= Journal Saint-François =

French-language weekly newspaper in Quebec, Canada

- Format: Tabloid
- Owner: Gravité Média
- Founded: 1977
- Language: French
- Sister newspapers: Le Courrier du Sud, La Relève, Le Reflet, Le Soleil de Châteauguay
- Website: www.journalsaint-francois.ca

Le Journal Saint-François is a free French-language weekly tabloid newspaper based in Salaberry-de-Valleyfield, Quebec, Canada. The newspaper is distributed online and at 125 drop-off points in the city of Salaberry-de-Valleyfield and other municipalities that are part of the Beauharnois-Salaberry Regional County Municipality and the Vaudreuil-Soulanges Regional County Municipality. Le Journal Saint-François is owned by Gravité Média.

In 2013, the newspaper merged with former competitor Le Soleil de Valleyfield when media group Quebecor sold its regional weekly papers to Transcontinental. Two years later, Le Soleil was absorbed into Le Journal Saint-François. In the years preceding the merger, other newspapers in the region closed, making Le Journal Saint-François one of only two print newspaper covering the city of Salaberry-de-Valleyfield. News website INFOSuroit.com also covers the area.

Le Journal Saint-François covers local news, including politics, urban development, culture, crime, and other topics.

Gravité Média also owns Le Journal Saint-François' sister publications, Le Courrier du Sud, La Relève, Le Reflet and Le Soleil de Châteauguay.
