= Quebec Route 201 =

Highway in Quebec

Coordinates: 45.3828°N 74.2445°W

Route 201

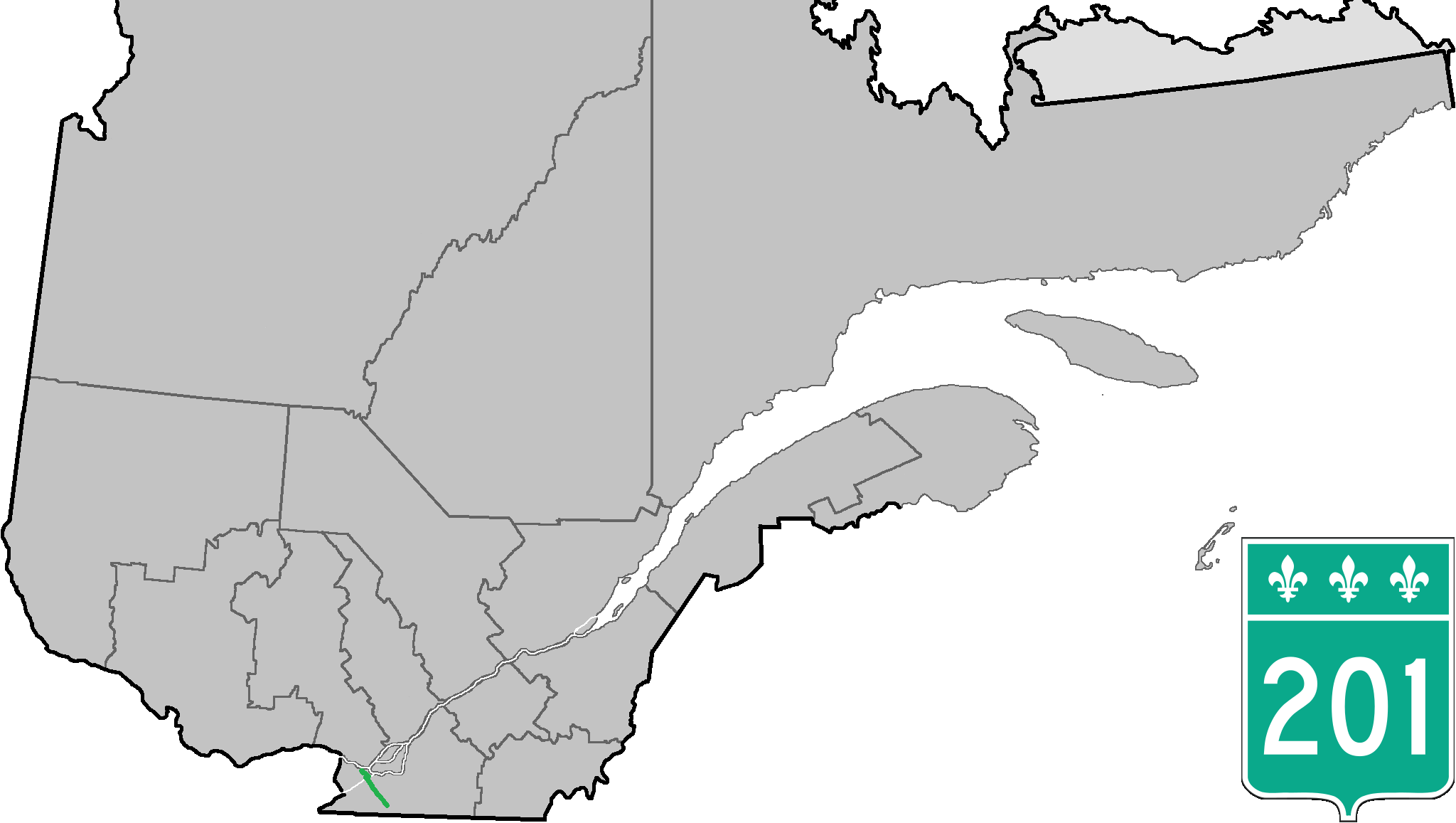

Route information
- Maintained by Transports Québec
- Length: 69.8 km (43.4 mi)

Major junctions
- South end: R-202 in Franklin
- R-209 in Franklin; R-138 in Ormstown; R-236 in Saint-Stanislas-de-Kostka; A-530 / R-132 in Salaberry-de-Valleyfield; A-20 / R-338 in Coteau-du-Lac; R-340 in Saint-Clet; A-40 (TCH) in Rigaud
- North end: R-342 in Rigaud

Location
- Country: Canada
- Province: Quebec

Highway system
- Quebec provincial highways; Autoroutes; List; Former
← R-199	→ R-202

Route 201 is a north/south provincial highway within the Canadian province of Quebec, running between Route 202 in Franklin (near the Canada–US border) and Route 342 in Rigaud. Its total length is approximately 70 kilometres.

Route 201 links Salaberry-de-Valleyfield with Autoroute 20 using the Monseigneur Langlois Bridge to cross the Saint Lawrence River. It is among the five primary or secondary highways to cross the river, the others being the 138, the 112, the 134, and the 175. It is also the only 200 series highway to be partly north of the river.

== Municipalities along Route 201 ==
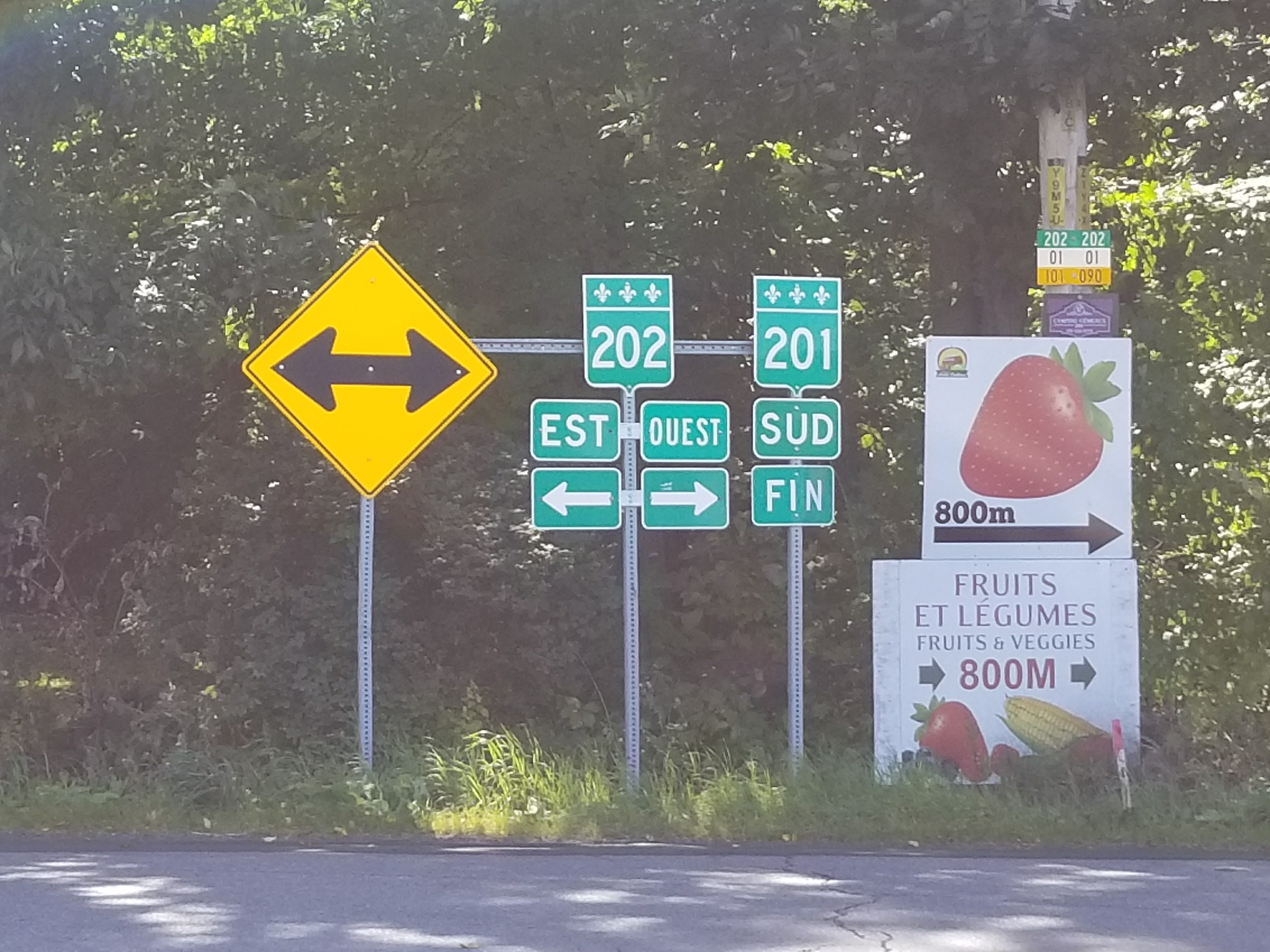
South end of Quebec Route 201

- Franklin
- Ormstown
- Saint-Stanislas-de-Kostka
- Salaberry-de-Valleyfield
- Coteau-du-Lac
- Saint-Clet
- Saint-Lazare
- Sainte-Marthe
- Rigaud
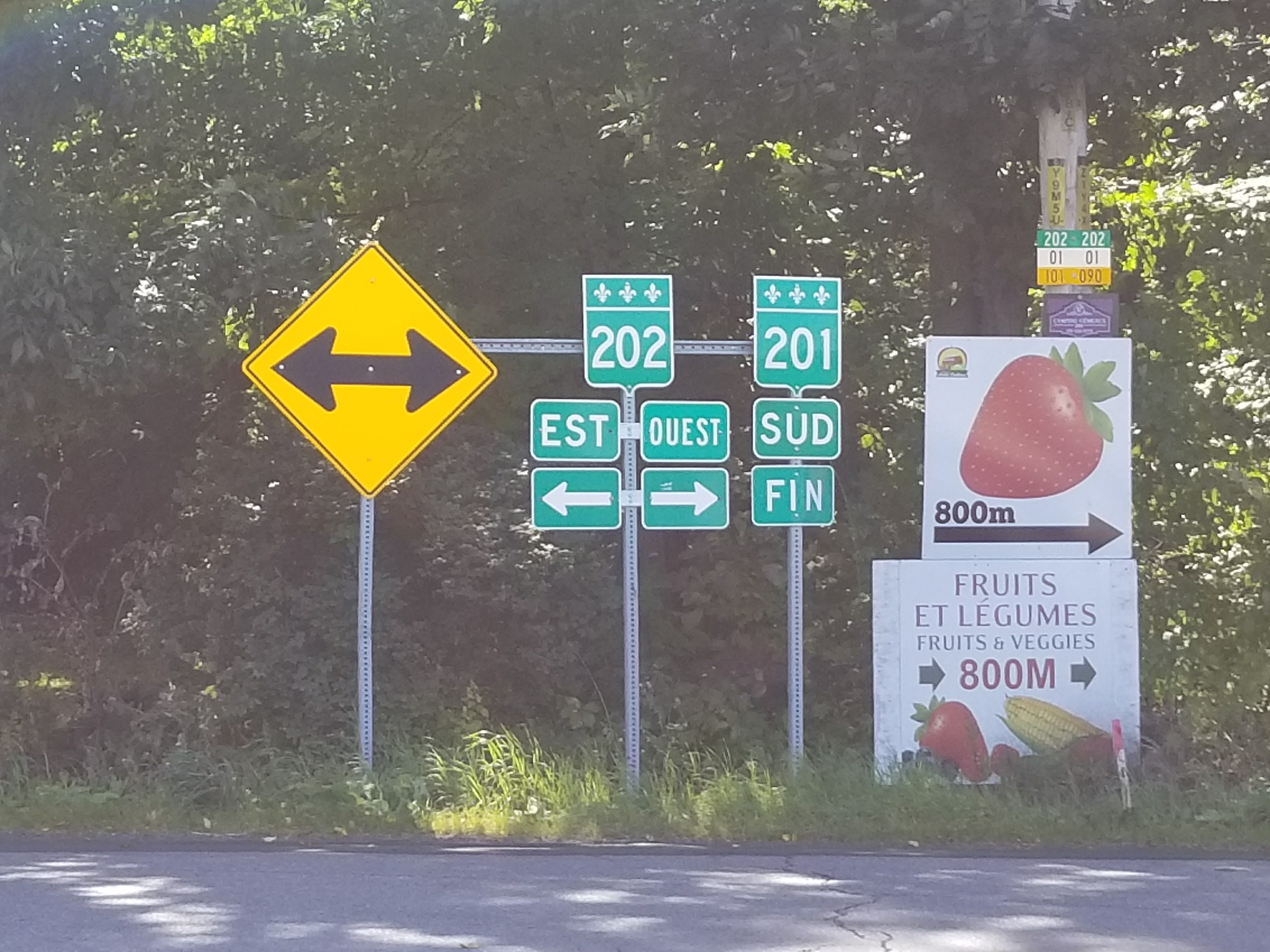
Southern end at route 202.

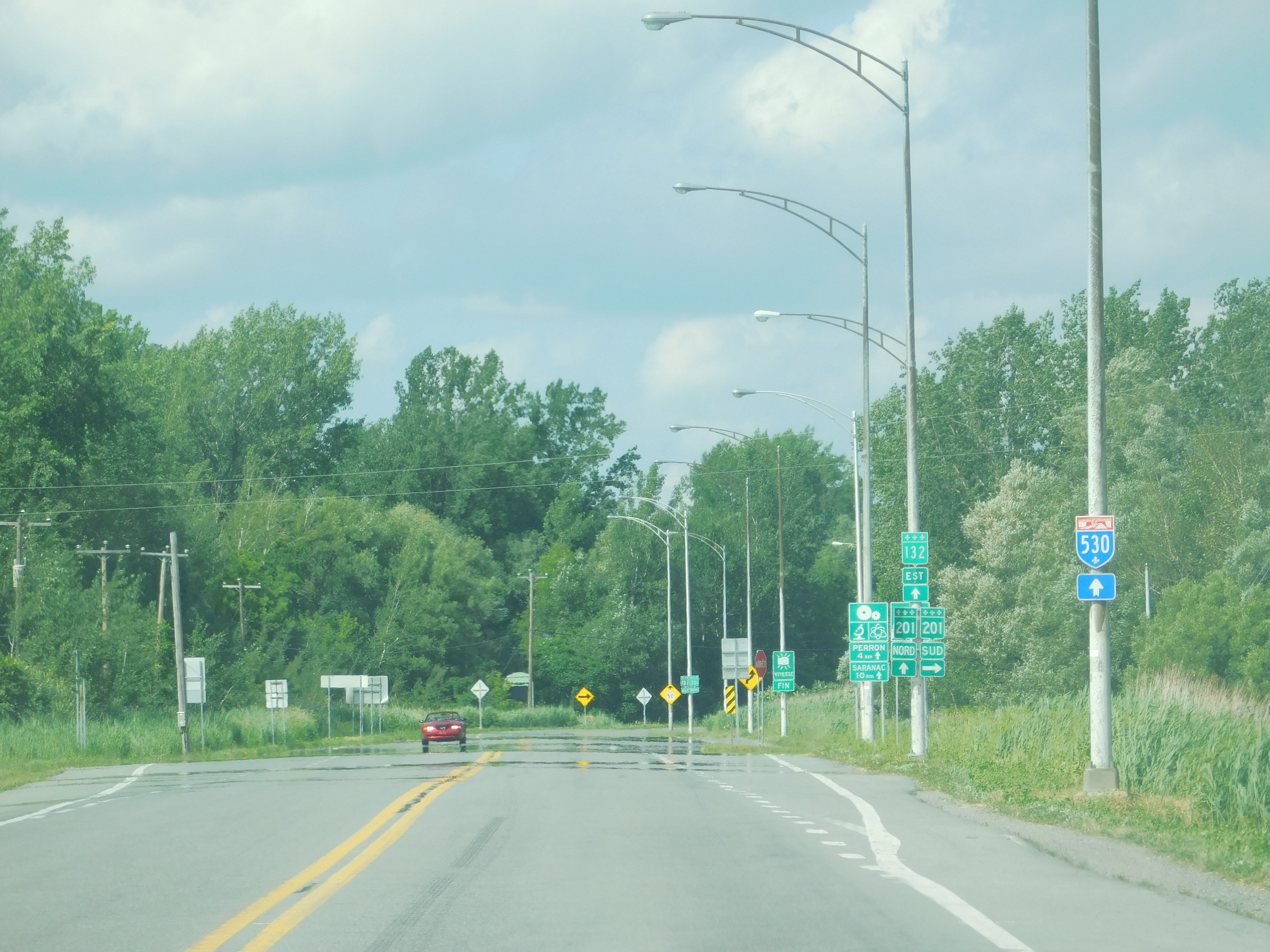
Intersection with Route 132 in Saint-Stanislas.

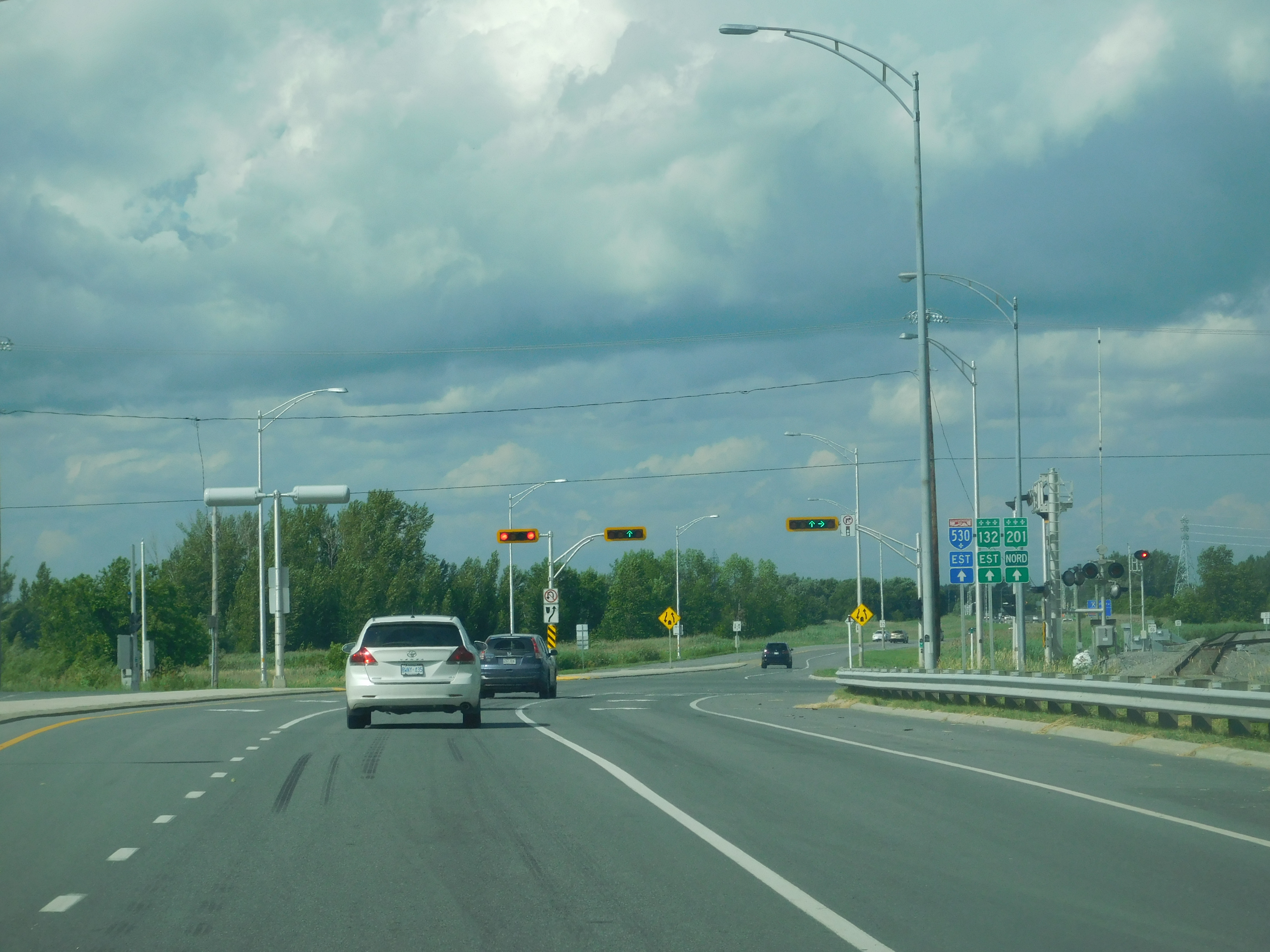
Route 201 is concurrent with Route 132 and Autoroute 530.

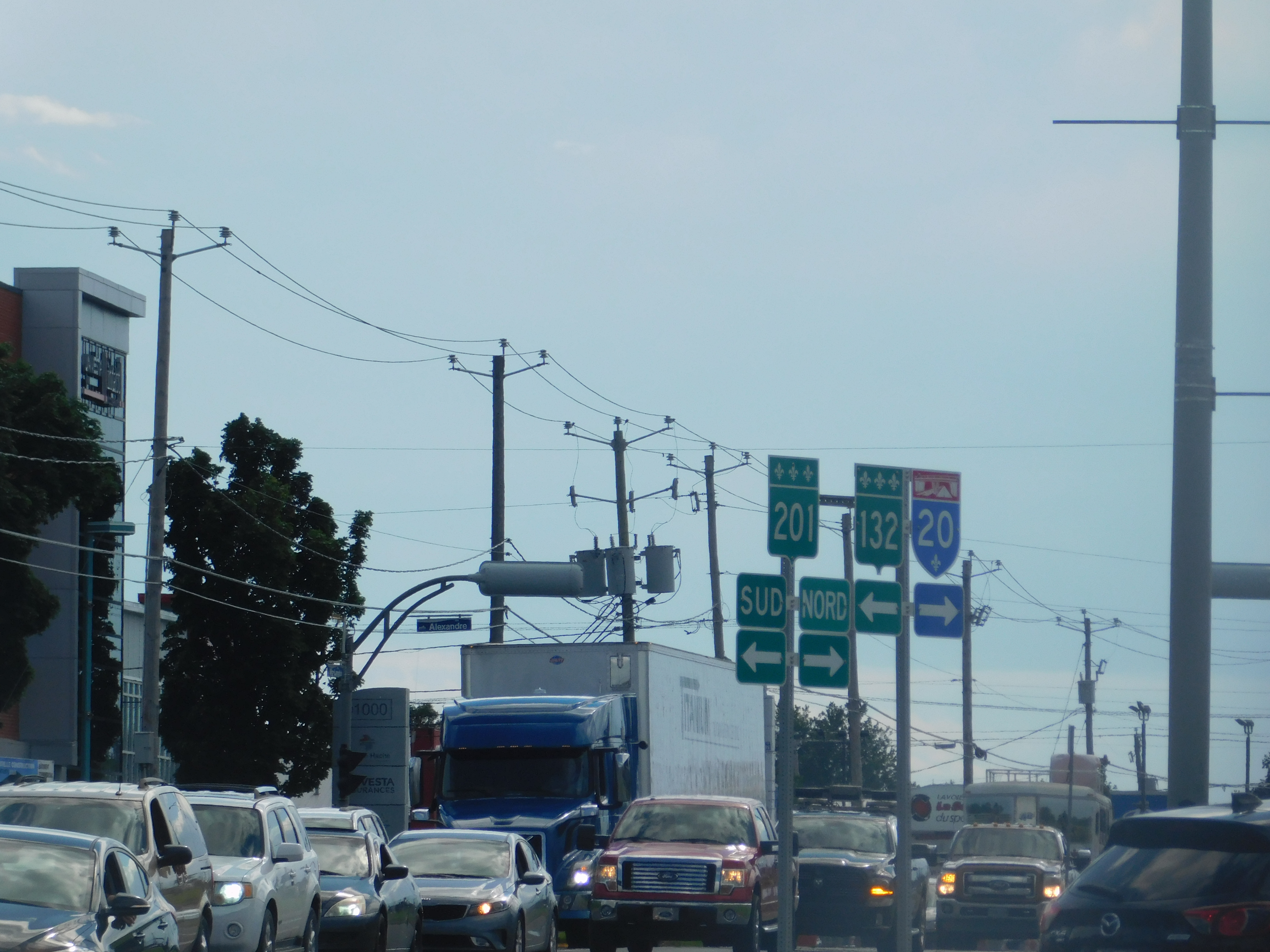
Route 201 in Valleyfield.

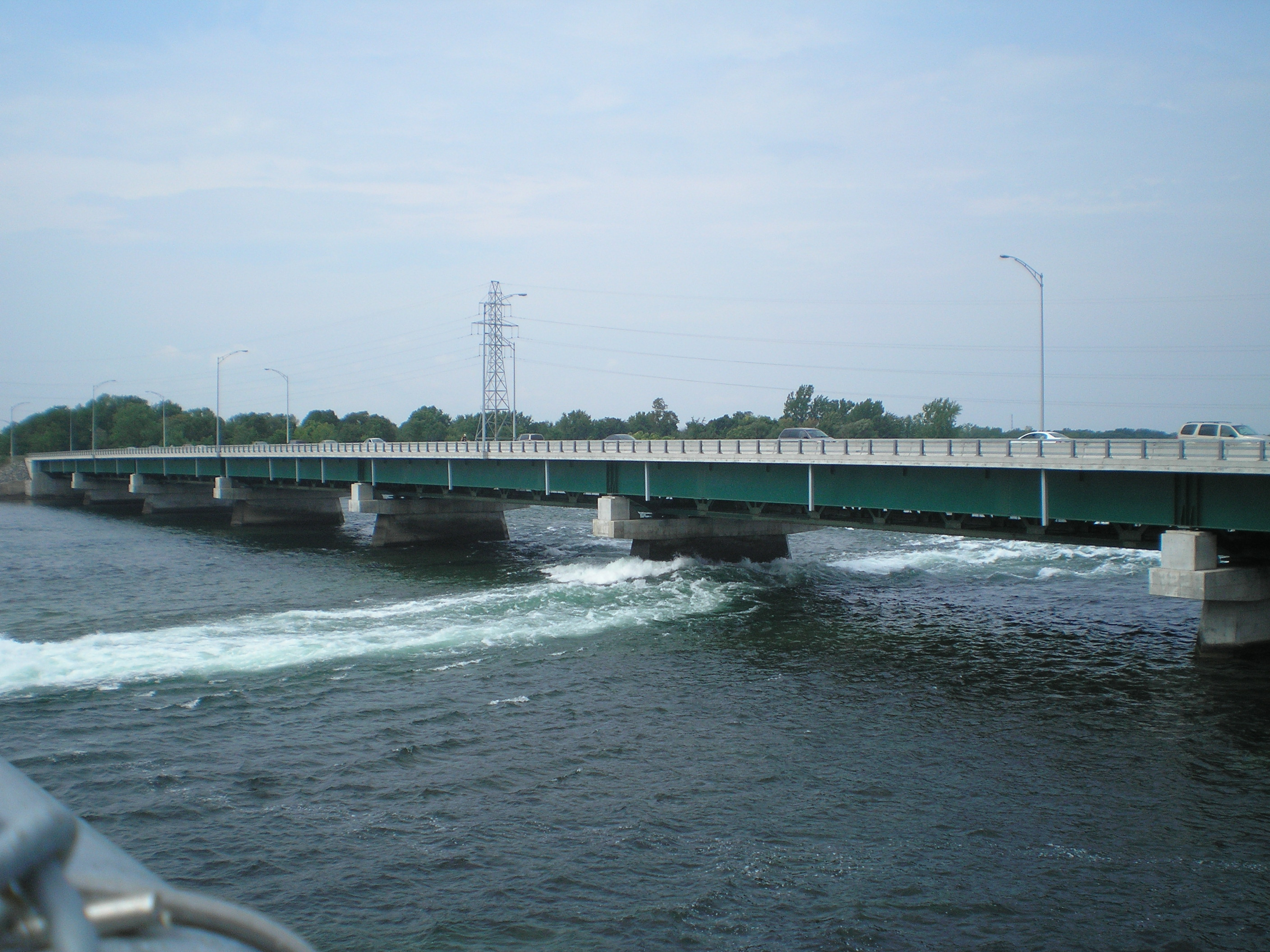
Monseigneur-Langlois Bridge between Valleyfield and Coteau-du-Lac.

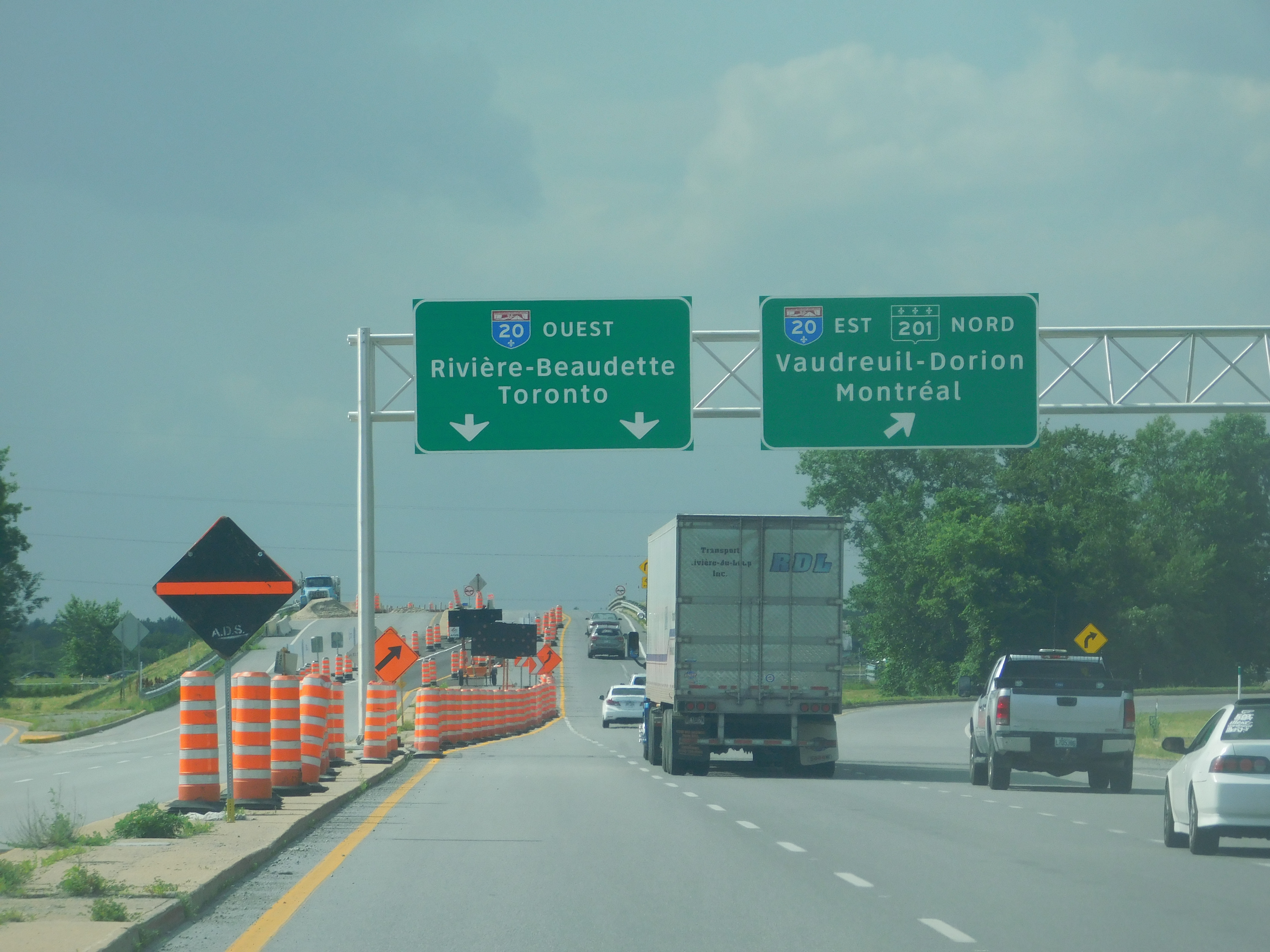
Interchange with Autoroute 20.

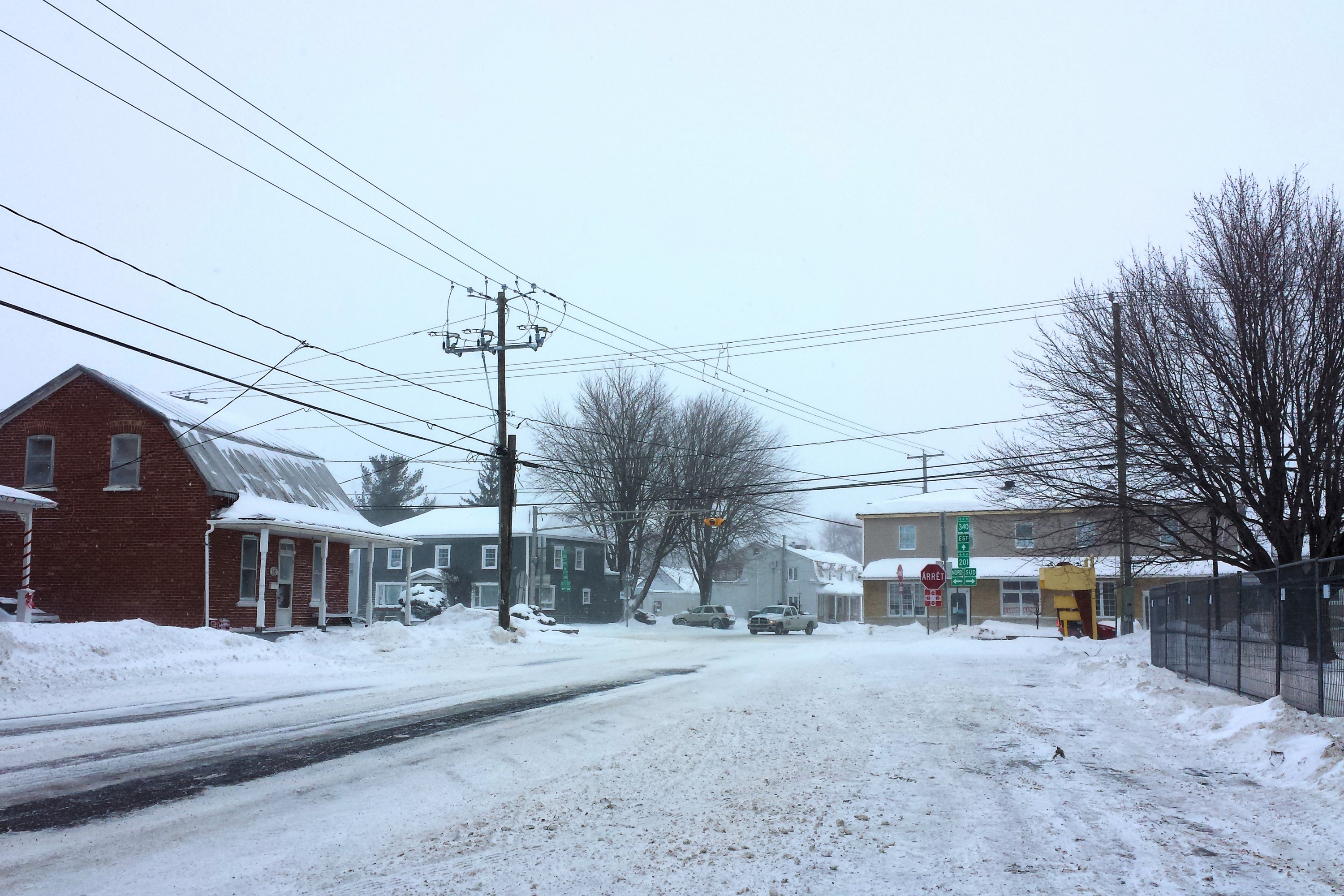
Junction of 340 and 201 in Saint-Clet.

== Major intersections ==
RCM	Location	km	mi	Destinations	Notes
Le Haut-Saint-Laurent	Franklin	0.0	0.0	R-202 – Hemmingford, Huntingdon	R-201 southern terminus
Le Haut-Saint-Laurent	Franklin	2.4	1.5	R-209 – Franklin, Saint-Chrysostome	
Le Haut-Saint-Laurent	Saint-Chrysostome	13.6	8.5	R-138 east – Montréal	South end of R-138 concurrency
Le Haut-Saint-Laurent	Saint-Chrysostome	14.8	9.2	R-138 west – Huntingdon	North end of R-138 concurrency
Beauharnois-Salaberry	Saint-Stanislas-de-Kostka – Saint-Louis-de-Gonzague boundary	23.8	14.8	R-236 – Saint-Stanislas-de-Kostka, Saint-Louis-de-Gonzague	
Beauharnois-Salaberry	Saint-Stanislas-de-Kostka	29.6	18.4	R-132 west – Sainte-Barbe, Huntingdon	South end of R-132 concurrency
Canal de Beauharnois		30.3– 31.3	18.8– 19.4	Pont Larocque (Larocque Bridge)	
Beauharnois-Salaberry	Salaberry-de-Valleyfield	31.6	19.6	A-530 begins / Chemin Larocque – Salaberry-de-Valleyfield (Centre-Ville)	At grade; A-530 western terminus; west end of A-530 concurrency
Beauharnois-Salaberry	Salaberry-de-Valleyfield	36.5	22.7	A-530 east to A-30 – Vaudreuil-Dorion, Sorel-Tracy	A-530 exit 5; east end of A-530 concurrency
Beauharnois-Salaberry	Salaberry-de-Valleyfield	37.5	23.3	Boulevard Hébert (R-132 east) – Salaberry-de-Valleyfield (Centre-Ville), Beauharnois	North end of R-132 concurrency
St. Lawrence River		43.3– 45.4	26.9– 28.2	Pont Monseigneur-Langlois (Monseigneur Langlois Bridge)	
Vaudreuil-Soulanges	Coteau-du-Lac	45.4	28.2	Chemin du Fleuve	Interchange; northbound exit and southbound entrance
Vaudreuil-Soulanges	Coteau-du-Lac	46.0	28.6	R-338 (Route de Lotbinière) – Les Coteaux, Coteau-du-Lac	Interchange
Vaudreuil-Soulanges	Coteau-du-Lac	46.9	29.1	A-20 west – Rivière-Beaudette, Toronto	Interchange; A-20 exit 14; south end of A-20 concurrency
Vaudreuil-Soulanges	Coteau-du-Lac	49.6	30.8	A-20 east – Montréal	Interchange; A-20 exit 17; north end of A-20 concurrency
Vaudreuil-Soulanges	Saint-Clet	56.7	35.2	R-340 – Saint-Polycarpe, Saint-Lazare	
Vaudreuil-Soulanges	Rigaud	69.4	43.1	A-40 (TCH) – Ottawa/Gatineau, Montréal	Interchange; A-40 exit 17
Vaudreuil-Soulanges	Rigaud	69.8	43.4	R-342 – Rigaud, Vaudreuil-Dorion	R-201 northern terminus
1.000 mi = 1.609 km; 1.000 km = 0.621 mi: Concurrency terminus; Incomplete access

== See also ==
- List of Quebec provincial highways
