= Quebec Autoroute 530 =

Highway in Quebec

Autoroute 530
- Autoroute 530
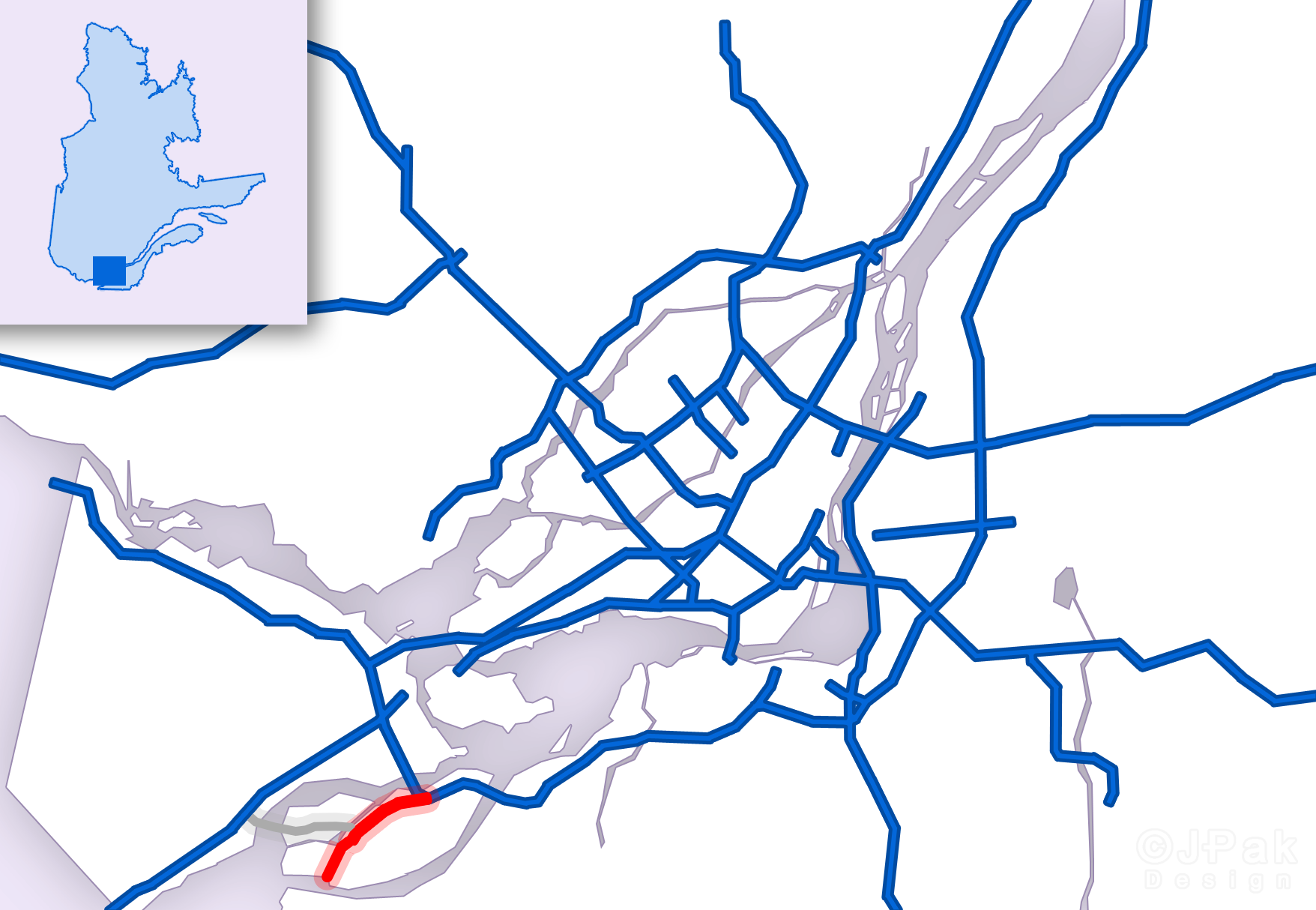

Route information
- Maintained by Transports Québec
- Length: 12.9 km (8.0 mi)
- Existed: 2012–present
- History: 1976 (opened as part of A-30)

Major junctions
- West end: R-132 / R-201 in Salaberry-de-Valleyfield
- East end: A-30 in Salaberry-de-Valleyfield

Location
- Country: Canada
- Province: Quebec
- Major cities: Salaberry-de-Valleyfield

Highway system
- Quebec provincial highways; Autoroutes; List; Former
← A-520	→ A-540

Autoroute 530 (A-530) is an autoroute located in Salaberry-de-Valleyfield, Montérégie, Quebec. The 12.9 km (8.0 mi) spur route links Autoroute 30 with Salaberry-de-Valleyfield and features two interchanges, one at Boulevard Pie XII and the other at Route 201.

Autoroute 530 was originally part of Autoroute 30, but was re-designated in 2012 when A-30 was realigned to cross the St. Lawrence River.

== Exit list ==
From west to east. The entire route is in Salaberry-de-Valleyfield, Beauharnois-Salaberry RCM.

km	mi	Exit	Destinations	Notes
0.0	0.0		R-132 west / R-201 south (Chemin Larocque) – Salaberry-de-Valleyfield, Ormstown, Huntingdon	Western terminus; traffic signals; west end of R-132 / R-201 concurrency
0.4	0.25		Boulevard Gérard-Cadieux	Traffic signals
1.6	0.99		Boulevard des Érables	Traffic signals
5.0	3.1	5	R-132 east / R-201 north (Boulevard Monseigneur-Langlois) – Coteau-du-Lac	East end of R-132 / R-201 concurrency
9.0	5.6	9	Boulevard Pie-XII – Saint-Louis-de-Gonzague	
12.9	8.0	12	A-30 – Vaudreuil-Dorion, Montreal, Sorel-Tracy, Quebec	Eastern terminus; A-30 exit 13
1.000 mi = 1.609 km; 1.000 km = 0.621 mi: Concurrency terminus

== Photo gallery ==
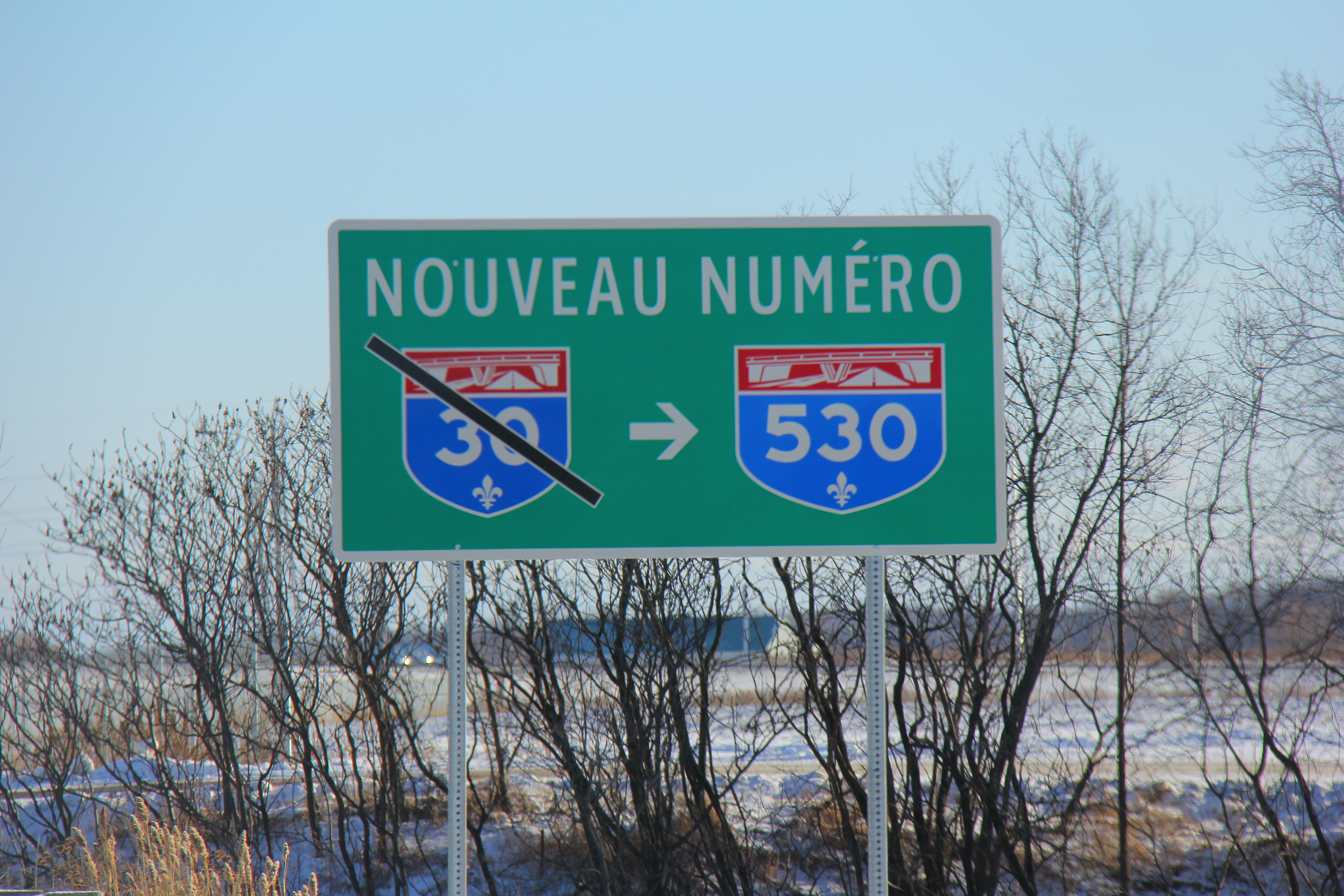

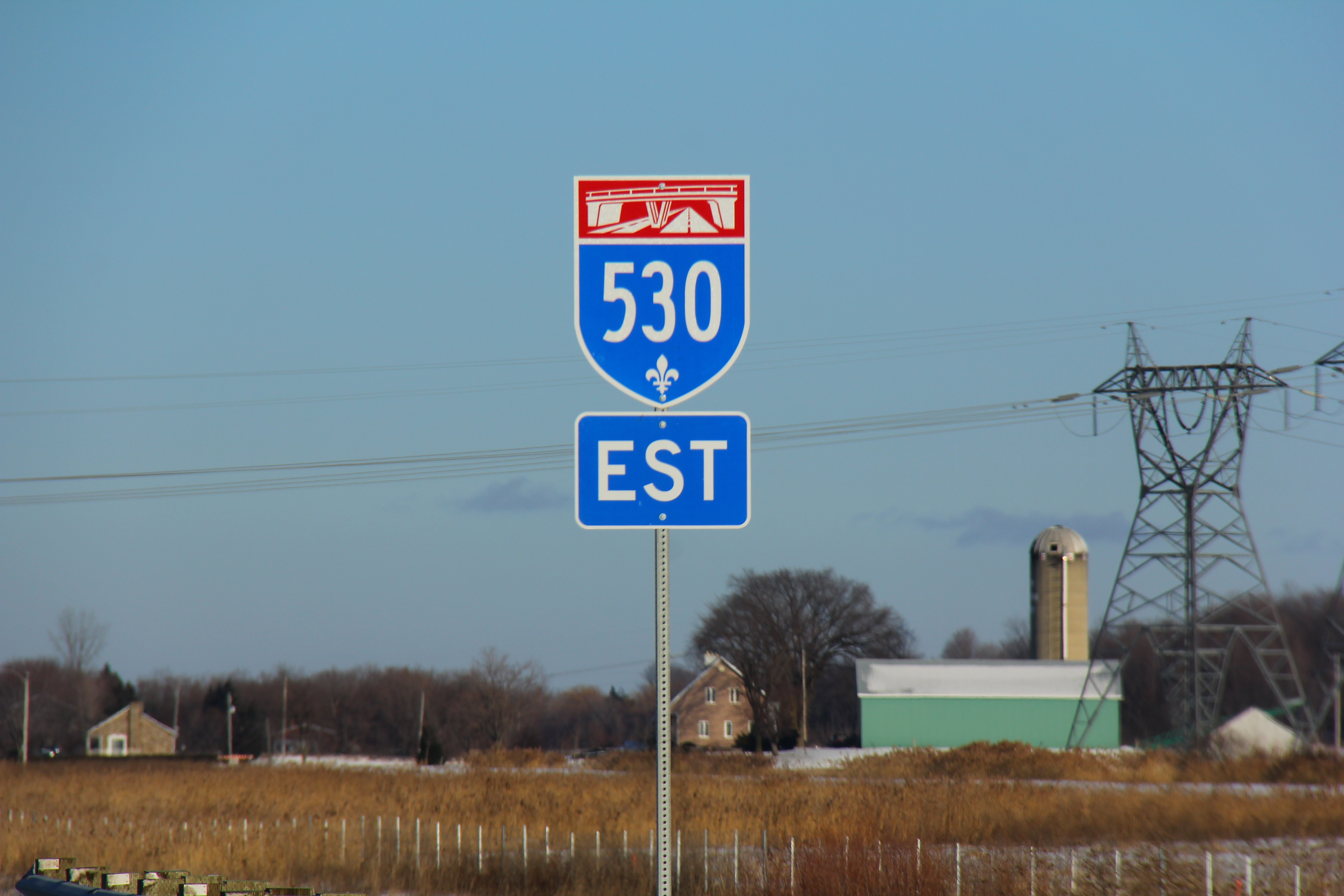

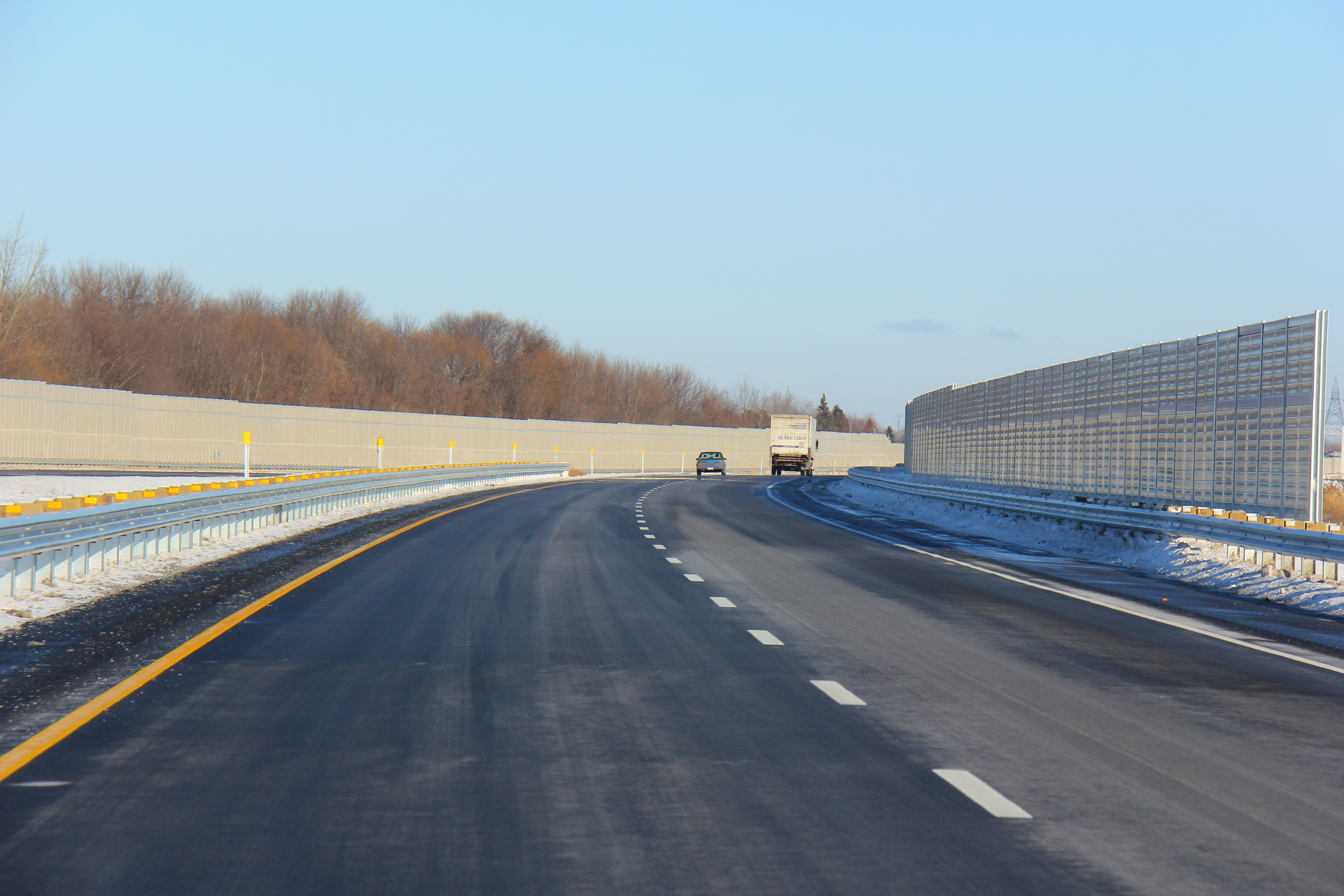

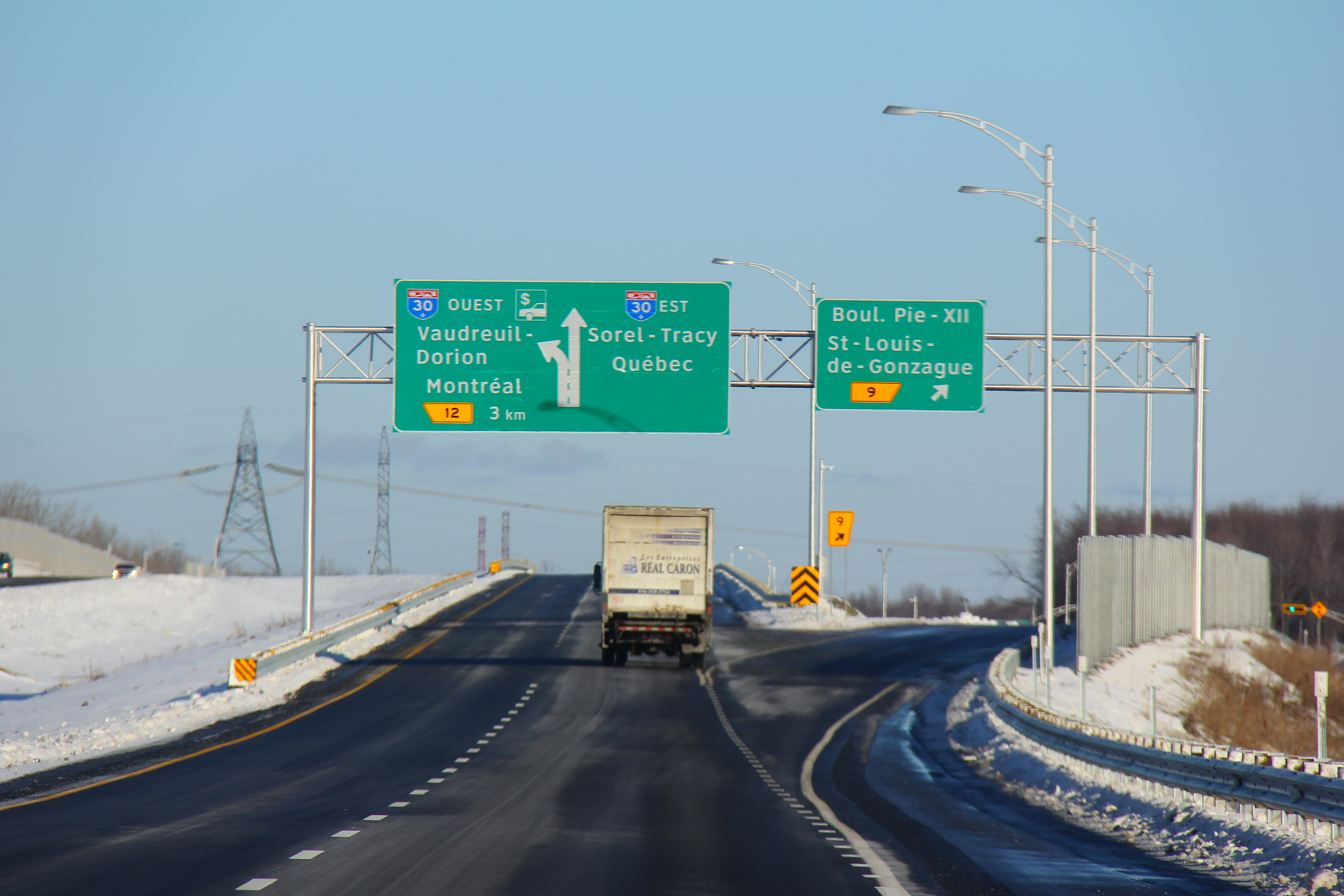

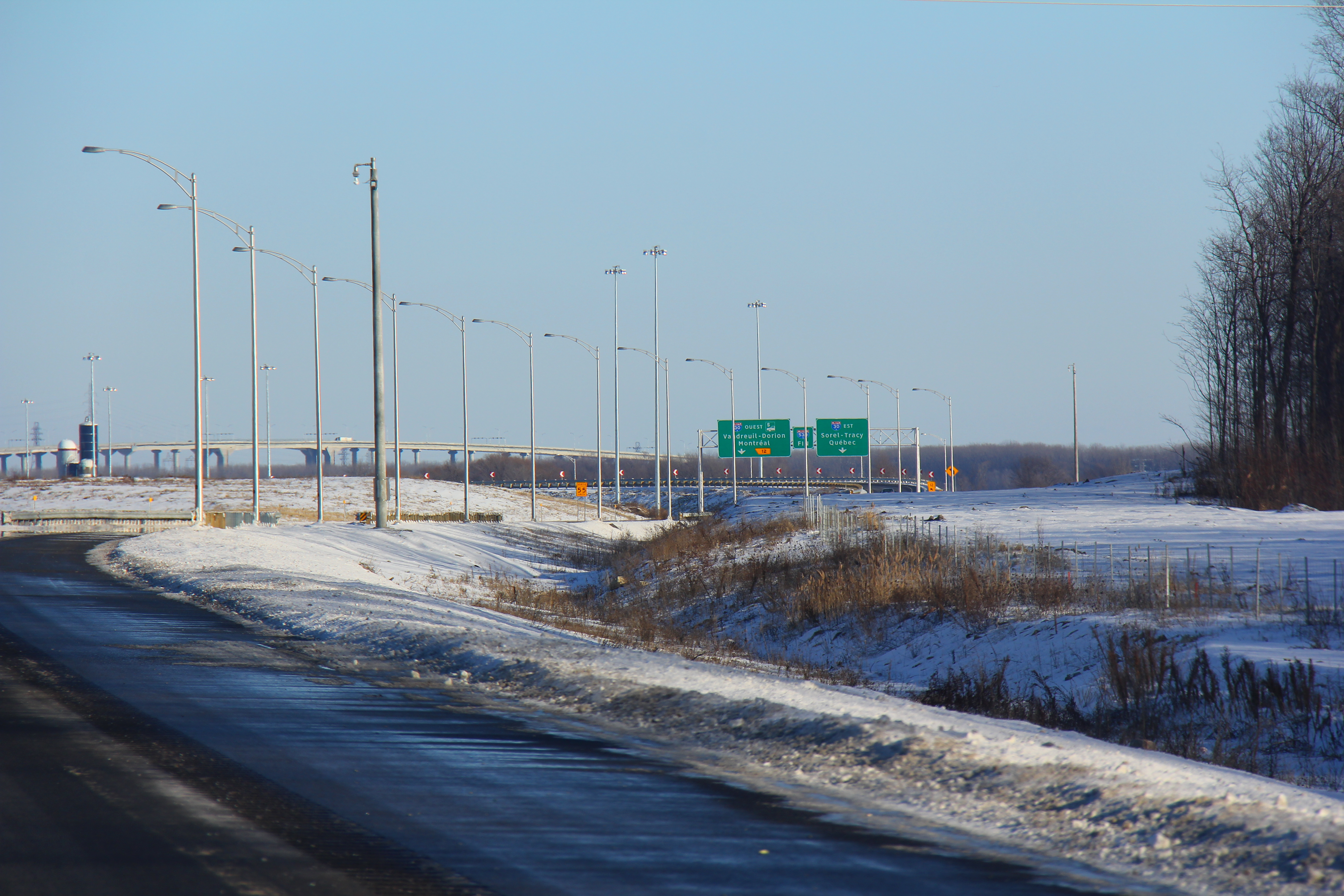

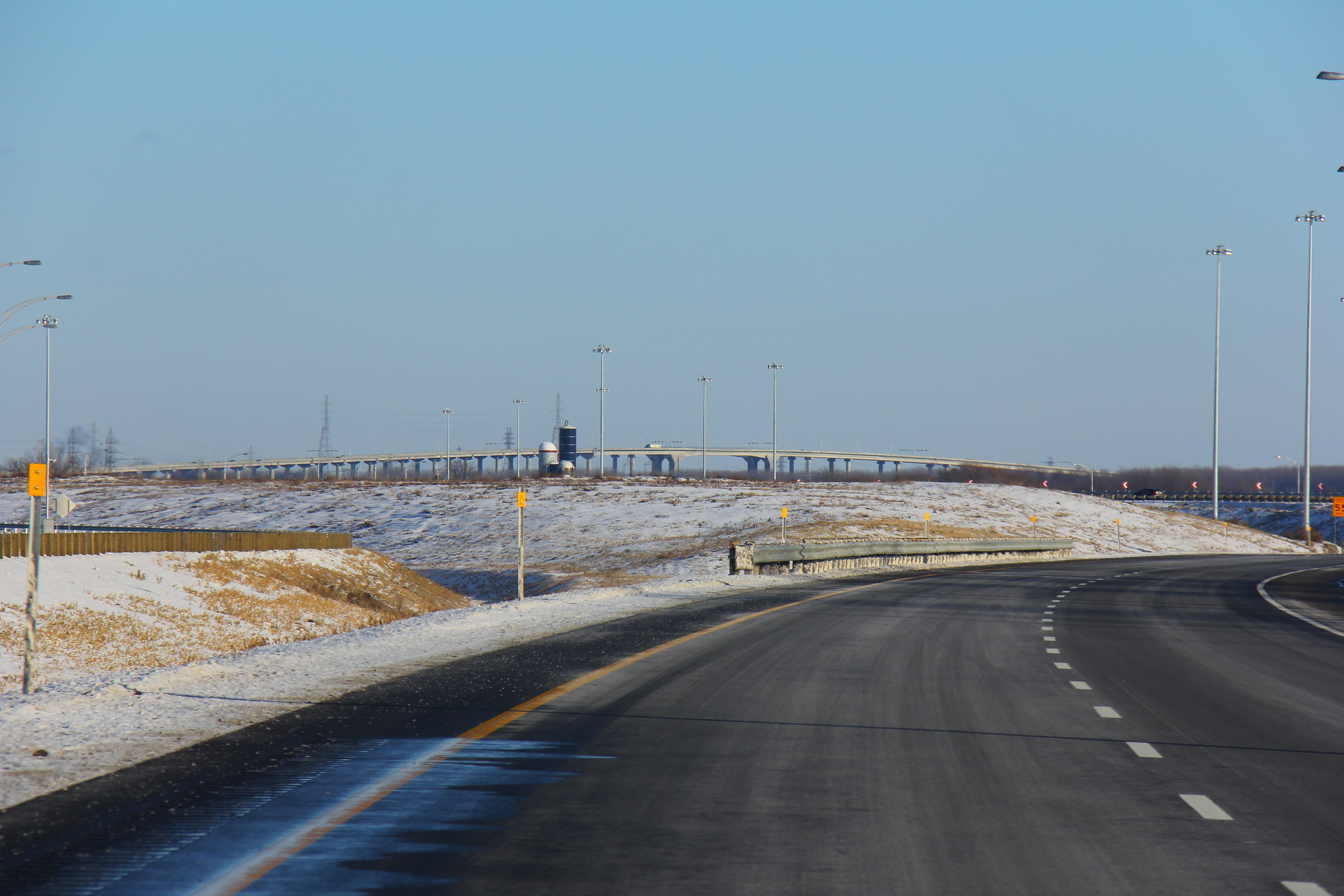

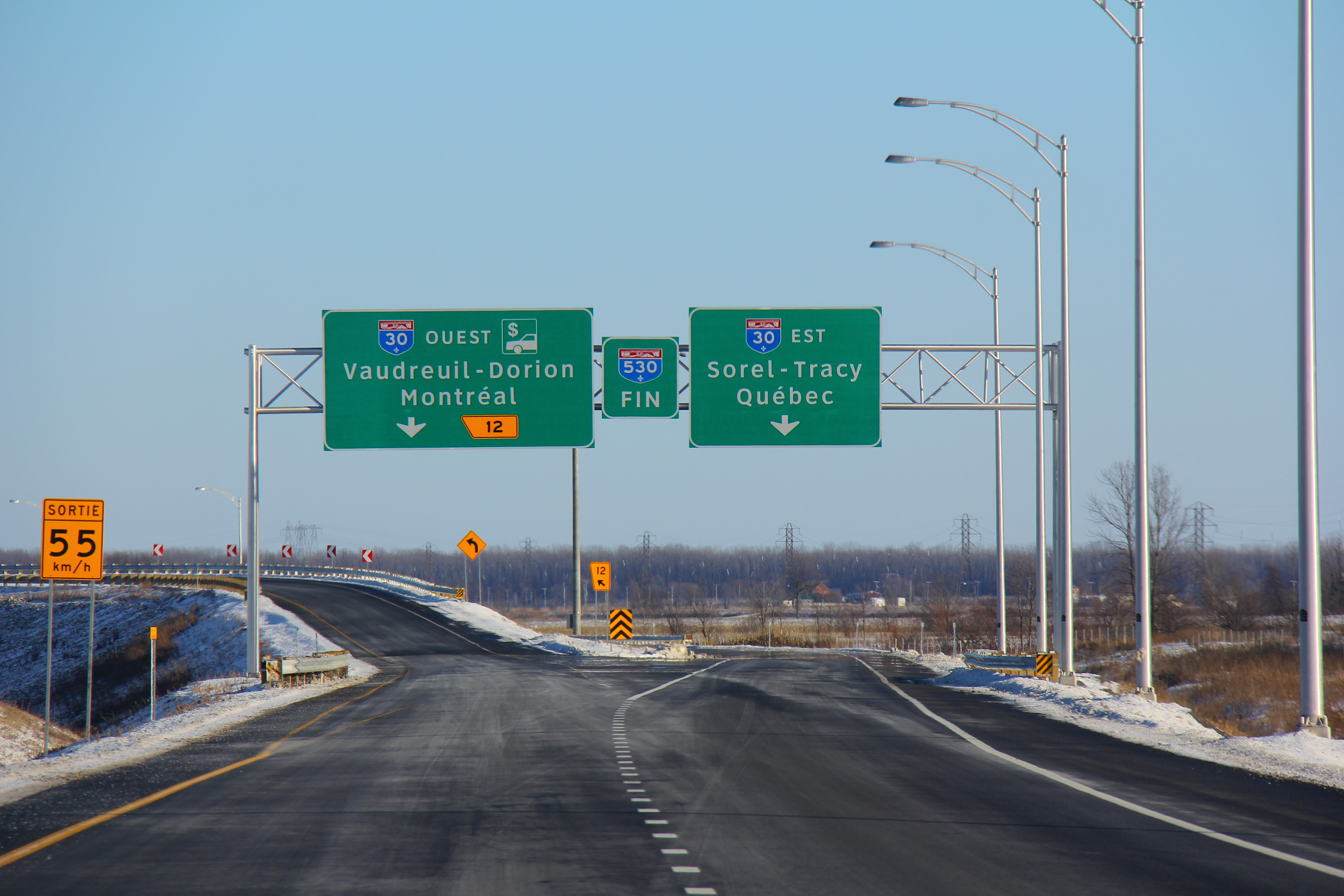
