= Côte-de-Liesse =

Côte-de-Liesse may refer to:

- Côte-de-Liesse station, a light metro and commuter rail station in Montreal, Quebec, Canada
- Autoroute Côte-de-Liesse, a highway in Montreal, Quebec, Canada
