= Maple Grove, Quebec =

Maple Grove, Quebec (Beauharnois)
- Former city
- Interactive map of Maple Grove, Quebec
- Coordinates: 45°19′26″N 73°50′24″W
- Country: Canada
- Province: Quebec
- Region: Montérégie
- RCM: Beauharnois-Salaberry
- Incorporated: 1918
- Merged: Jan 01, 2002

Government
  - Mayor: Daniel Charlebois
  - Federal: Beauharnois-Salaberry
  - Provincial: Beauharnois

Area
  - Land: 8.49 km^{2} (3.28 sq mi)

Population (2006)
  - Total: 2,808
  - Density: 330/km^{2} (850/sq mi)
  - Change *: +6.8%
  - Dwellings: 1,205
- Change from 2001 census
- Time zone: UTC−05:00 (EST)
- Area code: 450
- Access Routes: R-132
- + Merged with Beauharnois on Jan 01, 2002

Maple Grove is a district (secteur) of the city of Beauharnois, Quebec, which is located on the south shore of the St. Lawrence River in the Montérégie region.

== History ==
As part of the 2000–2006 municipal reorganization in Quebec, the city of Maple Grove and village of Melocheville were amalgamated into the city of Beauharnois on January 1, 2002.
