= Beauharnois Canal =

Watercourse in Quebec, Canada

Coordinates: 45°16′19.1″N 73°56′42.7″W

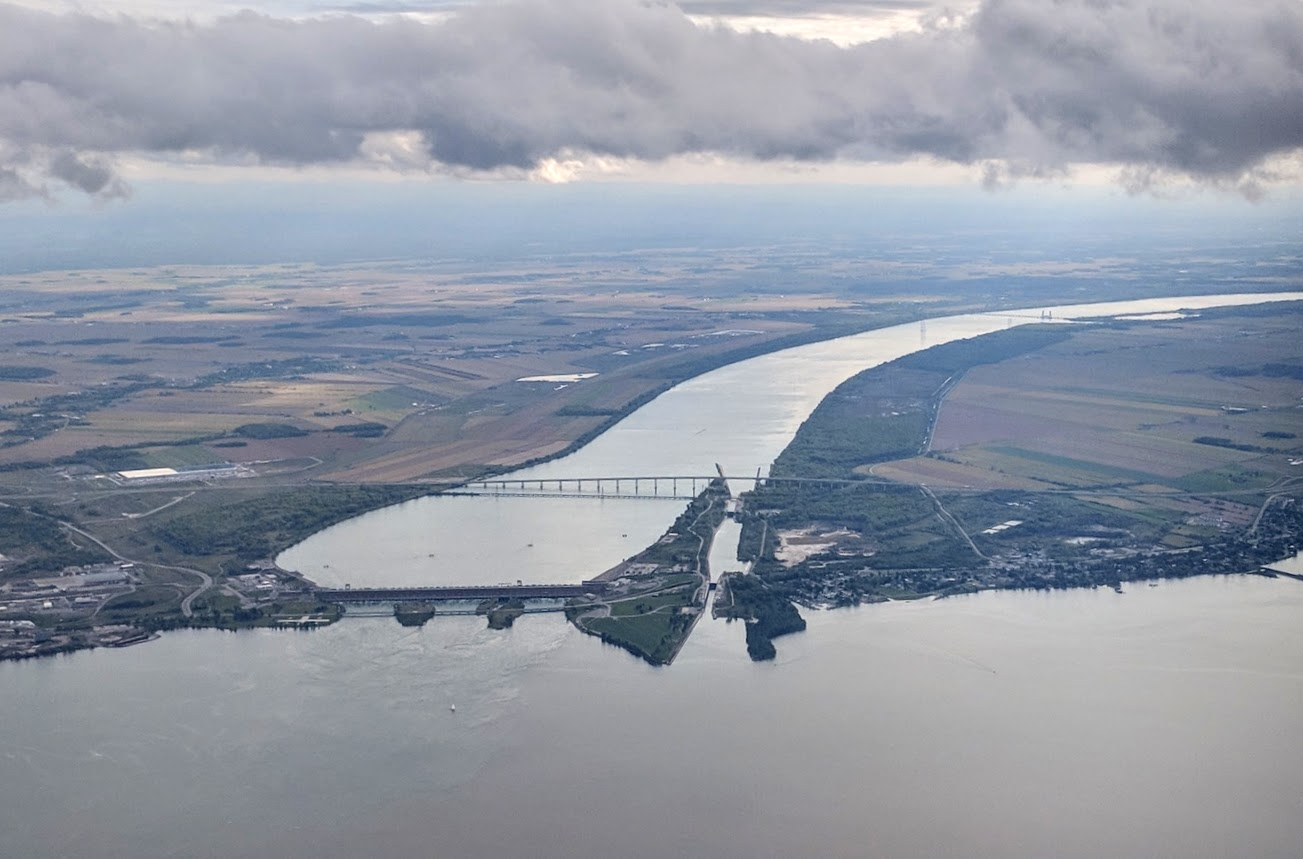
- Aerial view of the Beauharnois Canal
- Interactive map of Beauharnois Canal

Specifications
- Length: 20 km (12 miles)
- Locks: 2
- Maximum height AMSL: 45 m (148 ft)

History
- Construction began: 1929
- Date completed: 1932

The Beauharnois Canal (French: canal de Beauharnois, pronounced [kanal də boaʁnwa]) is located in southwestern Quebec, Canada. The canal is part of the Saint Lawrence Seaway.

Located in Beauharnois-Salaberry Regional County Municipality within the cities of Salaberry-de-Valleyfield, Beauharnois, Saint-Louis-de-Gonzague, and Saint-Stanislas-de-Kostka, the canal connects Lake Saint-Francis to the west (upstream) with Lake Saint-Louis to the northeast (downstream), bypassing a series of rapids on the Saint Lawrence River.

== History ==
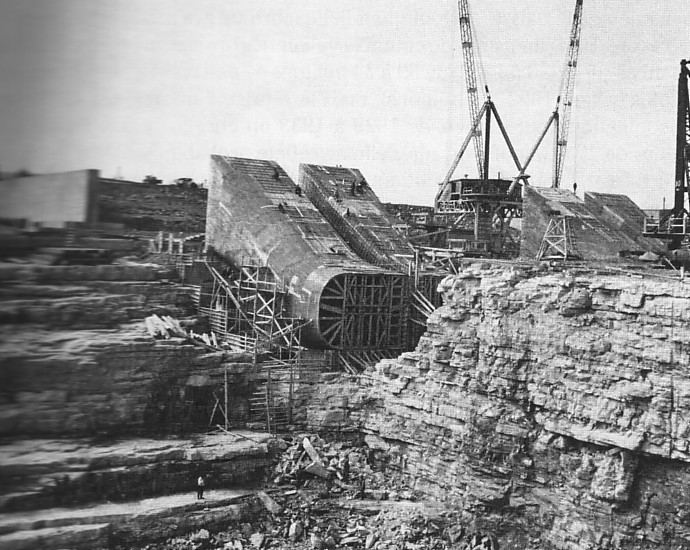
Construction on Beauharnois Canal in 1930

The original Beauharnois Canal opened in 1843, and measured 11 1/4 mi (18.1 km; 9.8 nmi) in length and was built on the south side of the St. Lawrence River. It replaced the Coteau-du-Lac canal.

The canal became obsolete and was superseded by the Soulanges Canal in 1899 which ran on the north side of the St. Lawrence River.

The present Beauharnois Canal was built between 1929-1932 on the south side of the St. Lawrence River, measuring 20 kilometres (12 mi) or 24.5 km (15.2 mi) in length, with a minimum depth of 8 metres (26 ft) and width of 182 metres (597 ft). This canal was built as part of a hydroelectric development at Beauharnois which saw a dam and power house built to take advantage of the 24 metres (79 ft) drop between Lake St. Francis and Lake St. Louis. Some of the electricity is used to power a large aluminum smelter in Beauharnois.

In the 1950s, the Beauharnois Canal had 2 locks added as part of the Saint Lawrence Seaway project, which were inaugurated in 1959. This in turn superseded the Soulanges Canal. The locks enable ships up to 27,000 tons to travel between the two lakes.

== Bridges ==
Bridges over the canal in downstream order are:

- Larocque Bridge - carrying Routes 132 and 201, and the railway tracks of CSX Transportation, connecting Salaberry-de-Valleyfield with Saint-Stanislas-de-Kostka
- St. Louis Bridge - connecting Salaberry-de-Valleyfield with Saint-Louis-de-Gonzague
- Madeleine Parent Bridge - carrying Autoroute 30
- Pied-du-Canal or CSX Bridge - railroad bridge
- Boulevard Edgar Hébert Bridge - carrying Route 132 between Melocheville and Beauharnois (this crossing consists of a suspension bridge over the discharge of the Beauharnois Power Station and a tunnel under the locks of Beauharnois Canal)
