= Saint-Urbain-Premier =

- Municipality
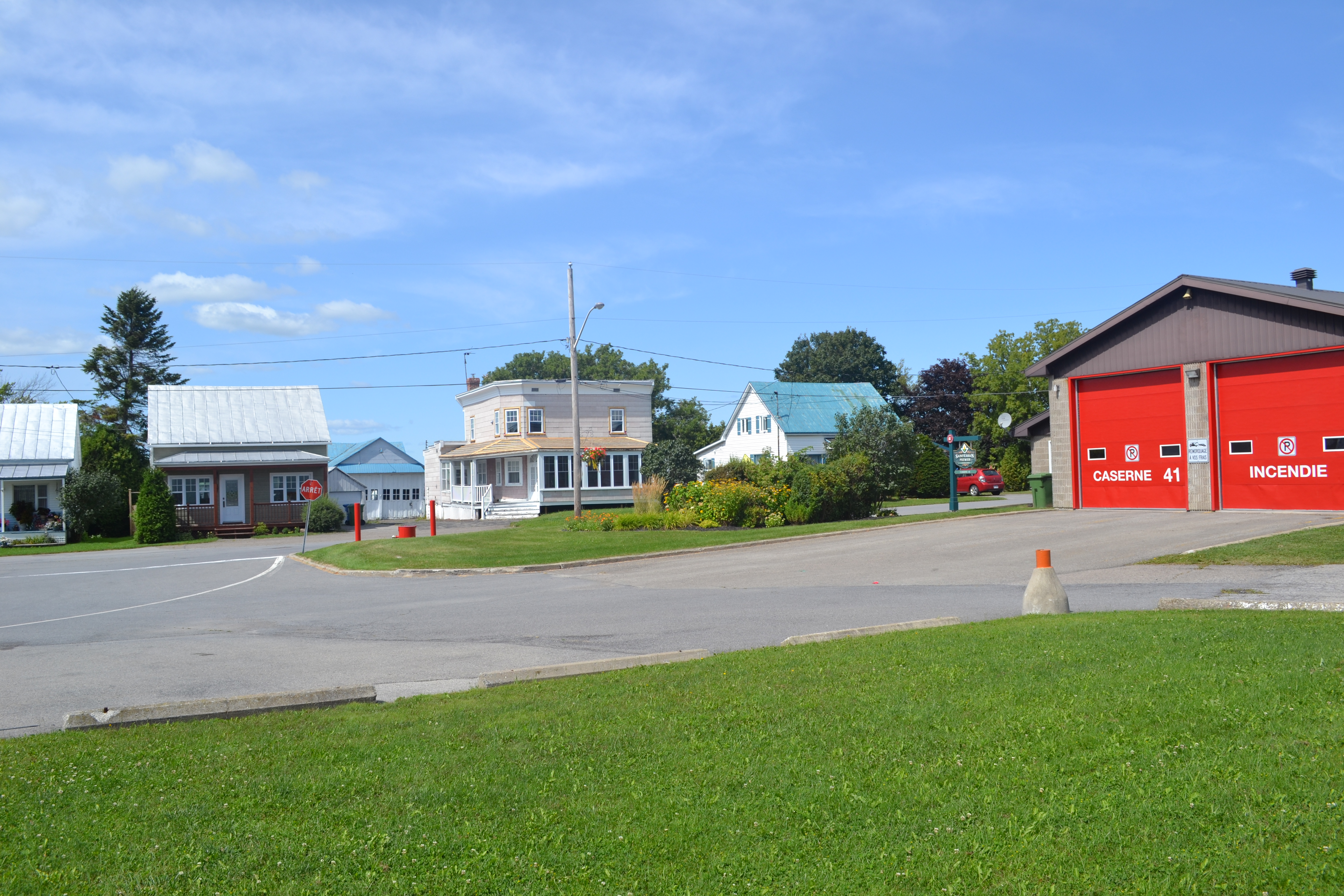

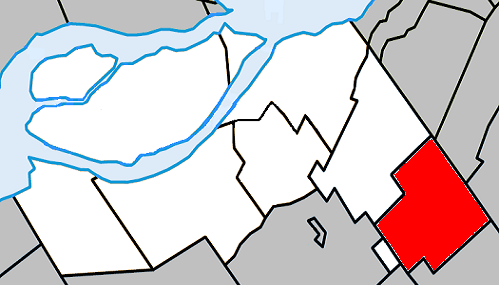
- Location within Beauharnois-Salaberry RCM

- Location in southern Quebec
- Coordinates: 45.22°N 73.73°W
- Country: Canada
- Province: Quebec
- Region: Montérégie
- RCM: Beauharnois-Salaberry
- Constituted: July 1, 1855

Government
  - Mayor: Lucien Thibault
  - Federal riding: Châteauguay—Lacolle
  - Prov. riding: Huntingdon

Area
  - Total: 53.54 km^{2} (20.67 sq mi)
  - Land: 53.28 km^{2} (20.57 sq mi)

Population (2021)
  - Total: 1,332
  - Density: 25/km^{2} (65/sq mi)
  - Pop (2016-21): ▲5.4%
  - Dwellings: 538
- Time zone: UTC−5 (EST)
  - Summer (DST): UTC−4 (EDT)
- Postal code(s): J0S 1Y0
- Area codes: 450 and 579
- Highways: R-205 R-207
- Website: www.saint-urbain-premier.com

Saint-Urbain-Premier (French pronunciation: [sɛ̃t‿yʁbɛ̃ pʁəmje]) is a municipality located southwest of Montreal in Beauharnois-Salaberry, in the Montérégie region of Quebec, Canada. The population as of the 2021 Canadian census was 1,332.

== History ==
Settlement of the area started at the beginning of the 19th century. In 1804, the first lots were granted. In 1821, the area was officially surveyed and settlers began arriving in larger numbers.

In 1848, the parish of St. Urbain Premier was formed, named after Pope Urban I, who reigned from 222 to 230AD. In 1853, its post office opened, and two years later, the Parish Municipality of Saint-Urbain-Premier was founded. In 1876, the post office was renamed to Saint-Urbain-de-Châteauguay, in order to distinguish it from Saint-Urbain in the Charlevoix region.

In 1997, the parish municipality changed statutes to became a regular municipality.

== Demographics ==
=== Population ===
Canada census – Saint-Urbain-Premier community profile

	2021	2016	2011
Population	1,332 (+5.4% from 2016)	1,264 (+10.1% from 2011)	1,148 (+1.7% from 2006)
Land area	53.28 km^{2} (20.57 sq mi)	53.29 km^{2} (20.58 sq mi)	53.03 km^{2} (20.47 sq mi)
Population density	25.0/km^{2} (65/sq mi)	23.7/km^{2} (61/sq mi)	21.6/km^{2} (56/sq mi)
Median age	38.8 (M: 39.2, F: 38.8)	39.9 (M: 39.4, F: 40.2)	42.6 (M: 42.2, F: 42.9)
Private dwellings	538 (total) 504 (occupied)	530 (total)	462 (total)
Median household income	$87,000	$68,907	$72,018

References: 2021 2016 2011

Historical Census Data - Saint-Urbain-Premier, Quebec

Year	Pop.	±%
1921	1,014	—
1931	879	−13.3%
1941	924	+5.1%
1951	929	+0.5%
1956	982	+5.7%
1961	1,078	+9.8%

Year	Pop.	±%
1966	1,113	+3.2%
1971	1,112	−0.1%
1976	1,120	+0.7%
1981	1,160	+3.6%
1986	1,151	−0.8%
1991	1,145	−0.5%

Year	Pop.	±%
1996	1,179	+3.0%
2001	1,144	−3.0%
2006	1,129	−1.3%
2011	1,148	+1.7%
2016	1,264	+10.1%
2021	1,332	+5.4%

Source: Statistics Canada

=== Language ===
Canada Census Mother Tongue - Saint-Urbain-Premier, Quebec
Census	Total	French			English			French & English			Other		
Year	Responses	Count	Trend	Pop %	Count	Trend	Pop %	Count	Trend	Pop %	Count	Trend	Pop %
2016	1,265	1,195	▲13.8%	94.5%	55	▼21.4%	4.3%	10	▼33.3%	0.8%	10	▼33.3%	0.8%
2011	1,150	1,050	▲5.0%	91.30%	70	▼22.2%	6.09%	15	▼25.0%	1.30%	15	0.0%	1.30%
2006	1,125	1,000	▼4.3%	88.89%	90	▲12.5%	8.00%	20	▲ n/a%	1.78%	15	▼25.0%	1.33%
2001	1,145	1,045	▼8.7%	91.27%	80	▲166.7%	6.99%	0	0.0%	0.00%	20	▲ n/a%	1.74%
1996	1,175	1,145	n/a	97.45%	30	n/a	2.55%	0	n/a	0.00%	0	n/a	0.00%

== Local government ==
List of former mayors:

- Joseph Noel Doré (1855–1860)
- Norman Finlayson (1860–1862)
- Joseph Dumont (1862–1864, 1870–1874)
- Antoine Hébert (1864–1868, 1874–1878, 1884–1886)
- Joseph Abraham Defayette (1868–1870)
- Antoine Bouthilier (1878–1880)
- Louis Césaire Sainte Marie (1880–1882)
- Louis Emery Grégoire (1882–1884, 1890–1896)
- Chrystophe Legault (1886–1890)
- Isaïe Polydore Bourdeau (1896–1900)
- Joseph Patenaude (1900–1906)
- Gilbert Mallette (1906–1907)
- Francois Urgel Goyette (1907–1913)
- Victor Ernest Ste Marie (1913–1916)
- Charles Dieudonné Emmanuël Dupras (1916–1917)
- Napoleon Doré (1917–1919)
- Joseph Artias Jodoin (1919–1921)
- Joseph Arthur Lazure (1921–1923)
- Armand Beaulieu (1923–1925)
- Joseph Adrien Ste Marie (1925–1927, 1930–1931)
- Antonio Mallette (1927–1930)
- Joseph Jean Baptiste Elzear Jodoin (1931–1933)
- Joseph Philorum Delphis Doray (1933–1937)
- Raoul Vinet (1937–1942)
- Zotique Beaulieu (1942–1945)
- Edgar Viau (1945–1949)
- Ovila Yelle (1949–1951)
- René Vincent (1951–1953)
- Roméo Gervais (1953–1955)
- Joseph, Arsène Omer Lazure (1955–1962)
- Floriant Victor Lazure (1962–1965)
- Fernand Byette (1965–1969)
- Fridolin Beaulieu (1969–1975)
- Joseph Louis Philippe Valmore Sénécal (1975–1977)
- Armand Miller (1977–1984)
- Jean Guy Brais (1984–1986)
- Jean Marie Lapointe (1986–1989)
- Réjean Beaulieu (1989–1997, 2004–2013, 2017–2021)
- Jean Pierre McKenzie (1997–2004)
- Francine Daigle (2013–2017)
- Alain Brault (2021–2022)
- Lucien Thibault (2022–present)

== See also ==
- Châteauguay River
- List of municipalities in Quebec
