= Saint-Stanislas-de-Kostka =

- Municipality
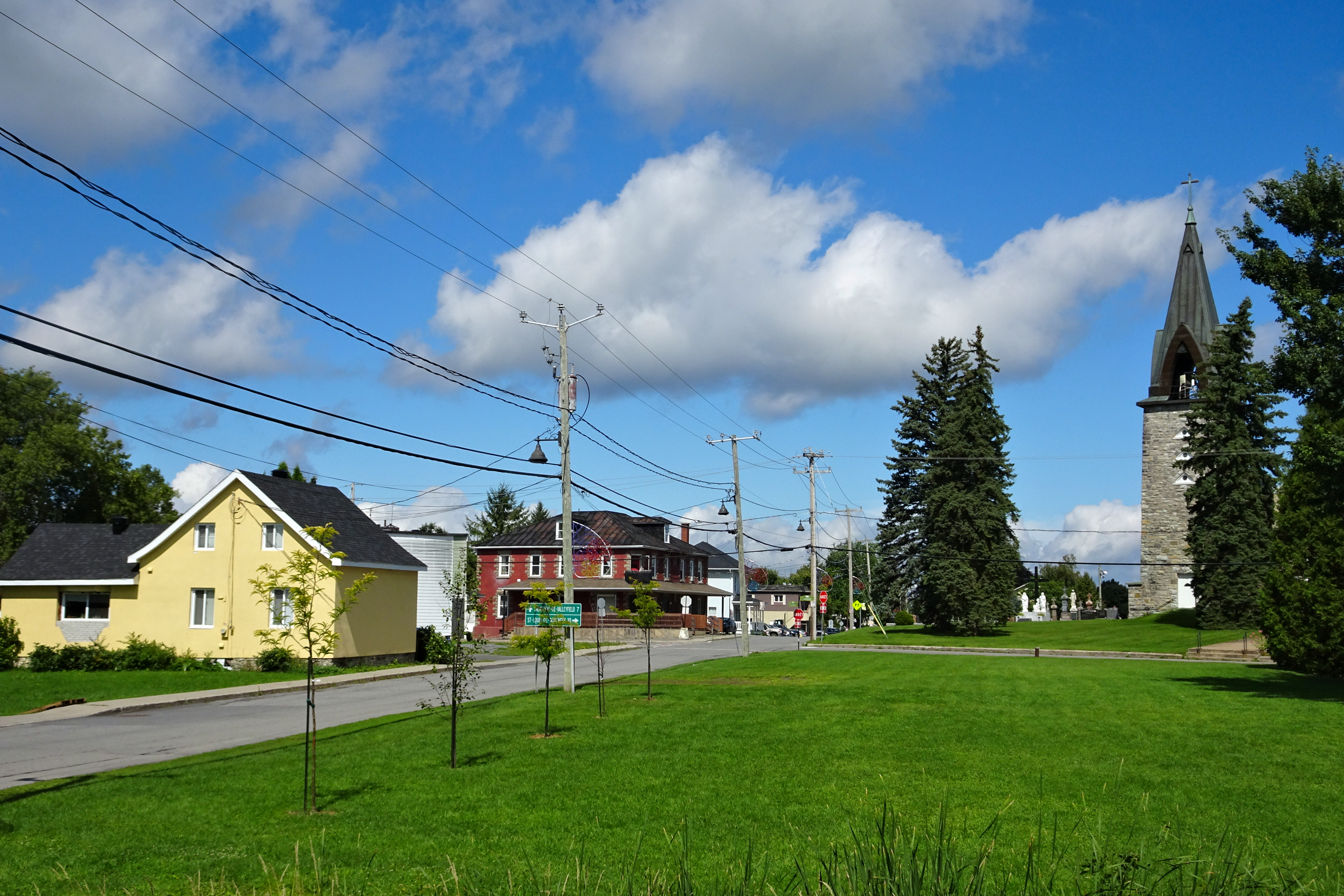

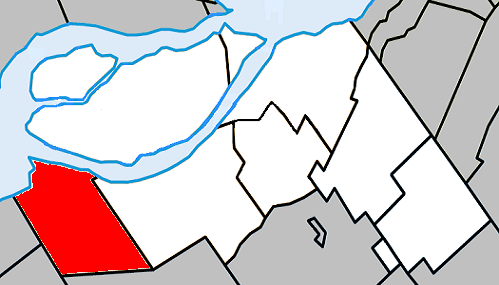
- Location within Beauharnois-Salaberry RCM

- Location in southern Quebec
- Coordinates: 45.18°N 74.13°W
- Country: Canada
- Province: Quebec
- Region: Montérégie
- RCM: Beauharnois-Salaberry
- Constituted: July 1, 1855

Government
  - Mayor: Jean-François Gendron
  - Federal riding: Beauharnois—Salaberry
  - Prov. riding: Beauharnois

Area
  - Total: 62.29 km^{2} (24.05 sq mi)
  - Land: 57.69 km^{2} (22.27 sq mi)

Population (2021)
  - Total: 1,852
  - Density: 32.1/km^{2} (83/sq mi)
  - Pop (2016-21): ▲12.0%
  - Dwellings: 896
- Time zone: UTC−5 (EST)
  - Summer (DST): UTC−4 (EDT)
- Postal code(s): J0S 1W0
- Area codes: 450 and 579
- Highways: R-132 R-201 R-236
- Website: www.st-stanislas-de-kostka.ca

Saint-Stanislas-de-Kostka is a municipality of Quebec, Canada, located within the Beauharnois-Salaberry Regional County Municipality in the Montérégie administrative region. The population as of the Canada 2021 Census was 1,852.

== Geography ==
=== Communities ===
In addition to the namesake main population centre, the following locations reside within the municipality's boundaries:

- Baie-des-Brises (45°11′55″N 74°25′37″W) – a hamlet situated on Baie des Brises to the northwest.
- Hungry Bay (45°13′06″N 74°09′27″W) – a hamlet situated on Baie Hungry to the northeast.

=== Lakes & Rivers ===
The following waterways pass through or are situated within the municipality's boundaries:

- Baie des Brises (45°12′23″N 74°10′07″W) – a bay located on the Saint Lawrence River.
- Baie Hungry (45°13′02″N 74°09′46″W) – a bay located on the Saint Lawrence River.

== History ==
The municipality was established in 1855 as the Parish Municipality of Saint-Stanislas-de-Kostka, taking its name from the parish of Saint-Stanislas-Kostka (formed in 1853), which in turn was named after Stanislaus Kostka.

In 1920 and in 1938, the settlement experienced two large fires that practically wiped it out.

In 2008, the parish municipality changed statutes to became a regular municipality.

== Demographics ==
=== Population ===
Historical Census Data - Saint-Stanislas-de-Kostka, Quebec

| Year | Pop. | ±% |
|---|---|---|
| 1921 | 1,018 | — |
| 1931 | 950 | −6.7% |
| 1941 | 977 | +2.8% |
| 1951 | 926 | −5.2% |
| 1956 | 920 | −0.6% |
| 1961 | 921 | +0.1% |

| Year | Pop. | ±% |
|---|---|---|
| 1966 | 1,117 | +21.3% |
| 1971 | 1,149 | +2.9% |
| 1976 | 1,216 | +5.8% |
| 1981 | 1,426 | +17.3% |
| 1986 | 1,522 | +6.7% |
| 1991 | 1,590 | +4.5% |

| Year | Pop. | ±% |
|---|---|---|
| 1996 | 1,643 | +3.3% |
| 2001 | 1,630 | −0.8% |
| 2006 | 1,668 | +2.3% |
| 2011 | 1,553 | −6.9% |
| 2016 | 1,654 | +6.5% |
| 2021 | 1,852 | +12.0% |

Source: Statistics Canada

Canada census – Saint-Stanislas-de-Kostka community profile

| | 2021 | 2016 | 2011 |
| Population | 1,852 (+12.0% from 2016) | 1,654 (+6.5% from 2011) | 1,553 (-6.9% from 2006) |
| Land area | 57.69 km^{2} (22.27 sq mi) | 57.72 km^{2} (22.29 sq mi) | 57.69 km^{2} (22.27 sq mi) |
| Population density | 32.1/km^{2} (83/sq mi) | 28.7/km^{2} (74/sq mi) | 26.9/km^{2} (70/sq mi) |
| Median age | 44.8 (M: 45.6, F: 44.0) | 48.1 (M: 47.0, F: 49.0) | 46.9 (M: 46.6, F: 47.1) |
| Private dwellings | 896 (total) 788 (occupied) | 877 (total) 725 (occupied) | 732 (total) |
| Median household income | $80,000 | $63,616 | $.N/A |

Notes: 2011 income data for this area has been suppressed for data quality or confidentiality reasons.
References: 2021 2016 2011

=== Language ===
Canada Census Mother Tongue - Saint-Stanislas-de-Kostka, Quebec
| Census | Total | French | | | English | | | French & English | | | Other | | |
| Year | Responses | Count | Trend | Pop % | Count | Trend | Pop % | Count | Trend | Pop % | Count | Trend | Pop % |
| 2021 | 1,855 | 1,750 | ▲11.1% | 94.3% | 55 | ▼8.3% | 3.0% | 25 | ▲66.7% | 1.3% | 20 | ▲100.0% | 1.1% |
| 2016 | 1,655 | 1,575 | ▲9.0% | 95.2% | 60 | ▼14.3% | 3.6% | 15 | ▲50.0% | 0.9% | 10 | ▲100.0% | 0.6% |
| 2011 | 1,530 | 1,445 | ▼8.0% | 94.4% | 70 | ▲7.7% | 4.6% | 10 | ▲ n/a% | 0.7% | 5 | ▼75.0% | 0.3% |
| 2006 | 1,655 | 1,570 | ▲1.9% | 94.9% | 65 | ▲225.0% | 3.9% | 0 | 0.0% | 0.0% | 20 | ▼60.0% | 1.2% |
| 2001 | 1,610 | 1,540 | ▼1.3% | 95.7% | 20 | ▼60.0% | 1.2% | 0 | 0.0% | 0.0% | 50 | ▲400.0% | 3.1% |
| 1996 | 1,620 | 1,560 | n/a | 96.3% | 50 | n/a | 3.1% | 0 | n/a | 0.0% | 10 | n/a | 0.6% |

== Local government ==
List of former mayors:

- Barnabé Deschamps (1877–1878)
- Henri Sauvé (1884–1890)
- Antoine Leduc (1890–1891)
- Félix Cardinal (1891–1892)
- Narcisse Perras (1892–1897)
- Dosithée D'Aoust (1897–1899)
- Adélard Raymond (1899–1900)
- Joseph Dolor Laberge (1902–1906)
- Joseph Hormisdas Lalondes (1906–1908)
- Alexis Lemieux (1908–1911)
- Joseph Ovila Legault (1911–1913)
- Amable Longtin (1913–1916)
- Joseph Girouard (1916–1919)
- Joseph Laframboise (1919–1919)
- Amable Lemieux (1919–1923)
- Joseph Daoust (1923–1927)
- Omer Vachon (1927–1929)
- Pierre Lapointe (1929–1935)
- Frédéric Debonville (1935–1937)
- Joseph Alfred Potvin dit Montpetit (1937–1941)
- Joseph Stanislas Poirier (1941–1945)
- Émile Brosseau (1945–1962, 1965–1968)
- Eugène Pilon (1962–1965)
- Joseph-Elzéar Maheu (1968–1977)
- Gilles Demers (1977–1992)
- Joseph Stanislas Léonide Legault (1992–2000)
- Maurice Vaudrin (2000–2005)
- Gilles Boulé (2005–2009)
- Jean Pierre Gaboury (2009–2013)
- Caroline Huot (2013–2021)
- Jean-François Gendron (2021–present)

== See also ==
- Beauharnois Canal
- Saint-Louis River (Beauharnois)
- List of municipalities in Quebec
