= Beauharnois, Quebec =

Beauharnois
- City
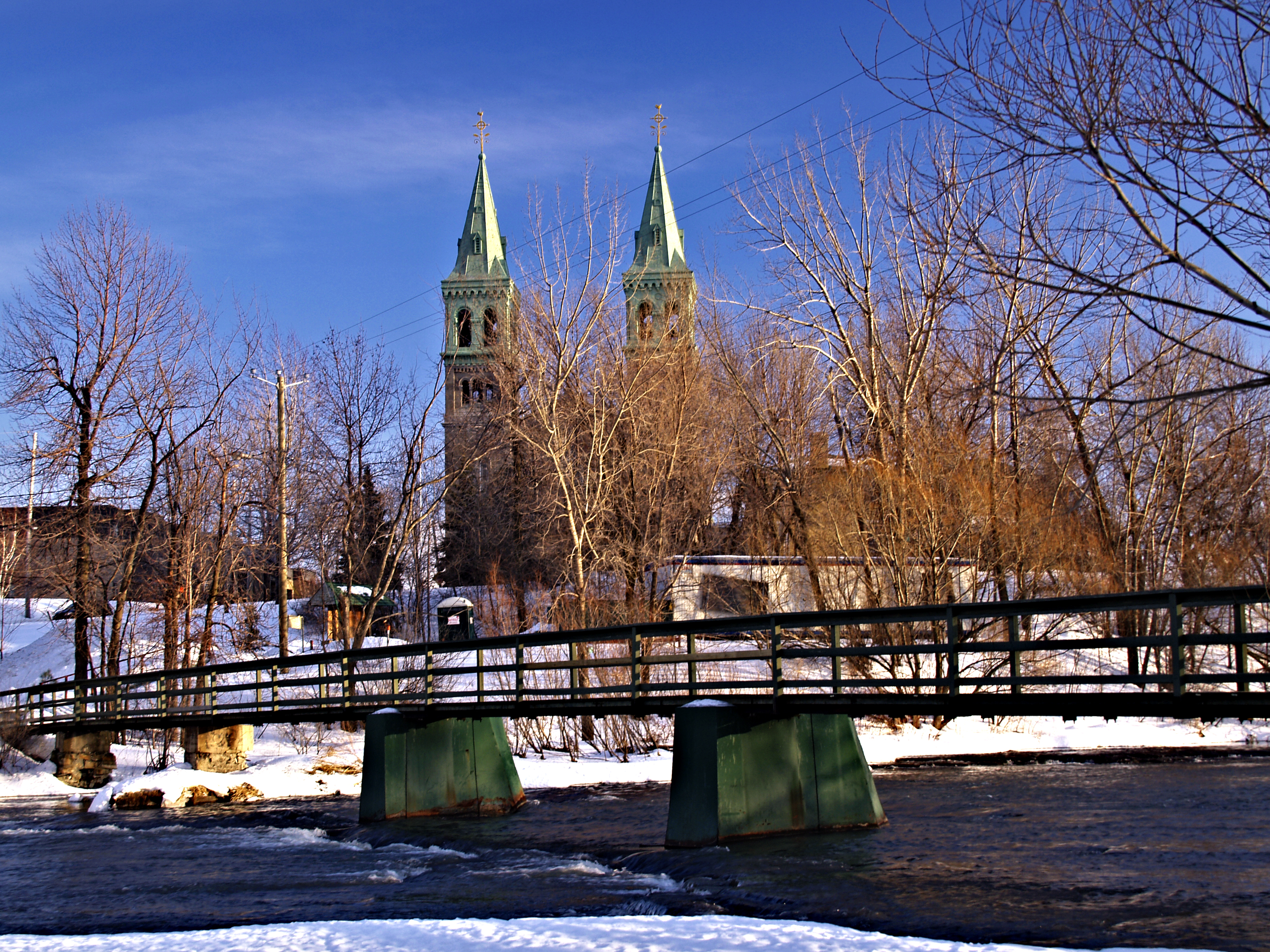

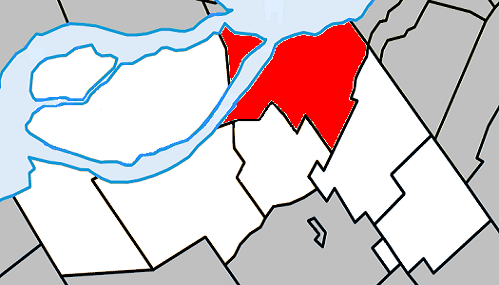
- Location within Beauharnois-Salaberry RCM

- Location in southern Quebec
- Coordinates: 45°19′N 73°52′W
- Country: Canada
- Province: Quebec
- Region: Montérégie
- RCM: Beauharnois-Salaberry
- Constituted: January 1, 2002

Government
  - Mayor: Alain Dubuc
  - Federal riding: Beauharnois—Salaberry—Soulanges—Huntingdon
  - Prov. riding: Beauharnois

Area
  - Total: 83.40 km^{2} (32.20 sq mi)
  - Land: 68.22 km^{2} (26.34 sq mi)

Population (2021)
  - Total: 13,638
  - Density: 199.9/km^{2} (518/sq mi)
  - Pop (2016-21): ▲5.9%
  - Dwellings: 6,451
- Time zone: UTC−5 (EST)
  - Summer (DST): UTC−4 (EDT)
- Postal code(s): J6N
- Area codes: 450 and 579
- Highways A-30: R-132; R-205; R-236
- Website: ville.beauharnois.qc.ca

Beauharnois (/boʊˈhɑːrnwɑː/; French pronunciation: [boaʁnwa]) is a city located in the Beauharnois-Salaberry Regional County Municipality of southwestern Quebec, Canada, and is part of the Greater Montreal Area. The city's population as of the Canada 2021 Census was 13,638. It is home to the Beauharnois Hydroelectric Power Station, as well as the Beauharnois Lock of the Saint Lawrence Seaway.

== History ==
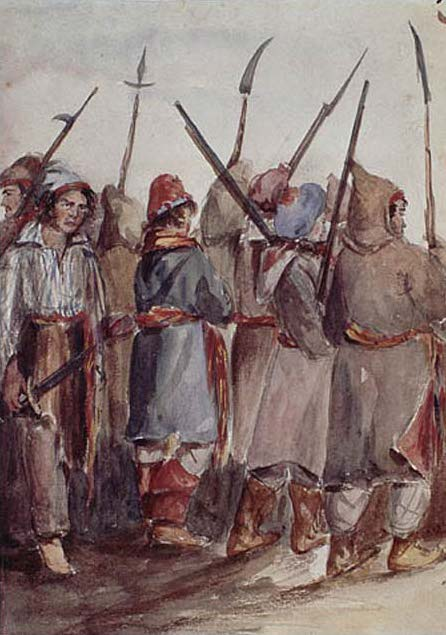
Irregular soldiers in 19th-century Beauharnois by Katherine Ellice (who was held prisoner here)

During the Lower Canada Rebellion, the Battle of Beauharnois was fought in 1838, between Lower Canada loyalists and Patriote rebels. After Edward Ellice and his family were taken prisoner by rebels, the townspeople rebelled. The British were able to quash the rebellion and captured over a hundred Patriote rebels.

The Beauharnois Canal was dug between 1842 and 1845 to connect the lakes Saint-Louis and Saint-Francois as part of a larger project that included the expansion of the Lachine canal. During these years, however, a series of labor conflicts emerged during the canal's construction. On June 3, 1843, a strike began at the canal's construction site. A battle ensued between the striking workers and employers, resulting in the death of five workers and 50 additional injured. The violence unleashed during the strike represented the bloodiest repression against workers in Canadian history.

As part of the 2000–2006 municipal reorganization in Quebec, the neighbouring towns of Maple Grove and Melocheville were amalgamated into Beauharnois on January 1, 2002.

== Geography ==
=== Communities ===
In addition to the main population centre of Beauharnois, the following locations are within the municipality's boundaries:

- Domaine-de-la-Pointe-des-Érables (45°19′29″N 73°51′11″W) – a residential area north of Maple Grove
- Maple Grove (45°19′15″N 73°50′20″W) – a former municipality that makes up the northeast boundary of Beauharnois
- Melocheville (45°19′02″N 73°56′15″W) – a former municipality that makes up the western boundary of Beauharnois, located on the west shore of the Beauharnois Canal
- Parc-Tisseur (45°17′42″N 73°53′02″W) – a residential area in southern Beauharnois
- Rivière-Nord (45°00′34″N 74°24′04″W) – a hamlet in southern Beauharnois
- Saint-Paul (45°18′33″N 73°53′51″W) – a residential area located on Route 205

=== Lakes & rivers ===
The following waterways pass through or are situated within the municipality's boundaries:

- Rivière Saint-Louis (45°18′55″N 73°52′49″W) – runs south to north through the city centre, down Chute de la Rivière Saint Louis, emptying into the Saint Lawrence River.

== Demographics ==
Historical census data - Beauharnois, Quebec

Year	Pop.	±%
1921	2,250	—
1931	3,729	+65.7%
1941	3,550	−4.8%
1951	5,694	+60.4%
1956	6,774	+19.0%
1961	8,704	+28.5%
1966	8,810	+1.2%

Year	Pop.	±%
1971	8,121	−7.8%
1976	7,665	−5.6%
1981	7,025	−8.3%
1986	6,519	−7.2%
1991	6,449	−1.1%
1996	6,435	−0.2%
2001	6,387	−0.7%

Year	Pop.	±%
2002+	11,454	+79.3%
2006	11,918	+4.1%
2011	12,011	+0.8%
2016	12,884	+7.3%
2021	13,638	+5.9%

Amalgamated with Maple Grove and Melocheville on January 1, 2002.
Source: Statistics Canada

In the 2021 Census of Population conducted by Statistics Canada, Beauharnois had a population of 13,638 living in 6,293 of its 6,451 total private dwellings, a change of 5.9% from its 2016 population of 12,884. With a land area of 68.22 km^{2} (26.34 sq mi), it had a population density of 199.9/km^{2} (517.8/sq mi) in 2021.

Canada census – Beauharnois community profile

	2021	2016	2011
Population	13,638 (+5.9% from 2016)	12,884 (+7.3% from 2011)	12,011 (+0.8% from 2006)
Land area	68.22 km^{2} (26.34 sq mi)	69.31 km^{2} (26.76 sq mi)	69.09 km^{2} (26.68 sq mi)
Population density	199.9/km^{2} (518/sq mi)	185.9/km^{2} (481/sq mi)	173.9/km^{2} (450/sq mi)
Median age	43.2 (M: 42.0, F: 44.4)	46.1 (M: 45.2, F: 46.9)	46.5 (M: 45.8, F: 47.2)
Private dwellings	6,451 (total) 6,293 (occupied)	6,072 (total)	5,585 (total)
Median household income	$69,500	$55,706	$51,185

Notes: Amalgamated with Maple Grove and Melocheville on January 1, 2002.
References: 2021 2016 2011

Canada Census mother tongue - Beauharnois, Quebec
Census	Total	French			English			French & English			Other		
Year	Responses	Count	Trend	Pop %	Count	Trend	Pop %	Count	Trend	Pop %	Count	Trend	Pop %
2016	12,670	11,865	▲5.5%	93.65%	505	▲9.8%	3.98%	115	▲9.5%	0.91%	185	▲48%	1.46%
2011	11,935	11,245	▲1.7%	94.22%	460	▲16.5%	3.85%	105	▲133.3%	0.88%	125	▼37.5%	1.05%
2006	11,695	11,055	▲84.6%	94.53%	395	▲163.3%	3.38%	45	▼30.8%	0.38%	200	▲471.4%	1.71%
2001	6,240	5,990	▼1.1%	95.99%	150	▲15.4%	2.40%	65	▲62.5%	1.04%	35	▼12.5%	0.56%
1996	6,265	6,055	n/a	98.75%	130	n/a	0.69%	40	n/a	0.33%	40	n/a	0.23%
Amalgamated with Maple Grove and Melocheville on January 1, 2002

== Economy ==
In January 2012, OVH renovated a former aluminum smelter into its first Canadian data centre in Beauharnois, choosing the location for its proximity to the Beauharnois Hydroelectric Power Station, which is ample enough to furnish its large electrical demands. The data centre's success gave way to further investments in Canadian data centres, leading to the opening of another data centre in Toronto in March 2024.

== See also ==
- List of cities in Quebec
- Beauharnois Canal
