= Quebec Route 236 =

Highway in Quebec, Canada

Coordinates: 45.2401°N 73.9119°W

Route 236

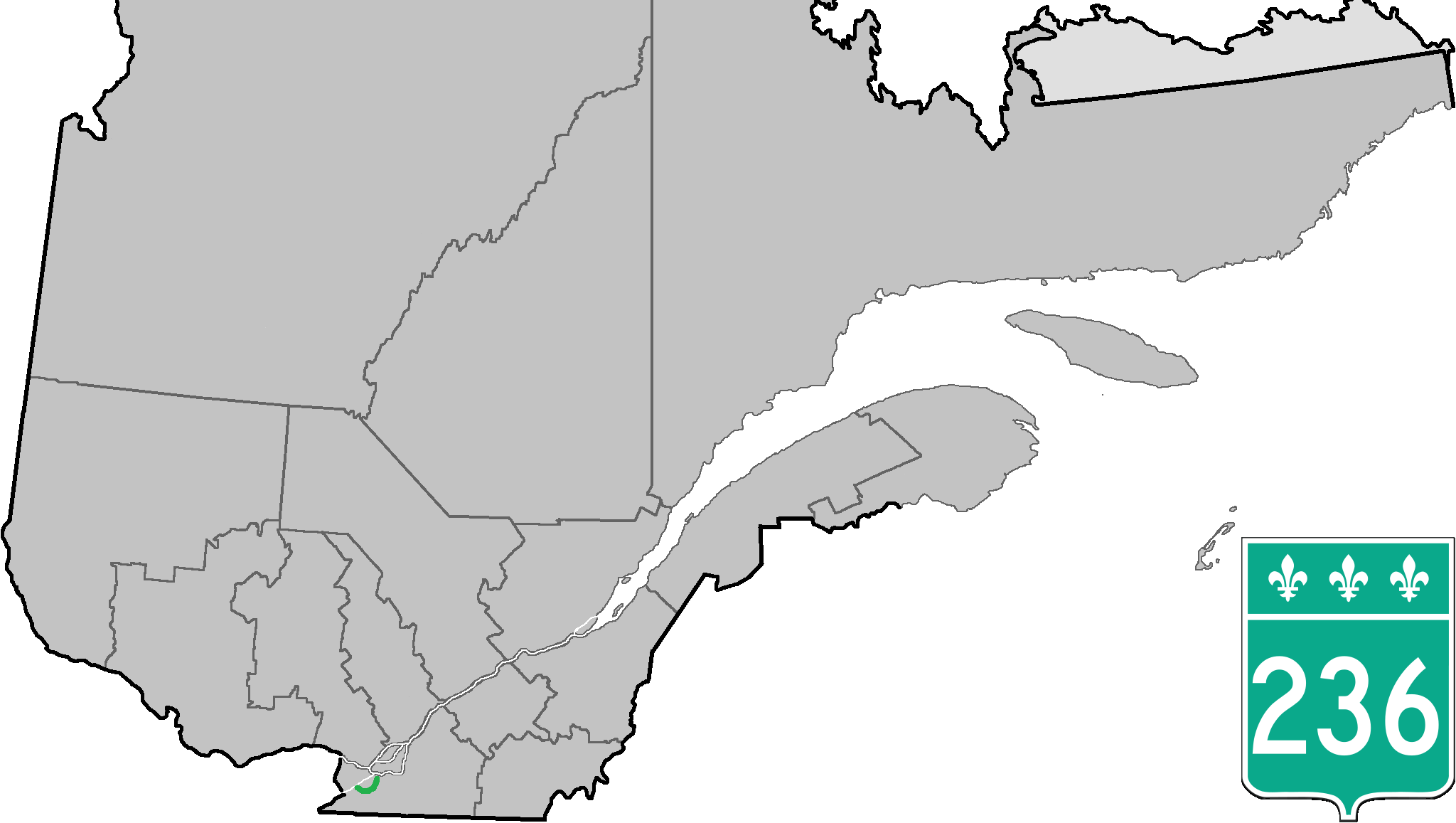

Route information
- Maintained by Transports Québec
- Length: 29.4 km (18.3 mi)

Major junctions
- West end: R-132 in Saint-Stanislas-de-Kostka
- R-201 in Saint-Louis-de-Gonzague; A-30 in Beauharnois
- East end: R-132 in Beauharnois

Location
- Country: Canada
- Province: Quebec

Highway system
- Quebec provincial highways; Autoroutes; List; Former
← R-235	→ R-237

Route 236 is a two-lane east/west highway on the south shore of the Saint Lawrence River in the Montérégie region of Quebec, Canada. Its western terminus is in Saint-Stanislas-de-Kostka at the junction of Route 132 and the eastern terminus is at the junction of Route 132 again, in Beauharnois.

Up until the 1980s, Route 236 also used to extend further west, with an additional stretch between Sainte-Barbe and the hamlet of Cazaville, part of Saint-Anicet.

== Municipalities along Route 236 ==
- Saint-Stanislas-de-Kostka
- Saint-Louis-de-Gonzague
- Saint-Étienne-de-Beauharnois
- Beauharnois
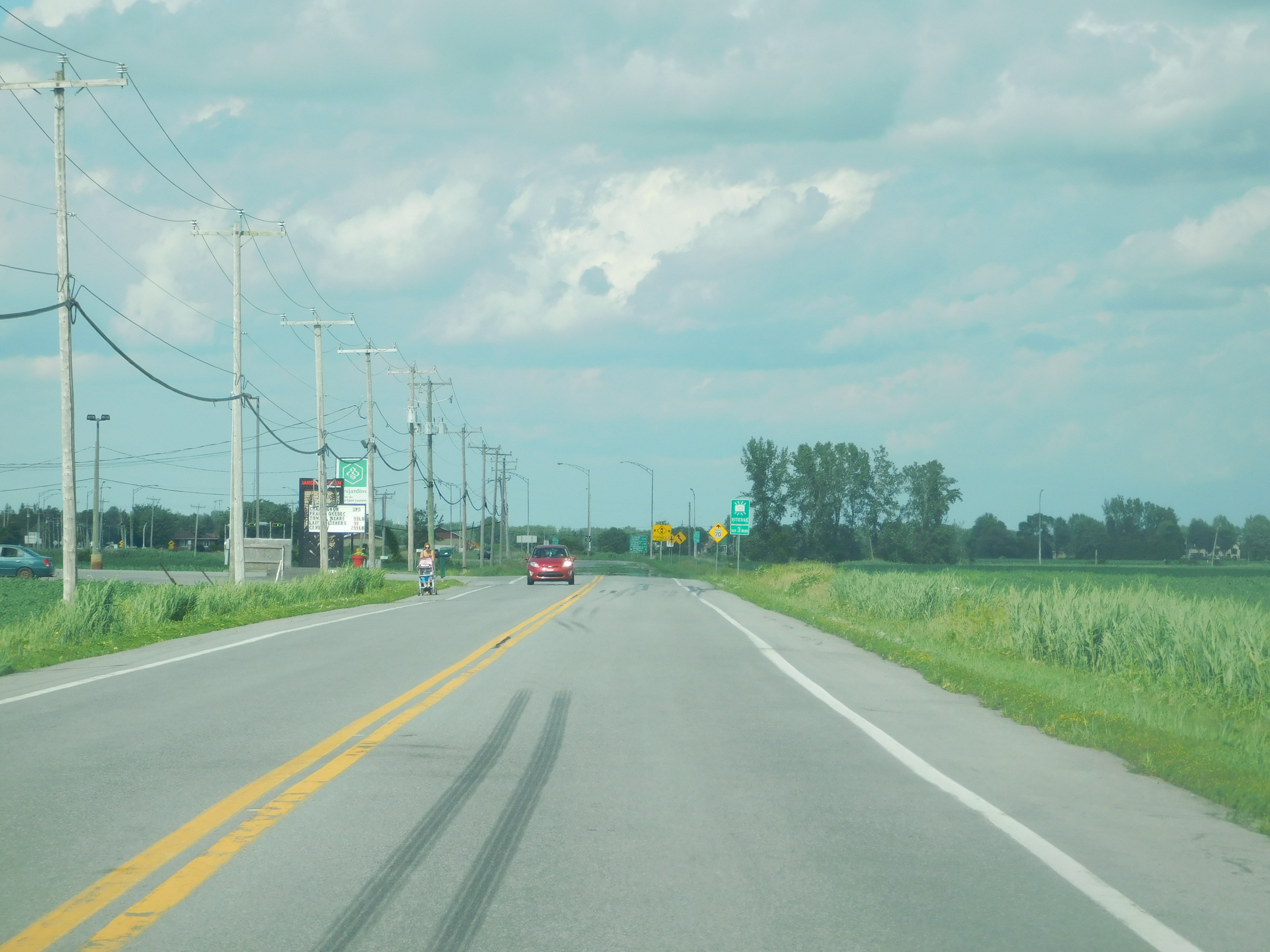
Junction of Routes 236 and 132, near the western end.

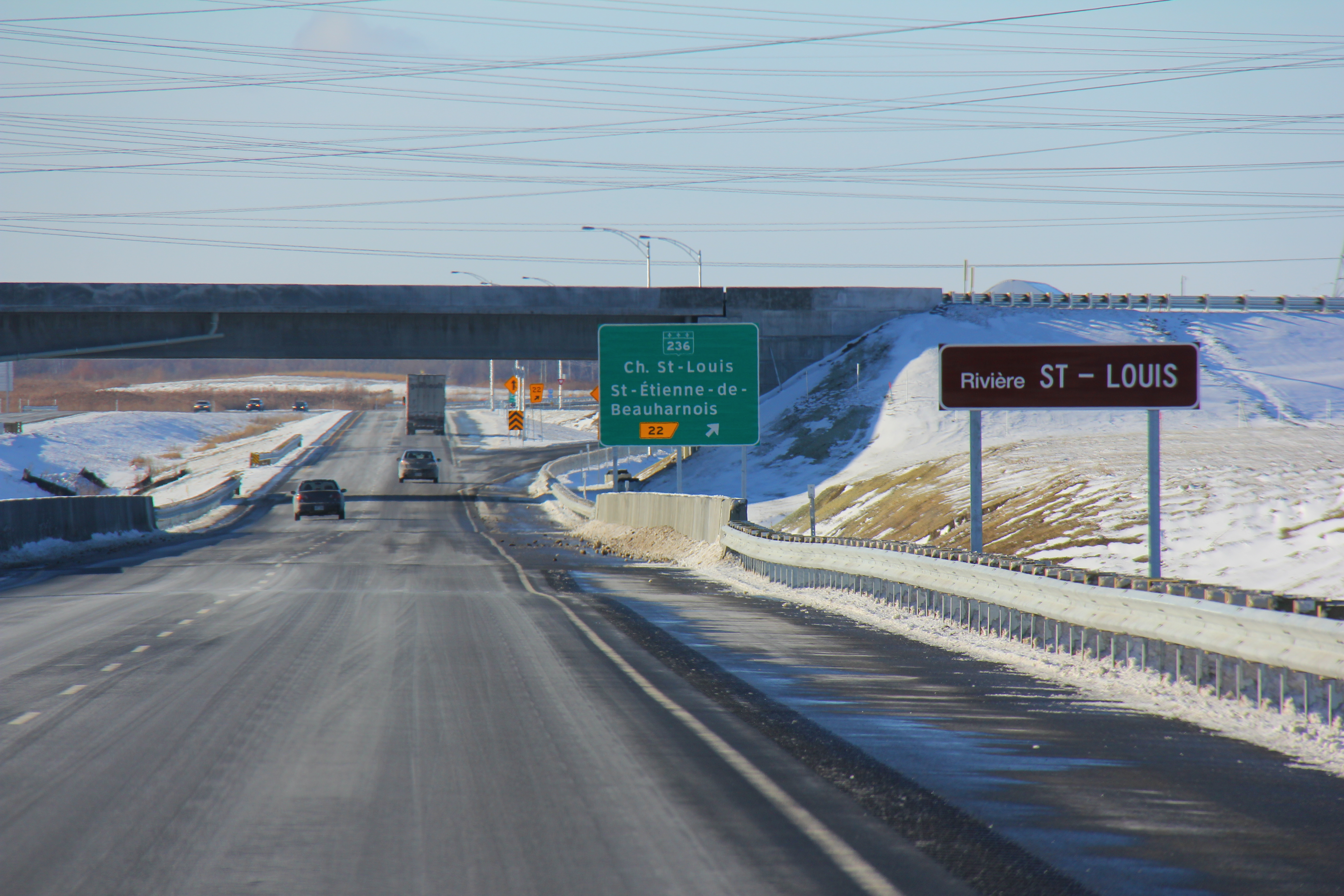
Autoroute 30 interchange with Route 236.

== See also ==
- List of Quebec provincial highways
