= Saint-Louis-de-Gonzague, Montérégie, Quebec =

Saint-Louis-de-Gonzague
- Parish municipality
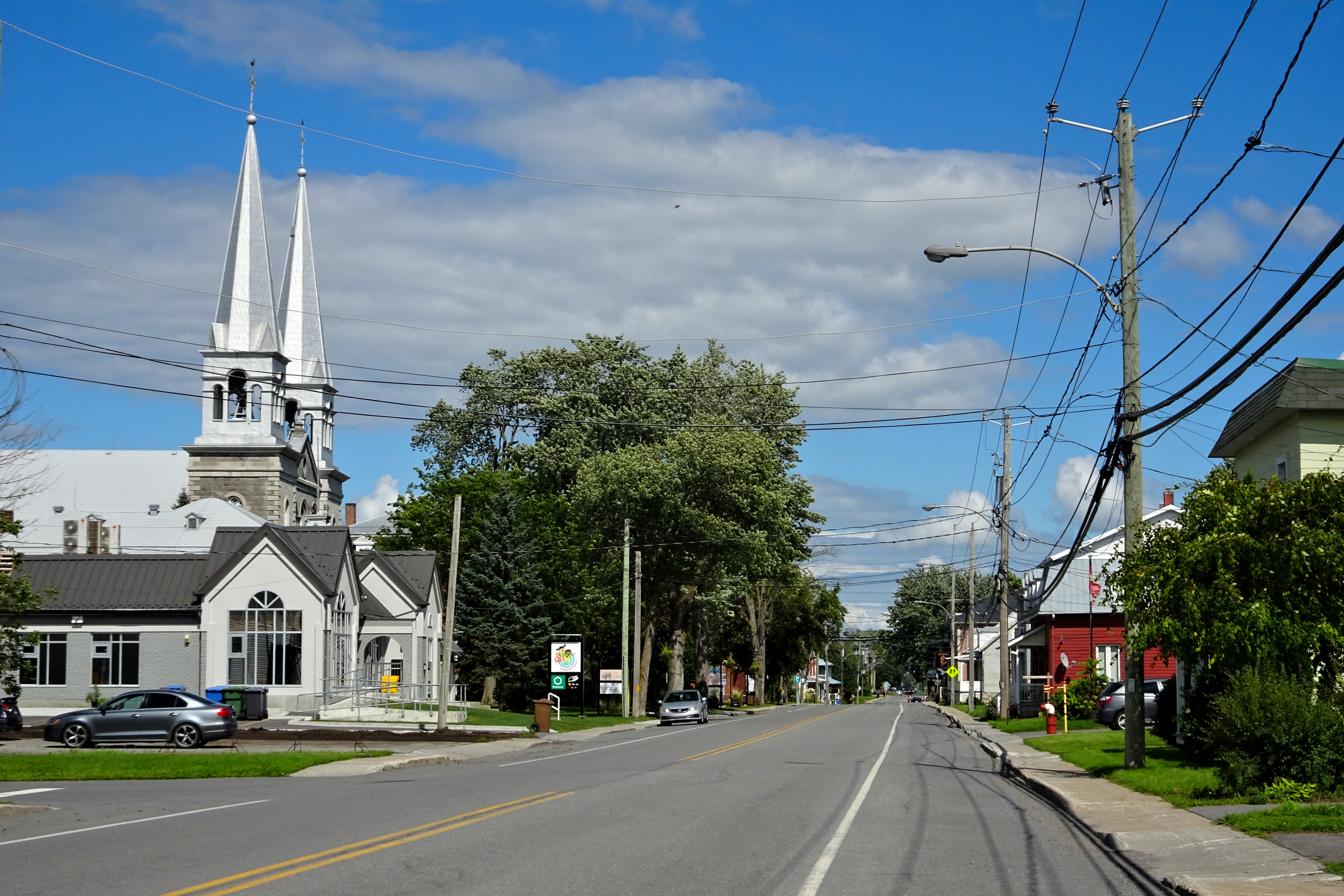
- Route 236 through St-Louis-de-Gonzague

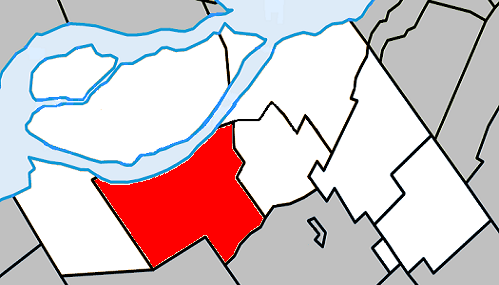
- Location within Beauharnois-Salaberry RCM

- Location in southern Quebec
- Coordinates: 45.2°N 73.98°W
- Country: Canada
- Province: Quebec
- Region: Montérégie
- RCM: Beauharnois-Salaberry
- Constituted: July 1, 1855

Government
  - Mayor: Yves Daoust
  - Federal riding: Salaberry—Suroît
  - Prov. riding: Beauharnois

Area
  - Total: 89.15 km^{2} (34.42 sq mi)
  - Land: 77.04 km^{2} (29.75 sq mi)

Population (2021)
  - Total: 1,950
  - Density: 25.3/km^{2} (66/sq mi)
  - Pop (2016-21): ▲31.7%
  - Dwellings: 777
- Time zone: UTC−5 (EST)
  - Summer (DST): UTC−4 (EDT)
- Postal code(s): J0S 1T0
- Area codes: 450 and 579
- Highways: R-201 R-236
- Website: sldg.ca

Saint-Louis-de-Gonzague (French pronunciation: [sɛ̃ lwi də ɡɔ̃zaɡ]) is a parish municipality in the Beauharnois-Salaberry Regional County Municipality in the Montérégie region of Quebec, Canada. The population as of the 2021 Canadian census was 1,950.

The town centre is located along the banks of the Saint-Louis River.

== History ==
One of the first settler in the area was Charles Larocque (1784-1849), who was deputy for Vaudreuil in the Legislative Assembly of Lower Canada from 1833 to 1838. He managed the first general store in the village, that was originally named after him: Rocqueville, or sometimes spelled Rocque-ville or Larocqueville. Other original settlers came mostly from Saint-Timothée, Les Cèdres, and Île Perrot in the middle of the 19th century.

In 1845, the parish was formed, named after the Italian Jesuit Luigi Gonzaga. In 1855, the Parish Municipality of Saint-Louis-de-Gonzague was founded.

== Demographics ==
In the 2021 Census of Population conducted by Statistics Canada, Saint-Louis-de-Gonzague had a population of 1,950 living in 757 of its 777 total private dwellings, a change of 31.7% from its 2016 population of 1,481. With a land area of 77.04 km^{2} (29.75 sq mi), it had a population density of 25.3/km^{2} (65.6/sq mi) in 2021.

Canada census – Saint-Louis-de-Gonzague community profile

	2021	2016	2011
Population	1,950 (+31.7% from 2016)	1,481 (+6.6% from 2011)	1,389 (-1.1% from 2006)
Land area	77.04 km^{2} (29.75 sq mi)	79.83 km^{2} (30.82 sq mi)	79.42 km^{2} (30.66 sq mi)
Population density	25.3/km^{2} (66/sq mi)	18.6/km^{2} (48/sq mi)	17.5/km^{2} (45/sq mi)
Median age	36.0 (M: 36.4, F: 36.0)	40.2 (M: 39.6, F: 40.6)	39.6 (M: 39.2, F: 40.3)
Private dwellings	777 (total) 757 (occupied)	602 (total)	548 (total)
Median household income	$87,000	$73,557	$64,906

References: 2021 2016 2011

Historical Census Data - Saint-Louis-de-Gonzague, Montérégie, Quebec

Year	Pop.	±%
1921	1,839	—
1931	1,772	−3.6%
1941	1,370	−22.7%
1951	1,332	−2.8%
1956	1,436	+7.8%
1961	1,460	+1.7%

Year	Pop.	±%
1966	1,371	−6.1%
1971	1,356	−1.1%
1976	1,317	−2.9%
1981	1,378	+4.6%
1986	1,387	+0.7%
1991	1,413	+1.9%

Year	Pop.	±%
1996	1,380	−2.3%
2001	1,357	−1.7%
2006	1,404	+3.5%
2011	1,389	−1.1%
2016	1,481	+6.6%
2021	1,950	+31.7%

Source: Statistics Canada

Canada Census Mother Tongue - Saint-Louis-de-Gonzague, Montérégie, Quebec
Census	Total	French			English			French & English			Other		
Year	Responses	Count	Trend	Pop %	Count	Trend	Pop %	Count	Trend	Pop %	Count	Trend	Pop %
2021	1,950	1,850	▲28.8%	94.9%	55	▲57.1%	2.8%	35	▲250.0%	1.8%	15	▲200.0%	0.8%
2016	1,480	1,425	▲6.3%	96.3%	35	0.0%	2.4%	10	0.0%	0.7%	5	0.0%	0.3%
2011	1,390	1,340	▲5.9%	96.4%	35	▲75.0%	2.5%	10	▼86.7%	0.7%	5	▼93.3%	0.4%
2006	1,385	1,265	▼3.1%	91.3%	20	▼33.3%	1.4%	25	▲150.0%	1.8%	75	▲650.0%	5.4%
2001	1,355	1,305	▼3.3%	96.3%	30	▼14.3%	2.2%	10	0.0%	0.7%	10	▲ n/a%	0.7%
1996	1,395	1,350	n/a	96.8%	35	n/a	2.5%	10	n/a	0.7%	0	n/a	0.0%

== Local government ==
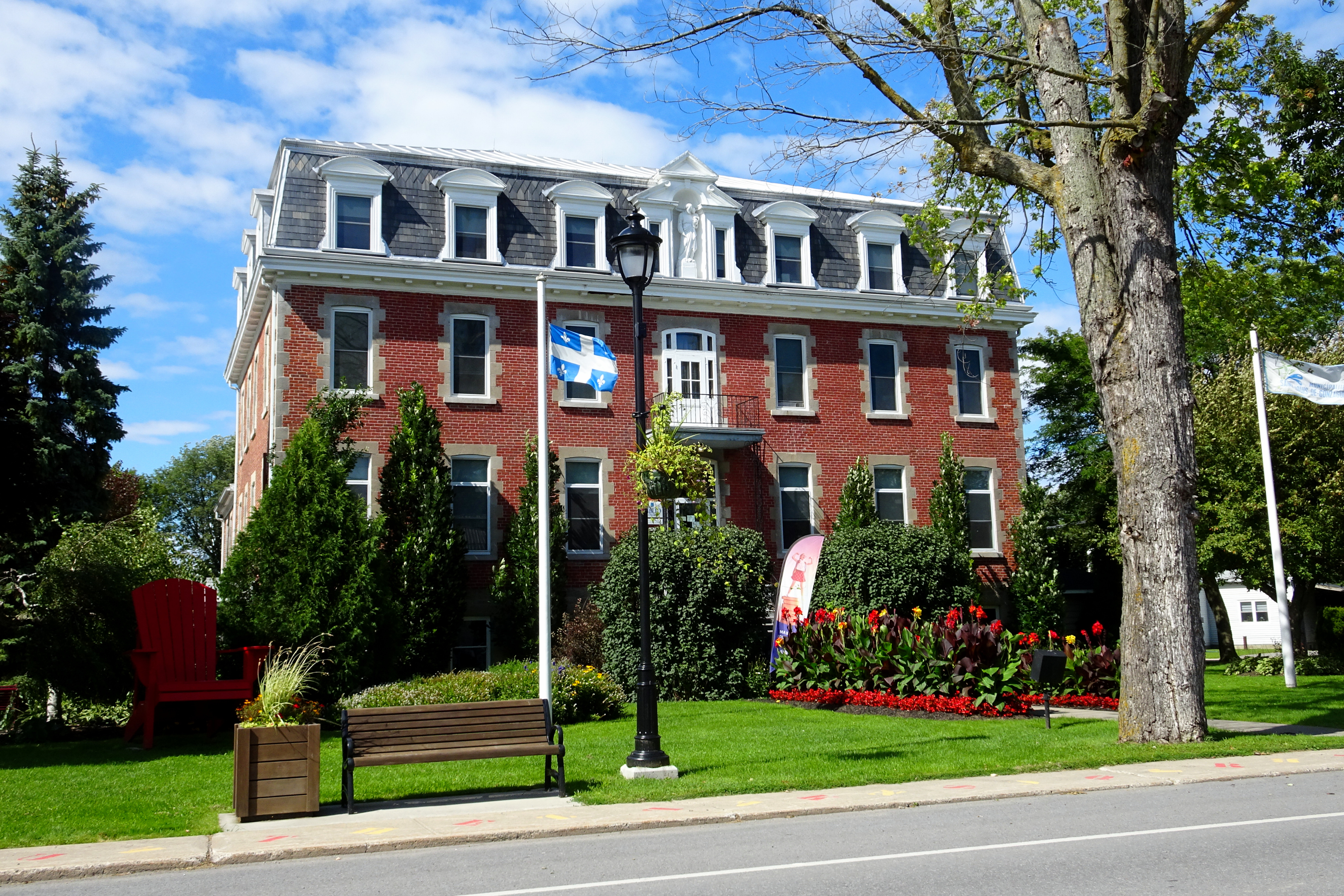
Municipal hall

List of former mayors:

- Jean François Gégoux (1856–1857)
- Charles Archambault (1857–1857)
- Jean Baptiste Bougie (1857–1868)
- Moïse Viau (1868–1872)
- Louis Pierre Coutlée (1872–1874)
- Joseph Bougie (1874–1875)
- Jean Baptiste Mire (1875–1886)
- Louis Bougie (1886–1888)
- Joseph Gagnier (1888–1891)
- Joseph Boyer (1891–1900)
- Hermène Payant (1900–1904)
- Louis Julien Pilon (1904–1906)
- Louis Billet (1906–1907)
- François Alfred Pilon (1907–1909)
- Abraham Jonathas Boyer (1909–1911)
- Charles Onésiphore Myre (1911–1912)
- Émérie Vinet (1912–1914)
- Louis Leduc (1914–1916)
- Louis Archambault (1916–1923)
- Joseph Jérôme Monpetit (1923–1931)
- Joseph Maheu (1931)
- Joachim Jean Baptiste Primeau (1931–1937)
- Joseph Dominat Daoust (1937–1951)
- Joseph Zénon Donat Meloche (1951–1961)
- Joseph Armand Ovila Houle (1961–1968)
- Joseph Arthur René Daoust (1968–1969)
- Joseph Zénon Oscar Billette (1969–1974)
- Joseph Gerard Marc-Hubert Pagé (1974–1978)
- Joseph Léo Victor Brault (1978–1983)
- Joseph-Augustin-Dominique Julien (1983–1989)
- Yves Daoust (1989–present)

== Notable people ==
- Alexandra Labelle, professional ice hockey player

== See also ==
- Beauharnois Canal
- List of parish municipalities in Quebec
