= Beauharnois-Salaberry Regional County Municipality =

Beauharnois-Salaberry
- Regional county municipality
- Location in province of Quebec
- Coordinates: 45.32°N 73.93°W
- Country: Canada
- Province: Quebec
- Region: Montérégie
- Effective: January 1, 1982
- County seat: Beauharnois

Government
  - Type: Prefecture
  - Prefect: Yves Daoust

Area
  - Total: 523.10 km^{2} (201.97 sq mi)
  - Land: 471.26 km^{2} (181.95 sq mi)

Population (2021)
  - Total: 68,322
  - Density: 145.8/km^{2} (378/sq mi)
  - Change 2011–2021: ▲10.3%
  - Dwellings: 31,245
- Time zone: UTC−5 (EST)
  - Summer (DST): UTC−4 (EDT)
- Area codes: 450 and 579
- Website: mrcbhs.ca

Beauharnois-Salaberry (French pronunciation: [boaʁnwa salabɛʁi]) is a regional county municipality in the Montérégie region of Quebec, Canada. Its seat is Beauharnois.

== History ==
The implementation of new governance structures across Quebec meant RCMs had differing effective formation dates. Specifically, the Beauharnois-Salaberry Regional County Municipality became effective on 1 January 1982, replacing the traditional county structure. The RCM was formed by combining the historic counties of Beauharnois and Châteauguay. While some administrative transitions occurred in the early 1980s, 1 January 1982 marks the effective date for this restructuring.

== Subdivisions ==
There are 7 subdivisions within the RCM:

Cities & Towns (2)

- Beauharnois
- Salaberry-de-Valleyfield

Municipalities (4)

- Saint-Étienne-de-Beauharnois
- Saint-Stanislas-de-Kostka
- Saint-Urbain-Premier
- Sainte-Martine

Parishes (1)

- Saint-Louis-de-Gonzague

== Demographics ==
Historical Census Data – Beauharnois-Salaberry Regional County Municipality, Quebec

Year	Pop.	±%
1991	59,785	—
1996	59,769	−0.0%
2001	59,137	−1.1%

Year	Pop.	±%
2006	60,802	+2.8%
2011	61,950	+1.9%
2016	64,320	+3.8%

Canada census – Beauharnois-Salaberry community profile

	2021	2016	2011
Population	68,322 (+6.2% from 2016)	64,320 (+3.8% from 2011)	61,950 (+1.9% from 2006)
Land area	468.48 km^{2} (180.88 sq mi)	471.26 km^{2} (181.95 sq mi)	470.68 km^{2} (181.73 sq mi)
Population density	145.8/km^{2} (378/sq mi)	136.5/km^{2} (354/sq mi)	131.6/km^{2} (341/sq mi)
Median age	44.8 (M: 43.6, F: 46.4)	46.5 (M: 44.7, F: 48.2)	46.1 (M: 44.6, F: 47.4)
Private dwellings	32,524 (total) 31,245 (occupied)	30,151 (total)	28,829 (total)
Median household income	$66,500	$54,509	$48,621

References: 2021 2016 2011

=== Language ===
Canada Census Mother Tongue – Beauharnois-Salaberry Regional County Municipality
Census	Total	French			English			French & English			Other		
Year	Responses	Count	Trend	Pop %	Count	Trend	Pop %	Count	Trend	Pop %	Count	Trend	Pop %
2016	63,060	59,430	▲2.5%	94.2%	2,050	▲6.5%	3.3%	595	▼7.8%	0.9%	985	▲61.5%	1.6%
2011	61,180	58,000	▲2.6%	94.80%	1,925	▲13.6%	3.15%	645	▲84.3%	1.05%	610	▼25.6%	1.00%
2006	59,405	56,540	▲2.1%	95.18%	1,695	▼4.8%	2.85%	350	▼14.6%	0.59%	820	▲60.8%	1.38%
2001	58,060	55,360	▼1.7%	95.35%	1,780	▲13.4%	3.07%	410	▼14.6%	0.71%	510	▲20.0%	0.88%
1996	58,790	56,315	n/a	95.79%	1,570	n/a	2.67%	480	n/a	0.82%	425	n/a	0.72%

== Transportation ==
=== Access routes ===
Highways and numbered routes that run through the municipality, including external routes that start or finish at the county border:

- Autoroutes
  - A-30
  - A-530
- Principal Highways
  - R-132
  - R-138
- Secondary Highways
  - R-201
  - R-203
  - R-205
  - R-207
  - R-236
- External Routes
  - None

== Attractions ==
- Beauharnois Canal
- Beauharnois Hydroelectric Generating Station (Melocheville)
- Deux-Rives Ecomuseum (Salaberry-de-Valleyfield)
- Howick Airport (Saint-Étienne-de-Beauharnois)
- Pointe-du-Bruisson Archaeological Park (Melocheville)
- Valleyfield Airport (Saint-Stanislas-de-Kostka)

Protected areas:

- Îles-de-Paix National Fauna Reserve
- Îles-de-Saint-Timothée Regional Park

== See also ==
- List of regional county municipalities and equivalent territories in Quebec
