= Quebec Autoroute 520 =

Highway in Quebec, Canada

Autoroute 520
- Autoroute Côte-de-Liesse

Route information
- Maintained by Transports Québec
- Length: 7.8 km (4.8 mi)
- Existed: 1966–present

Major junctions
- West end: A-20 in Dorval
- A-13 in Dorval
- East end: A-40 (TCH) in Montréal

Location
- Country: Canada
- Province: Quebec
- Major cities: Montréal, Dorval

Highway system
- Quebec provincial highways; Autoroutes; List; Former
← A-440	→ A-530

Autoroute 520 or the Côte-de-Liesse Expressway is an expressway that connects Montreal's Pierre Elliott Trudeau International Airport with Autoroute 20 at the expressway's western terminus and Autoroute 40 at the expressway's eastern terminus. This route serves as a link to the airport to residents living in the east of Montreal and the West Island as well as the city of Dorval.

== Exit list ==
The entire route is located in Montréal.

Location	km	mi	Exit	Destinations	Notes
Dorval			–	A-20 (Autoroute du Souvenir) / Avenue Dorval – Centre-Ville Montréal, Toronto	Traffic circle with Boulevard Bouchard (service roads); exit 56 on A-20
Dorval			1O	Aéroport P.-E.-Trudeau	No exit number eastbound
Dorval			1E	Avenue Cardinal	No exit number eastbound
Dorval			2	55th Avenue / 43rd Avenue	Eastbound access to 43rd Avenue is via exit 3
Dorval–Montréal			3	43rd Avenue / 32nd Avenue	Eastbound exit and entrance
Dorval–Montréal			4	A-13 (Autoroute Chomedey) / Montée de Liesse – Lachine, Laval, Aéroport Mirabel	Exit 3 on A-13
Montréal			5	Rue Hickmore	
Montréal			6	Boulevard Cavendish	No exit number westbound
Montréal			7	Chemin Darnley	Eastbound exit and entrance
Montréal			–	A-40 (TCH) (Autoroute Félix-Leclerc) to A-15 / R-117 (Boulevard M.-Laurin) – Québec, Pont Champlain, Ottawa, Gatineau	Exit 65 on A-40
1.000 mi = 1.609 km; 1.000 km = 0.621 mi: Incomplete access
