= Albert De Martin =

Canadian politician

Leader of the Conservative Party of Quebec
- Interim
- In office September 21, 2012 – February 23, 2013
- Preceded by: Luc Harvey
- Succeeded by: Adrien D. Pouliot

MNA for Huntingdon
- In office April 25, 2007 – November 5, 2008
- Preceded by: André Chenail
- Succeeded by: Stéphane Billette

Personal details
- Born: February 20, 1951 (age 75) Montreal, Quebec, Canada
- Party: Conservative Party of Quebec
- Other political affiliations: Conservative (federal); ADQ (2007-2011)
- Spouse: Diane Bertrand

Albert De Martin (born February 20, 1951) is a politician from Quebec, Canada. He was an Action démocratique du Québec Member of the National Assembly for the electoral district of Huntingdon from 2007 to 2008.

== Early career ==
De Martin was heavily involved in the farming and agriculture industries; he was co-owner of the local farm Fermes AJIRO 1989 Inc. for 27 years. He was also an administrator for several associations and organizations including the union of the Union des Producteurs Agricoles (Saint-Anicet branch), the local development for the Upper Saint-Lawrence region, and the Saint-Jean de Valleyfield commercial culture union.

== Politics ==
From 1987 to 2000, De Martin served as a municipal councillor in Godmanchester. De Martin was first elected to the National Assembly in the 2007 election with 43% of the vote, defeating Liberal incumbent André Chenail, who received 31%. During the election campaign, De Martin received the endorsement of controversial but influential Huntingdon Mayor Stéphane Gendron, who reportedly had stormy relations with Chenail. De Martin was defeated in the 2008 election.

De Martin later served as the interim leader of the Conservative Party of Quebec following the 2012 election after the resignation of Luc Harvey and ran for the party in Huntingdon in the 2014 election, where he placed 6th out of 7 candidates. He later ran for the Conservative Party of Canada in Salaberry—Suroît in the 2015 federal election.
