= Virginie Chaloux-Gendron =

Québécoise writer

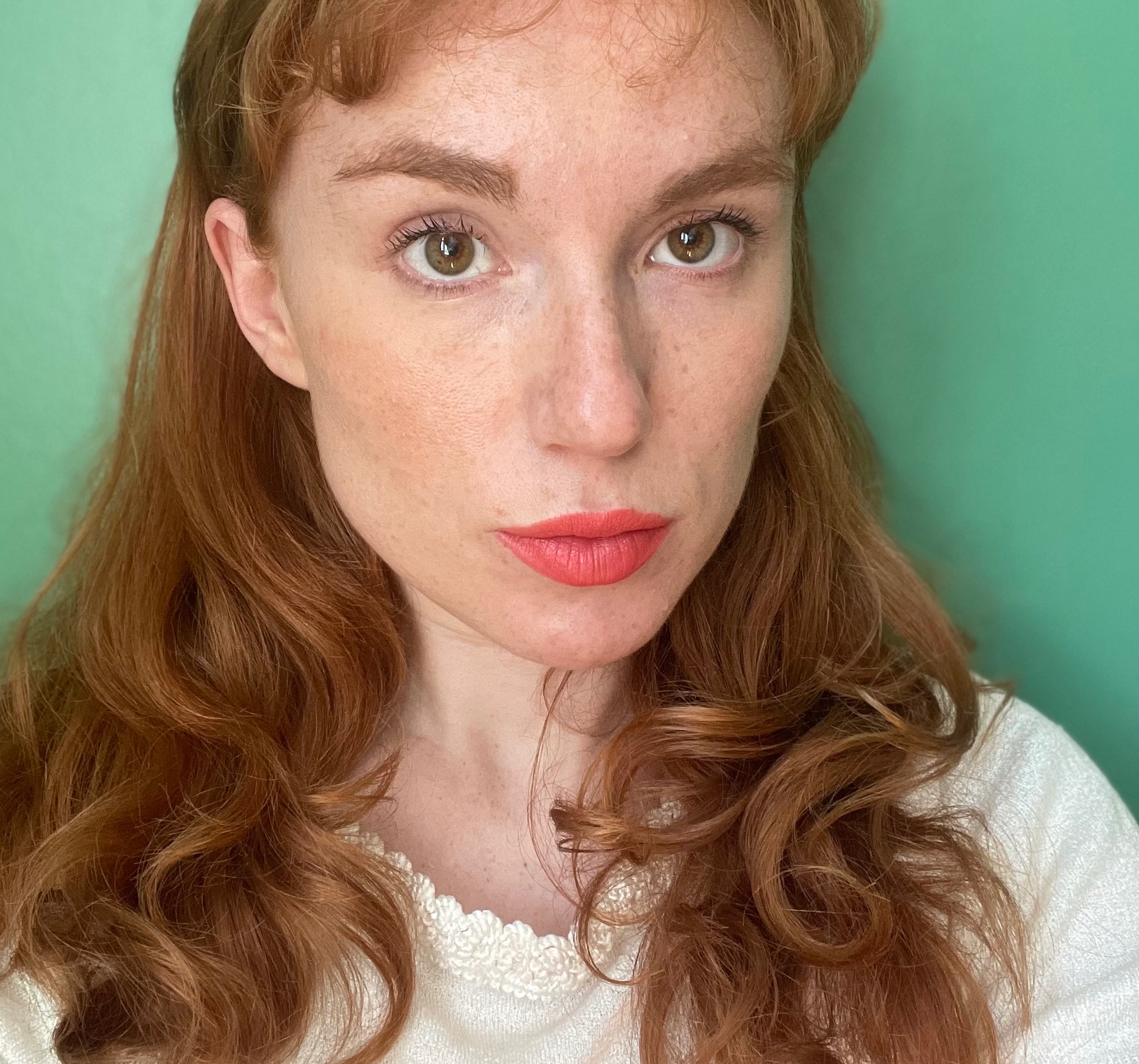
- Chaloux-Gendron in 2022
- Occupations: Poet; novelist
- Relatives: Stéphane Gendron (father)
- Writing career
- Language: French

Virginie Chaloux-Gendron is a Québécoise writer. Her poetry collection, La fabrique du noir, was a finalist for the 2023 Governor General's Award for French-language poetry.

== Career ==
Her first novel, Fais de beaux rêves, was published in 2020. Her poetry collection, Le matin recommence, was published in 2025. Her second novel, Tout cela m'appartient, a work of autofiction, was published in 2025 and explores the experience of a survivor of domestic violence navigating the legal system.

== Personal life ==
Chaloux-Gendron is the daughter of the former Mayor of Huntingdon, Quebec, Stéphane Gendron. In 2025, she stated that she completely cut ties with her father six years earlier.

She has a son.

== Works ==
=== Poetry collections ===
- Cerises de terre (2019)
- La fabrique du noir (2022)
- Le matin recommence (2025)

=== Novels ===
- Fais de beaux rêves (2020)
- Tout cela m'appartient (2025)

== Awards and nominations ==
Year	Award	Category	Work	Results	Ref.
2023	Governor General’s Awards	French-language poetry	La fabrique du noir	Nominated	
2023	Prix littéraires de la Ville de Quebec	Prix de la poésie Jean-Noël-Pontbriand (Jean-Noël-Pontbriand Poetry Prize)	La fabrique du noir	Won	
2026	Prix littéraires de la Ville de Quebec	Littérature adulte (Adult literature)	Tout cela m'appartient	Nominated	
