= Collège Jean de la Mennais =

Location
- La Prairie, Quebec; Canada; 45°24′48″N 73°28′58″W

Information
- Funding type: Private
- Motto: Latin: Veritas liberabit vos ("The truth will set you free")
- Established: 1890 (1972 as JDLM)
- Director(s): Serge Courtemanche (2005-2010); Richard Myre (2010-2021); Sylvie Dupuis (2021-Present)
- Enrollment: ~1,750
- Team name: Amiral
- Website: www.jdlm.qc.ca

Collège Jean de la Mennais is a French private mixed secondary school on the South Shore of Montreal, Québec, Canada at 870 Chemin de Saint-Jean in the municipality of La Prairie. As of 2007, the school had about 1750 elementary and high school students. Collège Jean de la Mennais was once directed by religious brothers, although today it is directed by a secular administration. The faculty is mixed between secular and religious personnel. On the school grounds there is a private cemetery which holds the graves of brothers connected to the school.

== History ==
The institution was officially founded by the Brothers of Christian Instruction in 1890, an international Christian educational organization founded in 1819 in France by two priests: Gabriel Deshayes and Jean-Marie Robert de la Mennais for the instruction of youth that has education institutions all over the world. The school was named Jean de la Mennais in 1972 in honor of de la Mennais. Other schools in many other countries including France and Japan have the same or very similar name to Jean de la Mennais. Although it only had high school beforehand, elementary grades 5 and 6 were introduced in 1999.

== Today ==
=== Environment ===
The school is equipped with classrooms, science labs, a dance studio, two sport complexes with a pool and three gyms including one synthetic grass gym.

After peaking in the early 2000s, ranking among the top 5 schools in Québec, Jean de la Mennais has seen a steady decline in provincial rankings. In the 2021-2022 L'actualité/Fraser Institute report, it dropped to 14th in Quebec, tied with Collège Sainte-Marcelline and Collège Saint-Joseph de Hull, with a score of 9.5 out of 10.

=== Admission ===
Unlike many other private schools in Québec, Jean de la Mennais doesn't necessarily take the best candidates for admission. The school admits students randomly selected from a prequalified list. All candidates are asked to pass a basic admission exam, eliminating inadequate candidates whose academic capacities don't meet the school requirements. Candidates who have or had parents or siblings at school during a certain time frame are admitted first. Other candidates will be admitted following an electronic draw.

=== Programs ===
The school offers two main secondary programs: the regular and the enriched curricula. These two programs have the exact courses from secondary one to four with the exception of Spanish as an enriched topic, replacing one or two periods of French or Mathematics for every 8-day schedule. The enriched program becomes an advanced science program in the last year with mathematics 536, physics, chemistry and advanced science topics as an extra course. In their senior year (secondary 5), students can choose optional courses to match with their interest: psychology, mathematics, physics, chemistry, theatre, and history. The school offers three levels of English: English as a Second Language (ESL), Enriched English as a Second Language (EESL) and English Language Arts (ELA).

== Extracurrriculars ==
The school provides extracurriculars for students. Students can join the JDLM Mission Musicale to learn or play an instrument. Students can participate in Amiral, JDLM's sport team. The school offers volleyball, soccer, and basketball. The school has clubs, such as an environnemental club or a public speaking club.

== Notable alumni ==
- Nicolas Girard, member of Parliament, political figure.
- Stéphane Gendron, economist and political figure, former mayor of Huntingdon, Quebec and political analyst for several media outlets
- Pierre Langlois, economist and political figure
- Denise Ho, Hong Kong singer/actress
- Simon Tian, Canadian businessman
