= Robert Nelson Walsh =

Canadian politician (1862-1938)

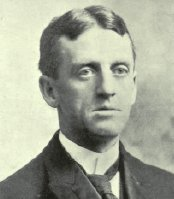

Member of the Canadian Parliament for Huntingdon
- In office 1904–1908
- Preceded by: William Scott Maclaren
- Succeeded by: James Alexander Robb

Personal details
- Born: 6 October 1864 Huntingdon, Canada East
- Died: 31 December 1938 (aged 74)
- Party: Conservative

Robert Nelson Walsh (6 October 1864 – 31 December 1938) was a Canadian politician.

Born in Huntingdon, Canada East, Walsh was educated at the Huntingdon Academy and McGill University. A veterinary surgeon, he was for twelve years a Town Councillor in Huntingdon and Mayor for six years. He has been Warden of the county and served on the School Board. He was elected to the House of Commons of Canada in the 1904 federal election for the Quebec riding of Huntingdon after being defeated in the 1900 election. A Conservative, he was defeated in 1908 and again in 1911.
