= John Clarke Moore =

Canadian politician

Member of Parliament for Châteauguay—Huntingdon
- In office July 1930 – October 1935
- Preceded by: Dennis James O'Connor
- Succeeded by: Donald Elmer Black

Personal details
- Born: John Clarke Moore; 21 September 1872 Saint-Chrysostome, Quebec
- Died: 18 May 1943 (aged 71)
- Party: Conservative
- Spouse(s): Dorothy Bell m. 17 June 1903
- Profession: physician

John Clarke Moore (21 September 1872 – 18 May 1943) was a Conservative member of the House of Commons of Canada. He was born in Saint-Chrysostome, Quebec and became a physician.

Moore attended school at Huntingdon, Quebec then studied at McGill University.

He was first elected to Parliament at the Châteauguay—Huntingdon riding in the 1930 general election. After serving his only term, the 17th Canadian Parliament, Moore was defeated by Donald Elmer Black of the Liberal party.
