= Julius Scriver =

Canadian politician

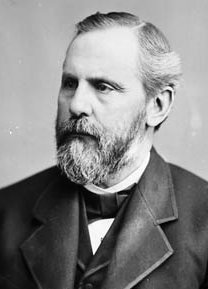

Member of the Canadian Parliament for Huntingdon
- In office 1869–1900
- Preceded by: John Rose
- Succeeded by: William Scott Maclaren

Member of the Legislative Assembly of Quebec for Huntingdon
- In office 1867–1869
- Succeeded by: William Cantwell

Personal details
- Born: February 5, 1826 Hemmingford, Quebec
- Died: September 5, 1907 (aged 81) Westmount, Quebec
- Party: Liberal

Julius Scriver (February 5, 1826 – September 5, 1907) was a politician in Quebec, Canada.

Born in Hemmingford, Lower Canada (now Quebec), the son of John Scriver and Lucretia Manning, he studied at the Workman's School in Montreal and the University of Vermont. He became a miller and tanner in Hemmingford.

In 1867, he was elected to the Legislative Assembly of Quebec representing the provincial riding of Huntingdon. In an 1869 by-election, he was acclaimed as Liberal Member of Parliament in the federal riding of Huntingdon. He was re-elected in 1872 (acclaimed), 1874, 1878 (acclaimed), 1882, 1887 (acclaimed), 1891, and 1896. He died at Westmount in 1907.
