= James Robb (politician) =

Canadian politician

The Honourable James Alexander Robb PC
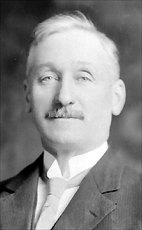

Member of the Canadian Parliament for Huntingdon
- In office 1908–1917
- Preceded by: Robert Nelson Walsh
- Succeeded by: District was abolished in 1914

Member of the Canadian Parliament for Châteauguay—Huntingdon
- In office 1917–1929
- Preceded by: District was created in 1914
- Succeeded by: Dennis James O'Connor

Personal details
- Born: 10 August 1859 Huntingdon, Canada East
- Died: 11 November 1929 (aged 70) Toronto, Ontario
- Party: Liberal

James Alexander Robb, PC (10 August 1859 – 11 November 1929) was a Canadian Member of Parliament and cabinet minister. Robb was a member of the Liberal Party of Canada.

He served as Liberal Party Whip from 1919 to 1921.

From 5 September 1925 to 28 June 1926 and again from 25 September 1926 until his death, he served as Minister of Finance in the administration of William Lyon Mackenzie King. He served briefly as Acting Minister of National Defence in October 1926.

Political offices
Preceded by Henry Herbert Stevens	Minister of Trade and Commerce; 1921–1923	Succeeded by Thomas Andrew Low
Preceded by Thomas Andrew Low	Minister of Trade and Commerce (acting); 1925–1926	Succeeded by Henry Herbert Stevens (acting)
