= John Gillies Rennie =

Canadian politician

Member of the Legislative Assembly of Quebec for Huntingdon
- In office 1947–1952
- Preceded by: Dennis James O'Connor
- Succeeded by: Henry Alister Darby Somerville

Personal details
- Born: November 14, 1904 Brooklet, Quebec
- Died: February 13, 1952 (aged 47) Montreal, Quebec
- Party: Union Nationale

John Gillies Rennie (November 14, 1904 – February 13, 1952) was a Quebec politician and educator and a member of the Legislative Assembly of Quebec from 1947 until his death in office.

He was born in Brooklet, near Hinchinbrooke, Quebec, the son of Frederick Malcolm Rennie, farmer, and Maria Carter.

He went to school in Stark School House in Godmanchester, Quebec, at Huntingdon Academy, at McGill University, and then at Bishop's College in Lennoxville, Quebec. He received a bachelor's degree in economics and political science in 1929. He took correspondence courses from Queen's University and received a diploma in the field of life insurance in 1932.

At first working as an insurance agent in the region of Huntingdon, Quebec, he was later a teacher in Frelighsburg, Quebec and in Pointe-Claire, Quebec. He was assistant director of Protestant schools in Pointe-Claire from 1930 to 1936, and principal of Valois Park School, and then of Cedar Park School. He returned to work in the field of insurance in 1936 in Montreal, where he was an agent of Manufacturer's Life Insurance.

He trained as an officer in 1940 and 1941 and became a lieutenant in the Black Watch regiment in 1942. He served at the military depot in Longueuil from 1942 to 1944, then served overseas as a staff officer from 1944 to 1946. He retired on November 23, 1946 with the rank of major.

He was elected to the Legislative Assembly of Quebec for the Union Nationale in Huntingdon in a by-election on July 23, 1947. He was re-elected in the 1948 general election. He was deputy whip for the Union Nationale from 1948 to 1952, and a member of the Protestant Board of Education from 1949 to 1951.

He died in office in 1952 at the age of 47 years 2 months. He is buried in Hillside Cemetery at Hinchinbrooke, Quebec.

John Rennie High School in Pointe-Claire is named for him.

He married Margaret Ruth Davison, daughter of Walter Cecil Davison, merchant, and Margaret Gibb, on December 28, 1940 at St. Matthew's Anglican Church, Montreal. Their only child, a daughter, Georgina Margaret Rennie (Margaret) was born September 8, 1952, seven months after her father died.
