= Sir John Rose, 1st Baronet =

Canadian politician, British financier

The Right Honourable Sir John Rose Bt PC GCMG QC
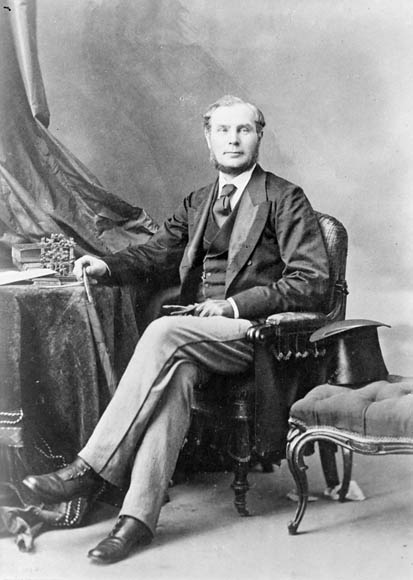

Minister of Finance
- In office 18 November 1867 – 29 September 1869
- Preceded by: Alexander Galt
- Succeeded by: Francis Hincks

Member of Parliament for Huntingdon, Quebec
- In office 20 September 1867 – 17 November 1867; 28 November 1867 – 29 September 1869
- Preceded by: New Electoral District
- Succeeded by: Julius Scriver

Solicitor General for Canada East, Province of Canada
- In office 26 November 1857 – 1 August 1858

Receiver General, Province of Canada
- In office 6 August 1858 – 7 August 1858

Solicitor General for Canada East, Province of Canada
- In office 7 August 1858 – 10 January 1859

Commissioner for Public Works, Province of Canada
- In office 11 January 1859 – 12 June 1861

Member of Legislative Assembly of the Province of Canada for City of Montreal, Canada East
- In office December 1857 - June 1861

Member of Legislative Assembly of the Province of Canada for Montreal Centre, Canada East
- In office 1861 - May, 1863; 1863 - June, 1867

Personal details
- Born: 2 August 1820 Turriff, Aberdeenshire
- Died: 24 August 1888 (aged 68) Langwell Forest, Ord of Caithness, Scotland
- Occupation: Lawyer

Sir John Rose, 1st Baronet PC GCMG QC (2 August 1820 – 24 August 1888) was a Scots-Quebecer politician. He was a member of the Legislative Assembly of the Province of Canada and the Executive Council of the Province of Canada. After Confederation, he held the offices of Solicitor General of Canada, Minister of Public Works and Minister of Finance in the new federal government. In the United Kingdom, he held the offices of Receiver General of the Duchy of Cornwall and Privy Counsellor.

In 1872, he was created 1st Baronet Rose, of Montreal. His eldest son inherited the title and in 1909, his second son, Sir Charles Day Rose, was created 1st Baronet Rose of Hardwick House in his own right. His home from 1848, Rosemount, was in Montreal's Golden Square Mile. From 1872, he lived in England at Loseley Park.

== Early life in Scotland ==
John Rose was born 2 August 1820, at Gask, near Turriff, Aberdeenshire. He was the son of William Rose (b. 1792), of Gask, and Elizabeth (d. 1822), daughter of Capt. James Fyfe. John's father, William, was a great-grandson of Hugh Rose, 16th Baron of Kilravock and Chief of Clan Rose. The estate of Gask had passed to John's father through his ancestor, Lt.-General Alexander Forbes (d. 1672), 10th Lord Forbes. John Rose was educated at Udny Academy and King's College, Aberdeen.

== Career ==
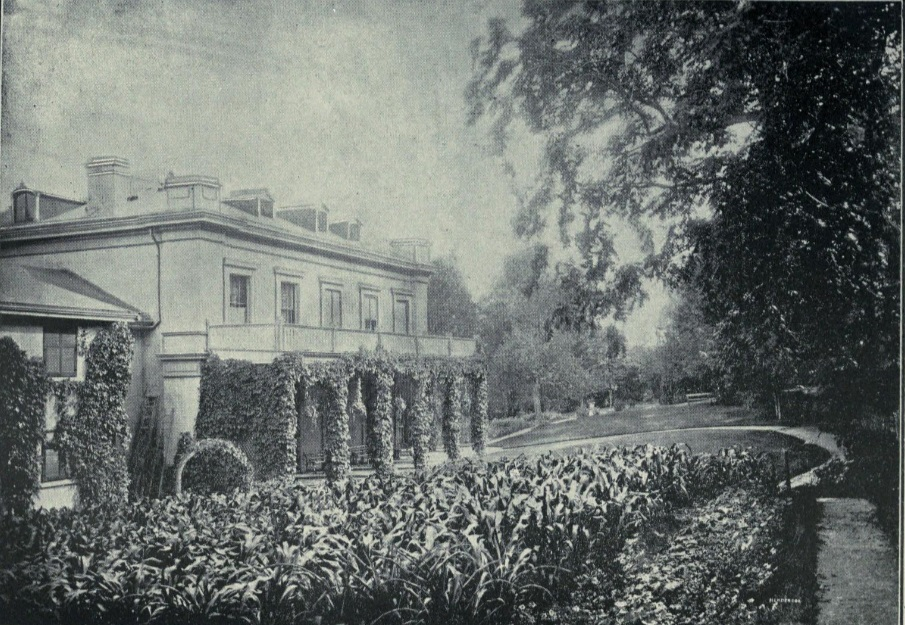
Rear view of Rosemount House in Montreal's Golden Square Mile. Built for Rose in 1848, it was his home until 1872.

In 1836, he immigrated to Huntingdon, Quebec, in what was then Lower Canada, where he was active in suppressing the Lower Canada Rebellion of 1837. He was admitted to the bar in 1842 and established a commercial practice in Montreal. From 1857 until 1867, he was a member of the Legislative Assembly of the Province of Canada, and he was a member of the Executive Council from 1858 until 1861.

He was Lower Canada's Solicitor General from 1857 to 1858 and from 1858 to 1859, and he also acted as various times as commissioner of public works and Receiver General. In 1864, the British government appointed him to the commission to settle claims under the Oregon Treaty with the United States.

Rose was elected to the House of Commons of Canada for the electoral district of Huntingdon, Quebec on 20 September 1867, and was later appointed Minister of Finance in the government of John A. Macdonald. He resigned from Parliament on 29 September 1869, to return to private life with the banking firm of Morton, Rose and Co.

Rose was a delegate to the London Conference of 1866. In 1869, Rose moved to England to practise law and acted as an unofficial representative of the Canadian government. His was one of the first missions of a partly diplomatic nature which Canada ever sent abroad. He was sent partly because his was perceived as being "gentlemanly" enough for the world of London politics. He worked for Canada's interests in trade and immigration, and lobbied for Canada's viewpoint on matter of Anglo-American relations. In this function, he answered directly to the Prime Minister, John A. Macdonald, since it was an informal position and was therefore not under the purview of the Governor General, meaning that communications could be kept secret from the Imperial Government. As well, Canada did not have a foreign affairs department at the time.

He also sat on a number of Royal Commissions in Britain and became a baronet in 1872, and a member of the Imperial Privy Council in 1886. Following his passing in 1888, Sir John Rose was interred at Mount Cemetery in Guildford, near the Loseley Park estate, which he had rented for some years.

== Family ==
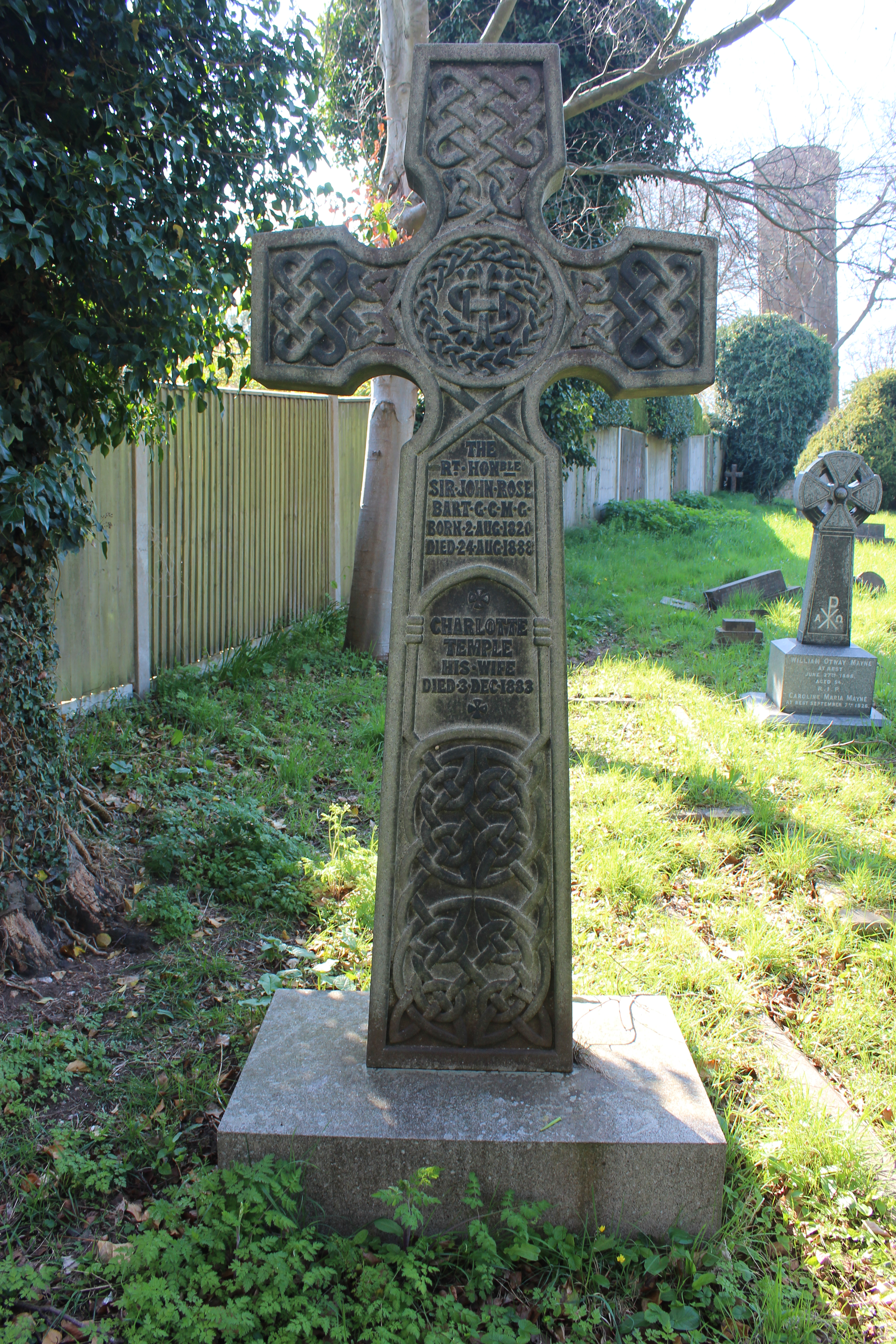
Grave at Mount Cemetery in Guildford.

He was succeeded by his elder son Sir William Rose, 2nd Baronet. His daughter Mary Rose married Major-General Sir Stanley de Astel Calvert Clarke, K.C.V.O., C.M.G.

His Clarke granddaughters, Mrs. Edith Mary Bibby and Mrs. Baird, were two of the noted beauties of the day, and their portraits by Fildes, R.A. (former) and by Shannon (latter) were exhibited at the Royal Academy, 1896.

They were the daughters of Mrs. Edith Mary Bibby married Frank Bibby, of Sansaw, near Shrewsbury, England, 1890, and the couple had two sons and two daughters.

== Arms ==
Coat of arms of Sir John Rose, 1st Baronet
Crest A harp Or stringed Argent. Escutcheon Or a boar's head couped Gules between three water bougets Sable on a chief of the second as many maple leaves of the first. Motto Audeo, Constant and True

Parliament of Canada
New district	Member of Parliament from Huntingdon; 1867–1869	Succeeded by Julius Scriver
Political offices
Preceded by Alexander Galt	Minister of Finance; 1867–1869	Succeeded by Francis Hincks
Baronetage of the United Kingdom
New creation	Baronet (of Montreal); 1872–1888	Succeeded by William Rose
