= Beauharnois-Huntingdon =

Coordinates: 45.184°N 73.974°W

Quebec electoral district

Defunct provincial electoral district
- Legislature: National Assembly of Quebec
- District created: 1988
- District abolished: 2001
- First contested: 1989
- Last contested: 1998

Beauharnois-Huntingdon was a former provincial electoral district in the Montérégie region of Quebec, Canada that elected members to the National Assembly of Quebec. It was located in and around the area between Beauharnois, Quebec and Huntingdon, Quebec.

It was created for the 1989 election, from the existing Beauharnois and Huntingdon districts, which ceased to exist. Its final election was in 1998. In the 2003 election it disappeared and Beauharnois and Huntingdon districts were recreated.

== Members of the National Assembly ==
Legislature	Years	Member	Party
Riding created from Beauharnois and Huntingdon
34th	1989–1994	André Chenail	Liberal
35th	1994–1998	André Chenail	Liberal
36th	1998–2003	André Chenail	Liberal
Dissolved into Beauharnois and Huntingdon
