= Claude Dubois (politician) =

Canadian politician

Member of the National Assembly of Quebec for Huntingdon
- In office 1976–1989
- Preceded by: Kenneth Fraser
- Succeeded by: District abolished in 1989

Personal details
- Born: October 11, 1931 (age 94) Saint-Michel, Quebec
- Party: Union Nationale; Liberal

Claude Dubois (born October 11, 1931) is a former politician in Quebec, Canada.

== Background ==
He was born on October 11, 1931, in Saint-Michel, Quebec, and was a business person.

== Mayor ==
Dubois served as Mayor of Saint-Rémi, Quebec, from 1972 to 1976.

== Political career ==
Dubois was elected as a Union Nationale candidate to the provincial legislature in the district of Huntingdon with 42% of the vote in 1976, against Liberal incumbent Kenneth Fraser.

He crossed the floor in 1979 and joined the Liberals. He was re-elected in 1981 and 1985, but he did not run for re-election in 1989.

He was succeeded by André Chenail.
