= Frédéric Laplante =

Quebec politician and teacher

Frédéric Laplante MNA

Member of the National Assembly for Huntingdon
- Incumbent
- Assumed office October 5, 2026
- Preceded by: Carole Mallette

Personal details
- Party: Parti Québécois
- Education: Cégep de Saint-Jean-sur-Richelieu; McGill University; Concordia University; Université de Montréal (B.Ed.)
- Occupation: High school teacher, politician

Frédéric Laplante is a Canadian politician and high school teacher who has represented Huntingdon in the National Assembly of Quebec since 2026 as a member of the Parti Québécois (PQ).

== Early life and education ==
Laplante attended Cégep de Saint-Jean-sur-Richelieu before pursuing higher education in Montreal. He studied languages and literature at McGill University and later completed a certificate in arts and sciences at Concordia University, where he also played U Sports college football as a defensive lineman for the Concordia Stingers.

He earned a bachelor's degree in secondary French education (enseignement du français au secondaire) from the Université de Montréal in 2023. Prior to and during his campaign, he worked as a high school French teacher, continuing to teach full-time throughout the electoral race.

== Political career ==
In the 2026 Quebec general election, Laplante ran as the Parti Québécois candidate in the riding of Huntingdon.

=== Political context and historical voting trends ===
Historically competitive between the Quebec Liberal Party (PLQ) and the Coalition Avenir Québec (CAQ), Huntingdon underwent significant shifts leading up to the 2026 election, influenced by boundary redistricting and changing voter alignments. Transposed historical projections for the riding illustrate the shifting political landscape across recent cycles:

- 2014: PLQ lead with 47.8%, followed by CAQ (24.0%) and PQ (20.8%).
- 2018: CAQ lead with 37.6%, followed by PLQ (34.2%) and PQ (12.2%).
- 2022: CAQ maintained dominance with 46.8%, while the Conservative Party of Quebec (PCQ) surged to 13.4%, narrowly ahead of the PLQ (14.0%) and PQ (12.3%).

During the 2026 campaign, the protection and promotion of the French language played a central role in local debate. Laplante won the riding with 10,137 votes, defeating Liberal candidate Connor Stacey (8,491 votes) and Conservative candidate Chantal Dauphinais (8,490 votes). His election was considered a major surprise, marking the first time a candidate from the Parti Québécois was elected to represent the riding of Huntingdon.

== Electoral record ==
2026 Quebec general election: Huntingdon
Party	Candidate	Votes	%
Parti Québécois	Frédéric Laplante	10,137	32.2
Quebec Liberal Party	Connor Stacey	8,491	27.0
Conservative Party of Quebec	Chantal Dauphinais	8,490	27.0
Coalition Avenir Québec	Stéphane Bisaillon	4,033	12.8
Total valid votes		31,151	100.0
Turnout		67.2%	
