= Neptune Pine =

Smartwatch developed by Neptune

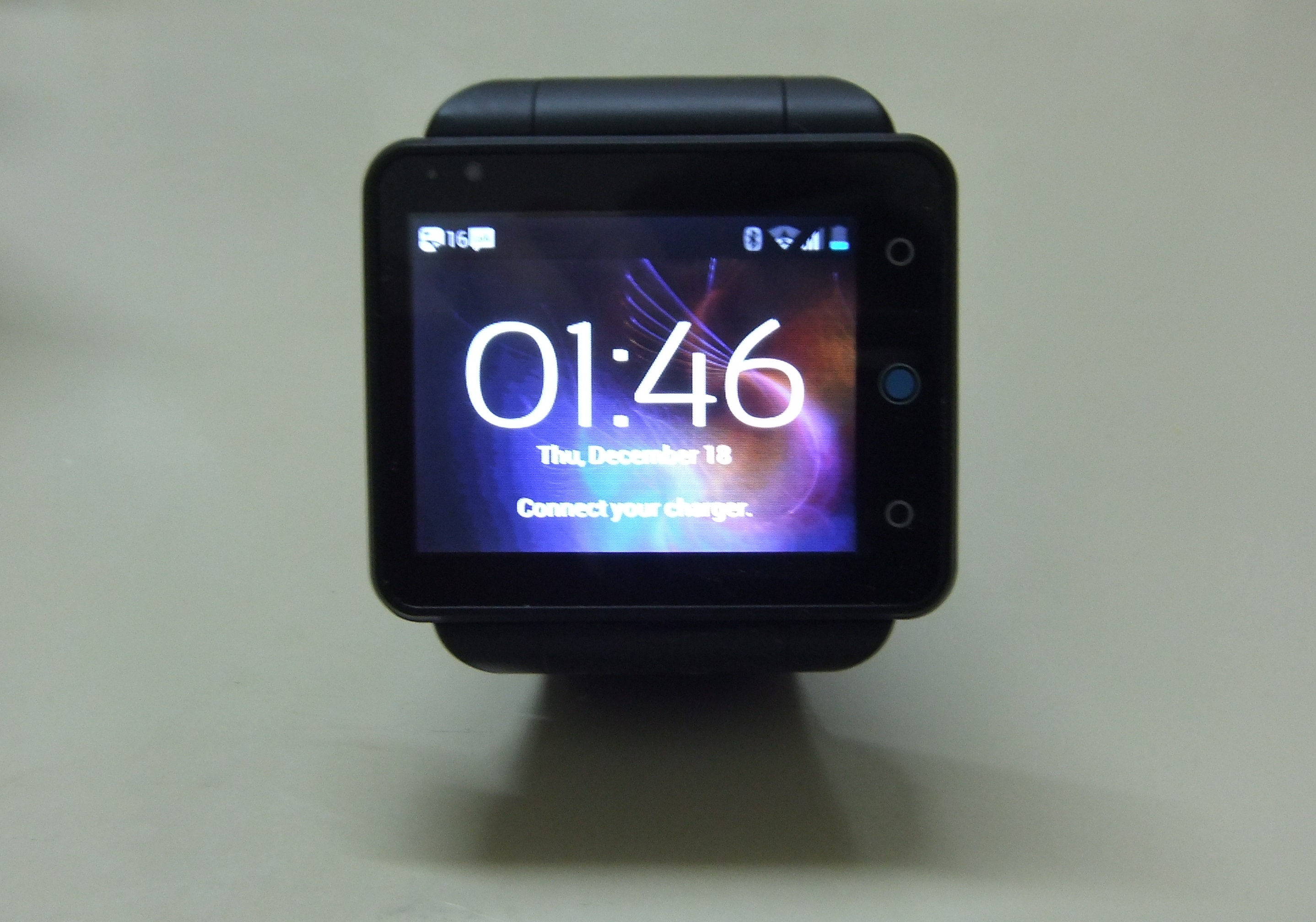
- Type: Standalone smartwatch
- Availability by region: January, 2014
- Compatible networks: GSM/GPRS/EDGE 850, 900, 1800, 1900, UMTS/HSPA+/WCDMA 850, 1700, 1900, 2100
- Dimensions: 66.0 mm × 53.5 mm × 14.2 mm (2.60 in × 2.11 in × 0.56 in)
- Weight: 60.8 g (2.14 oz)
- Operating system: Android 4.1 Jelly Bean
- CPU: Qualcomm Snapdragon S4 Play MSM8225 (1.2GHz Dual- Core ARM Cortex-A5)
- Memory: 512MB RAM
- Removable storage: internal, non removable 16 or 32GB mass storage
- Battery: 810 mAh lithium-ion battery Charging via USB to computer system or power adapter
- Rear camera: 5.0 MP rear-facing camera, VGA front-facing camera, LED flash (Front & Rear)
- Display: 2.4" inch, TFT
- Connectivity: Wi-Fi 802.11 b/g/n, Bluetooth 4.0 (voice, stereo), USB 2.0, Micro-SIM
- Data inputs: Capacitive Touchscreen

The Neptune Pine is an unlocked GSM standalone, full featured smartwatch developed by Canadian consumer electronics and wearable technology company Neptune. It was announced in January 2013 by Simon Tian and launched in November 2013 on Kickstarter. Within 27 hours, the campaign had reached its funding goal of $100,000, and ultimately went on to raise more than $800,000 in 30 days, becoming the highest-funded Canadian Kickstarter campaign at the time.

The device started shipping in August 2014, and eventually became widely available through Best Buy and Amazon. It was featured in the 2017 film The Fate of the Furious, the CBS TV series Extant starring Halle Berry and the music video for Smartphones by Trey Songz. The Pine received mixed reviews from the press, generally praising its extensive set of features, while criticizing its large size.

== Funding ==
After a successful campaign on Kickstarter Neptune managed to raise over $800,000 out of a goal of $100,000.

== Features ==
It uses Google Android version 4.1 but is not a Google-licensed device and therefore does not include Google apps or the Google Play store. These apps can be manually added by the user.

The Pine has a Snapdragon S4 system on a chip (SoC) by Qualcomm that has a Cortex-A5 Dual-Core ARM processor running at 1.2 GHz.

The smartwatch has a capacitive touch screen, a Wi-Fi web browser, a 5.0 MP rear-facing camera and a VGA front-facing camera, both of them with LED flash, a multimedia player and recorder for music (mp3) and video (mp4), a 3.5 mm headphone jack and an internal GPS antenna that supports satellite navigation. Other data inputs are an accelerometer, a gyroscope, a pedometer, and a digital compass.

The Pine smartwatch can be released from the wrist strap by pressing a button on the strap for a better audio signal during a phone call or to take photos with the 5 MP rear-facing camera which is otherwise blocked by the strap.

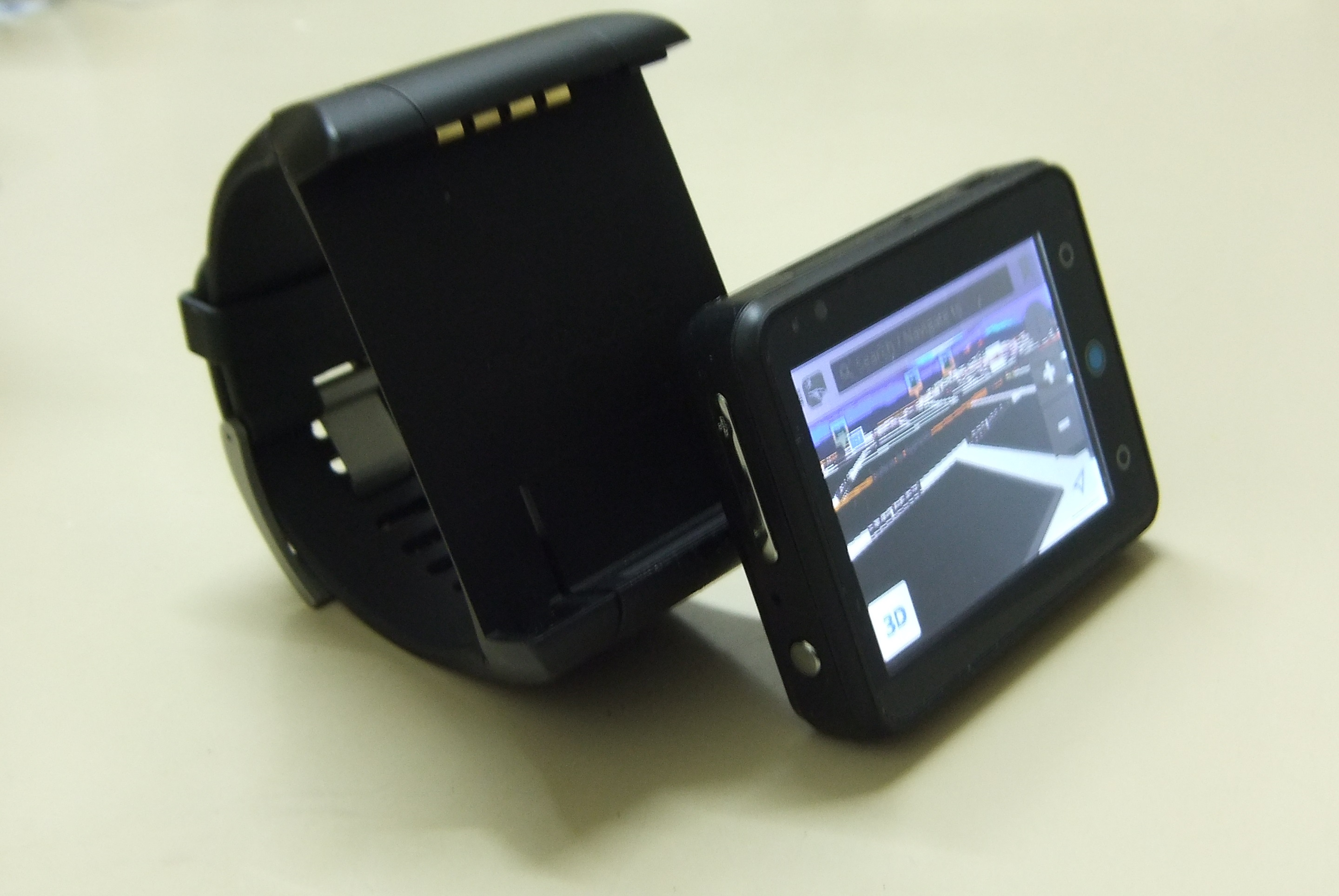
Pine detached from wrist band

A Micro B USB to USB cable is required to charge the smartwatch. It can also connect to a computer so that the internal SD card can be recognized as a mass storage device for file management.

As a phone, it can be used in conjunction with a Bluetooth headset and can operate in a hands-free manner with its built-in microphone and speakers, also its Bluetooth functionality supports Stereo Bluetooth for wireless music playback and making calls. It offers a talk time of up to 8 hours on 2G and six hours on 3G. Internet usage time is up to seven hours and music playback is up to 10 hours.

The watch was initially designed to be waterproof, but it was found that the manufacturer was unable to apply the desired treatment. While this option is not available at retail, Kickstarter backers who wanted waterproofing could have their products transported to a third party, opened, and treated with the aftermarket HzO spray before delivery.
