= André Chenail =

Canadian politician and farmer

Mayor of Sainte-Clotilde
- In office 2017–2020
- Preceded by: Clément Lemieux
- Succeeded by: Guy-Julien Mayné
- In office 1982–1989
- Preceded by: Robert Lefort
- Succeeded by: Mario Moïse

Member of the National Assembly of Quebec for Huntingdon
- In office April 14, 2003 – March 26, 2007
- Preceded by: Riding created
- Succeeded by: Albert De Martin

Member of the National Assembly of Quebec for Beauharnois-Huntingdon
- In office September 25, 1989 – April 14, 2003
- Preceded by: Riding created
- Succeeded by: Riding dissolved

Personal details
- Born: July 12, 1946 (age 80) Sainte-Clotilde, Quebec, Canada
- Party: Liberal

André Chenail (born July 12, 1946) is a farmer and former political figure in Quebec. He represented Beauharnois-Huntingdon from 1989 to 2003 and Huntingdon in the National Assembly of Quebec from 2003 to 2007 as a Liberal.

He was born to Fridolin Chenail and Évelina Catman in Sainte-Clotilde, Quebec. Chenail was educated at Sainte-Marguerite-du-Lac-Masson, the Collège de Laprairie, and Saint-Rémi. He was president and founder of Fermes du Soleil, which specialized in the production and distribution of vegetables. He was later president of Terres du Soleil, a company involved in real estate promotion. Chenail was a member of the municipal council for Sainte-Clotilde from 1973 to 1975, from 1976 to 1980, and mayor from 1982 to 1989. He was prefect for the regional municipality of Jardins-de-Napierville in 1987 and 1988. Chenail was elected in the 2003 election but was defeated by Albert De Martin of the ADQ when he ran for reelection in 2007.

== See also ==
- Politics of Quebec
