= Merrill Edwin Barrington =

Canadian politician (1920–1965)

Member of the Canadian Parliament for Châteauguay—Huntingdon—Laprairie
- In office 1958–1962
- Preceded by: Jean Boucher
- Succeeded by: Jean Boucher

Personal details
- Born: 25 February 1920 Ormstown, Quebec, Canada
- Died: 18 December 1965 (aged 45) Ormstown, Quebec, Canada
- Party: Progressive Conservative
- Occupation: accountant, insurance broker

Merrill Edwin Barrington (25 February 1920 – 18 December 1965) was a Canadian politician, accountant and insurance broker. He was elected to the House of Commons of Canada in 1958 as a Member of the Progressive Conservative Party for the riding of Châteauguay—Huntingdon—Laprairie. He was defeated in the elections of 1953, 1957 and 1962.
