= William Cantwell =

Canadian politician

Member of the Legislative Assembly of Quebec for Huntingdon
- In office 1869–1871
- Preceded by: Julius Scriver
- Succeeded by: Thomas Sanders

Personal details
- Born: April 24, 1804 Troy, New York
- Died: November 20, 1886 (aged 82) Franklin, Quebec
- Party: Conservative

William Cantwell (April 24, 1804 – November 20, 1886) was a merchant, land owner and political figure in Quebec. He represented Huntingdon in the Legislative Assembly of Quebec from 1869 to 1872 as a Conservative member.

He was born in Troy, New York and was educated there. In 1829, he married Jane Ann Wilson. Cantwell was mayor of Franklin and was warden for Huntingdon County from 1858 to 1860. Cantwell was elected to the Quebec assembly in an 1869 by-election held after Julius Scriver resigned his seat to run for a federal seat. He died at Franklin at the age of 82.
