= Dennis James O'Connor =

Canadian politician

Member of the Canadian Parliament for Châteauguay—Huntingdon
- In office January 27, 1930 – July 28, 1930
- Preceded by: James Robb
- Succeeded by: John Clarke Moore

Member of the Legislative Assembly of Quebec for Huntingdon
- In office 1941–1946
- Preceded by: James Walker Ross
- Succeeded by: John Gillies Rennie

Personal details
- Born: January 27, 1880 Godmanchester, Quebec, Canada
- Died: November 26, 1946 (aged 66) Huntingdon, Quebec, Canada
- Party: Liberal

Dennis James O'Connor (January 27, 1880 – November 26, 1946) was a Quebec politician.

An Irish Quebecer, O'Connor was born in Godmanchester, Quebec to farmer Andrew O'Connor and his wife, Mary Walsh. He studied agriculture at Macdonald College and engineering through International Correspondence Schools.

O'Connor worked as a farmer and was also involved with O'Connor Brothers, his family's road construction firm, and owned and operated a garage. He became president of the chamber of commerce in Huntingdon, Quebec and served as an alderman on the town council from 1917 to 1922 and as mayor of Huntingdon from 1922 to 1931. He then served as chairman of the school board from 1937 to 1946.

O'Connor was elected to the House of Commons of Canada by acclamation as the Liberal MP for Châteauguay—Huntingdon in a January 27, 1930 by-election but lost the seat in the 1930 federal election, held six months later, losing by fewer than 500 votes to Conservative John Clarke Moore.

He was elected to the Legislative Assembly of Quebec as the Quebec Liberal Party MLA for Huntingdon in a 1941 by-election and was re-elected in 1944 provincial election. O'Connor died in office in 1946 at the age of 66.
