= Simon Tian =

Canadian entrepreneur

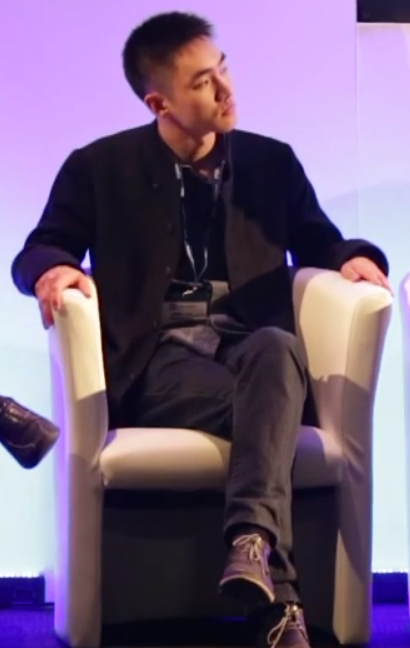
- Tian as a guest speaker at the Wearable Technology Show in London, 2014
- Born: February 24, 1994 (age 32); Montreal, Quebec, Canada
- Education: Marianopolis College (attended)
- Occupation: CEO of Fonus
- Awards: 2015 Thiel Fellowship; Top 30 Under 30 (Les Affaires)

Simon Tian (born February 24, 1994) is a Canadian businessman, inventor, entrepreneur and investor. He is the founder and chief executive officer (CEO) of Fonus and Neptune. Born and raised in Montreal, Canada, Tian dropped out of pre-university college at the age of 17 to start Neptune, and, as of late 2017, has raised around $7 million from private investors as well as a total of more than $2 million from crowdfunding sources alone. Tian is a 2015 Thiel Fellow, having been awarded $100,000 by PayPal co-founder and venture capitalist Peter Thiel through the Thiel Foundation, and was named one of the top 30 Quebecers under 30 by Les Affaires in 2014.

== Early life ==
Tian was born to Chinese Canadian parents in Montreal, Quebec, in 1994. He was raised in Brossard, Quebec, a suburb of Montreal, and attended secondary school at Jean de la Mennais College, a French-speaking school in La Prairie, Quebec. Tian is fluent in English, French, and Mandarin. Tian is also a classically-trained pianist, having won first place in piano performance at the Canadian Music Competition twice, in 2004 and 2008, at ages nine and 13.

== Career ==
Tian started Neptune, a wearable technology company, in January 2013, while he was 17 and studying at Marianopolis College, in Westmount, Quebec. Before building a prototype or incorporating the company, Tian posted some conceptual drawings of a smartwatch, the Neptune Pine, on the internet and issued a press release announcing the product's launch. He received more than 20,000 orders for the device in a few weeks. Following the interest in his conceptual drawings, Tian dropped out of school and travelled to China to meet with manufacturers to have the device developed. In November 2013, he launched a crowdfunding campaign to finance the product's development. Within 27 hours, the campaign surpassed its funding goal of $100,000, and went on to raise more than $800,000 in 30 days.

The Pine was prominently featured in the 2017 film The Fate of the Furious, the CBS TV series Extant produced by Steven Spielberg and starring Halle Berry, as well as the music video for the song Smartphones by Trey Songz. The device received mixed reviews from the press (Gizmodo, Engadget), with many criticizing its large size and functionality.

In November 2015, Tian was invited by the Mayor of Montreal Denis Coderre to attend the 2015 Montreal Trade mission to China as one of the city's representatives. Tian raised US$1.15 million for the Neptune Suite concept in 2015, estimating it would be ready for production in April 2016. In late 2017, Neptune, Tian's first company, was acquired for an undisclosed amount.

In November 2019, Tian announced the launch of Fonus, an American telecommunications company based in Santa Monica, California, operating as a mobile virtual network operator on AT&T’s network. The company initially launched a single monthly prepaid plan, providing users with up to 5G speeds of unlimited data, unlimited calls and texts to over 50 countries worldwide, and free roaming in the United States, Canada and Mexico. The data operates on AT&T's cellular network in the United States, whereas the calls and texts are provided through Fonus' proprietary voice over IP (VoIP) application.

In late 2023, Tian unveiled global wireless plans on Fonus in over 50 countries.

In May 2024, Tian announced a strategic partnership between Fonus and Tata Communications, leveraging Tata’s proprietary platform to expand and streamline Fonus’ wireless coverage worldwide.

In March 2025, Tian launched wireless plans on Fonus with expanded coverage in over 100 countries worldwide, up from 55 countries previously. 5G support is available in over 90% of the countries covered.
