= Fonus Mobile =

American mobile virtual network operator

Fonus Inc.
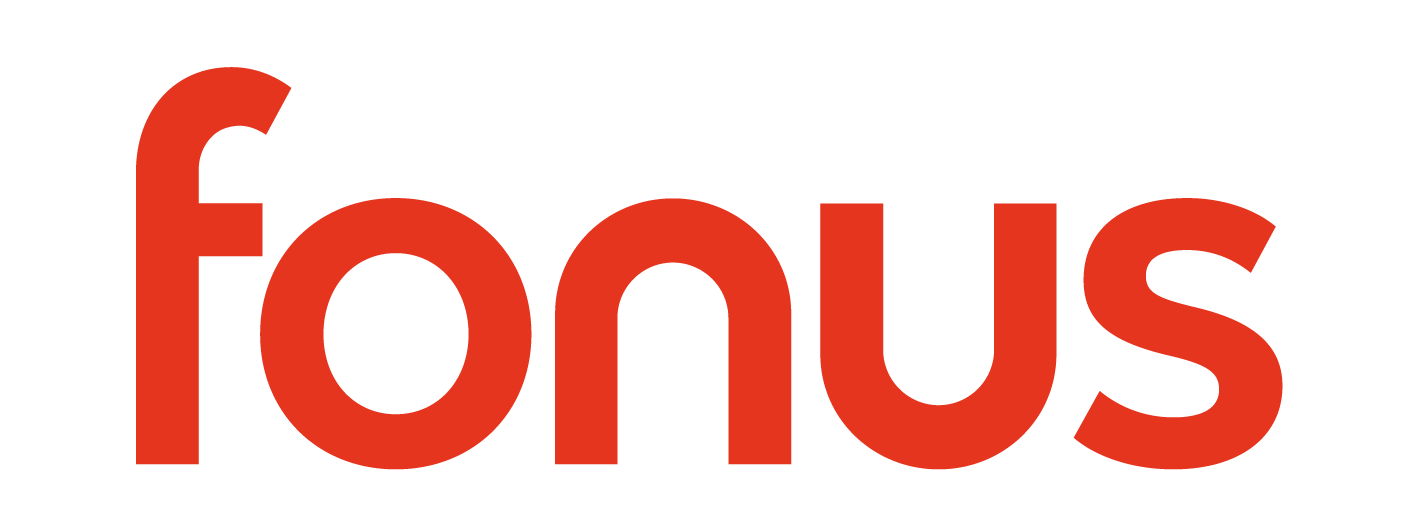
- Type: Private
- Industry: Telecommunications
- Founded: 2019; 7 years ago
- Founder: Simon Tian
- Headquarters: Santa Monica, California, United States
- Key people: Simon Tian (CEO)
- Website: www.fonusmobile.com

Fonus Inc., doing business as Fonus and Fonus Mobile, is an American mobile virtual network operator founded in 2019 by Canadian entrepreneur Simon Tian and based in Santa Monica, California.

== History ==
Fonus was founded by Simon Tian in 2019 and is based in Santa Monica, California. The company initially launched a single monthly prepaid plan, in the United States, Canada and Mexico at $30 per month. The data operates on AT&T's cellular network in the United States and affiliate networks in Canada and Mexico, whereas the calls and texts are provided through Fonus' proprietary voice over IP (VoIP) application. As of April 2021, Fonus is one of the top 10 best-rated mobile network operators worldwide on Trustpilot.

In late 2023, Fonus announced the launch of global wireless plans with unlimited data, calls & texts in over 50 countries, starting at US$19.99 per month. The plans provide 5G speeds worldwide and are available in physical SIM and eSIM formats. Mobile hotspotting, visual voicemail, and Wi-Fi Calling are also supported.

In May 2024, Fonus announced a strategic partnership with Tata Communications, leveraging Tata’s proprietary platform to expand and streamline Fonus’ wireless coverage worldwide.

In March 2025, Fonus launched new wireless plans with expanded coverage in over 100 countries, up from 55 countries previously. Additionally, 5G support is now available in more than 90% of the countries covered. Unlike traditional carriers which impose time restrictions on international roaming - such as suspending service after extended periods abroad - Fonus does not enforce any such time limits on overseas usage. Users may use the service continuously in any supported country or destination, with no restrictions on duration of use.
