= Châteauguay—Huntingdon—Laprairie =

Former federal electoral district in Quebec, Canada

Quebec electoral district

Defunct federal electoral district
- Legislature: House of Commons
- District created: 1947
- District abolished: 1966
- First contested: 1949
- Last contested: 1965

Châteauguay—Huntingdon—Laprairie was a federal electoral district in Quebec, Canada, that was represented in the House of Commons of Canada from 1949 to 1968.

== History ==
This riding was created in 1947, from parts of Beauharnois—Laprairie and Châteauguay—Huntingdon ridings.

It consisted of:

- the county of Châteauguay, except the municipality of St-Joachim-de-Châteauguay;
- the county of Huntingdon, (except the municipalities of St. Anicet and Ste. Barbe), and the town of Huntingdon;
- the county of Laprairie (except the municipality of St-Jacques-le-Mineur), and the town of Laprairie; and
- in the county of St. Jean, the municipalities of Notre-Dame-du-Mont-Carmel, St-Bernard-de-Lacolle and the village of Lacolle.

It was abolished in 1966, when it was redistributed into Beauharnois, Chambly, Laprairie and Saint-Jean ridings.

== Members of Parliament ==
This riding elected the following members of Parliament:

Parliament	Years	Member	Party
Châteauguay—Huntingdon—Laprairie; Riding created from Beauharnois—Laprairie and Châteauguay—Huntingdon
21st	1949–1953	Donald Elmer Black	Liberal
22nd	1953–1957	Jean Boucher	Liberal
23rd	1957–1958	Jean Boucher	Liberal
24th	1958–1962	Merrill Edwin Barrington	Progressive Conservative
25th	1962–1963	Jean Boucher	Liberal
26th	1963–1965	Ian Watson	Liberal
27th	1965–1968	Ian Watson	Liberal
Riding dissolved into Beauharnois, Chambly, Laprairie and Saint-Jean

== Election results ==
1949 Canadian federal election
Party	Candidate	Votes
Liberal	Donald Elmer Black	9,986
Progressive Conservative	Joseph-Siméon Beaudin	7,028

1953 Canadian federal election
Party	Candidate	Votes
Liberal	Jean Boucher	11,104
Progressive Conservative	Merrill Edwin Barrington	7,003

1957 Canadian federal election
Party	Candidate	Votes
Liberal	Jean Boucher	10,066
Progressive Conservative	Merrill Edwin Barrington	6,907
Independent Liberal	David Cote	2,346

1958 Canadian federal election
Party	Candidate	Votes
Progressive Conservative	Merrill Edwin Barrington	12,365
Liberal	Jean Boucher	6,472

1962 Canadian federal election
Party	Candidate	Votes
Liberal	Jean Boucher	10,305
Progressive Conservative	Merrill Edwin Barrington	9,260
Social Credit	Bernard Dupuis	2,398

1963 Canadian federal election
Party	Candidate	Votes
Liberal	Ian Watson	10,746
Progressive Conservative	Raymond-J. Beriault	6,926
Social Credit	Gaston Boileau	4,039
New Democratic	Jean-Guy Tremblay	1,226

1965 Canadian federal election
Party	Candidate	Votes
Liberal	Ian Watson	14,222
Progressive Conservative	Robert James Clarke	4,659
New Democratic	Jean-Guy Tremblay	2,369
Ralliement créditiste	Marcellin Gagnon	1,052
Independent PC	Roland De Montigny	520

== See also ==
- List of Canadian electoral districts
- Historical federal electoral districts of Canada
