= Châteauguay—Huntingdon =

Former federal electoral district in Quebec, Canada

Quebec electoral district

Defunct federal electoral district
- Legislature: House of Commons
- District created: 1914
- District abolished: 1947
- First contested: 1917
- Last contested: 1945

Châteauguay—Huntingdon was a federal electoral district in Quebec, Canada, that was represented in the House of Commons of Canada from 1917 to 1949.

== History ==
This riding was created in 1914 from Châteauguay and Huntingdon ridings.

It initially consisted of the Counties of Châteauguay and Huntingdon.

In 1933, it was redefined to consist of:

- the county of Châteauguay except the municipalities of Ste-Philomène, St-Joachim, and the towns of De Léry and of Châteauguay;
- the county of Huntingdon except the municipality of Ste-Barbe;
- in the county of Beauharnois, the municipality of St-Etienne; and
- in the county of St. Johns, the municipalities of St-Bernard-de-Lacolle, Notre-Dame-du-Mont-Carmel and the village of Lacolle.

It was abolished in 1947 when it was merged into Châteauguay—Huntingdon—Laprairie.

== Members of Parliament ==
This riding elected the following members of Parliament:

Parliament	Years	Member	Party
Châteauguay—Huntingdon; Riding created from Châteauguay and Huntingdon
13th	1917–1921	James Robb	Opposition (Laurier Liberals)
14th	1921–1921	James Robb	Liberal
14th	1922–1925	James Robb	Liberal
15th	1925–1926	James Robb	Liberal
16th	1926–1926	James Robb	Liberal
16th	1926–1929	James Robb	Liberal
16th	1930–1930	Dennis James O'Connor	Liberal
17th	1930–1935	John Clarke Moore	Conservative
18th	1935–1940	Donald Elmer Black	Liberal
19th	1940–1945	Donald Elmer Black	Liberal
20th	1945–1949	Donald Elmer Black	Liberal
Riding dissolved into Châteauguay—Huntingdon—Laprairie

== Election results ==
1917 Canadian federal election
Party	Candidate	Votes
Opposition (Laurier Liberals)	James Robb	3,835
Government (Unionist)	James Morris	1,990
Unknown	Joseph Omer Dubois	40

1921 Canadian federal election
Party	Candidate	Votes
Liberal	James Robb	5,915
Labour	Peter Daniel McArthur	4,061
Progressive	Joseph Begin	548

By-election: On Mr. Robb accepting an office of emolument under the Crown, 29 December 1921

By-election on 19 January 1922
Party	Candidate	Votes
Liberal	James Robb	acclaimed

1925 Canadian federal election
Party	Candidate	Votes
Liberal	James Robb	5,270
Conservative	John Alexander Sullivan	4,058

1926 Canadian federal election
Party	Candidate	Votes
Liberal	James Robb	5,691
Conservative	John Alexander Sullivan	4,971

By-election: On Mr. Robb accepting an office of emolument under the Crown, 5 October 1926

By-election on 2 November 1926
Party	Candidate	Votes
Liberal	James Robb	acclaimed

By-election: On Mr. Robb's death, 11 November 1929

By-election on 27 January 1930
Party	Candidate	Votes
Liberal	Dennis James O'Connor	acclaimed

1930 Canadian federal election
Party	Candidate	Votes
Conservative	John Clarke Moore	5,934
Liberal	Dennis James O'Connor	5,445

1935 Canadian federal election
Party	Candidate	Votes
Liberal	Donald Elmer Black	6,101
Conservative	John Clarke Moore	4,947

1940 Canadian federal election
Party	Candidate	Votes
Liberal	Donald Elmer Black	5,773
National Government	James Albert Robinson	2,047

1945 Canadian federal election
Party	Candidate	Votes
Liberal	Donald Elmer Black	4,770
Independent	Henri Turcot	3,075
Progressive Conservative	Peter Daniel McArthur	2,804
Independent	Lorenzo Lebel	662
Social Credit	Ovila Bourdon	101

== See also ==
- List of Canadian electoral districts
- Historical federal electoral districts of Canada
