= Thomas Sanders (Quebec politician) =

Canadian politician

Member of the Legislative Assembly of Quebec for Huntingdon
- In office 1871–1874
- Preceded by: William Cantwell
- Succeeded by: Alexander Cameron

Personal details
- Born: July 4, 1836 Havelock, Lower Canada
- Died: March 21, 1874 (aged 37) Havelock, Quebec
- Party: Conservative
- Spouse: Andrian McNaughton

Thomas Sanders (July 4, 1836 – March 21, 1874) was a Canadian merchant and political figure in Quebec. He represented Huntingdon in the Legislative Assembly of Quebec from 1871 to 1874 as a Conservative.

He was born in Covey Hill, Lower Canada and was educated there. Sanders was a captain in the local militia. In 1868, he married Andrian McNaughton. He served as mayor of Havelock. Sanders died in office at Havelock at the age of 37.
