= Neptune (company) =

Canadian consumer electronics company

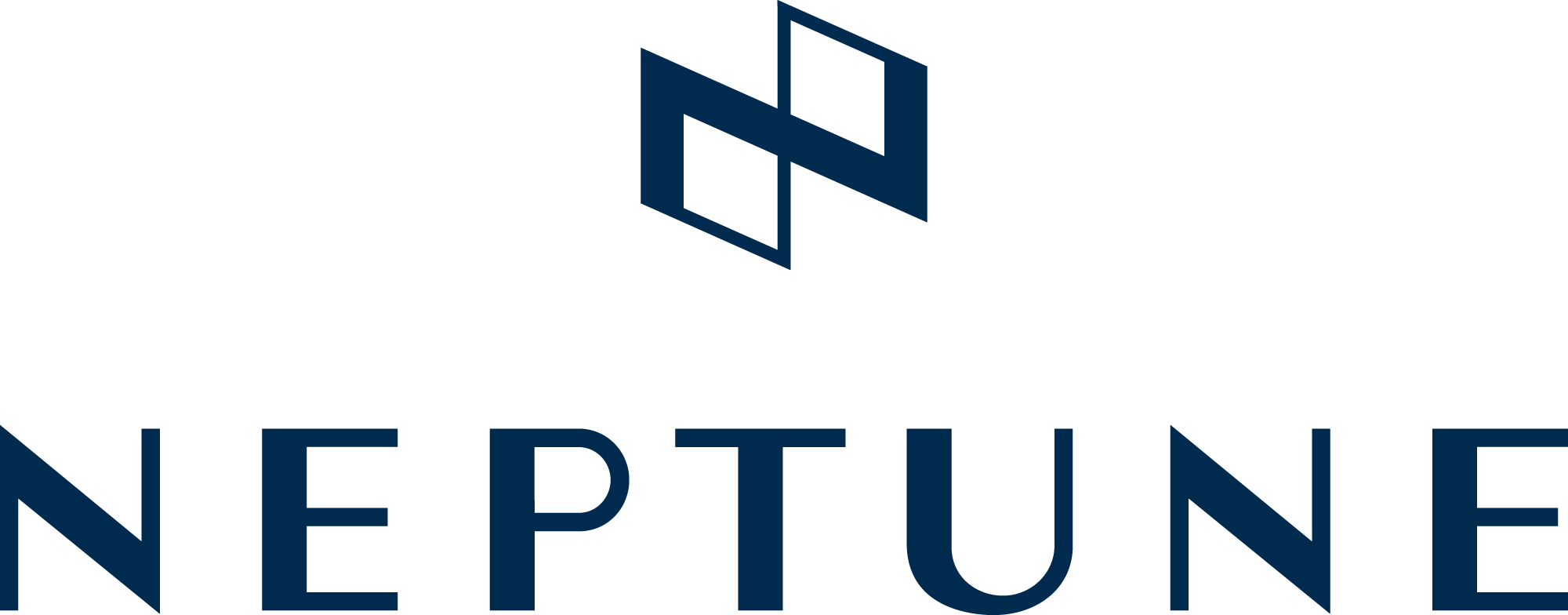
- Type: Private
- Industry: Consumer electronics
- Founded: January 23, 2013
- Founder: Simon Tian
- Fate: Acquired in 2017
- Headquarters: Toronto, Ontario, Canada
- Key people: Simon Tian (CEO)
- Products: Neptune Pine, Neptune Suite (concept),

Neptune Computer Inc., commonly known as Neptune, was a Canadian privately held consumer electronics and wearable technology company, founded in 2013 by Simon Tian in Montreal, Quebec, and based in Toronto. The company has raised around $7 million from private investors, and over $2 million from crowdfunding sources like Kickstarter and Indiegogo.

Neptune's first product, the Neptune Pine, was first announced in 2013 through a Kickstarter campaign, raising more than $800,000 in 30 days, before releasing in 2014. The company later announced the Neptune Suite concept in 2015. In late 2017, Neptune was acquired for an undisclosed amount.

== History ==
Neptune was started by Simon Tian in January 2013. Before building a prototype or incorporating a company, Tian posted some conceptual drawings of a smartwatch, the Neptune Pine, on a website he built using Weebly, issued a press release announcing the product, and proceeded to receive more than 20,000 orders for the device in a few weeks. Tian then dropped out of school, and traveled to China to meet with contract manufacturers to have the device developed.

=== Neptune Pine ===
In November 2013, he launched a crowdfunding campaign for the Pine on Kickstarter. Within 27 hours, the campaign reached its funding goal of $100,000, and ultimately went on to raise more than $800,000 in 30 days.

The device started shipping to backers in August 2014, and eventually became widely available through Best Buy and Amazon. The Pine was featured in The Fate of the Furious, the CBS TV series Extant, and the music video for the Trey Songz song "Smartphones".

The Pine has gotten mixed reviews from the press, generally praising its extensive set of features, while criticizing its large size.

=== Neptune Suite ===
In March 2015, Neptune announced the Neptune Suite through an Indiegogo campaign, raising $1.2 million in a month. Christopher Mims of the Wall Street Journal described the Suite as "a literal interpretation of the fact that a smartwatch, smartphone and tablet are all just different size windows on the same set of apps and services." Cliff Kuang of Wired called the Suite "a taste of what computing should be in 2025".

=== Neptune acquisition ===
In late 2017, Neptune was acquired for an undisclosed amount.
