= Montréal–Notre-Dame-de-Grâce =

Coordinates: 45.47°N 73.63°W

Quebec electoral district

Defunct provincial electoral district
- Legislature: National Assembly of Quebec
- District created: 1939
- District abolished: 1965
- First contested: 1939
- Last contested: 1963 (by-election)

Montréal–Notre-Dame-de-Grâce (French pronunciation: [mɔ̃ʁeal nɔtʁə dam də ɡʁɑs]) was a former provincial electoral district in the Montreal region of Quebec, Canada that elected members to the Legislative Assembly of Quebec.

It was created for the 1939 election from part of Westmount electoral district. Its final general election was in 1962 (there was a 1963 by-election). It disappeared in the 1966 election and its successor electoral district was Notre-Dame-de-Grâce.

== Members of the Legislative Assembly ==
- James Arthur Mathewson, Liberal (1939–1948)
- Paul Earl, Liberal (1948–1963)
- Eric Kierans, Liberal (1963–1966)

== Election results ==
Montreal-Notre-Dame-de-Grâce by-election, September 2, 1963
Party	Candidate	Votes	%	±%
Liberal	Eric Kierans	21,878	85.62	+7.07
Independent	John Boyle	2,342	9.16	-
Independent Lib.	Luke Gerald Dougherty	1,108	4.34	-0.72
Independent Lib.	Henri Paquet	225	0.88	-

1962 Quebec general election
Party	Candidate	Votes	%	±%
Liberal	Paul Earl	37,100	78.55	+12.37
Union Nationale	Jeanne-L. Warren	7,743	16.39	-17.43
Independent Lib.	Luke Gerald Dougherty	2,389	5.06	-

1960 Quebec general election
Party	Candidate	Votes	%	±%
Liberal	Paul Earl	29,857	66.18	-11.26
Union Nationale	George Brown	15,255	33.82	+14.39

1956 Quebec general election
Party	Candidate	Votes	%	±%
Liberal	Paul Earl	28,175	77.44	+12.61
Union Nationale	Charles C. Brown	7,069	19.43	-5.02
Social Democratic	Michael H. Willie	629	1.73	-0.49
Labor–Progressive	Helen Hall	510	1.40	-

1952 Quebec general election
Party	Candidate	Votes	%	±%
Liberal	Paul Earl	18,489	64.83	-11.30
Union Nationale	Alfred M. West	6,973	24.45	+1.83
Independent	John Edward Lyall	2,066	7.24	-
CCF	Ross Edward Worrall	634	2.22	-
Independent Lib.	Moses Miller	359	1.26	-

1948 Quebec general election
Party	Candidate	Votes	%	±%
Liberal	Paul Earl	18,834	76.13	-2.00
Union Nationale	John Pozer Rowat	5,597	22.62	+19.91
Union of Electors	Roland Morin	309	1.25	-

1944 Quebec general election
Party	Candidate	Votes	%	±%
Liberal	James Arthur Mathewson	20,140	78.13	+3.18
CCF	James Wilson Thompson	2,431	9.43	-
Independent	Ernest Carl Werry	1,437	5.57	-
Bloc populaire	Joseph Lamoureux	1,070	4.15	-
Union Nationale	Arthur Reginald Whitney Plimsoll	699	2.71	-4.91

1939 Quebec general election
Party	Candidate	Votes	%
Liberal	James Arthur Mathewson	6,827	74.95
Independent Cons.	William Ross Bulloch	2,431	9.43
Union Nationale	Gerald MacPherson Almond	694	7.62
Independent Cons.	Henry Michael Clark	179	1.97
ALN	Gaétan Labrosse	111	1.22
