= Carole Mallette =

Canadian politician

Member of the National Assembly of Quebec for Huntingdon
- In office October 3, 2022 – August 27, 2026
- Preceded by: Claire IsaBelle
- Succeeded by: Frédéric Laplante

Personal details
- Born: 1981 Lasalle, Quebec
- Party: Coalition Avenir Québec

Carole Mallette is a Canadian politician, who was elected to the National Assembly of Quebec in the 2022 Quebec general election. She represented the riding of Huntingdon as a member of the Coalition Avenir Québec. On May 29, 2026, she said she would not seek a second term at the 2026 Quebec general election.

== Electoral record ==
2022 Quebec general election: Huntingdon
Party	Candidate	Votes	%	±%
Coalition Avenir Québec	Carole Mallette	13,664	46.64	+8.95
Liberal	Jean-Claude Poissant	4,214	14.39	-20.84
Conservative	François Gagnon	3,923	13.39	+12.02
Parti Québécois	Nathan Leblanc	3,522	12.02	+0.99
Québec solidaire	Emmanuelle Perras	3,265	11.15	-1.57
Green	José Bro	367	1.25	-0.29
Canadian	Raymond Frizzell	339	1.16	–
Total valid votes		29,294	98.71	
Total rejected ballots		384	1.29	
Turnout		29,678	64.27	-3.33
Electors on the lists		46,178		
Coalition Avenir Québec hold		Swing		–
