= Jean Boucher (politician) =

Canadian politician

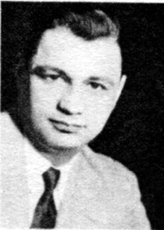

Member of the Canadian Parliament for Châteauguay—Huntingdon—Laprairie
- In office 1953–1958
- Preceded by: Donald Elmer Black
- Succeeded by: Merrill Edwin Barrington
- In office 1962–1963
- Preceded by: Merrill Edwin Barrington
- Succeeded by: Ian Watson

Personal details
- Born: February 20, 1926 Laprairie, Quebec, Canada
- Died: December 18, 2011 (aged 85)
- Party: Liberal
- Occupation: Civil law notary

Jean Boucher (February 20, 1926 – December 18, 2011) was a Canadian politician and notary. He was born in Laprairie, Quebec. He was elected to the House of Commons of Canada as a Member of the Liberal Party in 1953 and re-elected in 1957. He was defeated in 1958 then re-elected in 1962.
