= Stéphane Billette =

Canadian politician

Member of the National Assembly of Quebec for Huntingdon
- In office December 8, 2008 – August 29, 2018
- Preceded by: Albert De Martin
- Succeeded by: Claire IsaBelle

Personal details
- Born: April 21, 1971 (age 55) Howick, Quebec
- Party: Liberal

Stéphane Billette (born April 21, 1971) is a Canadian politician in the province of Quebec, who was elected to represent the riding of Huntingdon in the National Assembly of Quebec in the 2008 provincial election. He is a member of the Quebec Liberal Party.

Born in Howick, Quebec, Billette obtained a bachelor's degree in business administration. He worked as a general manager at the local development centre (CLD) for the Haut-Saint-Laurent, commissioner for the Beauharnois-Salaberry CLD and an agent for the Beauharnois-Salaberry economic development society. Billette has been heavily informed in the economic development of the southern and western Montérégie region, being a member of other associations related to the economic development. Billette is also running a company.

From April 2014 to October 2017 he served as the Chief Government Whip.

He served as Minister for Small and Medium Businesses.
