= Alexander Cameron (politician) =

Canadian politician

Member of the Legislative Assembly of Quebec for Huntingdon
- In office 1874–1892
- Preceded by: Thomas Sanders
- Succeeded by: George Washington Stephens

Personal details
- Born: January 4, 1834 Pictou, Nova Scotia
- Died: January 14, 1917 (aged 83) Montreal, Quebec, Canada
- Party: Liberal

Alexander Cameron (January 4, 1834 – January 14, 1917) was a physician and political figure in Quebec. He represented Huntingdon in the Legislative Assembly of Quebec from 1874 to 1892 as a Conservative and then Liberal member.

He was born in Pictou, Nova Scotia and educated at the Pictou Academy and the University of Glasgow. In 1866, he married Elizabeth McKenzie Wallace. He qualified to practise medicine in 1875 and set up practice in Huntingdon. Cameron served as a surgeon in the militia. He served as mayor of Huntingdon from 1870 to 1887 and was warden for Huntingdon County in 1882. He also served as a member of the Council of Public Instruction for Quebec. Cameron was first elected to the Quebec assembly as a Conservative in an 1874 by-election held after the death of Thomas Sanders. He was reelected in 1875 as a Liberal; that election was appealed but he won the by-election that followed in 1876. Cameron was defeated when he ran for reelection in 1892 and 1897. He died in Montreal at the age of 83.
