= James Arthur Mathewson =

Canadian politician

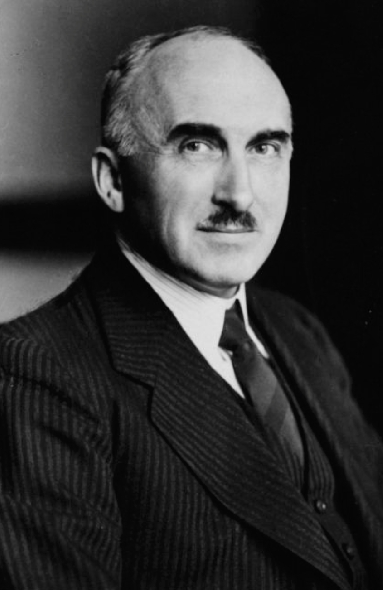

Member of the Legislative Assembly of Quebec for Montréal–Notre-Dame-de-Grâce
- In office 1939–1948
- Preceded by: District created in 1939
- Succeeded by: Paul Earl

Personal details
- Born: June 26, 1890 Montreal, Quebec
- Died: August 23, 1963 (aged 73) Montreal, Quebec
- Resting place: Mount Royal Cemetery
- Party: Liberal

James Arthur Mathewson (June 26, 1890 – August 23, 1963) was a Canadian politician.

Born in Montreal, Quebec, Mathewson received a Bachelor of Arts degree in 1912 and a Bachelor of Civil Law degree in 1917 from McGill University. He was called to the Quebec Bar in 1917. He was a captain in the 42nd Battalion Royal Highlanders of Canada during World War I. After the war, he was a lawyer in Montreal. He was created a King's Counsel in 1926.

He was a member of the Montreal City Council for Saint-André from 1926 to 1930. He ran unsuccessfully for mayor in 1930 losing to Camillien Houde. He was the Liberal member of the Legislative Assembly of Quebec for Montréal–Notre-Dame-de-Grâce from 1939 to 1948. He was treasurer of Quebec from 1939 to 1944.

He was awarded an honorary doctorate degree from McGill University in 1943.

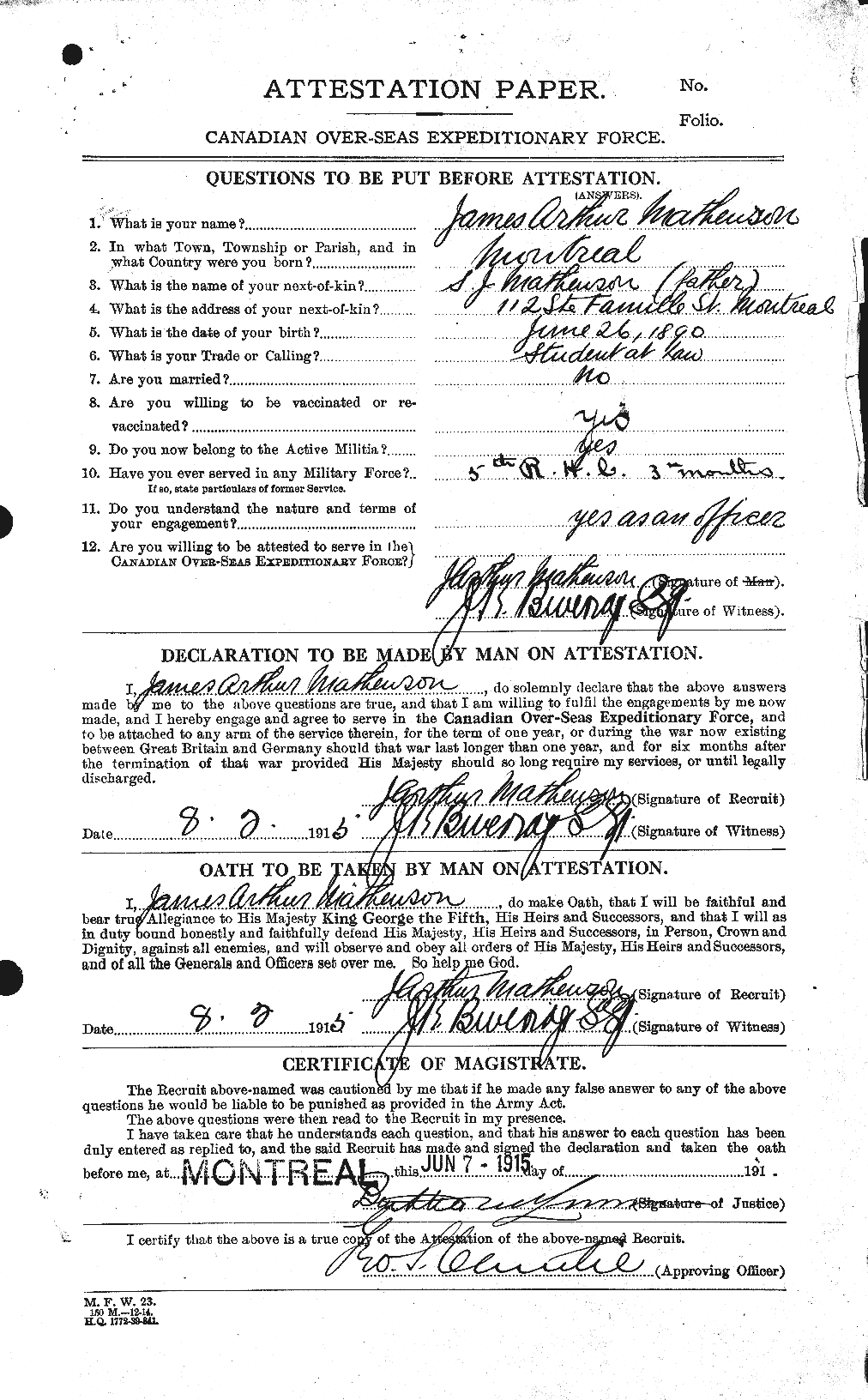
Enrollment papers of James Arthur Mathewson, former Treasurer of Quebec
