= Sir William Rose, 2nd Baronet =

Sir William Rose, 2nd Baronet, (1 April 1846 – 4 October 1902) was a Scots-Quebecer barrister and heir to the Rose baronetcy, of Montreal upon the death of his father Sir John Rose, 1st Baronet in 1888. In 1869 Sir John moved to London, and William Rose spent most of his life in London. His chief fame is perhaps as owner of Moor Park, Farnham during the late Victorian era.

== Life and family ==
In 1846 William Rose was born in Montreal as the first son of John Rose, who held various high offices in Canada. In 1872 John Rose was created 1st Baronet Rose, of Montreal. William Rose inherited the title in 1888. In 1909 William's younger brother Sir Charles Day Rose was created 1st Baronet Rose of Hardwick House in his own right. William Rose was educated at Rugby College. In 1868 he married Katherine Elizabeth, daughter of Alexander Macalister, Torresdaile Castle, Argyllshire. Cyril Stanley Rose, the heir to Sir William's title, was born to the couple in 1874. He was a business partner in the stock brokerage Govett, Sons, & Co.

== Arms ==
Coat of arms of Sir William Rose, 2nd Baronet
Crest A harp Or stringed Argent. Escutcheon Or a boar’s head couped Gules between three water bougets Sable on a chief of the second as many maple leaves of the first. Motto Audeo, Constant and True

Baronetage of the United Kingdom
Preceded by John Rose	Baronet (of Montreal); 1888–1902	Succeeded by Cyril Rose
