= Donald Elmer Black =

Canadian politician (1891–1980)

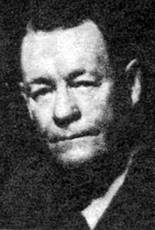

Member of the Canadian Parliament for Châteauguay—Huntingdon (1935–1949), Châteauguay—Huntingdon—Laprairie (1949–1953)
- In office 1935–1953
- Preceded by: John Clarke Moore
- Succeeded by: Jean Boucher

Personal details
- Born: September 21, 1891 St. Chrysostome, Quebec, Canada
- Died: April 15, 1981 (aged 88) Ormstown, Quebec, Canada
- Party: Liberal
- Occupation: farmer, merchant

Donald Elmer Black (September 21, 1891 – April 15, 1980) was a Quebec-born politician, farmer and merchant. He was elected to the House of Commons of Canada in 1935 as Member of the Liberal Party to represent the riding of Châteauguay—Huntingdon and re-elected in 1940 and 1945. He was re-elected to represent Châteauguay—Huntingdon—Laprairie in 1949.
