= Jean-Claude Poissant =

Canadian politician

Parliamentary Secretary to the Minister of Agriculture and Agri-Food
- In office December 2, 2015 – September 11, 2019
- Minister: Lawrence MacAulay
- Preceded by: Gerald Keddy
- Succeeded by: Neil Ellis

Member of Parliament for La Prairie
- In office October 19, 2015 – September 11, 2019
- Preceded by: district re-established
- Succeeded by: Alain Therrien

Personal details
- Born: 1960 (age 65–66) Saint-Philippe, Quebec, Canada
- Party: Liberal

Jean-Claude Poissant (French pronunciation: [ʒɑ̃ klod pwasɑ̃]; born 1960) is a Canadian politician who served as the Member of Parliament for the riding of La Prairie in the House of Commons of Canada from 2015 until his defeat in the 2019 election. He is a member of the Liberal Party of Canada. During his tenure, he served as Parliamentary Secretary to the Minister of Agriculture and Agri-Food. Poissant is a fourth-generation dairy and grain farmer and, prior to his election to the House of Commons, served as a municipal councillor.

== Electoral record ==
=== Federal ===
2019 Canadian federal election: La Prairie
Party	Candidate	Votes	%	±%	Expenditures
Bloc Québécois	Alain Therrien	25,707	41.8	+15.56	$16,299.46
Liberal	Jean-Claude Poissant	22,504	36.6	+0.14	$58,876.52
Conservative	Isabelle Lapointe	5,540	9.0	-2.91	none listed
New Democratic	Victoria Hernandez	4,744	7.7	-15.18	$0.10
Green	Barbara Joannette	2,565	4.2	+2.05	$362.15
People's	Gregory Yablunovsky	393	0.6	–	none listed
Marxist–Leninist	Normand Chouinard	100	0.2	-0.15	$0.00
Total valid votes/expense limit		61,553	100.0		
Total rejected ballots		886			
Turnout		62,439	71.95		
Eligible voters		86,779			
Bloc Québécois gain from Liberal		Swing		+7.71	
Source: Elections Canada

2015 Canadian federal election: La Prairie
Party	Candidate	Votes	%	±%	Expenditures
Liberal	Jean-Claude Poissant	20,993	36.46	+23.24	–
Bloc Québécois	Christian Picard	15,107	26.24	+0.51	–
New Democratic	Pierre Chicoine	13,174	22.88	-27.08	–
Conservative	Yves Perras	6,859	11.91	+2.46	–
Green	Joanne Tomas	1,235	2.15	+0.69	–
Marxist–Leninist	Normand Chouinard	204	0.35	–	–
Total valid votes/Expense limit		57,572	100.00		$218,081.80
Total rejected ballots		996	1.70	–	
Turnout		58,568	71.15	–	
Eligible voters		82,318			
Liberal gain from New Democratic		Swing		+25.16	
Source: Elections Canada

=== Provincial ===
2022 Quebec general election: Huntingdon
Party	Candidate	Votes	%	±%
Coalition Avenir Québec	Carole Mallette	13,664	46.64	+8.95
Liberal	Jean-Claude Poissant	4,214	14.39	-20.84
Conservative	François Gagnon	3,923	13.39	+12.02
Parti Québécois	Nathan Leblanc	3,522	12.02	+0.99
Québec solidaire	Emmanuelle Perras	3,265	11.15	-1.57
Green	José Bro	367	1.25	-0.29
Canadian	Raymond Frizzell	339	1.16	–
Total valid votes		29,294	98.71	
Total rejected ballots		384	1.29	
Turnout		29,678	64.27	-3.33
Electors on the lists		46,178		
Coalition Avenir Québec hold		Swing		–
