= Huntingdon (federal electoral district) =

Former federal electoral district in Quebec, Canada

Coordinates: 45.077°N 74.174°W

Quebec electoral district

Defunct federal electoral district
- Legislature: House of Commons
- District created: 1867
- District abolished: 1914
- First contested: 1867
- Last contested: 1911

Huntingdon was a federal electoral district in Quebec, Canada, that was represented in the House of Commons of Canada from 1867 to 1917.

It was created by the British North America Act, 1867. It was amalgamated into the Châteauguay—Huntingdon electoral district in 1914.

== Members of Parliament ==
This riding elected the following members of Parliament:

Parliament	Years	Member	Party
Huntingdon
1st	1867–1867	John Rose	Liberal–Conservative
1st	1867–1869	John Rose	Liberal–Conservative
1st	1869–1872	Julius Scriver	Liberal
2nd	1872–1874	Julius Scriver	Liberal
3rd	1874–1878	Julius Scriver	Liberal
4th	1878–1882	Julius Scriver	Liberal
5th	1882–1887	Julius Scriver	Liberal
6th	1887–1891	Julius Scriver	Liberal
7th	1891–1896	Julius Scriver	Liberal
8th	1896–1900	Julius Scriver	Liberal
9th	1900–1904	William Scott Maclaren	Liberal
10th	1904–1908	Robert Nelson Walsh	Conservative
11th	1908–1911	James Robb	Liberal
12th	1911–1917	James Robb	Liberal
Riding dissolved into Châteauguay—Huntingdon

== Election results ==
1867 Canadian federal election: Huntingdon
Party	Candidate	Votes	Elected
Liberal–Conservative	John Rose	1,280	✓
Unknown	W. Kerr	468	
Source: Canadian Elections Database

By-election on 28 November 1867 On Mr. Rose being named Minister of Finance, 18 November 1867
Party	Candidate	Votes
Liberal–Conservative	John Rose	acclaimed

By-election on 30 October 1869 On Mr. Rose's resignation, October 1869
Party	Candidate	Votes
Liberal	Julius Scriver	acclaimed

1872 Canadian federal election
Party	Candidate	Votes
Liberal	Julius Scriver	acclaimed
Source: Canadian Elections Database

1874 Canadian federal election
Party	Candidate	Votes
Liberal	Julius Scriver	876
Unknown	A. Cross	48
Source: lop.parl.ca

1878 Canadian federal election
Party	Candidate	Votes
Liberal	Julius Scriver	acclaimed

1882 Canadian federal election
Party	Candidate	Votes
Liberal	Julius Scriver	1,206
Unknown	C.P. Davidson	591

1887 Canadian federal election
Party	Candidate	Votes
Liberal	Julius Scriver	acclaimed

1891 Canadian federal election
Party	Candidate	Votes
Liberal	Julius Scriver	1,408
Conservative	Duncan McCormick	1,125

1896 Canadian federal election
Party	Candidate	Votes
Liberal	Julius Scriver	1,546
Conservative	William J. White	827

1900 Canadian federal election
Party	Candidate	Votes
Liberal	William Scott Maclaren	1,147
Conservative	Robert Nelson Walsh	1,123

1904 Canadian federal election
Party	Candidate	Votes
Conservative	Robert Nelson Walsh	1,274
Liberal	William Scott Maclaren	1,131

1908 Canadian federal election
Party	Candidate	Votes
Liberal	James Alexander Robb	1,292
Conservative	Robert Nelson Walsh	1,212

1911 Canadian federal election
Party	Candidate	Votes
Liberal	James Alexander Robb	1,318
Conservative	Robert Nelson Walsh	1,172

== See also ==
- List of Canadian electoral districts
- Historical federal electoral districts of Canada
