= James Walker Ross =

Canadian politician

Member of the Legislative Assembly of Quebec for Huntingdon
- In office 1939–1941
- Preceded by: Martin Fisher
- Succeeded by: Dennis James O'Connor

Personal details
- Born: March 18, 1885 Athelstan (Hinchinbrooke), Quebec
- Died: January 16, 1941 (aged 55) Powerscourt, Quebec
- Party: Liberal

James Walker Ross (March 18, 1885 – January 16, 1941) was a Canadian politician.

Born in Athelstan (Hinchinbrooke), Quebec, Ross was elected to the Legislative Assembly of Quebec for Huntingdon in 1939. A Liberal, he died in office in 1941.
