= Huntingdon (provincial electoral district) =

Provincial electoral district in Quebec, Canada

Quebec electoral district
- Coordinates: 45.051°N 74.032°W

Provincial electoral district
- Legislature: National Assembly of Quebec
MNA
Frédéric Laplante
Parti Québécois
- District created: 1867
- District abolished: 1988
- District re-created: 2001
- First contested: 1867
- Last contested: 2026

Demographics
- Electors (2012): 41,339
- Area (km²): 2,265.9
- Census subdivision(s): Dundee, Elgin, Franklin, Godmanchester, Havelock, Hemmingford (township), Hemmingford (village), Hinchinbrooke, Howick, Huntingdon, Lacolle, Napierville, Ormstown, Saint-Anicet, Sainte-Barbe, Saint-Bernard-de-Lacolle, Saint-Blaise-sur-Richelieu, Saint-Chrysostome, Sainte-Clotilde, Saint-Cyprien-de-Napierville, Saint-Édouard, Saint-Jacques-le-Mineur, Sainte-Martine, Saint-Michel, Saint-Patrice-de-Sherrington, Saint-Paul-de-l'Île-aux-Noix, Saint-Urbain-Premier, Saint-Valentin, Très-Saint-Sacrement; Akwesasne

Huntingdon is a provincial electoral district in the Montérégie region of Quebec, Canada, that elects members to the National Assembly of Quebec. It notably includes the municipalities of Sainte-Martine, Napierville, Ormstown, Saint-Michel, Saint-Anicet, Lacolle, and Sainte-Clotilde.

It was originally created for the 1867 election. Its final election was in 1989 and its successor electoral district was Beauharnois-Huntingdon.

It was re-created for the 2003 election from parts of Beauharnois-Huntingdon and Saint-Jean electoral districts.

In the change from the 2001 to the 2011 electoral map, it lost Saint-Rémi to the newly created Sanguinet electoral district.

In 2026, it gained Saint-Blaise-sur-Richelieu.

== Members of the Legislative Assembly / National Assembly ==
Legislature	Years	Member	Party
1st	1867–1869	Julius Scriver	Conservative
1st	1869–1871	William Cantwell	Conservative
2nd	1871–1874†	Thomas Sanders	Conservative
2nd	1874–1875	Alexander Cameron	Conservative
3rd	1875–1876	Alexander Cameron	Liberal
3rd	1876–1878	Alexander Cameron	Liberal
4th	1878–1881	Alexander Cameron	Liberal
5th	1881–1886	Alexander Cameron	Liberal
6th	1886–1890	Alexander Cameron	Liberal
7th	1890–1892	Alexander Cameron	Liberal
8th	1892–1897	George Washington Stephens Sr.	Liberal
9th	1897–1900	George Washington Stephens Sr.	Liberal
10th	1900–1904	William H. Walker	Liberal
11th	1904–1908	William H. Walker	Liberal
12th	1908–1912	William H. Walker	Liberal
13th	1912–1913†	William H. Walker	Liberal
13th	1913–1916	Andrew Philps	Liberal
14th	1916–1919	Andrew Philps	Liberal
15th	1919–1923	Andrew Philps	Liberal
16th	1923–1927	Andrew Philps	Liberal
17th	1927–1929†	Andrew Philps	Liberal
17th	1929–1931	Martin Fisher	Conservative
18th	1931–1935	Martin Fisher	Conservative
19th	1935–1936	Martin Fisher	Conservative
20th	1936–1939	Martin Fisher	Union Nationale
21st	1939–1941†	James Walker Ross	Liberal
21st	1941–1944	Dennis James O'Connor	Liberal
22nd	1944–1946†	Dennis James O'Connor	Liberal
22nd	1947–1948	John Gillies Rennie	Union Nationale
23rd	1948–1952	John Gillies Rennie	Union Nationale
24th	1952–1956	Henry Alister Darby Somerville	Union Nationale
25th	1956–1960	Henry Alister Darby Somerville	Union Nationale
26th	1960–1962	Henry Alister Darby Somerville	Union Nationale
27th	1962–1966	Henry Alister Darby Somerville	Union Nationale
28th	1966–1970	Kenneth Fraser	Liberal
29th	1970–1973	Kenneth Fraser	Liberal
30th	1973–1976	Kenneth Fraser	Liberal
31st	1976–1979	Claude Dubois	Union Nationale
31st	1979–1981	Claude Dubois	Liberal
32nd	1981–1985	Claude Dubois	Liberal
33rd	1985–1989	Claude Dubois	Liberal
Riding dissolved into Beauharnois-Huntingdon
Riding re-created from Beauharnois-Huntingdon and Saint-Jean
37th	2003–2007	André Chenail	Liberal
38th	2007–2008	Albert De Martin	Action démocratique
39th	2008–2012	Stéphane Billette	Liberal
40th	2012–2014	Stéphane Billette	Liberal
41st	2014–2018	Stéphane Billette	Liberal
42nd	2018–2022	Claire IsaBelle	Coalition Avenir Québec
43rd	2022–2026	Carole Mallette	Coalition Avenir Québec
44th	2026–Present	Frédéric Laplante	Parti Québécois

== Election results ==
2026 Quebec general election
** Preliminary results — Not yet official **
Party	Candidate	Votes	%	±%
Parti Québécois	Frédéric Laplante	10,110	30.48	+18.21
Liberal	Connor Stacey	8,505	25.64	+11.66
Conservative	Chantal Dauphinais	8,475	25.55	+12.19
Coalition Avenir Québec	Stéphane Bisaillon	4,022	12.13	–34.68
Québec solidaire	Valérie Dubois	1,856	5.60	–5.60
Canadian	Dale Langille	202	0.61	–0.55
Total valid votes		33,170	98.23	–0.48
Total rejected ballots		598	1.77	+0.48
Turnout		33,768	67.04	+2.77
Electors on the lists		50,373		
Parti Québécois notional gain from Coalition Avenir Québec		Swing		+3.28
Source: Élections Québec

2022 Quebec general election redistributed results
Party	Vote	%
Coalition Avenir Québec	14,296	46.81
Liberal	4,269	13.98
Conservative	4,080	13.36
Parti Québécois	3,746	12.27
Québec solidaire	3,422	11.20
Others	729	2.39

2022 Quebec general election
Party	Candidate	Votes	%	±%
Coalition Avenir Québec	Carole Mallette	13,664	46.64	+8.95
Liberal	Jean-Claude Poissant	4,214	14.39	-20.84
Conservative	François Gagnon	3,923	13.39	+12.02
Parti Québécois	Nathan Leblanc	3,522	12.02	+0.99
Québec solidaire	Emmanuelle Perras	3,265	11.15	-1.57
Green	José Bro	367	1.25	-0.29
Canadian	Raymond Frizzell	339	1.16	–
Total valid votes		29,294	98.71	
Total rejected ballots		384	1.29	
Turnout		29,678	64.27	-3.33
Electors on the lists		46,178		
Coalition Avenir Québec hold		Swing		–

2018 Quebec general election
Party	Candidate	Votes	%	±%
Coalition Avenir Québec	Claire IsaBelle	10,893	37.69	+14.04
Liberal	Stéphane Billette	10,182	35.23	-13.34
Québec solidaire	Aiden Hodgins-Ravensbergen	3,676	12.72	+7.59
Parti Québécois	Huguette Hébert	3,188	11.03	-9.25
Green	Victoria Mary Haliburton	444	1.54	
Conservative	Jérémie Ouellette	396	1.37	+0.42
New Democratic	Charles Orme	126	0.44	
Total valid votes		28,905	98.27	
Total rejected ballots		508	1.73	
Turnout		29,413	67.60	
Eligible voters		43,512		
Coalition Avenir Québec gain from Liberal		Swing		+13.69
Source(s) "Rapport des résultats officiels du scrutin". Élections Québec.

2008 Quebec general election
Party	Candidate	Votes	%	±%
Liberal	Stéphane Billette	11178	44.01	
Parti Québécois	Joan Gosselin	6988	27.51	
Action démocratique	Albert De Martin	6372	25.09	
Québec solidaire	Stephane Thellen	863	3.40	

2007 Quebec general election
Party	Candidate	Votes	%	±%
Action démocratique	Albert De Martin	13480	42.90	+25.08
Liberal	André Chenail	9883	31.45	-21.08
Parti Québécois	Éric Pigeon	7070	22.50	-5.62
Québec solidaire	Marc Pronovost	693	2.21	
Independent	Jean Siouville	295	0.94	

2003 Quebec general election
Party	Candidate	Votes	%	±%
Liberal	André Chenail	15512	52.53	
Parti Québécois	François Boileau	8302	28.12	
Action démocratique	Michel Lavoie	5261	17.82	
Bloc Pot	Kenneth Rimmer	452	1.53	

== See also ==
- List of Quebec provincial electoral districts
- Canadian provincial electoral districts
