= Stéphane Gendron =

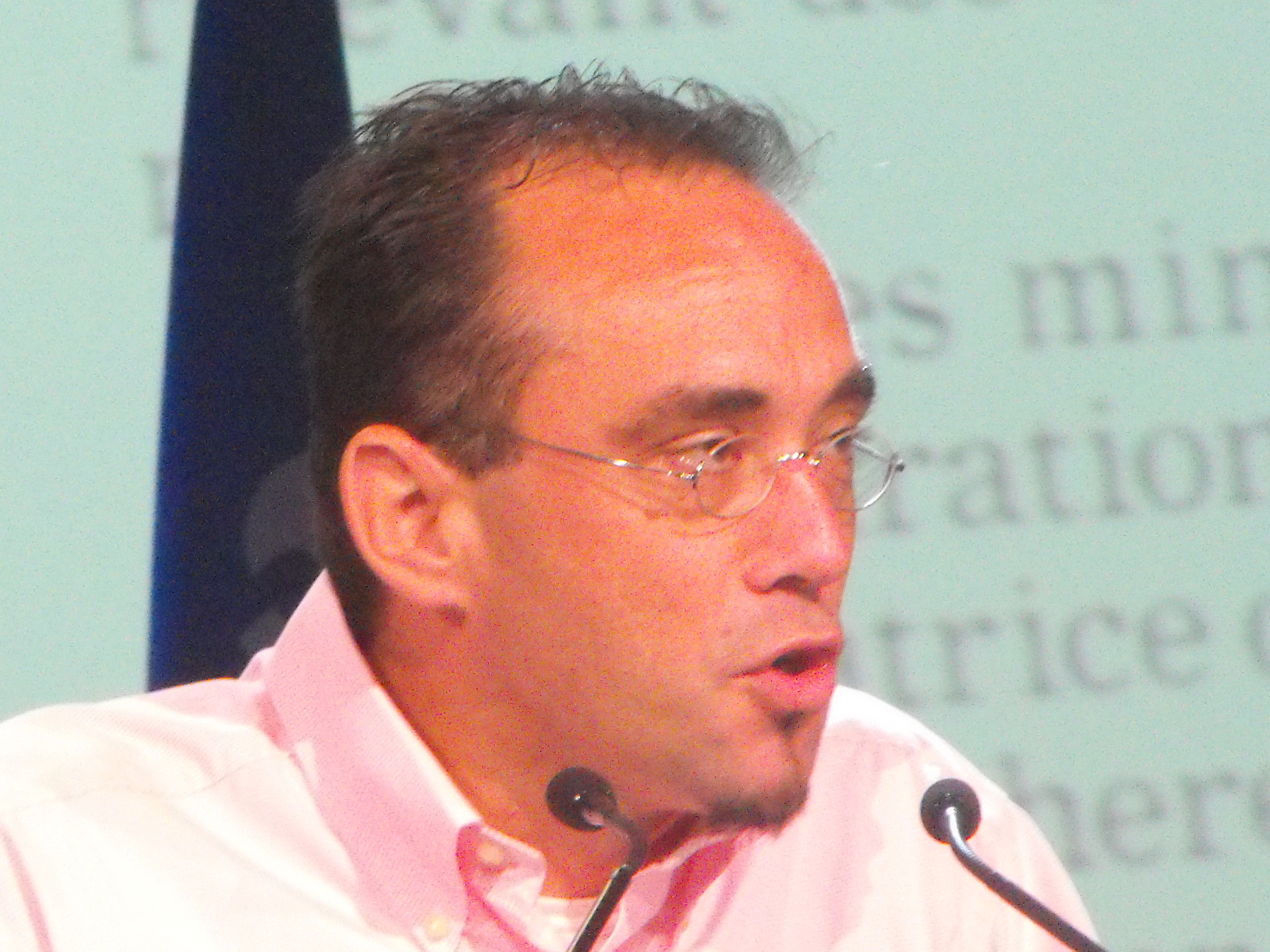

Mayor of Huntingdon, Quebec
- In office November 2003 – November 2013
- Preceded by: André Brunette
- Succeeded by: André Brunette

Personal details
- Born: December 22, 1967 (age 58) Saint-Jean-sur-Richelieu, Quebec
- Relations: Virginie Chaloux-Gendron (daughter)
- Education: Université de Montréal (LL.B.); University of Massachusetts Lowell (M.A.)
- Occupation: Politician, political analyst
- Profession: Lawyer

Stéphane Gendron (born December 22, 1967) was the mayor of Huntingdon, Quebec, Canada, from 2003 to 2013 and a radio host, a television host and a political analyst for several media outlets.

== Early life and education ==
He was born in Saint-Jean-sur-Richelieu and raised in nearby Saint-Rémi in the Montérégie.

Gendron is a graduate of Collège Jean de la Mennais in La Prairie and has a law degree from the Université de Montréal and master's degree in history from the University of Massachusetts Lowell.

== Career ==
Prior to his political and media career, Gendron practised law and taught at the CEGEP level. He was also a political aide to former Parti Québécois politician Jean Garon.

=== Mayor of Huntingdon ===
Gendron was elected Mayor of Huntingdon in November 2003 and was re-elected without opposition for a four-year term in November 2005, and re-elected in November 2009. He stepped down from municipal politics at the end of his mandate in November 2013.

== Controversy ==
=== Youth curfew ===
Gendron first gained media attention by enacting a municipal curfew forcing minors to stay off the street after 10 p.m. in Huntingdon, in an attempt to reduce juvenile crime. Following threats of litigation, the municipal council withdrew the proposed curfew. It was later discovered that the authors of the crime spree were, in fact, both adults.

=== Jean Charest ===
In 2005, he claimed that Quebec premier Jean Charest was a "murderer" ("meurtrier") for his government's initial refusal to subsidize Herceptin, a new drug against breast cancer; he later apologized for these comments after being served legal papers.

=== Israel/Nazi analogy ===
Gendron has courted controversy for his statements about the state of Israel. During the Israel/Lebanon war of 2006, he stated in an interview with Le Soleil that Israelis are modern-day Nazis ("Les Israéliens, ce sont les nazis des temps modernes"); he later clarified that was referring to the current Government of Israel, but stated that it was not exaggerated to compare that government with the Nazis.

=== Statement that Israel ‘does not deserve to exist’ ===
In December 2011, Gendron was criticized for a broadcast of his show Face à Face in which he stated that “Products made in Israel on land stolen from the Palestinians that is walled in, in an apartheid regime where they are cut off, it’s very serious.... And a country like that does not deserve to exist.” The remarks sparked outrage from Jewish groups after a clip of the show was posted on YouTube by HonestReporting Canada, a website that monitors the media for anti-Israel bias. The California-based Simon Wiesenthal Center has since launched a protest against the network demanding Mr. Gendron's show be cancelled. In response, Gendron stated that he was not promoting hate speech against Jews or Israel, but rather taking issue with the country's politics, writing in an email that “I am defending a state with both Palestine and Israel living together, I may be naive, but this is my position. Israel as it is today is not my cup of tea.”

=== Stephen Harper ===
On January 12, 2009, Stéphane Gendron insulted Canadian Prime Minister Stephen Harper in a letter that he also posted on his blog. for his support of Israel during the 2008–2009 Israel–Gaza conflict.

Dear Prime Minister Stephen Harper:

Considering the vote taken at the Human Rights Committee of the United Nations in Geneva and the position of Canada in regards of the genocide conducted by the Zionist Government of Israel:

On behalf of my Administration:

You are a shame for Canada;
You are just disgusting;
You have no clue of History and Humanity;
You are just a band-wagon follower of Israel, its racist Government, and the dumb president Bush and the Republican Party;

Go and read some history books. Your position do not represent the majority of Canadians and you have no mandate to encourage the criminals of the Government of Israel.
You act like Chamberlain dealing with Hitler before World War II.
Just a plain blind sinister person — You are.

The Mayor of Huntingdon (Quebec),
Stephane Gendron
January 12, 2009

=== Allegations of harassment ===
In January 2009, Stéphane Gendron was accused by Huntingdon town councillor Tonya Welburn of criminal and sexual harassment over an 18-month period. A complaint has been lodged with the Quebec Human Rights Commission. Same thing for criminal accusations. This chapter is directly related to a fight led by a former Member of the National Assembly for Huntingdon. Tonya Welburn lost her seat during the general election of November 2009, as well as her father who was also a councillor but running for mayor. Gendron got close to 66% of the popular vote. Gendron denied the accusation.

=== Animal cruelty ===
Stéphane Gendron claimed that he enthusiastically ran over cats with his pickup truck on his radio show, which aired on July 9, 2013, on CHOI 91.9 Radio X. His comments were denounced by the Society for the Prevention of Cruelty to Animals, and a petition was launched that demanded he be investigated. He later apologized for his comments, claiming he had exaggerated. He also claimed it was dark humour that was taken too seriously and out of context by animal advocacy groups.

== Career in the media ==
Gendron hosted the current affairs TV show L'Avocat et le diable on the TQS network, but was fired after the network received several complaints from the Canadian Radio-television and Telecommunications Commissionfor several controversial comments. He later hosted a radio show on Montreal-based station 98,5 FM from March 2005 until March 2007. He now hosts the program Sans Compromis on XM Satellite Radio's Radio Parallèle.

Gendron is a regular columnist with the Journal de Montréal daily newspaper. He was also a TV commentator with the daily program Le Show du Matin on Channel V. He is also a regular radio commentator in Eastern Québec (La Pocatière, Rivière-d-Loup, Rimouski and St-Georges). He co- hosts a show called Face a Face on Channel V

== Provincial and federal politics ==
In February 2007, Gendron declined a bid to run for the Parti Québécois in his hometown riding of Huntingdon, claiming family reasons and the wish to complete his term as mayor. During the 2007 Quebec general election, he supported the Action démocratique du Québec party. In April 2008, Gendron called for Mario Dumont's resignation, claiming that he is especially disappointed with the way the ADQ leader has handled the immigration issue since becoming Leader of the Opposition.

At once, Gendron was approached by the Conservative Party of Canada to be a candidate for the federal election of 2008. He declined the offer, distanced himself from the party's foreign policy and endorsed the Bloc Québécois.

Following the ADQ's disappointing results in the 2008 election, Gendron expressed an interest in running for the party leadership in the event of Dumont's resignation.

== Personal life ==
Gendron has a daughter, writer, Virginie Chaloux-Gendron. As of 2025, the two have no contact with each other.
