= Claire IsaBelle =

Canadian politician

Member of the National Assembly of Quebec for Huntingdon
- In office October 1, 2018 – August 28, 2022
- Preceded by: Stéphane Billette
- Succeeded by: Carole Mallette

Personal details
- Party: Coalition Avenir Québec

Claire IsaBelle is a Canadian politician, who was elected to the National Assembly of Quebec in the 2018 provincial election. She represented the electoral district of Huntingdon as a member of the Coalition Avenir Québec.
