= Sainte-Clotilde, Quebec =

Municipality in Quebec, Canada

Sainte-Clotilde
- Municipality
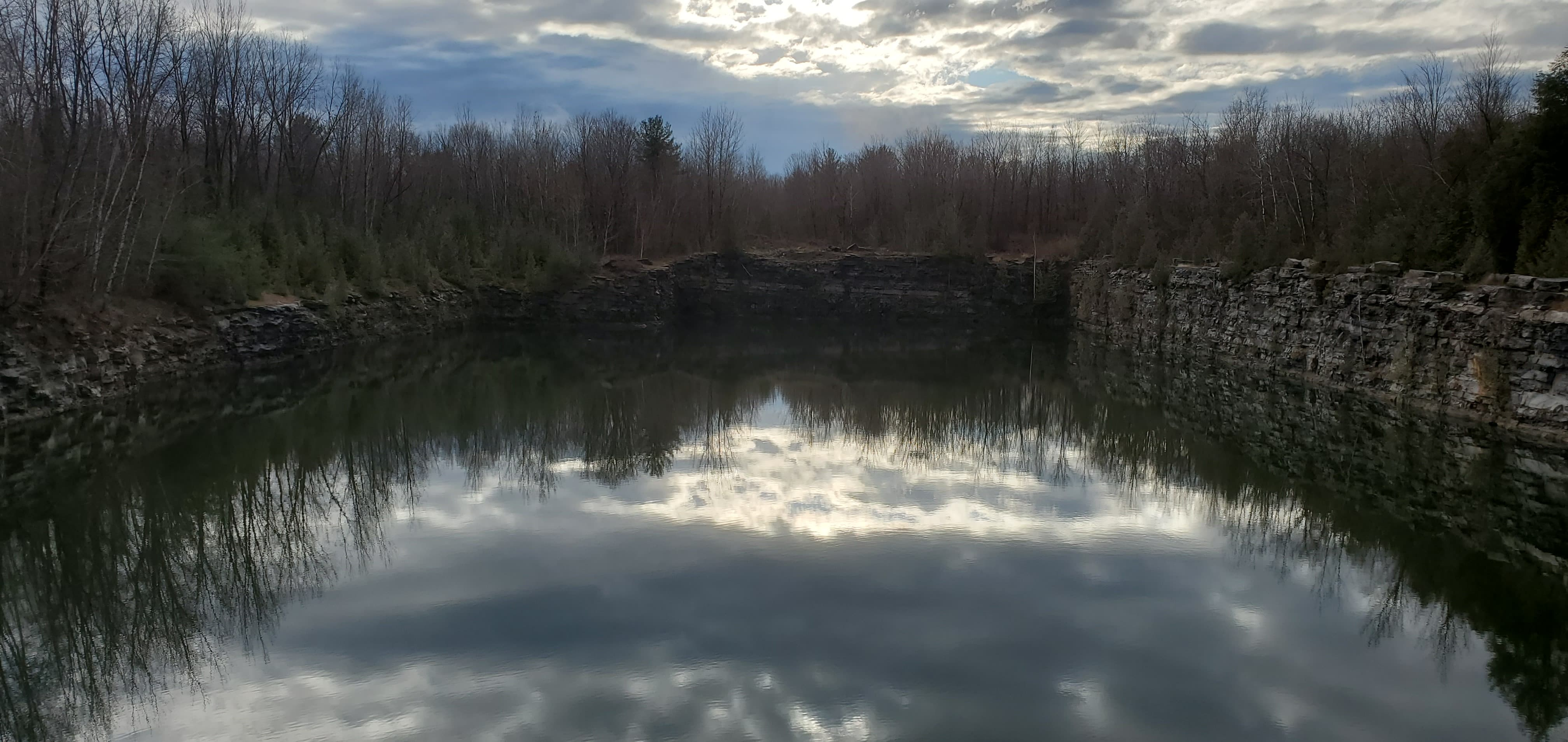

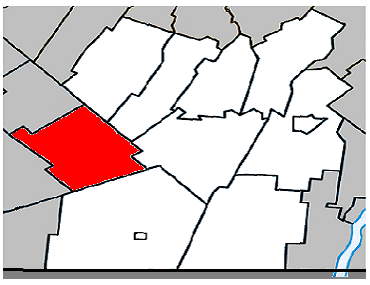
- Location within Les Jardins-de-Napierville RCM

- Location in southern Quebec
- Coordinates: 45°09′N 73°41′W
- Country: Canada
- Province: Quebec
- Region: Montérégie
- RCM: Les Jardins-de-Napierville
- Constituted: April 2, 1885

Government
  - Mayor: Guy-Julien Mayné
  - Federal riding: Châteauguay—Les Jardins-de-Napierville
  - Prov. riding: Huntingdon

Area
  - Total: 78.48 km^{2} (30.30 sq mi)
  - Land: 78.21 km^{2} (30.20 sq mi)

Population (2021)
  - Total: 2,646
  - Density: 33.8/km^{2} (88/sq mi)
  - Pop (2016-21): ▲63.1%
  - Dwellings: 829
- Time zone: UTC−5 (EST)
  - Summer (DST): UTC−4 (EDT)
- Postal code(s): J0L 1W0
- Area codes: 450 and 579
- Highways: R-205 R-209
- Geocode: 68020
- Website: www.ste-clotilde.ca

Sainte-Clotilde (French pronunciation: [sɛ̃t klɔtild]) is a municipality in the Jardins de Napierville Regional County Municipality in Quebec, Canada, situated in the Montérégie administrative region. The population as of the Canada 2021 Census was 2,646.

From 1984 to February 6, 2010, it was known as Sainte-Clotilde-de-Châteauguay.

== Demographics ==
=== Population ===
Canada census – Sainte-Clotilde community profile

	2021	2016	2011
Population	2,646 (+63.1% from 2016)	1,622 (-4.8% from 2011)	1,704 (+6.0% from 2006)
Land area	78.21 km^{2} (30.20 sq mi)	78.39 km^{2} (30.27 sq mi)	78.73 km^{2} (30.40 sq mi)
Population density	33.8/km^{2} (88/sq mi)	20.7/km^{2} (54/sq mi)	21.6/km^{2} (56/sq mi)
Median age	37.6 (M: 38.0, F: 37.2)	41.6 (M: 41.4, F: 42.1)	41.5 (M: 41.2, F: 42.0)
Private dwellings	829 (total) 783 (occupied)	704 (total)	669 (total)
Median household income	$79,500	$60,459	$NA

Notes: 2011 income data for this area has been suppressed for data quality or confidentiality reasons.
References: 2021 2016 2011

Historical Census Data - Sainte-Clotilde, Quebec

Year	Pop.	±%
1921	1,032	—
1931	872	−15.5%
1941	943	+8.1%
1951	1,079	+14.4%
1956	1,051	−2.6%
1961	1,099	+4.6%

Year	Pop.	±%
1966	1,164	+5.9%
1971	1,166	+0.2%
1976	1,220	+4.6%
1981	1,400	+14.8%
1986	1,442	+3.0%
1991	1,524	+5.7%

Year	Pop.	±%
1996	1,595	+4.7%
2001	1,558	−2.3%
2006	1,608	+3.2%
2011	1,704	+6.0%
2016	1,622	−4.8%
2021	2,646	+63.1%

Source: Statistics Canada

=== Language ===
Canada Census Mother Tongue - Sainte-Clotilde, Quebec
Census	Total	French			English			French & English			Other		
Year	Responses	Count	Trend	Pop %	Count	Trend	Pop %	Count	Trend	Pop %	Count	Trend	Pop %
2021	2,645	2,420	▲61.3%	91.5%	75	▲36.4%	2.8%	65	▲550.0%	2.5%	80	▲45.5%	3.0%
2016	1,625	1,500	▲3.8%	92.3%	55	▼15.4%	3.4%	10	0.0%	0.6%	55	▼69.4%	3.4%
2011	1,700	1,445	▼0.7%	85.0%	65	▲85.7%	3.8%	10	0.0%	0.6%	180	▲63.6%	10.6%
2006	1,610	1,455	▲5.8%	90.4%	35	▼63.2%	2.2%	10	▲ n/a%	0.6%	110	▲57.1%	6.8%
2001	1,540	1,375	▼9.2%	89.3%	95	▲90.0%	6.2%	0	▼100.0%	0.0%	70	▲366.7%	4.5%
1996	1,595	1,515	n/a	95.0%	50	n/a	3.1%	15	n/a	0.9%	15	n/a	0.9%

== See also ==
- List of municipalities in Quebec
