= William Scott Maclaren =

Canadian politician

William Scott Maclaren (January 29, 1845 – September 13, 1909) was a political figure in Quebec, Canada. He represented Huntingdon in the House of Commons of Canada from 1900 to 1904 as a Liberal.

He was born in Lachute, Canada East, the son of John Maclaren and Janet McIntosh, and was educated at the Huntingdon Academy. In 1875, he married Mary Henderson. Maclaren was secretary-treasurer for Huntingdon and Godmanchester Township. He served in the 50th battalion from 1863 to 1889, retiring at the rank of major. He was defeated when he ran for reelection in 1904.
