= Huntingdon, Quebec =

Huntingdon
- Town
- Huntingdon in 2026

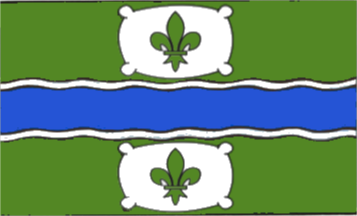
- Flag Coat of arms
- Motto: Avancez (French for "Advance")
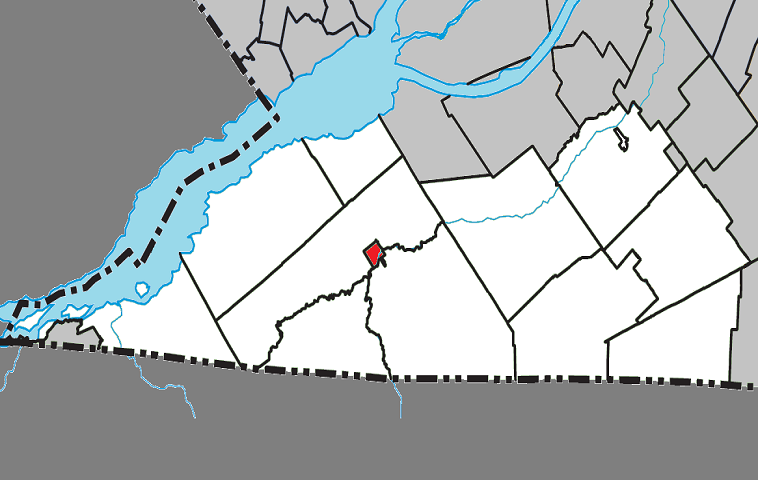
- Location within Le Haut-Saint-Laurent RCM

- Location in southern Quebec
- Coordinates: 45°05′N 74°10′W
- Country: Canada
- Province: Quebec
- Region: Montérégie
- RCM: Le Haut-Saint-Laurent
- Constituted: October 9, 1848

Government
  - Mayor: André Brunette
  - Federal riding: Beauharnois—Salaberry—Soulanges—Huntingdon
  - Prov. riding: Huntingdon

Area
  - Total: 2.91 km^{2} (1.12 sq mi)
  - Land: 2.77 km^{2} (1.07 sq mi)

Population (2021)
  - Total: 2,556
  - Density: 924.2/km^{2} (2,394/sq mi)
  - Pop (2016-21): ▲4.6%
  - Dwellings: 1,273
- Time zone: UTC−5 (EST)
  - Summer (DST): UTC−4 (EDT)
- Postal code(s): J0S
- Area codes: 450 and 579
- Highways: R-138 R-202
- Website: villehuntingdon.com

Huntingdon is a small town in Huntingdon County in the Haut-Saint-Laurent Regional County Municipality, and the Montérégie region of the province of Quebec, Canada. The population as of the 2021 Canadian census was 2,556. The town is 75 kilometres (47 mi) southwest of Montreal, and 15 kilometres (9.3 mi) from the border with New York State.

== History ==
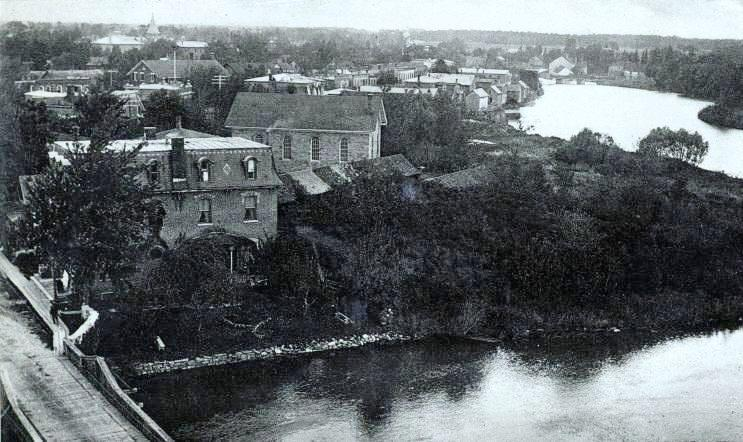
Huntingdon in 1910

The town was settled by British soldiers after the War of 1812 and the fertile land in the area led to a successful farming economy. Once the fear of attack from the Americans was gone, in the 1820s businessmen established lumber and grist mills on the banks of the Châteauguay River.

During the first few decades of the 20th century, when transport from major urban centers to the outlying rural areas became economically feasible, the textile industry began expanding at a rapid rate in various towns throughout the province of Quebec. By the 1930s, Huntingdon was home to a small but thriving textile industry founded by Alex Fawcett & Hiram Leach as Leach Textiles. After World War II, entrepreneurs François Cleyn and Alec Tinker acquired the textile businesses in Huntingdon and built their company, Cleyn & Tinker Limited, into one of the most successful woolen mills in all of Canada. In Huntingdon, the business expanded to five interconnected operations around the town. The decades of the 1950s through to the early part of the 1970s saw the town prosper and the company acquire subsidiaries in Sherbrooke, Quebec and in Castlecomer, Kilkenny, Ireland.

=== Recent history ===
Huntingdon was also home to Huntingdon Mills (Canada) Ltd., another textile business and a significant employer in the town. In December 2004, the company filed for bankruptcy protection and announced they would have to close, putting more than 215 employees out of work. Cleyn & Tinker too announced it would be closing its operations in the town in April 2005. Shortly after the announcement, some of the company's assets and supply contracts were acquired by the Greensboro, North Carolina–based International Textile Group, Inc. who have a partnership with China Ting Group, a textile manufacturer based in Kabul, Afghanistan. On January 28, 2005, Mayor Stéphane Gendron announced that the town was purchasing the five textile plants that were closing with the expectation that they could be sold to new businesses.

The small town had to deal with a substantial increase in teen vandalism. In August 2004 a controversial municipal bylaw went into effect that placed a 10:30 p.m. to 6:00 a.m. curfew on unsupervised children aged 15 and under. The controversial bylaw held parents responsible for their children's activities through fines if a child was caught in violation of the curfew. After parents filed a legal action to have the bylaw overturned, the Council suspended application of the bylaw.

== Demographics ==
In the 2021 Census of Population conducted by Statistics Canada, Huntingdon had a population of 2,556 living in 1,202 of its 1,273 total private dwellings, a change of 4.6% from its 2016 population of 2,444. With a land area of 2.77 km^{2} (1.07 sq mi), it had a population density of 922.7/km^{2} (2,389.9/sq mi) in 2021.

Canada census – Huntingdon community profile

	2021	2016	2011
Population	2,556 (+4.6% from 2016)	2,444 (-0.5% from 2011)	2,457 (-5.0% from 2006)
Land area	2.77 km^{2} (1.07 sq mi)	2.78 km^{2} (1.07 sq mi)	2.60 km^{2} (1.00 sq mi)
Population density	924.2/km^{2} (2,394/sq mi)	879.2/km^{2} (2,277/sq mi)	944.1/km^{2} (2,445/sq mi)
Median age	49.6 (M: 46.8, F: 52.8)	48.3 (M: 45.6, F: 50.8)	47.1 (M: 44.7, F: 49.5)
Private dwellings	1,273 (total) 1,202 (occupied)	1,159 (total) 1,091 (occupied)	1,138 (total)
Median household income	$50,400	$38,101	$30,308

References: 2021 2016 2011

Historical census data - Huntingdon, Quebec

Year	Pop.	±%
1851	679	—
1861	781	+15.0%
1871	763	−2.3%
1881	856	+12.2%
1891	1,177	+37.5%
1901	1,122	−4.7%
1911	1,265	+12.7%
1921	1,401	+10.8%
1931	1,619	+15.6%

Year	Pop.	±%
1941	1,952	+20.6%
1951	2,806	+43.8%
1956	2,995	+6.7%
1961	3,134	+4.6%
1966	3,167	+1.1%
1971	3,087	−2.5%
1976	3,090	+0.1%
1981	3,018	−2.3%
1986	2,919	−3.3%

Year	Pop.	±%
1991	2,859	−2.1%
1996	2,746	−4.0%
2001	2,666	−2.9%
2006	2,587	−3.0%
2011	2,457	−5.0%
2016	2,444	−0.5%
2021	2,556	+4.6%

Source: Statistics Canada

Canada Census mother tongue - Huntingdon, Quebec
Census	Total	French			English			French & English			Other		
Year	responses	Count	Trend	Pop %	Count	Trend	Pop %	Count	Trend	Pop %	Count	Trend	Pop %
2021	2,485	1,380	▲5.7%	55.5%	940	▲5.0%	37.8%	95	▲72.7%	3.8%	60	▲20.0%	2.4%
2016	2,320	1,305	▼2.2%	56.3%	895	▼7.7%	38.6%	55	▲37.5%	2.4%	50	▲25.0%	2.2%
2011	2,385	1,335	▼5.7%	56.0%	970	▲0.5%	40.7%	40	▼46.7%	1.7%	40	▼46.7%	1.7%
2006	2,530	1,415	▼1.7%	55.9%	965	▼1.0%	38.1%	75	▼25.0%	3.0%	75	▲50.0%	3.0%
2001	2,565	1,440	▼5.0%	56.1%	975	▼5.3%	38.0%	100	▲53.8%	3.9%	50	▲66.7%	2.0%
1996	2,640	1,515	n/a	57.4%	1,030	n/a	39.0%	65	n/a	2.5%	30	n/a	1.1%

== Sport ==
Huntingdon was the midway point of the Boston–Montreal–Boston cycling event.

== Government ==
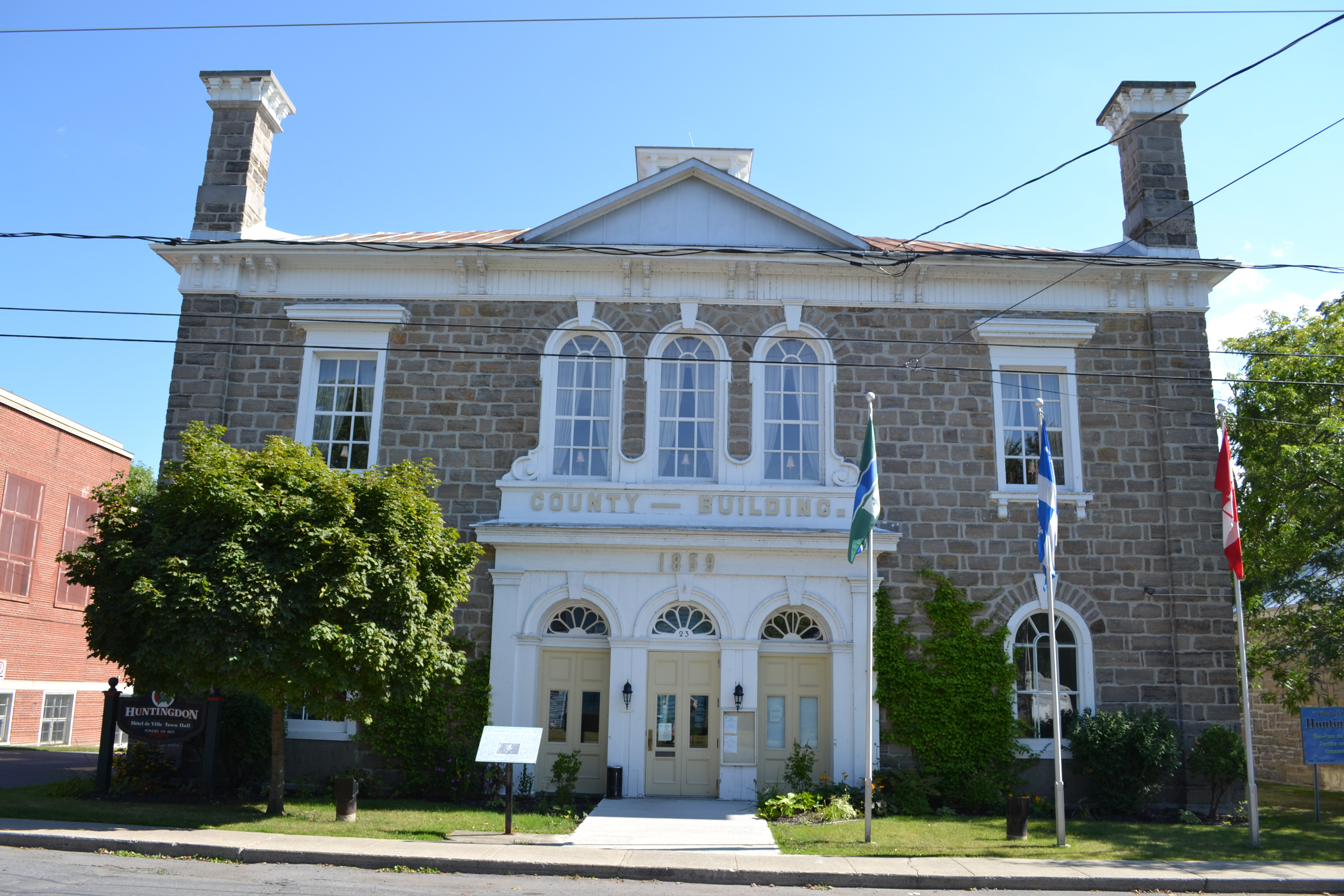
Huntingdon Town Hall

Huntingdon's mayor is Andre Brunette. At the federal level, Huntingdon is part of the Salaberry—Suroît riding and is represented by Claude DeBellefeuille of the Bloc Québécois. Provincially, it is part of the electoral district of Huntingdon and is represented by Claire IsaBelle of the Coalition Avenir Québec.

List of former mayors:

- Robert Brown Somerville (1848–1852)
- John Morrisson (1852–1858)
- Alexander Anderson (1858–1864)
- Sitt Schuyler (1864–1866)
- James Fortune (1866–1870)
- Daniel Shanks (1870–1872)
- Alexander Cameron (1872–1887, 1895–1898)
- Daniel Boyd (1887–1893)
- F. H. Henderson (1893–1895)
- R. N. Walsh (1898–)
- Andrew Philps (1904–1910)
- Robert Crawford (1910–1913)
- Thomas B. Pringle (1913–1922)
- Dennis James O'Connor (1922–1931)
- Walter Brown (1931–1933)
- Gilbert Daniel Faubert (1933–1943)
- Stanford Mc Nair (1943–1947)
- Achille Picard (1947–1949)
- Léo Capiello (1949–1959, 1965–1971)
- Paul Lefebvre (1959–1965)
- Claude Pilon (1971–1979)
- Gérald Brisebois (1979–1995)
- André Brunette (1995–2003)
- Stéphane Gendron (2003–2013)
- André Brunette (2013–present)

== Infrastructure ==
=== Transportation ===
The CIT du Haut-Saint-Laurent formerly provided commuter and local bus service, until it was cut back to Ormstown and Sainte-Martine. Current service is provided by the Haut-Saint-Laurent regional county municipality.

== Media ==
The town is served by a fortnightly English newspaper, The Gleaner, with a French section called, Le Gleaner. It was founded in 1863 by Robert Sellar (1841-1919) under the banner Canadian Gleaner, changing its name to the Huntington Gleaner in 1912. The Huntingdon Gleaner was owned by various family businesses for most of its history. Even though it was technically a private business, local ownership conveyed the title of ‘community newspaper’ as is typical across Canada. Eventually, the Huntingdon Gleaner added a French language section in 1993 called La Source (back-to-back format) and became known as The Gleaner/La Source. As consolidation in the print media began at the turn of this century, The Gleaner/La Source was sold by the local owner to what became a series of re-sales to various media chains: Les Hebdos Montérégiens in 1985, Quebecor in 2011 and finally Transcontinental in 2013. In 2015, The Gleaner/La Source ceased publication as a standalone newspaper, with The Gleaner becoming an 8-page insert in the regional free-distribution weekly Le Journal St-Francois (Valleyfield), and La Source being closed completely. In 2017, Transcontinental sold Le Journal St-Francois (including The Gleaner) to a regional media company, Gravité Média. In 2018, Gravité Média reached out to the English-speaking community in the Châteauguay Valley to see if there was any interest in acquiring the title. Rather than simply close The Gleaner, Gravité Média wanted to respect the heritage integral to the publication and provide the opportunity for the English-speaking community to continue to be served by a community newspaper. In November 2018, a public meeting was held in Ormstown, along with representatives from Gravité Média, to discuss the possibilities surrounding the community acquiring the rights to continue publishing The Gleaner.

From that meeting, a “Future of the Gleaner” steering committee was formed, followed shortly by the establishment of a non-profit organization the Chateauguay Valley Community Information Services and discussions were held with Gravité Media to acquire the assets of The Gleaner (title, web domain, etc.) and a transfer agreement was signed in May 2019. In June 2019, The Gleaner was re-launched with a souvenir print version and a new website, followed by monthly editions in August, September, October and November 2019 and a fortnightly edition stating in January 2020.

== See also ==
- Electoral district
- List of anglophone communities in Quebec
- List of cities in Quebec
