= Serge Deslières =

Canadian politician (1947–2020)

MNA for Salaberry-Soulanges
- In office 1994–2003
- Preceded by: Serge Marcil
- Succeeded by: riding dissolved

MNA for Beauharnois
- In office 2003 – November 5, 2008
- Preceded by: first member
- Succeeded by: Guy Leclair

Personal details
- Born: April 14, 1947 Montreal, Quebec
- Died: March 4, 2020 (aged 72)
- Party: Parti Québécois
- Spouse: Irene Couture
- Profession: teacher

Serge Deslières (April 14, 1947 – March 4, 2020) was a Quebec politician and teacher. He was the Member of National Assembly of Quebec for the riding of Beauharnois in the Montérégie region south of Montreal. He represented the Parti Québécois and was a member of the party since 1969 and MNA from 1994 to 2008.

Deslières was born in Montreal. He went to the Université de Montréal and obtained a bachelor's degree in remedial education in 1979. Deslières was a teacher from 1970 to 1994 and was councillor and executive member for the Commission Scolaire de Valleyfield. From 1987 to 1994, he was the mayor of the municipality of Grande-Ile. He was also administration member of the MRC Beauharnois-Salaberry. He was also part of associations promoting economic development and employment and the region. While a member of the Parti Québécois since 1969, he was the vice-president and president of the executive council of the PQ in Beauharnois and was a member of the Quebec sovereignty movement in the late 1960s and early 1970s.

Deslières entered politics and was elected in Salaberry-Soulanges in 1994 and re-elected in 1998 as the Parti Québécois was in power from 1994 to 2003 under the leadership of Jacques Parizeau, Lucien Bouchard and Bernard Landry. He was named from 2001 to 2003, the Parliamentary Secretary for the Minister of Transport. He was re-elected in 2003 and 2007 and served in his third mandate as critic for transport. In his final mandate he served as the PQ critic in leisure and sport before being named the critic for roads and public transit. He did not run for re-election in 2008.
