= Moïse Plante =

Canadian politician

Member of the Legislative Assembly of Quebec for Beauharnois
- In office 1892–1892
- Preceded by: Élie-Hercule Bisson
- Succeeded by: Élie-Hercule Bisson

Personal details
- Born: c. 1830
- Died: March 18, 1892 Salaberry-de-Valleyfield, Quebec
- Party: Conservative
- Children: Arthur Plante

Moïse Plante (c. 1830 – March 18, 1892) was a merchant and political figure in Quebec. He represented Beauharnois in the Legislative Assembly of Quebec in 1892 as a Conservative member.

He was the son of Arthur Plante. Plante served as mayor of Valleyfield from 1875 to 1878 and from 1880 to 1889. He married Hermine Bergevin. Plante was elected to the Quebec assembly in 1892 but died at Valleyfield without ever taking his seat.

His son Arthur and his nephews Célestin Bergevin and Achille Bergevin were also elected to represent Beauharnois in the Quebec assembly.
