= Bergevin =

Bergevin or De Bergevin is a surname. Notable people with the surname include:

- Achille Bergevin (1870–1933), Canadian politician from Quebec
- Célestin Bergevin (1832–1910), farmer and political figure in Quebec
- Édouard de Bergevin (1861–1925), French painter of the Rouen school
- Marc Bergevin (born 1965), Canadian ice hockey player and executive

== See also ==
- The Bergevin Brothers, American Seattle-based band
