= Saint Charles River (Valleyfield) =

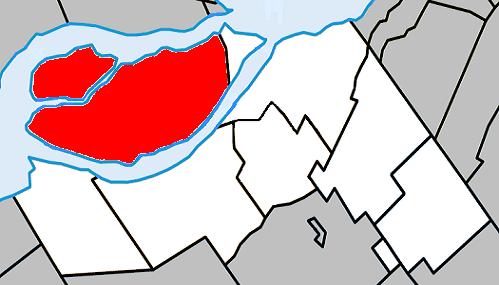
- Map of the Rivière Saint-Charles/Salaberry-de-Valleyfield
- Native name: Rivière Saint-Charles (French)

Location
- Country: Canada
- Province: Quebec

Physical characteristics
- Source
  - location: Lake Saint Francis
  - coordinates: 45°15′20″N 74°09′05″W
  - elevation: 250 m (820 ft)
- Mouth
  - location: Lake Saint-Louis
  - coordinates: 45°17′36″N 74°02′20″W
- Length: 25 km (16 mi)
- Discharge
  - average: 30 m^{3}/s (1,059.44 cu ft/s)

The Saint Charles River (French: Rivière Saint-Charles) is a branch of the Saint Lawrence River that starts in Salaberry-de-Valleyfield, Quebec, Canada. The river divides the Grande-Île and the Island of Salaberry, which are located approximately 50 km east of Montreal. The river is 8 km long, and drops 24m over its course from Lake Saint Francis east to Lake Saint-Louis.

== Geography ==
The Saint Charles River is not a distinct river unto itself, it is in reality an arm of the Saint Lawrence River. The river originates at the end of Lake Saint Francis at Salaberry-de-Valleyfield and passes through the town of Saint-Timothée, before entering Lake Saint Louis to the east. Originally, at the eastern end of Lake Saint Francis, there were two channels, northern channel and the Saint Charles River. Because of the presence of rapids, several canals have been built. The Old Beauharnois Canal and the Soulanges Canal, neither of which are still in use, and the Beauharnois Canal have contributed to changes in flow of the rivière Saint-Charles. Historically, it has been a significant source of hydroelectric power for factories in Salaberry-de-Valleyfield. Much of the river's banks are developed, but a portion of its banks remain undeveloped.

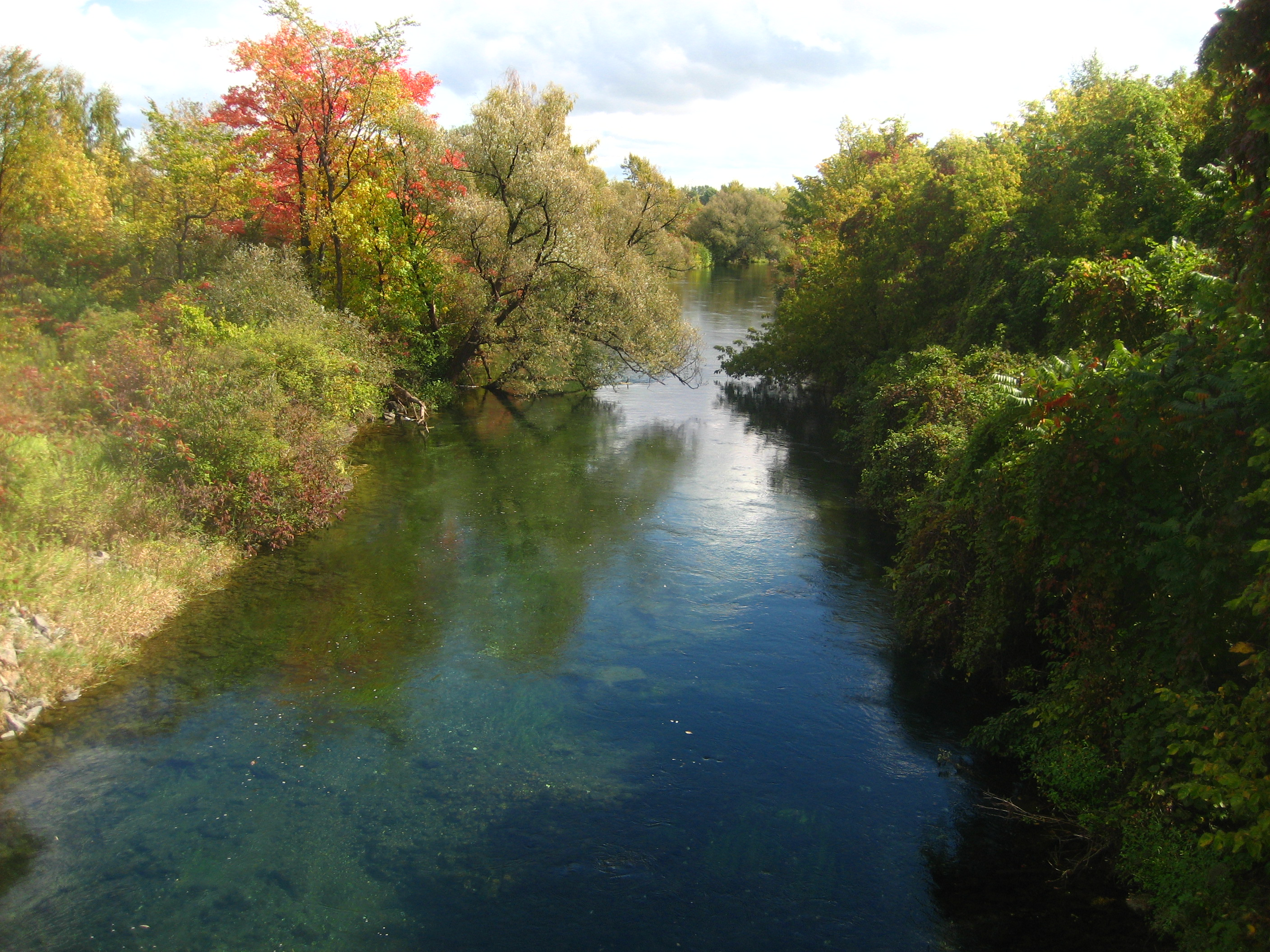
Rivière Saint-Charles looking south from the Public Works in Valleyfield, autumn, 2009

The Saint Charles River is in the physiographic region of the Saint Lawrence Lowlands. The bedrock of the region is a slightly dipping limestone, but glacial deposits define the landscape. Deep, arable soils lie across this flat plain, which rarely exceeds 200m above sea level. Before extensive logging and development, the Saint Lawrence Lowlands were a mix of mostly forest and wetlands. However, they now remain primarily as isolated fragments. The region between Lake Saint Francis and Lake Saint Louis originally supported a diverse fluvial environment which has now been transformed into a slow-moving lacustrine one. The Saint Charles River is one area that has not been significantly dammed but still has seen a large degradation of habitat. The Saint Lawrence Lowlands is also the most urbanized ecozone in Canada, holding most of Canada's population and manufacturing jobs. The Saint Charles River has developed considerably in terms of agriculture and industry. A sizable portion of the river is residentially owned, which is typical of many rivers in the region. Only 15% of the natural shoreline in the area remains today. The municipal government of Valleyfield recently purchased a portion of the river, and has halted development on it for the time being.

=== Fish migration ===
Because of extensive damming of the Saint Lawrence, several fish species are left without sufficient areas to migrate up and downstream. Many fish species are able to migrate easily downstream through the Beauharnois Dam. However, several species, such as the eel and lake sturgeon, are not able to survive the turbines of the dam. Because it has only one small dam at its mouth, it is an important spot for up and downstream fish migration. A fish ladder was put in place to allow for more ease of migration. Data has shown that the pass has worked for some species, such as the cyprinidae.

== History ==
Before industrial development, the river and surrounding areas were used mostly as agricultural land by the Iroquois and European colonists. In the mid 19th century, the river was recognised for its hydroelectric potential and factories began to be built in the region. The old Beauharnois Canal was created in 1849 and its power was harnessed by a saw mill, Valleyfield Mills, which was Canada's largest supplier of paper for newspapers at the time. Thus, there is a long history of factory placement along the Saint Charles River and the old Beauharnois Canal. During the period of heavy industrialization along its banks, the health of the river was largely neglected. After the creation of the first Beauharnois Canal in 1849, the river was dammed at its mouth to regulate its flow. Until the 1970s the flow of the river was kept very low as to allow the maximum flow possible through the other canals. However, an accumulation of waste in the river from factories along its banks began to pollute the river. For example, the factory Expro Inc., which produced (and still produces) chemical products such as nitroglycerine, has been accused of dumping toxic waste into the river. Long after continuous dumping had started, an agreement was reached between Hydro Quebec and the City of Salaberry-de-Valleyfield to increase the flow of the river to 30m^{3}/s to dilute the unpleasant odours from the river. Since the 1970s, the flow of water in the river has been kept constant at 30m^{3}/s, but there has been little effort to clean the river. Several studies have shown that the water quality of the river is low, and much lower, in fact, than that of the Saint Lawrence in general. The cumulative effects of industrialization near the river and of dumping wastes have given the river a negative view in the community, and it is sometimes referred to as the "rivière des étrons" which, roughly translated, means the river of feces.

== Recreation ==
Salaberry-de-Valleyfield is a popular destination for boaters of all sorts. Sailing and motorized boating is popular on Lake Saint Francis, and there is a world class whitewater kayak course on the rivière Saint-Charles. It is located at the head of the river just as it exits Saint Francis Bay. The site was completely redesigned in 2002 for kayak paddling, and has 300m of Class I through Class III paddling. The site is especially suited for racing because the water level is controlled at the intake and is more or less constant. The 2004 Canadian Slalom Championships and the 2009 North American Under-23 Paddling Championships were held there.

== See also ==
=== Related articles ===
- Beauharnois-Salaberry Regional County Municipality
- Beauharnois Canal
- Saint Lawrence River
- List of rivers of Quebec
