= Arthur Plante =

Canadian politician

Member of the Legislative Assembly of Quebec for Beauharnois
- In office 1898–1900
- Preceded by: Élie-Hercule Bisson
- Succeeded by: Achille Bergevin
- In office 1908–1912
- Preceded by: Achille Bergevin
- Succeeded by: Edmund Arthur Robert
- In office 1923–1927
- Preceded by: Achille Bergevin
- Succeeded by: Louis-Joseph Papineau

Personal details
- Born: September 29, 1869 Salaberry-de-Valleyfield, Quebec
- Died: January 31, 1927 (aged 57) Salaberry-de-Valleyfield, Quebec
- Party: Conservative

Arthur Plante, KC (September 29, 1869 – January 31, 1927) was a lawyer and political figure in Quebec. He represented Beauharnois in the Legislative Assembly of Quebec from 1898 to 1900, from 1908 to 1912, and from 1923 to 1927 as a Conservative member.

He was born in Salaberry-de-Valleyfield, Quebec, the son of Moïse Plante and Hermine Bergevin, and was educated in Valleyfield at the Jesuit College in Montreal and at the Université Laval. Plante articled in law, was admitted to the Quebec bar in 1894, and practised in the Montreal and Beauharnois regions. In 1909, he was named King's Counsel. Plante was president of the Valleyfield Chamber of Commerce. He was first elected to the Quebec assembly in an 1898 by-election held after Élie-Hercule Bisson accepted an appointment as prothonotary. Plante was defeated when he ran for reelection in 1900 and 1904. Reelected in 1908, he was defeated in 1912. He was elected again in 1923 and died in office at Salaberry-de-Valleyfield at the age of 57.

His cousins, Achille Bergevin and Célestin Bergevin, also represented Beauharnois in the Quebec assembly.
