= Saint-Charles River =

Saint-Charles River may refer to:

- Saint-Charles River (Quebec City), stream in Québec City, Quebec, Canada
- Saint-Charles River (Varennes), stream in Varennes, Quebec, Canada
- Saint-Charles River (Valleyfield), stream in Salaberry-de-Valleyfield, Quebec, Canada
- Saint Charles River (Colorado), tributary of the Arkansas River in the state of Colorado in the United States
