= Célestin Bergevin =

Canadian politician

Member of the Legislative Assembly of Quebec for Beauharnois
- In office 1867–1871
- Succeeded by: George-Étienne Cartier
- In office 1878–1886
- Preceded by: Élie-Hercule Bisson
- Succeeded by: Moïse Plante

Personal details
- Born: September 7, 1832 Saint-Timothée, Lower Canada
- Died: July 17, 1910 (aged 77) Salaberry-de-Valleyfield, Quebec
- Party: Conservative
- Relations: Achille Bergevin, cousin Arthur Plante, cousin Moïse Plante, uncle

Célestin Bergevin (September 7, 1832 – July 17, 1910) was a farmer and political figure in Quebec. He represented Beauharnois in the Legislative Assembly of Quebec from 1867 to 1871 and from 1878 to 1886 as a Conservative member.

He was born in Saint-Timothée, Lower Canada, the son of Pierre Bergevin and Angélique Mercier. Bergevin was mayor of Saint-Clément-de-Beauharnois from 1878 to 1882. He was also a justice of the peace and harbour master for Valleyfield. In 1857, he married Marie Salomae May. Bergevin was defeated by George-Étienne Cartier when he ran for reelection in 1871, also losing by-elections in 1873 and 1875. He was successful in 1878 and 1881 but defeated again in 1886. Bergevin died in Salaberry-de-Valleyfield at the age of 77.

His cousins Achille Bergevin and Arthur Plante, and his uncle Moïse Plante were also elected to represent Beauharnois in the Quebec assembly.
