= Alexandre Daneau =

Alexandre Daneau MNA

Member of the National Assembly for Beauharnois
- Incumbent
- Assumed office October 5, 2026
- Preceded by: Claude Reid

Personal details
- Party: Parti Québécois

Alexandre Daneau is a Canadian politician who is a candidate for the National Assembly of Quebec for Beauharnois in the 2026 Quebec general election as a member of the Parti Québécois.

Daneau is a graduate of the Collège de Valleyfield and the Conservatoire d'art dramatique de Montréal, and was a stage actor for almost 20 years.
