= Claude Reid =

Canadian politician

Member of the National Assembly of Quebec for Beauharnois
- In office October 1, 2018 – August 27, 2026
- Preceded by: Guy Leclair
- Succeeded by: Alexandre Daneau

Personal details
- Born: 1964 Valleyfield, Quebec
- Party: Coalition Avenir Québec

Claude Reid is a Canadian politician, who was elected to the National Assembly of Quebec in the 2018 provincial election. He represented the electoral district of Beauharnois as a member of the Coalition Avenir Québec.

He served on municipal council from 1999 to 2007.

== Electoral record ==
2026 Quebec general election: Beauharnois
** Preliminary results — Not yet official **
Party	Candidate	Votes	%	±%
Parti Québécois	Alexandre Daneau	17,913	44.87	+28.22
Coalition Avenir Québec	Claude Reid	7,674	19.22	–35.01
Conservative	Angélika Homère	6,230	15.61	+6.20
Liberal	Charles Royer Tremblay	5,022	12.58	+6.65
Québec solidaire	Virginie Helene Hockers	2,536	6.35	–6.38
Green	Charmaine Carvalho	393	0.98	+0.25
Démocratie directe	Karine Pelletier	154	0.39	N/A
Total valid votes		39,922	98.07	–0.36
Total rejected ballots		787	1.93	+0.36
Turnout		40,709	67.89	+1.56
Electors on the lists		59,965		
Parti Québécois gain from Coalition Avenir Québec		Swing		+31.62
Source: Élections Québec

2022 Quebec general election: Beauharnois
Party	Candidate	Votes	%	±%
Coalition Avenir Québec	Claude Reid	17,882	53.78	+7.08
Parti Québécois	Claudine Desforges	5,640	16.96	-4.90
Québec solidaire	Emilie Poirier	4,299	12.93	-2.12
Conservative	Chantal Dauphinais	3,112	9.36	+8.46
Liberal	Marc Blanchard	1,940	5.83	-6.88
Green	Hélène Savard	243	0.73	–
Climat Québec	Mathieu Taillefer	136	0.41	–
Total valid votes		33,252	98.43	
Total rejected ballots		530	1.57	
Turnout		33,782	66.33	-2.29
Electors on the lists		50,930		
Coalition Avenir Québec hold		Swing		–

2018 Quebec general election: Beauharnois
Party	Candidate	Votes	%	±%
Coalition Avenir Québec	Claude Reid	14,947	46.7	+23.72
Parti Québécois	Mireille Théorêt	6,995	21.86	-16.97
Québec solidaire	Pierre-Paul St-Onge	4,816	15.05	+8.17
Liberal	Félix Rhéaume	4,069	12.71	-15.38
New Democratic	François Mantion	459	1.43	
Citoyens au pouvoir	Tommy Mathieu	429	1.34	+0.24
Conservative	Yannick Campeau	288	0.9	
Total valid votes		32,003	97.84	
Total rejected ballots		706	2.16	
Turnout		32,709	68.62	
Eligible voters		47,666		
Coalition Avenir Québec gain from Parti Québécois		Swing		+20.35
Source(s) "Rapport des résultats officiels du scrutin". Élections Québec.
