= Guy Leclair =

Canadian politician (born 1968)

Member of the National Assembly of Quebec for Beauharnois
- In office December 8, 2008 – August 29, 2018
- Preceded by: Serge Deslières
- Succeeded by: Claude Reid

Personal details
- Born: May 9, 1968 (age 58) Salaberry-de-Valleyfield, Quebec, Canada
- Party: Parti Québécois
- Occupation: mechanic, technician, businessman

Guy Leclair (born May 9, 1968) is a Canadian politician. Leclair was elected on December 8, 2008, to represent the riding of Beauharnois in the National Assembly of Quebec in the 2008 provincial election. He is a member of the Parti Québécois.

Born in Salaberry-de-Valleyfield, Quebec, Leclair worked in the Canadian Armed Forces as a marine mechanic in Halifax, Nova Scotia from 1986 to 1989. He obtained a college degree at the Institute Teccart in 1998 and worked as an instrumental and control technician from 1989 to 2008. He has also been owner of two businesses, including one writing promotional articles for musical groups.

Leclair was involved in sports being previously a soccer referee from 1984 to 1986, and from 1997 to 2004 a certified hockey coach for minor hockey in Valleyfield. In 2008, Leclair was elected as a municipal councillor in Salaberry-de-Valleyfield.

Leclair was first elected to represent Beauharnois in the 2008 Quebec general election, succeeding Serge Deslières as MNA.

Since the election, he has served on the "Committee on Planning and the Public Domain" and the "Committee on Labour and the Economy". In August 2010, he was named the official opposition critic for labour.

Leclair was convicted for drunk driving in 2011, and was punished with a $2000 fine and a one-year license suspension.

In 2015, Leclair was appointed the official opposition critic for labour and pension plans.

In July 2018, Leclair was arrested for drunk driving and charged for driving under the influence. Leclair said that the police report was wrong, that he was innocent and that he had not refused a breathalyzer test. PQ leader Jean-François Lisée said that Leclair would remain as a candidate for the 2018 Quebec general election.

Leclair subsequently withdrew his candidacy on September 5, 2018.
