= Delpha Sauvé =

Canadian politician (1901–1956)

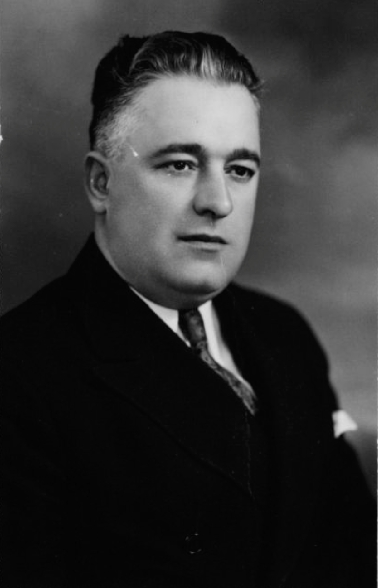

Member of the Legislative Assembly of Quebec for Beauharnois
- In office 1935–1944
- Preceded by: Gontran Saintonge
- Succeeded by: Albert Lemieux

Personal details
- Born: June 12, 1901 Saint-Louis-de-Gonzague, Quebec, Canada
- Died: October 2, 1956 (aged 55) Montreal, Quebec, Canada
- Party: Conservative

Delpha Sauvé (June 12, 1901 – October 2, 1956) was a Canadian politician. He was a Member of the Legislative Assembly of Quebec.

== Background ==
He was born near Beauharnois, Montérégie on June 12, 1901.

== Political career ==
Sauvé successfully ran as a Conservative candidate in the district of Beauharnois in the 1935 provincial election. He was re-elected as a Union Nationale candidate in the 1936 and 1939 elections, but was defeated by Bloc populaire canadien candidate Albert Lemieux in the 1944 election.

== Death ==
He died on October 2, 1956, in Montreal.
