= Élie-Hercule Bisson =

Canadian politician

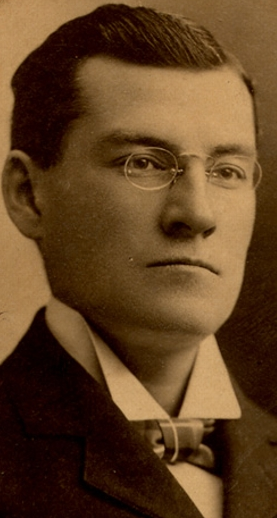

Member of the Legislative Assembly of Quebec for Beauharnois
- In office 1873–1878
- Preceded by: George-Étienne Cartier
- Succeeded by: Célestin Bergevin
- In office 1886–1892
- Preceded by: Célestin Bergevin
- Succeeded by: Moïse Plante
- In office 1892–1898
- Preceded by: Moïse Plante
- Succeeded by: Arthur Plante

Personal details
- Born: July 7, 1833 Saint-Rémi, Lower Canada
- Died: May 28, 1907 (aged 73) Beauharnois, Quebec

Élie-Hercule Bisson (July 7, 1833 – May 28, 1907) was a notary and political figure in Quebec. He represented Beauharnois in the Legislative Assembly of Quebec from 1873 to 1878, from 1886 to 1892 and from 1892 to 1889 as a Liberal member.

He was born in Saint-Rémi, Lower Canada, the son of Alexis Bisson and Esther Lonctin. Bisson was educated at the Collège de Montréal and, after articling as a notary, was admitted to practice in 1860. He practised at Saint-Louis-de-Gonzague from 1860 to 1876. In 1861, he married Virginie Rapin. He was recorder for the town of Beauharnois, secretary for Beauharnois County and served as mayor of Beauharnois in 1894 and 1895. Bisson was a director for the Beauharnois Junction Railway.

He was first elected to the Quebec assembly in an 1873 by-election held following the death of George-Étienne Cartier. Bisson was defeated when he ran for reelection in 1878. He was defeated by Moïse Plante in 1892 but then was elected in a by-election held later that year after Plante's death. In 1898, he resigned his seat to become prothonotary for Beauharnois district. He died in Beauharnois at the age of 73.
