= Beauharnois (provincial electoral district) =

Provincial electoral district in Quebec, Canada

Quebec electoral district
- Coordinates: 45.249°N 73.988°W

Provincial electoral district
- Legislature: National Assembly of Quebec
MNA
Alexandre Daneau
Parti Québécois
- District created: 1867
- District abolished: 1988
- District re-created: 2001
- First contested: 1867
- Last contested: 2026

Demographics
- Electors (2014): 46,006
- Area (km²): 428.4
- Census division: Beauharnois-Salaberry (part)
- Census subdivision(s): Beauharnois, Coteau-du-Lac, Saint-Étienne-de-Beauharnois, Saint-Louis-de-Gonzague, Saint-Stanislas-de-Kostka, Salaberry-de-Valleyfield

Beauharnois (French pronunciation: [boaʁnwa]) is a provincial electoral district in the Montérégie region of Quebec, Canada, that elects members to the National Assembly of Quebec. The district notably include the city of Salaberry-de-Valleyfield.

It was created in 2001 from parts of Beauharnois-Huntingdon, Châteauguay and Salaberry-Soulanges.

In the change from the 2001 to the 2011 electoral map, its territory was unchanged.

An earlier version of the Beauharnois electoral district had been created for the 1867 election (and an electoral district of that name existed earlier in the Legislative Assembly of the Province of Canada and the Legislative Assembly of Lower Canada). Its last election was in 1985. It disappeared in the 1989 election and its successor electoral district was Beauharnois-Huntingdon.

In 2026, it gained Coteau-du-Lac.

== Members of the Legislative Assembly / National Assembly ==
Legislature	Years	Member	Party
1st	1867–1871	Célestin Bergevin	Conservative
2nd	1871–1873†	George-Étienne Cartier	Conservative
2nd	1873–1875	Élie-Hercule Bisson	Liberal
3rd	1875–1878	Élie-Hercule Bisson	Liberal
4th	1878–1881	Célestin Bergevin	Conservative
5th	1881–1886	Célestin Bergevin	Conservative
6th	1886–1890	Élie-Hercule Bisson	Liberal
7th	1890–1892	Élie-Hercule Bisson	Liberal
8th	1892–1892†	Moïse Plante	Conservative
8th	1892–1897	Élie-Hercule Bisson	Liberal
9th	1897–1898	Élie-Hercule Bisson	Liberal
9th	1898–1900	Arthur Plante	Conservative
10th	1900–1904	Achille Bergevin	Liberal
11th	1904–1908	Achille Bergevin	Liberal
12th	1908–1912	Arthur Plante	Conservative
13th	1912–1916	Edmund Arthur Robert	Liberal
14th	1916–1919	Edmund Arthur Robert	Liberal
15th	1919–1923	Achille Bergevin	Liberal
16th	1923–1927	Arthur Plante	Conservative
17th	1927–1931	Louis-Joseph Papineau	Liberal
18th	1931–1935	Gontran Saintonge	Liberal
19th	1935–1936	Delpha Sauvé	Conservative
20th	1936–1939	Delpha Sauvé	Union Nationale
21st	1939–1944	Delpha Sauvé	Union Nationale
22nd	1944–1948	Albert Lemieux	Bloc populaire
23rd	1948–1952	Edgar Hébert	Union Nationale
24th	1952–1956	Edgar Hébert	Union Nationale
25th	1956–1960	Edgar Hébert	Union Nationale
26th	1960–1962	Edgar Hébert	Union Nationale
27th	1962–1966	Gérard Cadieux	Liberal
28th	1966–1970	Gérard Cadieux	Liberal
29th	1970–1973	Gérard Cadieux	Liberal
30th	1973–1976	Gérard Cadieux	Liberal
31st	1976–1981	Laurent Lavigne	Parti Québécois
32nd	1981–1985	Laurent Lavigne	Parti Québécois
33rd	1985–1989	Serge Marcil	Liberal
Riding dissolved into Beauharnois-Huntingdon
Riding re-created from Beauharnois-Huntingdon
37th	2003–2007	Serge Deslières	Parti Québécois
38th	2007–2008	Serge Deslières	Parti Québécois
39th	2008–2012	Guy Leclair	Parti Québécois
40th	2012–2014	Guy Leclair	Parti Québécois
41st	2014–2018	Guy Leclair	Parti Québécois
42nd	2018–2022	Claude Reid	Coalition Avenir Québec
43rd	2022–2026	Claude Reid	Coalition Avenir Québec
44th	2026–Present	Alexandre Daneau	Parti Québécois

== Election results ==
2026 Quebec general election
** Preliminary results — Not yet official **
Party	Candidate	Votes	%	±%
Parti Québécois	Alexandre Daneau	17,913	44.87	+28.22
Coalition Avenir Québec	Claude Reid	7,674	19.22	–35.01
Conservative	Angélika Homère	6,230	15.61	+6.20
Liberal	Charles Royer Tremblay	5,022	12.58	+6.65
Québec solidaire	Virginie Helene Hockers	2,536	6.35	–6.38
Green	Charmaine Carvalho	393	0.98	+0.25
Démocratie directe	Karine Pelletier	154	0.39	N/A
Total valid votes		39,922	98.07	–0.36
Total rejected ballots		787	1.93	+0.36
Turnout		40,709	67.89	+1.56
Electors on the lists		59,965		
Parti Québécois gain from Coalition Avenir Québec		Swing		+31.62
Source: Élections Québec

2022 Quebec general election redistributed results
Party	Vote	%
Coalition Avenir Québec	19,568	54.23
Parti Québécois	6,009	16.65
Québec solidaire	4,595	12.73
Conservative	3,397	9.41
Liberal	2,139	5.93
Others	377	1.04

2022 Quebec general election
Party	Candidate	Votes	%	±%
Coalition Avenir Québec	Claude Reid	17,882	53.78	+7.08
Parti Québécois	Claudine Desforges	5,640	16.96	-4.90
Québec solidaire	Emilie Poirier	4,299	12.93	-2.12
Conservative	Chantal Dauphinais	3,112	9.36	+8.46
Liberal	Marc Blanchard	1,940	5.83	-6.88
Green	Hélène Savard	243	0.73	–
Climat Québec	Mathieu Taillefer	136	0.41	–
Total valid votes		33,252	98.43	
Total rejected ballots		530	1.57	
Turnout		33,782	66.33	-2.29
Electors on the lists		50,930		
Coalition Avenir Québec hold		Swing		–

2018 Quebec general election
Party	Candidate	Votes	%	±%
Coalition Avenir Québec	Claude Reid	14,947	46.7	+23.72
Parti Québécois	Mireille Théorêt	6,995	21.86	-16.97
Québec solidaire	Pierre-Paul St-Onge	4,816	15.05	+8.17
Liberal	Félix Rhéaume	4,069	12.71	-15.38
New Democratic	François Mantion	459	1.43	
Citoyens au pouvoir	Tommy Mathieu	429	1.34	+0.24
Conservative	Yannick Campeau	288	0.9	
Total valid votes		32,003	97.84	
Total rejected ballots		706	2.16	
Turnout		32,709	68.62	
Eligible voters		47,666		
Coalition Avenir Québec gain from Parti Québécois		Swing		+20.35
Source(s) "Rapport des résultats officiels du scrutin". Élections Québec.

2014 Quebec general election
Party	Candidate	Votes	%	±%
Parti Québécois	Guy Leclair	11,891	38.83	-6.33
Liberal	Lyse Lemieux	8,601	28.09	+7.59
Coalition Avenir Québec	Claude Moreau	7,035	22.98	-2.71
Québec solidaire	Pierre-Paul St-Onge	2,106	6.88	+2.91
Conservative	Julie De Bellefeuille	337	1.10	+0.54
Green	Victoria Haliburton	278	0.91	-0.62
Option nationale	Florence Rousseau	183	0.60	-0.94
Independent	Sylvain Larocque	111	0.36	+0.11
Parti équitable	Yves de Repentigny	78	0.25	–
Total valid votes		30,620	97.94	–
Total rejected ballots		645	2.06	–
Turnout		31,265	67.96%	–
Electors on the lists		46,006	–	–

2012 Quebec general election
Party	Candidate	Votes	%	±%
Parti Québécois	Guy Leclair	15,117	45.16	-1.99
Coalition Avenir Québec	Michel Drouin	8,599	25.69*	+13.05
Liberal	Lyse Lemieux	6,861	20.50	-13.14
Québec solidaire	Pierre-Paul St-Onge	1,328	3.97	+1.91
Option nationale	Jérémie Poupart Montpetit	515	1.54	–
Green	Bruno Auclair	512	1.53	-1.83
Independent	Mathieu Bonin	269	0.80	–
Conservative	Lynne Mimeault	188	0.56	–
Independent	Sylvain Larocque	84	0.25	–
Total valid votes		33,473	98.52	–
Total rejected ballots		502	1.48	–
Turnout		33,975	75.07%	-
Electors on the lists		45,260	–	–

* Result compared to Action démocratique

2008 Quebec general election
Party		Candidate	Votes	%	±%
	Parti Québécois	Guy Leclair	12,349	47.15	
	Liberal	Louis-Charles Roy	8,811	33.64	
	Action démocratique	Michael Betts	3,311	12.64	
	Québec solidaire	Maxime Larue-Bourdages	681	2.6	
	Green	Stephanie Theoret	570	2.18	–
}	Independent	Christian Grenon	467	1.78	

2007 Quebec general election
Party	Candidate	Votes	%	±%
Parti Québécois	Serge Deslières	12,967	41.08	
Action démocratique	Michael Betts	9,262	29.34	
Liberal	Jean-Guy Hudon	7,679	24.32	
Green	Eric Desormeaux	1,061	3.36	–
Québec solidaire	Normand Perry	600	1.90	

2003 Quebec general election
Party	Candidate	Votes	%	±%
Parti Québécois	Serge Deslières	13,904	44.83	
Liberal	Mario Faubert	13,265	42.77	
Action démocratique	Michael Betts	3,338	10.76	
Green	Rémi Pelletier	506	1.63	–

== See also ==
- List of Quebec provincial electoral districts
- Canadian provincial electoral districts
