= Albert Lemieux =

Canadian politician (1916–2003)

Albert Lemieux (1916-2003) was a politician and business person in Quebec, Canada.

== Background ==
He was born on April 23, 1916, in Saint-Stanislas-de-Kostka, Quebec and was an attorney.

== Political career ==
Lemieux ran as a Bloc Populaire Canadien candidate in the provincial district of Beauharnois in the 1944 election and won against Union Nationale incumbent Delpha Sauvé. He did not run for re-election in the 1948 election.

== Retirement ==
He was appointed judge in 1966 and served in that capacity until 1970. He died on August 12, 2003.

== Footnotes ==
National Assembly of Quebec
| Preceded by Delpha Sauvé (Union Nationale) | MLA for Beauharnois; 1944–1948 | Succeeded by Edgar Hébert (Union Nationale) |
