= George-Étienne Cartier =

Canadian Father of Confederation (1814–1873)

The Honourable Sir George-Étienne Cartier Bt PC
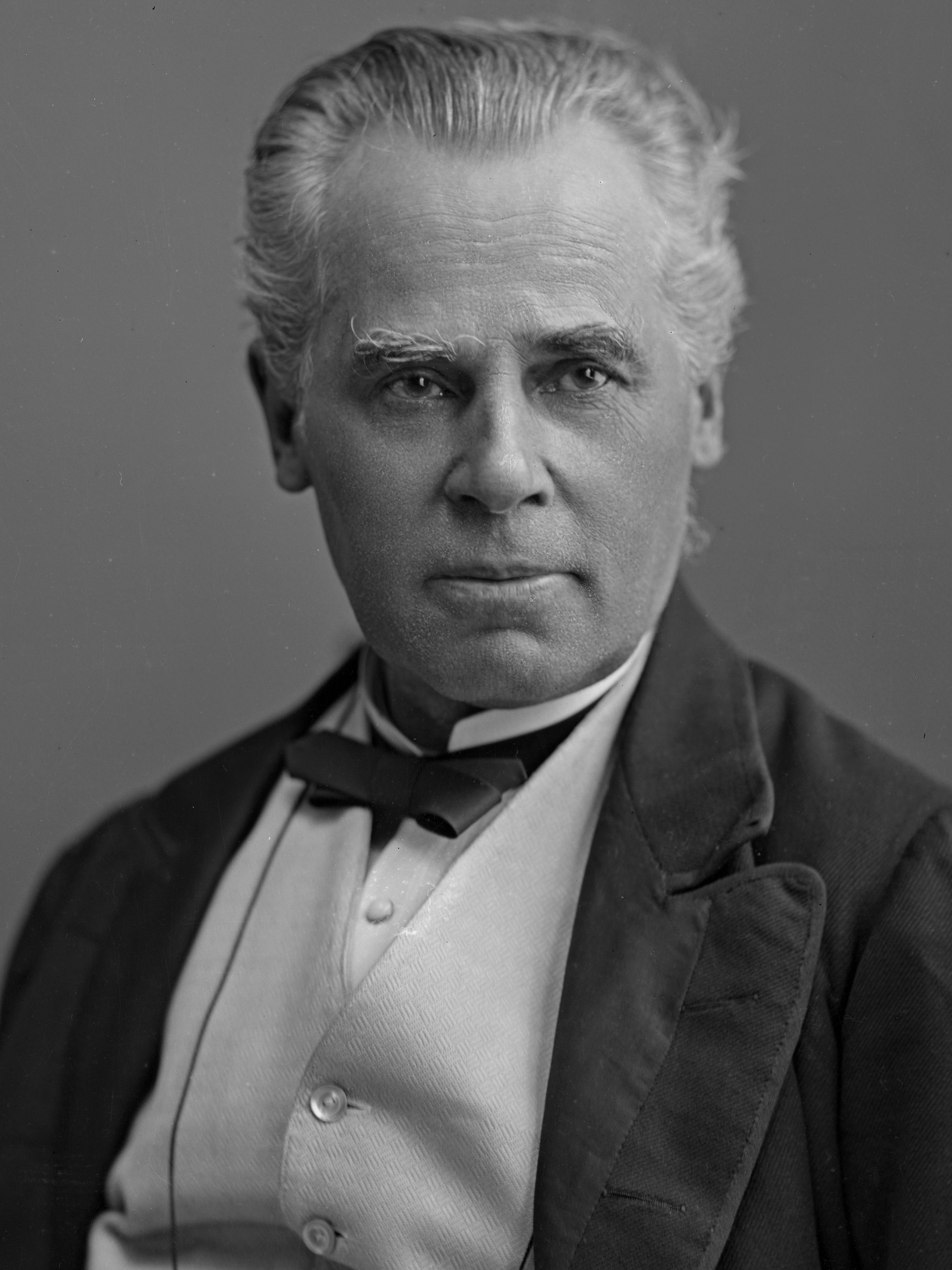
- Cartier in 1871

Co-premier from Canada East
- In office August 6, 1858 – May 24, 1862 Serving with John A. Macdonald
- Monarch: Victoria
- Governors-General: Edmund Walker Head; The Viscount Monck
- Preceded by: Antoine-Aimé Dorion
- Succeeded by: Louis-Victor Sicotte
- In office November 26, 1857 – August 2, 1858 Serving with John A. Macdonald
- Monarch: Victoria
- Governor-General: Edmund Walker Head
- Preceded by: Étienne-Paschal Taché
- Succeeded by: Antoine-Aimé Dorion

Minister of Militia and Defence
- In office July 1, 1867 – May 20, 1873
- Prime Minister: John A. Macdonald
- Preceded by: John A. Macdonald
- Succeeded by: Hugh McDonald
Parliamentary constituencies
Member of Parliament
In office October 12, 1872 – May 20, 1873
| Constituency | Provencher |
| Preceded by | Pierre Delorme |
| Succeeded by | Louis Riel |
In office September 20, 1867 – October 12, 1872
| Constituency | Montreal East |
| Preceded by | district established |
| Succeeded by | Louis-Amable Jetté |
Member of the Legislative Assembly of Quebec
In office July 1871 – May 20, 1873
| Constituency | Beauharnois |
| Preceded by | Célestin Bergevin |
| Succeeded by | Élie-Hercule Bisson |
In office September 1, 1867 – July 1871
| Constituency | Montréal-Est |
| Preceded by | district established |
| Succeeded by | Ferdinand-Conon David |
Member of the Legislative Assembly of the Province of Canada
In office June 1861 – July 1, 1867
| Constituency | Montreal East |
| Preceded by | district established |
| Succeeded by | assembly abolished |
In office 1848 – June 1861
| Constituency | Verchères |
| Preceded by | James Leslie |
| Succeeded by | Alexandre-Édouard Kierzkowski |

Personal details
- Born: September 6, 1814 Saint-Antoine-sur-Richelieu, Lower Canada
- Died: May 20, 1873 (aged 58) London, England
- Resting place: Notre Dame des Neiges Cemetery, Montreal
- Party: Conservative (Canada); Conservative (Quebec)
- Other political affiliations: Parti bleu (1854–1867); Patriote (until 1854)
- Spouse: Hortense Fabre
- Profession: Lawyer
- Nickname: "Kingpin of Confederation"

Military service
- Allegiance: Parti patriote; Republic of Lower Canada
- Branch/service: Société des Fils de la Liberté
- Years of service: 1837–1838
- Battles/wars: Lower Canada Rebellion: Battle of St-Denis

Sir George-Étienne Cartier, 1st Baronet (pronounced [ʒɔʁʒ etjɛn kaʁtje]; September 6, 1814 – May 20, 1873) was a Canadian statesman and Father of Confederation. He was named George, rather than the typical French, "Georges", in honour of King George III.

In the years leading up to Confederation, Cartier was a dominant figure in the politics of Canada East as leader of the Parti bleu. In 1838, he returned to Montreal after a year in exile for his role in the Lower Canada Rebellion. He officially entered politics in 1848. During his long career, he instituted the creation of the Civil Code of Lower Canada, replacing the increasingly out-dated Custom of Paris, which had been used in Lower Canada since it had been a French colony. He also promoted the introduction of primary education in the province. Cartier had several reasons for supporting Confederation, notably his fear of American expansion. He died in London, England, on May 20, 1873. Cartier is considered to be one of the most important of the Fathers of Confederation, along with John A. Macdonald and George Brown. He has been dubbed the "Kingpin of Confederation" because of his prominence.

== Early career ==
George-Étienne Cartier was born on September 6, 1814, in Saint-Antoine-sur-Richelieu, Lower Canada (now Quebec). Cartier attended the Petit Séminaire de Montréal from 1824 to 1832. He was called to the bar in 1834 where he began to practise his profession. He was also involved in the railway business, and Grand Trunk Railway was one of his legal clients.

Early in his career, Cartier was inspired by Louis-Joseph Papineau. Through this connection, Cartier became a member of the Société des Fils de la Liberté ("Society of the Sons of Liberty") and took part in the Lower Canada Rebellion of 1837 at the Battle of Saint-Denis. For his part in the uprising, Cartier was exiled and he took temporary refuge in Vermont (resided in Plattsburgh and Burlington from May to October 1838). However, he was allowed to return to Montreal in 1838 to resume his law practice.

On his return to Lower Canada in 1838, which was now Canada East of the Province of Canada, Cartier resumed his law practice. He was a member of the Saint-Jean-Baptiste Society and became active in politics as campaign manager of Louis-Hippolyte Lafontaine. In 1848, Cartier gave up his law practice and ran for office as a Reformer and was elected to the Legislative Assembly of the Province of Canada.

During his time in the Union parliament, Cartier introduced a bill in 1852 for the creation of the Grand Trunk Railway Company of Canada. In 1854 Cartier was appointed to cabinet. From 1857 to 1862 he served alongside John A. Macdonald as co-premier of the united province. Cartier was a loyal friend of Macdonald, with whom he created the Great Coalition with George Brown in 1864. The purpose of the Great Coalition was to end the political instability in the province, which had six governments in as many years.

The Great Coalition was one of the first steps in the movement towards Confederation. He attended all three of the conferences convened for this purpose: Charlottetown, Quebec, and London. Cartier was largely responsible for gaining French-Canadian support for the union.

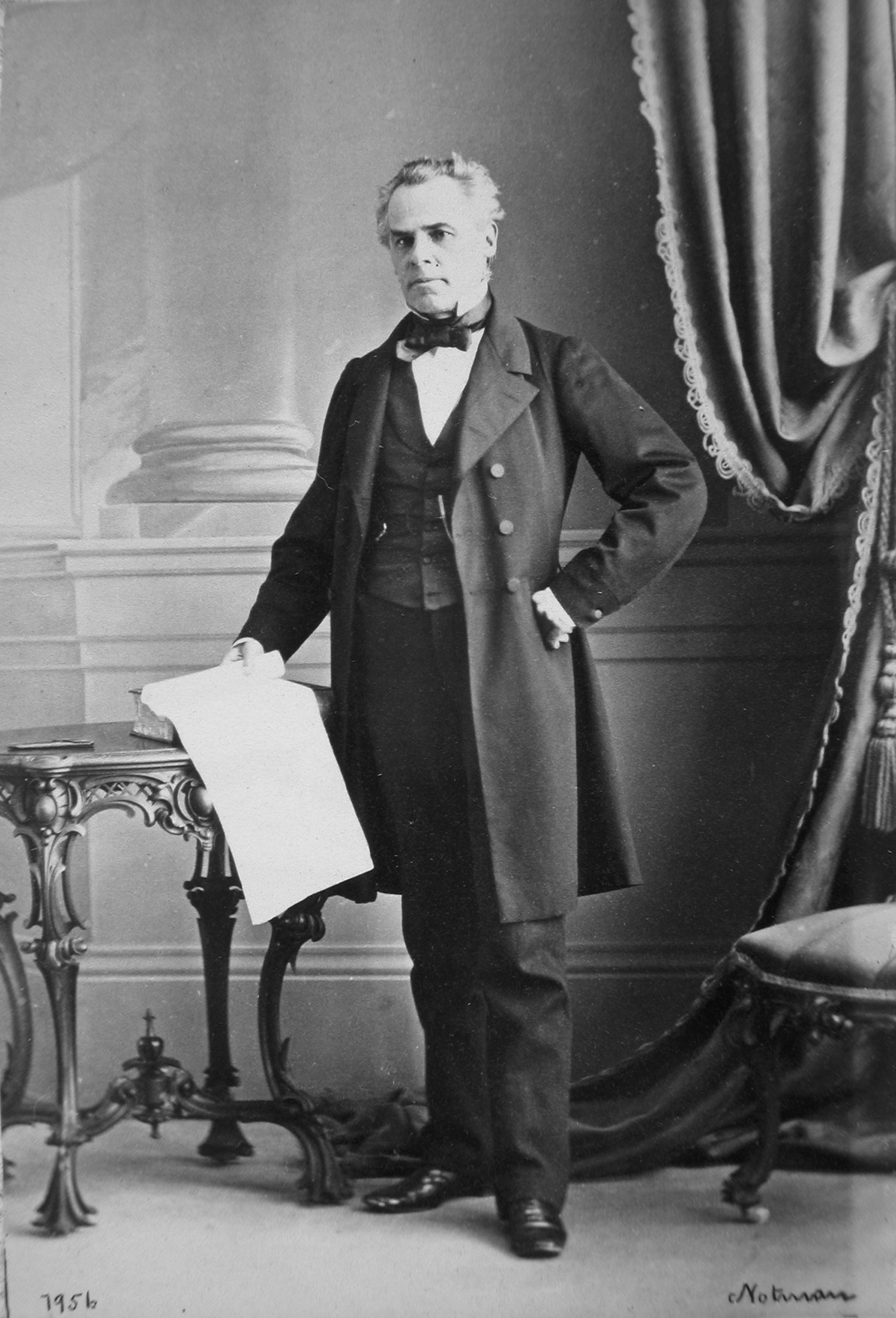
Hon. George Étienne Cartier taken at William Notman's studio in Montreal in 1863.

Cartier also played a leading role in pushing through legislative reform that effectively abolished the semi-feudal seigneurial system of land ownership in Lower Canada, turning its legislative council into an elected body of representatives, and pushed successfully for the adoption of the Civil Code within the province.

== Political life in Dominion of Canada ==
Upon the creation of the Dominion of Canada in 1867, Macdonald became prime minister, and Cartier was his Minister of Militia and Defence. As the law of the time allowed a dual mandate in both the federal and provincial governments, Cartier ran in the 1867 Quebec provincial election in Montréal-Est electoral district. Cartier was elected as a Conservative supporter of the Pierre-Joseph-Olivier Chauveau government. As a result, Cartier was both a member of the Parliament of Canada and the Legislative Assembly of Quebec.

Federally, Cartier represented Montreal East following the conclusion of Canada's first election on 20 September 1867. At the next federal election in August 1872, he was defeated by Louis-Amable Jetté while seeking a second term in Montreal East in the face of the Pacific Scandal. The following month Cartier was acclaimed the victor in the Manitoba riding of Provencher after Louis Riel and Henry James Clarke resigned as candidates there.

Notably, Cartier had intended to support an amnesty for Riel for his role in setting up a Provisional government in the Northwest, but that the Conservative government reneged on its promise to secure amnesty for the Métis leader, who was Cartier's maternal fifth cousin, twice removed. Both were descended from Canadian pioneer Zacharie Cloutier and Xainte Dupont (c. 1596 – 1680) who had, in 1634, immigrated to New France in the first wave of the Percheron Immigration from the former province of Perche, to an area that, today, is part of Quebec, Canada. He settled in Beauport and founded one of the foremost families of Quebec.

During his tenure in Ottawa, Cartier was responsible for the negotiations with Britain and the Hudson's Bay Company for the purchase of Rupert's Land and the North-Western Territory by Canada. Cartier was also an active participant in the negotiations that led to the creation of the province of Manitoba and the entry of British Columbia into Confederation. In keeping with his ties to the railways, Cartier in 1872 introduced a bill for the creation of the Canadian Pacific Railway. From 1867 to 1873, he was the Minister of Militia and Defence.

== Illness ==
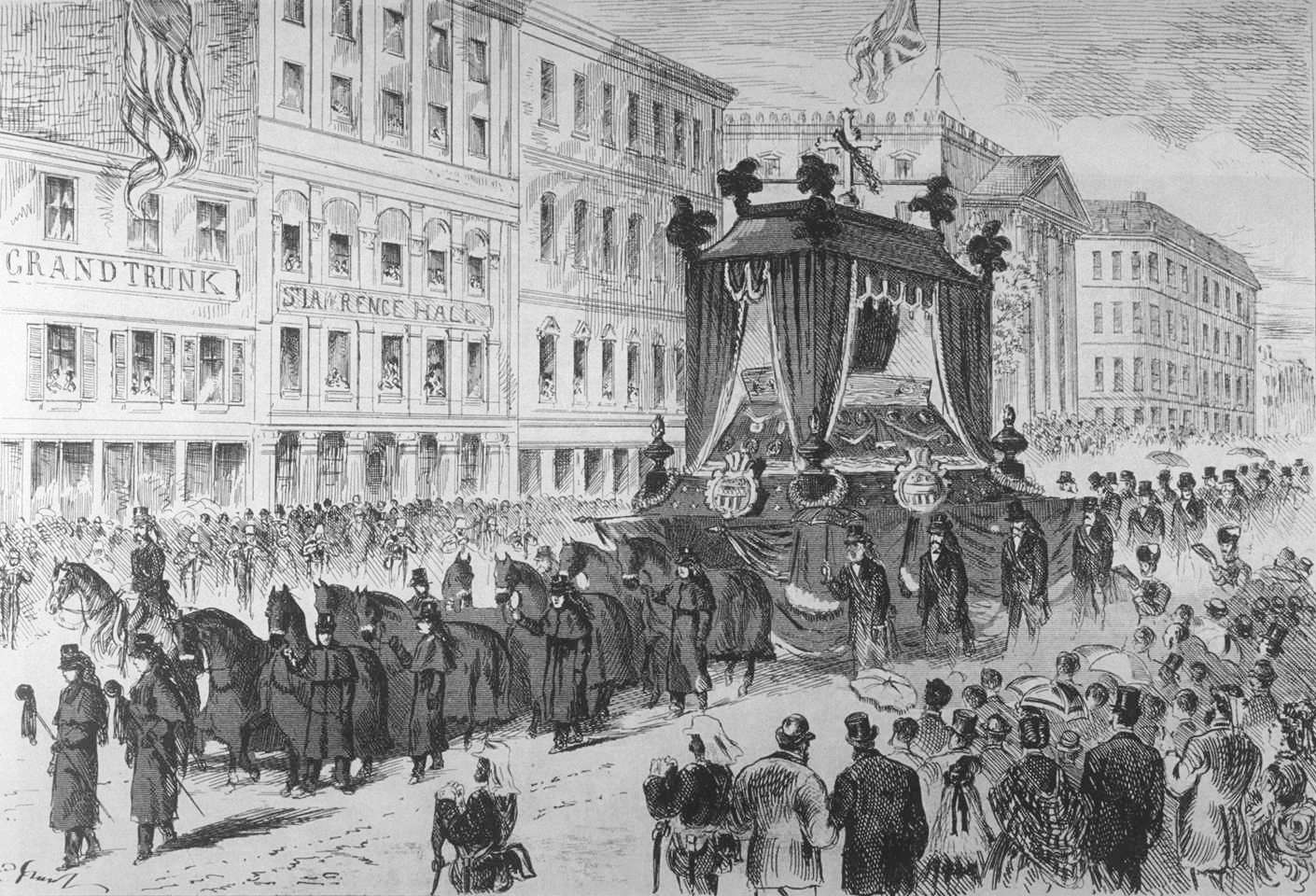
Funeral procession, Montreal

In 1871, Cartier experienced the first symptom of Bright's Disease, a kidney disease. After the 1872 election, Cartier travelled to London hoping to find a cure. His health did not improve and he died in London on May 20, 1873, at the age of 58. He was unable to pay a visit to his Manitoba riding where he was acclaimed a Member of Parliament. His body was brought back to Canada, and interred in the Cimetière Notre-Dame-des-Neiges in Montreal, following a public funeral procession.

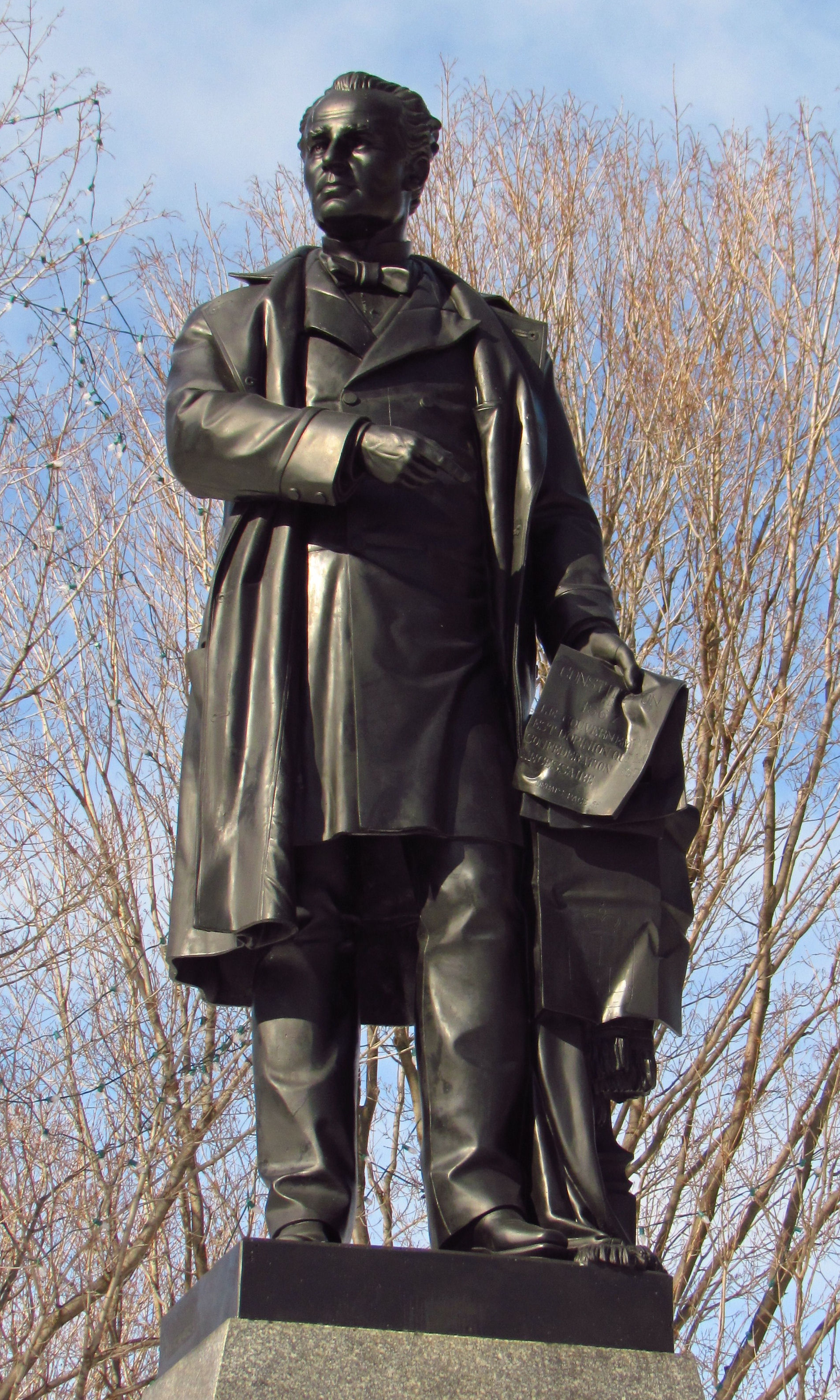
Statue of Sir George-Étienne Cartier on Parliament Hill, Ottawa

== Family ==
George-Étienne Cartier married Hortense Fabre, daughter of Édouard-Raymond Fabre, former mayor of Montreal, on June 16, 1846. The couple had three children, all girls, one of whom died in infancy, and one in 1886. After she was widowed, Lady Cartier enjoyed a pension of $1,200 in recognition of her husband's services. When Caroline, the eldest daughter, died in March 1886, at her request her remains were brought to Montreal and interred alongside those of her father. Lady Cartier and their surviving daughter Hortense lived in Cannes, France, until Lady Cartier died on February 27, 1898. She was buried in Quebec alongside her husband and daughter, in Notre Dame des Neiges Cemetery. In 1892 Lady Cartier presented a marble bust of her husband to the Legislative Assembly of Quebec.

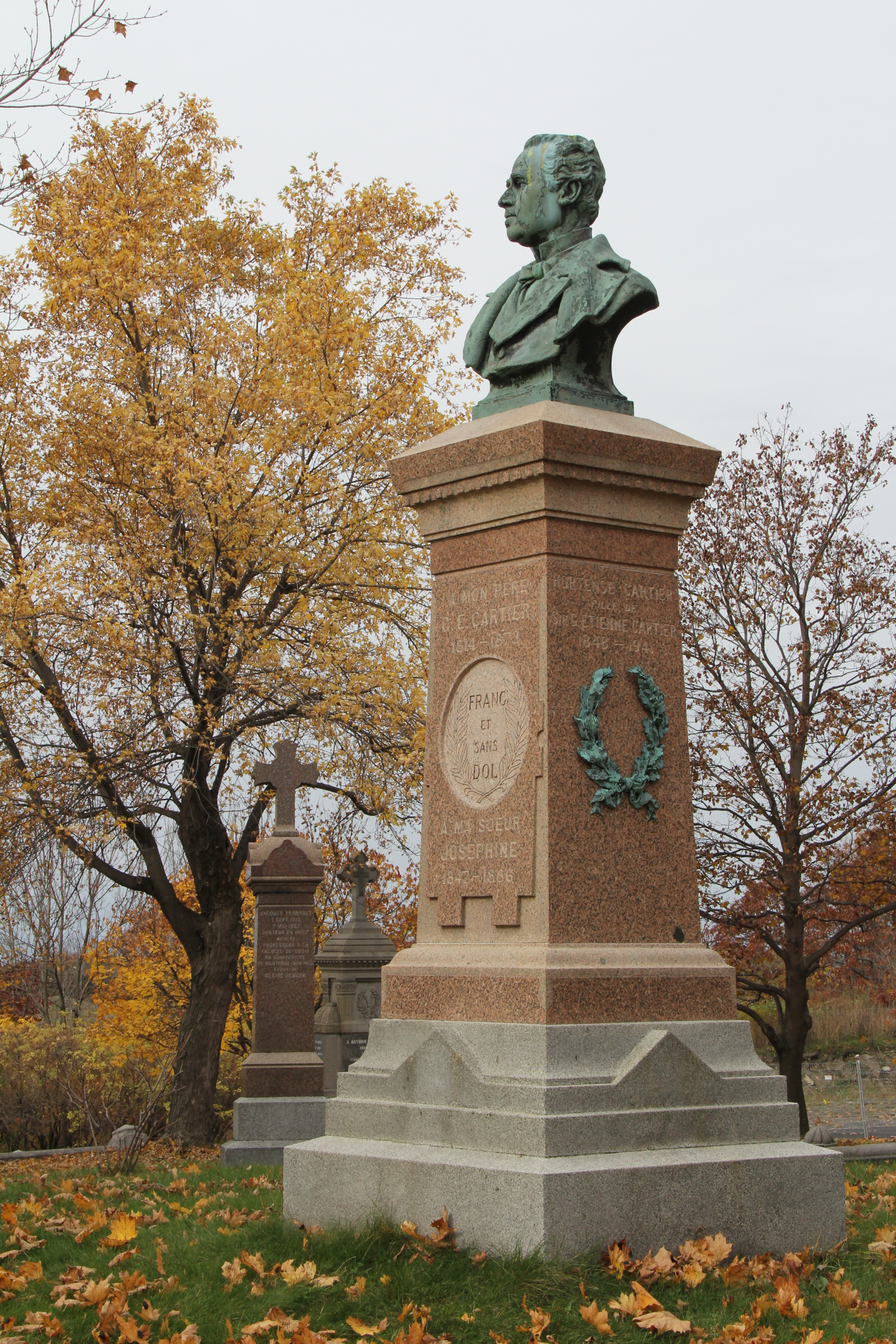
Cartier's final resting place in the Notre-Dame des Neiges Cemetery (the same cemetery where fellow Father of Confederation Thomas D'Arcy McGee is buried).

Cartier's niece Victoria Cartier was a noted Canadian music educator, organist and pianist.

== Legacy ==
The entry of Canada East (Quebec) into the Confederation is Cartier's most significant contribution to his country. Following the rebellions in 1837/1838 and the Durham Report, Upper and Lower Canada were merged into a single colony. Great Britain had begun to loosen its ties to the North American colonies. The United States was becoming more and more powerful, and represented a threat to Canada. In 1864, George Brown, leader of the Clear Grits in Canada West (Ontario), proposed an alliance with the Conservatives of Macdonald and Cartier. In 1867, following a series of discussions and conferences (at Charlottetown and Quebec), the alliance known as the Grand Coalition succeeded in forging the agreement which gave birth to Confederation. From this time onwards, the new federal government convened in Ottawa. In 1834 he contributed to founding the Société Saint-Jean-Baptiste patriotic society, where he sang his famous poem Ô Canada! mon pays, mes amours (not to be confused with the national anthem of Canada).

== Honours and memorials ==
To celebrate the part he played in the country's development, Cartier was created a baronet, of Montreal, in the Baronetage of the United Kingdom by Queen Victoria in 1868. Since he had no legal heirs, the Cartier baronetcy became extinct on his death. In addition, he had the prenominal "the Honourable" and the postnominal "PC" for life by virtue of being made a member of the Queen's Privy Council for Canada on 1 July 1867.

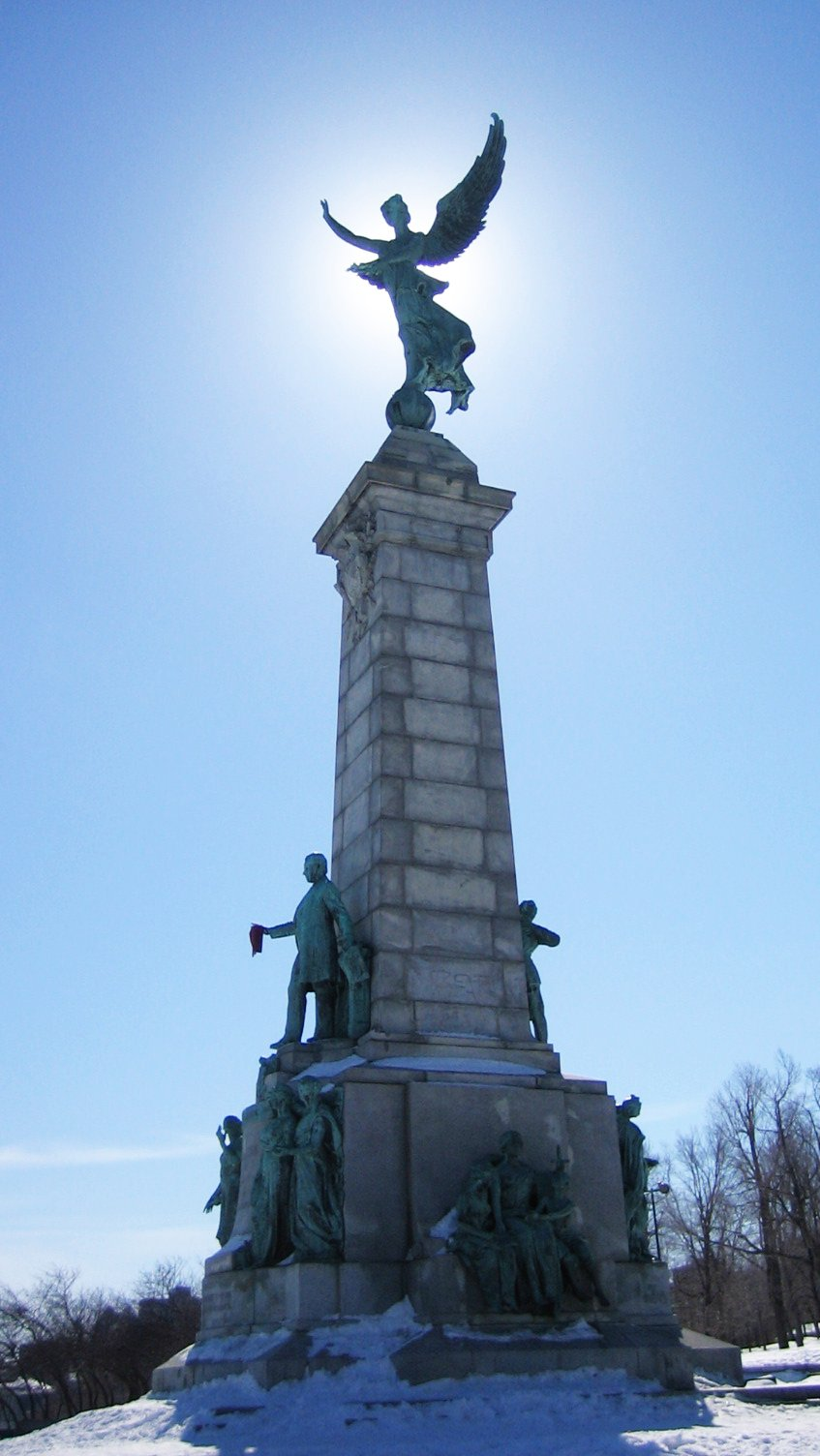
George-Étienne Cartier Monument, Mount Royal, Montreal

Ontario's Macdonald-Cartier Freeway (Highway 401) is named after Cartier and fellow Father of Confederation John A. Macdonald, as are Ottawa's Macdonald-Cartier International Airport and the Macdonald-Cartier Bridge, linking Ottawa, Ontario, with Gatineau, Quebec. The former Macdonald-Cartier High School of Saint-Hubert, Quebec, was named after John A. Macdonald and Cartier, which has merged and became Heritage Regional High School.

Cartier's residence in Montreal, at 458 Notre-Dame Street East, is now the Sir George-Étienne Cartier National Historic Site, dedicated to his life and achievements. It also serves to recall the architectural heritage and lifestyles of the upper middle class of 19th-century Montreal.

In 1931, Canada Post issued a ten-cent postage stamp with Cartier's portrait surrounded by the national symbol, the maple leaf.

Numerous streets in Quebec and elsewhere in Canada have been named for Cartier, as has the Montreal Metro's Cartier station in Laval, Quebec.

Six schools have been named in his honour:

- George-Étienne Cartier French Catholic primary school in Ottawa, Ontario.
- George-Étienne Cartier primary school in Gatineau, Québec.
- George-Étienne-Cartier French preschool in Longueuil, Quebec
- Sir George-Étienne Cartier primary school in London, Ontario.
- George-Étienne Cartier French Catholic primary school in Toronto, Ontario
- École secondaire Macdonald-Cartier high school in Sudbury, Ontario.

He was portrayed by David La Haye in the 2011 CBC Television film John A.: Birth of a Country.

In 2017, the Bank of Canada unveiled a commemorative Canadian ten-dollar note in honour of Canada 150, featuring Cartier's portrait alongside Sir John A. Macdonald, Agnes Macphail and James Gladstone.

Mount Cartier near Revelstoke, British Columbia, is named in his honour.

== Arms ==
Coat of arms of George-Étienne Cartier
| Crest An Anchor in bend-sinister Sable, Cable proper, pendent therefrom by a Gold Chain, an Escutcheon Gules, charged with a Fleur-de-lis Or. Escutcheon Per fess Gules and Or, a Fess of the last, in chief an Ermine proper, and in base five Pallets of the first. Motto FRANC ET SANS DOL (French for 'Free and without fraud') Other elements Red hand of Ulster baronet badge |

== See also ==
- List of presidents of the Saint-Jean-Baptiste Society of Montreal

== Archives ==
There is a George-Étienne Cartier fonds at Library and Archives Canada.

== Electoral history ==
1867 Canadian federal election: Montreal East
| Party | Candidate | Votes |
|---|---|---|
| Liberal–Conservative | George-Étienne Cartier | 2,431 |
| Liberal | M. Lanctot | 2,085 |
Source: Canadian Elections Database

1872 Canadian federal election: Montreal East
| Party | Candidate | Votes |
|---|---|---|
| Liberal | Louis-Amable Jetté | 3,264 |
| Liberal–Conservative | George-Étienne Cartier | 2,007 |
Source: Canadian Elections Database

1872 Canadian federal election: Provencher
| Party | Candidate | Votes |
|---|---|---|
| Liberal–Conservative | George-Étienne Cartier | acclaimed |
Source: Canadian Elections Database

== Biographies ==
- Sweeny, Alastair (1976). George-Étienne Cartier: A Biography. McClelland and Stewart. ISBN 0-7710-8363-7.
- "Biography of George-Étienne Cartier". Dictionnaire des parlementaires du Québec de 1792 à nos jours (in French). National Assembly of Quebec.
- Bonenfant, J.-C. (1972). "Cartier, Sir George-Étienne". In Hayne, David (ed.). Dictionary of Canadian Biography. Vol. X (1871–1880) (online ed.). University of Toronto Press.
- Sweeny, Alastair (August 28, 2015) [January 16, 2008]. "Sir George-Étienne Cartier". The Canadian Encyclopedia (online ed.). Historica Canada.
- Grant, William Lawson (1911). "Cartier, Sir Georges Étienne" . In Chisholm, Hugh (ed.). Encyclopædia Britannica. Vol. 5 (11th ed.). Cambridge University Press. p. 433.
- Boase, George Clement (1887). "Cartier, George Etienne" . In Stephen, Leslie (ed.). Dictionary of National Biography. Vol. 9. London: Smith, Elder & Co. pp. 219–220.

Parliament of Canada
| New district | Member of Parliament for Montreal East; 1867–1872 | Succeeded by Louis-Amable Jetté |
| Preceded by Pierre Delorme | Member of Parliament for Provencher; 1872–1873 | Succeeded by Louis Riel |
Political offices
| Preceded by Sir Étienne-Paschal Taché | Joint Premiers of the Province of Canada – Canada East; 1857–1858 | Succeeded by Antoine-Aimé Dorion |
| Preceded by Antoine-Aimé Dorion | Joint Premiers of the Province of Canada – Canada East; 1858–1862 | Succeeded by Sir Louis-Victor Sicotte |
| Preceded by Sir Dominick Daly | Provincial Secretary of the Province of Canada; 1855–1857 | Unknown |
Baronetage of the United Kingdom
| New creation | Baronet (of Montreal); 1868–1873 | Extinct |
