= Lake Saint Francis (Canada) =

- lac Saint-François
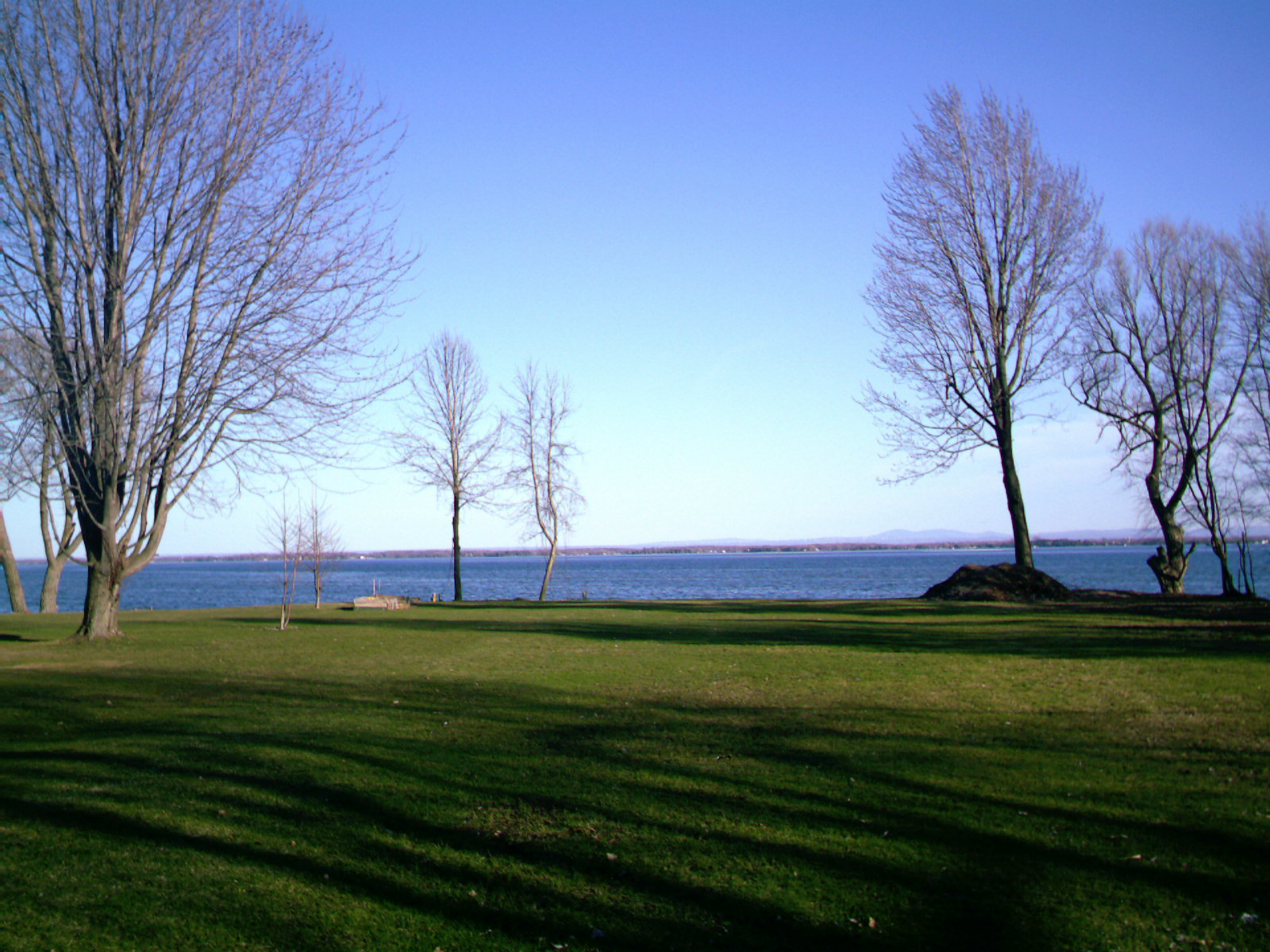
- View of Lake St. Francis from Highway 2 in South Glengarry, Ontario, near the Quebec border.

- Location within Ontario
- Location: Ontario/Quebec/New York
- Coordinates: 45°10′N 74°22′W
- Type: lake
- Primary inflows: Saint Lawrence River
- Primary outflows: Saint Lawrence River
- Basin countries: Canada, United States
- Settlements: Salaberry-de-Valleyfield

Ramsar Wetland
- Official name: Lac Saint-François
- Designated: 27 May 1987
- Reference no.: 361

Lake Saint Francis (French: lac Saint-François, pronounced [lak sɛ̃ fʁɑ̃swa]) is a lake which borders southeastern Ontario, southwestern Quebec and northern New York State. It is located on the Saint Lawrence River between Lake Ontario and Montreal, Quebec. The lake forms part of the Saint Lawrence Seaway.

The city of Salaberry-de-Valleyfield is located at the east end of the lake.

Lac Saint-François National Wildlife Area, located on the south shore of the lake, protects wetlands located on the shores of the lake. This area provides important habitat for Redhead ducks and other waterfowl. Thousands of migrating waterfowl stop over in this region. In 1987, it was recognized as a wetland of international significance under the Ramsar Convention.

The Charlottenburgh Marsh, including Cooper Marsh, is an important wetland area located on the north shore of the lake.
