= Collège de Valleyfield =

Public college in Valleyfield, Quebec

Valleyfield College
- Collège de Valleyfield
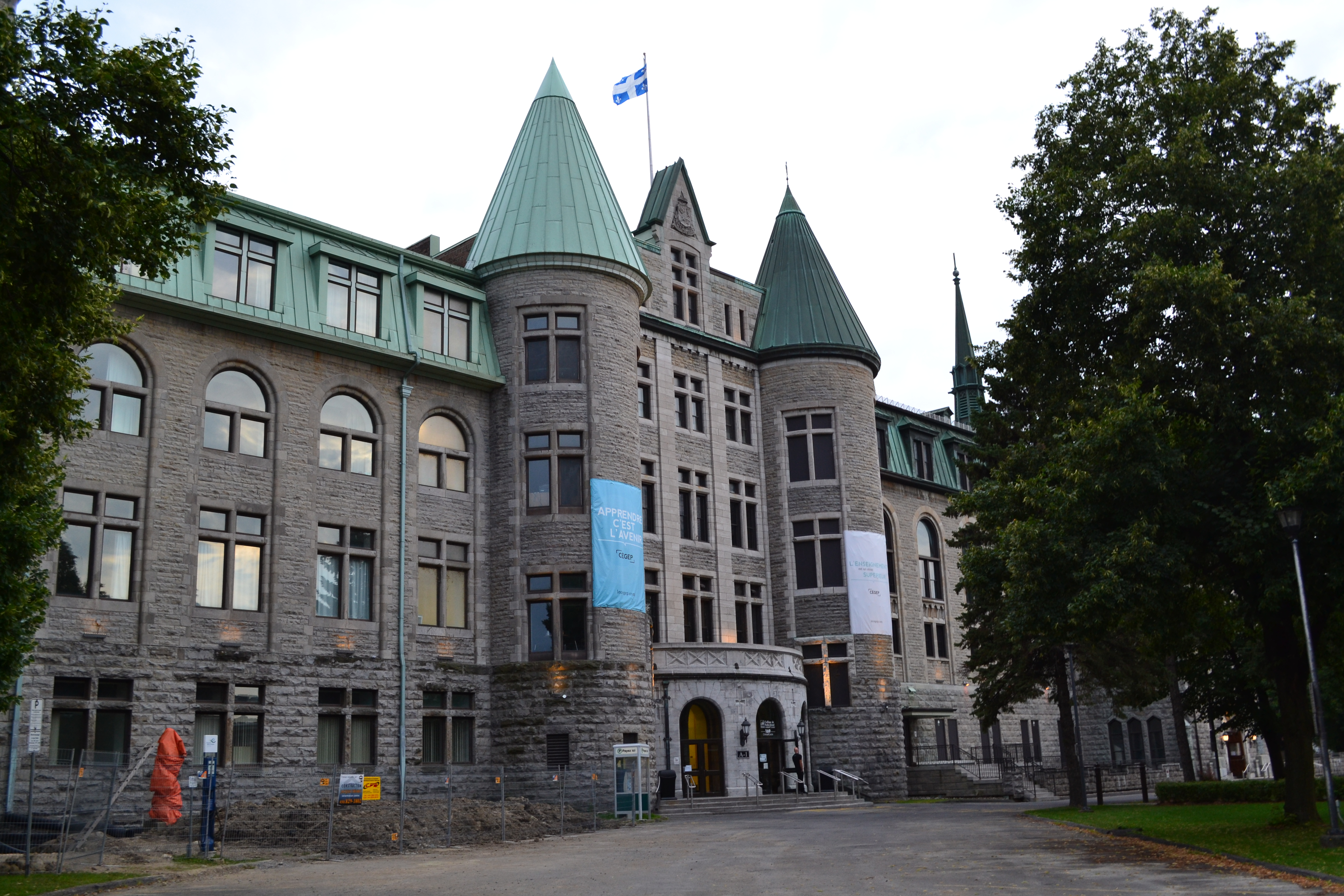
- Other name: Noir et Or
- Former name: Séminaire Saint-Thomas-d'Aquin
- Type: public CEGEP
- Established: 1967
- Director General: Suzie Grondin
- Academic staff: 200
- Administrative staff: 90
- Students: 2300
- Location: 169 Champlain Street, Salaberry-de-Valleyfield, Quebec, Canada; 45.2528°N 74.1331°W
- Campus: Suburban
- Language: French
- Colours: Black and gold
- Website: www.colval.qc.ca

Cégep de Valleyfield is a College of general and vocational education (CEGEP) in Salaberry-de-Valleyfield, Quebec, Canada. It is located at 169 Champlain Street. It was established in 1896, and became public in 1967.

== History ==
In 1892, the mayor of Salaberry-de-Valleyfield, John H. Sullivan, with the support of councillors, asked the Bishop of Valleyfield, Joseph-Médard Émard, to quickly establish a classical college.

In 1895, a building was erected to accommodate 27 students while awaiting construction on Champlain Street of the current Valleyfield College.

On September 5, 1896, Valleyfield College opened its doors.

On April 3, 1925, due to a law, Valleyfield College became the Séminaire de Valleyfield (Seminary of Valleyfield) or the "St-Thomas d'Aquin Seminary". It was renamed Valleyfield College and became public in August 1967. It is one of the twelve founding CEGEPs of the public college education system in Quebec.
