= Grande-Île, Quebec =

Grande-Île (Salaberry-de-Valleyfield)
- Former municipality
- Interactive map of Grande-Île
- Coordinates: 45°16′45″N 74°06′50″W
- Country: Canada
- Province: Quebec
- Region: Montérégie
- RCM: Beauharnois-Salaberry
- Merged +: Jan 01, 2002

Area
  - Land: 50.68 km^{2} (19.57 sq mi)
- Time zone: UTC-5 (EST)
  - Summer (DST): UTC-4 (EDT)
- Area code: 450
- Access Routes: R-132; R-201
- + Merged with Salaberry-de-Valleyfield

Grande-Île (French pronunciation: [ɡʁɑ̃d il], lit. 'Large Island') is an island in the St. Lawrence River in Quebec, Canada. The island is mostly occupied by the city Salaberry-de-Valleyfield. Part of the Hochelaga Archipelago, the island connects the Beauharnois-Salaberry and the Vaudreuil-Soulanges regions over the Saint Lawrence River via the Pont Monseigneur Langlois. Grande-Île was also the name of a municipality on the island which merged with Salaberry-de-Valleyfield on January 1, 2002.

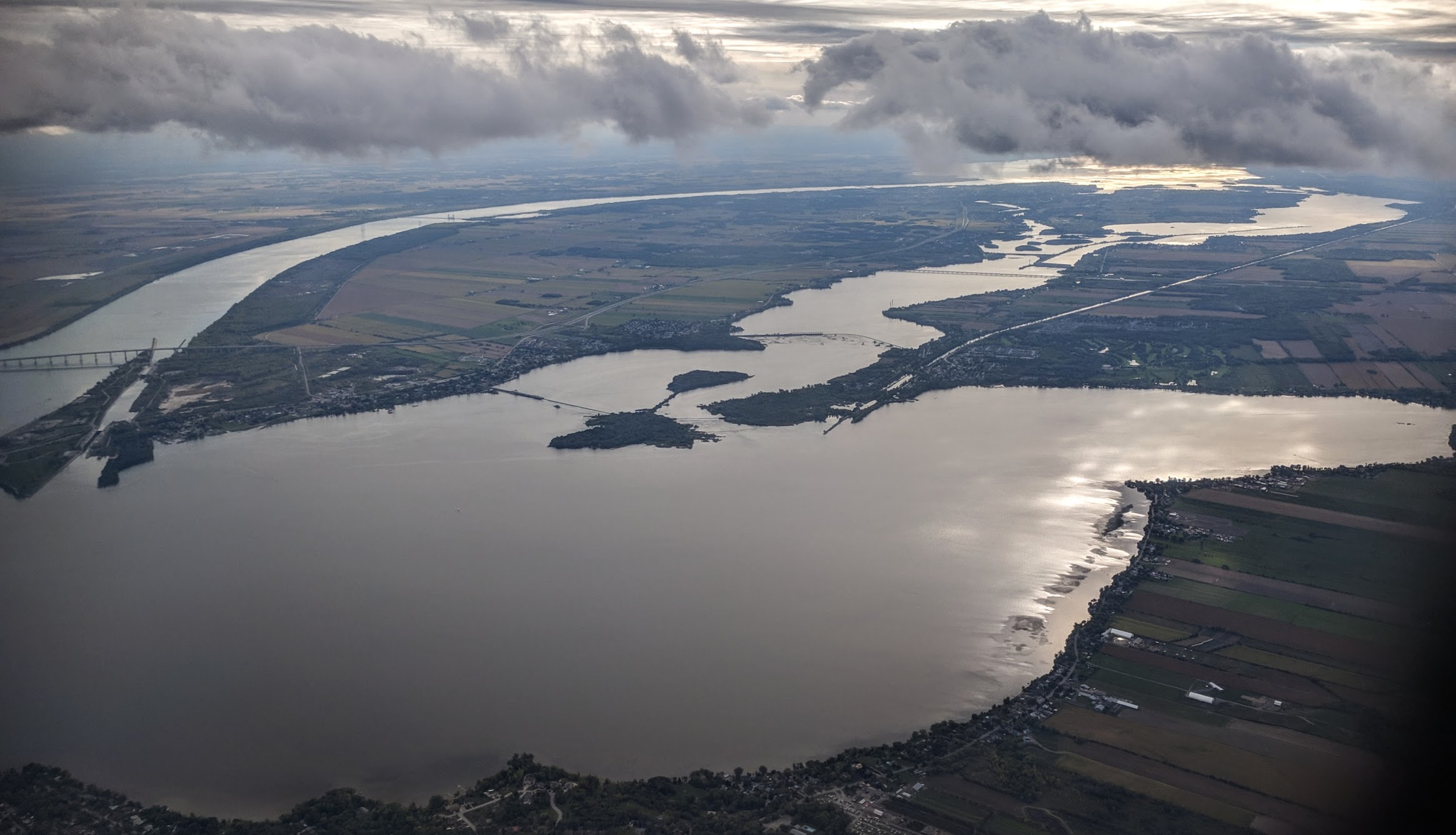
Aerial view showing (left to right) Canal de Beauharnois, Grande-Île, Saint Lawrence River, Pointe-des-Cascades, Ottawa River, Perrot Island
