= Achille Bergevin =

Canadian politician

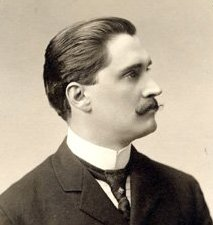

Member of the Legislative Assembly of Quebec for Beauharnois
- In office 1900–1908
- Preceded by: Arthur Plante
- Succeeded by: Arthur Plante
- In office 1919–1923
- Preceded by: Edmund Arthur Robert
- Succeeded by: Arthur Plante

Member of the Legislative Council of Quebec for Repentigny
- In office 1910–1913
- Preceded by: Horace Archambeault
- Succeeded by: Georges-Aimé Simard

Member of the Legislative Council of Quebec for De Salaberry
- In office 1913–1914
- Preceded by: Jean-Damien Rolland
- Succeeded by: Alphonse Racine

Personal details
- Born: 3 March 1870 Salaberry-de-Valleyfield, Quebec, Canada
- Died: 16 April 1933 (aged 63) Montreal, Quebec, Canada
- Party: Liberal

Achille Bergevin (3 March 1870 – 16 April 1933) was a Canadian politician in the province of Quebec.

Born in Salaberry-de-Valleyfield, Quebec, the son of Gilbert Bergevin and Marie Daoust, Bergevin was educated at the Commercial Academy of Varennes.

He was elected to the Legislative Assembly of Quebec for the electoral district of Beauharnois in the 1900 election. A Liberal, he was re-elected in 1904 and was defeated in 1908. He was appointed to the Legislative Council of Quebec for the Repentigny division in 1910. He resigned in 1913 and was re-appointed for the De Salaberry division. He resigned in 1914, after allegations were made against him by the Montreal Daily Mail. He was re-elected to the Legislative Assembly in 1919 and was defeated in 1923. He ran unsuccessfully as an independent Liberal for the House of Commons of Canada for the federal riding of Beauharnois in the 1926 election.
