= Salaberry-de-Valleyfield =

- City
- Ville de Salaberry-de-Valleyfield
- Salaberry-de-Valleyfield in 2026

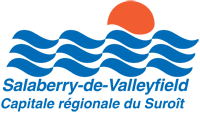
- Coat of arms Logo
- Nickname: The Venice of Quebec
- Motto: Ubi lux ibi labor
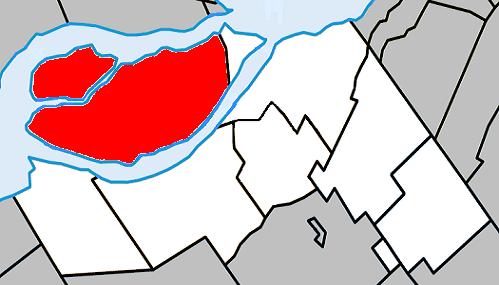
- Location within Beauharnois-Salaberry RCM

- Location in southern Quebec
- Coordinates: 45°15′N 74°08′W
- Country: Canada
- Province: Quebec
- Region: Montérégie
- RCM: Beauharnois-Salaberry
- Founded: 1874
- Constituted: April 24, 2002
- Named for: Charles-Michel d'Irumberry de Salaberry
- Boroughs: List of boroughs: Grande-Île; Nitro; Georges-Leduc; Champlain; La Baie; Robert-Cauchon; Jules-Léger; Saint-Timothée

Government
  - Type: Mayor-council government
  - Mayor: Miguel Lemieux
  - Federal riding: Beauharnois—Salaberry—Soulanges—Huntingdon
  - Prov. riding: Beauharnois

Area
  - Total: 126.99 km^{2} (49.03 sq mi)
  - Land: 108.56 km^{2} (41.92 sq mi)
  - Urban: 33.93 km^{2} (13.10 sq mi)

Population (2021)
  - Total: 42,787
  - Density: 394.1/km^{2} (1,021/sq mi)
  - Urban: 41,655
  - Urban density: 1,227.6/km^{2} (3,179/sq mi)
  - Pop 2016-2021: ▲5.0%
  - Dwellings: 20,962
- Demonym(s): Campivallensien, Campivallensienne (fr) Campivallensian (en)
- Time zone: UTC−5 (EST)
  - Summer (DST): UTC−4 (EDT)
- Postal code(s): J6S, J6T, J7X
- Area codes: 450 and 579
- Highways A-30 A-530: R-132; R-201
- Website: www.ville.valleyfield.qc.ca

Salaberry-de-Valleyfield (French pronunciation: [salabɛʁi də valefiɫd]) is a city in southwestern Quebec, Canada, in the Regional County Municipality of Beauharnois-Salaberry. The population as of 2021 was 42,410.

The historic downtown is a major touristic centre for the area.

Due to the presence of Lake St. Francis on the St. Lawrence River, St. Francis Bay in downtown, and of numerous rivers and canals all over the town, the city is nicknamed "The Venice of Quebec".

== History ==
The current city was founded in 1874, the first mayor was Moise Plante. The first settlers arrived in 1798. At that moment, the settlement was named Pointe-du-Lac (Lake Point). The colony was then renamed Saranac, then Sainte-Cécile. Salaberry-de-Valleyfield was officially named in 1874 after Colonel Charles de Salaberry who served with the British army during the War of 1812. "Valleyfield" came from the Valleyfield Mills, a paper mill south of Edinburgh in Scotland.

On August 16, 1888, an F4 tornado struck Salaberry‑de‑Valleyfield, causing extensive damage, killing around nine people and with 14 to 16 injuries.

The city is the seat of the Roman Catholic Diocese of Valleyfield, founded in 1892.

Salaberry-de-Valleyfield is also the seat of the judicial district of Beauharnois since 1901.

=== Merger ===
In 2002, the city of 26,170 amalgamated with the following communities (2001 Canada census figures):

- Saint-Timothée (8,299)
- Grande-Île (4,559)

== Geography ==
Situated on Grande-Île, an island in the Saint Lawrence River, it is bordered at its western end by Lake Saint Francis, with the Saint Lawrence to the north and the Beauharnois Canal to its south. The Port of Valleyfield is on the canal.

=== Climate ===
Salaberry-de-Valleyfield has a humid continental climate (Dfb) with warm summers and long, cold, and snowy winters.

Climate data for Salaberry-de-Valleyfield (1981–2010 normals, extremes 1952–2010)
| Month | Jan | Feb | Mar | Apr | May | Jun | Jul | Aug | Sep | Oct | Nov | Dec | Year |
|---|---|---|---|---|---|---|---|---|---|---|---|---|---|
| Record high °C (°F) | 14.0 (57.2) | 16.0 (60.8) | 23.0 (73.4) | 30.0 (86.0) | 35.0 (95.0) | 34.4 (93.9) | 35.6 (96.1) | 36.5 (97.7) | 35.0 (95.0) | 28.9 (84.0) | 22.5 (72.5) | 17.0 (62.6) | 36.5 (97.7) |
| Mean daily maximum °C (°F) | −5.4 (22.3) | −3.3 (26.1) | 2.3 (36.1) | 11.2 (52.2) | 18.7 (65.7) | 23.8 (74.8) | 26.1 (79.0) | 25.3 (77.5) | 20.6 (69.1) | 12.8 (55.0) | 5.8 (42.4) | −1.4 (29.5) | 11.4 (52.5) |
| Daily mean °C (°F) | −9.6 (14.7) | −7.8 (18.0) | −2.2 (28.0) | 6.3 (43.3) | 13.3 (55.9) | 18.7 (65.7) | 21.1 (70.0) | 20.2 (68.4) | 15.6 (60.1) | 8.6 (47.5) | 2.2 (36.0) | −5.1 (22.8) | 6.8 (44.2) |
| Mean daily minimum °C (°F) | −13.8 (7.2) | −12.3 (9.9) | −6.7 (19.9) | 1.3 (34.3) | 7.9 (46.2) | 13.5 (56.3) | 16.0 (60.8) | 15.1 (59.2) | 10.6 (51.1) | 4.3 (39.7) | −1.4 (29.5) | −8.8 (16.2) | 2.1 (35.8) |
| Record low °C (°F) | −38.3 (−36.9) | −33.5 (−28.3) | −29 (−20) | −15.6 (3.9) | −4.4 (24.1) | 2.2 (36.0) | 6.5 (43.7) | 1.7 (35.1) | −2.0 (28.4) | −8.9 (16.0) | −21.0 (−5.8) | −32.0 (−25.6) | −38.3 (−36.9) |
| Average precipitation mm (inches) | 74.8 (2.94) | 59.3 (2.33) | 61.9 (2.44) | 77.3 (3.04) | 82.9 (3.26) | 94.7 (3.73) | 97.6 (3.84) | 92.5 (3.64) | 82.6 (3.25) | 92.0 (3.62) | 85.7 (3.37) | 76.8 (3.02) | 978.0 (38.50) |
| Average rainfall mm (inches) | 24.2 (0.95) | 19.9 (0.78) | 31.9 (1.26) | 70.3 (2.77) | 82.9 (3.26) | 97.4 (3.83) | 97.6 (3.84) | 92.5 (3.64) | 82.6 (3.25) | 90.6 (3.57) | 74.4 (2.93) | 33.1 (1.30) | 794.7 (31.29) |
| Average snowfall cm (inches) | 50.6 (19.9) | 39.3 (15.5) | 30.1 (11.9) | 7.2 (2.8) | 0.0 (0.0) | 0.0 (0.0) | 0.0 (0.0) | 0.0 (0.0) | 0.0 (0.0) | 1.3 (0.5) | 11.3 (4.4) | 43.7 (17.2) | 183.5 (72.2) |
| Average precipitation days (≥ 0.2 mm) | 14.2 | 11.2 | 11.2 | 12.0 | 13.7 | 12.2 | 12.7 | 11.4 | 11.5 | 13.0 | 13.6 | 14.2 | 150.9 |
| Average rainy days (≥ 0.2 mm) | 3.7 | 3.5 | 6.4 | 11.6 | 13.7 | 12.2 | 12.7 | 11.4 | 11.5 | 13.0 | 11.8 | 6.0 | 117.3 |
| Average snowy days (≥ 0.2 cm) | 11.5 | 8.5 | 5.9 | 1.7 | 0.0 | 0.0 | 0.0 | 0.0 | 0.0 | 0.27 | 3.2 | 9.4 | 40.5 |
Source: Environment Canada

== Demographics ==
Historical census data - Salaberry-de-Valleyfield, Quebec

| Year | Pop. | ±% |
|---|---|---|
| 1881 | 3,906 | — |
| 1891 | 5,515 | +41.2% |
| 1901 | 11,055 | +100.5% |
| 1911 | 9,449 | −14.5% |
| 1921 | 9,215 | −2.5% |
| 1931 | 11,411 | +23.8% |
| 1941 | 17,052 | +49.4% |
| 1951 | 22,414 | +31.4% |

| Year | Pop. | ±% |
|---|---|---|
| 1956 | 23,584 | +5.2% |
| 1961 | 27,297 | +15.7% |
| 1966 | 29,111 | +6.6% |
| 1971 | 30,173 | +3.6% |
| 1976 | 29,716 | −1.5% |
| 1981 | 29,574 | −0.5% |
| 1986 | 27,942 | −5.5% |
| 1991 | 27,598 | −1.2% |

| Year | Pop. | ±% |
|---|---|---|
| 1996 | 26,600 | −3.6% |
| 2001 | 26,170 | −1.6% |
| 2006 | 39,672 | +51.6% |
| 2011 | 40,077 | +1.0% |
| 2016 | 40,745 | +1.7% |
| 2021 | 42,787 | +5.0% |

Amalgamated with Saint-Timothée and Grande-Île in 2002.
Source: Statistics Canada

In the 2021 Census of Population conducted by Statistics Canada, Salaberry-de-Valleyfield had a population of 42,787 living in 20,073 of its 20,962 total private dwellings, a change of 5% from its 2016 population of 40,745. With a land area of 108.56 km^{2} (41.92 sq mi), it had a population density of 394.1/km^{2} (1,020.8/sq mi) in 2021.

Canada census – Salaberry-de-Valleyfield community profile

| | 2021 | 2016 | 2011 |
| Population | 42,787 (+5.0% from 2016) | 40,745 (+1.7% from 2011) | 40,077 (+1.0% from 2006) |
| Land area | 108.56 km^{2} (41.92 sq mi) | 107.13 km^{2} (41.36 sq mi) | 107.10 km^{2} (41.35 sq mi) |
| Population density | 394.1/km^{2} (1,021/sq mi) | 380.3/km^{2} (985/sq mi) | 374.2/km^{2} (969/sq mi) |
| Median age | 47.2 (M: 45.2, F: 49.6) | 48.3 (M: 46.0, F: 50.1) | 47.1 (M: 45.1, F: 48.7) |
| Private dwellings | 20,962 (total) | 19,356 (total) | 19,050 (total) |
| Median household income | $62,000 | $50,952 | $44,510 |

Notes: Amalgamated with Saint-Timothée and Grande-Île in 2002.
References: 2021 2016 2011

Canada Census mother tongue - Salaberry-de-Valleyfield, Quebec Amalgamated with Saint-Timothée and Grande-Île in 2002.
| Census | Total | French | | | English | | | French & English | | | Other | | |
| Year | Responses | Count | Trend | Pop % | Count | Trend | Pop % | Count | Trend | Pop % | Count | Trend | Pop % |
| 2021 | 42,325 | 38,920 | ▲3.8% | 92.0% | 1,530 | ▲31.9% | 3.6% | 690 | ▲74.7% | 1.6% | 970 | ▲70.2% | 2.3% |
| 2016 | 39,670 | 37,480 | ▲0.0% | 94.5% | 1,160 | ▲5.0% | 2.9% | 395 | ▼13.2% | 1.0% | 570 | ▲46.2% | 1.4% |
| 2011 | 39,425 | 37,475 | ▲1.7% | 95.1% | 1,105 | ▲6.8% | 2.8% | 455 | ▲89.6% | 1.2% | 390 | ▼12.4% | 1.0% |
| 2006 | 38,565 | 36,845 | ▲51.9% | 95.5% | 1,035 | ▲40.8% | 2.7% | 240 | ▲20.0% | 0.6% | 445 | ▲74.5% | 1.2% |
| 2001 | 25,450 | 24,260 | ▼2.4% | 95.3% | 735 | ▲11.4% | 2.9% | 200 | ▼14.9% | 0.8% | 255 | ▲4.1% | 1.0% |
| 1996 | 25,995 | 24,855 | n/a | 95.6% | 660 | n/a | 2.5% | 235 | n/a | 0.9% | 245 | n/a | 0.9% |

== Attractions ==
The Musée de Société des Deux-Rives (MUSO), which covers the economic and cultural history of the region, is located in the city.

The city houses one of the 10 minor basilicas in Quebec. Cathedral-Basilica of Saint Cecilia, built in 1934–1935, is one of the largest churches in the country.

The city has been the site of the Valleyfield Regattas since 1938. The event takes place every year at the beginning of July over a three-day period in the heart of the city on Bay Saint-François. It is an international hydroplane competition, in which power boats achieve speeds of up to 225 km/h. Attracting over 130,000 visitors per year, it also includes other cultural activities.

The Canadian Pontifical Zouaves Memorial Statue which commemorates Canadians who served in the Papal Zouaves is located on Victoria Street and Fabrique Street.

== Government ==
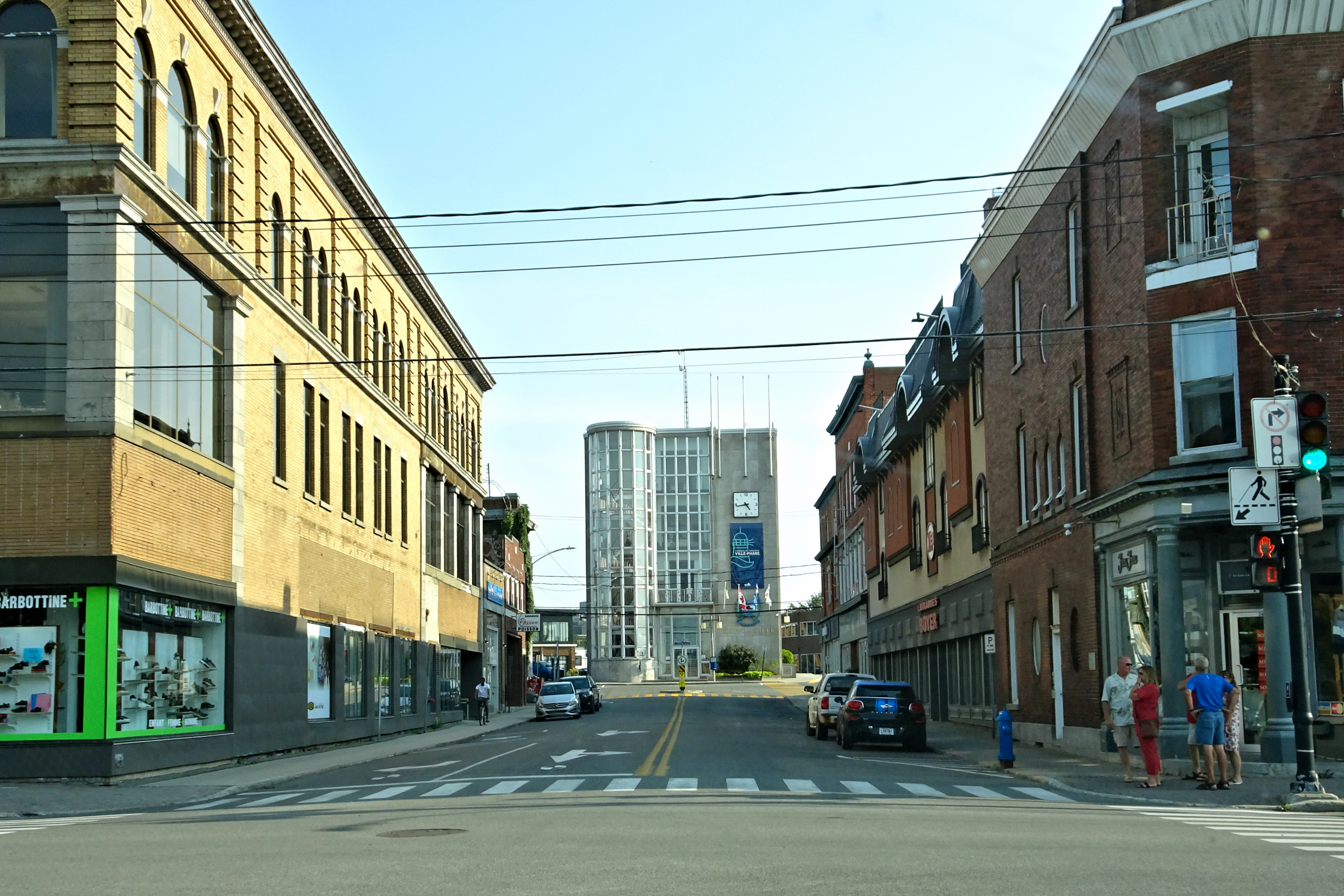
Nicholson Street with city hall in the centre

The city council is composed of the mayor and eight city councillors. The municipal elections are held every four years. Each councillor stands for his/her district.

City Council
| Function/district | 2005-2009 | 2009-2013 | 2013-2017 | 2017-2021 | 2021-2025 |
|---|---|---|---|---|---|
| Mayor | Denis Lapointe | Denis Lapointe | Denis Lapointe | Miguel Lemieux | Miguel Lemieux |
| District 1 | Denis Laître | Denis Laître | Denis Laître | Lyne Lefebvre | Lyne Lefebvre |
| District 2 | Jean-Marc Rochon | Jean-Marc Rochon | Jean-Marc Rochon | Jason Grenier | Jean-Marc Rochon |
| District 3 | Claude Reid | Louise Sauvé | Louise Sauvé | Jean-Marc Rochon | France Chenail |
| District 4 | Robert Savard | Robert Savard | Jean-Luc Pomerleau | France Chenail | Stéphane Leduc |
| District 5 | Roger Levert | Jean-Jacques Leduc | François Labossière | Guillaume Massicotte | Normand Amesse |
| District 6 | Jacques Smith | Jacques Smith | Jacques Smith | Jacques Smith | Patrick Rancourt |
| District 7 | Pierre-Paul Messier | Pierre-Paul Messier | Patrick Rancourt | Patrick Rancourt | Jean-François Giroux |
| District 8 | Normand Amesse | Normand Amesse | Normand Amesse | Normand Amesse | Sophie Sirois-Perras |

List of former mayors:

- Moïse Laplante (1875–1878, 1880–1885, 1886–1890)
- Alexander Anderson (1878–1880)
- Zéphirin Boyer (1885–1886, 1890–1892)
- John Hugh O'Sullivan (1892–1895)
- Georges Madeiros Loy (1895–1899)
- Narcisse Langevin (1899–1901)
- Onésime Longtain (1901–1903)
- Joseph Georges Henri Thibault (1903–1906)
- James Alexander Robb (1906–1910)
- Charles Ovide Ephrem Ostigui (1910–1912)
- Noel Adélard Ostilly (1912–1916)
- Stanislas Abraham Laroche (1916–1922)
- Daniel Eusèbe Dion (1922–1924)
- Joseph Donat Leboeuf (1924–1930)
- Bernard Gustave Ludger Codebecq (1930–1932)
- Olivier Philorum Billette (1932–1938)
- Joseph-Armand Landry (1938–1942)
- Louis Major (1942–1944)
- Joseph Abel Eugène Cauchon (1944–1948, 1960–1969)
- Joseph Olivier Edmond Caza (1948–1954)
- Joseph Mathias Louis Covignon (1954–1960)
- Joseph-Henri Raphaël Barrette (1969–1975)
- Marie Blanche Alberta Marcelle Besner-Trépanier (1975–1983)
- Martinus Maria Petrus Mooijekind (1983–1987)
- Joseph Eugène Gaetan Rousse (1987–1995)
- Denis Lapointe (1995–2017)
- Miguel Lemieux (2017–present)

== Education ==
- 9 daycare facilities
- 3 pre-kindergarten centres
- 12 elementary schools (some with daycare services), of which one is English-language.
- 1 high school
- 1 adult education centre
- 1 vocational training centre
- 1 CEGEP: Collège de Valleyfield
- 1 French-language university centre

=== Gault Institute ===
The Gault Institute was created by Andrew Frederick Gault. He created this school during the time that the Gault Cotton Mills were up and running. To heat the school at one time he used underground pipes connecting from the school to the Cotton Mills since at the time there was no electricity.

== Notable people ==
- Lise Bacon: Quebec politician
- Line Beauchamp: Quebec politician
- Jean-Luc Brassard: Olympic gold medalist in skiing
- Pierre Cossette: television and Broadway producer
- Mélodie Daoust: Olympics gold medalist in ice hockey
- Suzanne Fortier: principal at McGill University
- Armand Frappier: physician and microbiologist
- Karla Homolka: serial killer
- Vladimir Katriuk (1921–2015): alleged Nazi war criminal
- Dominic Larocque: para ice hockey athlete
- J. Albert Leduc: ice hockey player and businessman
- Paul-Émile Léger: cardinal of the Catholic Church
- Serge Marcil: politician and Minister of Employment in 1994
- Anne Minh-Thu Quach: MP for Beauharnois—Salaberry
- Jean Ouimet: former leader of the Green Party of Quebec

== See also ==
- Beauharnois-Salaberry Regional County Municipality
- Beauharnois Canal
- List of cities in Quebec
