= Fundica.com =

Privately held Canadian financial services corporation

Fundica
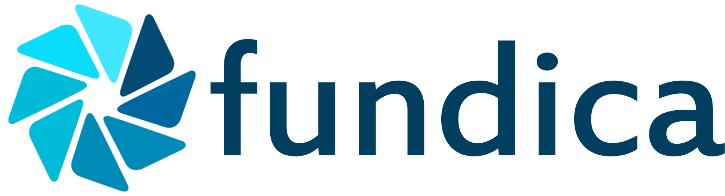
- Industry: Fintech
- Founded: 2011
- Founder: Mike Lee
- Headquarters: 1117 Saint Catherine West, Montreal, QC, Canada
- Services: Matches businesses, particularly startups and Small and medium SMEs in the technology sector, with appropriate sources of funding.
- Website: www.fundica.com

Fundica is a privately held financial services corporation based in Montreal, Quebec, that has developed an AI-powered funding search platform for banks, credit unions, business accelerators, economic development agencies and other entrepreneur-supporting organizations across North America. Businesses can access Fundica’s search technology through the website of an entrepreneur-supporting organization and use it to find relevant funding sources based on company profile and stated needs.

The Fundica platform contains information about public sector and private sector funding opportunities in Canada and the U.S., such as grants, tax credits, loans, loan guarantees, equity funding programs, and venture capital investments. The platform is maintained by internet bots, Fundica researchers, and funders themselves.

Because it seeks to play matchmaker between businesses and appropriate funders, Fundica has been dubbed "a sort of eHarmony of the funding world."

Between 2013 and 2019, Fundica organized the Fundica Roadshow, an annual event held in cities across Canada and in the US. The Fundica Roadshow was intended to better educate entrepreneurs on funding opportunities, as well as facilitate connections between funders and entrepreneurs.

== History ==
Fundica first launched its online funding search system in 2011 as a part-time community initiative to help startups and other SMEs find relevant government funding more easily. The online tool and database was at first only available to Quebec-based businesses as a freemium survey tool. Fundica then expanded its database to include funding programs from across Canada.

Also in 2011, Fundica filed Canadian and U.S. patent applications to protect its proprietary search and intelligent filtering system for funding opportunities.

In September 2012, Fundica partnered with Startup Canada to produce Startup Contest, a national pitch competition for Canadian entrepreneurs.

In 2013, Fundica organized the first Funding Roadshow, or Fundica Roadshow, an annual event held in cities across Canada and at times in the US. The Fundica Roadshow was designed to inspire, educate and fund entrepreneurs, as well as facilitate connections between funders and entrepreneurs. Over the next few years, the Fundica Roadshow went through Halifax, Montreal, Ottawa, Toronto, Mississauga, Waterloo, Prince Edward County, Winnipeg, Edmonton, Calgary, Vancouver, Victoria and San Francisco.

In each city, the event consisted of 20 closed-room pitches, a variety of workshops about funding and online resources available to help entrepreneurs grow their business, and an evening networking session. Entrepreneurs pitched to a panel of funders and mentors to receive candid feedback on their pitch and business model, discuss funding opportunities, and potentially earn a spot at the Grand Finale to compete for an investment award from the event sponsors.

To be eligible to pitch at the Fundica Roadshow, candidates were required to have a technological component to their business, be incorporated in Canada, and be in the seed or growth stage with expected revenue growth > 50%.

In May 2013, Mike Lee, Co-founder of Fundica, was identified as one of Quebec's top 25 Emerging Entrepreneurs by C2MTL and the Claudine and Stephen Bronfman Foundation. The Emerging Entrepreneurs Contest is designed to give Quebec's most promising business minds the opportunity to share their ideas and network with the many international leaders in creativity and commerce in attendance at C2MTL. Mike Lee was also recognized in 2013-14 as the Entrepreneur of the Year by CFO Canada. This prize is awarded to the entrepreneur that shows growth and creates new products that help entrepreneurs across Canada.

In 2014, Fundica was runner-up in the Entrepreneurial Effect Award from Startup Canada. This is awarded to the individual, group, community, network or organization that has developed and produced a program, tool, research project or event that has had the greatest impact in advancing entrepreneurship awards.

Fundica officially incorporated in 2017 and changed its business model to focus on licensing its funding search technology. In 2017, Fundica also reoriented the Fundica Roadshow toward larger, theatre-style events and prizes in Vancouver, Toronto and Montreal.

In 2019, Fundica held the last edition of the Roadshow. The company ended the annual event, deciding to focus exclusively on developing the software platform, data capabilities, and associated artificial intelligence for its online funding search solutions.

Fundica then licensed its technology to several government agencies, financial institutions, and business advisors. Desjardins and Montreal InVivo became visible partners.

In 2021, Fundica expanded its database to include government funding available in the U.S.

== System ==
Using a Web search algorithm executed by internet bots, Fundica locates funding opportunities online and automatically records them in the database. Funders have the ability to submit information about their own programs via the Fundica website. Fundica’s researchers also verify and update funding information manually.

On the Fundica website, businesses seeking funding build a profile based on 20 to 30 search criteria. Fundica’s proprietary search and intelligent filtering system uses this profile to generate a list of relevant funding opportunities.

== Business Model ==
Fundica licenses its online funding search platform to banks, economic development agencies, and other entrepreneur-supporting organizations using a SaaS business model. The company’s three levels of service are:

1. AdvisorPro—Allows financial advisors to search the Fundica database directly, identify appropriate funding opportunities for their clients, and share the results.
2. Automated Funding Alerts—Sends funding opportunities to each customer’s mailing list of businesses, based on their demographics.
3. Online White Label—Enables entrepreneur-supporting organizations to gain greater insight into their customers by hosting a branded instance of Fundica’s funding search platform on their website.

== Fundica Roadshow Winners ==
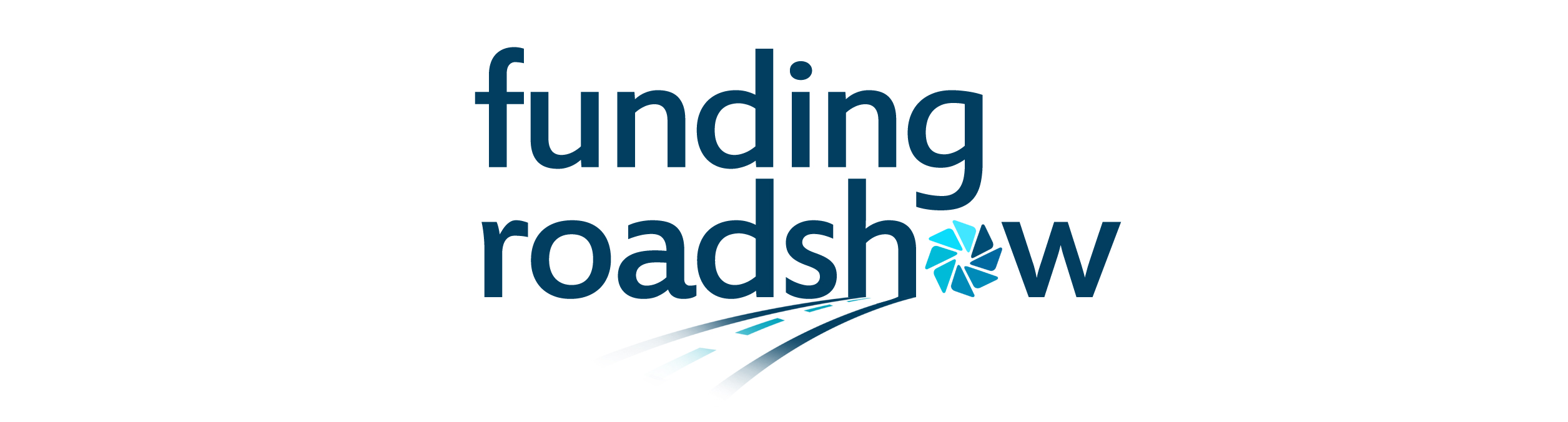
An event held in cities across Canada to educate, inspire and fund entrepreneurs.

=== 2014 ===
- Halifax: Eyeread
- Edmonton: Orpyx
- Montreal (West): Zafea-Ubios
- Victoria: Flytographer
- Winnipeg: Advolve Media
- Ottawa: SavvyDox
- Waterloo: FR8nex.com
- Calgary: Sponsor Energy Inc.
- Montreal: ReturnMe
- Vancouver: Curatio
- Toronto: OtoSim Inc.

=== 2015 ===
- Ottawa: Nuvyyo
- Toronto: Edusight
- Halifax: Vendeve
- Winnipeg: Exigence Technologies Inc.
- Vancouver: Mentio
- Victoria: KeyNexus
- Calgary: RCKTSHP
- Edmonton: EyeDentifyIt
- Toronto: eStaffMatch Inc.
- Montreal: MakerBloks
- Montreal: Hyasynth Bio

=== 2016 ===
- Ottawa: Irystec Software
- Toronto: BlancRide
- Halifax: PACTA
- Montreal: GradeSlam
- Waterloo: MobileXCo
- Vancouver: Spare Rides
- Victoria: Change Heroes Fundraising
- Calgary: KeeWave
- Toronto: Sampler Inc.
- Montreal: Phazon

=== 2017 ===
- Toronto: Flo Partners Inc.
- Montreal: reDock
- Ottawa: Uugran Drive Safe Inc.
- Waterloo: Bartesian, a cocktail-making machine
- Halifax: GreyLitMatters
- Vancouver: thisopenspace
- Victoria: Certn
- Calgary: Nobal Technologies Inc.
- Toronto: Quote Kong Inc.
- Montreal: Lexop

=== 2018 ===
- Montreal: Semeon, InVivo AI, ProcedureFlow
- Toronto: FleetOps, Pitstop Connect, GoMaterials
- Vancouver: ViewsIQ, Lumen5, Chatterhigh
- Finale (Montreal): InVivo AI, FleetOps, Lumen5
