= Hudon =

Hudon is a surname. Notable people with the surname include:

- Charles Hudon (born 1994), Canadian ice hockey player
- Isabelle Hudon (born 1967), Canadian businesswoman and diplomat
- Jean-Guy Hudon (born 1941), Canadian politician
- Jocelyn Hudon (born 1994), Canadian actress

== See also ==
- Hudson (surname)
