= Vallée-du-Haut-Saint-Laurent =

Federal electoral district in Quebec, Canada

Quebec electoral district
- Interactive map of riding boundaries from the 2025 federal election

Federal electoral district
- Legislature: House of Commons
MP
Claude DeBellefeuille
Bloc Québécois
- District created: 2013
- First contested: 2015
- Last contested: 2025
- District webpage: profile, map

Demographics
- Population (2021): 118,474
- Electors (2025): 103,422
- Area (km²): 2,271
- Pop. density (per km²): 52.2
- Census division(s): Beauharnois-Salaberry, Le Haut-Saint-Laurent, Vaudreuil-Soulanges
- Census subdivision(s): Salaberry-de-Valleyfield, Beauharnois, Saint-Zotique, Coteau-du-Lac, Les Cèdres, Les Coteaux, Ormstown, Saint-Anicet, Huntingdon, Rivière-Beaudette

Vallée-du-Haut-Saint-Laurent (formerly Beauharnois—Salaberry—Soulanges—Huntingdon and Salaberry—Suroît) is a federal electoral district in Quebec.

== Demographics ==
According to the 2021 Canadian census, 2023 representation order

Racial groups: 94.6% White, 2.0% Indigenous, 1.2% Black
Languages: 88.9% French, 10.7% English
Religions: 71.1% Christian (63.0% Catholic, 8.1% Other), 27.6% None
Median income: $40,400 (2020)
Average income: $46,640 (2020)

== History ==
Salaberry—Suroît was created by the 2012 federal electoral boundaries redistribution and was legally defined in the 2013 representation order. It came into effect upon the call of the 2015 Canadian federal election. It was created from the electoral districts of Beauharnois—Salaberry (76%) and Vaudreuil-Soulanges (24%).

Following the 2022 federal electoral boundaries redistribution, the riding was renamed Beauharnois—Salaberry—Soulanges—Huntingdon. It gained Les Cèdres and Pointe-des-Cascades from Vaudreuil—Soulanges; and lost the remainder of the Le Haut-Saint-Laurent Regional County Municipality and both the Village and Township of Hemmingford to the new riding of Châteauguay—Les Jardins-de-Napierville.

One September 16, 2026, the riding's name changed to Vallée-du-Haut-Saint-Laurent as part of Bill C-25 of the 45th Canadian Parliament.

== Profile ==
The Bloc dominates the north of the riding, in areas such as Beauharnois, Salaberry-de-Vallefield and Les Coteaux. To the south, the Liberals perform better in rural, more Anglophone communities such as Huntingdon and Ormstown. These distinctions were true even as the NDP held the riding in 2015.

== Members of Parliament ==
This riding has elected the following members of Parliament:

Parliament	Years	Member	Party
Salaberry—Suroît; Riding created from Beauharnois—Salaberry and Vaudreuil-Soulanges
42nd	2015–2019	Anne Minh-Thu Quach	New Democratic
43rd	2019–2021	Claude DeBellefeuille	Bloc Québécois
44th	2021–2025	Claude DeBellefeuille	Bloc Québécois
Beauharnois—Salaberry—Soulanges—Huntingdon
45th	2025–present	Claude DeBellefeuille	Bloc Québécois

== Election results ==
=== Beauharnois—Salaberry—Soulanges—Huntingdon ===
2025 Canadian federal election: Beauharnois—Salaberry—Soulanges—Huntingdon
Party	Candidate	Votes	%	±%	Expenditures
Bloc Québécois	Claude DeBellefeuille	30,005	43.92	-4.40	$46,525.60
Liberal	Miguel Perras	21,939	32.11	+4.81	$6,862.11
Conservative	Priska St-Pierre	13,230	19.37	+7.52	$5,240.01
New Democratic	Tyler Jones	1,663	2.43	-4.99	$2,401.54
Green	Kristian Solarik	802	1.17	+0.98	$1,075.20
People's	Martin Lévesque	675	0.99	-2.23	$0.00
Total valid votes/expense limit		68,314	98.51	+0.71	$147,957.91
Total rejected ballots		1,033	1.49	–0.71	
Turnout		69,347	67.16	+4.42	
Eligible voters (Note: Number of eligible voters does not include election day registrations.)		103,252			
Bloc Québécois notional hold		Swing		-4.61	
Source: Elections Canada

2021 federal election redistributed results
Party	Vote	%
Bloc Québécois	29,130	48.32
Liberal	16,458	27.30
Conservative	7,141	11.85
New Democratic	4,474	7.42
People's	1,994	3.31
Free	625	1.04
Indépendance du Québec	344	0.57
Green	117	0.19
Total valid votes	60,283	97.80
Rejected ballots	1,354	2.20
Registered voters/ estimated turnout	98,234	62.75

=== Salaberry—Suroît ===
2021 Canadian federal election: Salaberry—Suroît
Party	Candidate	Votes	%	±%	Expenditures
Bloc Québécois	Claude DeBellefeuille	29,093	47.8	+0.1	$30,713.12
Liberal	Linda Gallant	16,550	27.2	-2.5	$111,539.16
Conservative	Jean Collette	7,476	12.3	+2.6	$5,965.78
New Democratic	Joan Gottman	4,529	7.4	-0.6	$959.67
People's	Nicolas Thivierge	2,207	3.6	+2.4	$1,708.37
Free	Marcel Goyette	561	0.9	N/A	$633.40
Indépendance du Québec	Luc Bertrand	449	0.7	+0.2	$0.00
Total valid votes/expense limit		60,865	97.8	–	$126,226.54
Total rejected ballots		1,355	2.2		
Turnout		62,220	62.7		
Eligible voters		99,287			
Bloc Québécois hold		Swing		+1.3	
Source: Elections Canada

2019 Canadian federal election: Salaberry—Suroît
Party	Candidate	Votes	%	±%	Expenditures
Bloc Québécois	Claude DeBellefeuille	29,975	47.7	+19.34	$22,969.94
Liberal	Marc Faubert	18,682	29.7	+0.52	$65,428.26
Conservative	Cynthia Larivière	6,116	9.7	-0.27	$8,759.40
New Democratic	Joan Gottman	5,024	8.0	-22.43	none listed
Green	Nahed AlShawa	1,997	3.2	+1.79	none listed
People's	Alain Savard	767	1.2		$3,205.00
Indépendance du Québec	Luc Bertrand	342	0.5		none listed
Total valid votes/expense limit		62,903	100.0		
Total rejected ballots		1,285			
Turnout		64,188	67.0		
Eligible voters		95,776			
Bloc Québécois gain from New Democratic		Swing		+9.41	
Source: Elections Canada

2015 Canadian federal election
Party	Candidate	Votes	%	±%	Expenditures
New Democratic	Anne Minh-Thu Quach	18,726	30.43	-13.17	–
Liberal	Robert Sauvé	17,955	29.18	+21.04	–
Bloc Québécois	Claude DeBellefeuille	17,452	28.36	-5.39	$58,867.11
Conservative	Albert De Martin	6,132	9.97	-2.72	–
Green	Nicola-Silverado Socrates	867	1.41	-0.43	–
Independent	Sylvain Larocque	219	0.36	n/a	–
Strength in Democracy	Patricia Domingos	184	0.30	n/a	–
Total valid votes/Expense limit		61,535	100.00		$233,770.86
Total rejected ballots		998	1.60	–	
Turnout		92,280	67.76	–	
Eligible voters		92,280			
New Democratic hold		Swing		-17.11	
Source: Elections Canada

2011 federal election redistributed results
Party	Vote	%
New Democratic	23,547	43.6
Bloc Québécois	18,227	33.7
Conservative	6,849	12.7
Liberal	4,394	8.1
Green	991	1.8

== See also ==
- List of Canadian electoral districts
- Historical federal electoral districts of Canada
