= Nuu-chah-nulth Economic Development Corporation =

Non-profit organization

- Abbreviation: NEDC
- Type: not for profit
- Region served: Canada
- Members: 14 member Tribes
- Website: https://www.nedc.info/

The Nuu-chah-nulth Economic Development Corporation (NEDC) was incorporated in 1984 under the Canada Corporations Act as a not-for-profit organization. Although it is not tied directly to the Nuu-chah-nulth Tribal Council (NTC), the NEDC was formed to help the Nuu-chah-nulth people achieve economic and social independence by providing financial assistance and advisory services. NEDC manages a number of funding programs aimed at enhancing economic development in the region.

== Roles and Responsibilities ==
The NEDC is an aboriginal corporation dealing with financial and business development services. It plays a major role in helping Nuu-chah-nulth communities by exploring all existing and emerging opportunities and building on the new economy. The NEDC encourages rural economic development and entrepreneurship through services available to all Aboriginal people living and operating in the Nuu-chah-nulth Territory.

NEDC is owned by the Nuu-chah-nulth First Nations who provide the direction and sets priorities for the NEDC. Within Nuu-chah-nulth territories services are offered more broadly to all Nuu-chah-nulth, Aboriginal and Métis peoples — free of charge. Some programs are offered throughout Vancouver Island and also on the Canadian mainland. If a Nuu-chah-nulth person needs services outside of the province, NEDC will put that person into contact with the organization that provides similar services in that locality.

Federal and provincial economic development programs are provided through this corporation. Contribution programs include:

- Commercial financing

- Business support (e.g., business planning)

- One-on-one business counselling

- Business workshops and conferences

NEDC partners with several organizations to deliver the best funding package to their clients. Other noted partnerships include Western Economic Diversification, the Nuu-chah-nulth Tribal Council (NTC), Business Development Bank of Canada, and the New Relationship Trust.

== Administration ==
The Board of Directors for NEDC represents the 14 member Tribes of the Nuu-chah-nulth Tribal Council (NTC), 5 members-at-large and an appointee from the NTC.
