= Bruchési =

Bruchési is a surname. Notable people with the surname include:

- Gérard Bruchési (born 1931), Canadian politician and insurance broker
- Jean Bruchési (1901–1979), Canadian writer, historian, public servant, and diplomat
- Paul Bruchési (1855–1939), Canadian prelate, Archbishop of Montreal
