= Serge Marcil =

Canadian politician

The Hon. Serge Marcil

Member of the Canadian Parliament for Beauharnois—Salaberry
- In office 2000–2004
- Preceded by: Daniel Turp
- Succeeded by: Alain Boire

MNA for Salaberry-Soulanges
- In office 1989–1994
- Succeeded by: Serge Deslières

MNA for Beauharnois
- In office 1985–1989
- Preceded by: Laurent Lavigne
- Succeeded by: Serge Deslières

Personal details
- Born: January 20, 1944 Valleyfield, Quebec
- Died: January 12, 2010 (aged 65) Port-au-Prince, Haiti
- Party: Liberal
- Other political affiliations: Quebec Liberal Party
- Cabinet: Provincial: Minister of Employment (1994)
- Portfolio: Federal: Parliamentary Secretary to the Minister of the Environment with special emphasis on Parks (2003–2004); Parliamentary Secretary to the Minister of Industry (2002–2003)

Serge Marcil PC (January 20, 1944 – January 12, 2010) was an educator, administrator and politician in Quebec, Canada.

After studying to be a teacher in Montreal, Marcil obtained work at various secondary schools as an administrator. He also served on his local city council in the early 1980s before entering the Quebec National Assembly as a Liberal Member of the National Assembly (MNA) in the 1985 Quebec provincial election in the riding of Beauharnois. He was re-elected in 1989, and became parliamentary assistant to the Minister of Labour in the Bourassa government. In 1994, he joined the provincial cabinet of Daniel Johnson as Minister of Employment, but both he and the Liberal government were defeated in the 1994 provincial election.

Marcil entered federal politics by defeating Bloc Québécois (BQ) Member of Parliament (MP) Daniel Turp in the riding of Beauharnois—Salaberry in the 2000 federal election. The Liberal MP became parliamentary secretary to the Minister of Industry in 2002. When Paul Martin succeeded Jean Chrétien as Prime Minister of Canada in 2003, he appointed Marcil to the position of parliamentary secretary to the Minister of the Environment with special emphasis on parks. He was also appointed to the Queen's Privy Council for Canada when Martin decided that parliamentary secretaries should be members of that body.

Marcil ran for re-election in the 2004 general election but was defeated by Alain Boire of the BQ.

Marcil was killed in the earthquake in Haiti on January 12, 2010 (8 days shy of his 66th birthday). He had just arrived in Port-au-Prince on a business trip for his current employer, the Montreal engineering firm Groupe SM International. On January 23, his wife confirmed that Marcil's body had been found in the rubble of the Hôtel Montana. He had died instantly, on the fifth floor of the hotel.

Marcil's funeral was held on January 29 at Salaberry-de-Valleyfield, Quebec.

== Electoral record (partial) ==
2004 Canadian federal election
Party	Candidate	Votes	%	±%	Expenditures
Bloc Québécois	Alain Boire	26,775	50.7	+8.3	$40,737
Liberal	Serge Marcil	18,293	34.6	-13.6	$66,136
Conservative	Dominique Bellemare	4,864	9.2	+1.3	$56,391
Green	Rémi Pelletier	1,415	2.7	–	$30
New Democratic	Ligy Alakkattussery	1,018	1.9	+0.5	$252
Marijuana	Félix Malboeuf	480	0.9	–	
Total valid votes/Expense limit		52,845	100.0	$81,152	

2000 Canadian federal election: Beauharnois—Salaberry
Party	Candidate	Votes	%	±%	Expenditures
Liberal	Serge Marcil	23,834	48.26	–	$61,548
Bloc Québécois	Daniel Turp	20,938	42.39		$63,832
Progressive Conservative	Roma Myre	2,133	4.32		$3,768
Alliance	Stephane Renaud	1,782	3.61		$538
New Democratic	Elizabeth Clark	703	1.42		none listed
Total valid votes		49,390	100.00		
Total rejected ballots		1,390			
Turnout		50,780	70.44		
Electors on the lists		72,089			
Sources: Official Results, Elections Canada and Financial Returns, Elections Canada.
