= Gérald Laniel =

Canadian politician (1924–2016)

- Official 1980 portrait

Member of Parliament for Beauharnois—Salaberry
- In office 1962–1984
- Preceded by: Gérard Bruchési
- Succeeded by: Jean-Guy Hudon

Personal details
- Born: 8 August 1924 Salaberry-de-Valleyfield, Quebec
- Died: 2 February 2016 (aged 91)
- Party: Liberal
- Spouse: Janine Sauvé (m. 13 October 1947)
- Profession: Insurance broker, military reservist

Gérald Laniel (8 August 1924 – 2 February 2016) was a Liberal party member of the House of Commons of Canada. His career included work as an insurance broker and in the military, including service as a Royal Canadian Air Force flying officer during World War II and as a reservist from 1949 to 1958.

He represented the Quebec electoral district of Beauharnois—Salaberry since his election there in the 1962 federal election. He was re-elected in 1963, 1965, 1968, 1972, 1974, 1979 and 1980, serving eight consecutive terms in the 25th to 32nd Canadian Parliaments.

Laniel served first as Deputy Chair of Committees of the Whole from 10 October 1970 to 9 May 1974 and then as Deputy Speaker of the House of Commons from 30 September 1974 to 14 December 1979. He later served as Parliamentary Secretary to the Minister of Industry, Trade and Commerce.

Laniel left federal politics in 1984 to join the Saint Lawrence Seaway Commission.
