= BDC Young Entrepreneur Award =

The BDC Young Entrepreneur Award (YEA; French Prix jeune entrepreneur BDC) is a contest organized by the Business Development Bank of Canada (BDC) to promote youth entrepreneurship across Canada and encourage public support for it. BDC has organized the contest for business owners aged 18 to 35 since 1988 (38 years ago).

The format of the contest changed in 2012, when for the first time finalists competed online for a $100,000 grand prize and a second prize of $25,000 in consulting services.

To enter the YEA competition, applicants have to fill out an online form and submit a short video (1 to 2 minutes) in which they explain a turning point their business is facing and the solution that will take their company to the next level.

Up to 11 finalists are selected by regional selection committees across Canada. The winner and the runner-up are then determined by a public vote combined with a score attributed to each finalist by a national committee. The grand prize is to be used by the winning entrepreneur to implement his or her project.

Applicants must be Canadian citizens or permanent residents and operate a Canadian business. The application period, finalist selection and voting take place from mid-winter through mid-summer.

== Winners of the BDC Young Entrepreneur Award ==
2015

100,000 BDC Grand Prize

- Chris Cowper-Smith and Bob Garrish - Spring Loaded Technology (Nova Scotia)

Second prize ($25,000 in consulting services)

- Melissa Butler - Real Food Market (Newfoundland and Labrador)

2014

100,000 BDC Grand Prize

- Shep Ysselstein - Gunn's Hill Artisan Cheese (Woodstock, Ontario)

Second prize ($25,000 in consulting services)

- Toni Desrosiers - Abeego Design (Victoria, B.C.)

2013

100,000 BDC Grand Prize

- Joel Pinel - WOW Factor Media (Moose Jaw, Saskatchewan)

Second prize ($25,000 in consulting services)

- Max Jenke - Endeavor Design (Vancouver, B.C.)

2012

$100,000 BDC Grand Prize

- Zane Kelsall - Two if By Sea Café (Halifax, Nova Scotia)

Second prize ($25,000 in consulting services)

- Mike Miltimore – Lee's Music (Kamloops, B.C.)
