= Claude DeBellefeuille =

Canadian politician (born 1963)

Claude DeBellefeuille MP

Member of Parliament for Beauharnois—Salaberry—Soulanges—Huntingdon Salaberry—Suroît (2019–2025)
- Incumbent
- Assumed office October 21, 2019
- Preceded by: Anne Minh-Thu Quach

Member of Parliament for Beauharnois—Salaberry
- In office January 23, 2006 – May 2, 2011
- Preceded by: Alain Boire
- Succeeded by: Anne Minh-Thu Quach

Personal details
- Born: December 13, 1963 (age 62) Salaberry-de-Valleyfield, Quebec, Canada
- Party: Bloc Québécois
- Profession: Social worker

Claude DeBellefeuille MP (born December 13, 1963) is a Canadian politician serving as the member of Parliament (MP) for the riding of Salaberry—Suroît in Quebec since the 2019 federal election. A member of the Bloc Québécois (BQ), she previously served as the MP for Beauharnois—Salaberry from 2006 to 2011.

== Background ==
Born in Salaberry-de-Valleyfield, Quebec, DeBellefeuille was a social worker before becoming a politician. She was first elected in the 2006 federal election in the riding of Beauharnois—Salaberry. She defeated Alain Boire in the nomination race in the riding and went on to win the general election. DeBellefeuille was reelected in 2008 with a slightly higher margin than the previous election. Between June 2010 and May 2011, she replaced Michel Guimond as the chief Bloc Québécois Whip, previously serving as Deputy Whip. In the 2011 federal election, DeBellefeuille was a casualty of the Orange Wave, losing her seat to Anne Minh-Thu Quach of the New Democratic Party (NDP). In 2015, she ran in Salaberry—Suroît and again lost to Quach. After Quach did not run in the 2019 federal election, DeBellefeuille succeeded her.

On June 17, 2020 DeBellefeuille spoke as party whip following New Democratic Party leader Jagmeet Singh calling fellow Bloc Québécois MP Alain Therrien a ‘racist’ after he (Therrien) voted against a motion to address systemic racism and discrimination in the RCMP. On June 18, 2020 DeBellefeuille called for Singh to be blocked from speaking in Parliament due to the previous day’s ‘outburst’ but was unsuccessful.

Since 2021 she has served as the Chief Whip in the Bloc Québécois Shadow Cabinet.

She was elected vice chair of the Canadian House of Commons Standing Committee on Public Safety and National Security in the 45th Canadian Parliament in 2025.

At the time of the 2025 Canadian federal election, she lived in Ormstown, Quebec.

== Electoral record ==
2025 Canadian federal election: Beauharnois—Salaberry—Soulanges—Huntingdon
Party	Candidate	Votes	%	±%	Expenditures
Bloc Québécois	Claude DeBellefeuille	30,005	43.92	-4.40	$46,525.60
Liberal	Miguel Perras	21,939	32.11	+4.81	$6,862.11
Conservative	Priska St-Pierre	13,230	19.37	+7.52	$5,240.01
New Democratic	Tyler Jones	1,663	2.43	-4.99	$2,401.54
Green	Kristian Solarik	802	1.17	+0.98	$1,075.20
People's	Martin Lévesque	675	0.99	-2.23	$0.00
Total valid votes/expense limit		68,314	98.51	+0.71	$147,957.91
Total rejected ballots		1,033	1.49	–0.71	
Turnout		69,347	67.16	+4.42	
Eligible voters (Note: Number of eligible voters does not include election day registrations.)		103,252			
Bloc Québécois notional hold		Swing		-4.61	
Source: Elections Canada

2021 Canadian federal election: Salaberry—Suroît
Party	Candidate	Votes	%	±%	Expenditures
Bloc Québécois	Claude DeBellefeuille	29,093	47.8	+0.1	$30,713.12
Liberal	Linda Gallant	16,550	27.2	-2.5	$111,539.16
Conservative	Jean Collette	7,476	12.3	+2.6	$5,965.78
New Democratic	Joan Gottman	4,529	7.4	-0.6	$959.67
People's	Nicolas Thivierge	2,207	3.6	+2.4	$1,708.37
Free	Marcel Goyette	561	0.9	N/A	$633.40
Indépendance du Québec	Luc Bertrand	449	0.7	+0.2	$0.00
Total valid votes/expense limit		60,865	97.8	–	$126,226.54
Total rejected ballots		1,355	2.2		
Turnout		62,220	62.7		
Eligible voters		99,287			
Bloc Québécois hold		Swing		+1.3	
Source: Elections Canada

2019 Canadian federal election: Salaberry—Suroît
Party	Candidate	Votes	%	±%	Expenditures
Bloc Québécois	Claude DeBellefeuille	29,975	47.7	+19.34	$22,969.94
Liberal	Marc Faubert	18,682	29.7	+0.52	$65,428.26
Conservative	Cynthia Larivière	6,116	9.7	-0.27	$8,759.40
New Democratic	Joan Gottman	5,024	8.0	-22.43	none listed
Green	Nahed AlShawa	1,997	3.2	+1.79	none listed
People's	Alain Savard	767	1.2		$3,205.00
Indépendance du Québec	Luc Bertrand	342	0.5		none listed
Total valid votes/expense limit		62,903	100.0		
Total rejected ballots		1,285			
Turnout		64,188	67.0		
Eligible voters		95,776			
Bloc Québécois gain from New Democratic		Swing		+9.41	
Source: Elections Canada

2015 Canadian federal election
Party	Candidate	Votes	%	±%	Expenditures
New Democratic	Anne Minh-Thu Quach	18,726	30.43	-13.17	–
Liberal	Robert Sauvé	17,955	29.18	+21.04	–
Bloc Québécois	Claude DeBellefeuille	17,452	28.36	-5.39	$58,867.11
Conservative	Albert De Martin	6,132	9.97	-2.72	–
Green	Nicola-Silverado Socrates	867	1.41	-0.43	–
Independent	Sylvain Larocque	219	0.36	n/a	–
Strength in Democracy	Patricia Domingos	184	0.30	n/a	–
Total valid votes/Expense limit		61,535	100.00		$233,770.86
Total rejected ballots		998	1.60	–	
Turnout		92,280	67.76	–	
Eligible voters		92,280			
New Democratic hold		Swing		-17.11	
Source: Elections Canada

2011 Canadian federal election
Party	Candidate	Votes	%	±%	Expenditures
New Democratic	Anne Minh-Thu Quach	23,978	43.78	+32.22	–
Bloc Québécois	Claude DeBellefeuille	18,182	33.20	-16.86	–
Conservative	David Couturier	7,049	12.87	-7.37	–
Liberal	François Deslandres	4,559	8.32	-6.55	–
Green	Rémi Pelletier	1,003	1.83	-1.45	–
Total valid votes/Expense limit		54,771	100.00	–	
Total rejected ballots		778	1.40	–	
Turnout		55,569	62.34	–	
Eligible voters		89,141	–	–	
New Democratic gain from Bloc Québécois		Swing		+24.54	

2008 Canadian federal election
Party	Candidate	Votes	%	±%	Expenditures
Bloc Québécois	Claude DeBellefeuille	26,904	50.06	+2.53	$57,397
Conservative	Dominique Bellemare	10,858	20.20	-6.31	$85,410
Liberal	Maria Lopez	7,995	14.87	-0.14	$6,993
New Democratic	Anne Minh-Thu Quach	6,214	11.56	+4.01	$2,272
Green	David Smith	1,764	3.28	-0.10	$5,184
Total valid votes/Expense limit		53,735	100.00	$89,601	
Bloc Québécois hold		Swing		-4.52	

2006 Canadian federal election
Party	Candidate	Votes	%	±%	Expenditures
Bloc Québécois	Claude DeBellefeuille	26,190	47.53	-3.1	$51,521
Conservative	David Couturier	14,609	26.51	+17.3	$7,923
Liberal	John Khawand	8,272	15.01	-19.6	$80,914
New Democratic	Cynthia Roy	4,163	7.55	+5.6	$6,039
Green	David Smith	1,864	3.38	+0.7	
Total valid votes/Expense limit		55,098	100.00	$82,960	
