= Small Business Week =

Canadian event

BDC Small Business Week is a national celebration of Canadian entrepreneurs and their contribution to Canada’s economy. The Business Development Bank of Canada (BDC) has been organizing Small Business Week since 1979. It takes place every year during the third full week of October. Events held during the week bring together entrepreneurs—and prospective entrepreneurs—at conferences, workshops, luncheons and trade fairs across Canada. The goal is to provide them with opportunities to learn, network, share ideas and socialize with their peers.

== History ==
Small Business Week began in 1979 when the branches of the Federal Business Development Bank (as BDC was then known) in British Columbia’s Lower Fraser Valley organized a week of small business management training sessions for entrepreneurs. They called the initiative Small Business Week. Employees in British Columbia repeated the experiment the following year and, in 1981, Small Business Week was officially launched nationwide.

== Impact ==
The Canadian Chamber of Commerce and local chambers and boards of trade across Canada collaborate with BDC on organizing Small Business Week events. Over the years, other Crown corporations and large companies have also participated as sponsors. Each year, hundreds of activities across Canada attract thousands of business people to Small Business Week. Small Business Week has been a registered trademark of the Business Development Bank of Canada since 1986. In celebration of small business week the Registered Professional Accountants (RPA) hold the annual small business week 'Woman Entrepreneur Awards' wherein a member of the business community is honoured with an award for excellence in business for starting and successfully operating an outstanding small business in their community.

== Theme ==
Each year Small Business Week has a theme reflecting the challenges entrepreneurs face at the time. Here is a list of themes over the past few years:

- 2021→ Seizing the opportunity to build the way forward
- 2017→ Future-proof your business: Adapting to technology and demographic trends
- 2016→ Measure up! Shape your future.
- 2015→ Knock down the barriers. Dare to grow.
- 2014→ Back to Basics. Reenergize Your Business

BDC maintains a national events calendar to publicize local events and inform entrepreneurs about what's happening in their area.
