= Robert Cauchon =

Canadian politician

Mayor of Valleyfield, Quebec
- In office 1944–1947
- Preceded by: Louis VI Major
- Succeeded by: O.E. Caza

Member of Parliament for Beauharnois
- In office June 1949 – August 1953
- Preceded by: Maxime Raymond
- Succeeded by: riding became Beauharnois—Salaberry

Member of Parliament for Beauharnois—Salaberry
- In office August 1953 – March 1958
- Preceded by: riding formed from Beauharnois
- Succeeded by: Gérard Bruchési

Mayor of Valleyfield, Quebec
- In office 1960–1968
- Preceded by: Louis Quevillon
- Succeeded by: O.E. Caza

Personal details
- Born: 10 September 1900 La Malbaie, Quebec, Canada
- Died: 17 December 1980 (aged 80)
- Party: Liberal
- Profession: stenographer

Robert Cauchon CM (10 September 1900 – 17 December 1980) was a Liberal party member of the House of Commons of Canada.

Cauchon was born in La Malbaie, Quebec and became a stenographer. He became an alderman of Valleyfield, Quebec in 1943. The following year, he became the municipality's mayor of that municipality and remained in that role until 1947.

After an unsuccessful attempt to win the Beauharnois—Laprairie riding in the 1945 federal election, Cauchon won a Parliamentary seat in the 1949 election at Beauharnois riding. He was re-elected to a second term in 1949, then with a riding change to Beauharnois—Salaberry he was re-elected to Parliament in 1953 and 1957. In the 1958 election, Cauchon was defeated by Gérard Bruchési of the Progressive Conservative party.

Cauchon became a member of the Order of Canada in 1977, based on his contributions to community management in Canada and his work to promote industry in his home community of Valleyfield, including his role as president of the Valleyfield Port Corporation. He died aged 80.

1949 Canadian federal election: Beauharnois
Party	Candidate	Votes	%	±%
Liberal	Robert Cauchon	11,631		
Progressive Conservative	Joseph Primeau	4,547		
Union des électeurs	Gilbert Rondeau	397		
