= Jean-Guy Hudon =

Canadian politician

Member of the Canada Parliament for Beauharnois—Salaberry
- In office 1984–1993
- Preceded by: Gérald Laniel
- Succeeded by: Laurent Lavigne

Personal details
- Born: 24 April 1941 (age 85) Sainte-Anne-de-la-Pocatière, Quebec
- Party: Progressive Conservative
- Children: Isabelle Hudon

Jean-Guy Hudon (born 24 April 1941) was a Progressive Conservative member of the House of Commons of Canada from 1984 to 1993. He was an administrator by career.

Born in Sainte-Anne-de-la-Pocatière, Québec, Hudon represented the Quebec riding of Beauharnois—Salaberry, where he was first elected in the 1984 federal election and re-elected in 1988, therefore becoming a member in the 33rd and 34th Canadian Parliaments.

Jean-Guy Hudon is the father of Isabelle Hudon, Canadian Ambassador to France and Monaco from 2017 to 2021, and President and CEO of the Business Development Bank of Canada since 2021.
