= Daniel Turp =

Canadian politician (born 1955)

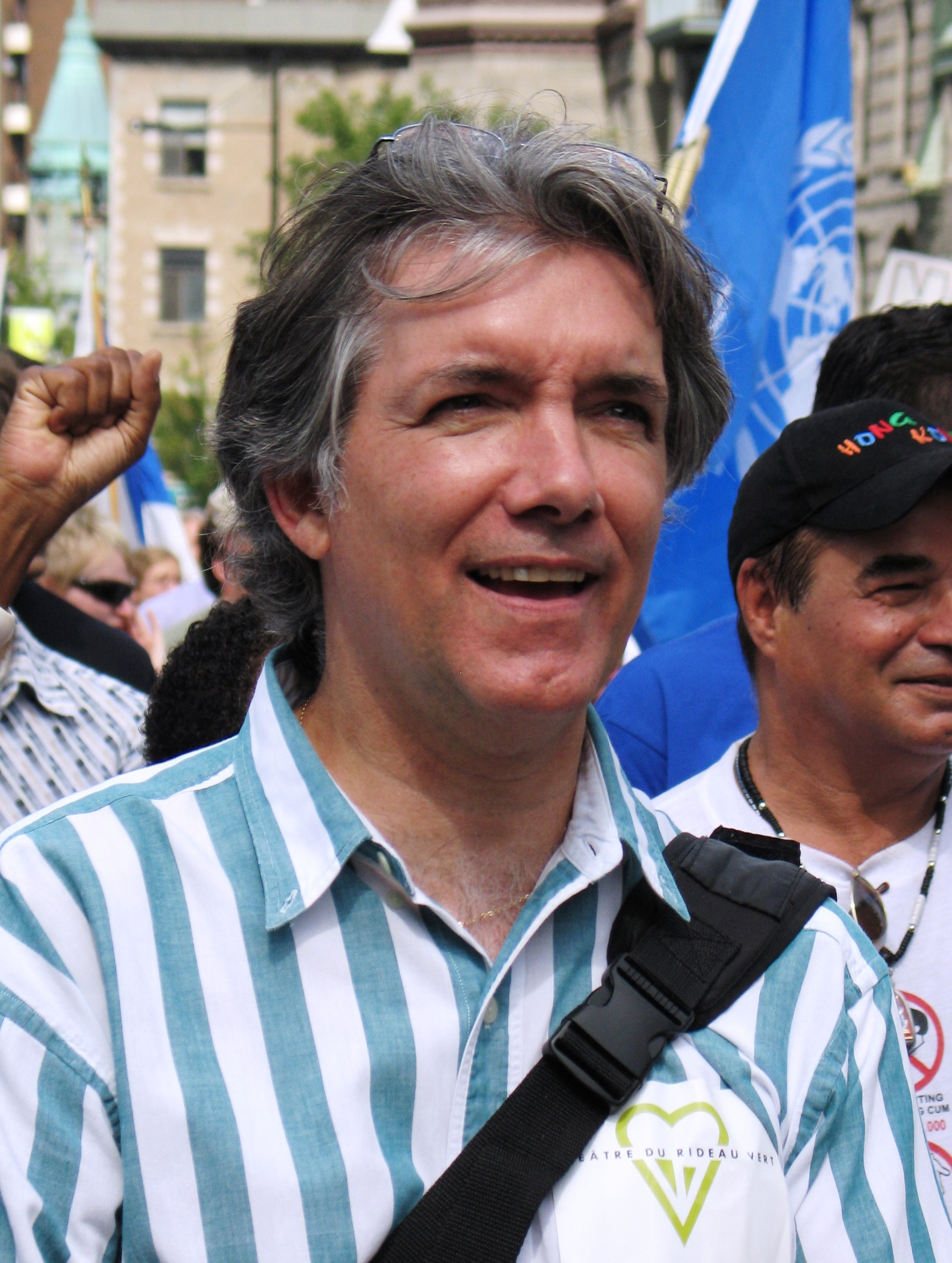

Member of Parliament for Beauharnois—Salaberry
- In office 1997–2000
- Preceded by: Laurent Lavigne
- Succeeded by: Serge Marcil

MNA for Mercier
- In office May 1, 2003 – November 5, 2008
- Preceded by: Nathalie Rochefort
- Succeeded by: Amir Khadir

Personal details
- Born: April 30, 1955 (age 71) Verdun, Quebec, Canada
- Party: Bloc Québécois; Parti Québécois

Daniel Turp (born April 30, 1955) is a professor of constitutional and international law at the Université de Montréal in Montreal, Quebec, Canada. He served as a Bloc Québécois member of Parliament from 1997 to 2000 and as a Parti Québécois member of the Quebec National Assembly from 2003 to 2008.

== Early life and education ==
Born in Montreal, Quebec, Turp was raised as a Roman Catholic but later converted to Presbyterianism. He is a member of the Church of St. Andrew and St. Paul in Montreal.

Turp studied law at the Université de Montréal and the University of Ottawa, and received his legal licence in Sherbrooke, Quebec in 1977. He earned a master's degree at the Université de Montréal in 1978. He has worked for the Canadian International Development Agency.

Turp started teaching at the Université de Montréal in 1982. Since then, he has taught several law courses at the University of Paris X (1986–1996), The International Institute of Human Rights in Strasbourg (1988) and Harvard University (1996). He has also been a director of studies at the international law academy in The Hague (1995).

After lengthy studies, he obtained a doctorate in law at Panthéon-Assas University in 1990.

== Political engagement ==
Turp joined the Bloc Québécois, becoming that party's Political Affairs Committee president during Prime Minister Jean Chrétien's first term in office. He was defeated in the Papineau-Saint-Michel electoral district in 1996 when he first attempted to become a federal Member of Parliament. He succeeded in 1997, becoming a member of the House of Commons of Canada for the Beauharnois—Salaberry riding. He left federal politics in 2000 after being defeated by Liberal Serge Marcil.

In 2003, he moved to provincial politics under the Parti Québécois and was elected in the riding of Mercier on April 14. Turp became the party spokesman on international relations and sat on the Parliamentary Assembly of la Francophonie.

In 2005, he proposed a project for a Quebec constitution and he signed the Manifeste pour un Québec solidaire (Manifesto for Quebec solidarity). He has published many articles on Quebec sovereignty and its constitutional implications.

Turp supported André Boisclair during the Parti Québécois' party leadership campaign in 2005, and was re-elected in the 2007 election. He faced some criticism in 2008 as one of two MNAs, along with Pierre Curzi, who endorsed a controversial petition opposing Paul McCartney's performance at Quebec City's 400th anniversary celebrations.

He was defeated in 2008 by Amir Khadir, co-leader of Québec solidaire.

In 2011, Turp unsuccessfully ran for president of the Parti Québécois.

== Publications ==
- 1995: L'Avant projet de loi sur la souveraineté : texte annoté, Cowansville, Les Éditions Yvon Blais.
- 2000: La nation bâillonnée : le plan B ou l'offensive d'Ottawa contre le Québec, Montreal, VLB éditeur.
- 2001: Le droit de choisir : Essais sur le droit du Québec à disposer de lui-même/The Right to Choose : Essays of Québec's Right to Self-Determination, Montreal. Éditions Thémis
- 2005: Nous, peuple du Québec : un projet de constitution du Québec. Sainte-Foy, Éditions du Québécois.

Collaborations

- 1986: G. Beaudoin (dir.), Perspectives canadiennes et européennes des droits de la personne, Cowansville, Éditions Yvon Blais.
- 1995: Brossard, J. and D. Turp, L'accession à la souveraineté et le cas du Québec : conditions et modalités politico-juridiques, 2nd edition (with supplement), Montreal, PUM.
- 1996: Debard, T., J. Schmidt, V. Nabhan and D. Turp, La régulation juridique des espaces économiques : interactions GATT/OMC, Union européenne et ALÉNA, Lyon, Centre Jaques-Cartier.
- 1997: Morin, J.-Y., Rigaldies and D. Turp, Droit international public : notes et documents, Montreal, Les Éditions Thémis, 3rd edition (2 volumes).
- 1998: Schabas, W. and D. Turp, Droit international, canadien et québécois des droits et libertés : notes et documents, Cowansville, Les Éditions Yvon Blais, 2nd edition.
