= Salaberry-Soulanges =

Coordinates: 45.249°N 74.156°W

Quebec electoral district

Defunct provincial electoral district
- Legislature: National Assembly of Quebec
- District created: 1988
- District abolished: 2001
- First contested: 1989
- Last contested: 1998

Salaberry-Soulanges (French pronunciation: [salabɛʁi sulɑ̃ʒ]) was a former provincial electoral district in the Montérégie region of Quebec, Canada. It was located to the southwest of the island of Montreal.

It was created for the 1989 election from parts of the former Vaudreuil-Soulanges and Beauharnois electoral districts. Its final election was in 1998. It disappeared in the 2003 election as its territory was divided between the new electoral districts of Soulanges and (the newly recreated) Beauharnois.

== Members of the National Assembly ==
Legislature	Years	Member	Party
Riding created from Vaudreuil-Soulanges and Beauharnois
34th	1989–1994	Serge Marcil	Liberal
35th	1994–1998	Serge Deslières	Parti Québécois
36th	1998–2003	Serge Deslières	Parti Québécois
Dissolved into Soulanges and Beauharnois
