= Alain Boire =

Canadian politician

Alain Boire (born June 23, 1971) is a Quebec politician.

Born in Montreal, Quebec, Boire was a Bloc Québécois member of the House of Commons of Canada. He represented the district of Beauharnois—Salaberry from 2004 to 2006. He was the Bloc critic of Youth. He is a former businessman, electrician and technician. He lost his nomination for the 2006 election.

Parliament of Canada
Preceded by Serge Marcil, Liberal	Member of Parliament for Beauharnois—Salaberry; 2004–2006	Succeeded by Claude DeBellefeuille, Bloc Québécois
