= Bartesian =

Manufacturer of cocktail machines and capsules

- Type: Private
- Industry: Home appliances
- Founded: 2014
- Headquarters: Chicago, Illinois, U.S.
- Area served: North America
- Key people: Ryan Close (CEO)
- Products: Capsule-based cocktail machines Single-serve cocktail capsules
- Website: bartesian.com

Bartesian is a Chicago-based company that manufactures capsule-based cocktail machines for home and commercial use. The company operates on a razor-and-blade business model, selling automated cocktail makers that require proprietary single-use capsules containing non-alcoholic bitters, liquors, and juices.

== History ==
The concept for an automated cocktail machine originated in the 2010s, when engineering students Bryan Fedorak and Jason Neevel began developing a capsule-based cocktail machine at the University of Waterloo. Their early prototypes retrofitted domestic coffee machines to dispense mixed drinks using pre-measured ingredients. In 2014, Fedorak partnered with Ryan Close to found Bartesian and commercialize the product. They launched a Kickstarter campaign in 2014 that raised $115,000 to cover early production costs.

The founders appeared on the Canadian television series Dragons’ Den in 2016. Although the on-air deal did not close, the appearance led to new discussions with liquor distributors and ultimately to a branding and licensing agreement with Beam Suntory Inc. This partnership enabled final assembly of the first production units in Kitchener, Ontario. The first units were delivered to Kickstarter backers in 2017.

In 2018 Bartesian entered into a manufacturing and marketing agreement with Hamilton Beach Brands to distribute its cocktail machines in the United States and Canada. Bartesian officially released its product to the public through its direct-to-consumer (D2C) website in September 2019.

During the COVID-19 pandemic, demand for at-home cocktail preparation increased. In response to global supply chain disruptions that affected capsule production, Bartesian relocated its headquarters from Ontario to Chicago and established a capsule-manufacturing facility near Chicago to reduce dependence on overseas suppliers.

In 2021 Bartesian closed a US$20 million funding round led by Cleveland Avenue LLC, the Chicago-based venture firm founded by former McDonald's CEO Don Thompson, with continuing investment from Beam Suntory. At the time, Bartesian had 10 employees. Hyatt Hotels president Pete Sears joined the board, and Bartesian began marketing its machines as minibar replacements at select Hyatt properties.

By 2022, Bartesian had expanded its workforce and installed machines at venues such as Fenway Park, Dodger Stadium, and Wrigley Field, as well as American Airlines airport lounges. The company's capsule technology was later integrated into Black + Decker's Bev machine.

== Products ==
The machines combine user-supplied spirits with capsules containing juices, bitters, and flavourings for creating cocktails. Users can select drink strength or choose a non-alcoholic option.

Reportedly, approximately 60 capsule varieties were available as of 2024.
