= Anne Minh-Thu Quach =

Canadian politician

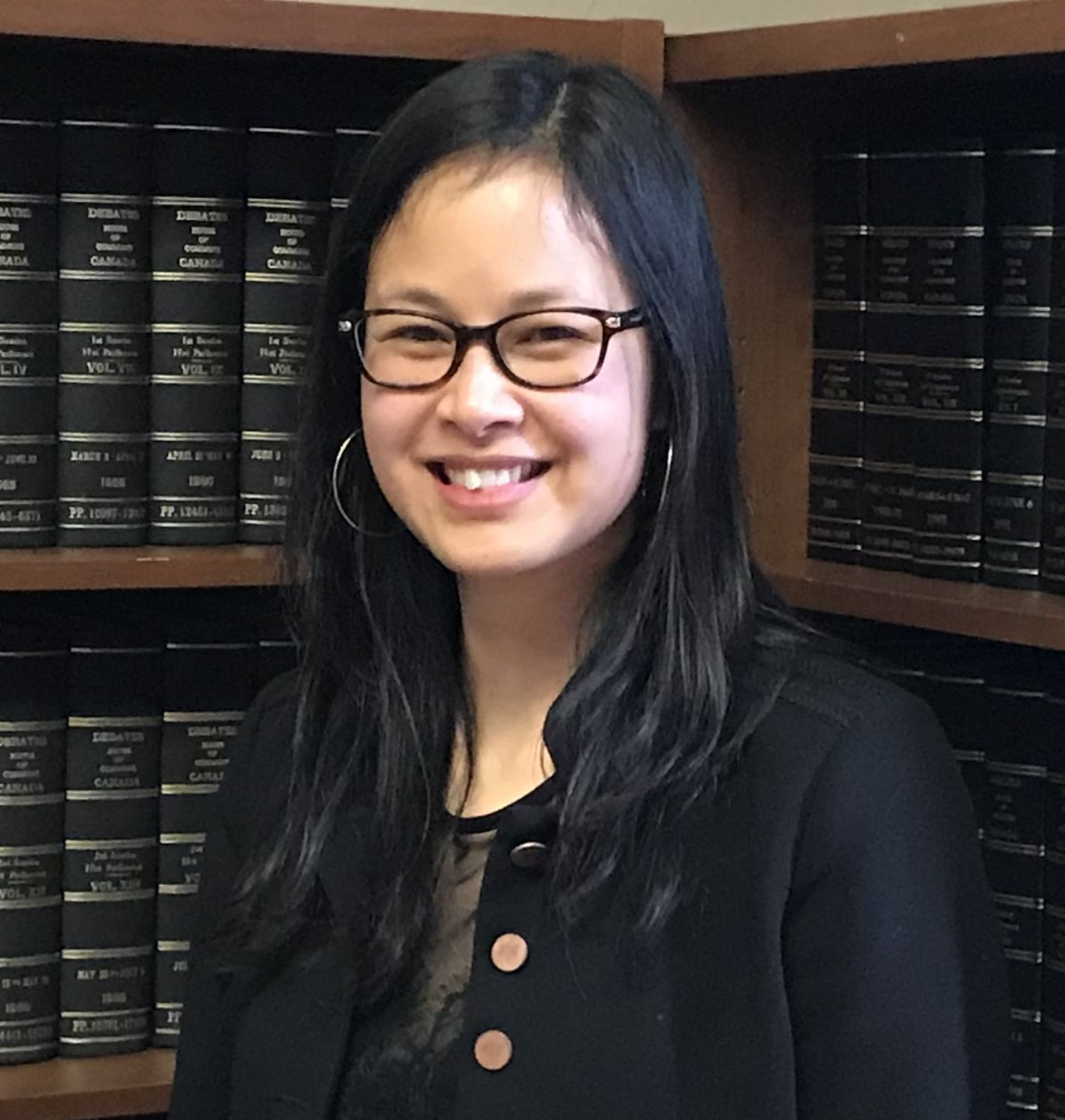
- Minh-Thu Quach in March 2018

Member of Parliament
- In office October 19, 2015 – September 11, 2019
- Preceded by: riding created
- Succeeded by: Claude DeBellefeuille
- Constituency: Salaberry—Suroît
- In office 2011–2015
- Preceded by: Claude DeBellefeuille
- Succeeded by: riding abolished
- Constituency: Beauharnois—Salaberry

Personal details
- Born: August 14, 1982 (age 44) Salaberry-de-Valleyfield, Quebec, Canada
- Party: New Democratic Party
- Spouse: Mathieu Dube (m. 2013)

Anne Minh-Thu Quach (born August 14, 1982) is a Canadian politician who represented the electoral district of Salaberry—Suroît in the House of Commons of Canada from 2011 to 2019. She served as a member of the New Democratic Party.

== Early life and education ==
Born in Salaberry-de-Valleyfield, Quebec, Quach received a diploma in health sciences from the Cégep de Valleyfield in 2001 and a bachelor's degree in secondary education from the Université de Sherbrooke in 2005.

== Educational career ==
She taught French at École Edgar-Hébert for five years and another short stint from August 2010 to May 2011 at École Baie-St-François. Very active in the Syndicat de l'enseignement de Champlain, the regional teachers union that includes Longueuil, she served for three years on its executive committee and represented it on the general council of the Centrale des Syndicats du Québec, the union central that includes over 100,000 teachers and about 75,000 other employees in health, social services, community, culture and recreation.

== Political career ==
Elected in 2011, she is one of three Vietnamese Canadians to have been elected to the House of Commons, following Ève-Mary Thaï Thi Lac and alongside Hoang Mai.

== Personal life ==
Quach speaks French and English. She is married and has a daughter who was born in 2014.

== Electoral record ==
2015 Canadian federal election: Salaberry—Suroît
Party	Candidate	Votes	%	±%	Expenditures
New Democratic	Anne Minh-Thu Quach	18,726	30.43	-13.17	–
Liberal	Robert Sauvé	17,955	29.18	+21.04	–
Bloc Québécois	Claude DeBellefeuille	17,452	28.36	-5.39	–
Conservative	Albert De Martin	6,132	9.97	-2.72	–
Green	Nicola-Silverado Socrates	867	1.41	-0.43	–
Independent	Sylvain Larocque	219	0.36	n/a	–
Strength in Democracy	Patricia Domingos	184	0.30	n/a	–
Total valid votes/expense limit		61,535	100.00		$233,770.86
Total rejected ballots		998	1.60	–	
Turnout		92,280	67.76	–	
Eligible voters		92,280			
New Democratic hold		Swing		-17.11	
Source: Elections Canada

2011 Canadian federal election: Beauharnois—Salaberry
Party	Candidate	Votes	%	±%	Expenditures
New Democratic	Anne Minh-Thu Quach	23,978	43.78	+32.22	–
Bloc Québécois	Claude DeBellefeuille	18,182	33.20	-16.86	–
Conservative	David Couturier	7,049	12.87	-7.37	–
Liberal	François Deslandres	4,559	8.32	-6.55	–
Green	Rémi Pelletier	1,003	1.83	-1.45	–
Total valid votes/expense limit		54,771	100.00	–	
Total rejected ballots		778	1.40	–	
Turnout		55,569	62.34	–	
Eligible voters		89,141	–	–	
New Democratic gain from Bloc Québécois		Swing		+24.54	

2008 Canadian federal election: Beauharnois—Salaberry
Party	Candidate	Votes	%	±%	Expenditures
Bloc Québécois	Claude DeBellefeuille	26,904	50.06	+2.53	$57,397
Conservative	Dominique Bellemare	10,858	20.20	-6.31	$85,410
Liberal	Maria Lopez	7,995	14.87	-0.14	$6,993
New Democratic	Anne Minh-Thu Quach	6,214	11.56	+4.01	$2,272
Green	David Smith	1,764	3.28	-0.10	$5,184
Total valid votes/expense limit		53,735	100.00	$89,601	
Bloc Québécois hold		Swing		-4.52	
