= Business Development Bank of Canada =

Bank in Canada

- Type: Crown corporation
- Industry: Development banking Consulting
- Founded: 1944 in Montreal, Quebec, Canada
- Headquarters: Place Ville Marie; Montreal, Quebec, Canada
- Key people: Isabelle Hudon (President and CEO); Mike Pedersen (Chair)
- Total assets: $30.6 billion (2019)
- Number of employees: 2,300 (2019)
- Website: www.bdc.ca

The Business Development Bank of Canada (BDC; French: Banque de développement du Canada) is a Crown corporation and national development bank wholly owned by the Government of Canada, mandated to help create and develop Canadian businesses through financing, growth and transition capital, venture capital and advisory services, with a focus on small and medium-sized enterprises.

Founded in 1944, BDC is headquartered in Montreal. BDC operates a national network of approximately 109 business centres and serves more than 107,000 entrepreneurs, both directly and through partners. BDC's debt obligations, secured by the Government of Canada, are issued to public and private sector institutions.

== History ==
The bank was established by an Act of Parliament as the Industrial Development Bank (IDB) in September 1944. IDB was initially an arm of the Bank of Canada, and the Governor of the Bank was also Chief Executive Officer of the IDB. During its first years, the bank's main role was to help small "industrial enterprises" convert from military production to peacetime operations after World War II. IDB was one of the first and largest development banks in the world.

The Industrial Development Bank Act was first amended in 1952 to allow the bank to offer financing to companies in the commercial airlines industry. By the mid-1950s, one in ten planes in Canada was financed by IDB. Later, the Industrial Development Bank Act was amended twice more to allow the bank to lend to companies in almost all industries.

By 1964, 20 years after its foundation, IDB had 22 branches across Canada, covering main cities such as Halifax, Montreal, Toronto, Winnipeg, Calgary and Vancouver, including operations in relatively rural areas. In the mid-1970s, the bank added consulting and training to its financial offerings to help entrepreneurs better manage their businesses.

In 1975, its name was changed to Federal Business Development Bank (FBDB), and its venture capital operations were started. At the time, the bank was known as "a lender of last resort"—supporting businesses in difficulty.

In 1995, the Business Development Bank of Canada Act was passed, leading to a new name and mission for the bank. It mandated BDC to promote entrepreneurship, focusing on the needs of small and medium-sized enterprises (SMEs), to fill gaps in the market and maximize financing alternatives for businesses by offering services that were complementary to those available from other financial institutions.

BDC is financially self-sustaining. It paid a total of $1.4 billion in dividends to its sole shareholder, the Government of Canada, from fiscal 2021-2025. On June 8, 2022, BDC’s Board of Director authorized the repurchase of $5.0 billion of its common shares. Every ten years, the Minister of Industry must conduct a review of the provisions and operations of the BDC Act. The last legislative review was completed in December 2014.

In April 2021, the Bank announced the appointment of Isabelle Hudon as President and Chief Executive Officer as of August of the same year, at the end of the term of current CEO Michael Denham. In 2023, current and former staff raised concerns about spending at the bank, including expenditure on consulting services from McKinsey & Company and air transport for a private chauffeur.

== Services ==
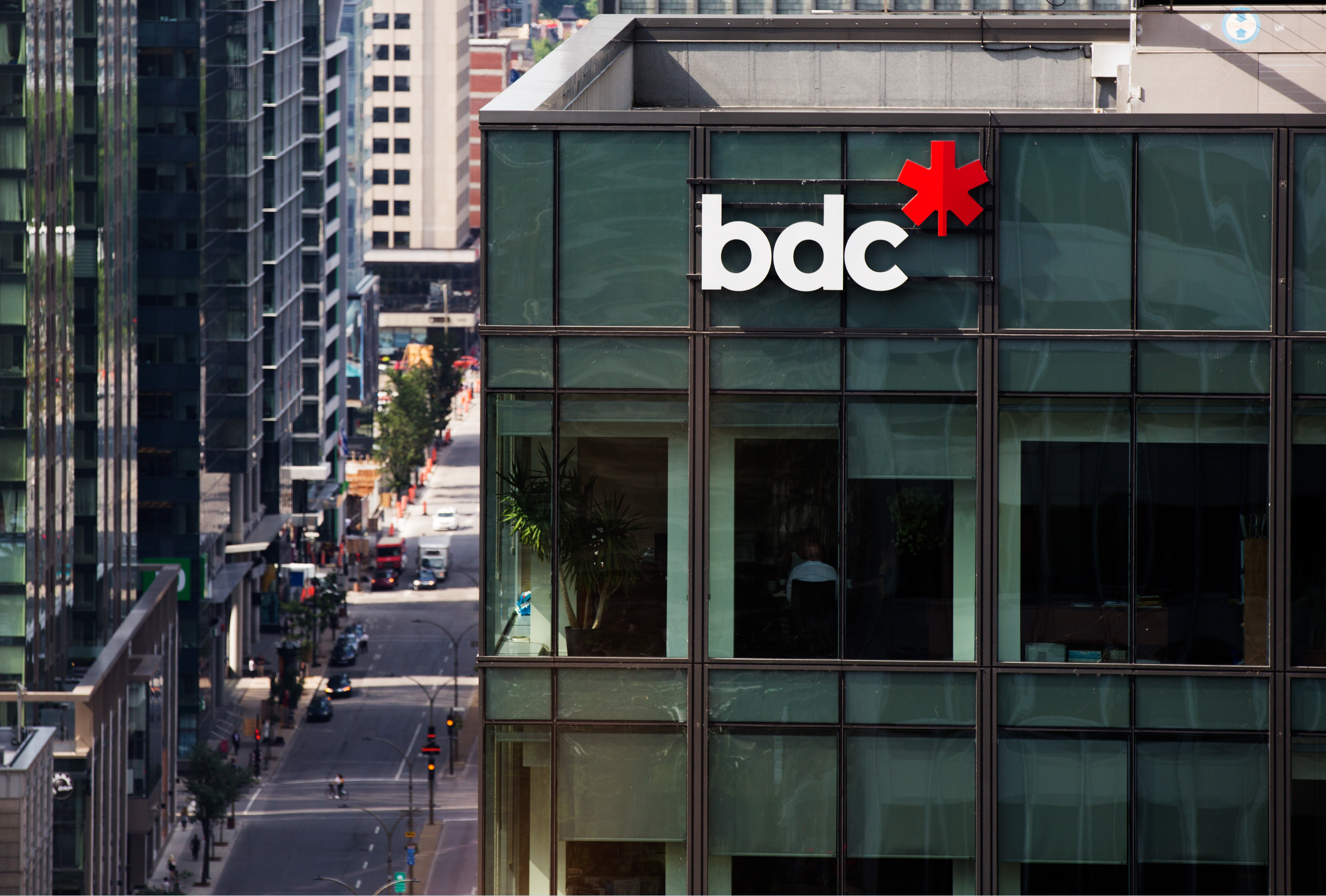
BDC Head Office in Montreal

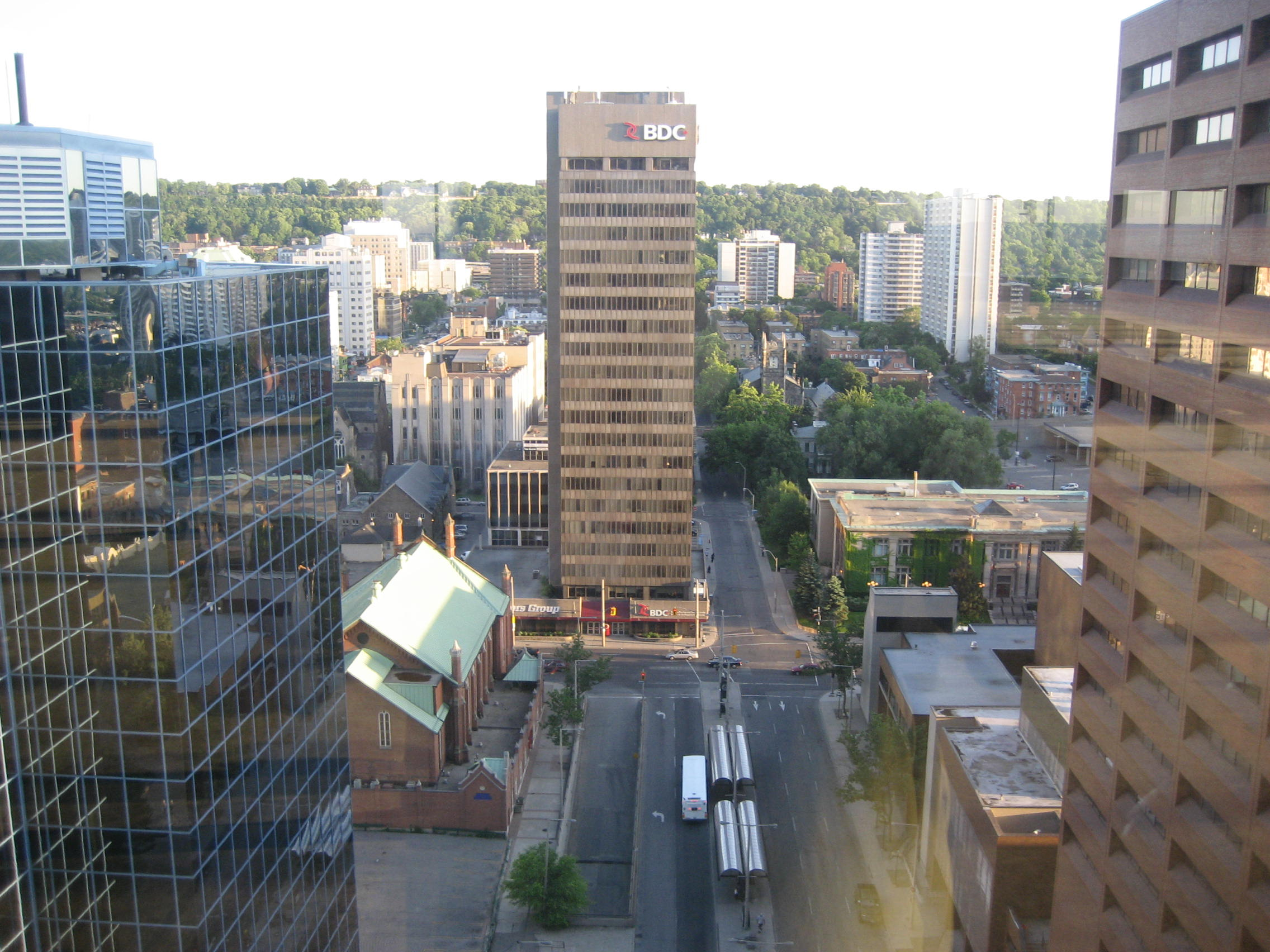
BDC Building, Stelco Tower, Hamilton, Ontario

BDC offers loans and advisory services with a focus on small and medium-sized companies. It reports to Parliament through the Minister of Innovation, Science and Economic Development. BDC Capital, a subsidiary of BDC, offers specialized financing, including venture capital, equity as well as growth and business transition capital.

BDC's Venture Capital arm makes strategic investments in Canadian companies through its Energy/Cleantech Fund, Healthcare Fund and IT Fund. Notable investments include GradeSlam, Q1 Labs, Radian6, Canopy Labs, D-Wave Systems, CoolIT Systems, Protiva Biotherapeutics, Sanctuary AI and Klipfolio Dashboard.

BDC is a complementary lender, offering commercial loans and investments that fill out or complete services available from private-sector financial institutions. It also provides advice to businesses through its advisory services division.

Launched by FBDB in 1979, Small Business Week is a yearly celebration of entrepreneurs and their contribution to Canadian society. It became a nationwide event in 1981.

== Tax Exemption ==
BDC is exempt from taxes imposed by the Income Tax Act.

== Legislative Review and Criticism ==
The legislative review of the Bank in 2023 by ISED reported stakeholder sentiments and some indicators highlighting that: "the BDC is conservative in its lending and other practices. For example, many stakeholders emphasized that the BDC was not meeting their expectations for a higher risk appetite relative to the private sector, while the BDC’s debt-to-equity ratio is significantly below the maximum limit prescribed by the BDC Act and declined from the previous Legislative Review Period."

== Certification and Recognition ==
In 2013, BDC became the first Canadian financial institution to be certified as a B Corporation. It has since renewed this certification, reflecting its commitment to broader social and environmental performance. BDC was named among Canada's Top 100 employers from 2007 to 2018.

BDC Capital won multiple Deal of the Year Awards from the Canadian Venture Capital and Private Equity Association in the venture capital category. It won in 2011, for its investment in Radian6 Technologies Inc.; in 2012, for its investment in Q1 Labs Inc.; and again in 2014, for its investment in Layer 7 Technologies.

== See also ==
- BDC Young Entrepreneur Award
- List of national development banks
- Canada Innovation Corporation
