= Beauharnois—Salaberry =

Former federal electoral district in Quebec, Canada

Coordinates: 45.117°N 73.964°W

Quebec electoral district
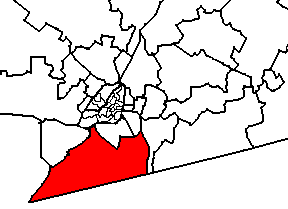
- Beauharnois—Salaberry in relation to other Quebec federal electoral districts

Defunct federal electoral district
- Legislature: House of Commons
- District created: 1947
- District abolished: 2012
- First contested: 1949
- Last contested: 2011
- District webpage: profile, map

Demographics
- Population (2011): 109,381
- Electors (2011): 86,431
- Area (km²): 2,447.99
- Census division(s): Beauharnois-Salaberry RCM, Le Haut-Saint-Laurent RCM, Les Jardins-de-Napierville RCM
- Census subdivision(s): Beauharnois, Hinchinbrooke, Huntingdon, Napierville, Ormstown, Saint-Anicet, Saint-Chrysostome, Saint-Rémi, Sainte-Martine, Salaberry-de-Valleyfield, Akwesasne Reserve

Beauharnois—Salaberry (French pronunciation: [boaʁnwa salabɛʁi]) is a former federal electoral district in Quebec, Canada, that was represented in the House of Commons of Canada from 1949 to 2015.

== Geography ==
In 2003, the riding was redefined to consist of the regional county municipalities of Beauharnois—Salaberry, Les Jardins-de-Napierville, and Le Haut-Saint-Laurent, including the parts of Akwesasne Indian Reserve No. 15 that lie within Quebec. In the 2006 census 88.7% of its population reported French only as their home language, 9.3% English (mostly in Le Haut-Saint-Laurent).

The neighbouring ridings were Stormont—Dundas—South Glengarry, Vaudreuil—Soulanges, Châteauguay—Saint-Constant, Brossard—La Prairie, and Saint-Jean.

== History ==
Beauharnois riding was created in the British North America Act 1867. Beauharnois was merged into Beauharnois—Laprairie in 1932.

In 1947, Beauharnois riding was re-created from Beauharnois—Laprairie and Châteauguay—Huntingdon.

In 1952, it became Beauharnois—Salaberry.

- See Beauharnois for information on the riding prior to 1952.

The name of the riding was changed back to Beauharnois from 1966 to 1971, and from 1976 to 1977. The rest of time it was known as "Beauharnois—Salaberry" as it is known as today.

In 1952, Beauharnois—Salaberry consisted of the county of Beauharnois, the cities of Salaberry-de-Valley field and Beauharnois and the town of Maple Grove, the municipality of Saint-Joachim-de-Châteauguay, the towns of Châteauguay, Châteauguay Heights, and De Léry, and the municipalities of Saint-Anicet and Sainte Barbe.

Beauharnois—Salaberry was abolished in 1966 and redistributed between Beauharnois electoral district and La Prairie (federal electoral district)

Beauharnois—Salaberry was re-created in 1971 when Beauharnois was renamed. It consisted of the Cities of Beauharnois and Salaberry-de-Valleyfield, the Towns of Huntingdon and Maple Grove, the County of Beauharnois, and parts of the Counties of Châteauguay and Huntingdon.

Beauharnois—Salaberry was abolished in 1976, and redistributed between Beauharnois and Châteauguay (federal electoral district), but in 1977, before any election was held, Beauharnois was renamed as Beauharnois—Salaberry. It consisted of the Cities of Beauharnois and Salaberry-de-Valleyfield, the Towns of Huntingdon and Maple Grove, and parts of the Counties of Beauharnois, Châteauguay and Huntingdon.

In 1987, the riding was redefined to consist of the towns of Beauharnois, Huntingdon, Léry, Maple Grove and Salaberry-de-Valleyfield, the counties of Beauharnois and Huntingdon, and the County of Châteauguay excluding the towns of Châteauguay and Mercier.

In 1996, the riding was redefined to consist of the cities of Beauharnois, Huntingdon, Maple Grove and Salaberry-de-Valleyfield, and the County Regional Municipalities of Beauharnois—Salaberry, Le Haut-Saint-Laurent (including that part of the Akwesasne Indian Reserve contained in the Province of Quebec) and Les Jardins-de-Napierville, excepting: the City of Saint-Rémi; the parish municipalities of Saint-Édouard, Saint-Jacques-le-Mineur and Saint-Michel.

It was abolished for the 2015 election.

=== Members of Parliament ===
This riding has elected the following members of Parliament:

Parliament	Years	Member	Party
Beauharnois—Salaberry; Riding created from Beauharnois
22nd	1953–1957	Robert Cauchon	Liberal
23rd	1957–1958	Robert Cauchon	Liberal
24th	1958–1962	Gérard Bruchési	Progressive Conservative
25th	1962–1963	Gérald Laniel	Liberal
26th	1963–1965	Gérald Laniel	Liberal
27th	1965–1968	Gérald Laniel	Liberal
Beauharnois
28th	1968–1972	Gérald Laniel	Liberal
Beauharnois—Salaberry
29th	1972–1974	Gérald Laniel	Liberal
30th	1974–1979	Gérald Laniel	Liberal
31st	1979–1980	Gérald Laniel	Liberal
32nd	1980–1984	Gérald Laniel	Liberal
33rd	1984–1988	Jean-Guy Hudon	Progressive Conservative
34th	1988–1993	Jean-Guy Hudon	Progressive Conservative
35th	1993–1997	Laurent Lavigne	Bloc Québécois
36th	1997–2000	Daniel Turp	Bloc Québécois
37th	2000–2004	Serge Marcil	Liberal
38th	2004–2006	Alain Boire	Bloc Québécois
39th	2006–2008	Claude DeBellefeuille	Bloc Québécois
40th	2008–2011	Claude DeBellefeuille	Bloc Québécois
41st	2011–2015	Anne Minh-Thu Quach	New Democratic
Riding dissolved into Salaberry—Suroît and Châteauguay—Lacolle

== Electoral history ==
=== Beauharnois—Salaberry 1971–2015 ===
2011 Canadian federal election
Party	Candidate	Votes	%	±%	Expenditures
New Democratic	Anne Minh-Thu Quach	23,978	43.78	+32.22	–
Bloc Québécois	Claude DeBellefeuille	18,182	33.20	-16.86	–
Conservative	David Couturier	7,049	12.87	-7.37	–
Liberal	François Deslandres	4,559	8.32	-6.55	–
Green	Rémi Pelletier	1,003	1.83	-1.45	–
Total valid votes/expense limit		54,771	100.00	–	
Total rejected ballots		778	1.40	–	
Turnout		55,569	62.34	–	
Eligible voters		89,141	–	–	
New Democratic gain from Bloc Québécois		Swing		+24.54	

2008 Canadian federal election
Party	Candidate	Votes	%	±%	Expenditures
Bloc Québécois	Claude DeBellefeuille	26,904	50.06	+2.53	$57,397
Conservative	Dominique Bellemare	10,858	20.20	-6.31	$85,410
Liberal	Maria Lopez	7,995	14.87	-0.14	$6,993
New Democratic	Anne Minh-Thu Quach	6,214	11.56	+4.01	$2,272
Green	David Smith	1,764	3.28	-0.10	$5,184
Total valid votes/expense limit		53,735	100.00	$89,601	
Bloc Québécois hold		Swing		-4.52	

2006 Canadian federal election
Party	Candidate	Votes	%	±%	Expenditures
Bloc Québécois	Claude DeBellefeuille	26,190	47.53	-3.1	$51,521
Conservative	David Couturier	14,609	26.51	+17.3	$7,923
Liberal	John Khawand	8,272	15.01	-19.6	$80,914
New Democratic	Cynthia Roy	4,163	7.55	+5.6	$6,039
Green	David Smith	1,864	3.38	+0.7	
Total valid votes/expense limit		55,098	100.00	$82,960	

2004 Canadian federal election
Party	Candidate	Votes	%	±%	Expenditures
Bloc Québécois	Alain Boire	26,775	50.7	+8.3	$40,737
Liberal	Serge Marcil	18,293	34.6	-13.6	$66,136
Conservative	Dominique Bellemare	4,864	9.2	+1.3	$56,391
Green	Rémi Pelletier	1,415	2.7	–	$30
New Democratic	Ligy Alakkattussery	1,018	1.9	+0.5	$252
Marijuana	Félix Malboeuf	480	0.9	–	
Total valid votes/expense limit		52,845	100.0	$81,152	

Note: Conservative vote is compared to the total of the Canadian Alliance vote and Progressive Conservative vote in 2000 election.

2000 Canadian federal election
Party	Candidate	Votes	%	±%
Liberal	Serge Marcil	23,834	48.3	+14.8
Bloc Québécois	Daniel Turp	20,938	42.4	+2.7
Progressive Conservative	Roma Myre	2,133	4.3	-21.2
Alliance	Stephane Renaud	1,782	3.6	
New Democratic	Elizabeth Clark	703	1.4	+0.2
Total valid votes		49,390	100.0	

1997 Canadian federal election
Party	Candidate	Votes	%	±%
Bloc Québécois	Daniel Turp	20,449	39.7	-11.7
Liberal	Linda Julien	17,226	33.5	+2.0
Progressive Conservative	Dominique Bellemare	13,160	25.6	+10.3
New Democratic	Erin Runions	652	1.3	-0.7
Total valid votes		51,487	100.0	

1993 Canadian federal election
Party	Candidate	Votes	%	±%
Bloc Québécois	Laurent Lavigne	25,934	51.4	
Liberal	Linda Julien	15,867	31.4	+4.7
Progressive Conservative	Marie-Andrée McSween	7,687	15.2	-43.1
New Democratic	Marc Dubuc	985	2.0	-9.9
Total valid votes		50,473	100.0	

1988 Canadian federal election
Party	Candidate	Votes	%	±%
Progressive Conservative	Jean-Guy Hudon	29,149	58.4	-4.8
Liberal	Linda Julien	13,351	26.7	+0.7
New Democratic	Daniel Payette	5,937	11.9	+5.7
Green	Luc Bergevin	771	1.5	
Rhinoceros	Robert Joseph Hamon	729	1.5	-1.3
Total valid votes		49,937	100.0	

1984 Canadian federal election
Party	Candidate	Votes	%	±%
Progressive Conservative	Jean-Guy Hudon	27,614	63.1	+48.1
Liberal	Jean-Guy Gaudreau	11,395	26.0	-47.1
New Democratic	Gus Callaghan	2,720	6.2	-1.1
Rhinoceros	Réal Le Parfait Gingras	1,216	2.8	
Parti nationaliste	Maurice Vaudrin	798	1.8	
Total valid votes		43,743	100.0	

1980 Canadian federal election
Party	Candidate	Votes	%	±%
Liberal	Gérald Laniel	27,476	73.1	+9.3
Progressive Conservative	Camille Gibeault	5,629	15.0	-3.3
New Democratic	Michael Wiltshire	2,738	7.3	+2.7
Social Credit	Claudette Largess	1,017	2.7	-7.6
Independent	Marc Laviolette	410	1.1	
Union populaire	Ls-Dona De O'Hara-Gingras	217	0.6	0.0
Marxist–Leninist	Larry Tansey	77	0.2	
Total valid votes		37,564	100.0	

1979 Canadian federal election
Party	Candidate	Votes	%	±%
Liberal	Gérald Laniel	26,048	63.9	+12.0
Progressive Conservative	Rolland Philie	7,460	18.3	-11.9
Social Credit	Georges Boulanger	4,190	10.3	-0.3
New Democratic	Gilles Gagne	1,866	4.6	+0.1
Rhinoceros	Réal Gingras	967	2.4	
Union populaire	Martine Godard	240	0.6	
Total valid votes		40,771	100.0	

1974 Canadian federal election
Party	Candidate	Votes	%	±%
Liberal	Gérald Laniel	16,828	51.9	+3.5
Progressive Conservative	Laurent Cyr	9,801	30.2	+9.9
Social Credit	Jean-Paul Leduc	3,430	10.6	-12.7
New Democratic	Arthur Brown	1,445	4.5	-3.4
Independent	Guy Fortier	911	2.8	
Total valid votes		32,415	100.0	

1972 Canadian federal election
Party	Candidate	Votes	%	±%
Liberal	Gérald Laniel	16,745	48.4	-1.6
Social Credit	Jean-Paul Leduc	8,061	23.3	+17.6
Progressive Conservative	Armand Miron	7,040	20.4	+1.0
New Democratic	André St-Cyr	2,727	7.9	-3.1
Total valid votes		34,573	100.0	

Note: Social Credit vote is compared to Ralliement créditiste vote in the 1968 election.

=== Beauharnois 1966–1971 ===
1968 Canadian federal election
Party	Candidate	Votes	%	±%
Liberal	Gérald Laniel	17,203	59.8	+9.8
Progressive Conservative	Armand Miron	8,703	30.3	+11.0
Ralliement créditiste	Jean-Paul Poulin	1,764	6.1	+0.4
New Democratic	Joseph-Aurèle Patafie	1,087	3.8	-7.2
Total valid votes		28,757	100.0	

=== Beauharnois—Salaberry 1952–1966 ===
1965 Canadian federal election
Party	Candidate	Votes	%	±%
Liberal	Gérald Laniel	16,145	50.0	-1.3
Progressive Conservative	J.-Clément Le Veque	6,242	19.3	+1.8
Independent	J.-Gérard Banville	4,167	12.9	
New Democratic	John Williams	3,544	11.0	+5.2
Ralliement créditiste	Paul-Emile Asselin	1,847	5.7	-19.6
Rhinoceros	Denis Bosse	321	1.0	
Total valid votes		32,266	100.0	

Note: Ralliement créditiste vote is compared to Social Credit vote in the 1963 election.

1963 Canadian federal election
Party	Candidate	Votes	%	±%
Liberal	Gérald Laniel	15,892	51.3	+8.2
Social Credit	Jean Boyer	7,836	25.3	+4.7
Progressive Conservative	Florian Paiement	5,440	17.6	-18.7
New Democratic	Denis Bosse	1,795	5.8	
Total valid votes		30,963	100.0	

1962 Canadian federal election
Party	Candidate	Votes	%	±%
Liberal	Gérald Laniel	13,290	43.1	-5.2
Progressive Conservative	Gérard Bruchesi	11,175	36.3	-15.4
Social Credit	Paul-Emile Asselin	6,341	20.6	
Total valid votes		30,806	100.0	

1958 Canadian federal election
Party	Candidate	Votes	%	±%
Progressive Conservative	Gérard Bruchési	13,202	51.6	+37.1
Liberal	Robert Cauchon	12,368	48.4	-17.2
Total valid votes		25,570	100.0	

1957 Canadian federal election
Party	Candidate	Votes	%	±%
Liberal	Robert Cauchon	14,030	65.6	-10.4
Independent	Médard Cousineau	4,246	19.9	
Progressive Conservative	Guy Guerard	3,109	14.5	-9.4
Total valid votes		21,385	100.0	

1953 Canadian federal election
Party	Candidate	Votes	%
Liberal	Robert Cauchon	14,269	76.0
Progressive Conservative	Josaphat-H. Demers	4,495	24.0
Total valid votes		18,764	100.0

- See Beauharnois for information on the riding prior to 1952.

== See also ==
- List of Canadian electoral districts
- Historical federal electoral districts of Canada
