= Laurent Lavigne (politician) =

Canadian politician

Member of the Canada Parliament for Beauharnois—Salaberry
- In office 1993–1997
- Preceded by: Jean-Guy Hudon
- Succeeded by: Daniel Turp

Personal details
- Born: 10 August 1935 Montreal, Quebec
- Died: 3 August 2017 (aged 81)
- Party: Bloc Québécois

Laurent Lavigne (10 August 1935 – 3 August 2017) was a member of the House of Commons of Canada from 1993 to 1997. His career has been in teaching and agriculture.

He was elected in the Beauharnois—Salaberry electoral district under the Bloc Québécois party in the 1993 federal election, thus serving in the 35th Canadian Parliament. He did not seek a second term in office and therefore left Canadian politics following the 1997 federal election.

Lavigne was also a member of the National Assembly of Quebec from 1976 to 1985 in Beauharnois. He was a member of the Parti Québécois.

He died on 3 August 2017. He was the first member of the Quebec legislature to have been granted medical aid to die. He was suffering from advanced pancreatic cancer.
