= Isabelle Hudon =

Canadian businesswoman and diplomat (born 1967)

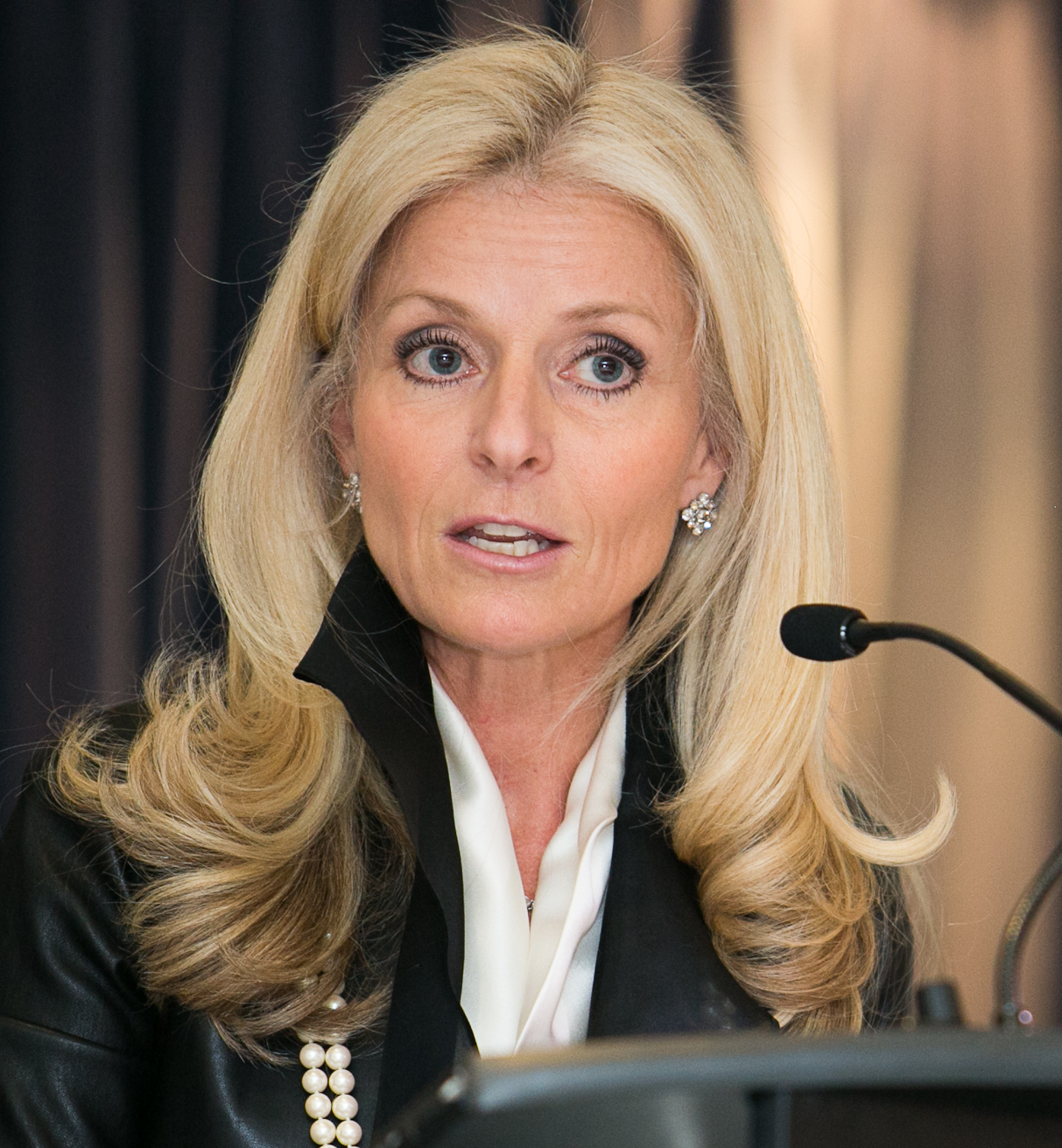
- Occupations: Businesswoman, diplomat

Ambassador of Canada to France and Monaco
- In office September 29, 2017 – July 30, 2021
- Prime Minister: Justin Trudeau
- Preceded by: Lawrence Cannon
- Succeeded by: Stéphane Dion

Isabelle Hudon (born 1967) is a Canadian businesswoman and diplomat. She served as the president and CEO of the Chamber of Commerce of Metropolitan Montreal. In 2008, she became the president of the Montreal-based advertising agency, Marketel, and in August 2010, she was appointed president of Sun Life Financial. in Quebec. From 2017 to 2021, she served as Canadian Ambassador to France and Monaco. She was the first female Canadian Ambassador to France.

In August 2021, she became the first woman to hold the position of president and CEO of the Business Development Bank of Canada.

== Life and career ==
Hudon's mother was a mathematics teacher and her father, Jean-Guy Hudon, was the former mayor of Beauharnois. Hudon worked seven years with her father who was a member of the House of Commons of Canada. In 1990, she became the press attaché of Monique Landry. In 1993, she became the assistant of the former Prime Minister's wife Mila Mulroney (Hudon's husband Paul Smith was the assistant of Brian Mulroney). Her husband moved to Fontainebleau to study at the INSEAD and she followed him there.

She worked in various federal political offices, including in the office of the Minister responsible for the Canadian International Development Agency. She then held strategic positions in the private sector at Bell Global Solutions, the Canadian Space Agency (CSA), Bombardier Aerospace and BCE Media.

Hudon has also sat on the boards of Hydro-Québec, Groupe Marcelle, Holt Renfrew and the Canada Council for the Arts, and is co-founder of L'effet A.

=== Chamber of Commerce of Metropolitain Montreal ===
She joined the Chamber of Commerce of Metropolitan Montreal in 2002 and became Executive Vice-President in 2004. She became president and CEO of the board in 2005, following the departure of Benoit Labonté. She then sat on several boards of directors, and was a regular guest on many Montreal forums.

In 2005, she was named one of Canada's Top 40 Under 40, and in 2006 was recognized as one of Canada's 100 most influential women by Canada's Most Powerful Women: Top 100. In October 2008, she made the announcement that she was leaving the Board of Trade of Metropolitan Montreal to head up the Montreal firm Marketel, where she spent 18 months.

=== Sun Life Financial ===
She was appointed president of Sun Life Financial Quebec in August 2010. During her tenure, the insurer experienced growth in their business in Quebec.

=== Embassy of Canada to France ===
On September 29, 2017, she was appointed as Canadian Ambassador to France and Monaco by Prime Minister Justin Trudeau. She became the first woman to hold this position. She took office on November 6, 2017. In this role, she played a key role in strengthening ties between Canada and France, particularly in the areas of economic, cultural and feminist diplomacy. In June 2018, Hudon served as co-chair of the Gender Equality Advisory Council at the G7 summit meeting in La Malbaie, Quebec.

On October 29, 2019, following the 2019 Canadian federal election, in which the Liberal Party lost seats in Quebec, the Prime Minister's Office announced that Prime Minister Justin Trudeau had hired Hudon as an adviser.

She stepped down from her role of Ambassador on July 30, 2021.

=== Business Development Bank of Canada ===
Hudon became the first female president and CEO of Business Development Bank of Canada (BDC) on August 10, 2021.

Since she took office, BDC has seen the number of business owners it supports reach an all-time high, rising from 72,000 in 2021 to 100,000 in 2023. While maintaining a solid financial performance, the organization has also significantly strengthened its support for greater diversity, equity and inclusion in the Canadian economy.

During her time as president and CEO, BDC launched a $500 million initiative known as the Thrive Venture Fund and Lab for Women, created to support Canadian women-led businesses.

== Board memberships ==
- Hydro-Québec
- Holt Renfrew Canada
- The Mount Royal Club
- The Canada Council for the Arts

== Honours ==
- Named one of the 40 most successful Canadians under the age of 40 (Canada’s Top 40 under 40) in 2005
- Inducted into the Canada’s Most Powerful Women: Top 100 Hall of Fame in 2014 (she was named to this list in 2006, 2012 and 2013)
- Queen Elizabeth II Diamond Jubilee Medal in 2012
- Réalisations award from the Réseau des femmes d’affaires du Québec in 2014
- Medal of the National Assembly of Québec (2016), for her commitment to the cause of women’s ambition
- Honorary degree of Doctor of Law by Concordia University (2017)
- Insignia of the Commander of the Legion of Honour from the French government (2021)
