= Gérard Bruchési =

Canadian politician and insurance broker

Member of the Canadian Parliament for Beauharnois—Salaberry
- In office 1958–1962
- Preceded by: Robert Cauchon
- Succeeded by: Gérald Laniel

Personal details
- Born: March 30, 1931 Montreal, Quebec, Canada
- Died: November 29, 2025 (aged 94)
- Party: Progressive Conservative Party
- Occupation: insurance broker

Gérard Bruchési (March 30, 1931 – November 29, 2025) was a Canadian politician and insurance broker. He was elected to the House of Commons of Canada as a member of the Progressive Conservative Party in the 1958 election to represent the riding of Beauharnois—Salaberry. He was defeated in the 1962 election.

Bruchési was born in Montreal, Quebec.
