= Paper (company) =

Educational technology company

- Website type: Private Company
- Founded: 2014
- Headquarters: Montreal, Quebec, Canada
- Founders: Phil Cutler; Roberto Cipriani
- CEO: Martina Tam
- Industry: Educational Technology, e-learning,
- Products: High-Impact Tutoring, On-Demand Tutoring
- Website: paper.co

Paper is an educational technology company that provides virtual tutoring. It is headquartered in Montreal, Quebec.

== History ==
Originally named GradeSlam, Paper was founded in 2014 by McGill University graduates Philip Cutler and Roberto Cipriani. It was the 21st fastest-growing company in Canada in 2020.

In June 2021, the company reported that over 1 million students used the platform, and it employed 1000 tutors and 130 staff.

Officials in New Mexico canceled a contract with Paper in 2023 after finding that its services were not providing adequate academic help to students. Officials from the New Mexico Public Education Department and other school districts stated that Paper had given them the impression that students were working one-on-one with tutors and were unaware that tutors were in fact handling multiple students at once.

In 2022, Paper acquired Figure Math. In 2023, Paper acquired career and college readiness platform MajorClarity and AI-based reading software provider Readlee.

In 2023, due to reduced pandemic funding being provided to school districts, Paper's revenue and bookings significantly lagged expectations. This resulted in multiple rounds of layoffs that year, which saw the dismissal of 45% of its headquarters staff and all of its tutors in Canada.

As of 2023, the company had raised $389.6 million dollars in funding from investors.

== Overview ==
Paper provides virtual chat-based tutoring. This typically involves tutors working with multiple students at the same time, as a cost-saving measure, despite its claims of providing 1:1 tutoring. In some cases, the schools and districts Paper contracts with are unaware of this practice. The company pays tutors extra when they work with four or more students at the same time. According to the company's records, tutors spend 45% of their time working with two or more students at once.

Paper's Review Center feature allows students to submit written work to be reviewed and given annotated feedback by a writing-specific tutor with the aim of helping students advance writing skills. Tutors are advised to spend no more than 30 minutes per assignment regardless of its length; to meet the time limit, some tutors say they copy pre-written feedback on assignments.
