= Sainte-Barbe, Quebec =

Sainte-Barbe
- Municipality
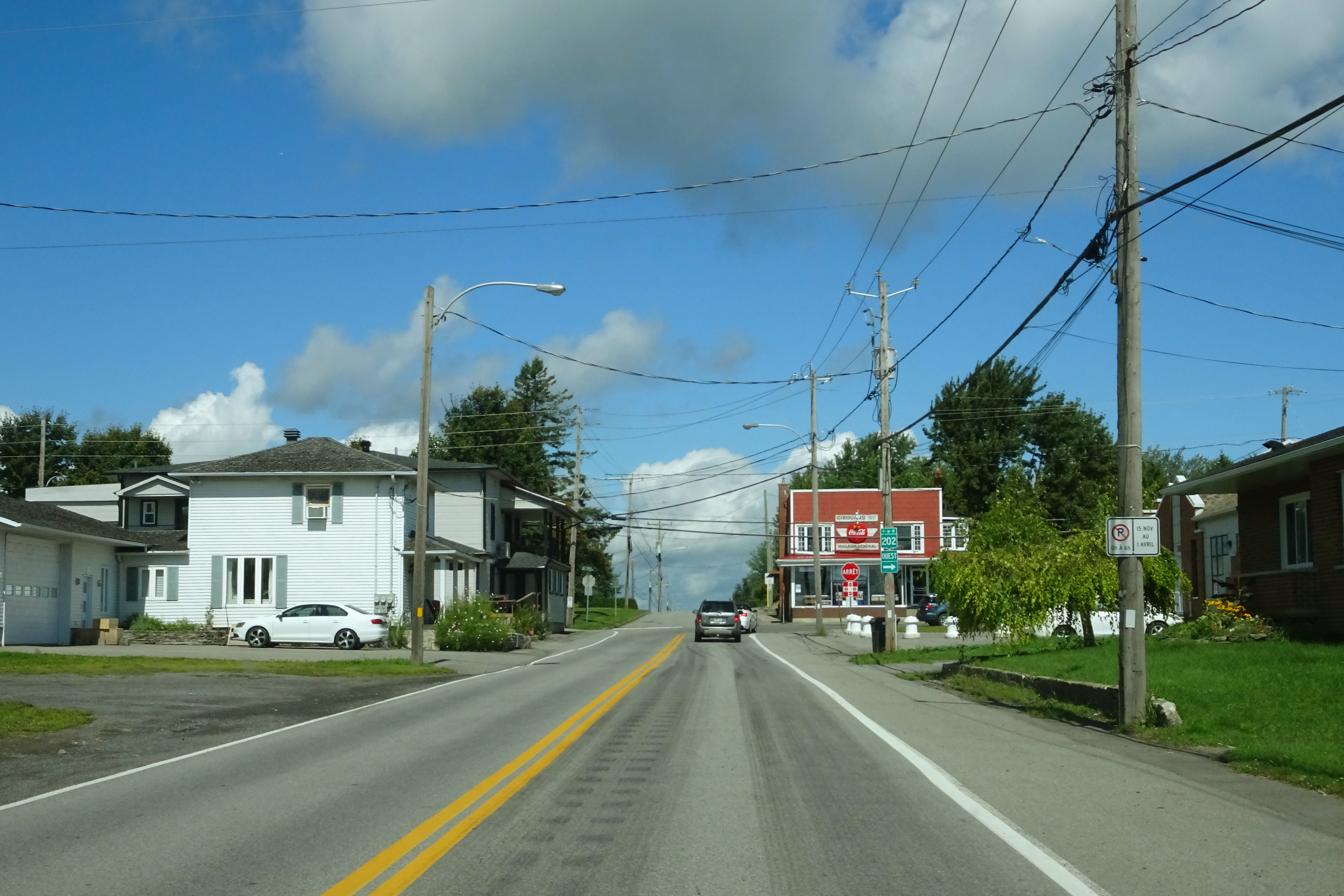

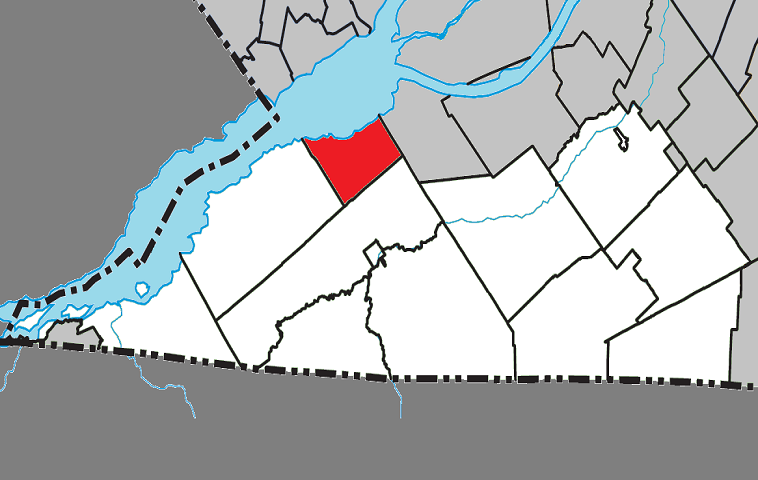
- Location within Le Haut-Saint-Laurent RCM

- Location in southern Quebec
- Coordinates: 45°10′N 74°12′W
- Country: Canada
- Province: Quebec
- Region: Montérégie
- RCM: Le Haut-Saint-Laurent
- Constituted: June 12, 1882

Government
  - Mayor: Louise Lebrun
  - Federal riding: Beauharnois—Salaberry
  - Prov. riding: Huntingdon

Area
  - Total: 67.50 km^{2} (26.06 sq mi)
  - Land: 40.14 km^{2} (15.50 sq mi)

Population (2021)
  - Total: 1,609
  - Density: 40.1/km^{2} (104/sq mi)
  - Pop 2016-2021: ▲21.5%
  - Dwellings: 895
- Time zone: UTC−5 (EST)
  - Summer (DST): UTC−4 (EDT)
- Postal code(s): J0S 1P0
- Area codes: 450 and 579
- Highways: R-132 R-202
- Website: www.ste-barbe.com

Sainte-Barbe (French pronunciation: [sɛ̃t baʁb]) is a municipality of Quebec, located within Le Haut-Saint-Laurent Regional County Municipality in the Montérégie administrative region. The population as of the Canada 2021 Census was 1,609.

== History ==
Sainte-Barbe was created on January 1, 1883, by splitting away from Saint-Anicet. The name honors Saint Barbara and pays homage to Marie-Barbe de Boullongne (1618-1685), wife of Louis d'Ailleboust de Coulonge, governor of New France. On April 4, 2009, Sainte-Barbe changed its status from parish municipality to municipality.

== Geography ==
=== Communities ===
The following locations reside within the municipality's boundaries:

- Pointe-Biron (45°10′33″N 74°14′43″W) – a residential area on the south shore of the Saint Lawrence River along Route 132.
- Pointe-Lalonde (45°10′33″N 74°13′57″W) – a residential area on the south shore of the Saint Lawrence River along Route 132.

=== Lakes & Rivers ===
The following waterways pass through or are situated within the municipality's boundaries:

- Saint Lawrence River – situated at municipality's northern boundary.

== Demographics ==
=== Population ===
Canada census – Sainte-Barbe community profile

	2021	2016	2011
Population	1,609 (+21.5% from 2016)	1,324 (-5.6% from 2011)	1,403 (-3.4% from 2006)
Land area	40.14 km^{2} (15.50 sq mi)	40.16 km^{2} (15.51 sq mi)	40.24 km^{2} (15.54 sq mi)
Population density	40.1/km^{2} (104/sq mi)	33.0/km^{2} (85/sq mi)	34.9/km^{2} (90/sq mi)
Median age	51.2 (M: 50.4, F: 52.4)	51.5 (M: 51.6, F: 51.3)	47.1 (M: 47.3, F: 46.8)
Private dwellings	895 (total)	787 (total)	790 (total)
Median household income	$78,500	$65,792	$48,371

References: 2021 2016 2011

Historical Census Data - Sainte-Barbe, Quebec
Year	Pop.	±%
1891	582	—
1901	533	−8.4%
1911	527	−1.1%
1921	596	+13.1%
1931	555	−6.9%
1941	570	+2.7%
1951	554	−2.8%
1956	607	+9.6%
1961	660	+8.7%
1966	679	+2.9%
1971	791	+16.5%
1976	953	+20.5%
1981	1,091	+14.5%
1986	1,178	+8.0%
1991	1,307	+11.0%
1996	1,277	−2.3%
2001	1,338	+4.8%
2006	1,453	+8.6%
2011	1,403	−3.4%
2016	1,324	−5.6%
2021	1,609	+21.5%

=== Language ===
Canada Census Mother Tongue - Sainte-Barbe, Quebec
Census	Total	French			English			French & English			Other		
Year	Responses	Count	Trend	Pop %	Count	Trend	Pop %	Count	Trend	Pop %	Count	Trend	Pop %
2021	1,610	1,485	▲19.3%	92.2%	85	▲30.8%	5.3%	20	▲100.0%	1.2%	15	▲50.0%	0.9%
2016	1,325	1,245	▼6.0%	94.0%	65	▲8.3%	4.9%	10	▲100.0%	0.8%	10	▲100.0%	0.8%
2011	1,395	1,325	▼0.7%	95.0%	60	▼36.8%	4.3%	5	▲ n/a%	0.4%	5	▼66.7%	0.4%
2006	1,445	1,335	▲9.0%	92.4%	95	▲46.2%	6.6%	0	▼100.0%	0.0%	15	0.0%	1.0%
2001	1,325	1,225	▲1.2%	92.5%	65	▲116.6%	4.9%	20	▼33.3%	42.9%	15	▲50.0%	50.0%
1996	1,275	1,210	n/a	98.8%	30	n/a	0.7%	35	n/a	0.3%	10	n/a	0.2%

== Attractions ==
Among Sainte-Barbe's attractions are its waterfront area on Chemin du Bord-de-l'Eau and Route 132, small private islands such as Île Raymond, Port Lewis Marina, and boat launch ramps. The municipality also has a wide variety of heritage buildings dating from the 19th century and before 1940, including residences, commercial buildings, and barns.

The municipality has hosted the world's smallest animation festival since 2017. This festival takes place in January and is open to the public.

== See also ==
- Le Haut-Saint-Laurent Regional County Municipality
- La Guerre River
- Saint-Louis River (Beauharnois)
- List of municipalities in Quebec
