= La Guerre River =

Location
- Country: Canada
- Province: Quebec
- Region: Montérégie
- MRC: Le Haut-Saint-Laurent Regional County Municipality

Physical characteristics
- Source: Marshes and agricultural streams
  - location: Sainte-Barbe
  - coordinates: 45.138095°N 74.219476°W
  - elevation: 48
- Mouth: Lake Saint-Louis
  - location: Saint-Anicet
  - coordinates: 45.31528°N 73.88028°W
  - elevation: 26 m (85 ft)
- Length: 8.0 km (5.0 mi)

Basin features
- Tributaries
  - left: (upstream) Quenneville stream, Brûlé fork stream, West branch, Foran stream, Casey stream.

The La Guerre River is a tributary of the south shore of lake Saint-François which is crossed to the east by the St. Lawrence River. This river flows through the municipalities of Sainte-Barbe (MRC Beauharnois-Salaberry) and Saint-Anicet, in the Le Haut-Saint-Laurent Regional County Municipality, in the administrative region of Montérégie, in Quebec, in Canada.

== Geography ==
The neighboring geographic slopes of the Saint-Louis River are:

- north side: lake Saint-François, St. Lawrence River;
- east side: Doyon stream, Saint-Louis River (Beauharnois);
- south side: Chateauguay River, Rivière aux Outardes;
- west side: Quenneville stream, Saint-François lake, St. Lawrence River.

The head of the La Guerre River (flowing to the southwest) is connected to the head of the Saint-Louis River (Beauharnois) which flows rather towards the northeast, crossing Saint-Stanislas-de-Kostka, Saint-Louis-de-Gonzague, Saint-Étienne-de-Beauharnois and Beauharnois where it flows into the St. Lawrence River. These two rivers take their common source from a marsh area located south of the village of Sainte-Barbe. Donohoe Creek drains the eastern zone of the marsh and Cowan Creek drains the southern zone.

The La Guerre River flows in agricultural zones first towards the southwest, towards the west bypassing an area of marsh, then towards the northwest until its mouth. Its most important tributary is the western branch.

After crossing route 132, the La Guerre River flows into Saint-Anicet Bay, at Saint-Anicet, on the south shore of Lake Saint-François, east of the village of Saint-Anicet. This bay is located between Pointe Castagnier (to the east) and Pointe Dupuis (to the west). The mouth of the river is located opposite Pointe Mouillée and the mouth of "Sutherland Creek" in Ontario.

== Toponymy ==
The name of this river has appeared on geographical maps since at least the 1950s. It evokes the life work of "François Benoît dit Laguerre" who, at the turn of the XIXth, was building along its course.

The toponym "Rivière La Guerre" was formalized on January 5, 1984, at the Commission de toponymie du Québec.

== See also ==
- Rivière-La Guerre, an old village
- Sainte-Barbe, a municipality
- Saint-Anicet, a municipality
- Le Haut-Saint-Laurent Regional County Municipality
- Chateauguay River, a stream
- List of rivers of Quebec
