= Saint-Louis River (Beauharnois) =

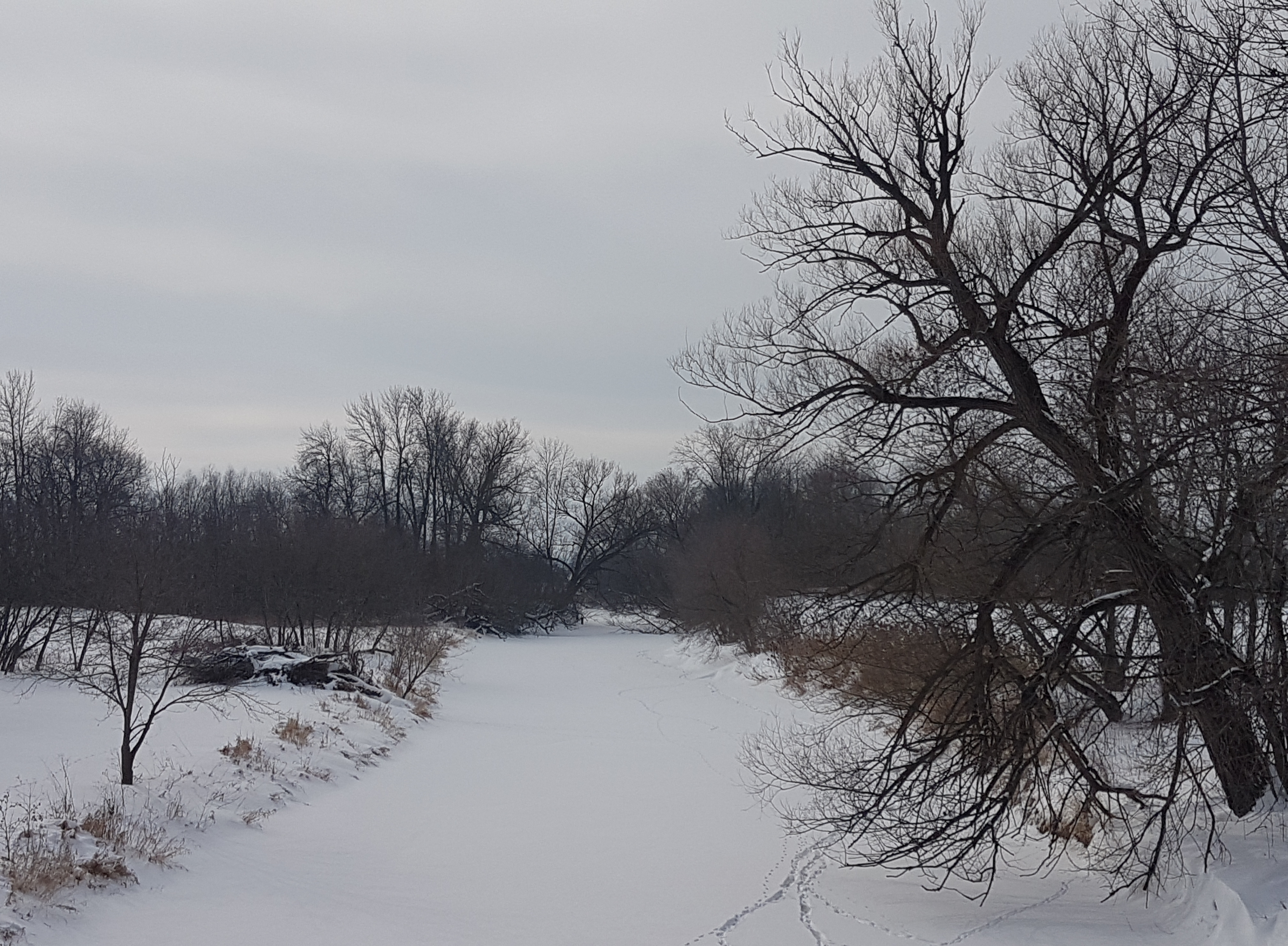

Location
- Country: Canada
- Province: Quebec
- Region: Montérégie
- MRC: Beauharnois-Salaberry

Physical characteristics
- Source: Marshes and agricultural streams
  - location: Sainte-Barbe
  - coordinates: 45.138095°N 74.219476°W
  - elevation: 48
- Mouth: Lake Saint-Louis
  - location: Beauharnois
  - coordinates: 45.31528°N 73.88028°W
  - elevation: 26 m (85 ft)
- Length: 30.3 km (18.8 mi)

Basin features
- Tributaries
  - left: (from the mouth) discharge Saint-Louis
  - right: (from the mouth) Vinet stream, Jos.-Montpelier stream, Saint-Édouard stream, Georges-Vinet stream, Himbault stream, E.-Caron stream, Lafontaine stream, Legault-Daigneault descent, Longtin stream, Brisson stream, Bell stream, Saint outlet -Louis, Donohoe Creek.

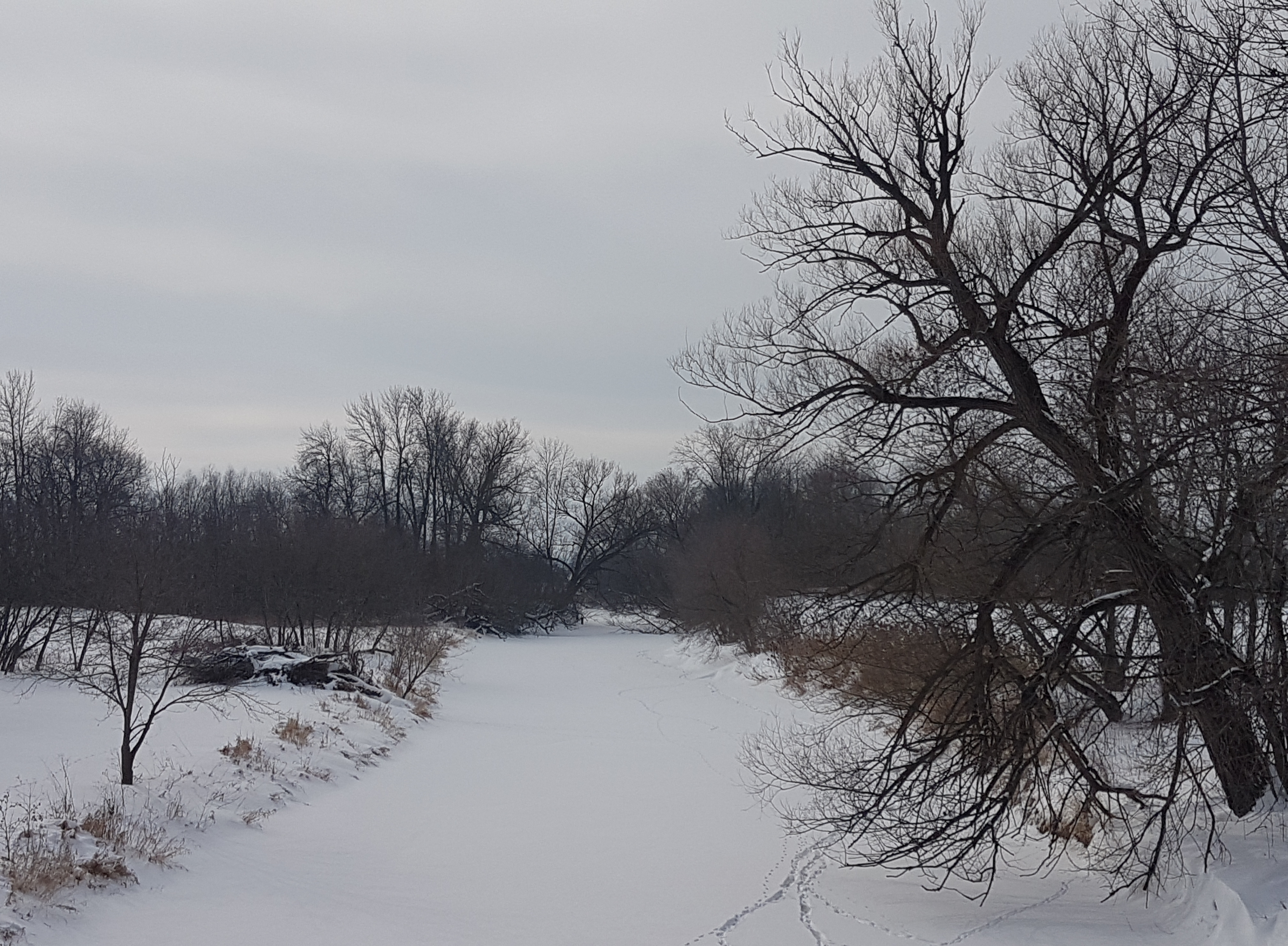
Winter view of the Saint-Louis River from the Montée Boyer bridge in Saint-Louis-de-Gonzague (Montérégie, Quebec), February 2022.

The Saint-Louis river (French: rivière Saint-Louis, pronounced [ʁivjɛʁ sɛ̃ lwi]) is a tributary of the south shore of the Saint Lawrence River. This river flows through the municipalities of Sainte-Barbe, Saint-Stanislas-de-Kostka, Saint-Louis-de-Gonzague, Saint-Étienne-de-Beauharnois and Beauharnois, in the Beauharnois-Salaberry Regional County Municipality, in the administrative region of Montérégie, in the Southwest of province of Quebec, in Canada.

== Geography ==
The neighboring geographic slopes of the Saint-Louis river are:

- north side: St. Lawrence Seaway, St. Lawrence River;
- east side: Chateauguay River;
- south side: Chateauguay River, rivière aux Outardes;
- west side: La Guerre River, Lake Saint Francis, Saint Lawrence River.

The head of the river (flowing northeast) is connected to the head of the rivière La Guerre which flows west, where it flows on the south shore of Lake Saint Francis, east of the village of Saint-Anicet. Both rivers take their common source from a marsh area located south of the village of Sainte-Barbe. Donohoe Creek drains the eastern zone of the marsh and Cowan Creek drains the southern zone.

From the head swamp, the Saint-Louis River flows 12.8 km northeast to route 201, more or less parallel to the south shore of lake Saint Francis. This segment of river first flows in a straight line due to the digging of the river, south of the village of Sainte-Barbe. The course of the river then passes on the north side of the village of Saint-Stanislas-de-Kostka.

In the next segment, the river flows 8.4 km east and runs parallel to the south bank of the Beauharnois Canal, bordering on the south side a wetland located between the canal and the river, up to the height of Saint-Louis-de-Gonzague.

From this village, the serpentine river flowing 10.0 km north-east, crossing Saint-Étienne-de-Beauharnois; then it flows for 9.1 km passing on the west side of the city of Beauharnois and on the east side of the Beauharnois Power Station to its mouth.

The Saint-Louis river flows on the south bank of the lake Saint-Louis which is crossed to the east by the Saint Lawrence River. The mouth of the Saint-Louis river is located 1.9 km (1.2 mi) downstream from the Beauharnois Powerhouse and upstream from the mouth of the Chateauguay River. Pointe Thibaudeau borders on the west side the small bay located at the mouth of the Saint-Louis river.

== Toponymy ==
The toponym "Rivière Saint-Louis" was formalized on December 5, 1968, at the Commission de toponymie du Québec.

== See also ==
- List of rivers of Quebec
