= Marie-Barbe de Boullongne =

New France philanthropist (c.1618–1685)

Marie-Barbe de Boullongne (ca 1618 – June 7, 1685) was a philanthropist in New France (later Quebec). She was a co-founder of a fraternity honouring the Holy Family, the Confrérie de la Sainte-Famille, and also the benefactor of the Hôtel-Dieu de Québec. She was also known as Barbe de Boulogne.

The daughter of Florentin de Boullongne and Eustache Quéan, she was born in Ravières, France. In 1638, she married Louis d'Ailleboust de Coulonge, who later became the governor of New France. She apparently took an interest in the First Nations people, learning their languages, and was given by them the Algonquin name Chaouerindamaguetch ("She who takes pity on us in our wretchedness"). After her husband's death in 1660, she became a novice in the Ursulines of Quebec. However, unable to adjust to their rules, she left after several months with the aim of doing good works. In the years 1662 to 1663, with Father Pierre-Joseph-Marie Chaumonot, she founded the Confrérie de la Sainte-Famille at Montreal; it was later established at Quebec City with the support of Bishop François de Laval. In 1670, she donated her worldly possessions to the support of the Hôtel-Dieu de Québec.

She died at Quebec City in 1685.

The Quebec municipality of Sainte-Barbe was named partly in honour of Barbe de Boullongne, as well as for Saint Barbara.
