= Maison Drouin =

18th century heritage house located in Sainte-Famille-de-l'Île-d'Orléans, Quebec

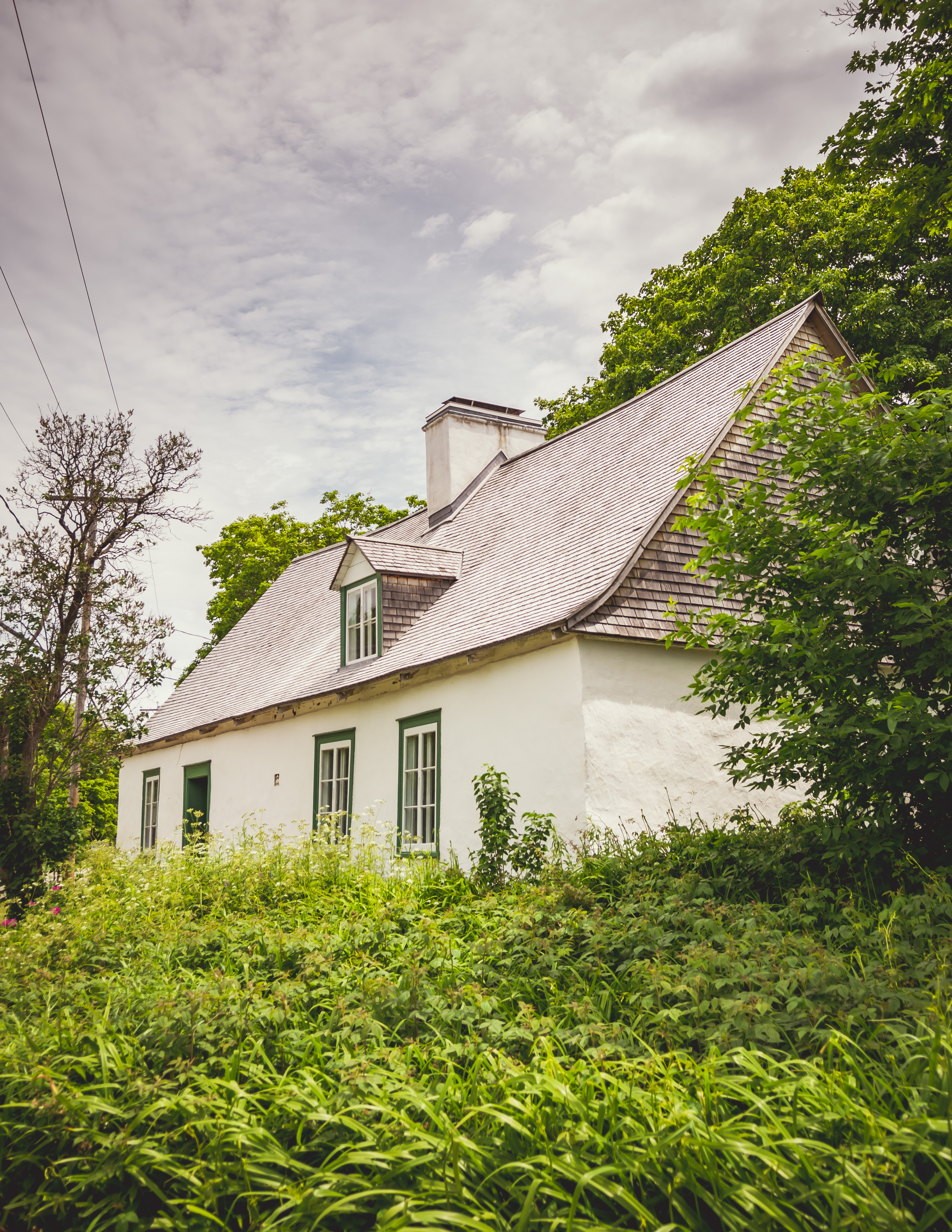
- Alternative names: Maison Cyril-Drouin

General information
- Architectural style: French colonial architecture
- Location: 2958 chemin Royal., Sainte-Famille-de-l'Île-d'Orléans, Quebec., Canada
- Coordinates: 47°00′07″N 70°54′00″W
- Construction started: By 1729, with an extension circa 1734
- Owner: Fondation François-Lamy

Design and construction
- Awards: Classified heritage building (2010); Part of a Québec heritage property (1970)
- Designations: House
- Known for: Being part an Île-d'Orléans heritage site

Website
- http://www.fondationfrancoislamy.org/fr/maison-drouin/

Maison Drouin (French pronunciation: [mɛzɔ̃ dʁuɛ̃]; also known as Maison Cyril-Drouin) is a farmhouse located in a rural setting in Sainte-Famille-de-l'Île-d'Orléans, Quebec, Canada. It was built between 1729 and 1730, then extended between 1734 and 1736. One of the oldest houses on Île d'Orléans, it has retained many of its original features over time, having undergone only minor changes since its extension. It bears witness to the pre–Industrial Revolution Quebec lifestyle.

It was built by the Canac dit Marquis family, who kept it until 1872 when it passed into the hands of the Drouin family. In 1996, it was purchased by the Fondation François-Lamy, an organization dedicated to preserving the heritage of Île d'Orléans. It has since been converted into a historical interpretation center for Île d'Orléans and opened to the public. It was classified as a heritage building by the Minister of Culture and Communications in 2010, and is part of the Île-d'Orléans heritage site.

== Location ==
The Drouin house is located at 2958 Chemin Royal in Sainte-Famille-de-l'Île-d'Orléans, in a rural area near the border with Saint-François-de-l'Île-d'Orléans.

The house is located on a relatively flat parcel with mature trees. It overlooks the St. Lawrence River and Sainte-Anne-de-Beaupré, which is on the other side of the channel. It is part of the Île-d'Orléans heritage site, declared by the Government of Quebec in 1970.

== History ==
=== Baucher dit Morency family (1666–1727) ===
René Baucher dit Morency was the first to acquire the land on which Maison Drouin is located. He was born around 1646 in the parish of Saint-Martin de Montmorency parish in France. He was the brother of Guillaume Baucher dit Morency, who settled in Sainte-Famille-de-l'Île-d'Orléans in 1656 and is the ancestor of the Morency families of Quebec.

However, René's presumed arrival in New France came later. Indeed, there is no mention of him in America before January 8, 1666, the date of his marriage to his first wife Adrienne Grandjean. A month after his union, on February 10, 1666, René Baucher signed a deed with Marie-Barbe de Boullongne, widow of Louis d'Ailleboust, seigneur of Argentenay, granting him three arpents of land facing the St. Lawrence River and extending to the center of the island. This is the land where Maison Drouin stands today. Madame de Boulongne's misunderstanding of the exact boundaries of her fief, which corresponds roughly to the northern part of today's municipality of Saint-François, led her to grant René Baucher land in Sainte-Famille.

At the time, censitaires were obliged to keep warmth and possession of the land granted to them. However, there is every reason to believe that René Baucher never honored this pledge. On October 5, 1678, a contract was signed between Baucher and Nicolas Menanteau to clear and seed an acre of his land for the price of 30 livres. Baucher moved around a lot. As a merchant, he traveled the length and breadth of the region, eventually settling in Newfoundland, where his trail is lost. On his death, his land passed to his son Jacques and his widow Marie-Madeleine Trumel. They ceded their respective shares to Trumel's new husband, Michel Balan dit Lacombe. He owned the land until July 31, 1727, when he sold it to Marc-Antoine Canac dit Marquis, a militia major based in Sainte-Famille.

=== Canac dit Marquis family (1727–1872) ===
Marc-Antoine Canac dit Marquis acquired the land to settle his son François. It was probably François who, shortly after 1729, erected the first section of the Drouin house, on the eastern side. In fact, according to the dendrochronological studies of the house's wood, it was cut in the winter of 1729. Following an exchange contract between François Canac and his brother Jean-Baptiste, the latter became owner of the land and building in 1734. He moved in with his wife Marguerite Drouin and extended the house to the west, probably the same year. His family and descendants occupied the land until 1861. In total, four generations of Canac passed down the House. When Jean-Baptiste died, the estate went to his son, also named Jean-Baptiste, who moved in with his wife Judith Pépin dit Lachance. Thereafter, their son Jean took over. He lived in the house with his wife Marie Lepage. Finally, Jean-Marie Canac, Jean's son, took possession of the house. He moved in in 1823 with his wife Marie-Thérèse Deblois; he was the last of his line to occupy the land.

Following a lawsuit initiated by a niece and two nephews under his guardianship, Jean-Marie Canac dit Marquis was forced to leave the land and house. They convinced Judge Andrew Stuart that their uncle had exploited a garden in their inheritance without authorization. As compensation, they were granted two hundred piastres. Ruined, Jean-Marie sold the house to his brother François Canac-Marquis. A year after the death of his previous wife, the sixty-year-old decided to start a new household: he married 33-year-old Marie-Luce Foucher. They had five children, the very last of the Canacs to be born in the house. François Canac remained owner of the house until it was sold to Élie Drouin in 1872.

=== Drouin family (1872–1996) ===
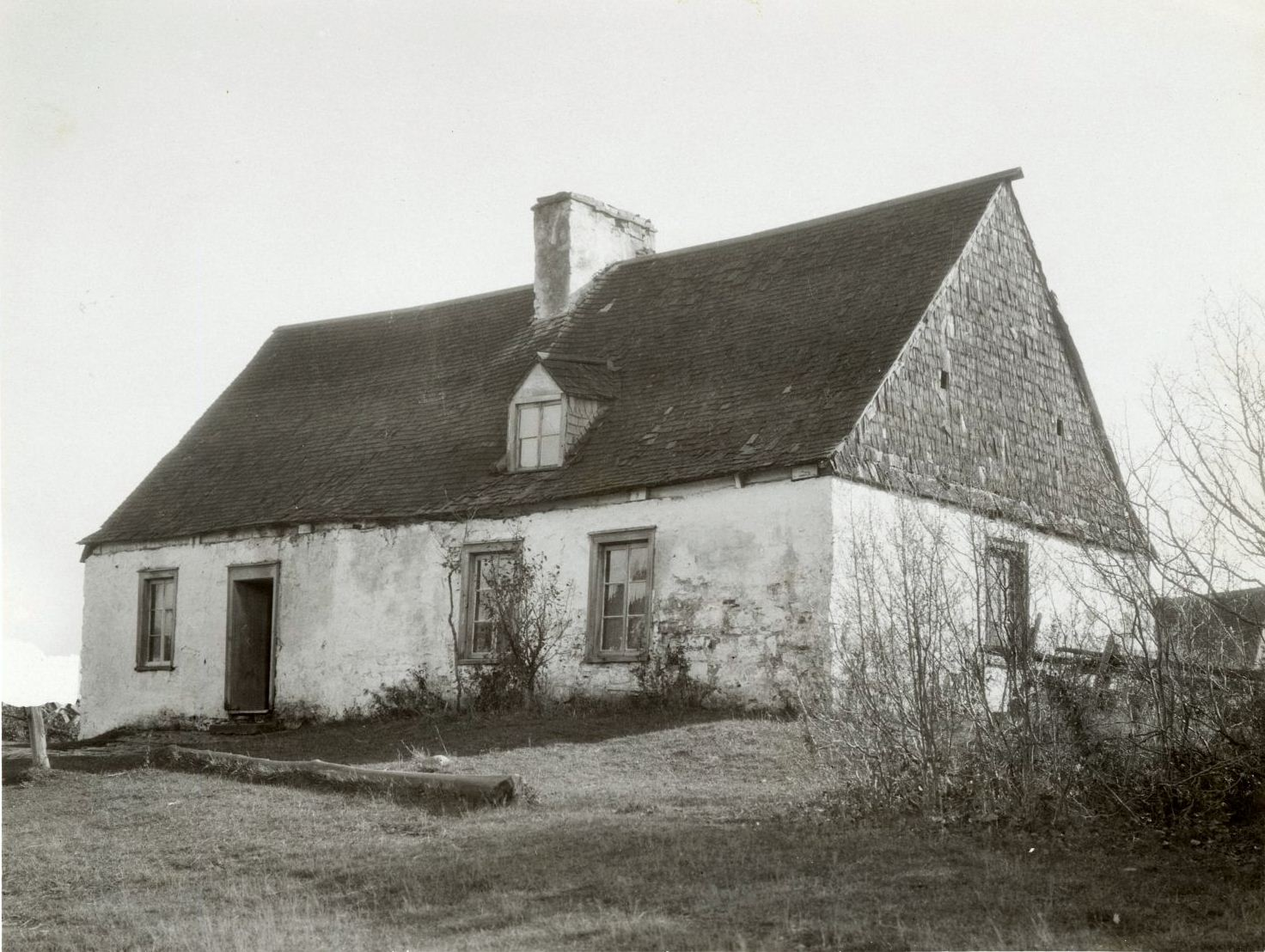
Maison Drouin circa 1925.

Élie Drouin, a blacksmith, acquired the building at the age of 43. The first Drouin to own the house was very close to the Canac family. Indeed, two of his brothers had married daughters of Jean-Marie, and his own wife, Marie Deblois, was the couple's niece. He acquired the house and lived there until his death in 1902. The Drouins' future on the land is assured by Élie's son Cyrille, who buys his father's house to help him out of a financial predicament. Cyrille Drouin married Eulalie Asselin in 1902, and the couple gave birth to the last Drouin children born on the land: Cyrille (son), Maria, and Élie.

On the death of Cyrille (father), the land was given to his son Élie who, the year of his marriage, decided to transfer it to his sister Maria and leave for Montreal with his wife Jeannine Létourneau. Maria remained in the family home with her brother Cyrille. Electricity was installed around 1946 to power a few sockets and light bulbs. Both remained single and took care of the house, Maria until her death in 1977 and Cyrille until his departure for a retirement home in 1984. In 1990, Cyrille died, as did his brother Élie. The estate passed to Jeannine Létourneau and her daughters Sylvie and Linda. The shingle roof was replaced in 1990 by a tin roof to correct a water leakage problem.

=== Fondation François-Lamy (Since 1996) ===
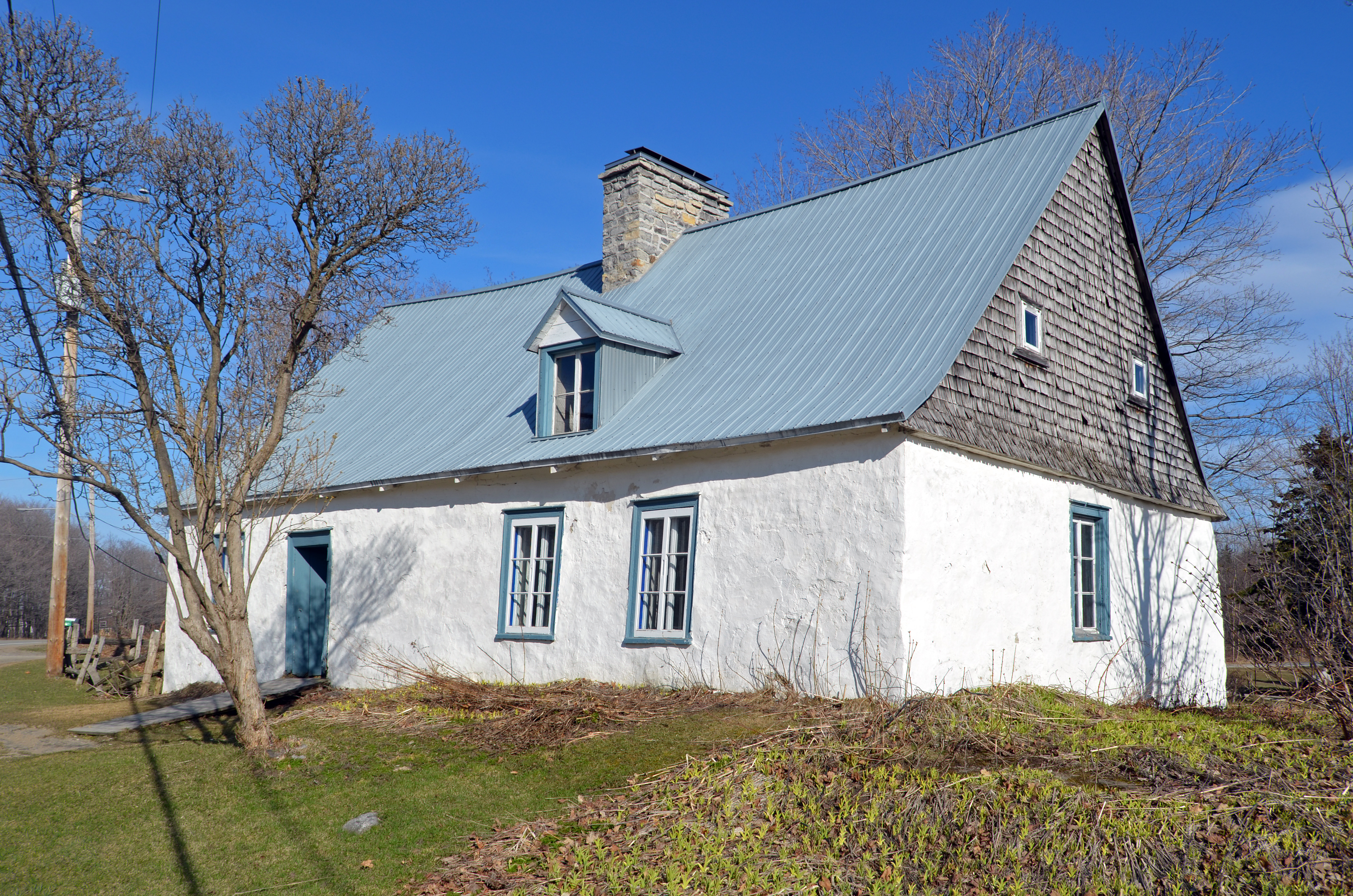
Maison Drouin before its 2010 restoration.

The François-Lamy Foundation is a non-profit organization based in Sainte-Famille-de-l'Île-d'Orléans. Created in 1978 by Georges-Henri Blouin, Pascal Poulin and parish priest Bertrand Fournier, its mission is to preserve and promote the island's heritage. When several historians and heritage enthusiasts alerted the fact that the Maison Drouin was up for sale, the Foundation decided to apply to the Quebec Ministry of Culture and Communications for assistance in acquiring it. The deal was formalized in 1996, and the house was opened to visitors the following year. In 2001, the Foundation restored the southeast wall and rebuilt the bread oven vault. A forge and latrines were added behind the house in 2003.

On February 11, 2010, the building was granted heritage classification by the Minister of Culture and Communications. In 2010, a vast restoration project was undertaken. Rather than favoring a stylistic approach that would have frozen the house in a specific era, those in charge decided to preserve various traces of the building's evolution. The restoration contract was awarded to Isabelle Paradis and Gina Garcia of the Centre de Conservation du Québec, in collaboration with Michel Boudreau, an architect specialized in heritage restoration. The project manager was architect Marie-Josée Deschênes. The original tin roofing was replaced by cedar shingles. Communities wanted the interior of the house to be preserved. So, instead of repainting, the decision was made to restore the interior finish and preserve the patina and wear of the finishes. It was also decided to retain the large-paned casement windows of the early 20th century, rather than revert to the small panes used in the 18th century.

== Architecture ==
Maison Drouin, one of the oldest surviving buildings on Île d'Orléans, is a prime example of French colonial architecture. This architecture, often referred to as "French spirit", should, according to experts such as Gérard Morisset, rather be described as "northern European Romanesque". It is a good example of the rural lifestyle in Quebec before the industrial revolution.

The house is rectangular in plan, with a low ground clearance. The walls are made of rendered stone. The gable roof is covered with wood shingles. It is topped by a stone chimney and features a gabled dormer. The central placement of the chimney, common in the Quebec City region, indicates a longitudinal expansion of the house. Windows and doors, though not numerous, are arranged asymmetrically. Casement windows are composed of medium and large panes.

The first floor is divided by a stone wall that defines two living areas. The rest of the rooms are separated either by wide, tongue-and-groove plank walls or by plastered lath partitions. The oldest room features a fireplace and a bread oven, whose heat pipe communicates with the chimney. The floors are covered with wide planks. A trapdoor in the floor gives access to the cellar, and a miller staircase leads to the attic. A closed room with a small window on the south façade indicates the presence of an indoor dairy. Dendrochronological analyses prove that the floor timbers were cut in the winter of 1729.

The exposed ceiling beams are roughly hewed on the east side, while on the west side, they are quarter-rounded. The living room and kitchen are located in the eastern part of the house. These rooms, featuring niches with statuettes, are decorated with greater care than the others. The bedrooms are on the west side of the house. As for the attic, it was used as a children's bedroom on the west side, and for storage purposes on the east side. Unfortunately, the attic bedroom was locked during the winter, as it was not insulated. The house has only a rudimentary electrical system, consisting of lighting and a few electrical outlets. There are no sanitary facilities. The interior, which has undergone few modifications since the house was built and enlarged, has retained a high degree of integrity.

== Tourism ==
Maison Drouin is open to the public from mid-June to mid-October. The François-Lamy Foundation organizes guided tours; it is also possible to take a tour assisted by a tablet that describes the house and its various occupants through 27 video vignettes.

== Appendix ==
=== Related articles ===
- fr:Liste du patrimoine immobilier de la Capitale-Nationale

=== External links ===
- Geography resource: Banque de noms de lieux du Québec archive (in French only)
- Resource on architecture: Répertoire du patrimoine culturel du Québec archive
- Official website archive

=== Bibliography ===
- Jean Rompré and Henri-Paul Thibault, La maison Drouin de Sainte-Famille de l'île d'Orléans : Son histoire, la terre et ses occupants, 2006, 369 p.
- Marie-Josée Deschênes, "Maison Drouin : renaissance d'une pionnière", Continuité, no 142, 2014, p. 8–9 (ISSN 1923–2543, read online archive).
- Frédérik Guérin, Une relecture de la charpente dans l'architecture résidentielle au Québec, 1650–1850, 2018.

=== Filmography ===
- Feu et lieu: La restauration de la Maison Drouin, Francis Lauzon, Solstice/Audiovisual, 2014, 29 min
