= Sainte-Famille-de-l'Île-d'Orléans =

- Municipality
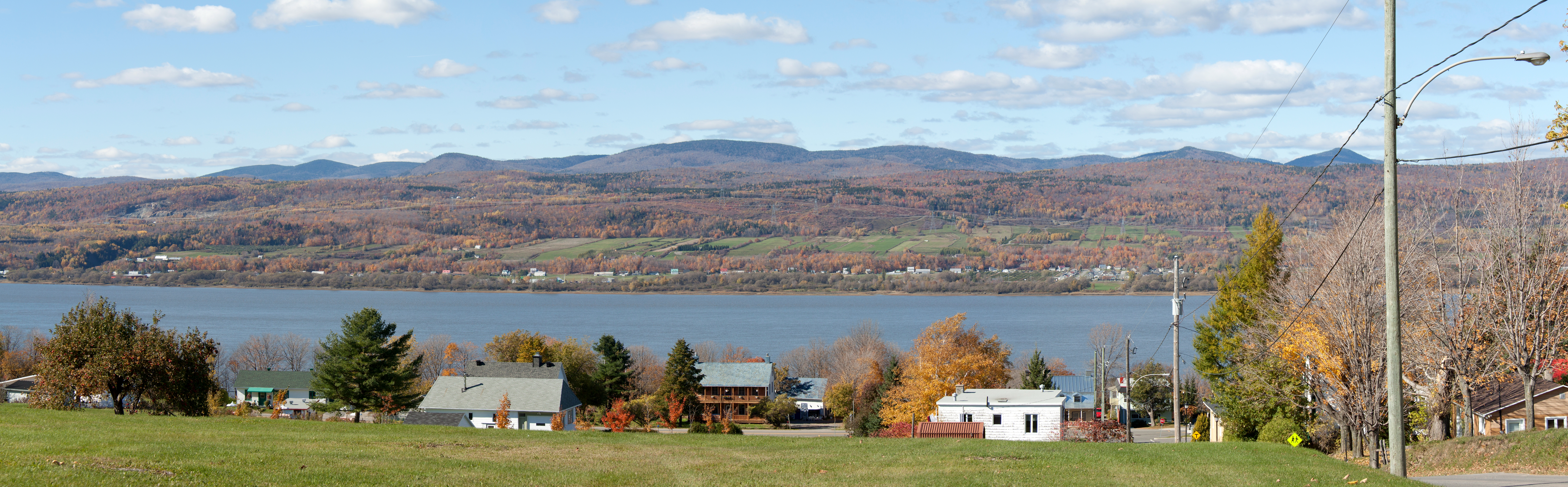

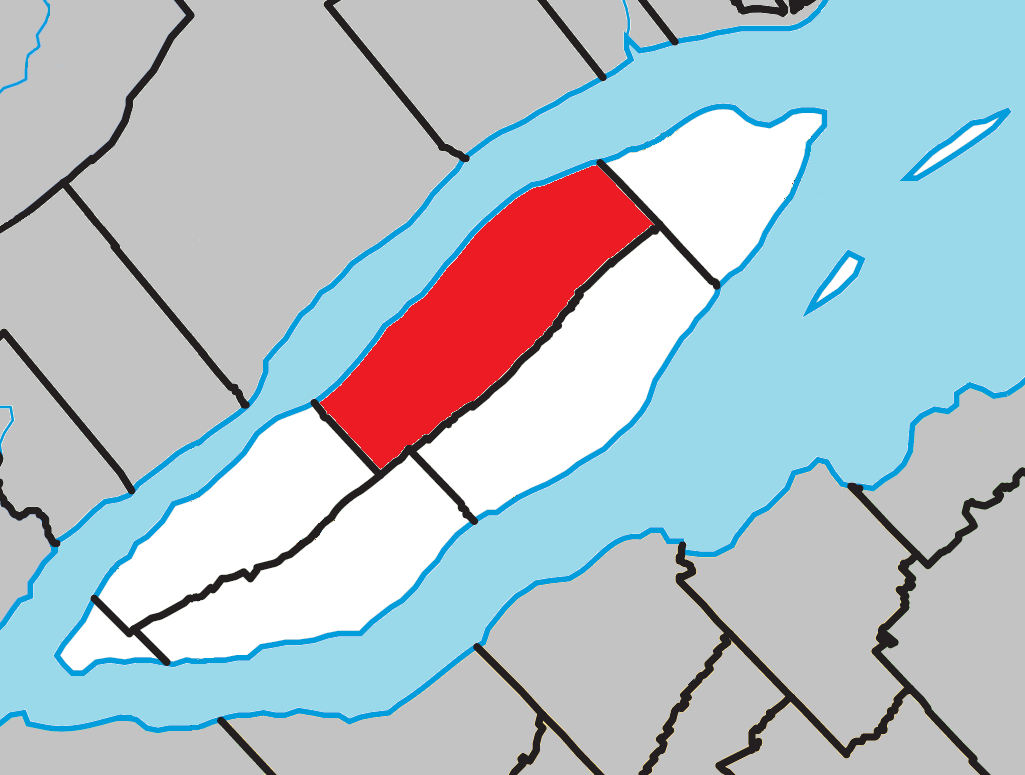
- Location within L'Île-d'Orléans RCM

- Location in central Quebec
- Coordinates: 46°58′N 70°58′W
- Country: Canada
- Province: Quebec
- Region: Capitale-Nationale
- RCM: L'Île-d'Orléans
- Settled: 1660
- Constituted: July 1, 1855

Government
  - Mayor: Jean Pierre Turcotte
  - Federal riding: Montmorency—Charlevoix
  - Prov. riding: Charlevoix–Côte-de-Beaupré

Area
  - Total: 50.70 km^{2} (19.58 sq mi)
  - Land: 50.54 km^{2} (19.51 sq mi)

Population (2021)
  - Total: 850
  - Density: 16.8/km^{2} (44/sq mi)
  - Pop 2016-2021: ▼9.4%
  - Dwellings: 371
- Time zone: UTC−5 (EST)
  - Summer (DST): UTC−4 (EDT)
- Postal code(s): G0A 3P0
- Area codes: 418 and 581
- Highways: R-368
- Website: www.ste-famille.iledorleans.com

Sainte-Famille-de-l'Île-d'Orléans (French pronunciation: [sɛ̃ famij də lil dɔʁleɑ̃], lit. 'Saint-Famille of the Orléans Island'; Sainte-Famille prior to September 12, 2017) is a municipality in the L'Île-d'Orléans Regional County Municipality, Quebec, Canada, part of the administrative region of Capitale-Nationale. It is situated along the western shores of Island of Orléans.

Founded in 1661, Sainte-Famille-de-l'Île-d'Orléans is the oldest settlement on l'île d'Orléans and has one of the most important concentrations of houses of the old French regime.

== History ==
In 1661, l'Île d'Orléans' first parish was formed and it was known until 1679 as Paroisse de l'Île. The parish municipality was first established in 1845 as La Sainte-Famille, abolished in 1847, and reestablished in 1855. The article 'La' disappeared in the 19th century. A post office named Sainte-Famille-d'Orléans was opened in 1852.

On September 12, 2017, the Parish Municipality of Sainte-Famille changed statutes and name to the Municipality of Sainte-Famille-de-l'Île-d'Orléans.

== Demographics ==
=== Population ===
Canada census – Sainte-Famille-de-l'Île-d'Orléans community profile

	2021	2016	2011
Population	850 (-9.4% from 2016)	938 (10.2% from 2011)	851 (+0.8% from 2006)
Land area	50.54 km^{2} (19.51 sq mi)	48.76 km^{2} (18.83 sq mi)	48.46 km^{2} (18.71 sq mi)
Population density	16.8/km^{2} (44/sq mi)	19.2/km^{2} (50/sq mi)	17.6/km^{2} (46/sq mi)
Median age	54.8 (M: 56.4, F: 52.8)	53.5 (M: 53.4, F: 53.5)	50.0 (M: 49.8, F: 50.2)
Private dwellings	345 (total)	445 (total)	362 (total)
Median household income		$75,776	$61,927

References: 2021 2016 2011

Historical Census Data - Sainte-Famille-de-l'Île-d'Orléans

Year	Pop.	±%
1976	1,040	—
1981	1,027	−1.2%
1986	1,026	−0.1%
1991	942	−8.2%
1996	913	−3.1%

Year	Pop.	±%
2001	882	−3.4%
2006	844	−4.3%
2011	851	+0.8%
2016	938	+10.2%
2021	850	−9.4%

Source: Statistics Canada

=== Language ===
Canada Census Mother Tongue - Sainte-Famille-de-l'Île-d'Orléans, Quebec
Census	Total	French			English			French & English			Other		
Year	Responses	Count	Trend	Pop %	Count	Trend	Pop %	Count	Trend	Pop %	Count	Trend	Pop %
2016	930	915	▲15.1%	98.4%	10	0.0%	1.1%	0	0.0%	0.0%	5	▼50.0%	0.5%
2011	815	795	▼1.2%	97.6%	10	▲ n/a%	1.2%	0	0.0%	0.0%	10	▲ n/a%	1.2%
2006	805	805	▼6.9%	100.0%	0	▼100.0%	0.0%	0	0.0%	0.0%	0	0.0%	0.0%
2001	875	865	▼1.1%	98.9%	10	▲ n/a%	1.1%	0	0.0%	0.0%	0	0.0%	0.0%
1996	875	875	n/a	100.0%	0	n/a	0.0%	0	n/a	0.0%	0	n/a	0.0%

== Cultural significance ==
=== In literature ===
- In The Spy Who Loved Me, Ian Fleming's ninth novel in his James Bond series, the narrator Vivienne Michel was born and raised in Sainte-Famille.

== See also ==
- Chenal de l'Île d'Orléans
- Île d'Orléans
- Maison Drouin
