= Pointe-Lalonde =

Pointe Lalonde
- Interactive map of Pointe Lalonde
- Coordinates: 45°12′29″N 74°18′33″W
- Location: Rivière-Beaudette, Quebec, Canada

Pointe Lalonde is a geographical point (a cape) located in the municipality of Rivière-Beaudette, within the Vaudreuil-Soulanges regional county municipality in the Montérégie region of Quebec, Canada.

== Geography ==
The point projects into the local waterways near the border between Quebec and Ontario. It is situated at a latitude of 45°12'29" N and a longitude of 74°18'33" W.

== Toponymy ==
The specific name "Lalonde" is a prominent traditional surname in the Vaudreuil-Soulanges region. The designation was officially approved and registered by the Commission de toponymie du Québec on January 25, 1990.
