= Saint-Étienne-de-Beauharnois =

- Municipality
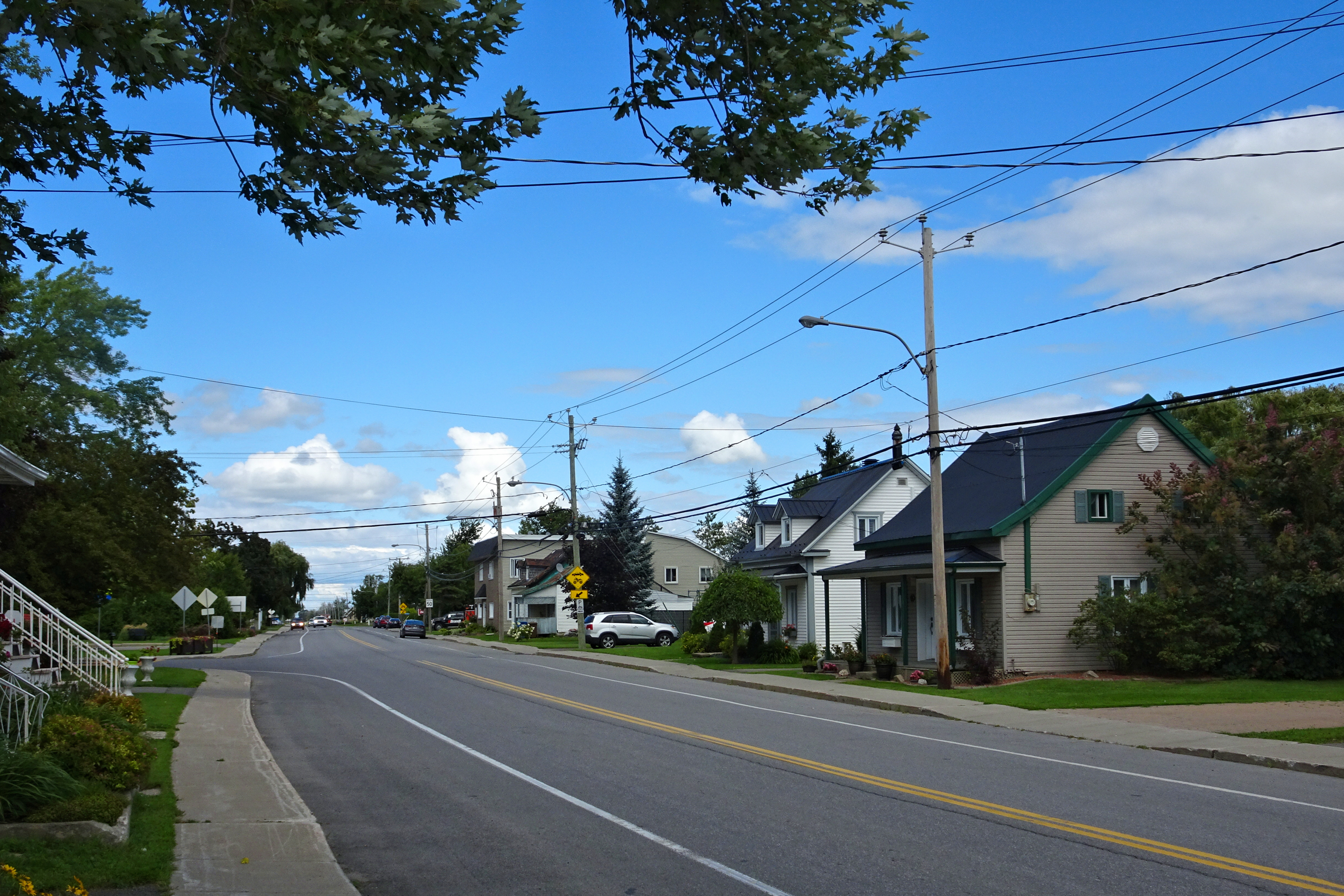

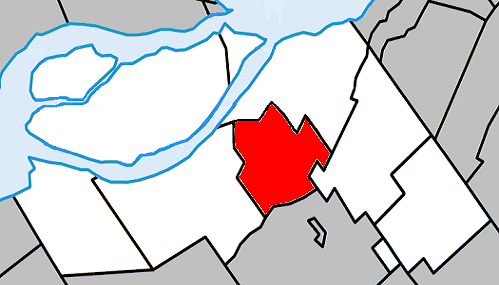
- Location within Beauharnois-Salaberry RCM

- Location in southern Quebec
- Coordinates: 45.25°N 73.92°W
- Country: Canada
- Province: Quebec
- Region: Montérégie
- RCM: Beauharnois-Salaberry
- Constituted: January 1, 1867

Government
  - Mayor: Martin Dumaresq
  - Federal riding: Salaberry—Suroît
  - Prov. riding: Beauharnois

Area
  - Total: 41.44 km^{2} (16.00 sq mi)
  - Land: 40.63 km^{2} (15.69 sq mi)

Population (2021)
  - Total: 1,099
  - Density: 27.1/km^{2} (70/sq mi)
  - Pop (2016-21): ▲32.3%
  - Dwellings: 431
- Time zone: UTC−5 (EST)
  - Summer (DST): UTC−4 (EDT)
- Postal code(s): J0S 1S0
- Area codes: 450 and 579
- Highways: R-236
- Website: www.st-etiennedebeauharnois.qc.ca

Saint-Étienne-de-Beauharnois (French pronunciation: [sɛ̃t‿etjɛn də boaʁnwa]) is a municipality of Quebec, Canada, located within the Beauharnois-Salaberry Regional County Municipality in the Montérégie administrative region. The population as of the Canada 2021 Census was 1,099.

The town is located on the banks of the Saint-Louis River.

== History ==
Settlement began in the early 19th century. In 1831, its first mill was built. In 1852, residents of the Saint-Clément and Saint-Louis parishes petitioned the Archbishop of Montreal for the creation of a new parish, which was granted after land was offered in the new settlement for a church. It construction began in 1863 and completed a year later.

Its post office opened in 1865, and two years later, on January 1, 1867, the municipality was established out of territory from Saint-Clément (since 1957 part of Beauharnois) and Saint-Louis-de-Gonzague. It was named after Saint Stephen and Beauharnois County in which it is located. On October 26, 1869, it changed statutes and became the Parish Municipality of Saint-Etienne. This reverted back to Municipality of Saint-Étienne-de-Beauharnois on March 15, 1969.

== Demographics ==
=== Population ===
Canada census – Saint-Étienne-de-Beauharnois community profile

	2021	2016	2011
Population	1,099 (+32.3% from 2016)	831 (+3.1% from 2011)	806 (+4.1% from 2006)
Land area	40.63 km^{2} (15.69 sq mi)	40.79 km^{2} (15.75 sq mi)	40.76 km^{2} (15.74 sq mi)
Population density	27.1/km^{2} (70/sq mi)	20.4/km^{2} (53/sq mi)	19.8/km^{2} (51/sq mi)
Median age	37.2 (M: 38.0, F: 36.0)	38.9 (M: 39.9, F: 38.0)	39.8 (M: 39.1, F: 41.3)
Private dwellings	431 (total)	346 (total)	319 (total)
Median household income	$104,000	$75,008	$73,540

References: 2021 2016 2011

Historical census data - Saint-Étienne-de-Beauharnois, Quebec

Year	Pop.	±%
1921	724	—
1931	656	−9.4%
1941	650	−0.9%
1951	670	+3.1%
1956	689	+2.8%
1961	805	+16.8%
1966	837	+4.0%

Year	Pop.	±%
1971	772	−7.8%
1976	811	+5.1%
1981	813	+0.2%
1986	771	−5.2%
1991	811	+5.2%
1991	811	+0.0%
1996	799	−1.5%

Year	Pop.	±%
2001	774	−3.1%
2006	774	+0.0%
2011	806	+4.1%
2016	831	+3.1%
2021	1,099	+32.3%

P
Source: Statistics Canada

=== Language ===
Canada Census mother tongue - Saint-Étienne-de-Beauharnois, Quebec
Census	Total	French			English			French & English			Other		
Year	Responses	Count	Trend	Pop %	Count	Trend	Pop %	Count	Trend	Pop %	Count	Trend	Pop %
2021	1,095	1,030	▲31.2%	94.1%	40	▲100.0%	3.7%	15	▲200.0%	1.4%	10	▼33.3%	0.9%
2016	830	785	▲1.9%	94.6%	20	0.0%	2.4%	5	0.0%	0.6%	15	▲50.0%	1.8%
2011	805	770	▲2.7%	95.7%	20	▲100.0%	2.5%	5	▲ n/a%	0.6%	10	0.0%	1.2%
2006	770	750	0.0%	97.4%	10	0.0%	1.3%	0	▼100.0%	0.0%	10	0.0%	1.3%
2001	780	750	▲3.4%	96.2%	10	▼75.0%	1.3%	10	0.0%	1.3%	10	▼50.0%	1.3%
1996	795	725	n/a	91.2%	40	n/a	5.0%	10	n/a	1.3%	20	n/a	2.5%

== Local government ==
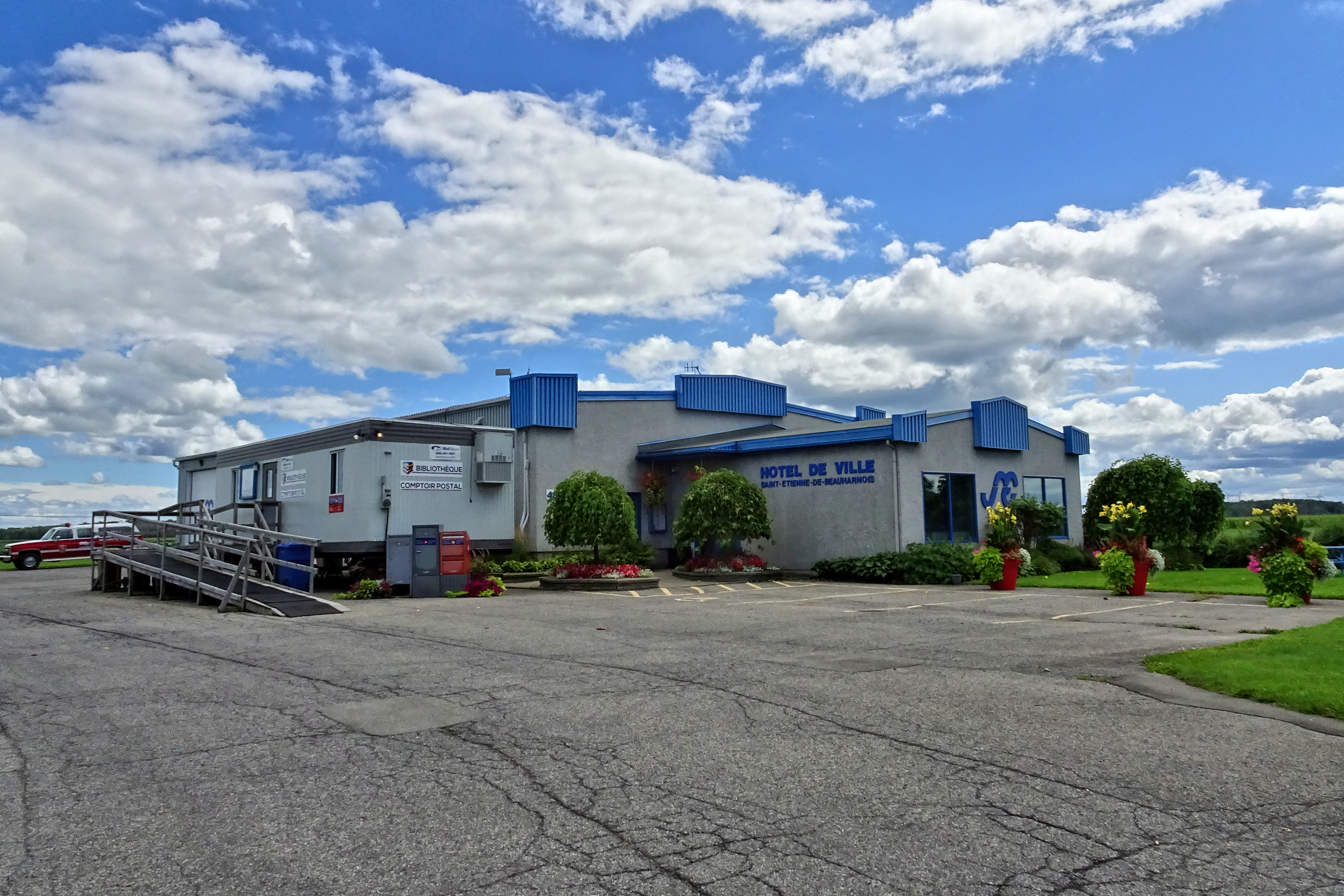
Municipal hall

List of former mayors:

- Gaétan Ménard (...–2009, 2013–2021)
- Louis Pouliot (2009–2013)
- Martin Dumaresq (2021–present)

== Education ==
Centre de services scolaire de la Vallée-des-Tisserands operates Francophone public schools:

- École Saint-Étienne

New Frontiers School Board operates Anglophone public schools:

- Howick Elementary School in Howick
- Chateauguay Valley Regional High School in Ormstown

== See also ==
- List of municipalities in Quebec
