= Saint-Anicet =

- Municipality
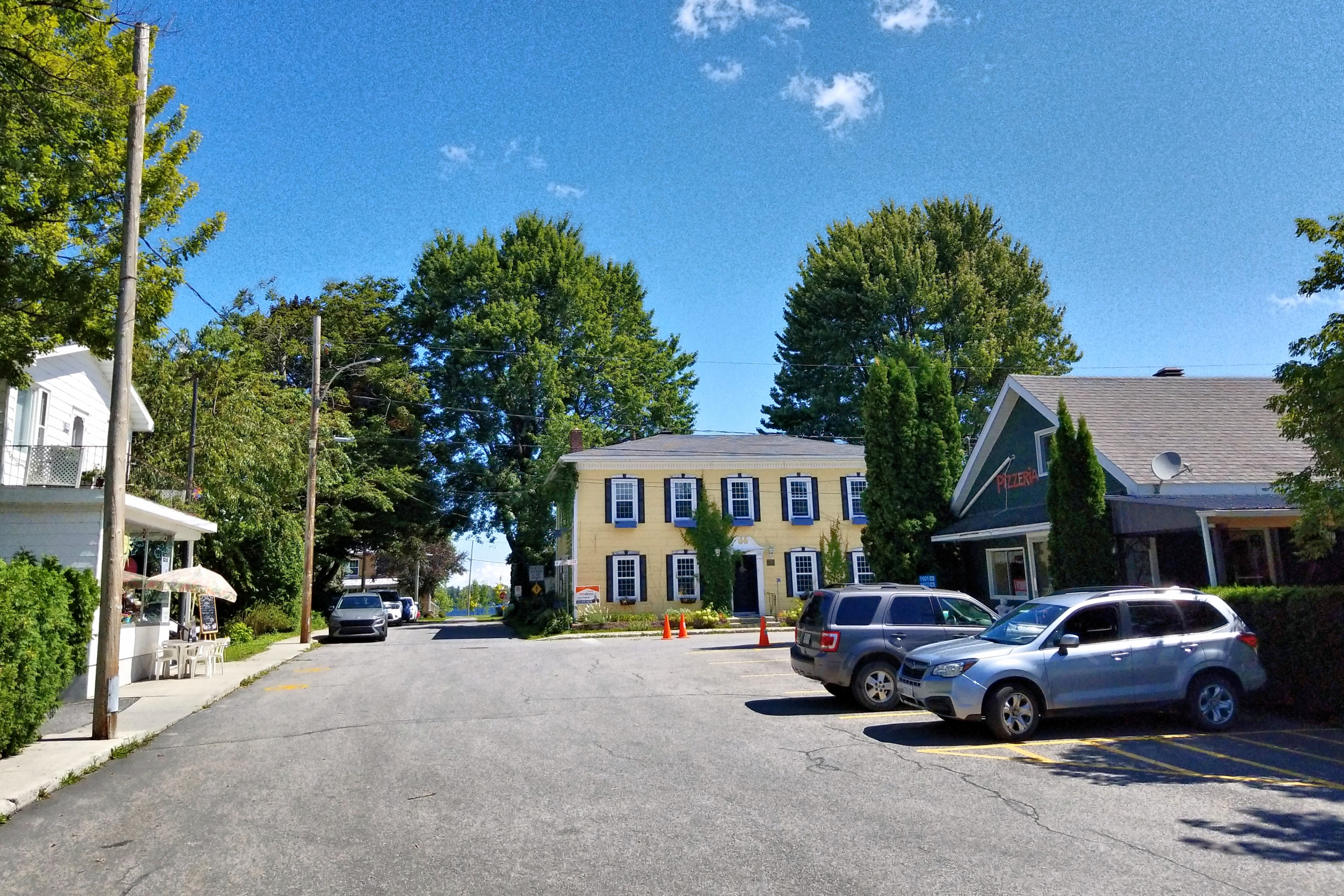
- Motto(s): Un lac, une campagne, une passion ("A lake, a countryside, a passion")
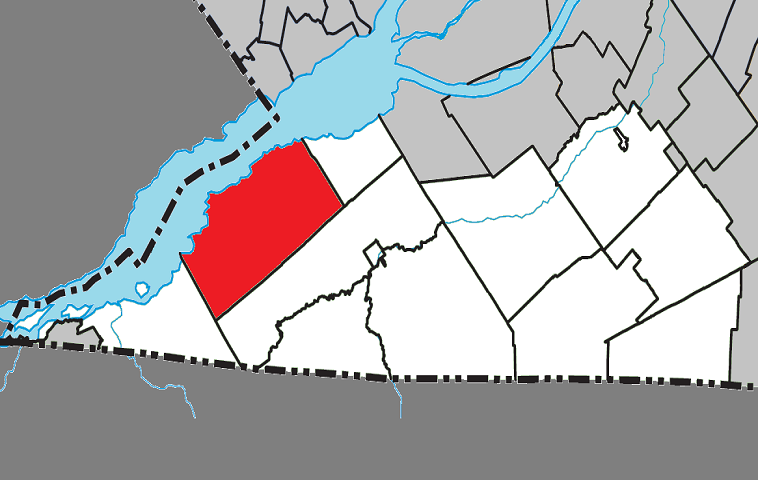
- Location within Le Haut-Saint-Laurent RCM

- Location in southern Quebec
- Coordinates: 45°07′N 74°21′W
- Country: Canada
- Province: Quebec
- Region: Montérégie
- RCM: Le Haut-Saint-Laurent
- Constituted: July 1, 1855

Government
  - Mayor: Sylvie Tourangeau
  - Federal riding: Beauharnois—Salaberry—Soulanges—Huntingdon
  - Prov. riding: Huntingdon

Area
  - Total: 179.52 km^{2} (69.31 sq mi)
  - Land: 135.03 km^{2} (52.14 sq mi)

Population (2021)
  - Total: 2,754
  - Density: 20.4/km^{2} (53/sq mi)
  - Pop (2016-21): ▲4.9%
  - Dwellings: 1,913
- Time zone: UTC−5 (EST)
  - Summer (DST): UTC−4 (EDT)
- Postal code(s): J0S 1M0
- Area codes: 450 and 579
- Highways: R-132
- Website: www.stanicet.com

Saint-Anicet is a municipality in Le Haut-Saint-Laurent Regional County Municipality in the Montérégie administrative region of Quebec. The population as of the Canada 2021 Census was 2,754.

== History ==
In 1788, the geographic township of Godmanchester was surveyed, and by 1795, a group of Acadians had settled in the area, followed by Irish and French Canadians. In 1810, a mission was established, named after Pope Anicetus. It became the Parish of Saint-Anicet-de-Godmanchester in 1827. In 1851, its post office opened.

On July 1, 1845, the Parish Municipality of Saint-Anicet was formed, but merged into the Municipality of Beauharnois Number Two on September 1, 1847 (along with Dundee, Hinchinbrooke, Hemmingford, Godmanchester, Russeltown, and Ormstown). It was reestablished on July 1, 1855.

On December 10, 2011, the parish municipality changed statutes to become a regular municipality.

== Geography ==
Saint-Anicet is located in the southwestern Montérégie region of Quebec, on the south shore of the Saint Lawrence River.

Climate data for Saint-Anicet (1991-2020 Normals)
Month	Jan	Feb	Mar	Apr	May	Jun	Jul	Aug	Sep	Oct	Nov	Dec	Year
Record high humidex	18.4	17.3	29.2	34.0	42.1	44.9	48.9	49.2	42.5	35.8	26.7	24.8	49.2
Record high °C (°F)	17.5 (63.5)	15.5 (59.9)	27.0 (80.6)	31.0 (87.8)	36.0 (96.8)	35.0 (95.0)	36.0 (96.8)	35.5 (95.9)	34.0 (93.2)	29.5 (85.1)	25.0 (77.0)	20.0 (68.0)	36.0 (96.8)
Mean daily maximum °C (°F)	−4.1 (24.6)	−2.7 (27.1)	2.8 (37.0)	11.3 (52.3)	19.5 (67.1)	24.3 (75.7)	26.7 (80.1)	25.8 (78.4)	21.6 (70.9)	14.0 (57.2)	6.6 (43.9)	−0.3 (31.5)	12.1 (53.8)
Daily mean °C (°F)	−8.7 (16.3)	−7.5 (18.5)	−1.6 (29.1)	6.6 (43.9)	14.0 (57.2)	19.1 (66.4)	21.2 (70.2)	20.3 (68.5)	16.2 (61.2)	9.5 (49.1)	3.0 (37.4)	−4.2 (24.4)	7.3 (45.1)
Mean daily minimum °C (°F)	−13.0 (8.6)	−12.1 (10.2)	−6.2 (20.8)	1.6 (34.9)	8.5 (47.3)	13.8 (56.8)	16.2 (61.2)	15.0 (59.0)	11.0 (51.8)	4.9 (40.8)	−1.0 (30.2)	−7.6 (18.3)	2.6 (36.7)
Record low °C (°F)	−37.2 (−35.0)	−38.0 (−36.4)	−32.5 (−26.5)	−14.5 (5.9)	−3.9 (25.0)	1.0 (33.8)	5.0 (41.0)	2.2 (36.0)	−2.8 (27.0)	−7.8 (18.0)	−20.6 (−5.1)	−32.2 (−26.0)	−38.0 (−36.4)
Record low wind chill	−42.2	−41.2	−53.6	−24.4	−5.6	0.0	0.0	0.0	−5.6	−10.3	−25.3	−39.5	−53.6
Average precipitation mm (inches)	73.2 (2.88)	59.4 (2.34)	66.5 (2.62)	97.0 (3.82)	89.7 (3.53)	104.9 (4.13)	100.4 (3.95)	89.1 (3.51)	99.2 (3.91)	109.3 (4.30)	81.1 (3.19)	77.0 (3.03)	1,046.6 (41.20)
Average rainfall mm (inches)	28.6 (1.13)	18.3 (0.72)	32.1 (1.26)	87.1 (3.43)	89.7 (3.53)	104.9 (4.13)	100.4 (3.95)	89.1 (3.51)	99.2 (3.91)	109.6 (4.31)	71.7 (2.82)	41.2 (1.62)	871.8 (34.32)
Average snowfall cm (inches)	44.1 (17.4)	41.1 (16.2)	32.7 (12.9)	7.6 (3.0)	0.0 (0.0)	0.0 (0.0)	0.0 (0.0)	0.0 (0.0)	0.0 (0.0)	0.8 (0.3)	10.4 (4.1)	33.8 (13.3)	170.4 (67.1)
Average extreme snow depth cm (inches)	20 (7.9)	31 (12)	26 (10)	4 (1.6)	0 (0)	0 (0)	0 (0)	0 (0)	0 (0)	0 (0)	1 (0.4)	9 (3.5)	8 (3.1)
Average precipitation days (≥ 0.2. mm)	16.5	13.6	13.6	14.7	15.0	14.5	14.4	13.4	14.5	15.5	15.4	16.3	177.4
Average rainy days (≥ 0.2 mm)	5.0	4.2	7.8	14.4	15.0	14.5	14.4	13.4	14.5	15.6	13.6	7.7	140.1
Average snowy days (≥ 0.2 cm)	13.3	10.7	7.6	1.7	0.0	0.0	0.0	0.0	0.0	0.21	3.6	9.9	47.0

=== Communities ===
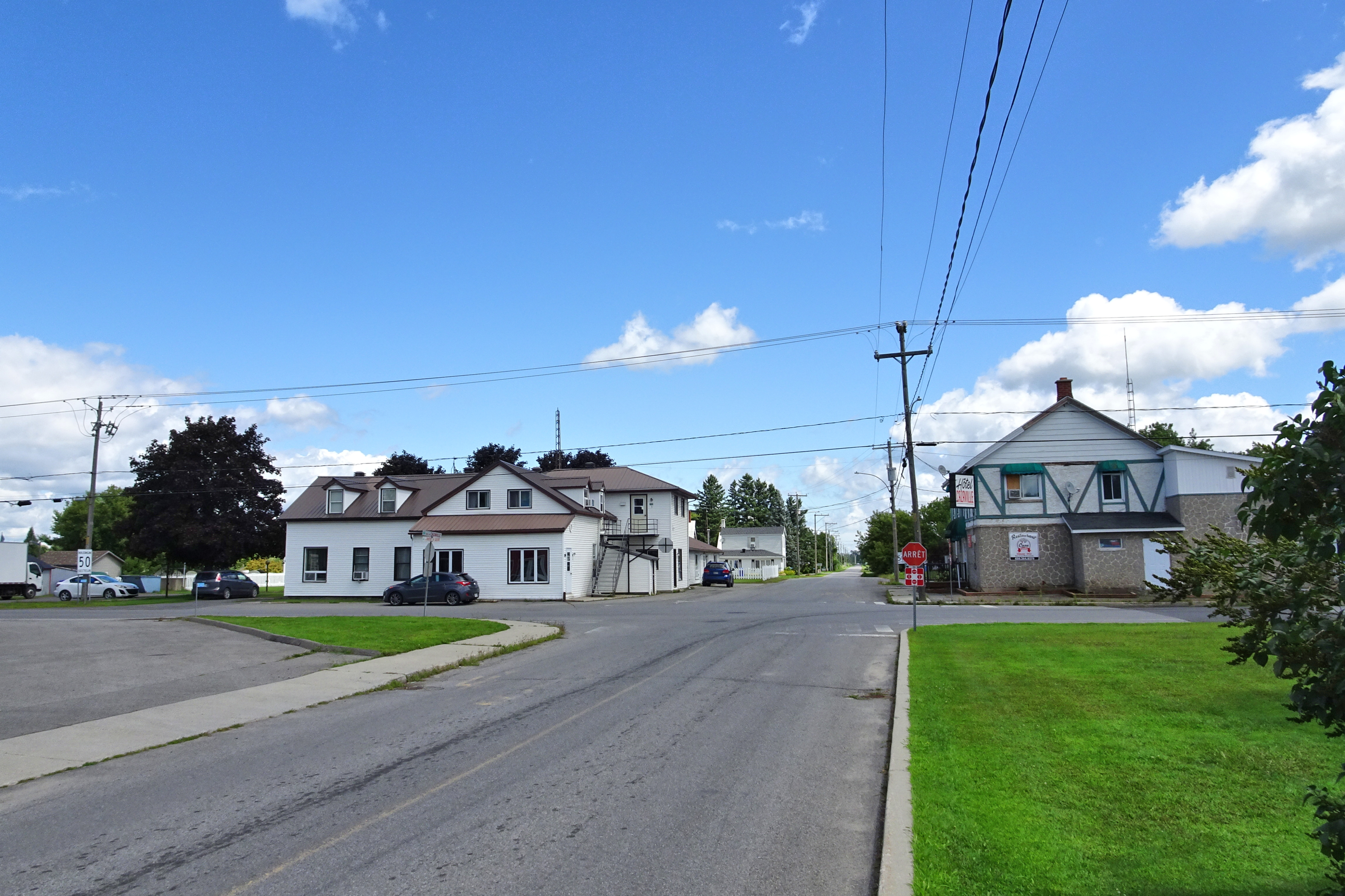
Cazaville

In addition to the namesake main population centre, the following locations reside within the municipality's boundaries:

- Cazaville (45°05′11″N 74°22′17″W) – a hamlet in the southern portion of the municipality on Route 132.
- Plage-Somerville (45°05′15″N 74°25′31″W) – a hamlet located on Baie de Somerville in the Saint Lawrence River.
- Pointe-Leblanc (45°04′30″N 74°26′26″W) – a hamlet located along the Saint Lawrence River.
- Port Lewis (45°10′14″N 74°16′59″W) – a hamlet located along the Saint Lawrence River on Route 132.

=== Lakes and rivers ===
The following waterways pass through or are situated within the municipality's boundaries:

- Rivière La Guerre (45°08′40″N 74°21′03″W) – runs in a southeast to northwest direction to the Saint Lawrence River.

== Demographics ==
=== Population ===
Canada census – Saint-Anicet community profile

	2021	2016	2011
Population	2,754 (+4.9% from 2016)	2,626 (+4.1% from 2011)	2,523 (-7.1% from 2006)
Land area	135.03 km^{2} (52.14 sq mi)	135.33 km^{2} (52.25 sq mi)	135.16 km^{2} (52.19 sq mi)
Population density	20.4/km^{2} (53/sq mi)	19.4/km^{2} (50/sq mi)	18.7/km^{2} (48/sq mi)
Median age	55.2 (M: 55.6, F: 55.2)	52.8 (M: 53.5, F: 52.3)	51.9 (M: 52.8, F: 50.9)
Private dwellings	1,913 (total) 1,309 (occupied)	2,088 (total)	1,965 (total)
Median household income	$66,500	$50,528	$42,911

References: 2021 2016 2011

Historical Census Data - Saint-Anicet, Quebec

Year	Pop.	±%
1861	3,170	—
1871	3,070	−3.2%
1881	3,120	+1.6%
1891	2,093	−32.9%
1901	2,093	+0.0%
1911	1,904	−9.0%
1921	1,737	−8.8%
1931	1,514	−12.8%

Year	Pop.	±%
1941	1,415	−6.5%
1951	1,417	+0.1%
1956	1,593	+12.4%
1961	1,515	−4.9%
1966	1,594	+5.2%
1971	1,721	+8.0%
1976	1,862	+8.2%
1981	1,987	+6.7%

Year	Pop.	±%
1986	2,104	+5.9%
1991	2,215	+5.3%
1996	2,549	+15.1%
2001	2,630	+3.2%
2006	2,717	+3.3%
2011	2,523	−7.1%
2016	2,626	+4.1%
2021	2,754	+4.9%

=== Language ===
Canada Census Mother Tongue Language - Saint-Anicet, Quebec
Census	Total	French			English			French & English			Other		
Year	Responses	Count	Trend	Pop %	Count	Trend	Pop %	Count	Trend	Pop %	Count	Trend	Pop %
2021	2,755	2,185	▲2.8%	79.3%	415	▲5.1%	15.1%	85	▲70.0%	3.1%	60	▲20.0%	2.2%
2016	2,625	2,125	▲4.1%	81.0%	395	0.0%	15.1%	50	▲25.0%	1.9%	50	0.0%	1.9%
2011	2,525	2,040	▼9.3%	80.8%	395	▲27.4%	15.6%	40	▼11.1%	1.6%	50	▼54.5%	2.0%
2006	2,715	2,250	▲9.2%	82.9%	310	▼12.7%	11.4%	45	▼43.8%	1.7%	110	▲15.8%	4.1%
2001	2,590	2,060	▲2.7%	79.5%	355	▼21.1%	13.7%	80	▲166.7%	3.1%	95	▲171.4%	3.7%
1996	2,520	2,005	n/a	79.6%	450	n/a	17.9%	30	n/a	1.2%	35	n/a	1.4%

== Attractions ==
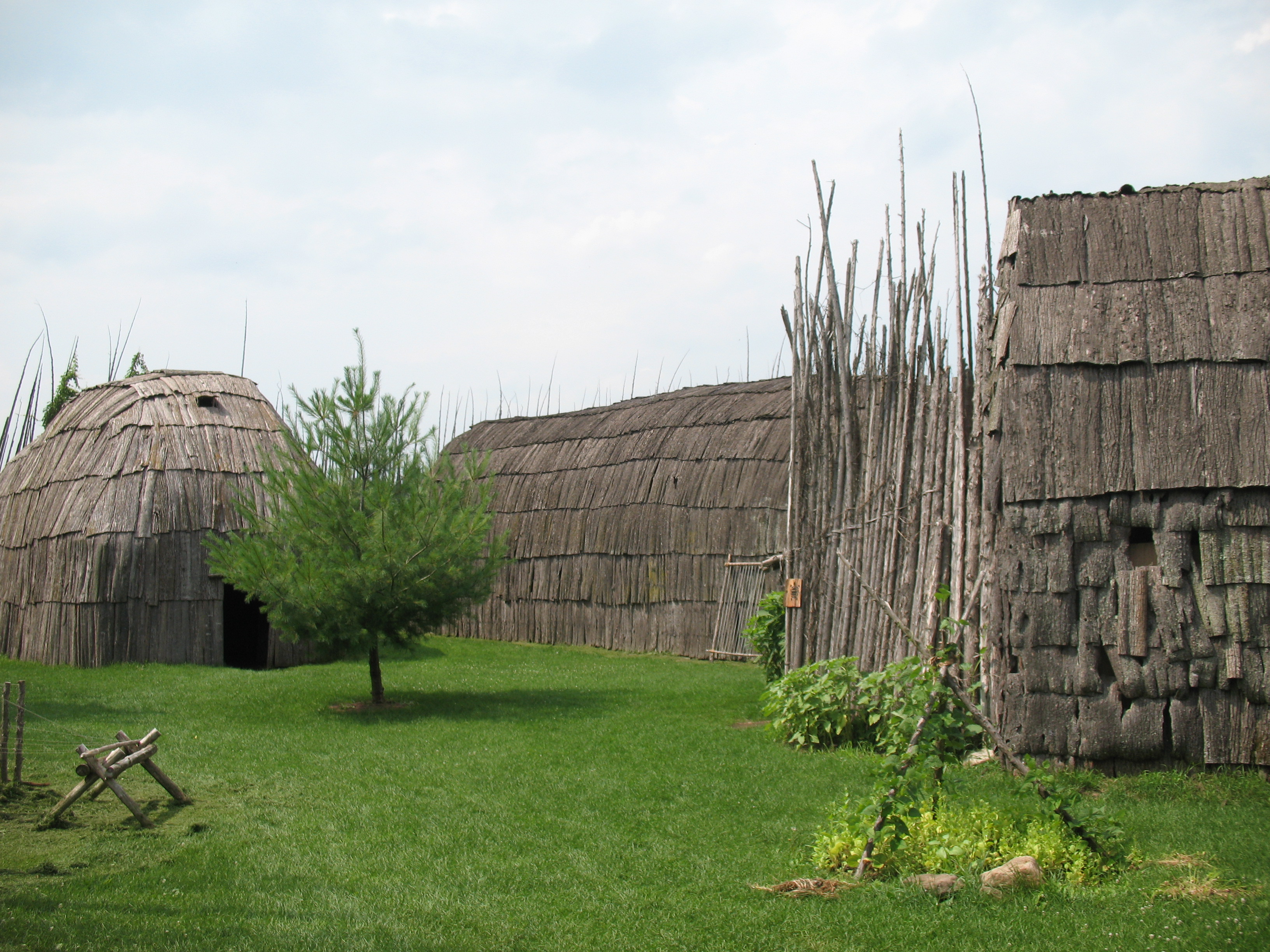
Droulers Tsiionhiakwatha

In the south of Saint-Anicet, the Tsiionhiakwatha/Droulers archaeological site interpretation center is where an important Iroquoian village in Quebec was located. Circa 1450, approximately 500 St.Lawrence Iroquoians established a village near the La Guerre River. The centre opened on May 15, 2010.

Droulers-Tsiionhiakwatha was designated a Site du patrimoine constitué under provincial legislation in 2005, and a National Historic Site of Canada in 2007.

== Government ==
List of former mayors:

- John McDonell (1855–1858)
- Luc Hyacinthe Maçon (1858–1860)
- Augustin Dupuis (1860–1864, 1866–1872)
- Edward Dupuis (1864–1866, 1872–1875, 1886–1888)
- Louïs Napoléon Mason (1875–1886, 1889–1890)
- Johan D. Mac Donald (1890–1892, 1895–1896)
- Alexis Caza (1892–1894)
- Patrick W. Leehy (1888–1889, 1894–1895, 1897–1899, 1902–1903, 1905–1906, 1909–1910)
- Joseph Edouard Dupuis (1896–1897, 1899–1902, 1903–1905, 1906–1907)
- Anicet N. Castagnier (1907–1908)
- Eusèbe Génier (1908–1909, 1910–1912)
- Ronald Rankin (1912–1913, 1916–1917)
- John Leahy (1913–1914)
- Napoléon Leblanc (1914–1915)
- Olivier Dupuis (1915–1916)
- Joseph Avila Caza (1917–1925, 1929–1933)
- Joseph Alfred Primeau (1925–1927)
- François Xavier Beauchesne (1927–1929)
- F. Emilio Latreille (1933–1935)
- James B. Narey (1935–1939)
- Joseph Charles Idala Caza (1939–1947)
- Edmour Castagner (1947–1949)
- Charles Trépanier (1949–1953, 1955–1959)
- Lucien Perron (1953–1955, 1959–1980)
- Joseph Cléo Renaud Caza (1980–1981)
- René Brisebois (1981–1990)
- Pierre Caza (1990–1994)
- Claude Gilles Pilon (1994–1998)
- Alain Castagner (1998–2017)
- Gino Moretti (2017–present)

== Notable people ==
- Jules Léger - 21st Governor General of Canada

== See also ==
- La Guerre River
- List of anglophone communities in Quebec
- List of municipalities in Quebec
