= Pointe-Calumet =

- Municipality
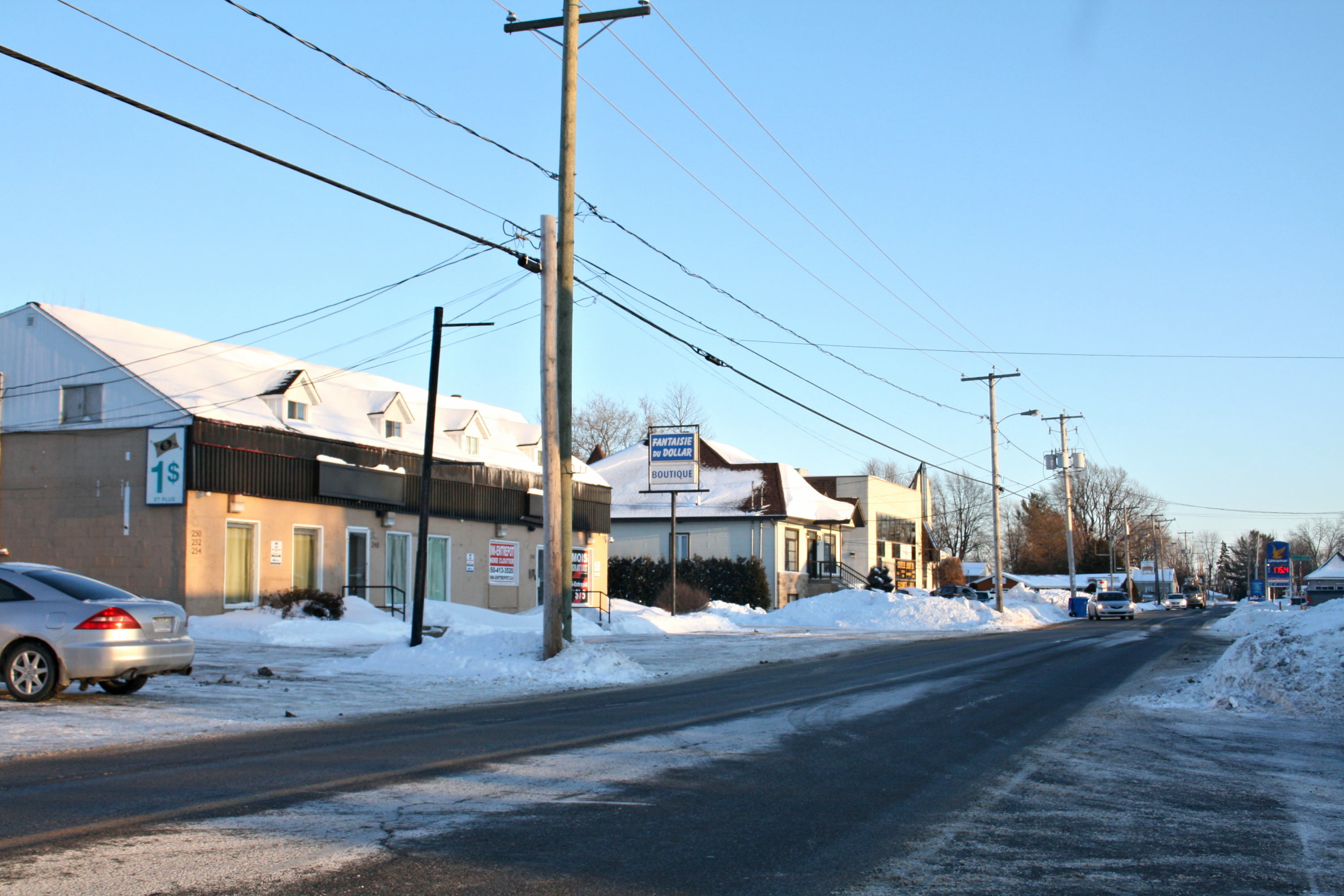
- Pointe-Calumet in winter

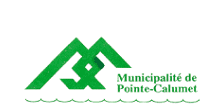

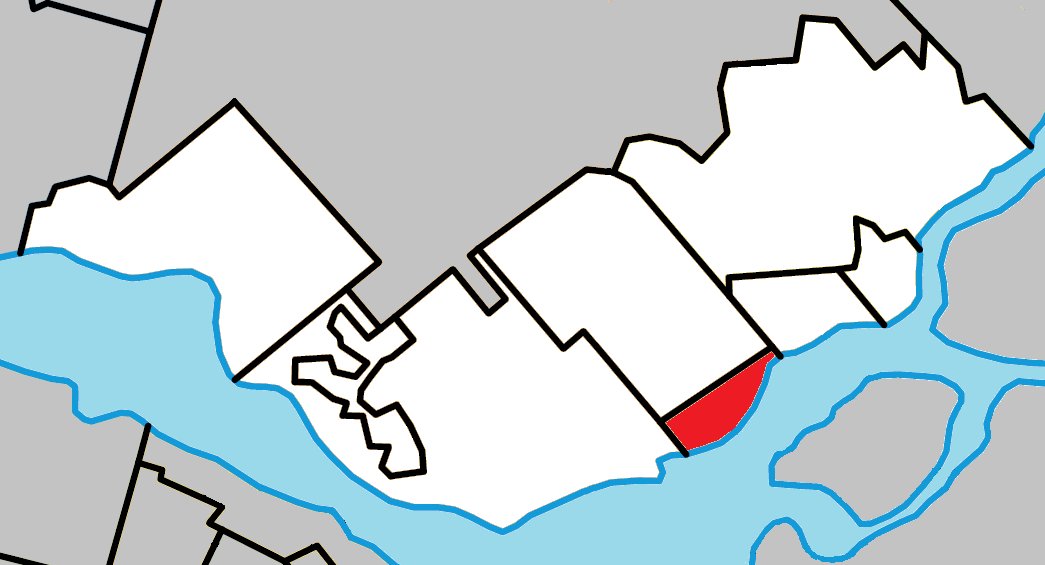
- Location within Deux-Montagnes RCM

- Location in central Quebec
- Coordinates: 45°30′N 73°58′W
- Country: Canada
- Province: Quebec
- Region: Laurentides
- RCM: Deux-Montagnes
- Constituted: February 12, 1953

Government
  - Mayor: Sonia Fontaine
  - Federal riding: Mirabel
  - Prov. riding: Mirabel

Area
  - Total: 11.60 km^{2} (4.48 sq mi)
  - Land: 4.59 km^{2} (1.77 sq mi)

Population (2021)
  - Total: 6,281
  - Density: 1,367.7/km^{2} (3,542/sq mi)
  - Pop 2016-2021: ▼2.3%
  - Dwellings: 2,673
- Time zone: UTC−5 (EST)
  - Summer (DST): UTC−4 (EDT)
- Postal code(s): J0N 1G0
- Area codes: 450 and 579
- Highways: R-344
- Website: www.pointe-calumet.ca

Pointe-Calumet (French pronunciation: [pwɛ̃t kalymɛ]) is a municipality in the Canadian province of Quebec. The municipality is located within the Deux-Montagnes Regional County Municipality in the Laurentides region. It is situated about 30 minutes northwest of Montreal. Its population as of the 2021 Canadian Census is just over 6000.

== History ==
Pointe-Calumet was declared a municipality in 1952 after being part of the Saint-Joseph-du-Lac parish where about 30 families were living prior of being a municipality. However, with the presence of numerous beaches nearby, visitors from the Montreal region visited the area on weekends.

== Geography ==
The town is located on the northern shore of the Ottawa River, the Rivière des Mille Îles, and the Lake of Two Mountains, all of which join the Saint Lawrence River, to its south, near the West Island of Montreal Island.

Pointe-Calumet is accessible from the Montreal area and points east from Quebec Autoroute 640, which runs from Laval, Saint-Eustache, Terrebonne, and Repentigny. Quebec Route 344 also runs through the village and links the northern Montreal suburbs as well as the Grenville area, north of Hawkesbury, Ontario. Pointe-Calumet is also located near the Montreal commuter train that runs from Downtown Montreal to Deux-Montagnes.

The town is located within the provincial electoral district of Deux-Montagnes, which also includes the municipality of the same name to its east.

== Demographics ==
Population trend:

- Population in 2021: 6,281 (2016 to 2021 population change: -2.3%)
- Population in 2016: 6,428 (2011 to 2016 population change: 0.5%)
- Population in 2011: 6,396 (2006 to 2011 population change: -2.7%)
- Population in 2006: 6,574 (2001 to 2006 population change: 17.3%)
- Population in 2001: 5,604
- Population in 1996: 5,443
- Population in 1991: 4,482
- Population in 1986: 3,450
- Population in 1981: 2,935
- Population in 1976: 2,483
- Population in 1971: 2,214
- Population in 1966: 1,157
- Population in 1961: 514
- Population in 1956: 253

Private dwellings occupied by usual residents: 2,590 (total dwellings: 2,673)

Mother tongue:

- English as first language: 3.3%
- French as first language: 91.4%
- English and French as first language: 1.9%
- Other as first language: 3.0%

== Attractions ==
The town's major attraction is the Super Aqua Club, is one of the biggest waterparks in the province along with the Water Parks at Mont Saint-Sauveur. Opened in 1984, the park contains about 40 attractions. The Beach Club is today the main beach of the area. The town is also located beside the Oka National Park as well as beside the village of Oka. Saint-Placide is located 10 kilometres (6.2 mi) to the west beside Oka.

== Government ==
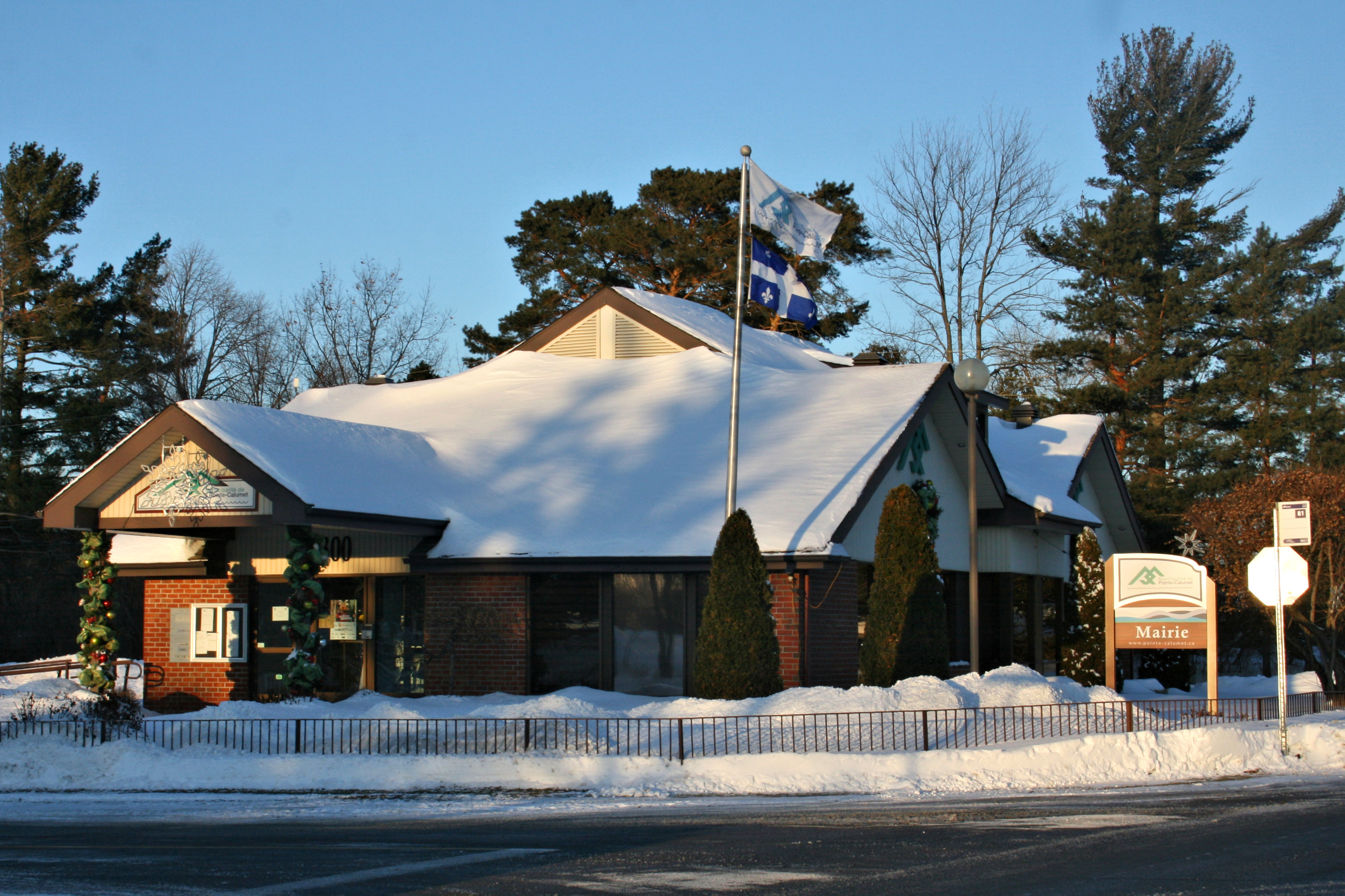
Pointe-Calumet town hall

Municipal council:

- Sonia Fontaine, mayor
- Serge Bédard, councilor (district 1)
- Richard Handfield, councilor (district 2)
- Samuel Champagne, councilor (district 3)
- Patrick Beauchamp, councilor (district 4)
- Barbara Legault, councilor (district 5)
- Chantal Chartrand, councilor (district 6)

== Infrastructure ==
Pointe-Calumet is served by routes 80 and 81 of the Exo Laurentides sector from Terminus Saint-Eustache via the Deux-Montagnes station.

== Education ==
The Commission scolaire de la Seigneurie-des-Mille-Îles (CSSMI) operates Francophone public schools. The community is zoned to École des Perséides in Pointe-Calumet and École polyvalente Deux-Montagnes in Deux-Montagnes.

The Sir Wilfrid Laurier School Board operates Anglophone schools. Lake of Two Mountains High School in Deux-Montagnes serves this community. Mountainview Elementary School and Saint Jude Elementary School, both in Deux-Montagnes, also serve this community.

== See also ==
- List of municipalities in Quebec
- Oka National Park
