= Quebec Autoroute 13 =

Highway in Quebec

Autoroute 13
- Autoroute Chomedey
- A-13 highlighted in red

Route information
- Maintained by Transports Québec
- Length: 21.9 km (13.6 mi)
- Existed: 1975–present

Major junctions
- South end: A-20 in Montréal
- A-520 in Dorval; A-40 (TCH) in Montreal; A-440 in Laval
- North end: A-640 in Boisbriand

Location
- Country: Canada
- Province: Quebec
- Major cities: Montréal, Laval, Boisbriand, Dorval

Highway system
- Quebec provincial highways; Autoroutes; List; Former
| ← A-10 | → A-15 |

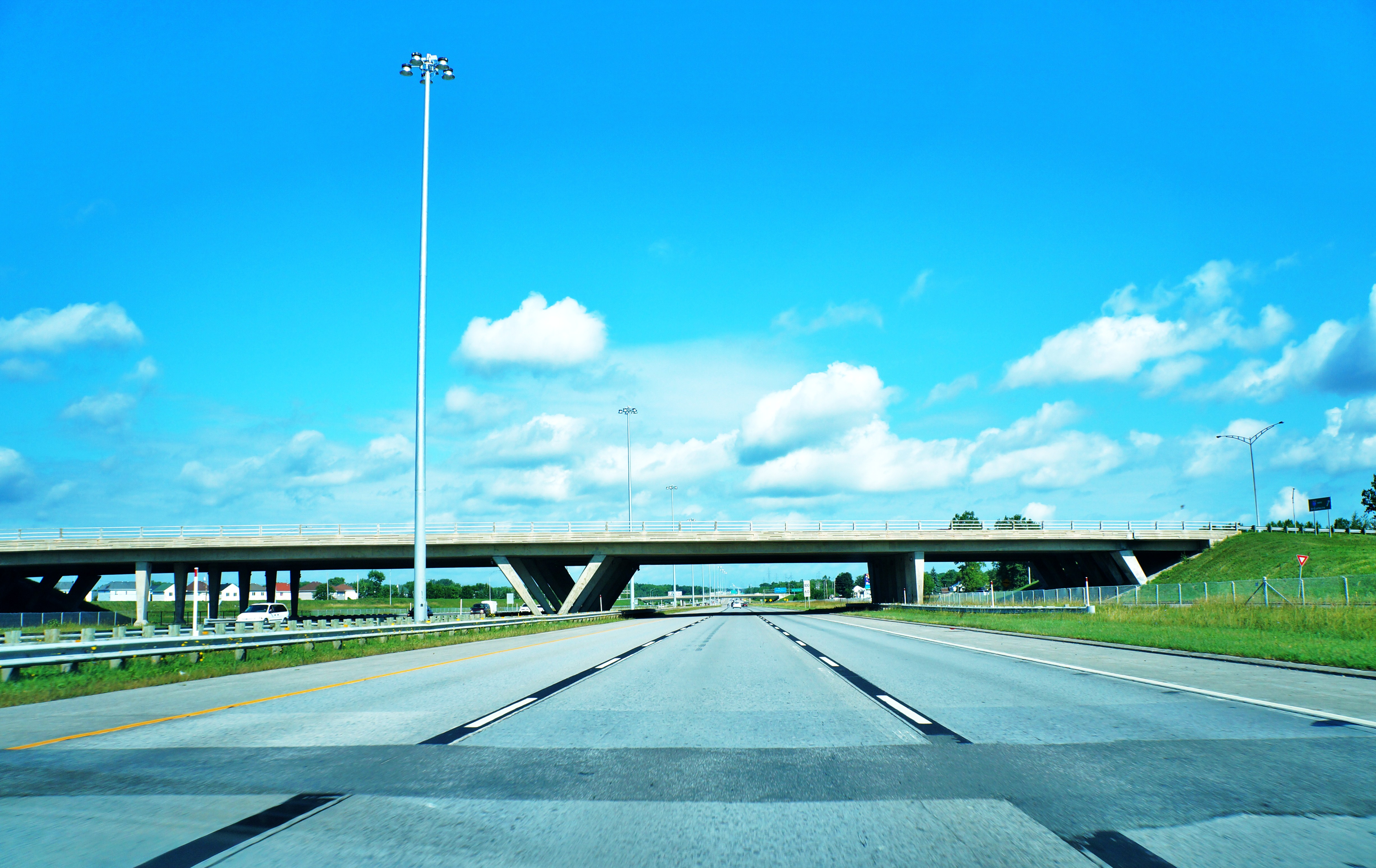
Highway 13 north in Laval

Autoroute 13 (or A-13, also known as Autoroute Chomedey with sections formerly known as Autoroute Mirabel), is a freeway in the urban region of Montreal, Quebec, Canada. Its southern end is at the junction of A-20 on the Island of Montreal near Pierre Elliott Trudeau International Airport. Its northern terminus is at the junction of A-640 near Boisbriand. The road traverses Laval. A-13 is mostly six-laned and tolls were removed.

Autoroute 13 was originally built as a toll highway in 1975, ultimately to connect the two international airports, Mirabel and Dorval (now Trudeau International Airport). However A-13 was not built beyond its interim terminus at A-640, leaving only A-15 to connect Mirabel with Montréal island.

The designation of Autoroute Chomedey refers to the community of Chomedey in Laval, through which A-13 passes. Formerly, common usage was to refer to the autoroute as Autoroute Chomedey south of the Milles-Îles river, and Autoroute Mirabel north of that point. In recent usage, however, the Autoroute Chomedey name is generally used for the full length of the autoroute. Boulevard Pitfield is routed as a parallel service road to A-13 in St-Laurent.

Boulevard Pitfield derives its name from the origin of the actual route. In the 1920s, the actual route was a Polo Pony Trail leading from the various estates of the Saraguay Village residents to their Polo Fields, now where the area of St. Laurent Blvd and Bois Franc merge. In the late 1930s the path became an unpaved local road. Over the next several decades Saraguay Farms, owned by Mrs. W.C. Pitfield, was paid to clear the road in the winter by the municipality of St. Laurent. The road was developed into a two-lane highway in the 1960s.

The Quebec provincial government was planning to extend Autoroute 13 north of A-640 in the late 1990s as an alternate route for A-15 (Autoroute Décarie/Autoroute des Laurentides).

== Exit list ==
| RCM | Location | km | mi | Exit | Destinations | Notes |
|---|---|---|---|---|---|---|
| Montréal | Montréal | 0.0 | 0.0 | 1 | A-20 (Autoroute du Souvenir) / 32 Avenue / rue Victoria – Centre-Ville Montréal, Aéroport P.-E.-Trudeau, Toronto | Exit 60 on A-20 |
| Montréal | Montréal | 1.7 | 1.1 | 2 | Rue Hickmore / Rue Louis-A.-Amos | |
| Montréal | Montréal – Dorval boundary | 3.2 | 2.0 | 3 | A-520 (Autoroute de la Côte-de-Liesse) – Aéroport P.-E.-Trudeau | Signed as exits 3E (east) and 3O (west); exit 4 on A-520 |
| Montréal | Montréal – Dorval boundary | 3.8– 4.2 | 2.4– 2.6 | Tunnel under Montréal–Trudeau International Airport | | |
| Montréal | Montréal | 6.1 | 3.8 | 6 | A-40 (TCH) – Ottawa, Gatineau, Québec | Exit 60 on A-40 |
| Montréal | Montréal | 7.5– 8.8 | 4.7– 5.5 | 8 | Boulevard Henri-Bourassa / Boulevard Gouin | |
| Rivière des Prairies | | 9.1– 9.6 | 5.7– 6.0 | Pont Louis Bisson | | |
| Laval | | 10.1 | 6.3 | 12 | Boulevard Samson / Boulevard Notre-Dame / Boulevard Saint-Martin | Northbound exit; south end of collector/distributor lanes |
| Laval | | 13.3 | 8.3 | 12 | Boulevard Samson / Boulevard Notre-Dame | Southbound exit |
| Laval | | 14.0– 16.5 | 8.7– 10.3 | 15 | A-440 (Autoroute Jean-Noël-Lavoie) to R-148 (Avenue des Bois) | Exit 17 on A-440 |
| Laval | | 14.0– 16.5 | 8.7– 10.3 | 15 | Boulevard Dagenais | Northbound exit |
| Laval | | 14.0– 16.5 | 8.7– 10.3 | 15 | Boulevard Saint-Martin | Southbound exit |
| Laval | | 16.8 | 10.4 | 17 | Boulevard Sainte-Rose | Northbound exit |
| Laval | | 18.4 | 11.4 | 17 | Boulevard Dagenais / Boulevard Sainte-Rose | Southbound exit; north end of collector/distributor lanes |
| Rivière des Mille Îles | | 18.6– 19.4 | 11.6– 12.1 | Pont Vachon | | |
| Thérèse-De Blainville | Boisbriand | 20.2 | 12.6 | 20 | R-344 (Chemin de la Grande-Côte) – Boisbriand, Saint-Eustache | |
| Thérèse-De Blainville | Boisbriand | 21.9 | 13.6 | 22 | A-640 – Repentigny, Saint-Eustache, Oka | Signed as exits 22E (east) and 22O (west); exit 16 on A-640 |
1.000 mi = 1.609 km; 1.000 km = 0.621 mi: Incomplete access

- Lowest Annual Average Daily Traffic: 38 000 (between R-344 and A-640 in 2000)
- Highest Annual Average Daily Traffic: 140 000 (between A-40 and A-440 in 2000)
