= Saint-Joseph-du-Lac =

- Municipality
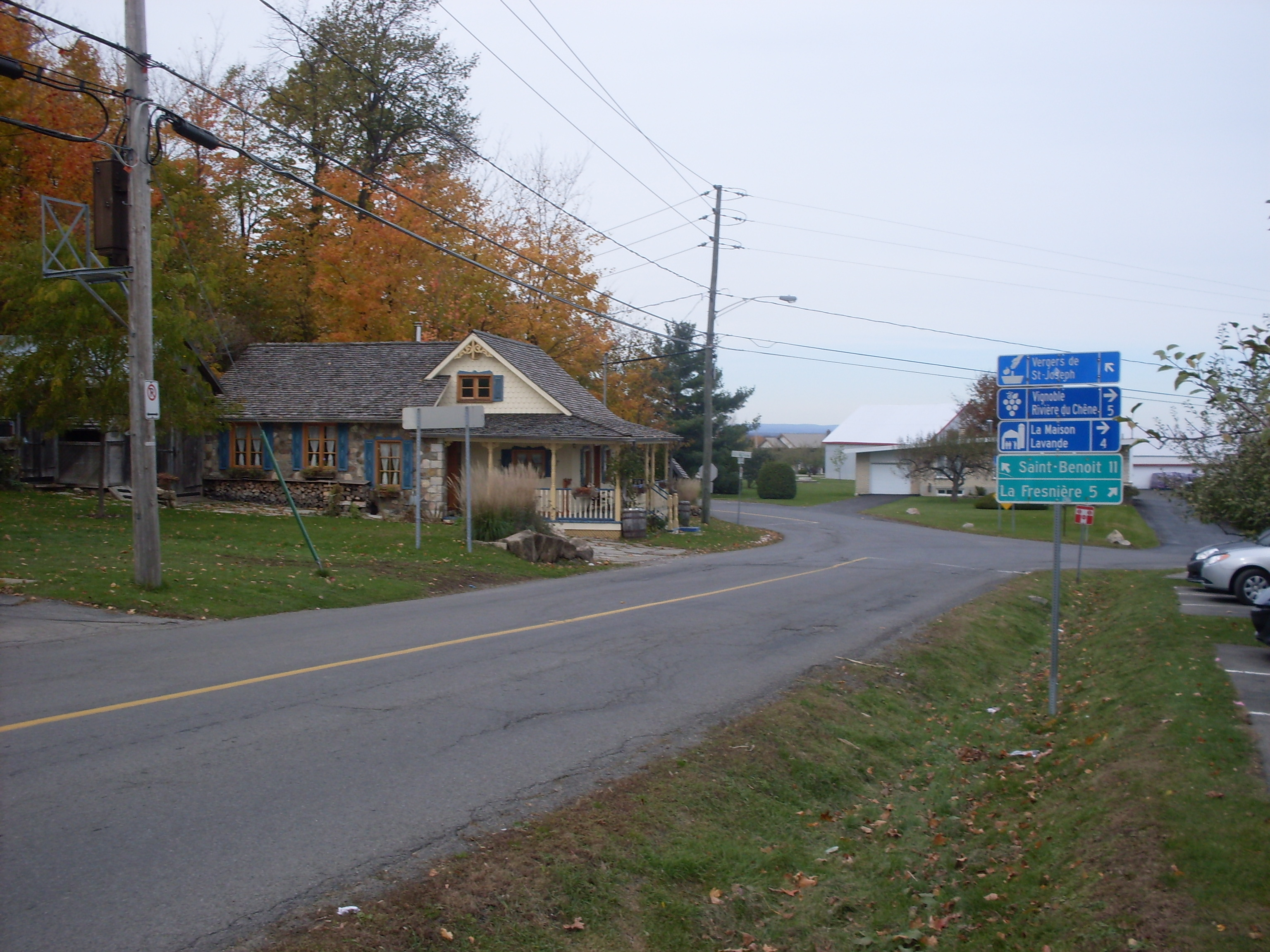
- Principal Road

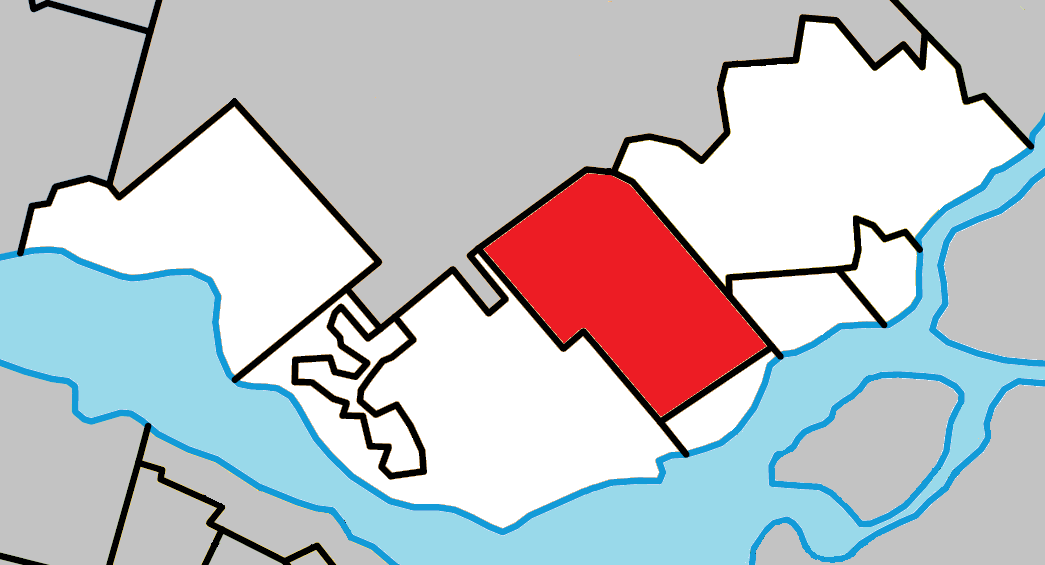
- Location within Deux-Montagnes RCM.

- Location in central Quebec.
- Coordinates: 45°32′N 74°00′W
- Country: Canada
- Province: Quebec
- Region: Laurentides
- RCM: Deux-Montagnes
- Constituted: July 1, 1855

Government
  - Mayor: Benoit Proulx
  - Federal riding: Mirabel
  - Prov. riding: Mirabel

Area
  - Total: 41.80 km^{2} (16.14 sq mi)
  - Land: 41.22 km^{2} (15.92 sq mi)

Population (2021)
  - Total: 7,031
  - Density: 170.6/km^{2} (442/sq mi)
  - Pop 2016-2021: ▲5.1%
  - Dwellings: 2,819
- Time zone: UTC−5 (EST)
  - Summer (DST): UTC−4 (EDT)
- Postal code(s): J0N 1M0
- Area codes: 450 and 579
- Highways A-640: R-344
- Website: www.sjdl.qc.ca

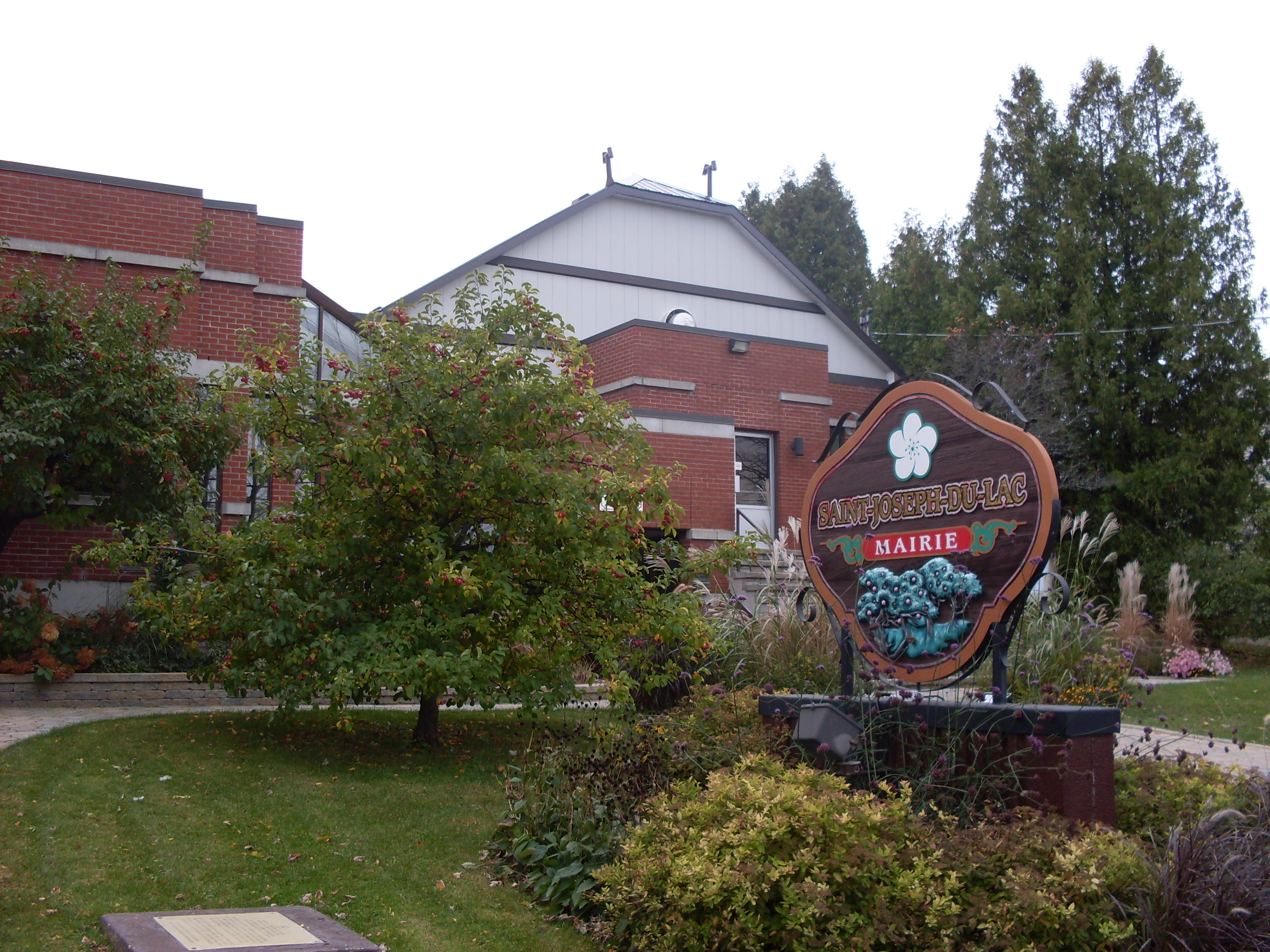
Municipal office of Saint-Joseph-du-Lac

Saint-Joseph-du-Lac (French pronunciation: [sɛ̃ ʒozɛf dy lak]) is a municipality in the Laurentides region of Quebec, Canada, part of the Deux-Montagnes Regional County Municipality.

== History ==
The territory of the municipality of Saint-Joseph-du-Lac was part of the Lac des Deux-Montagnes Seigneury for over a hundred years. This seigneury was granted on October 17, 1717, to the Sulpician Order of the Ecclesiastical Seminary of St. Sulpice in Paris, who already were lords of the Island of Montreal. In 1783, the Sulpicians signed a total of 25 concessions. Over the next ten years, from 1782 to 1793, 81 lands on the Saint-Joseph side were granted to settlers. In 1803, Côte Saint-Joseph Road was extended northward to allow settlers to travel to Saint-Benoît.

Around 1850, the inhabitants of the Saint-Joseph Concession started the process if obtaining a parish, which was formally established in 1853. Two years later on July 1, 1855, the Parish Municipality of Saint-Joseph was formed. It extended over a length of 10 kilometres (6.2 mi) from Lake of Two Mountains to the limits of Saint-Benoît Parish, and a width of 3.5 kilometres (2.2 mi). The population at that time was 1020 people in about 180 families.

In 1856, the post office opened, being identified as Saint-Joseph-du-Lac in order to distinguish it from the many other locations called Saint-Joseph. In time this name also came to be used for the entire municipality.

In 1953, the southern portion of the municipality along Lake of Two Mountains separated from Saint-Joseph-du-Lac and became the Village Municipality of Pointe-Calumet.

In the 1970s, Autoroute 640 was built through Saint-Joseph-du-Lac, putting economic pressure on the municipality. This led to new housing developments for Montreal commuters and a noticeable growth in population that had previously been stable for nearly 80 years. During the following two decades, several more new developments were built, including the Paquin, Brunet, and Parc Sectors.

== Demographics ==
Population trend:

- Population in 2021: 7,031 (2016 to 2021 population change: 5.1%)
- Population in 2016: 6,687 (2011 to 2016 population change: 7.9%)
- Population in 2011: 6,195 (2006 to 2011 population change: 24.9%)
- Population in 2006: 4,958 (2001 to 2006 population change: 1.6%)
- Population in 2001: 4,882
- Population in 1996: 4,930
- Population in 1991: 4,312
- Population in 1986: 2,691
- Population in 1981: 2,272
- Population in 1976: 1,959
- Population in 1971: 1,954
- Population in 1966: 1,663
- Population in 1961: 1,532
- Population in 1956: 1,348
- Population in 1951: 1,463
- Population in 1941: 1,348
- Population in 1931: 1,118
- Population in 1921: 1,056
- Population in 1911: 1,099
- Population in 1901: 1,091
- Population in 1891: 1,153
- Population in 1881: 1,167
- Population in 1871: 1,292
- Population in 1861: 1,346

Private dwellings occupied by usual residents: 2,743 (total dwellings: 2,819)

Mother tongue:

- English as first language: 3.0%
- French as first language: 93.0%
- English and French as first language: 1.2%
- Other as first language: 2.5%

== Infrastructure ==
Saint-Joseph-du-Lac is served on Highway 344 by routes 80 and 81 of the Exo Laurentides sector from Terminus Saint-Eustache via the Deux-Montagnes station. The other end for both routes is in Pointe-Calumet.

== Education ==
The Commission scolaire de la Seigneurie-des-Mille-Îles (CSSMI) operates Francophone public schools.

- École Rose-des-Vents
- École du Grand Pommier

Secondary students are zoned to École secondaire d'Oka in Oka.

The Sir Wilfrid Laurier School Board is the area English school board. Several Anglophone schools in Deux-Montagnes serve this community: Mountainview Elementary School, Saint Jude Elementary School, and Lake of Two Mountains High School.
