= Quebec Autoroute 640 =

Autoroute 640
- Autoroute 640
- Map of Greater Montreal with the A-640 in red

Route information
- Maintained by Transports Québec
- Length: 53.2 km (33.1 mi)
- Existed: 1961–present

Major junctions
- West end: R-344 in Oka
- A-13 in Boisbriand; A-15 (TCH) in Sainte-Thérèse; A-40 in Charlemagne
- East end: R-344 in Charlemagne

Location
- Country: Canada
- Province: Quebec
- Major cities: Terrebonne, Blainville, Saint-Eustache, Mascouche, Boisbriand

Highway system
- Quebec provincial highways; Autoroutes; List; Former
← A-610	→ A-730

Autoroute 640 (or A-640) is a Quebec autoroute that runs across the North Shore Region (paralleling the Rivière des Mille-Îles) from Route 344 in the Oka area to Route 138, where it ends as a four-lane expressway in Charlemagne. The road was designed to be northern bypass of the city of Montréal and was originally intended to cross the Lake of Two Mountains to connect to Autoroute 40 near Vaudreuil. It is currently 53.2 km (33.1 mi) long.

A-640 begins at Chemin d'Oka (Route 344) at a traffic circle near Oka National Park, and terminates at a signalized at-grade intersection with Rue Émile-Despins (Route 344) in Charlemagne.

== History ==
A-640 was built over the following timeline:

- From Boul. des Promenades to A-15/TCH: 1961
- From Route 337 to A-40: 1972
- From A-15/TCH to Route 337: 1974
- From Route 344 to Boul. des Promenades: 1976

== Exit list ==
RCM	Location	km	mi	Exit	Destinations	Notes
Deux-Montagnes	Saint-Joseph-du-Lac	0.00	0.00	–	R-344 – Oka, Pointe-Calumet, Parc national d'Oka	Traffic circle
Deux-Montagnes	Saint-Joseph-du-Lac	2.3	1.4	2	Saint-Joseph-du-Lac, Pointe-Calumet	Westbound exit and eastbound entrance
Deux-Montagnes	Saint-Eustache–Deux-Montagnes	8.3	5.2	8	Boulevard des Promenades – Deux-Montagnes, Sainte-Marthe-sur-le-Lac	
Deux-Montagnes	Saint-Eustache	11.5	7.1	11	R-148 (Boulevard Arthur-Sauvé) – Lachute, Saint-Eustache	
Deux-Montagnes	Saint-Eustache	14.2	8.8	14	25^{e} Avenue	
Thérèse-De Blainville	Boisbriand	16.6	10.3	16	A-13 south (Autoroute Chomedey) – Laval, Montréal, Aéroport P.-E.-Trudeau	Northern terminus of A-13; exit 22 on A-13
Thérèse-De Blainville	Boisbriand	19.4	12.1	19	Boisbriand	Westbound exit is via exit 20
Thérèse-De Blainville	Boisbriand–Sainte-Thérèse	20.3	12.6	20	A-15 (TCH) (Autoroute des Laurentides) – Blainville, Saint-Jérôme, Montréal, Aéroport Mirabel	Exit 20 on A-15
Thérèse-De Blainville	Sainte-Thérèse–Rosemère	22.1	13.7	22	R-117 – Sainte-Thérèse, Blainville, Rosemère	
Thérèse-De Blainville	Blainville	24.5	15.2	24	Montée Lesage / Chemin du-Bas-de-Sainte-Thérèse	
Thérèse-De Blainville	Lorraine	26.7	16.6	26	Lorraine	Access via Boulevard de Gaulle
Thérèse-De Blainville	Bois-des-Filion	28.2	17.5	28	R-335 – Bois-des-Filion, Sainte-Anne-des-Plaines	Future A-25 south
Les Moulins	Terrebonne	31.7	19.7	32	Avenue Urbanova	Eastbound exit and entrance
Les Moulins	Terrebonne	35.8	22.2	35	Boulevard des Entreprises / Boulevard des Seigneurs	
Les Moulins	Mascouche–Terrebonne	38.9	24.2	38	R-337 (Chemin Gascon) / Chemin des Anglais – Terrebonne, Mascouche	
Les Moulins	Mascouche–Terrebonne	42.7	26.5	42	A-25 / R-125 (Montée Masson) – Mascouche, Rawdon, Montréal	Signed as exits 42S (south) and 42N (north); exit 25 on A-25
Les Moulins	Mascouche–Terrebonne	45.0	28.0	44	Chemin Charles-Aubert / Rue Louis-Hébert	
Les Moulins	Terrebonne	45.7	28.4	45	Montée Dumais	
Les Moulins	Terrebonne	51.0	31.7	50	Montée des Pionniers	
L'Assomption–Les Moulins	Terrebonne–Charlemagne	52.4	32.6	52	A-40 (Autoroute Félix-Leclerc) – Montréal, Québec, Aéroport P.-E.-Trudeau	Signed as exits 52-E (east) and 52-O (west)
Les Moulins	Charlemagne	53.2	33.1	–	R-344 to R-138 – Terrebonne, Repentigny	At-grade intersection
1.000 mi = 1.609 km; 1.000 km = 0.621 mi: Incomplete access

== Municipalities along Autoroute 640 ==
- Oka
- Saint-Joseph-du-Lac
- Sainte-Marthe-sur-le-Lac
- Deux-Montagnes
- Saint-Eustache
- Boisbriand
- Rosemère
- Lorraine
- Bois-des-Filion
- Terrebonne
- Charlemagne
