= Ó:IASE =

The Ó:IASE (pronounced O-yi-assé), also notated as Óiase, is a cultivar of apple developed in the Canadian province of Quebec.

The Ó:IASE was developed by Roland Joannin and the apple-breeding collective La Pomme de Demain. It is a hybrid of the Honeycrisp and Pitchounette varieties of apple: in 2007, Pitchounette pollen was inserted into a Honeycrisp flower with a brush, and the first Ó:IASEs became commercially available 17 years later.

== Name ==
Because their test orchard was in Saint-Joseph-du-Lac, which is close to Kanesatake, Joannin decided that the new variety should have a Mohawk name. In 2018, he asked Hilda Nicholas, of the Mohawk Language Custodians Association, for a suggestion; she devised "Ó:IASE", where the "Ó" indicates that the item is a natural object, the colon is a pause, "IA" means 'apple', and "SE" means 'new'. This spelling caused Joannin significant difficulties when he registered the Ó:IASE with the Canadian Food Inspection Agency's Plant Breeders' Rights Office, as their system was unable to accept acute accents or punctuation; consequently, it is registered as QS250 (the serial number with which the initial Honeycrisp/Pitchounette hybrid was tracked).
