= Sainte-Marthe-sur-le-Lac =

- City
- City of Sainte-Marthe-sur-le-Lac; Ville de Sainte-Marthe-sur-le-Lac
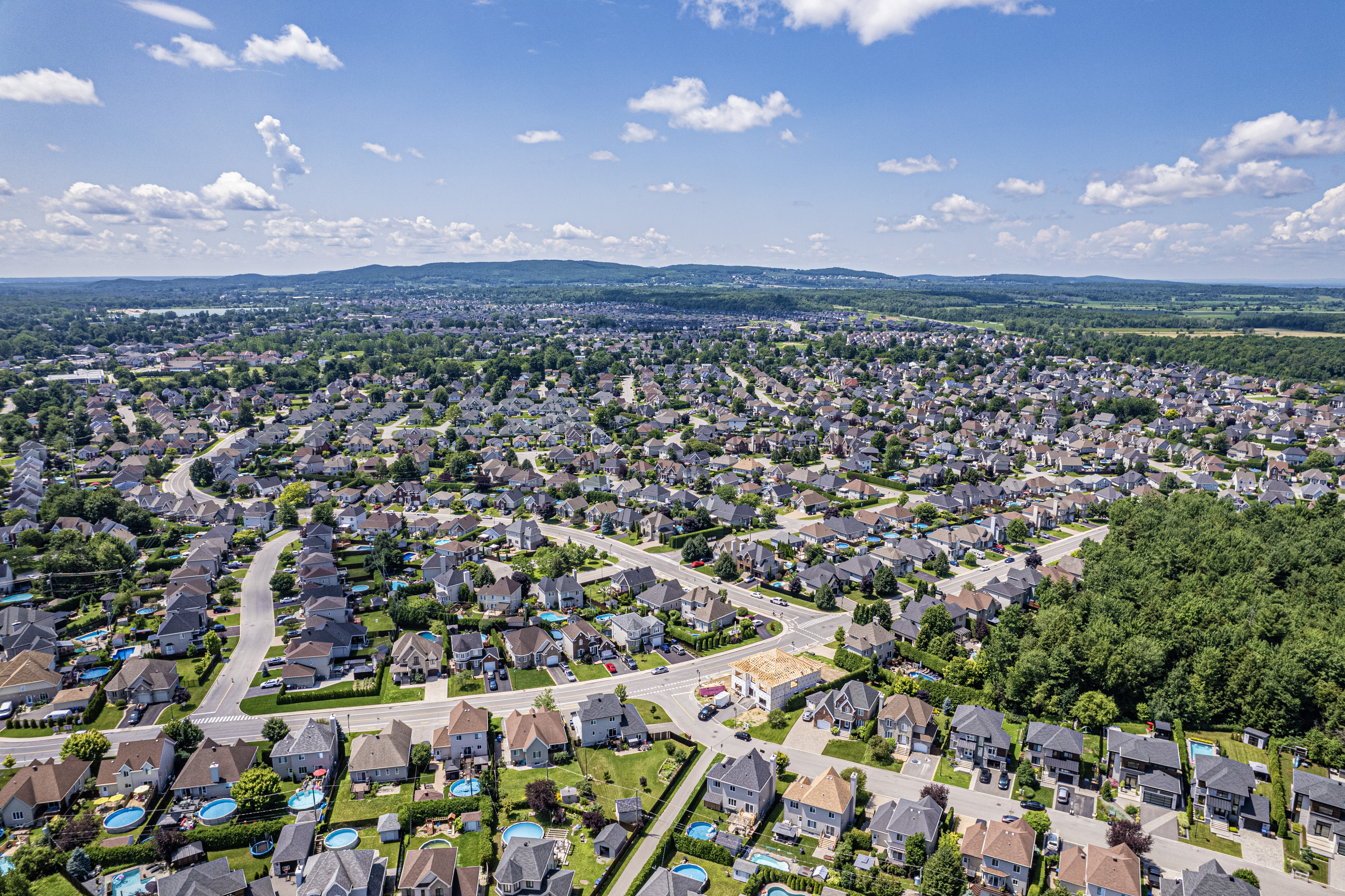
- Aerial view of Sainte-Marthe-sur-le-Lac

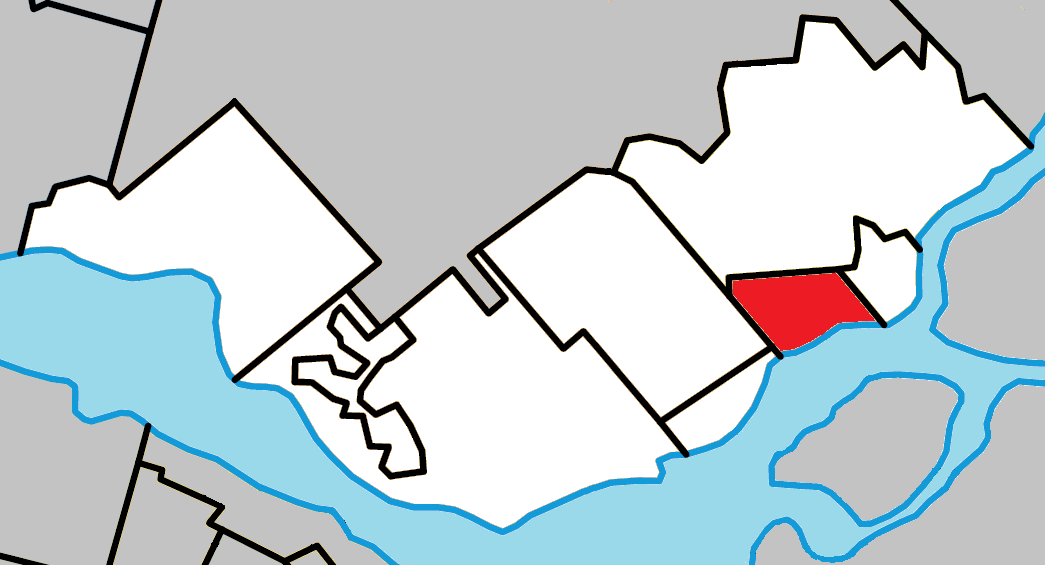
- Location within Deux-Montagnes RCM

- Location in central Quebec
- Coordinates: 45°32′N 73°56′W
- Country: Canada
- Province: Quebec
- Region: Laurentides
- RCM: Deux-Montagnes
- Constituted: January 1, 1960

Government
  - Mayor: François Robillard
  - Federal riding: Mirabel
  - Prov. riding: Mirabel

Area
  - Total: 12.80 km^{2} (4.94 sq mi)
  - Land: 8.73 km^{2} (3.37 sq mi)

Population (2021)
  - Total: 19,797
  - Density: 2,067.4/km^{2} (5,355/sq mi)
  - Pop 2016-2021: ▲9.5%
  - Dwellings: 7,642
- Time zone: UTC−5 (EST)
  - Summer (DST): UTC−4 (EDT)
- Postal code(s): J0N
- Area codes: 450 and 579
- Highways A-640: R-344
- Website: www.ville.sainte-marthe-sur-le-lac.qc.ca

Sainte-Marthe-sur-le-Lac (French pronunciation: [sɛ̃t maʁt syʁ lə lak], lit. 'Sainte-Marthe on the Lake') is an off-island suburb of Montreal, in the Canadian province of Quebec, in the Deux-Montagnes Regional County Municipality, 40 kilometres (25 mi) from Montreal. It is crossed from east to west by Route 344, commonly known as Oka Road. The town shares its borders with Deux-Montagnes to the east, Saint-Joseph-du-Lac to the west, the Lake of Two Mountains to the south, and Saint-Eustache to the north.

It shares police, firefighters, waterworks, and other services with the city of Deux-Montagnes.

It was formerly known as a rural town in which most of its inhabitants were seasonal vacationers, but it is increasingly lived in year-round.

== History ==
On 27 April 2019, there was a flooding that forced more than 6000 people to be evacuated.

== Demographics ==
In the 2021 Census of Population conducted by Statistics Canada, Sainte-Marthe-sur-le-Lac had a population of 19,797 living in 7,503 of its 7,642 total private dwellings, a change of 9.5% from its 2016 population of 18,074. With a land area of 8.73 km^{2} (3.37 sq mi), it had a population density of 2,267.7/km^{2} (5,873.3/sq mi) in 2021.

Population trend:

- Population in 2021: 19,797 (2016 to 2021 population change: 9.5%)
- Population in 2016: 18,074 (2011 to 2016 population change: 15.2%)
- Population in 2011: 15,689 (2006 to 2011 population change: 38.7%)
- Population in 2006: 11,311 (2001 to 2006 population change: 29.4%)
- Population in 2001: 8,742
- Population in 1996: 8,295
- Population in 1991: 7,410
- Population in 1986: 6,143
- Population in 1981: 5,586
- Population in 1976: 4,726
- Population in 1971: 3.169
- Population in 1966: 1,999
- Population in 1961: 1,411

Mother tongue:

- English as first language: 4.6%
- French as first language: 82.1%
- English and French as first language: 1.4%
- Other as first language: 9.9%

== Education ==
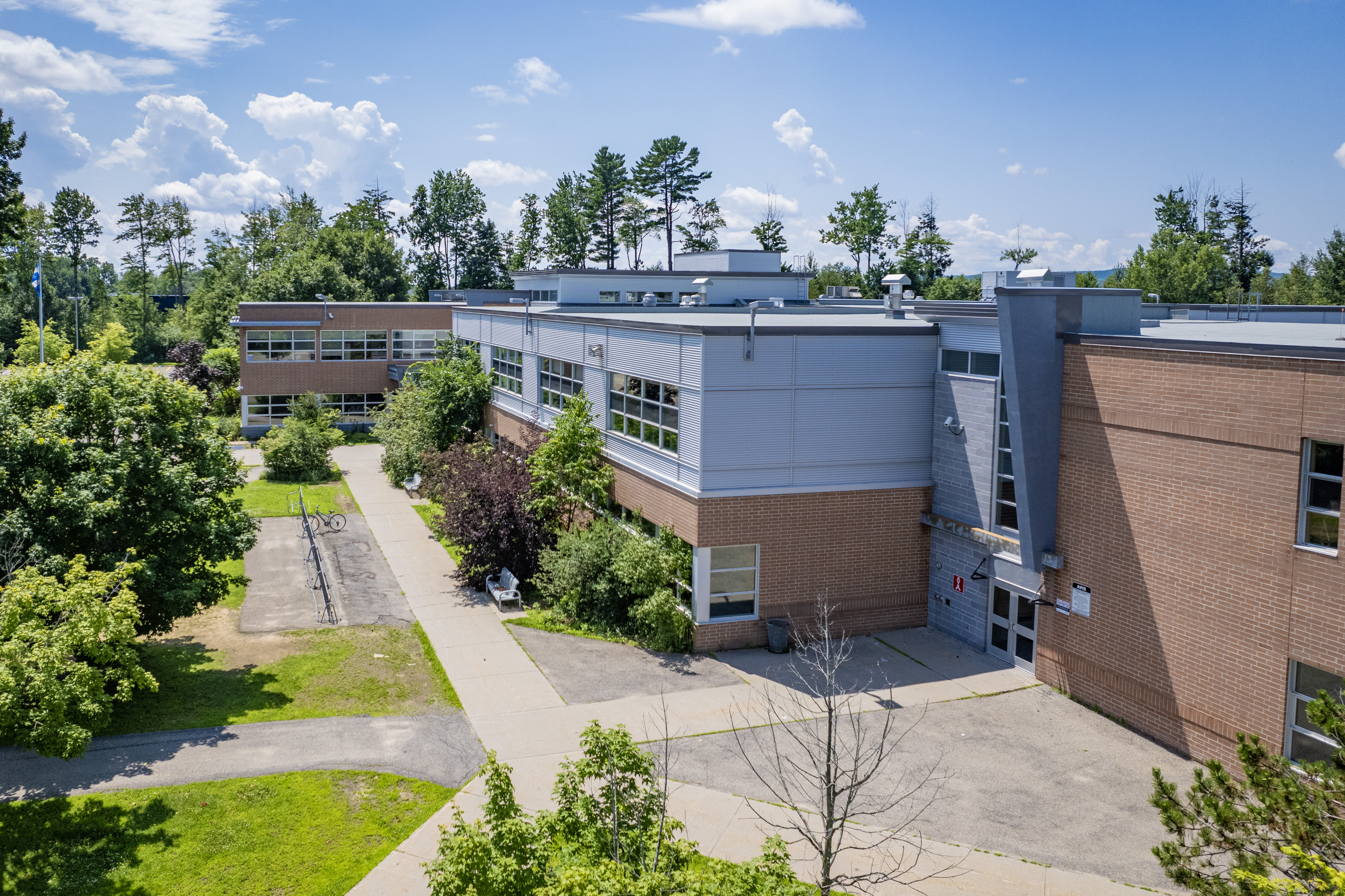
École secondaire Liberté-Jeunesse

The Commission scolaire de la Seigneurie-des-Mille-Îles (CSSMI) operates Francophone schools. This community has three elementary schools (Horizon-du-Lac, Des-Lucioles, and des Grands-Vents) and one alternative lower secondary school (École secondaire Liberté-Jeunesse). École Polyvalente Deux-Montagnes has upper secondary education. Some areas are served by École des Mésanges and Emmanuel-Chénard, both also in Deux-Montagnes, and Polyvalente Deux-Montagnes (for all secondary levels).

Anglophone schools are operated by the Sir Wilfrid Laurier School Board, and the community is served by Lake of Two Mountains High School, in Deux-Montagnes. Mountainview Elementary School and Saint Jude Elementary School, both in Deux-Montagnes, also serve this community.
