= Saint-Placide, Quebec =

Saint-Placide
- Municipality
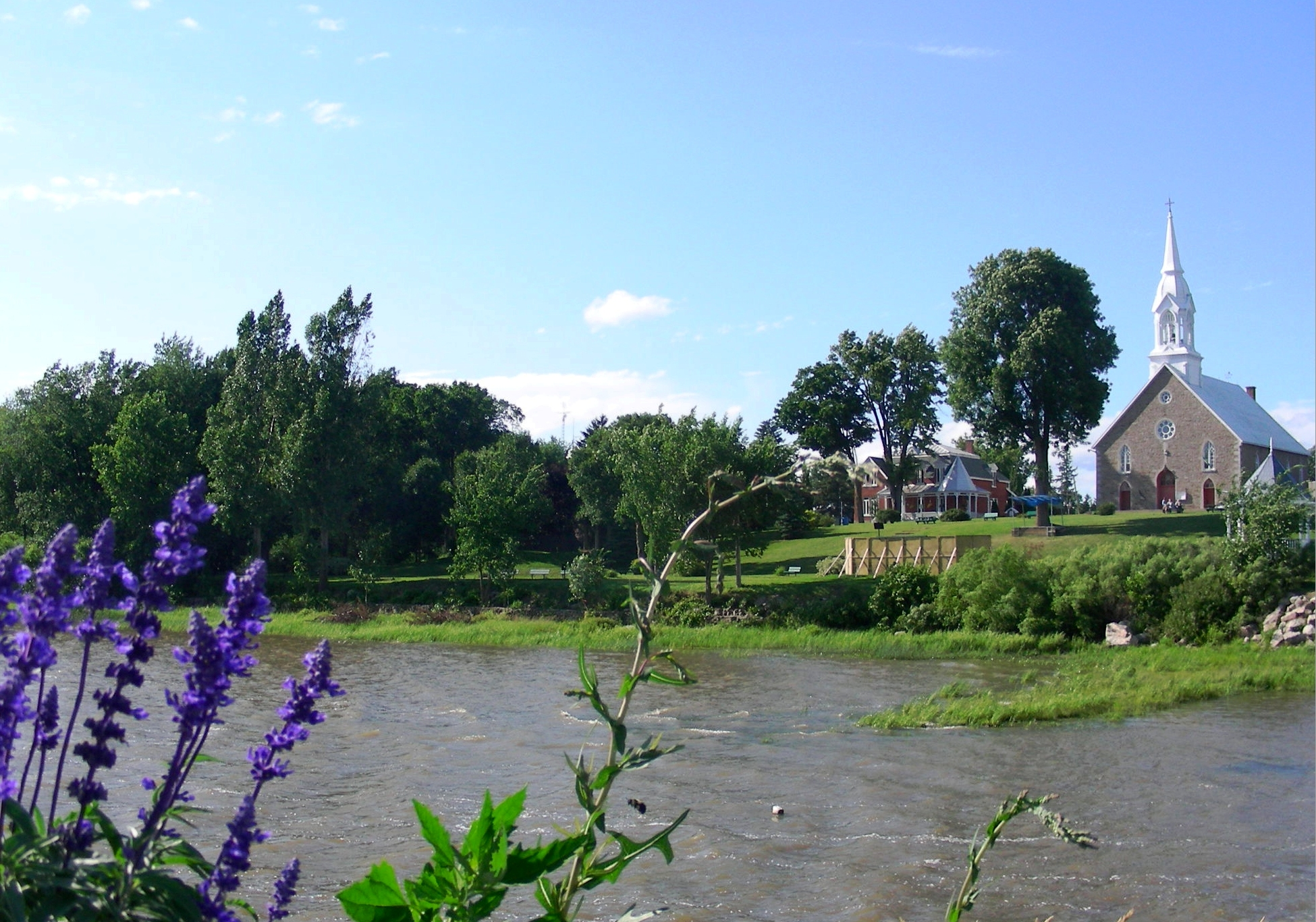
- Saint-Pacide from the docks

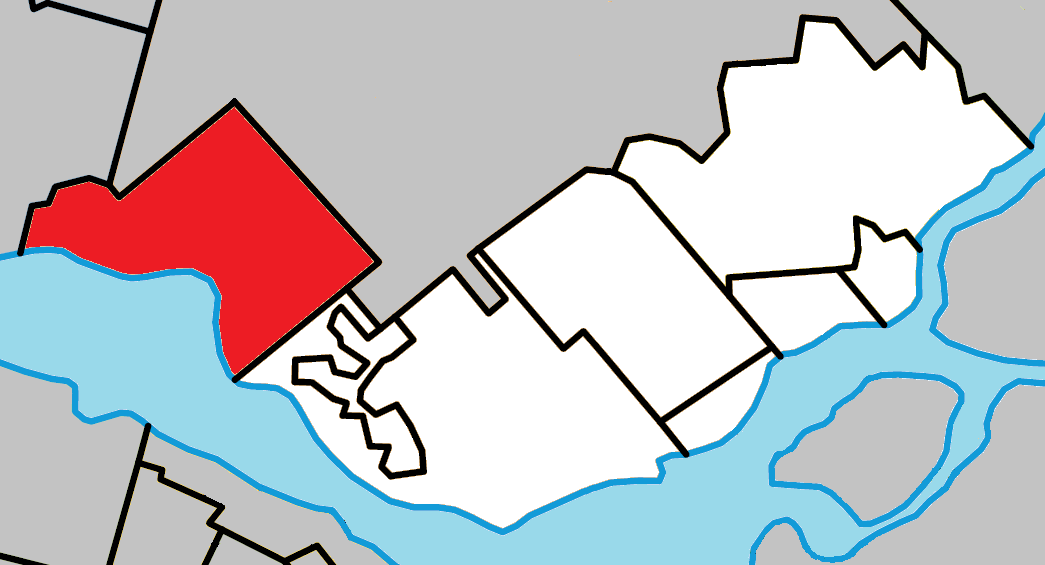
- Location within Deux-Montagnes RCM.

- Location in central Quebec.
- Coordinates: 45°32′N 74°12′W
- Country: Canada
- Province: Quebec
- Region: Laurentides
- RCM: Deux-Montagnes
- Settled: 1780
- Constituted: August 3, 1994

Government
  - Mayor: Daniel Laviolette
  - Federal riding: Argenteuil—Papineau—Mirabel
  - Prov. riding: Mirabel

Area
  - Total: 62.10 km^{2} (23.98 sq mi)
  - Land: 42.89 km^{2} (16.56 sq mi)

Population (2021)
  - Total: 1,784
  - Density: 41.6/km^{2} (108/sq mi)
  - Pop 2016-2021: ▲5.8%
  - Dwellings: 876
- Time zone: UTC−5 (EST)
  - Summer (DST): UTC−4 (EDT)
- Postal code(s): J0V 2B0
- Area codes: 450 and 579
- Highways: R-344
- Website: www.municipalite.saint-placide.qc.ca

Saint-Placide (French pronunciation: [sɛ̃ plasid]) is a municipality in the Laurentides region of Quebec, Canada, part of the Deux-Montagnes Regional County Municipality, along the north shore of the Ottawa River.

== History ==
In 1780, the first European settlers arrived here. In 1848, the Parish of Saint-Placide was formed when it was separated from the parish of Saint-Benoît. The new parish name was undoubtedly chosen because Saint Placide, a monk of the sixth century, was a disciple of Saint Benedict. In 1853, its post office opened, and in 1855, the Parish Municipality of Saint-Placide was formed.

A wharf, built in 1867, allowed vessels of the Ottawa River Navigation Company to take delivery of wheat at that time in the region.

In 1950, the Village Municipality of Saint-Placide was formed when it separated from the Parish Municipality, and was surrounded by the latter's territory. On August 3, 1994, these municipalities were rejoined again to form the new Municipality of Saint-Placide.

== Demographics ==
Population trend:

- Population in 2021: 1,784 (2016 to 2021 population change: 5.8%)
- Population in 2016: 1,686 (2011 to 2016 population change: 1.7%)
- Population in 2011: 1,715 (2006 to 2011 population change: 4.4%)
- Population in 2006: 1,642 (2001 to 2006 population change: 6.8%)
- Population in 2001: 1,537
- Population in 1996: 1,479

Private dwellings occupied by usual residents: 778 (total dwellings: 876)

Mother tongue:

- English as first language: 2.8%
- French as first language: 94.1%
- English and French as first language: 1.1%
- Other as first language: 1.7%

== Infrastructure ==
Highway 344 passes through Saint-Placide. The Oka Express goes to the Deux-Montagnes station and Terminus Saint-Eustache

== Education ==
The Commission scolaire de la Seigneurie-des-Mille-Îles (CSSMI) operates Francophone public schools.

- École de l'Amitié

École secondaire d'Oka in Oka provides secondary education.

The Sir Wilfrid Laurier School Board operates Anglophone public schools. Mountainview Elementary School and Saint Jude Elementary School, both in Deux-Montagnes, serve this community. Lake of Two Mountains High School is the zoned high school.

== Notable people ==
- Adolphe-Basile Routhier (1839–1920), author of the original French lyrics of the Canadian national anthem
