= Quebec Route 344 =

Highway in Quebec

Route 344

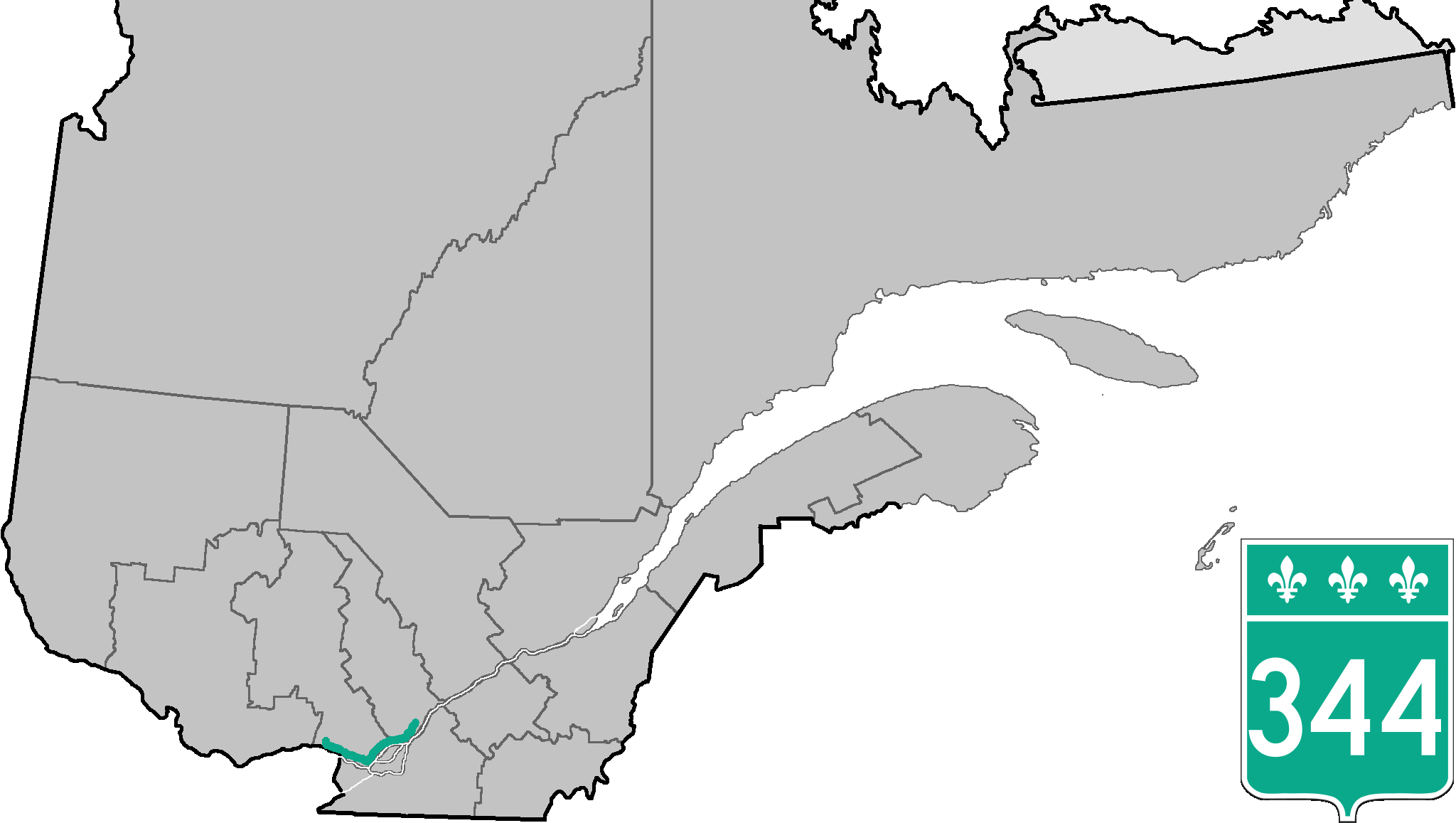

Route information
- Maintained by Transports Québec
- Length: 130.5 km (81.1 mi)

Major junctions
- West end: A-50 in Grenville-sur-la-Rouge
- R-148 in Grenville-sur-le-Rouge; R-327 in Saint-Andre-D'Argenteuil; A-640 in Pointe-Calumet; A-13 / A-15 (TCH) in Boisbriand; R-117 in Rosemère; R-335 in Bois-des-Filion; A-25 / R-125 / R-337 / A-40 in Terrebonne; A-640 in Charlemagne; R-341 in L'Assomption; R-339 in L'Assomption
- East end: R-343 in L'Assomption

Location
- Country: Canada
- Province: Quebec
- Major cities: Oka, Pointe-Calumet, Deux-Montagnes, Saint-Eustache, Boisbriand, Bois-des-Filion, Terrebonne, Charlemagne, Repentigny, L'Assomption

Highway system
- Quebec provincial highways; Autoroutes; List; Former
← R-343	→ R-345

Route 344 is an east/west highway on the north shore of the Ottawa River in Quebec, Canada. Its western terminus is in Grenville-sur-la-Rouge at the junction of Autoroute 50, and its eastern terminus is in L'Assomption at the junction of Route 343. It follows the Ottawa River from Grenville-sur-la-Rouge to Saint-André-d'Argenteuil, where it follows the Lac des Deux Montagnes until Deux-Montagnes, where it follows the Rivière des Mille Îles until Repentigny, where it follows the Rivière l'Assomption until L'Assomption.

== Municipalities along Route 344 ==
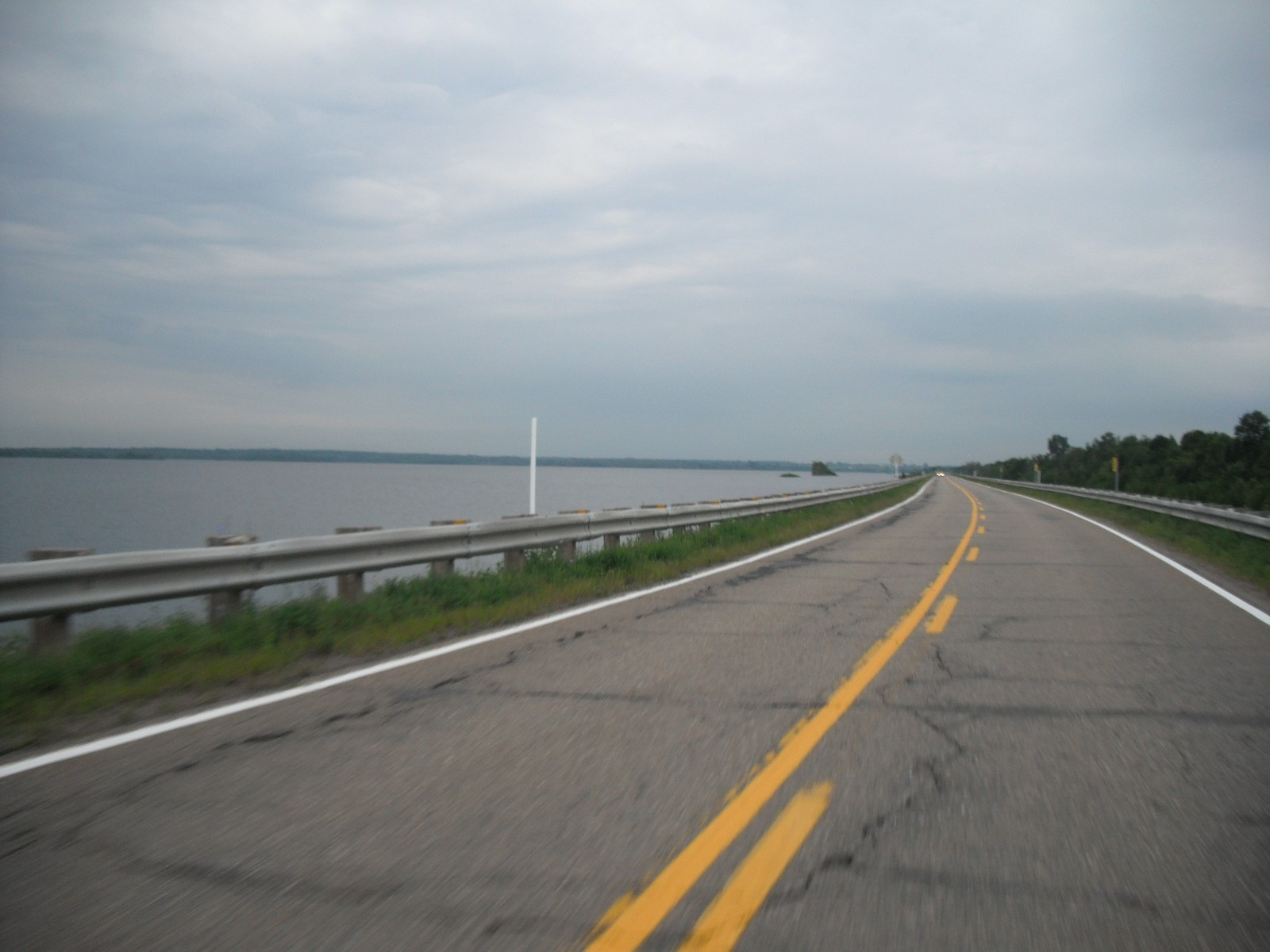
Quebec Route 344 in Saint-André-d'Argenteuil

- Grenville-sur-la-Rouge
- Grenville
- Brownsburg-Chatham
- Saint-André-d'Argenteuil
- Saint-Placide
- Kanesatake
- Oka
- Saint-Joseph-du-Lac
- Pointe-Calumet
- Sainte-Marthe-sur-le-Lac
- Deux-Montagnes
- Saint-Eustache
- Boisbriand
- Rosemère
- Lorraine
- Bois-des-Filion
- Terrebonne
- Charlemagne
- Repentigny (Le Gardeur)
- L'Assomption

== See also ==
- List of Quebec provincial highways
