= École Polyvalente Deux-Montagnes =

Coordinates: 45.5471°N 73.9066°W

École Polyvalente Deux-Montagnes (PDM) is a Francophone secondary school in Deux-Montagnes, Quebec, Canada. It is a part of the Commission scolaire de la Seigneurie-des-Mille-Îles (CSSMI).

With a little over 2,000 students, PDM is one of the largest comprehensive ("polyvalente") high schools in Quebec. PDM offers four academic programs: the international program (PEI), the regular program, the football program, and the specialized program. Polyvalente Deux-Montagnes was founded in 1966 and is well known for its successful basketball, badminton, volleyball, and most notably its football program ("Les Centurions") and his improvisation team ("Les Verts"). During the 1966/67 school year it was also known as Two Mountains Regional High School with English students from as far away as Oka and Laval Ouest. French students were also in the same school during the 1966/67 school year.

PDM serves students from Deux-Montagnes, Pointe-Calumet,Sainte-Marthe-sur-le-lac, and Saint-Eustache.

== Notes ==
- Some material was originally posted in Deux-Montagnes
