= Commission scolaire de la Seigneurie-des-Mille-Îles =

School district in Quebec, Canada

The Commission scolaire de la Seigneurie-des-Mille-Îles (CSSMI) is a former francophone school district in the Canadian province of Quebec. It comprises several primary schools and high schools across municipalities in the Laurentides region. The commission is overseen by a board of elected school trustees.

The headquarters are in Saint-Eustache.

The municipalities of Blainville, Boisbriand, Bois-des-Filion, Deux-Montagnes, Lorraine, Oka, Pointe-Calumet, Rosemère, Sainte-Anne-des-Plaines, Sainte-Marthe-sur-le-Lac, Sainte-Thérèse, Saint-Eustache, Saint-Joseph-du-Lac, Saint-Placide, and Terrebonne Ouest are a part of the school district. In addition, the following portions of Mirabel are served by this board: Saint-Augustin, Saint-Benoît, Sainte-Scholastique and a portion of Domaine-Vert.

== Schools ==
=== Secondary schools ===
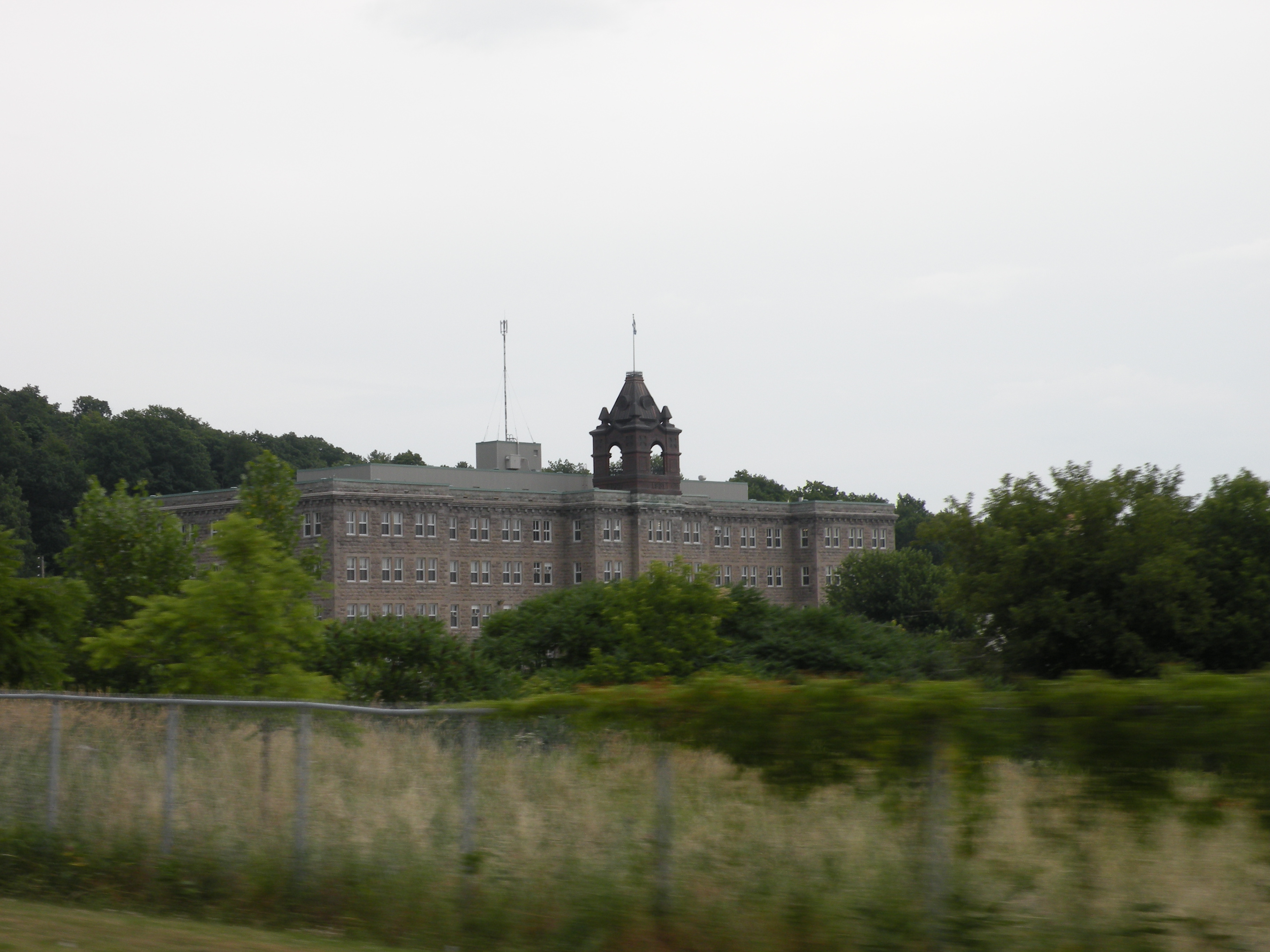
École secondaire d'Oka

- École secondaire des Érables (Deux-Montagnes)
- École Polyvalente Deux-Montagnes (Deux-Montagnes)
- École Polyvalente Sainte-Thérèse (Sainte-Thérèse)
- École secondaire Saint-Gabriel (Sainte-Thérèse)
- École secondaire des Patriotes (Saint-Eustache)
- École secondaire d'Oka (Oka)
- École secondaire du Harfang (Sainte-Anne-des-Plaines)
- École secondaire Henri-Dunant (Blainville)
- École secondaire Hubert-Maisonneuve (Rosemère)
- École secondaire Jean-Jacques-Rousseau (Boisbriand)
- École secondaire Liberté-Jeunesse (Sainte-Marthe-sur-le-Lac)
- École secondaire Lucille-Teasdale (Blainville)
- École secondaire Rive-Nord (Bois-des-Filion)

=== Primary schools ===
- Alpha (Rosemère)
- Arc-en-ciel (Saint-Eustache)
- Arthur-Vaillancourt (Sainte-Thérèse)
- au Coeur-du-Boisé (Saint-Eustache)
- Chante-Bois (Blainville)
- Clair Matin (Saint-Eustache)
- Coeur à coeur, l'Alternative (Saint-Eustache)
- Curé-Paquin (Saint-Eustache)
- de Fontainebleau (Blainville)
- de la Clairière (Boisbriand)
- de la Clé-des-Champs (Mirabel)
- de la Renaissance (Blainville)
- de la Seigneurie (Blainville)
- de l'Amitié (Saint-Placide)
- de l'Aquarelle (Blainville)
- de l'Envolée (Blainville)
- de l'Espace-Couleurs (Terrebonne)
- de l'Harmonie-Jeunesse (Sainte-Anne-des-Plaines)
- des Blés-Dorés (Mirabel)
- des Grands-Chemins (Boisbriand)
- des Grands-Vents (Sainte-Marthe-sur-le-Lac)
- des Lucioles (Sainte-Marthe-sur-le-Lac)
- des Mésanges (Deux-Montagnes)
- des Moissons (Sainte-Anne-des-Plaines)
- des Perséides (Pointe-Calumet)
- des Pins (Oka)
- des Ramilles (Blainville)
- des Semailles (Blainville)
- Du Bois-Joli (Sainte-Anne-des-Plaines)
- du Grand-Pommier (Saint-Joseph-du-Lac)
- du Mai (Boisbriand)
- du Ruisselet (Lorraine)
- du Trait-d'Union (Sainte-Thérèse)
- Emmanuel-Chénard (Deux-Montagnes)
- Gabrielle-Roy (Boisbriand)
- Gaston-Pilon (Boisbriand)
- Girouard (Mirabel)
- Horizon-du-Lac (Sainte-Marthe-sur-le-Lac)
- Horizon-Soleil (Saint-Eustache)
- Jeunes du monde (Terrebonne)
- Le Carrefour (Lorraine)
- Le Roucher (Bois-des-Filion)
- Le Sentier (Boisbriand)
- Le Tandem (Sainte-Thérèse)
- Le Tournesol (Lorraine)
- Marie-Soleil-Tougas (Terrebonne)
- Notre-Dame (Saint-Eustache)
- Notre-Dame-de-l'Assomption (Blainville)
- Plateau Saint-Louis (Blainville)
- Prés fleuris (Mirabel)
- Rose-des-Vents (Saint-Joseph-du-Lac)
- Sainte-Scholastique (Mirabel)
- Saint-Pierre (Sainte-Thérèse)
- Sauvé (Deux-Montagnes)
- Terre des jeunes (Saint-Eustache)
- Terre-Soleil (Sainte-Thérèse)
- Val-des-Ormes (Rosemère)
- Village-des-Jeunes (Saint-Eustache)

== See also ==
- Sir Wilfrid Laurier School Board (area Anglophone school board)
