= École secondaire d'Oka =

Coordinates: 45.4888°N 74.0339°W

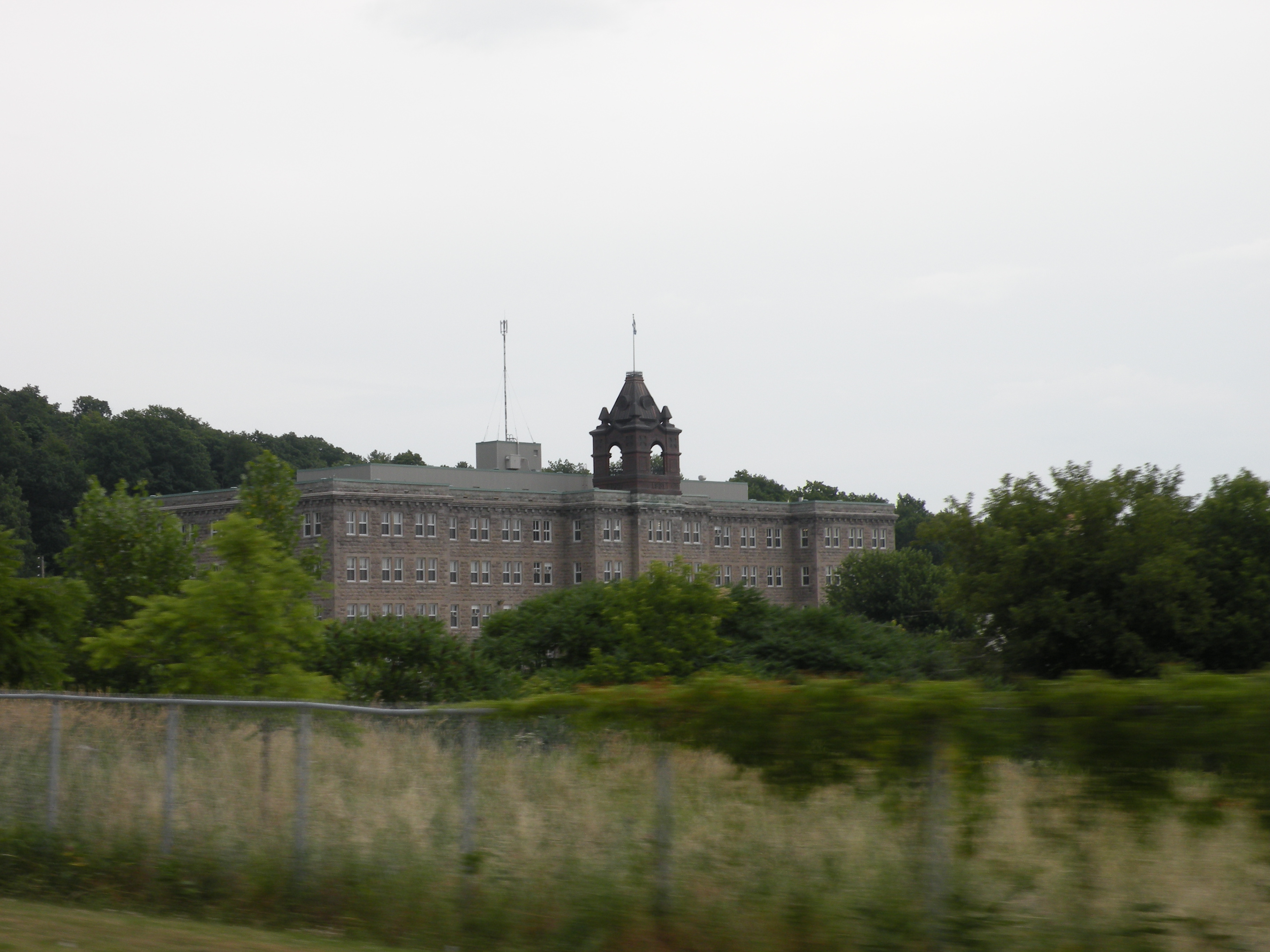
École secondaire d'Oka

École secondaire d'Oka (ESO) is a public Francophone secondary school in Oka, Quebec, operated by the Commission scolaire de la Seigneurie-des-Mille-Îles (CSSMI).

It serves Oka, Kanesatake, Saint-Joseph-du-Lac, Saint-Placide, parts of Mirabel, and parts of Saint-Eustache.
