= Boisbriand =

- City
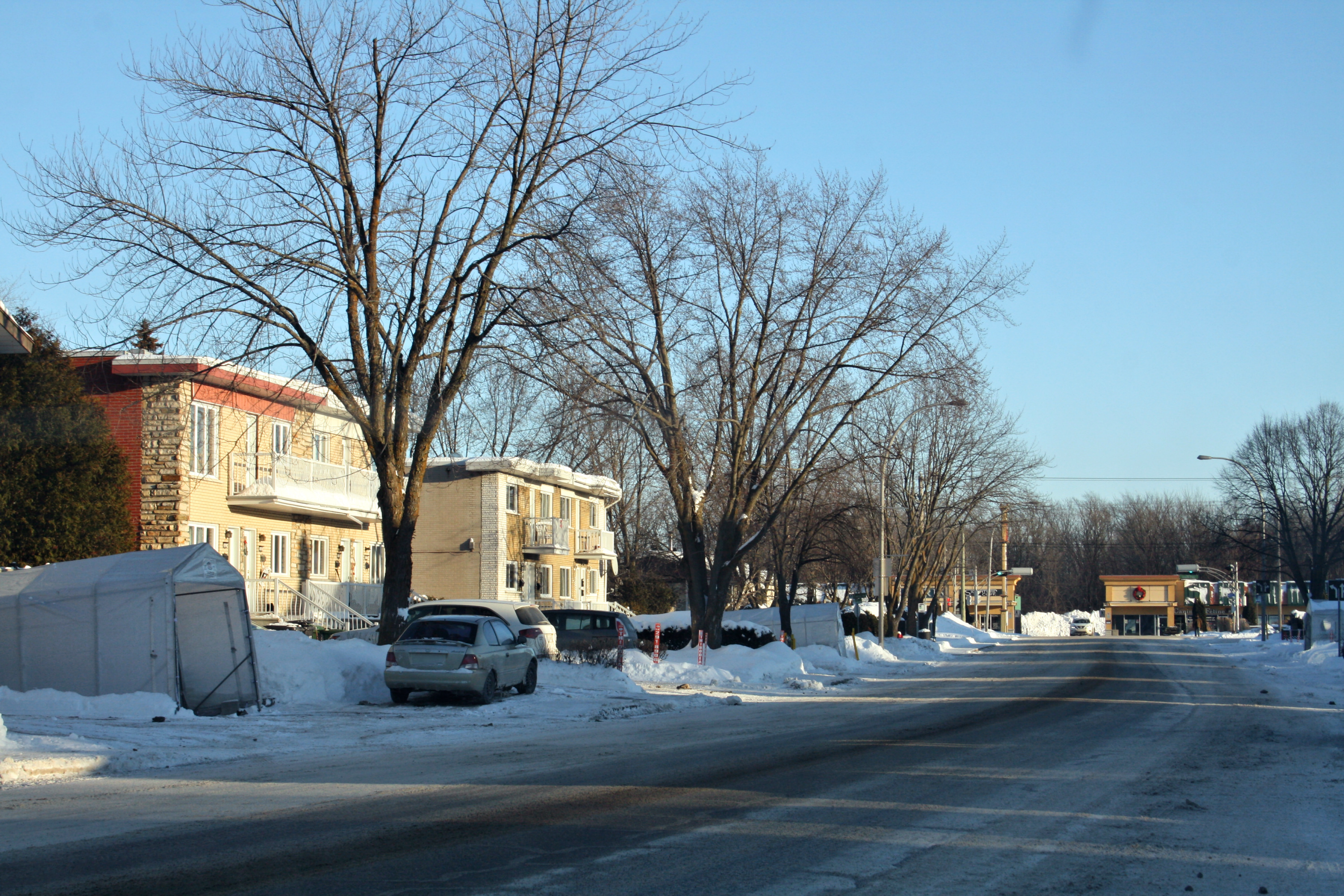

- Flag

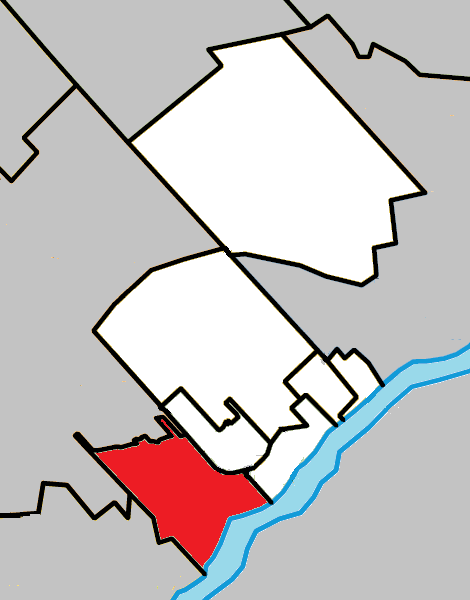
- Location within Thérèse-De Blainville RCM

- Location in southwestern Quebec
- Coordinates: 45°37′12″N 73°49′48″W
- Country: Canada
- Province: Quebec
- Region: Laurentides
- RCM: Thérèse-De Blainville
- Constituted: January 1, 1946

Government
  - Mayor: Christine Beaudette
  - Federal riding: Rivière-des-Mille-Îles
  - Prov. riding: Groulx

Area
  - Total: 29.50 km^{2} (11.39 sq mi)
  - Land: 27.67 km^{2} (10.68 sq mi)

Population (2021)
  - Total: 28,308
  - Density: 1,022.9/km^{2} (2,649/sq mi)
  - Pop 2016–2021: ▲5.3%
- Time zone: UTC– 05:00 (EST)
  - Summer (DST): UTC– 04:00 (EDT)
- Postal code(s): J7G xxx
- Area codes: 450 and 579 and 438
- Highways A-13 A-15 (TCH) A-640: R-344
- Website: www.ville.boisbriand.qc.ca

Boisbriand (French pronunciation: [bwabʁijɑ̃]) is an off-island suburb of Montreal, at the entrance of the Lower-Laurentides in southwestern Quebec, Canada, on the north shore of the Rivière des Mille Îles in the Thérèse-De Blainville Regional County Municipality.

Although relatively small, Boisbriand is bisected by three highways: Highway 13 on the west, Highway 15 on the east, and Highway 640 in the middle/north.

== History and Economy ==
In September 1683, Louis XIV, King of France handed over to the soldier and seigneur Michel-Sidrac Dugué de Boisbriand a vast territory located north of the Rivière des Mille Îles. The territory extended from Terrebonne to the Rivière du Chêne in Saint-Eustache.

In 1740, Marie-Thérèse Dugué de Boisbriand, daughter of Michel-Sidrac, was actively involved in the colonization of the territory. 1740 marked the reception of the first settlers on the seigneury. The brothers Joseph, François and Jean Charbonneau, settled near Grande-Côte, north of Île de Mai.

Around 1750, a seigneurial manor was built by her daughter Suzanne de Langloiserie of Blainville near Grande-Côte, where Highway 15 passes today. This manor has now disappeared. Later, Marie-Anne-Thérèse de Blainville Lamarque (known as Thérèse de Blainville) succeeded her mother and in turn settled in the manor.

The establishment of a first parish in 1789 concretized the colonization efforts and contributed to the acceleration of the settlement of the region. The construction of a church further north (the current site of the church of Sainte-Thérèse) created a new center of attraction. About fifteen years later, the first public roads were built, including Curé-Labelle Boulevard, which was called "the Grand Line" at the time.

It was not until 1845 that a new system of administration was established, providing for the election of administrators (mayor and councilmen) by landowners. The year 1888 marked the advent of electricity in the region and the industrial era began.

On January 1, 1946, the municipality of Sainte-Thérèse-Ouest was founded. It was a detachment of the large parish of Sainte-Thérèse, which originally included the current territories of Saint-Augustin, Saint-Janvier, Sainte-Monique, Sainte-Thérèse, Rosemère, Bois-des-Filion, Lorraine and Blainville. On July 15, 1970, when the population of the municipality numbered 5,600, the Lieutenant Governor of Quebec granted the municipality's request and granted it by letters patent the status of a "city" governed by the Cities and Towns Act under the name of "Sainte-Thérèse-Ouest". The council of this municipality, which had only one ward, was composed of the mayor and six councilmen.

In 1964, General Motors Canada (GM) decided to build its plant in Boisbriand. There were several reasons for this decision: the bearing capacity of the soil, which is made up of solid rock located at shallow depths, the proximity of the new Highway 15 and a main railway line. On October 12, 1965, the inauguration of GM's Quebec plant took place, on the current site of the Faubourg Boisbriand shopping center.

In 1969, the municipality of Sainte-Thérèse-Ouest was required to give up a significant portion of its territory while the Government of Canada expropriated a large tract of land for the development of the Montréal–Mirabel International Airport, which would be designated as Mirabel. As a result, part of Côte-Nord Road and all the territory north of this road, including Côte Sainte-Marianne, was now part of the territory of the City of Mirabel. On March 16, 1974, the name of the town of "Sainte-Thérèse-Ouest" was changed to "Boisbriand" by proclamation signed by the Lieutenant Governor of Quebec. This name change concluded a debate that began in 1969 when the current municipal council tried to change the name of the city to that of Boisbriand but abandoned its project, following vigorous negative representations from two major companies in the city. In 1972, one of the members of the new Council elected in November 1970, J. Maurice Roussel, presented a new resolution, accompanied by arguments carefully prepared and supported by the various local organizations, whose representatives were present in the council chamber. Some members of council suggested that the project be put under consideration, but Councillor Roussel objected vigorously and asked for a vote. Council had no choice but to unanimously adopt the resolution and ask lawyer Claude Ouellette to move forward. Despite numerous pressures from companies including General Motors, the project was successfully completed.

In 1994, the Electoral Representation Commission of Quebec sanctioned the division of the city into electoral districts, of which there will be eight. This division was mandatory since the official population of the city had surpassed 20,000 inhabitants. On August 29, 2002, GM closed its Boisbriand car assembly plant, the only one in Quebec. The opening of the first businesses in the Faubourg Boisbriand. built on the former site of the plant began in 2007. There are several stores (food, decoration and furniture, pet stores, fashion, financial services, personal care and beauty, sports), big box chains (Costco, Staples (operating in Quebec as "Bureau en gros"), Dollarama and Toys "R" Us) as well as several restaurants and bars. The site also houses residential buildings on the west side. At the beginning of 2021, there were 1,250 housing units. An additional 600 units are planned over the next few years.

== Hasidic Jewish community ==
The Hasidic community of Kiryas Tosh is located within the city limits and make up a 10th of its population. The community of about 550 households or about 3,200 people was home to the former Tosher Rebbe, Meshulim Feish (Ferencz) Lowy, who established the community in 1964.

== Demographics ==
Historical populations
Year	Pop.	±%
1981	13,471	—
1986	14,360	+6.6%
1991	21,124	+47.1%
1996	25,227	+19.4%
2001	26,670	+5.7%
2006	26,420	−0.9%
2011	26,816	+1.5%
2016	26,884	+0.3%
2021	28,308	+5.3%

In the 2021 Census of Population conducted by Statistics Canada, Boisbriand had a population of 28,308 living in 11,425 of its 11,769 total private dwellings, a change of 5.3% from its 2016 population of 26,884. With a land area of 27.67 km^{2} (10.68 sq mi), it had a population density of 1,023.1/km^{2} (2,649.7/sq mi) in 2021.

Canada Census Mother Tongue – Boisbriand, Quebec
Census	Total	French			English			French & English			Other		
Year	Responses	Count	Trend	Pop %	Count	Trend	Pop %	Count	Trend	Pop %	Count	Trend	Pop %
2016	26,860	21,285	▼3.9%	79.24%	1,035	▲15.64%	3.85%	260	▲30%	0.96%	3,945	▲17.76%	14.68%
2011	26,816	22,160	▼3.2%	82.65%	895	▲40.9%	3.34%	200	▼21.21%	0.74%	3,350	▲23.38%	12.49%
2006	26,420	22,905	▼2.39%	86.70%	635	▼20.62%	2.4%	165	▲17.85%	0.62%	2,715	▼2.1%	10.27%
2001	26,670	22,960	▲3.2%	86.08%	800	▲6.66%	2.99%	140	▼9.67%	0.53%	2,775	▲49.59%	10.40%
1996	25,227	22,235	n/a	88.30%	750	n/a	2.97%	155	n/a	0.62%	1855	n/a	7.36%

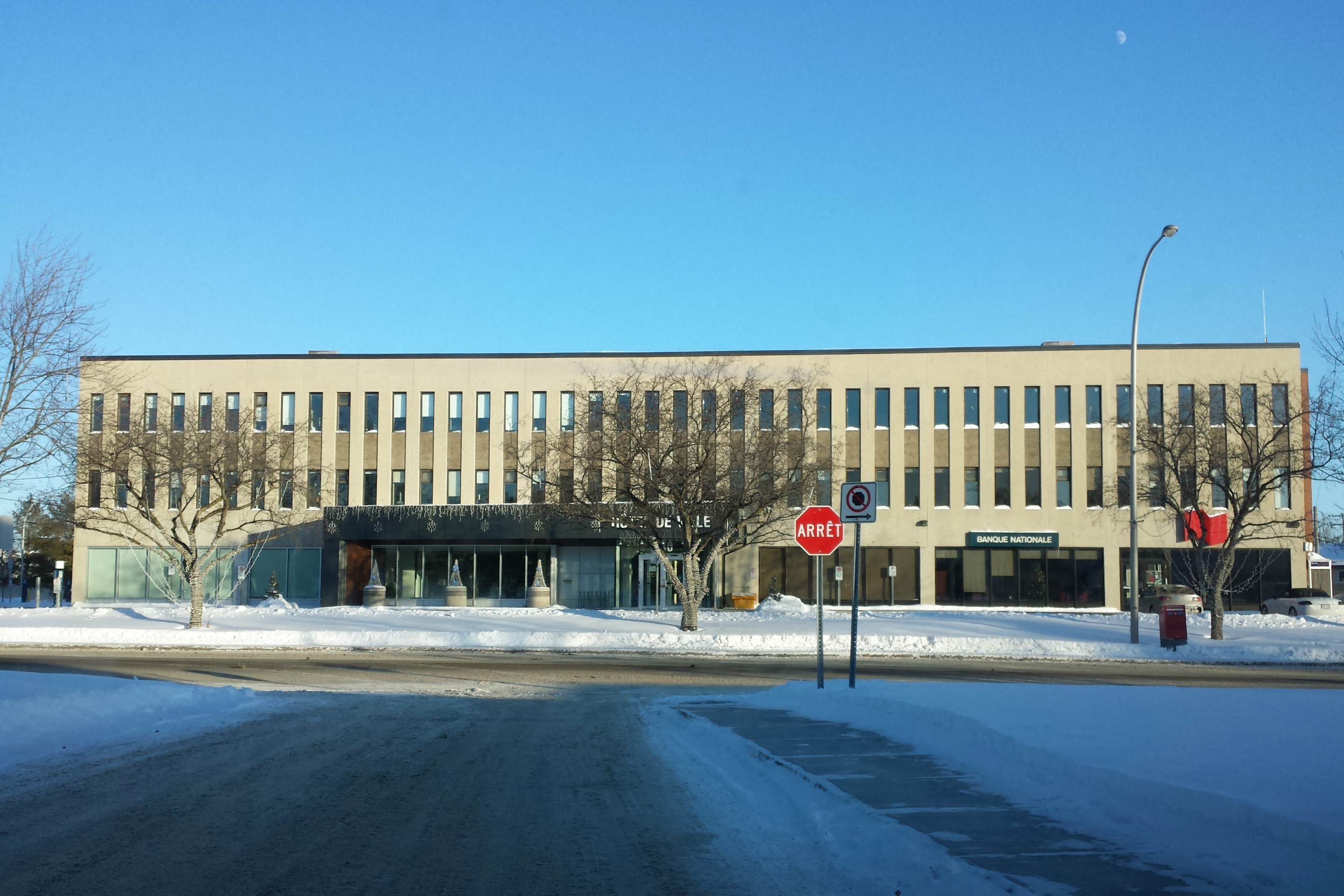
Boisbriand city hall

== Sports ==
Boisbriand is home to the Blainville-Boisbriand Armada of the Quebec Maritimes Junior Hockey League. The Armada play their home games at Centre d'Excellence Sports Rousseau.

The city promotes several sports teams of different categories like minor hockey, aquatic club, athletics club, fencing, karate, synchronized swimming, figure skating.

== Education ==
The Commission scolaire de la Seigneurie-des-Mille-Îles (CSSMI) operates Francophone public schools.

- École secondaire Jean-Jacques-Rousseau
- École de la Clairière
- École des Grands-Chemins
- École du Mai
- École Gabrielle-Roy
- École Gaston-Pilon
- École Le Sentier

Some areas are served by École Le Tandem in Sainte-Thérèse.

Sir Wilfrid Laurier School Board operates Anglophone schools:

- Pierre Elliot Trudeau Elementary School in Blainville
- Rosemère High School in Rosemère

== Climate ==
The climate of Boisbriand is a humid continental climate. Winters are cold with a lot of snowfall and summers are hot and humid. There are four seasons (spring, summer, autumn and winter).

== Twin cities ==
- France, Annemasse
