= Oka, Quebec =

Oka
- Municipality
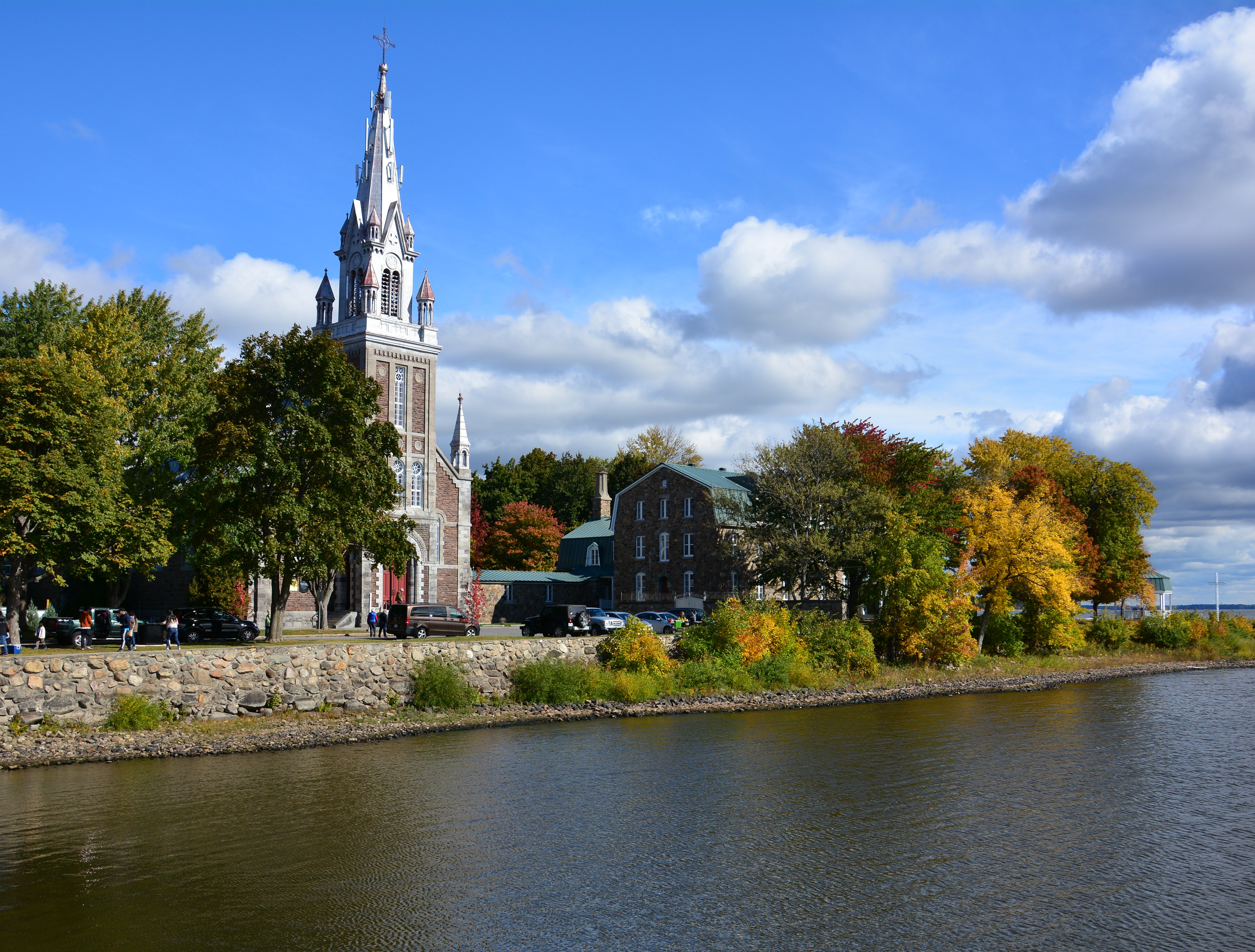
- Annunciation of the Blessed Virgin Mary Church

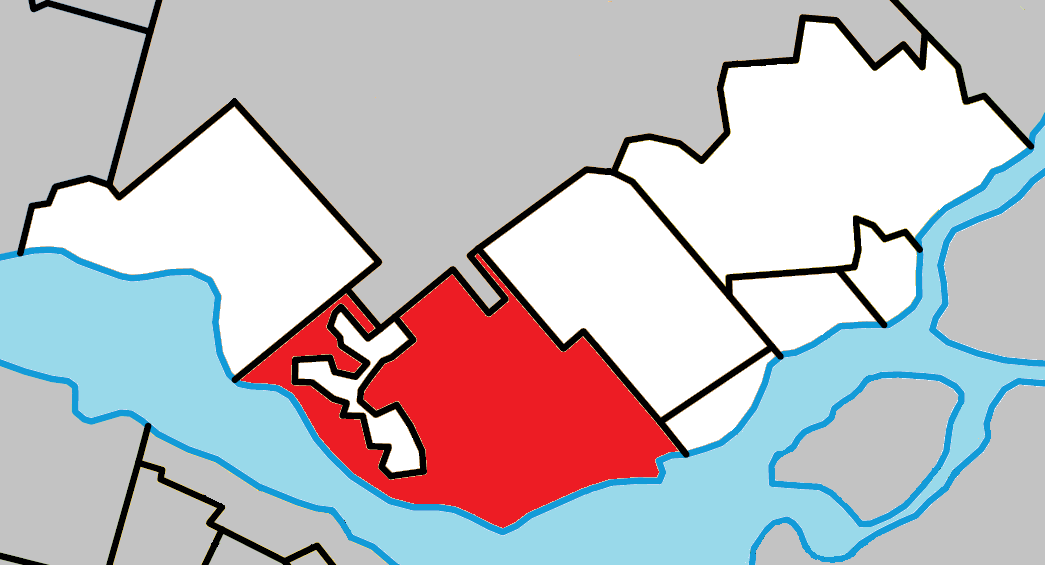
- Location within Deux-Montagnes RCM

- Location in central Quebec
- Coordinates: 45°28′N 74°05′W
- Country: Canada
- Province: Quebec
- Region: Laurentides
- RCM: Deux-Montagnes
- Settled: 1721
- Constituted: September 8, 1999

Government
  - Mayor: Patrick Hardy
  - Fed. riding: Mirabel
  - Prov. riding: Mirabel

Area
  - Municipality: 84.53 km^{2} (32.64 sq mi)
  - Land: 56.99 km^{2} (22.00 sq mi)
  - Urban: 1.00 km^{2} (0.39 sq mi)

Population (2021)
  - Municipality: 3,968
  - Density: 69.6/km^{2} (180/sq mi)
  - Urban: 1,299
  - Urban density: 1,301.6/km^{2} (3,371/sq mi)
  - Change 2016-21: ▲3.8%
  - Dwellings: 1,683
- Time zone: UTC−5 (EST)
  - Summer (DST): UTC−4 (EDT)
- Postal code(s): J0N 1E0
- Area codes: 450 and 579
- Highways: R-344
- Website: www.municipalite.oka.qc.ca

Oka is a small village on the northern bank of the Ottawa River (Rivière des Outaouais in French), northwest of Montreal, Quebec, Canada. Located in the Laurentians valley on Lake of Two Mountains, where the Ottawa has its confluence with the St. Lawrence River, the town is connected via Quebec Route 344. It is located 50 kilometres (31 mi) west of Montreal.

The area was first established in 1721 by Roman Catholic Sulpician Fathers as a mission to serve the needs of Mohawk, Algonquin and Nipissing converts as well as of French settlers. In 1730, the mission site was moved about 1.5 kilometres (0.93 mi) west along the shore to Pointe d'Oka (Oka's Point) close to where the first stone church was built in 1733, and around which church evolved the village that eventually became known as Oka. The Mohawks had been assigned to a west-side village that eventually became known as Kanesatake, but the Algonquins and the Nipissings had been assigned to an adjacent east-side village. Kanesatake's status is as interim land base within the meaning of the Constitution Act, 1867, not as Indian reserve within the meaning of the Indian Act.

== History ==
=== Pre-crisis habitation ===
Oka is historically connected to the Sulpicians's first two Amerindian missions on Montreal island; the initial mission of La Montagne was established in 1676 before moving to Sault-au-Récollet in 1696. This culminated in the King of France in 1718 granting the Sulpicians a concession named seigneurie du Lac-des-Deux-Montagnes with the view to relocating the Sault-au-Récollet Amerindian converts to new mission facilities located east of the Ottawa River at the confluence with Lac-des-Deux-Montagnes.

The move from the Sault-au-Récollet mission to the Lac-des-Deux-Montagnes mission started in 1721 and was completed the next year. The Sulpicians' seigneurie du Lac-des-Deux-Montagnes was conditional on the Indians not abandoning the lands, failing which they would revert to the Crown, and was subject to the Sulpicians being indemnified by being given proprietorship of the land because of the need to construct a fort. Final concession was given in 1718. In 1721, under the direction of the Sulpician Maurice Quéré de Tréguron, Algonquin and Iroquois groups relocated on the north shore of Lac-des-Deux-Montagnes and on the east shore of the Ottawa River.

The chosen site was advantageous for the conversion of the Indians and for their defense and that of the colony. To prepare their installation, the Sulpician M. Robert-Michel Gay, who was the mission Lac des Deux-Montagnes' first superior, made some clearing and built various buildings including a chapel, the missionary's house, a school intended for the Sisters of the Congregation Notre-Dame as well as cabins for the Indians. The Indian population increased considerably around 1727 when the Nipissings and the Algonquins of the Île-aux-Tourtes mission also came to the Lac-des-Deux-Montagnes mission site with their missionary Pierre-Élie Déperet.

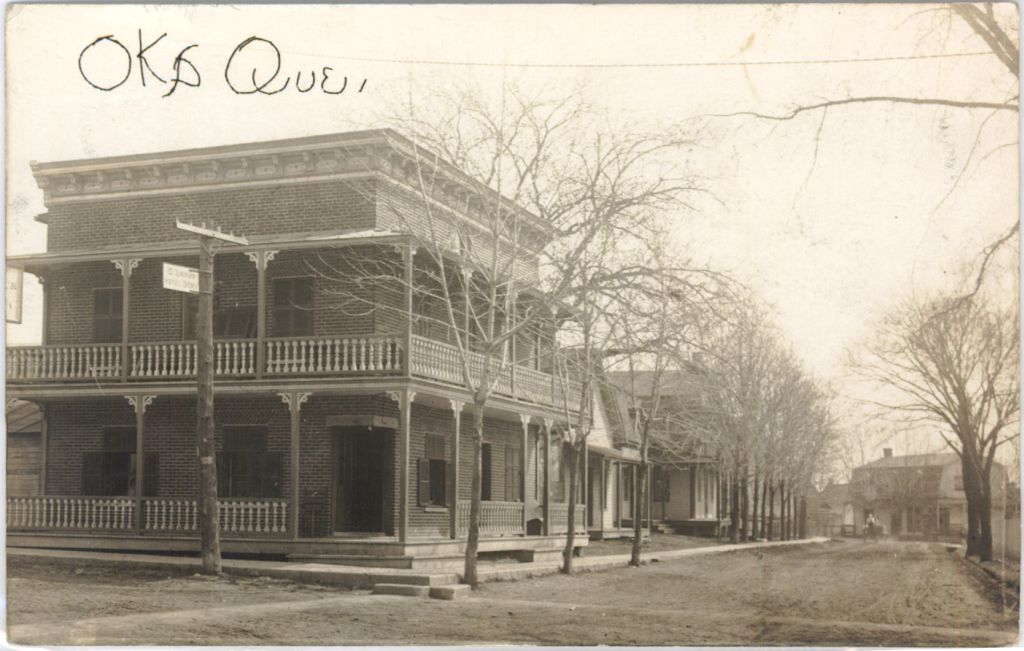
Oka, circa 1910

Between 1740 and 1742, seven oratories were established which are witness to the famous Calvary of Oka, work of the Sulpicians Hamon Guen and François Picquet. Francois dit Belleville (who arrived in Nouvelle-France in 1754) was the author of the bas-relief of the chapels of this pilgrimage site, which is the oldest in America. The missionary Louis-Urgel Lafontaine (1895–1930) was the last to preach in Iroquois [language] at the location. The Calvary was built by the Indians and only for them in order to evangelize them.

The church, the presbytery and the outbuildings of Oka were set on fire on 15 June 1877.

The present church was built between 1878 and 1883 according to the plans of the architects Perrault and Mesnard.

=== Oka crisis ===
In 1990, the small community gained international attention in what became known as the Oka Crisis. It had approved development of a private golf course, to add nine holes and nearby luxury housing. The Mohawk of Kanesatake opposed this.

Several years before the crisis the Mohawks had initiated and lost a land claim court case in which they tried to gain control of what they termed "historic land", land known from the early mission settlement as commons land, which including pasture land, "The Pines" forested land and a nearby aboriginal cemetery. The most recent claim had been in part rejected by the Federal courts. The Mohawks of Kanesatake initial response to the golf course development decision was to blockade a dirt road leading to "The Pines" land.

The conflict escalated from there with the Sûreté du Québec enforcing on July 11 a Provincial injunction to dismantle this first barricade, which resulted in shots being fired on both sides, one SQ officer being killed, the SQ abandoning several of their vehicles and the Mohawk Warriors erecting a new barricade this time across Route 344, the main road access to Oka and Kanesatake.

By the end of July, there were at least 1,000 people assembled in Oka's Paul-Sauvé Provincial Park in support for the Mohawks. Among them were delegations represented by Cree, Innus, Hurons-Wendats, Algonquins, Ojibwes, Micmacs and other Canadian First Nations people.

During the confrontation lasting 78 days, the Quebec Police Force (Sûreté du Quebec) (and later Canadian Army units) confronted members of the Mohawk nation of the adjacent community of Kanesatake. The latter were joined by other Mohawk and First Nations and Native American tribes. In addition, for several weeks, Mohawk at Kahnawake blockaded the approach to the Mercier Bridge, a route that ran through their land. Negotiations finally led to the Mohawk re-opening the road. An SQ officer Corporal Lemay was shot and killed at a period of heightened tensions. Numerous people were arrested. The disputed area was acquired by the Canadian Federal Government as had been planned before the crisis. Development was stopped.

Some in the media reported the Mohawks' opposition being based on the expansion of the golf course over what the Mohawks considered sacred land. This however was never the premise of contention. Instead, the dispute lay over persistent claims dating back to land right issues between the Sulpicians and Mohawks that related not to burial grounds or cemeteries, but to i) what was known as the commons lands including part of "The Pines", and, ii) that commenced at the onset of the British conquest, iii) the Mohawks allegiance to them, and, iv) the definite change of attitude of the Mohawks towards the French.

== Geography ==
Oka is located 50 kilometres (31 mi) west of Montreal, at the confluence of the Ottawa River and the lake of Two Mountains. Its territory covers a total area of 85.90 square kilometres (33.17 sq mi) of which 56.99 square kilometres (22.00 sq mi) is land and 28.91 square kilometres (11.16 sq mi) is water, mainly corresponding to lake of Two Mountains.

The boundaries of the municipality are very complex because it encloses the Mohawk community of Kanesatake, whose reserve is made up of several scattered lands, sometimes isolated from each other, within Oka itself.

The municipality is completely crossed by route 344. From east to west, the road bears the names Chemin d'Oka, Rue Notre-Dame, Rue Saint-Michel and Rang Sainte-Philomène. The Rang de l’Annonciation, which crosses Oka from north to south, leads to the Oka-Hudson crossing. This allows to cross the lake of Two Mountains to reach the town of Hudson and the Vaudreuil-Soulanges peninsula.

The relief is marked by the Oka Hills, which are part of the Monteregian Hills. Rather flat to the south, the center and north of Oka are characterized by hilly terrain. Its minimum altitude is 20 meters (at the lake of Two Mountains) while its maximum altitude reaches 238 meters (at the mount Bleu). The subsoil contains a niobium deposit. The land, for its part, is mainly occupied by large woodlands as well as agriculture.

The Petite Rivière crosses the northeastern tip of the municipality towards the west. The territory is watered by the Serpents River and several other streams (Varin, Girard, Rousse). The Grande Baie marsh constitutes a wetland with ecological value. Around fifteen species of migratory birds in decline stay there.

=== Climate ===
Oka has a humid continental climate (Dfb) with warm, rainy summers and long, cold winters.

Climate data for Oka
Month	Jan	Feb	Mar	Apr	May	Jun	Jul	Aug	Sep	Oct	Nov	Dec	Year
Record high °C (°F)	13 (55)	14 (57)	25.6 (78.1)	30 (86)	32.8 (91.0)	35 (95)	36.1 (97.0)	35.6 (96.1)	32.5 (90.5)	27.8 (82.0)	23.9 (75.0)	16.5 (61.7)	36.1 (97.0)
Mean daily maximum °C (°F)	−6.4 (20.5)	−4.2 (24.4)	1.6 (34.9)	10.3 (50.5)	18.8 (65.8)	23.4 (74.1)	25.9 (78.6)	24.4 (75.9)	19.2 (66.6)	12.2 (54.0)	4.4 (39.9)	−2.9 (26.8)	10.6 (51.1)
Daily mean °C (°F)	−11.3 (11.7)	−9.4 (15.1)	−3.3 (26.1)	5.1 (41.2)	12.7 (54.9)	17.5 (63.5)	20 (68)	18.7 (65.7)	13.7 (56.7)	7.3 (45.1)	0.7 (33.3)	−7.2 (19.0)	5.4 (41.7)
Mean daily minimum °C (°F)	−16.2 (2.8)	−14.6 (5.7)	−8.1 (17.4)	−0.2 (31.6)	6.6 (43.9)	11.6 (52.9)	14.1 (57.4)	12.9 (55.2)	8.1 (46.6)	2.4 (36.3)	−3.1 (26.4)	−11.5 (11.3)	0.2 (32.4)
Record low °C (°F)	−38.3 (−36.9)	−38.3 (−36.9)	−30 (−22)	−16.1 (3.0)	−6.1 (21.0)	−2 (28)	2.2 (36.0)	−0.6 (30.9)	−5 (23)	−10 (14)	−24 (−11)	−34.4 (−29.9)	−38.3 (−36.9)
Average precipitation mm (inches)	91.2 (3.59)	70 (2.8)	79.2 (3.12)	84.8 (3.34)	86.9 (3.42)	99 (3.9)	106.4 (4.19)	103.1 (4.06)	96.5 (3.80)	90 (3.5)	97.3 (3.83)	86 (3.4)	1,090.3 (42.93)
Source: Environment Canada

== Demographics ==
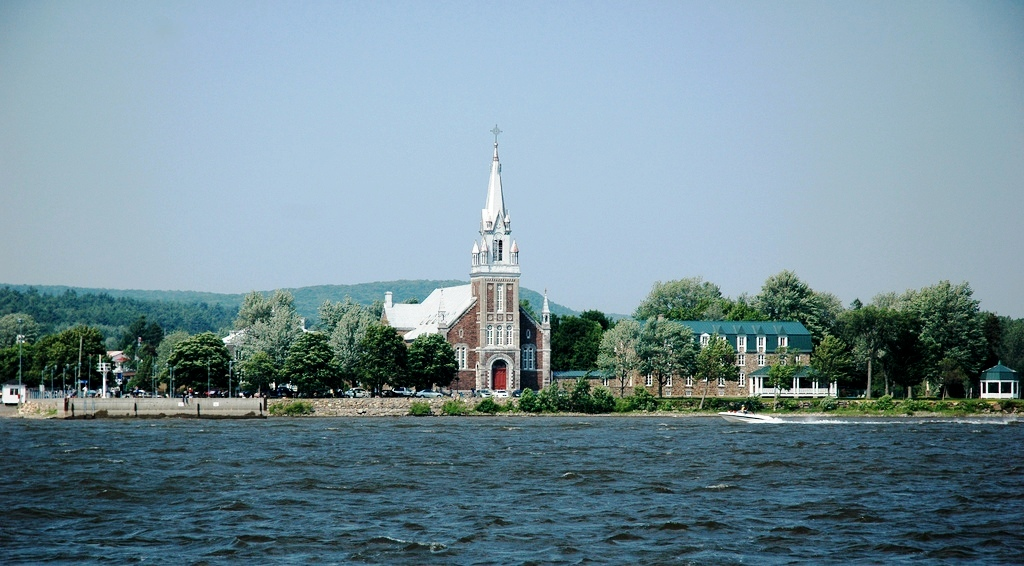
Oka waterfront at Pointe d'Oka

Canada census – Oka community profile

	2021	2016
Population	3,968 (+3.8% from 2016)	3,824 (-3.7% from 2011)
Land area	56.99 km^{2} (22.00 sq mi)	57.31 km^{2} (22.13 sq mi)
Population density	69.6/km^{2} (180/sq mi)	66.7/km^{2} (173/sq mi)
Median age	46.4 (M: 46.0, F: 46.8)	47.5 (M: 48.0, F: 47.0)
Private dwellings	1,683 (total) 1,616 (occupied)	1,636 (total) 1,563 (occupied)
Median household income	$86,000	$71,196

References: 2021 2016

Historical census populations – Oka, Quebec

Year	Pop.	±%
1871		—
1881	1,342	—
1891	1,466	+9.2%
1901	1,571	+7.2%
1911	1,601	+1.9%
1921	1,617	+1.0%
1931	664	−58.9%
1941	825	+24.2%

Year	Pop.	±%
1951	1,110	+34.5%
1956	1,243	+12.0%
1961	1,375	+10.6%
1966	1,369	−0.4%
1971	1,446	+5.6%
1976	1,483	+2.6%
1981	1,541	+3.9%
1986	1,532	−0.6%

Year	Pop.	±%
1991	1,658	+8.2%
1996	1,514	−8.7%
2001	3,194	+111.0%
2006	3,300	+3.3%
2011	3,969	+20.3%
2016	3,824	−3.7%
2021	3,968	+3.8%

Population counts are not adjusted for boundary changes and mergers.
Source: Statistics Canada

Mother tongue (2021):

- French as first language: 90.0%
- English as first language: 5.2%
- English and French as first language: 1.7%
- Other as first language: 2.3%

== Attractions ==
In the summertime, the community's long stretch of beachfront along the Ottawa River and the Lake of Two Mountains, and its marina draw people to the area from Montreal and neighboring cities. Another attraction is the Abbey of Notre-Dame du Lac, famous for its Oka cheese produced by Trappists monks there.

A small ferry service operates between Oka and the town of Hudson across the Ottawa River. During the winter months, a toll ice bridge provides access on this route. On weekdays, there is also connection with the Deux-Montagnes branch of the Réseau express métropolitain at the Deux-Montagnes station via the exo 604 bus route.

== Infrastructure ==
Highway 344 passes through Oka.

== Education ==
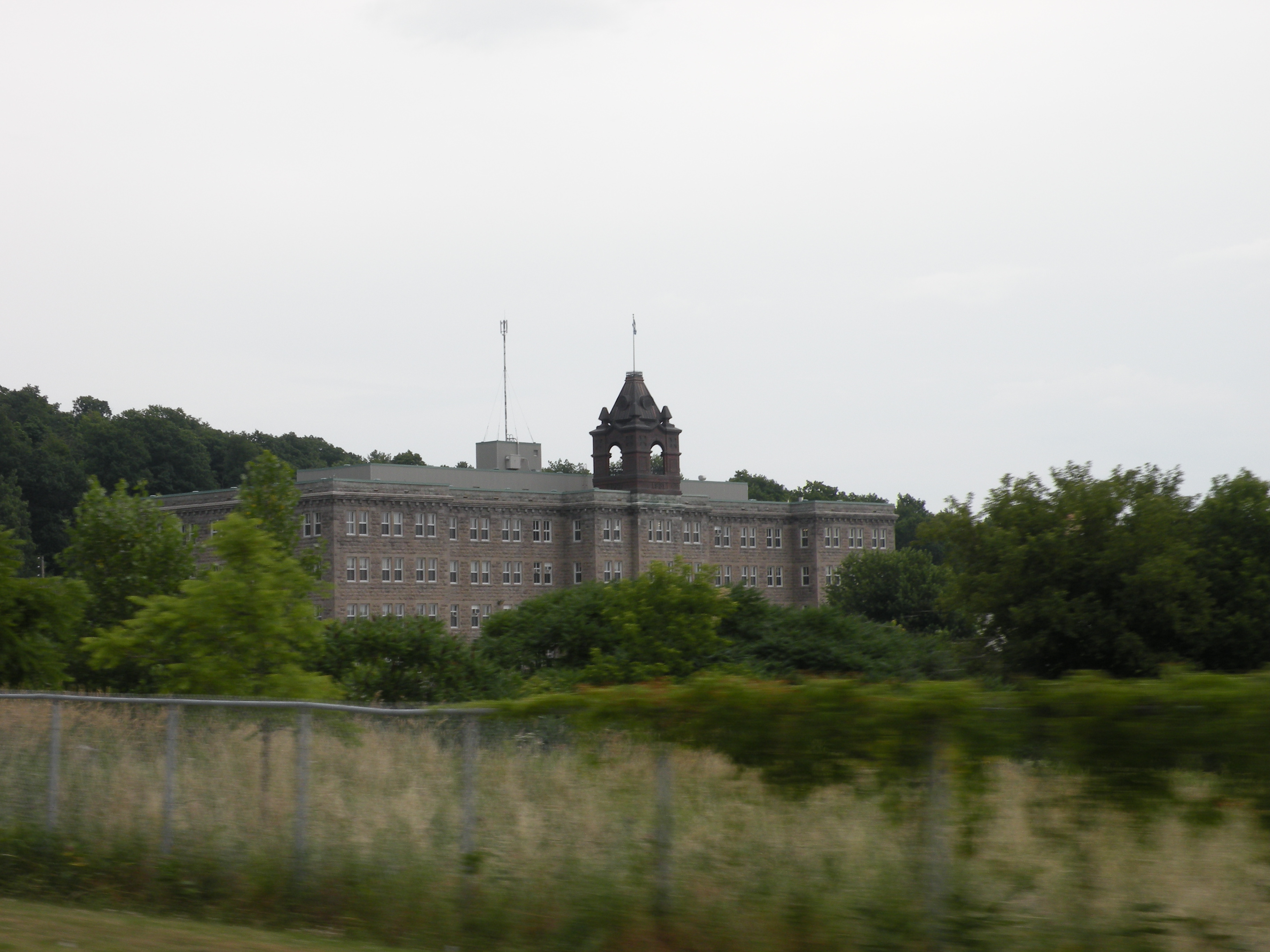
École secondaire d'Oka

The Commission scolaire de la Seigneurie-des-Mille-Îles (CSSMI) operates French language public schools.

Schools include:

- École secondaire d'Oka
- École des Pins

Some portions are instead zoned to École de l'Amitié in Saint-Placide.

The Sir Wilfrid Laurier School Board (SWLSB) operates Anglophone public schools. Mountainview Elementary School and Saint Jude Elementary School, both in Deux-Montagnes, serve this community. Lake of Two Mountains High School in Deux-Montagnes is the zoned high school.
