= Deux-Montagnes, Quebec =

Deux-Montagnes
- City
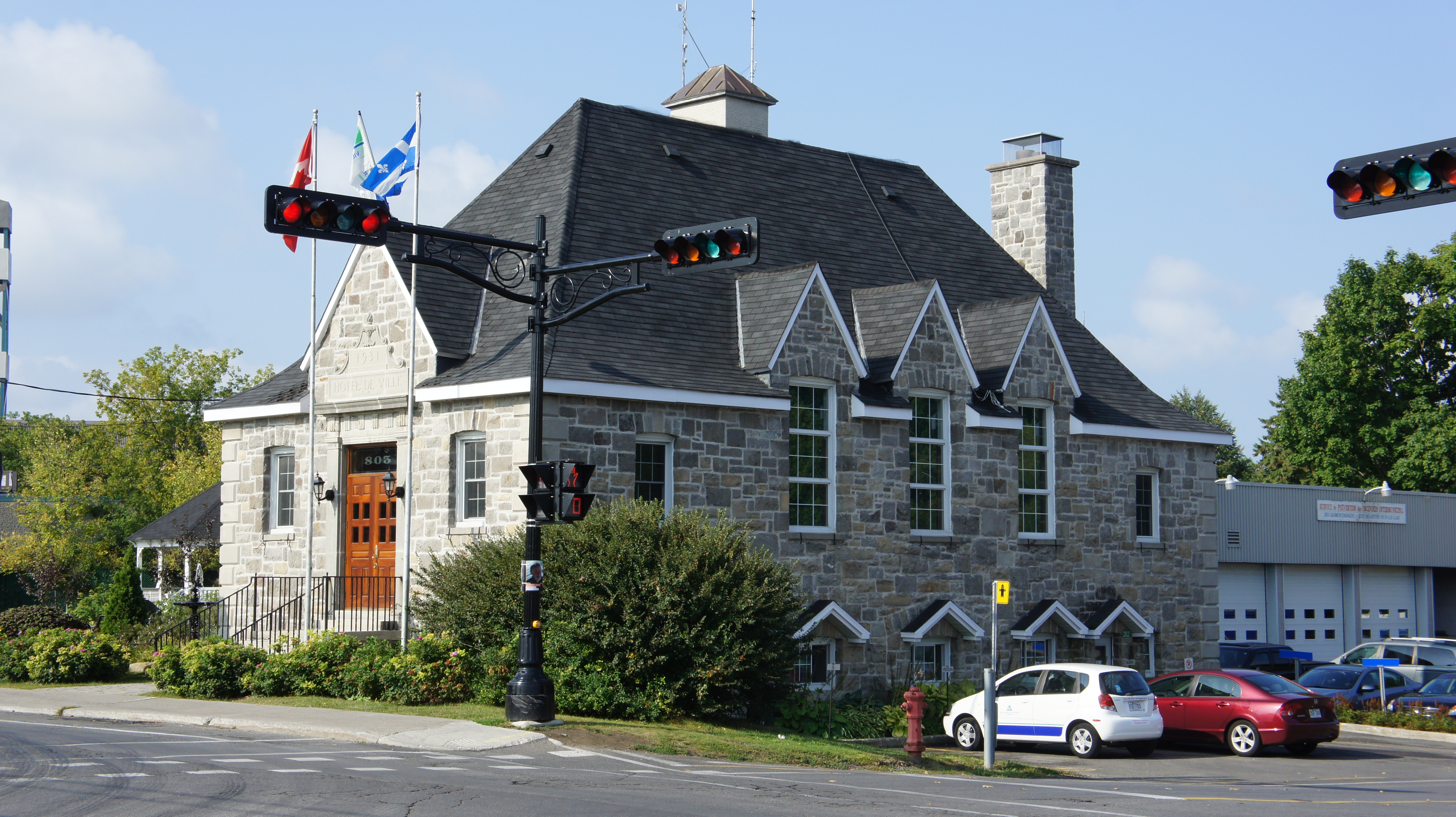
- City hall

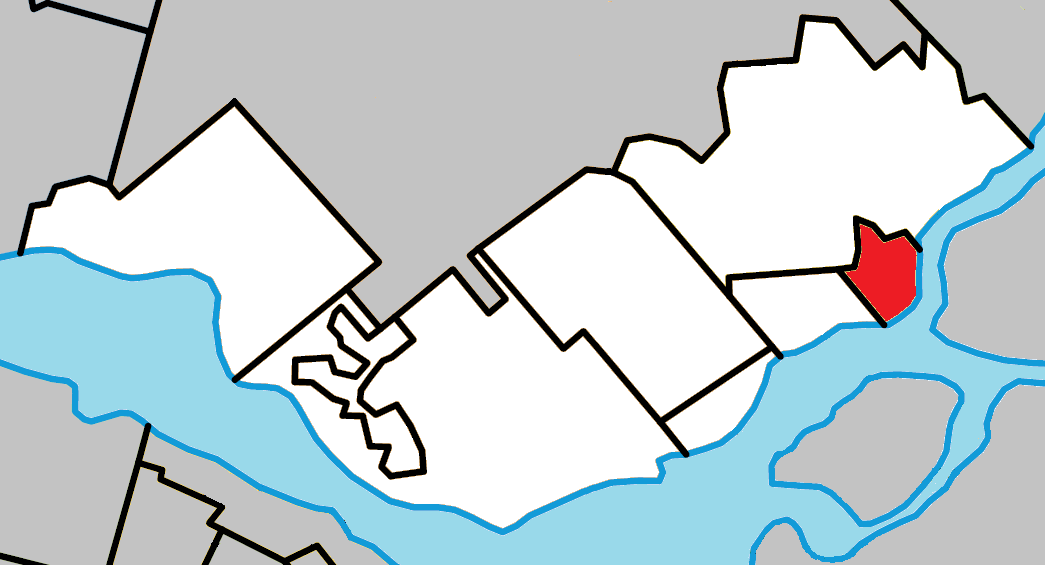
- Location within Deux-Montagnes RCM.

- Location in central Quebec.
- Coordinates: 45°32′N 73°53′W
- Country: Canada
- Province: Quebec
- Region: Laurentides
- RCM: Deux-Montagnes
- Constituted: August 18, 1921

Government
  - Mayor: Denis Martin
  - Federal riding: Rivière-des-Mille-Îles
  - Prov. riding: Deux-Montagnes

Area
  - Total: 7.30 km^{2} (2.82 sq mi)
  - Land: 6.08 km^{2} (2.35 sq mi)

Population (2021)
  - Total: 17,915
  - Density: 2,947.8/km^{2} (7,635/sq mi)
  - Pop 2016-2021: ▲2.4%
  - Dwellings: 7,463
- Time zone: UTC−05:00 (EST)
  - Summer (DST): UTC−04:00 (EDT)
- Postal code(s): J7R
- Area codes: 450 and 579
- Highways A-640: R-344
- Website: www.ville.deux-montagnes.qc.ca

Deux-Montagnes (French pronunciation: [dømɔ̃taɲ]) is a suburban municipality in Southwestern Quebec, Canada on the north shore of the Rivière des Mille Îles where it flows out of Lake of Two Mountains (French: Lac des Deux Montagnes). It is part of the Deux-Montagnes Regional County Municipality in the greater Montreal region. It is located 40 kilometres (25 mi) from Montreal.

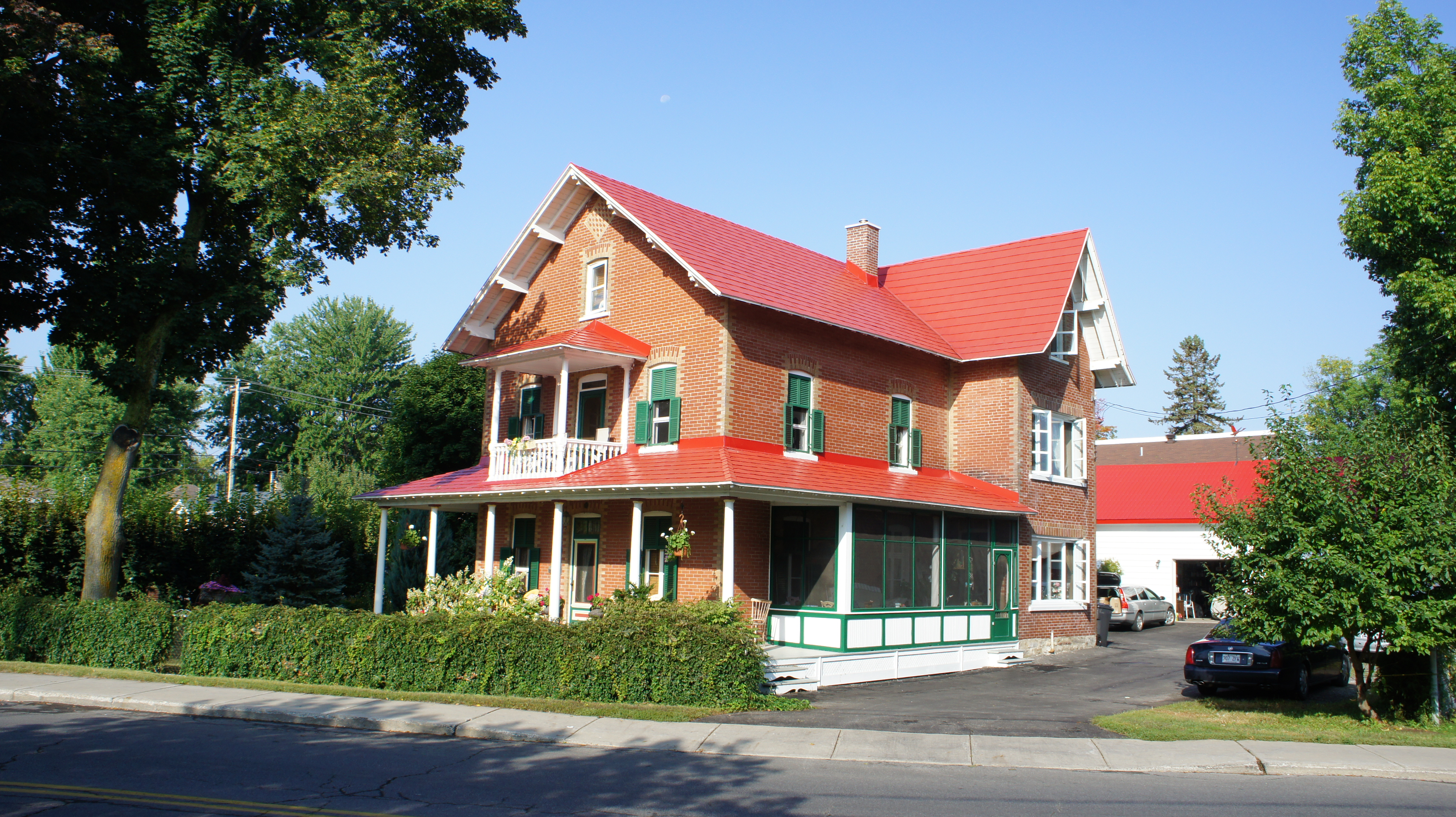
The Maison-Bélair heritage house, built in 1915

The name "Deux-Montagnes" (French for "Two Mountains") dates to 1674 when it was given to the lake bordering on the municipality, and to the seigneury which stood north of the lake. Founded as the Village Municipality of Saint-Eustache-sur-le-Lac in 1921, it became a city in 1958, and changed its name to Deux-Montagnes in 1963.

== History ==
Ten thousand years ago at the end of the pleistocene, the Champlain Sea covered a large part of southern Quebec and left behind the clay, sand and peat soil that is now under the city of Deux-Montagnes. When the sea retreated to the Atlantic Ocean, along the channel that is now the St-Lawrence River and its tributaries, the Rivière-des-Milles-Iles and the Lake of Two-Mountains, southern Quebec became a favourable area for hunting and gathering. (Plante p. 129)

== Demographics ==
In the 2021 Census of Population conducted by Statistics Canada, Deux-Montagnes had a population of 17,915 living in 7,266 of its 7,463 total private dwellings, a change of 2.4% from its 2016 population of 17,496. With a land area of 6.08 km^{2} (2.35 sq mi), it had a population density of 2,946.5/km^{2} (7,631.5/sq mi) in 2021.

Population trend:

- Population in 2021: 17,915 (2016 to 2021 population change: 2.4%)
- Population in 2016: 17,496 (2011 to 2016 population change: -0.3%)
- Population in 2011: 17,552 (2006 to 2011 population change: 0.9%)
- Population in 2006: 17,402 (2001 to 2006 population change: 1.9%)
- Population in 2001: 17,080
- Population in 1996: 15,953
- Population in 1991: 13,035
- Population in 1986: 10,531
- Population in 1981: 9,889
- Population in 1976: 8,957
- Population in 1971: 8,631
- Population in 1966: 8,069
- Population in 1961: 7,274
- Population in 1956: 5,830
- Population in 1951: 3,211
- Population in 1941: 1,472
- Population in 1931: 215

Mother tongue

- French: 73.9%
- English: 12.1%
- Other languages: 9.9%
- English and French: 2.4%

Canada Census Mother Tongue - Deux-Montagnes, Quebec
Census	Total	French			English			French & English			Other		
Year	Responses	Count	Trend	Pop %	Count	Trend	Pop %	Count	Trend	Pop %	Count	Trend	Pop %
2021	17,140	13,210	▲0.49%	77.07%	2,155	▼10.58%	12.57%	425	▲28.78%	2.47%	1,775	▲32.24%	10.35%
2016	17,405	13,145	▼1.20%	75.52%	2,410	▼12.20%	13.84%	330	▲32%	1.89%	1,340	▲28.23%	7.70%
2011	17,460	13,305	▲0.19%	76.20%	2,745	▼10%	15.72%	250	▲35.14%	1.43%	1,045	▲33.97%	5.99%
2006	17,300	13,280	▲2.15%	76.76%	3,050	▼6%	17.63%	185	▼21.27%	1.07%	780	▲51.45%	4.5%
2001	16,995	13,000	▲12.16%	76.49%	3,245	▼8.97%	19.09%	235	▲6.81%	1.38%	515	▲7.28%	3.03%
1996	15,850	11,590	n/a	73.12%	3,565	n/a	22.5%	220	n/a	1.38%	480	n/a	3.03%

== Arts and culture ==
=== Parishes ===
==== Saint-Agapit Parish ====
In 1930 a new chapel was built in response to a request from parishioners of St-Eustache-sur-le-lac, where Monseigneur George Gauthier, Archbishop of Montreal gave permission to replace the small Bélair chapel, that was "located on the Chemin du Grand-Moulin at the foot of De La Chapelle street, on the banks of the Rivière des Mille Îles"(Plante, p. 174). The Parish of Saint-Agapit was officially founded on July 7, 1946. On April 12, 1961 a violent explosion occurred in the basement of the church while 150 children were inside. The children all ran out, and only the chimney remained from this incident. On August 28, 1962 the new Saint-Agapit Church was officially inaugurated after parishioners carried numerous fundraisers to rebuild their church. (Plante p. 174-176)

==== Holy Family Parish ====
Most Reverend Emilien Frenette, who was then Bishop of Saint-Jerome, founded the Holy Family Parish on December 26, 1957. This parish served and continues to serve the English Catholic community of Deux-Montagnes. (Plante p. 178)

==== Christ Church United ====
The history of the United Church of Canada began in the early 1800s. By 1838, the English community of Protestants of St-Eustache built a church where its members attended until 1926. This community attended their first meeting on August 19, 1927, "in the new church built by volunteers on the corner of 8th and Cedar avenues" (Plante p. 179).

The first pastor of the Community Church of the United Church of Canada, Stan Kennedy was welcomed on July 1, 1953. During his charge, he decided to sell the church built in 1927. The new church was built on 14th avenue, across from the original Lake of Two-Mountains High School, on July 30, 1955. (Plante p. 180)

==== People’s Church ====
The Evangelical People’s Church, was built and founded on 5th avenue in April 1964. (Plante p. 181)

==== All Saints Church ====
In 1946 at the "little yellow schoolhouse", a dozen faithful Anglicans met in a classroom and began the history of the Anglican community in Deux-Montagnes. Because of the demand for a bigger space, the congregation moved to a mansion on the corner of 11th avenue and Boulevard du Lac, and renovated and enlarged the premises. The church moved to a bigger location in 1955, on 18th avenue. (Plante p. 182)

== Infrastructure ==
=== Public Library ===
In 1946, when the parish of St-Agapit was established, Father Chartrand, the parish’s first curate donated his selection of books to start a public library. These books were located in the rectory and then moved to the church basement. The books were eventually transferred to the local Club Femina where Annette Magnan offered many services in the St-Eustache-sur-le-lac library until her death in 1975. The books were sold and the Club Femina moved to other premises.

A group of citizens formed a committee in order to create a public library and the city adopted a by-law establishing the Municipal Library of Deux-Montagnes on January 12, 1978. The new books bought by the city council, were moved to the new premises in the community center on March 1, 1978. Internet access was introduced in the library in 1997 to further modernize the premises.

=== Transportation ===
The municipality has two Réseau express métropolitain (REM) stations: Deux-Montagnes and Grand-Moulin. Both stations were formerly commuter train stations on the Deux-Montagnes line and were rebuilt between 2020 and 2025, reopening for REM use on November 17, 2025.

=== Community associations ===
==== The Lions Club ====
The Deux-Montagnes Lions Club is part of the service club organization Lions Club International. The Lions Club International was founded in 1917 by Melvin Jones and today has 1.35 million volunteers in more than 46,000 clubs. Its mission is to "empower volunteers to serve their communities, meet humanitarian needs, encourage peace and promote international understanding through Lions clubs."

==== 4 Korners Family Resource Center ====
The 4 Korners Family Resource Center is a non-profit organization that seeks to provide English resources for children, adults and seniors in the Laurentian region. The services offered by 4 Korners are information, referrals, interpretation, accompaniment and support.

== Sports ==
=== Sport associations ===
- Hockey Association - Deux-Montagnes Panthères
- Soccer Association - Deux-Montagnes Shamrocks
- Deux-Montagnes Softball Association
- Basketball Deux-Montagnes - Founded by Bob Fordham
- Senior Soccer Association - Two Mountains Senior Soccer Club
- Baseball Association - Deux-Montagnes Cardinals
- Centurions Deux-Montagnes - Polyvalente Deux-Montagnes
- ARDM (ringuette Association) - Deux-Montagnes Coyotes

== Education ==
The Commission scolaire de la Seigneurie-des-Mille-Îles (CSSMI) operates Francophone schools. The Sir Wilfrid Laurier School Board (SWLSB) operates Anglophone schools.

The little yellow schoolhouse, located at the corner of 14th avenue and Chemin d’Oka, was the only educational institution during the 1940s. At the time, English and French students were accepted. A teacher earned $300 annually and was provided lodging on the second floor. The school was shut down in the 1960s because of a population increase in the area and the new construction of St-Jude School. (Plante p. 182)

=== English language schools ===
- Lake Of Two Mountains High School (LTM)

The original Lake of Two Mountains High School was at the corner of 14th avenue and Chemin d’Oka where its first class graduated in 1954. A new building was built in 1981 on Guy street and still stands here today.

The Lake of Two Mountains High School serves students from neighbouring towns including Deux-Montagnes, Kanesatake, Mirabel (St-Augustin Sector and St-Benoit sector), Oka, Pointe-Calumet, St-Joseph-du-Lac St-Eustache, St-Placide and St-Marthe-sur-le-lac.

- St. Jude Elementary School

In 1949 Saint-Jude Elementary School was built on Saint-Jude Street, behind the Saint-Agapit Church because the town was experiencing a population boom. In 1953, the school reached its total capacity of students and resulted in the building of the Sauvé School. (Plante p. 183)

- Mountainview Elementary School

Built in the early 1960s on the corner of Guy Street and 20th Avenue, St-Eustache sur-le-Lac Elementary School (as it was originally called) served the English-speaking, non-catholic (i.e.Protestant) community, before the implementation of the non-denominational school board system throughout Quebec. The school still operates today, as Mountainview Elementary, as part of the Sir-Wilfrid-Laurier School Board. (S. Menard, alumni).

=== French language schools ===
==== High school ====
- École Polyvalente Deux-Montagnes (PDM)

==== Elementary schools ====
- École Sauvé

Sauvé Elementary School, opened in 1953, and taught children from grades 1 to 9. In 1957 a second floor was added to the building because of the growing number of children in St-Eustache-sur-le-Lac. In the 1959-60 school year, French primary students were taught on the first floor and English primary students were taught on the second floor. Because of the ongoing population growth, it was decided in 1961 that all French students would attend Sauvé School and all English Students would attend Saint-Jude School. (Plante p. 184)

- École Emmanuel-Chénard
- École des Mésanges

==== Continuing education ====
- Centre de formation professionnelle, l'Émergence

==== Special needs school ====
- École des Érables

== Notable people ==
- Glen Drover - Musician
- Shawn Drover - Musician
- Mikaël Kingsbury - Freestyle Skier
- Fanny Létourneau - Synchronized Swimmer
- Ken McGoogan - Author
- A. Lawrence Vaincourt - Author
- Danièle Sauvageau - Women's Hockey Coach

== See also ==
- List of anglophone communities in Quebec
