= Mirabel, Quebec =

City in Canada

Mirabel
- City
- Ville de Mirabel
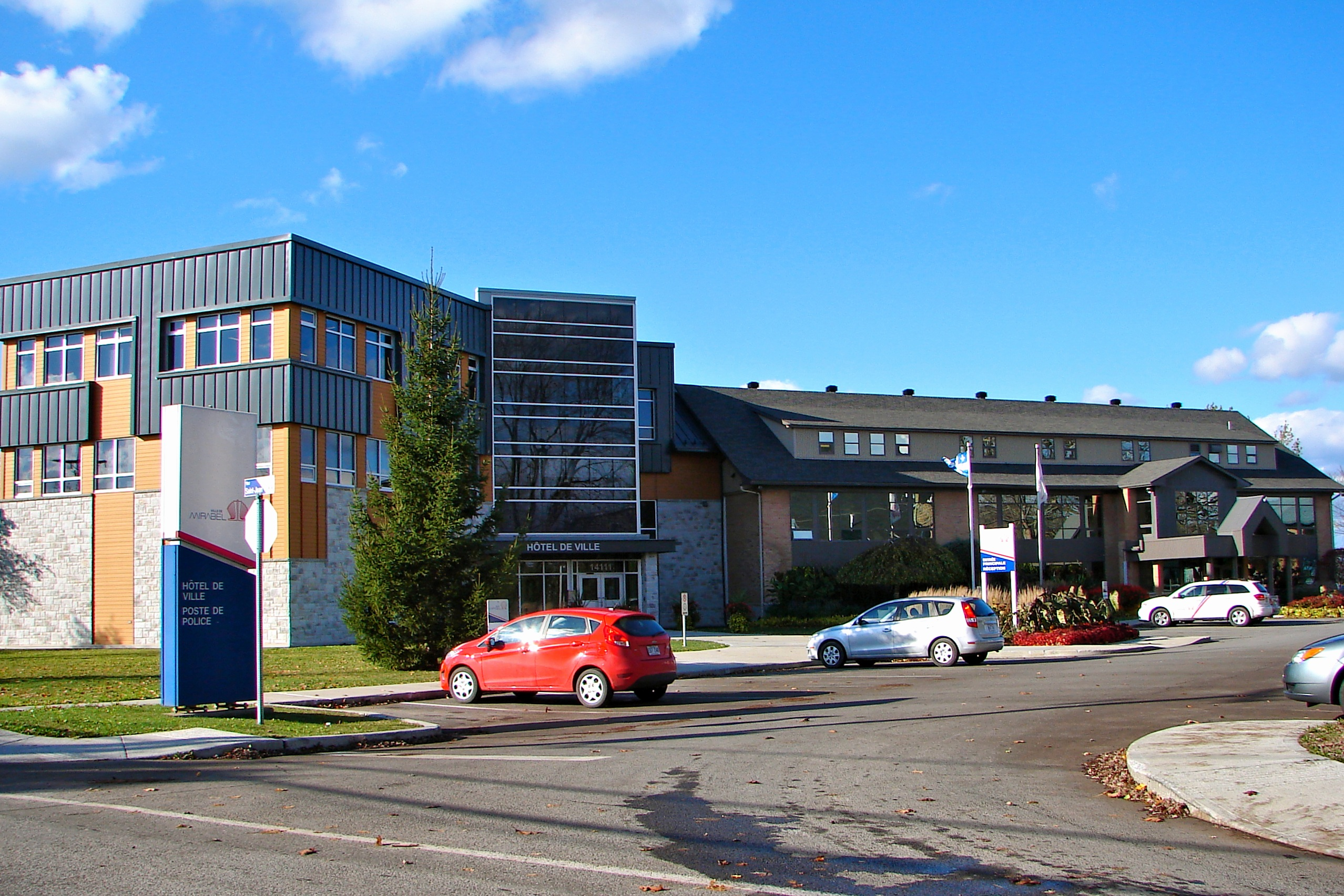
- Mirabel City Hall

- Logo

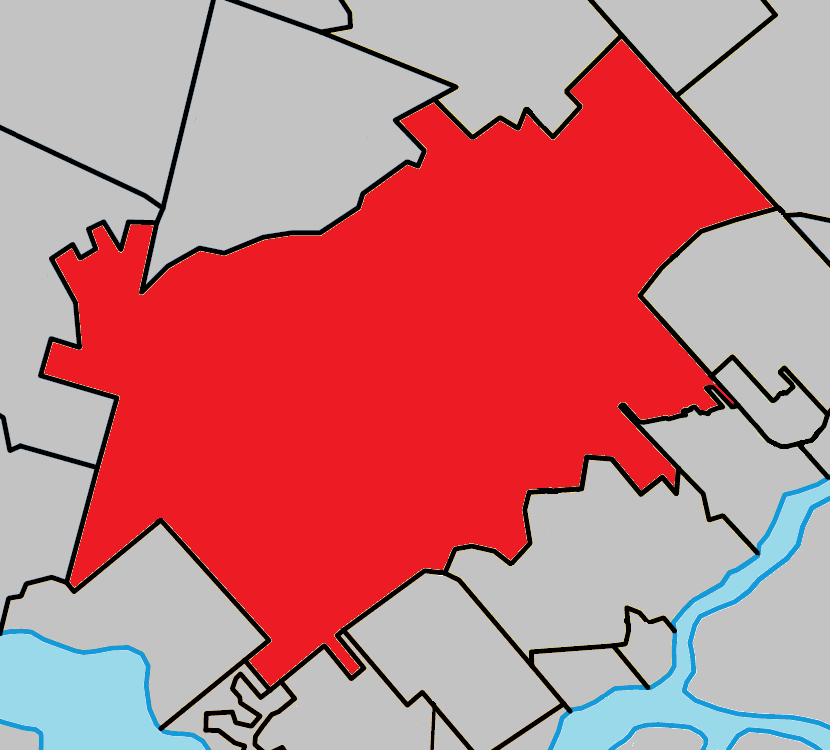
- Location with surrounding municipalities

- Location in central Quebec
- Coordinates: 45°39′49″N 074°00′07″W
- Country: Canada
- Province: Quebec
- Region: Laurentides
- RCM: None
- Constituted: January 1, 1971

Government
  - Mayor: Roxanne Therrien
  - Federal riding: Mirabel
  - Prov. riding: Mirabel

Area
  - City: 486.80 km^{2} (187.95 sq mi)
  - Land: 484.09 km^{2} (186.91 sq mi)
  - Urban: 11.35 km^{2} (4.38 sq mi)

Population (2021)
  - City: 61,108
  - Density: 126.2/km^{2} (327/sq mi)
  - Urban: 11,769
  - Urban density: 1,036.7/km^{2} (2,685/sq mi)
  - Change 2016-2021: ▲21%
  - Dwellings: 25,514
- Time zone: UTC−5 (EST)
  - Summer (DST): UTC−4 (EDT)
- Postal code(s): J7J, J7N
- Area codes: 450 and 579
- Highways A-15 (TCH) A-50 A-13: R-117; R-148; R-158
- Website: ville.mirabel.qc.ca

Mirabel (French pronunciation: [miʁabɛl]) is a suburb of Montreal, located on the North Shore in southern Quebec.

Mirabel is also the name of a territory equivalent to a regional county municipality (TE) and census division (CD) of Quebec, coextensive with the city of Mirabel. Its geographical code is 74. Prior to 2002, Mirabel was not only a city but also comprised the Mirabel Regional County Municipality.

The city is home to Montréal–Mirabel International Airport.

== History ==
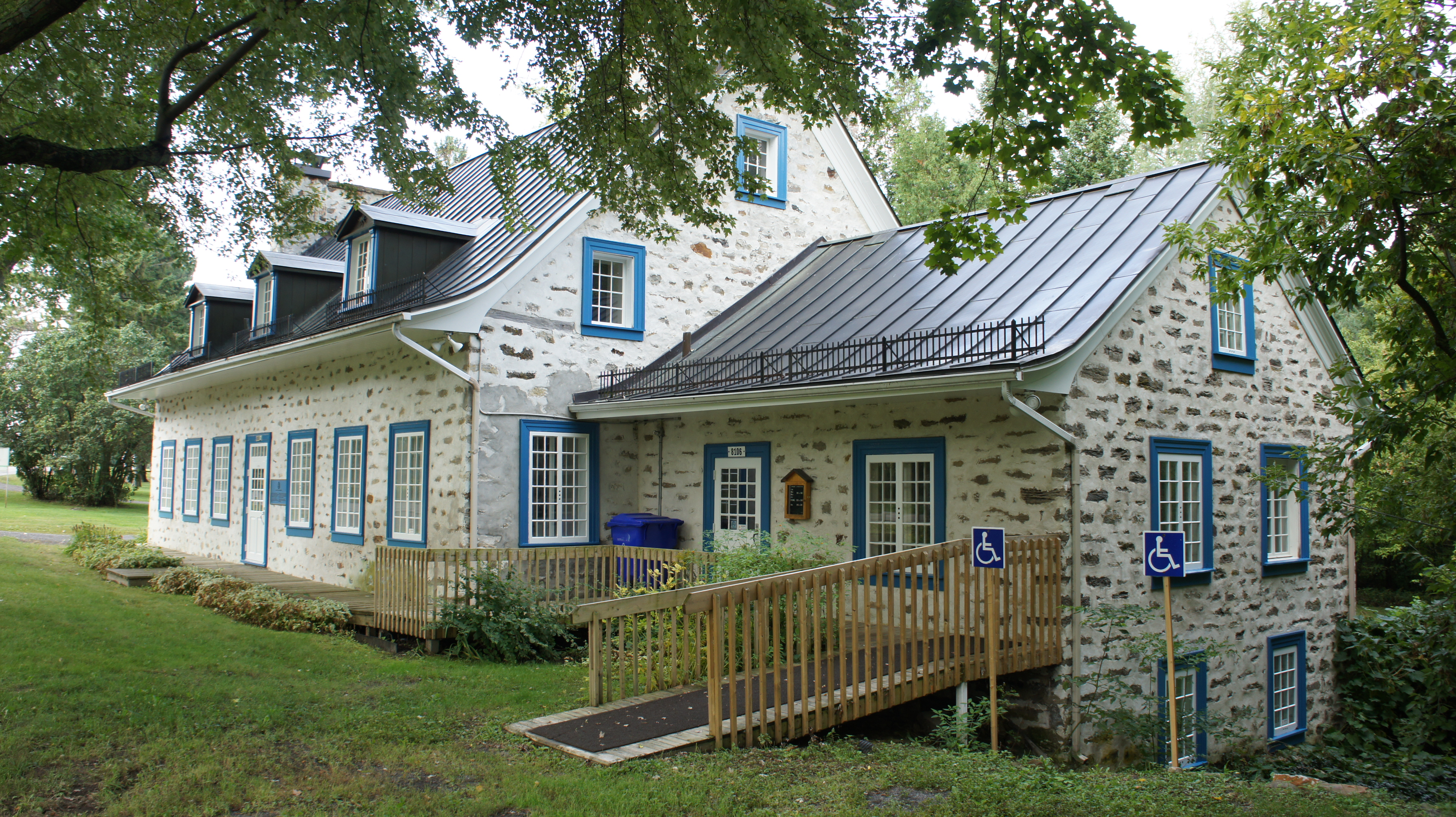
The Belle-Rivière Estate in Sainte-Scholastique, built in 1804

Mirabel was formed through the expropriation of private lands and the merger of eight municipalities in 1971. The former municipalities were (with their individual founding dates in brackets): Saint-Augustin (1855); Saint-Benoît (1855); Saint-Hermas (1855); Saint-Janvier-de-Blainville (1855); Sainte-Scholastique (1855); Saint-Canut (1857); Sainte-Monique (1872), and Saint-Janvier-de-la-Croix (1959). Initially called Ville de Sainte-Scholastique but renamed Mirabel in 1973, the city was planned to become a vast transportation and industrial hub for Eastern Canada, with Montréal–Mirabel International Airport at its centre.

Montréal–Mirabel International Airport, which opened in 1975, never became a major aviation hub and the industrial parks never materialized, and in 2004, the airport closed to all scheduled commercial passenger traffic. It continues to operate as a cargo airport and handles a few charter passenger flights.

In 2000, about 10 km^{2} (3.9 sq mi) of Mirabel's territory was annexed by Lachute.

== Geography ==
=== Communities ===
- Domaine-Vert Nord
- Domaine-Vert Sud
- Mirabel-en-Haut
- Petit St-Charles
- Saint-Antoine-des-Laurentides
- Saint-Augustin
- Saint-Benoît
- Saint-Canut
- Sainte-Monique
- Saint-Hermas
- Saint-Janvier
- Saint-Jérusalem
- Sainte-Scholastique
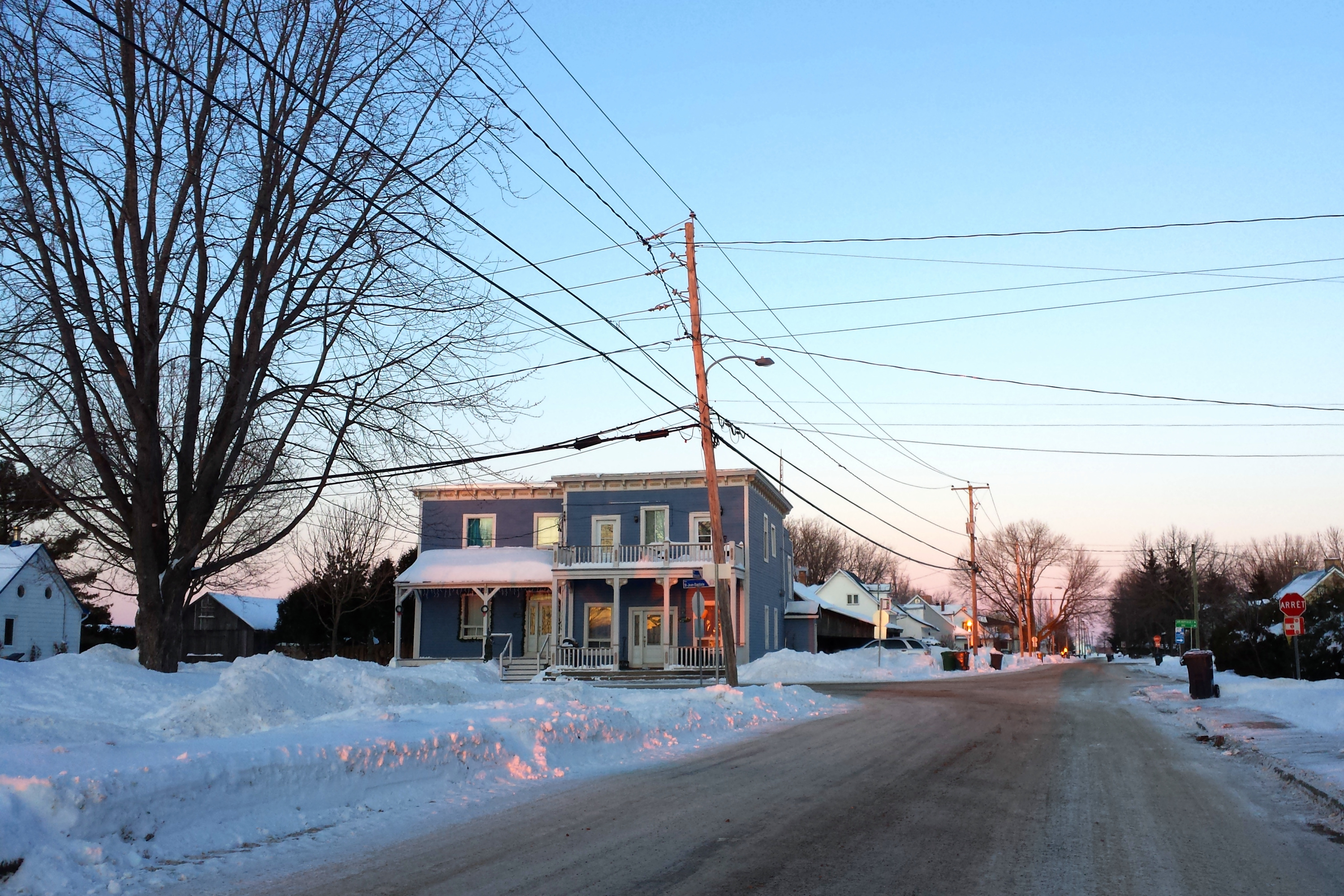
St-Benoit

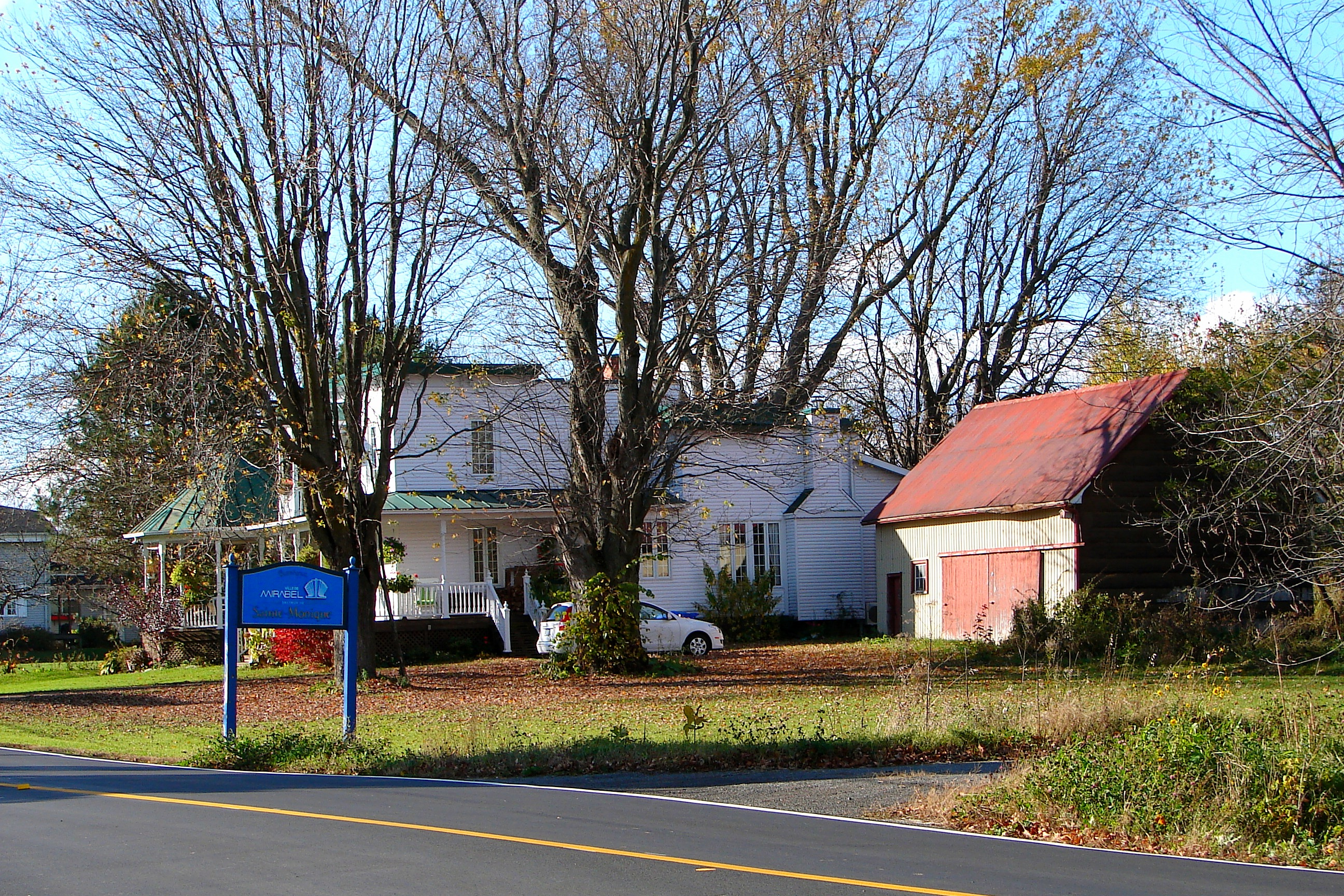
St-Monique

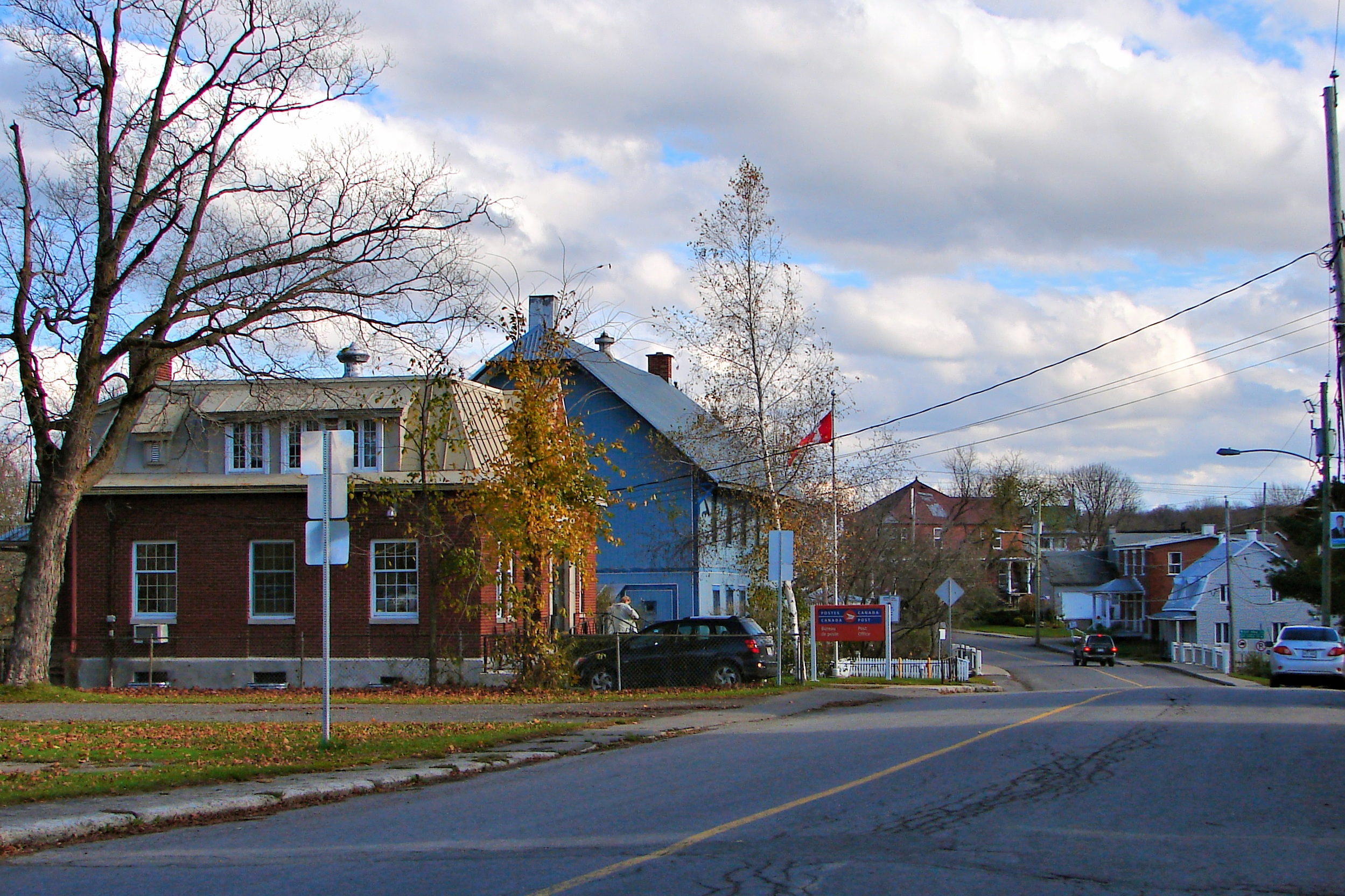
St-Scholastique

=== Climate ===
Climate data for Mirabel (Montréal–Mirabel International Airport) Climate ID: 6153300; coordinates 45°40′N 74°02′W; elevation: 82.6 m (271 ft); 1981–2010 normals, extremes 1975–2008
Month	Jan	Feb	Mar	Apr	May	Jun	Jul	Aug	Sep	Oct	Nov	Dec	Year
Record high humidex	12.5	12.3	21.7	34.2	39.4	45.5	45.5	45.4	40.2	32.7	22.9	18.6	45.5
Record high °C (°F)	12.0 (53.6)	12.6 (54.7)	21.8 (71.2)	31.1 (88.0)	31.4 (88.5)	33.5 (92.3)	33.6 (92.5)	36.1 (97.0)	33.3 (91.9)	26.7 (80.1)	19.8 (67.6)	16.4 (61.5)	36.1 (97.0)
Mean daily maximum °C (°F)	−6.5 (20.3)	−4.3 (24.3)	1.3 (34.3)	10.8 (51.4)	18.5 (65.3)	23.4 (74.1)	25.7 (78.3)	24.7 (76.5)	19.9 (67.8)	12.5 (54.5)	4.7 (40.5)	−2.7 (27.1)	10.7 (51.3)
Daily mean °C (°F)	−11.5 (11.3)	−9.5 (14.9)	−3.6 (25.5)	5.4 (41.7)	12.4 (54.3)	17.4 (63.3)	19.8 (67.6)	18.7 (65.7)	14.1 (57.4)	7.3 (45.1)	0.6 (33.1)	−7.1 (19.2)	5.3 (41.5)
Mean daily minimum °C (°F)	−16.5 (2.3)	−14.8 (5.4)	−8.5 (16.7)	0.0 (32.0)	6.3 (43.3)	11.4 (52.5)	14.0 (57.2)	12.7 (54.9)	8.1 (46.6)	2.0 (35.6)	−3.4 (25.9)	−11.5 (11.3)	0.0 (32.0)
Record low °C (°F)	−37.0 (−34.6)	−33.1 (−27.6)	−29.9 (−21.8)	−15.4 (4.3)	−3.9 (25.0)	−0.9 (30.4)	4.8 (40.6)	1.1 (34.0)	−5.3 (22.5)	−8.0 (17.6)	−22.1 (−7.8)	−33.0 (−27.4)	−37.0 (−34.6)
Record low wind chill	−50.0	−44.0	−40.0	−24.0	−10.0	−3.0	0.0	0.0	−7.0	−12.0	−28.0	−46.0	−50.0
Average precipitation mm (inches)	87.9 (3.46)	64.6 (2.54)	70.4 (2.77)	88.0 (3.46)	86.8 (3.42)	103.1 (4.06)	91.9 (3.62)	96.0 (3.78)	91.7 (3.61)	96.5 (3.80)	103.2 (4.06)	87.6 (3.45)	1,067.7 (42.04)
Average rainfall mm (inches)	32.0 (1.26)	21.8 (0.86)	30.7 (1.21)	72.9 (2.87)	86.5 (3.41)	103.1 (4.06)	91.9 (3.62)	95.9 (3.78)	91.7 (3.61)	93.1 (3.67)	80.4 (3.17)	36.0 (1.42)	835.9 (32.91)
Average snowfall cm (inches)	55.8 (22.0)	43.1 (17.0)	38.5 (15.2)	14.0 (5.5)	0.3 (0.1)	0.0 (0.0)	0.0 (0.0)	0.0 (0.0)	0.0 (0.0)	3.1 (1.2)	22.8 (9.0)	51.3 (20.2)	228.8 (90.1)
Average precipitation days (≥ 0.2 mm)	16.8	14.0	13.8	13.0	13.7	13.2	12.7	12.0	11.4	13.8	16.1	17.1	167.5
Average rainy days (≥ 0.2 mm)	4.4	3.9	6.4	11.2	13.7	13.2	12.7	12.0	11.4	13.4	11.5	5.9	119.6
Average snowy days (≥ 0.2 cm)	15.2	12.1	9.9	4.0	0.2	0.0	0.0	0.0	0.0	1.1	6.8	14.0	63.3
Average relative humidity (%)	66.0	61.3	58.0	50.9	51.0	56.2	58.3	58.9	60.7	61.5	68.9	71.3	60.2
Source: Environment and Climate Change Canada

== Demographics ==
Historical Census Data - Mirabel, Quebec
Year	Pop.	±%
1976	13,486	—
1981	14,080	+4.4%
1986	13,875	−1.5%
1991	17,971	+29.5%
1996	22,689	+26.3%
2001	27,315	+20.4%
2006	34,626	+26.8%
2011	41,957	+21.2%
2016	50,513	+20.4%
2021	61,108	+21.0%

In the 2021 Canadian census conducted by Statistics Canada, Mirabel had a population of 61,108 living in 24,795 of its 25,514 total private dwellings, a change of 21% from its 2016 population of 50,513. With a land area of 484.09 km^{2} (186.91 sq mi), it had a population density of 126.2/km^{2} (326.9/sq mi) in 2021.

Canada census – Mirabel community profile

	2021	2016	2011
Population	61,108 (+21.0% from 2016)	50,513 (+20.4% from 2011)	41,957 (+21.2% from 2006)
Land area	484.09 km^{2} (186.91 sq mi)	485.07 km^{2} (187.29 sq mi)	485.59 km^{2} (187.49 sq mi)
Population density	126.2/km^{2} (327/sq mi)	104.1/km^{2} (270/sq mi)	86.4/km^{2} (224/sq mi)
Median age	37.2 (M: 37.2, F: 37.6)	35.8 (M: 35.8, F: 35.7)	35.0 (M: 35.1, F: 34.8)
Private dwellings	25,514 (total) 24,795 (occupied)	20,395 (total)	16,374 (total)
Median household income	$90,000	$75,895	$67,023

References: 2021 2016 2011

=== Ethnicity ===
In 2021, Mirabel was 91.8% white/European, 6.5% visible minorities and 1.7% Indigenous. The largest visible minority groups were Black (1.9%), Arab (1.6%), and Latin American (1.0%).

Panethnic groups in the City of Mirabel (2001−2021)
Panethnic group	2021		2016		2011		2006		2001	
Panethnic group	Pop.	%	Pop.	%	Pop.	%	Pop.	%	Pop.	%
European (Note: Statistic includes all persons that did not make up part of a visible minority or an indigenous identity.)	55,845	91.77%	48,285	95.98%	40,630	97.66%	33,880	98.27%	26,785	98.8%
African	1,175	1.93%	495	0.98%	155	0.37%	160	0.46%	25	0.09%
Middle Eastern (Note: Statistic includes total responses of "West Asian" and "Arab" under visible minority section on census.)	1,140	1.87%	235	0.47%	45	0.11%	40	0.12%	10	0.04%
Indigenous	1,020	1.68%	575	1.14%	475	1.14%	140	0.41%	70	0.26%
Latin American	600	0.99%	290	0.58%	90	0.22%	90	0.26%	105	0.39%
Southeast Asian (Note: Statistic includes total responses of "Filipino" and "Southeast Asian" under visible minority section on census.)	440	0.72%	185	0.37%	100	0.24%	75	0.22%	85	0.31%
South Asian	260	0.43%	50	0.1%	25	0.06%	15	0.04%	10	0.04%
East Asian (Note: Statistic includes total responses of "Chinese", "Korean", and "Japanese" under visible minority section on census.)	230	0.38%	180	0.36%	50	0.12%	80	0.23%	35	0.13%
Other/multiracial (Note: Statistic includes total responses of "Visible minority, n.i.e." and "Multiple visible minorities" under visible minority section on census.)	140	0.23%	20	0.04%	20	0.05%	0	0%	0	0%
Total responses	60,850	99.58%	50,305	99.59%	41,605	99.16%	34,475	99.56%	27,110	99.25%
Total population	61,108	100%	50,513	100%	41,957	100%	34,626	100%	27,315	100%
Note: Totals greater than 100% due to multiple origin responses

=== Religion ===
63.9% of residents were Christian, down from 87% in 2011. 56.7% were Catholic, 5.2% were Christian n.o.s, 0.4% were Protestant and 1.6% belonged to other Christian denominations and Christian-related traditions. Of non-Catholic denominations, the largest is Christian Orthodox at 0.7%. 33.6% of residents were non-religious or secular, up from 12.2% in 2011. 2.5% belonged to other religions, up from 0.8% in 2011. The largest non-Christian religions were Islam (1.9%) and Buddhism (0.4%).

=== Language ===
90.8% of residents spoke French as their mother tongue. The next most common first languages were English (2.5%), Spanish (1.0%), Arabic (0.9%), and Portuguese (0.5%). 1.3% of residents listed both French and English as mother tongues, while 0.5% listed both French and a non-official language.

Mother Tongue	Population	Percentage
French	55,450	90.8%
English	1,520	2.5%
English and French	780	1.3%
French and a non-official language	295	0.5%
English and a non-official language	95	0.2%
English, French and a non-official language	110	0.2%
Spanish	615	1%
Arabic	575	0.9%
Portuguese	280	0.5%
Italian	155	0.3%
Romanian	125	0.2%
Dari	105	0.2%
Haitian Creole	75	0.1%

Canada Census Mother Tongue - Mirabel, Quebec
Census	Total	French			English			French & English			Other		
Year	Responses	Count	Trend	Pop %	Count	Trend	Pop %	Count	Trend	Pop %	Count	Trend	Pop %
2021	61,040	55,450	▲16.6%	90.8%	1,520	▲44.8%	2.5%	780	▲126.1%	1.3%	2,765	▲110.3%	4.5%
2016	50,513	47,560	▲14.8%	94,3%	1,050	▲21.9%	2.1%	345	▲43.7%	0.7%	1,315	▲87.5%	2.6%
2011	41,810	40,050	▲20.7%	95.8%	820	▲60.8%	2.0%	240	▲33.3%	0.6%	700	▲16.7%	1.7%
2006	34,475	33,185	▲27.3%	96.3%	510	▲10.9%	1.5%	180	▲16.1%	0.5%	600	▲36.4%	1.7%
2001	27,115	26,060	▲20.6%	96.1%	460	▲2.2%	1.7%	155	▲6.9%	0.6%	440	▲66.0%	1.6%
1996	22,465	21,605	n/a	96.2%	450	n/a	2.0%	145	n/a	0.7%	265	n/a	1.2%

== Economy ==
Airbus produces the Airbus A220 (formerly Bombardier CSeries) at the Montréal–Mirabel International Airport.

Bell Textron has its major commercial helicopter manufacturing and final assembly plant near the airport.

HydroSerre Mirabel has its headquarters in the town.

Until early 2021, Bombardier Aviation produced several models in its Bombardier CRJ700 series regional jet airliners at a plant near the airport.

== Sports ==
In 2023, the city inaugurated a brand new aquatic complex called the Centre aquatique de Mirabel. With a capacity of up to 700 swimmers, the new facility, valued at $37.78 million, offers residents a 25-metre competitive pool with 10 lanes, a recreational pool, a paddling pool, water games and a slide.

== Government ==
At the federal level, the city of Mirabel is part of the federal riding of Mirabel. Its Member of Parliament is Jean-Denis Garon of the Bloc Québécois. The city is also part of the Senate division of Mille-Isles. Its Senator is Claude Carignan of the Conservative Party. At the provincial level, most of Mirabel's territory is part of the provincial riding of Mirabel. Its Member of the National Assembly is Sylvie D'Amours of the Coalition Avenir Québec. However, the part of the municipality located east of Autoroute 15 is part of the riding of Les Plaines. It is represented by Lucie Lecours, also of the Coalition Avenir Québec.

== Infrastructure ==
=== Transport ===
==== Road ====
Quebec Route 117 (Boulevard du Curé-Labelle), which runs through the town of Mirabel, as well as the rest of the Laurentides, was the only road link to Montreal for many years. It was not until 1959 that the section of the Autoroute 15 (Sainte-Rose to Saint-Jérôme) opened to reduce traffic on Route 117. With the opening of Montréal–Mirabel International Airport in 1975, a new motorway, the Autoroute 50, was opened to serve the airport. Since 2012, this motorway has provided access to the city of Gatineau and, indirectly, to the Canadian capital, Ottawa. The city has three provincial roads: Routes 117, 148 and 158.

==== Rail ====
Plans for a station were proposed in the 2000s by Exo as part of the extension of the Saint-Jérôme line (formerly known as Blainville–Saint-Jérôme and Montréal–Blainville) to Saint-Jérôme, but were not implemented at the time. In 2013, the project resurfaced but was eventually postponed because the proposed location divided opinion, with the town hall and property developers on one side, and the Union des producteurs agricoles and the then Member of National Assembly, Denise Beaudoin, on the other. In autumn 2015, the project was relaunched and made progress the following year, until a station with 800 parking spaces was opened in the Saint-Janvier neighborhood. Construction of the station will begin in autumn 2019 and it will open on 4 January 2021.

Another rail project is the Réseau express métropolitain, a scheme originally proposed in a 1995 study by SNC-Lavalin to link Dorval and Mirabel airports via the Deux-Montagnes line. Since the closure of Mirabel Airport, the area has become a key economic hub for the city.

==== Air ====
Montréal–Mirabel International Airport was built on the initiative of Pierre Trudeau, former Prime Minister of Canada, in response to heavy air traffic, modelled on Paris, which led to the expropriation of agricultural land. The airport opened in 1975, and scheduled international passenger services ceased in 2004. Between 2008 and 2018, air traffic at the airport more than tripled, due to the increasing number of cargo flights. Mirabel Airport is also used for private passenger flights, helicopter flights, flights outside Quebec to transport employees of various companies, as well as for certain medical service aircraft. An increase in flight schools in the area, as well as test flights for aircraft manufactured by the aerospace companies based at the site, have also contributed to the sharp rise in air traffic. In 2019, it was announced that the original control tower at Mirabel Airport would be restored and used by newly trained air traffic controllers.

== Education ==
=== Centre de services scolaire des Mille-Îles ===
The Centre de services scolaire des Mille-Îles, which operates Francophone public schools, serves the following parts of Mirabel: Saint-Augustin, Saint-Benoît, Sainte-Scholastique and a portion of Domaine-Vert.

- École primaire de la Clé-des-Champs
- École primaire des Blés-Dorés
- École primaire Girouard
- École primaire Prés fleuris
- École primaire Sainte-Scholastique

Other elementary schools serving sections of CCSMI Mirabel: Notre-Dame-de-l'Assomption in Blainville and Terre-Soleil in Sainte-Thérèse. Secondary schools serving sections of CSSMI Mirabel: d'Oka in Oka, des Patriotes in Saint-Eustache, Henri-Dunant in Blainville, Jean-Jacques-Rousseau in Boisbriand, and Polyvalente Sainte-Thérèse in Sainte-Thérèse.

The area was formerly in the Commission scolaire de la Seigneurie-des-Mille-Îles (CSSMI).

=== Centre de services scolaire de la Rivière-du-Nord ===
The Centre de services scolaire de la Rivière-du-Nord operates Francophone public schools in other parts of Mirabel. They include:

- Secondary schools:
  - École secondaire de Mirabel (ESM)
  - Other secondary schools serving CSSRDN sections include Polyvalente Lavigne in Lachute and Cap-Jeunesse, Émilien-Frenette, Polyvalente Saint-Jérôme, and Saint-Stanlislas in Saint-Jérôme
- Primary schools:
  - du Parchemin
  - à l'Unisson
  - aux Quatre-Vents
  - de la Croisée-des-Champs
  - Mer-et-Monde
  - Saint-Anne
  - Saint-Hermas
  - Other primary schools serving CSSRDN Mirabel include Dubois, de l'Horizon-Soleil, Prévost, Saint-Jean-Baptiste, and Sainte-Thérèse-de-l'Enfant-Jésus in Saint-Jérôme and Jean-Moreau in Sainte-Sophie.

It was formerly in the Commission scolaire de la Rivière-du-Nord (CSRDN).

=== Sir Wilfrid Laurier School Board ===
The Sir Wilfrid Laurier School Board operates anglophone public schools in the area around Mirabel.

Secondary schools serving portions of Mirabel include:

- Lake of Two Mountains High School in Deux-Montagnes serves southern Mirabel
- Laurentian Regional High School in Lachute serves northern Mirabel
- Rosemère High School in Rosemère serves southeast Mirabel

Primary schools serving portions of Mirabel include:

- Laurentia Elementary School in Saint-Jérôme serves northern Mirabel
- Mountainview Elementary School and Saint Jude Elementary School in Deux-Montagnes serve southern Mirabel
- Pierre Elliot Trudeau Elementary School in Blainville serves southeast Mirabel

== Sister cities ==
- Châlons-en-Champagne (France)

== See also ==
- List of regional county municipalities and equivalent territories in Quebec
- Mirabel Aerospace Centre
- Saint Pierre River (Mirabel)
- Rivière aux Chiens (rivière des Mille Îles)
