= Rivière aux Chiens (rivière des Mille Îles) =

Location
- Country: Canada
- Province: Quebec
- Administrative region: Laurentides
- Regional County Municipality: Mirabel

Physical characteristics
- Source
  - location: Brook of sector "Saint-Augustin" in Mirabel
  - coordinates: 45°38′05″N 73°56′02″W
  - elevation: 50 m (160 ft)
- Mouth
  - location: Rivière des Mille Îles
  - coordinates: 45°39′01″N 73°46′12″W
  - elevation: 15 m (49 ft)
- Length: 17.0 km (10.6 mi)

Basin features
- Progression: rivière des Mille Îles, rivière des Prairies, Saint Lawrence River
- Tributaries
  - left: Ruisseau Charron, ruisseau Desjardins, ruisseau Gohier
  - right: Ruisseau Labelle

The rivière aux Chiens is a tributary of rivière des Mille Îles, flowing on the north shore of the St Lawrence River, in the administrative region of Laurentides, in the southwest of the province of Quebec, in Canada. This river crosses the Regional County Municipality (RCM) of:

- Mirabel;
- Thérèse-De Blainville Regional County Municipality: cities of Sainte-Thérèse-de-Blainville, Rosemère et Lorraine.

== Geography ==
The upper part of this river crosses eastwards an agricultural plain between the village of "Saint-Augustin" (Mirabel) and the urban center of Sainte-Thérèse-de-Blainville. The rest of its course runs through Sainte-Thérèse-de-Blainville and Lorraine.

The "Rivière aux Chiens" has its source near the "Blainville Street East" in Mirabel. This source is located at:

- 4.3 kilometres (2.7 mi) southwest of Highway 15;
- 9.0 kilometres (5.6 mi) southeast of the terminal of the Mirabel Airport;
- 8.0 kilometres (5.0 mi) north-west of rivière des Mille Îles;
- 12.2 kilometres (7.6 mi) west of the confluence of the "rivière aux Chiens".

Course of the river

From its source, the "rivière aux Chiens" flows over 17.0 kilometres (10.6 mi), according to the following segments:

- 1.1 kilometres (0.68 mi) to the southeast in Mirabel up to the limit of the city Sainte-Thérèse-de-Blainville;
- 4.5 kilometres (2.8 mi) eastward up to the bridge of the Highway 15;
- 5.9 kilometres (3.7 mi) eastward, crossing the urban center of Sainte-Thérèse-de-Blainville, up to the boundary of the city of Rosemère;
- 1.5 kilometres (0.93 mi) to the northeast, up to the bridge of the Highway 640;
- 2.5 kilometres (1.6 mi) to the east, up to the limit of Lorraine;
- 1.5 kilometres (0.93 mi) to the southeast, up to the confluence of the river

The confluence of the "rivière aux Chiens" flows on the north bank of the rivière des Mille Îles or up to limit Rosemère and Lorraine; and 0.5 kilometres (0.31 mi) upstream of Garth island.

== Toponymy ==
The place name "Rivière aux Chiens" reflects the importance that rural families agreed to dogs as pets. On dairy farms, the dog had great help especially for security, movement of herds, hunting and hitch for pulling sleds.

The place name "rivière aux Chiens" was formalized on December 5, 1968, at the Commission de toponymie du Québec.

== See also ==
- Mirabel, a city
- Sainte-Thérèse-de-Blainville, a city
- Rosemère, a city
- Lorraine, a city
- Rivière des Mille Îles, a stream
- List of rivers of Quebec
