= Blainville, Quebec =

Blainville
- City
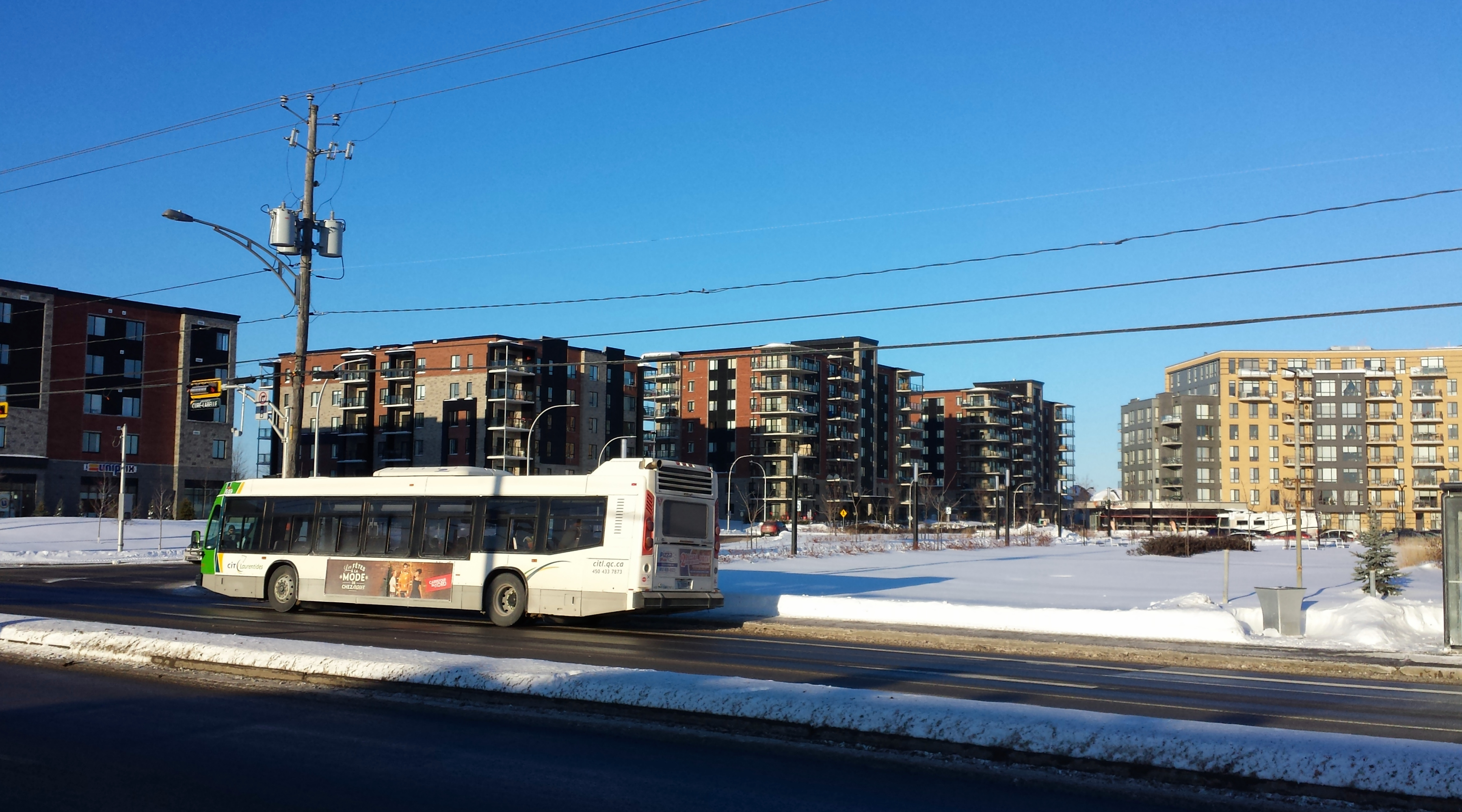

- Coat of arms

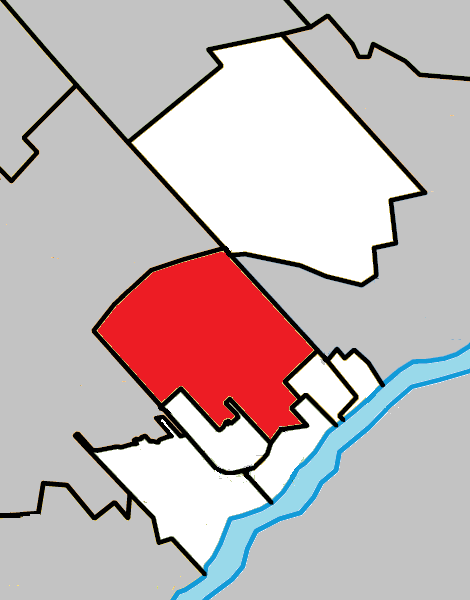
- Location within Thérèse-De Blainville RCM

- Location in central Quebec
- Coordinates: 45°40′N 73°53′W
- Country: Canada
- Province: Quebec
- Region: Laurentides
- RCM: Thérèse-De Blainville
- Constituted: July 1, 1855

Government
  - Mayor: Liza Poulin
  - Federal riding: Thérèse-De Blainville
  - Prov. riding: Blainville and Groulx

Area
  - Total: 55.50 km^{2} (21.43 sq mi)
  - Land: 55.10 km^{2} (21.27 sq mi)

Population (2021)
  - Total: 59,819
  - Density: 1,030.9/km^{2} (2,670/sq mi)
  - Pop 2011–2016: ▲6.3%
- Time zone: UTC−5 (EST)
  - Summer (DST): UTC−4 (EDT)
- Postal code(s): J7B–J7C
- Area codes: 450 and 579
- Highways A-15 (TCH): R-117
- Website: blainville.ca

Blainville (French pronunciation: [blɛ̃vil]) is a suburb of Montreal located on the North Shore in southwestern Quebec, Canada. Blainville forms part of the Thérèse-De Blainville Regional County Municipality within the Laurentides region of Quebec. The town sits at the foot of the Laurentian Mountains and is located 35 kilometres (22 mi) northwest of downtown Montreal.

== History ==
Louis de Buade de Frontenac granted a vast territory that includes present-day Blainville to elite members of society, lords ("seigneurs") or seigneurs, to promote the development of New France in 1683. The Seigneurie des Mille Îles (Lordship of the Thousand Islands) encompassed over 200 square kilometres (77 mi^{2}) along the northern shores of the Mille Îles River.

In 1792, a disagreement between Seigneur Hertel and Seigneuresse Lamarque resulted in a division of the seigneurial territory along what was then-called the Great Line (present-day Boulevard du Curé-Labelle or Quebec Route 117).

Blainville is named for the third lord of the seigneurie, Jean-Baptiste Céloron de Blainville (1660-1756).

On 14 June 1968, the parish of Sainte-Thérèse-de-Blainville was divided, and Blainville formed its own town consisting of mostly heretofore undeveloped land. In 2017, the municipality governed 54.62 square kilometres (21.09 mi^{2}) subdivided into eleven districts, maintained an independent police force with a budget in excess of $14 million CAD and more than 110 staff, a fire department with over 70 firefighters, who since 2016 also serve the neighbouring municipality of Rosemère, a library with three branches, an arena with two rinks, and an aquatic recreation centre.

== Geography ==
=== Climate ===
Climate data for Blainville (by nearby Mirabel, Quebec)
Month	Jan	Feb	Mar	Apr	May	Jun	Jul	Aug	Sep	Oct	Nov	Dec	Year
Mean daily maximum °C (°F)	−6.5 (20.3)	−4.3 (24.3)	1.3 (34.3)	10.8 (51.4)	18.5 (65.3)	23.4 (74.1)	25.7 (78.3)	24.7 (76.5)	19.9 (67.8)	12.5 (54.5)	4.7 (40.5)	−2.7 (27.1)	10.7 (51.3)
Daily mean °C (°F)	−11.5 (11.3)	−9.5 (14.9)	−3.6 (25.5)	5.4 (41.7)	12.4 (54.3)	17.4 (63.3)	19.8 (67.6)	18.7 (65.7)	14.1 (57.4)	7.3 (45.1)	0.6 (33.1)	−7.1 (19.2)	5.3 (41.5)
Mean daily minimum °C (°F)	−16.5 (2.3)	−14.8 (5.4)	−8.5 (16.7)	-0.0 (32.0)	6.3 (43.3)	11.4 (52.5)	14.0 (57.2)	12.7 (54.9)	8.1 (46.6)	2.0 (35.6)	−3.4 (25.9)	−11.5 (11.3)	-0.0 (32.0)
Average precipitation mm (inches)	87.9 (3.46)	64.6 (2.54)	70.4 (2.77)	88.0 (3.46)	86.8 (3.42)	103.1 (4.06)	91.9 (3.62)	96.0 (3.78)	91.7 (3.61)	96.5 (3.80)	103.2 (4.06)	87.6 (3.45)	1,067.7 (42.04)
Average snowfall cm (inches)	55.8 (22.0)	43.1 (17.0)	38.5 (15.2)	14.0 (5.5)	0.3 (0.1)	0.0 (0.0)	0.0 (0.0)	0.0 (0.0)	0.0 (0.0)	3.1 (1.2)	22.8 (9.0)	51.3 (20.2)	228.8 (90.1)
Source: ECCC

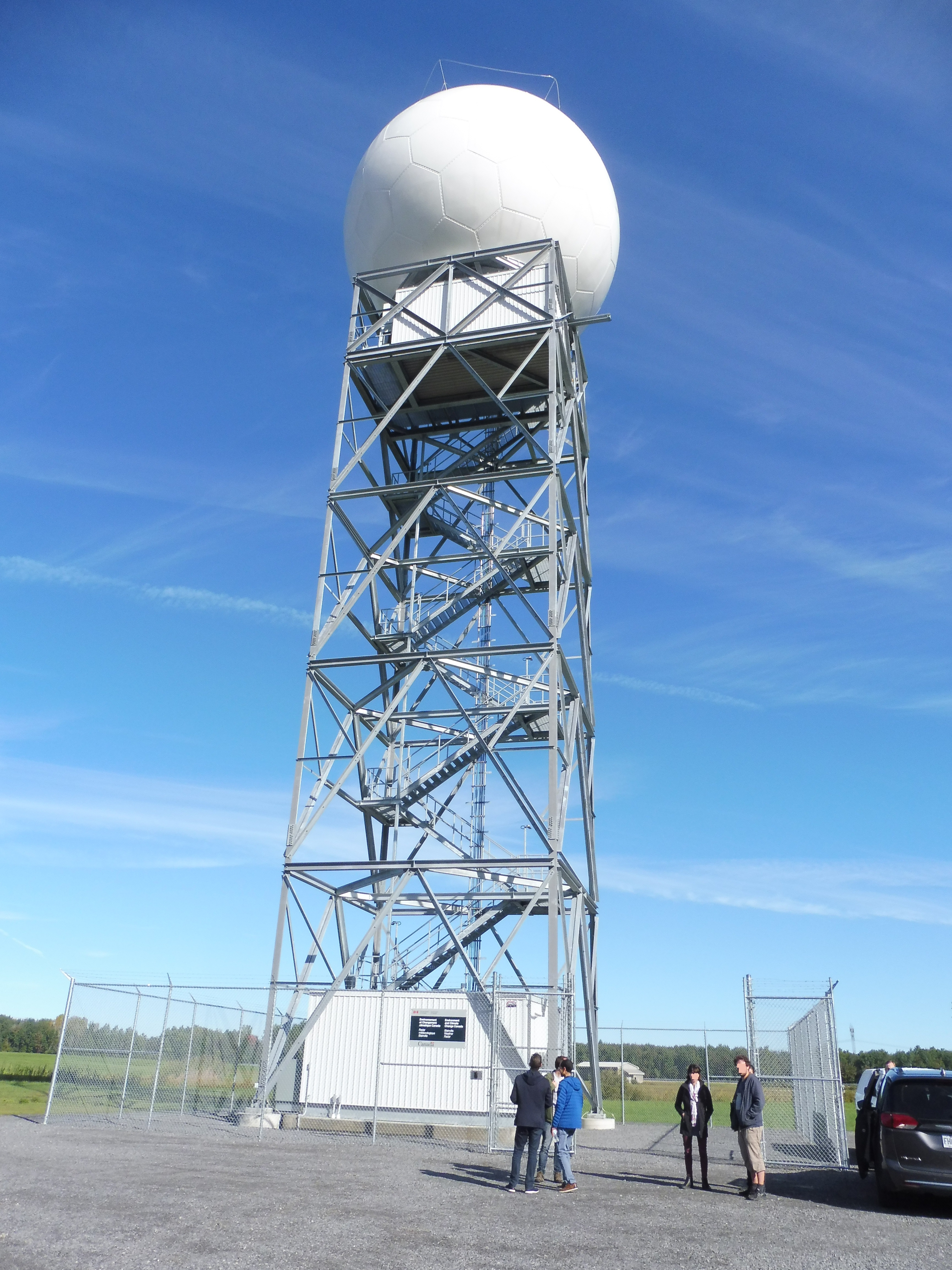
The Blainville radar, part of the Canadian weather radar network, was commissioned in 2018.

== Demographics ==
In the 2021 Census of Population conducted by Statistics Canada, Blainville had a population of 59,819 living in 22,424 of its 22,859 total private dwellings, a change of 5.2% from its 2016 population of 56,863. With a land area of 54.97 km^{2} (21.22 sq mi), it had a population density of 1,088.2/km^{2} (2,818.5/sq mi) in 2021. Over 8% of residents are under 15, whereas 67% are between 15 and 64 and 15% are over 65.

=== Ethnicity ===
In 2021, 86.5% of Blainville residents were white/European, 12.3% were visible minorities and 1.2% were Indigenous. The largest visible minority groups were Arab (3.6%), Black (3.3%), Latin American (1.7%), Southeast Asian (0.9%), and Chinese (0.9%).

Panethnic groups in the City of Blainville (2001−2021)
Panethnic group	2021		2016		2011		2006		2001	
Panethnic group	Pop.	%	Pop.	%	Pop.	%	Pop.	%	Pop.	%
European (Note: Statistic includes all persons that did not make up part of a visible minority or an indigenous identity.)	51,035	86.49%	52,465	92.95%	50,150	94.5%	44,970	96.72%	35,405	98.31%
Middle Eastern (Note: Statistic includes total responses of "West Asian" and "Arab" under visible minority section on census.)	2,425	4.11%	980	1.74%	470	0.89%	325	0.7%	40	0.11%
African	1,970	3.34%	1,265	2.24%	910	1.71%	345	0.74%	115	0.32%
Latin American	1,020	1.73%	430	0.76%	515	0.97%	260	0.56%	100	0.28%
Indigenous	735	1.25%	410	0.73%	410	0.77%	150	0.32%	95	0.26%
Southeast Asian (Note: Statistic includes total responses of "Filipino" and "Southeast Asian" under visible minority section on census.)	645	1.09%	445	0.79%	270	0.51%	205	0.44%	120	0.33%
East Asian (Note: Statistic includes total responses of "Chinese", "Korean", and "Japanese" under visible minority section on census.)	645	1.09%	225	0.4%	145	0.27%	165	0.35%	100	0.28%
South Asian	335	0.57%	155	0.27%	120	0.23%	50	0.11%	40	0.11%
Other/multiracial (Note: Statistic includes total responses of "Visible minority, n.i.e." and "Multiple visible minorities" under visible minority section on census.)	215	0.36%	85	0.15%	65	0.12%	20	0.04%	10	0.03%
Total responses	59,005	98.64%	56,445	99.26%	53,070	99.18%	46,495	100%	36,015	99.96%
Total population	59,819	100%	56,863	100%	53,510	100%	46,493	100%	36,029	100%
Note: Totals greater than 100% due to multiple origin responses

=== Religion ===
66.9% of residents were Christian, down from 87.1% in 2011. 57.3% were Catholic, 6.3% were Christian n.o.s, 0.8% were Protestant and 2.5% belonged to other Christian denominations and Christian-related traditions. Of non-Catholic denominations, the largest is Christian Orthodox at 1.9%. 28.0% of residents were non-religious or secular, up from 11.6% in 2011. 5.1% belonged to other religions, up from 1.3% in 2011. The largest non-Christian religions were Islam (4.2%) and Buddhism (0.4%).

=== Language ===
The 2021 census found that 82.2% of residents spoke French as a mother tongue. Although 60.0% of residents reported knowledge of both English and French, English was the mother tongue of only 4.1% of respondents. The next most frequent native languages were Arabic (2.3%), Spanish (1.7%), and Portuguese (1.0%).

Mother Tongue	Population	Percentage
French	48,570	82.2%
English	2,430	4.1%
English and French	970	1.6%
French and a non-official language	630	1.1%
English and a non-official language	175	0.3%
English, French and a non-official language	200	0.3%
Arabic	1,380	2.3%
Spanish	1,015	1.7%
Portuguese	565	1.0%
Italian	445	0.8%
Romanian	390	0.7%
Chinese Languages	280	0.5%
Persian	255	0.4%

Canada Census Mother Tongue - Blainville, Quebec
Census	Total	French			English			French & English			Other		
Year	Responses	Count	Trend	Pop %	Count	Trend	Pop %	Count	Trend	Pop %	Count	Trend	Pop %
2021	59,115	48,570	▼2.11%	82.16%	2,430	▲18.25%	4.11%	970	▲76.36%	1.64%	6,100	▲52.31%	10.32
2016	56,755	49,620	▲3.58%	87.42%	2,055	▲18.44%	3.62%	550	▲19.56%	0.96%	4,005	▲28.98%	7.05%
2011	53,510	47,905	▲12.74%	89.52%	1,735	▲12.66%	3.24%	460	▲104.44%	0.86%	3,105	▲25.96%	5.8%
2006	46,493	42,490	▲27.10%	91.39%	1,540	▲75%	3.31%	225	▲12.5%	0.48%	2,465	▲64.33%	5.30%
2001	36,015	33,430	▲21.66%	92.82%	880	▲41.93%	2.4%	200	▼20%	0.55%	1500	▲38.88%	4.1%
1996	29,603	27,560	n/a	93.15%	620	n/a	2.09%	250	n/a	0.8%	1,080	n/a	3.64%

== Economy ==
The brewery of Les Brasseurs du Nord, makers of Boréale beer, is located in Blainville.

== Sports ==
Blainville co-hosted the 2009 Quebec Winter Games along with Rosemère and Sainte-Thérèse. The application of the three cities was sponsored by Gaétan Boucher, a former Canadian Olympic speed skating champion and four time Olympic medalist. The event took place in March, and a semi-Olympic pool was built in Blainville.

In July 2004, Le Fontainebleau Golf Club hosted John Daly, Vijay Singh, Phil Mickelson and Hank Kuehne. In July 2010, it hosted the Montreal Championship, a PGA Tour event. The event had been scheduled again in 2011 but did not take place. The event has since relocated to the La Vallée du Richelieu Golf Club on the south shore.

The city's soccer team is A.S. Blainville. Blainville also has a hockey team which competes in the QMJHL, the Blainville-Boisbriand Armada.

== Government ==
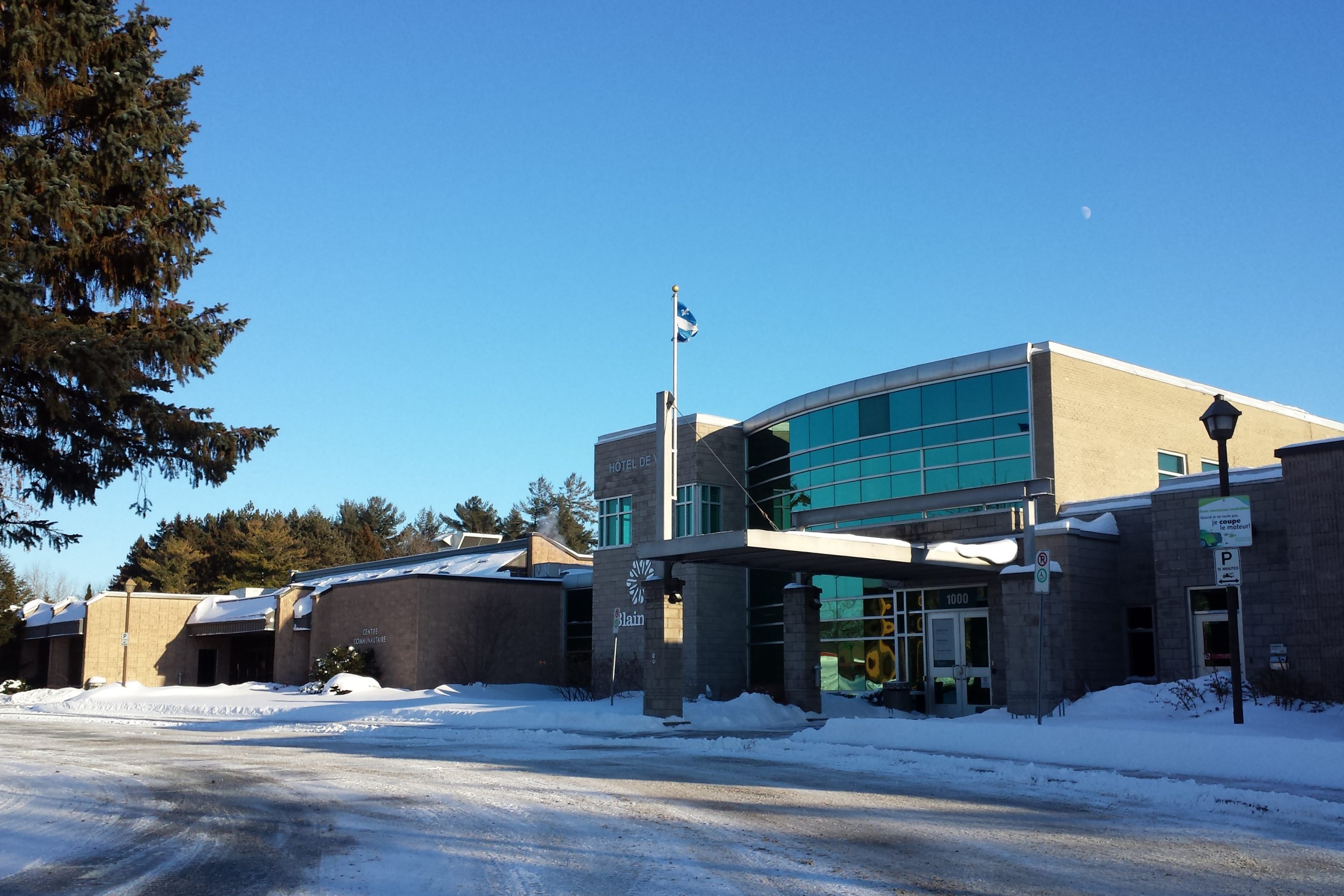
Blainville city hall

Richard Perreault, the leader of Vrai Blainville, has served as mayor since his 59-41 win against Florent Gravel (Mouvemment Blainville) in 2013. In 2017, he was re-elected with over 75% of the vote in a race that pitted him against Gravel again.

Blainville forms part of the federal electoral district of Therese-de-Blainville and has been represented by Louise Chabot of the Bloc Québécois since 2019. Provincially, Blainville is part of the Blainville electoral district and is represented by Mario Laframboise of the Coalition Avenir Québec party.

Former mayors

- Roger Boisvert (1968-1973)
- André De Carufel (1973-1977)
- Paul Mercier (1977-1993)
- Onil Charron (1993)
- Pierre Gingras (1993-2005)
- François Cantin (2005-2013)
- Richard Perreault (2013-)

== Infrastructure ==
Blainville is served by the Blainville commuter rail station on the Réseau de transport métropolitain's Saint-Jérôme line. Local bus service is provided by RTM Laurentides.

== Education ==
The Commission scolaire de la Seigneurie-des-Mille-Îles (CSSMI) operates Francophone public schools.

- 10 elementary schools in Blainville as well as one in Lorraine and one in Sainte-Thérèse
- École secondaire Henri-Dunant
- École secondaire Lucille-Teasdale
- Some areas in Blainville are served by École Polyvalente Sainte-Thérèse in Sainte-Thérèse, École secondaire Hubert-Maisonneuve in Rosemère, and École secondaire Rive-Nord in Bois-des-Filion

Sir Wilfrid Laurier School Board operates Anglophone public schools:

- Pierre Elliot Trudeau Elementary School (the majority) in Blainville
- McCaig Elementary School (a portion) in Rosemère
- Rosemère High School in Rosemère

== Notable people ==
- Aleksandra Wozniak, tennis player
- Donald Audette, hockey player
- Kristian Matte, football player

== See also ==
- Rivière aux Chiens, tributary of Rivière des Mille Îles
