= Lorraine, Quebec =

Lorraine
- City
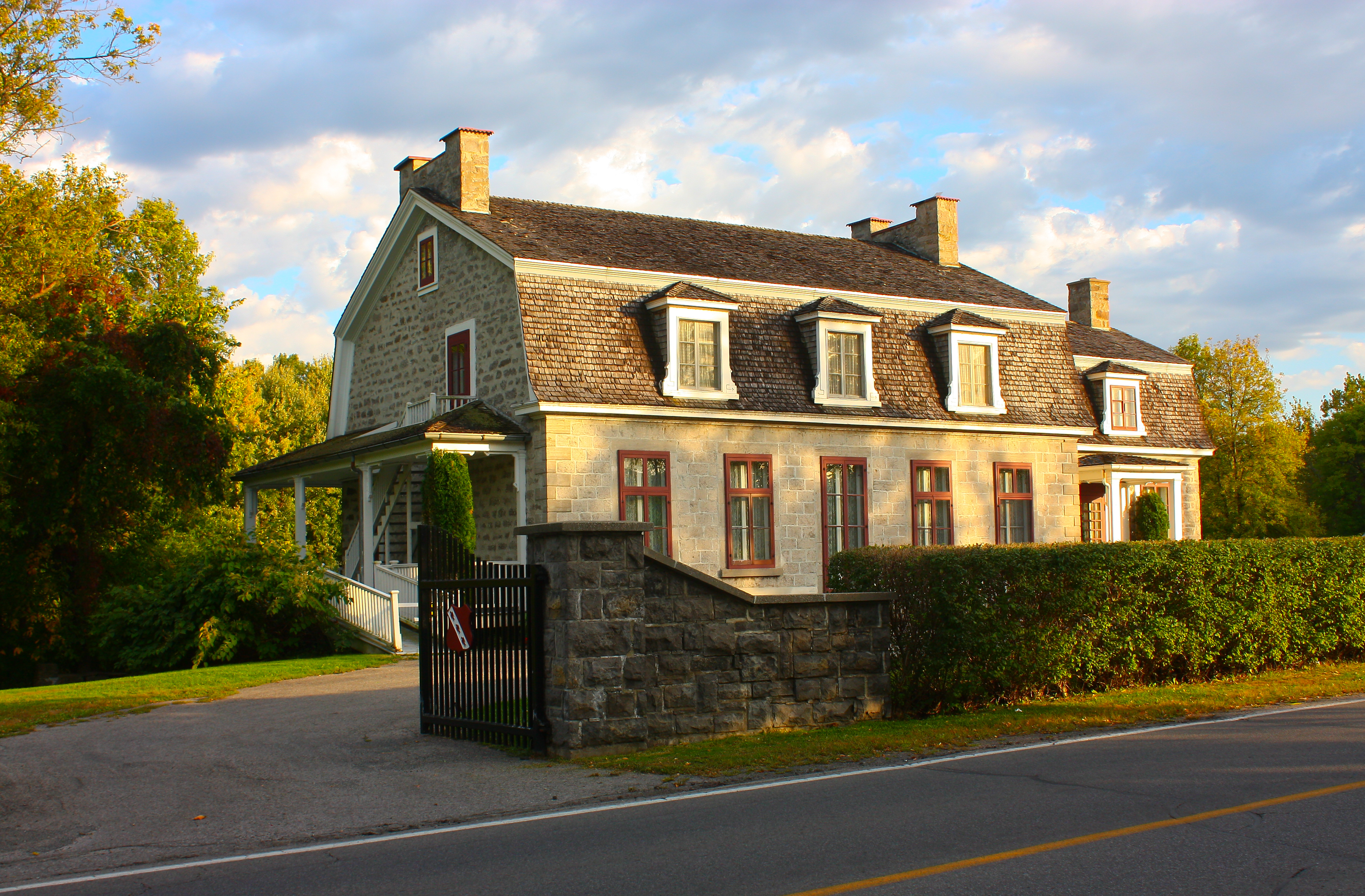
- Garth House.

- Coat of arms

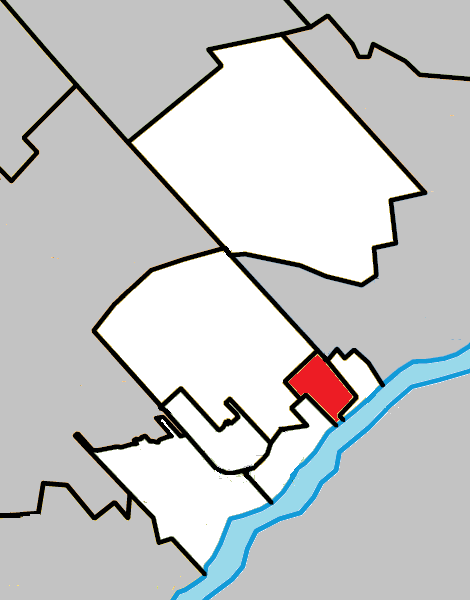
- Location within Thérèse-De Blainville RCM.

- Location in central Quebec.
- Coordinates: 45°39′35″N 73°46′36″W
- Country: Canada
- Province: Quebec
- Region: Laurentides
- RCM: Thérèse-De Blainville
- Constituted: February 4, 1960

Government
  - Type: Lorraine City Council
  - Mayor: Jean Comtois
  - Federal riding: Thérèse-De Blainville
  - Prov. riding: Blainville

Area
  - Total: 6.02 km^{2} (2.32 sq mi)
  - Land: 5.89 km^{2} (2.27 sq mi)
- There is an apparent contradiction between two authoritative sources

Population (2016)
  - Total: 9,352
  - Density: 1,570/km^{2} (4,100/sq mi)
  - Pop 2006–2011: ▼1.3%
- Time zone: UTC−5 (EST)
  - Summer (DST): UTC−4 (EDT)
- Postal code(s): J6Z
- Area code: Area codes 450
- Highways A-640: R-344
- Website: www.ville.lorraine.qc.ca

Lorraine (French pronunciation: [lɔʁɛn]) is an affluent off-island suburb of Montreal, in southwestern Quebec, Canada on the north shore of the Rivière des Mille-Îles in the Thérèse-De Blainville Regional County Municipality. There are no industries and only a very limited commercial district (comprising one medical centre, one shopping mall, a golf course, a gym, a supermarket and arena); almost all houses are of the detached type. Furthermore, a large portion of the town territory is set aside as wild forest (Forêt du Grand Côteau); some bike/ski trails run through it. The town is divided into two areas, upper and lower (or Lorraine en haut and Lorraine en bas, colloquially, because the northern area is on higher ground). These two areas are also delimited by Quebec freeway A-640, and are only joined together by the main street (Boulevard de Gaulle) overpass.

Lorraine has earned a reputation for high-end homes with pristine lawns. Due to the heat and humidity of summers in the region, many of these properties have in ground swimming pools in backyards. The town prides itself with completely underground utility networks apart from a small older section of the town (Avenue Fraser, Mey and Bruyeres in particular). The absence of telephone and electric poles contributes to the aesthetic appeal of the municipality.

The town was founded February 4, 1960 and is named for the French region of the same name.

The town is the territory of the Roman Catholic parishal community of Charles-de-Foucault (old parish), part of the (new) Saint-Luc parish of the Terrebonne pastoral region of the Saint-Jérôme diocese. The town is now part of the Thérèse-De Blainville federal electoral district (Marc-Aurèle-Fortin federal electoral district) and Blainville provincial electoral district. It makes district 22 of the Seigneurie-des-Milles-Îles French school board and is part of district 8 of the Sir-Wilfrid-Laurier English school board. Lorraine is also a member of the Montreal Metropolitan Community.

The town has three elementary schools: École Le Carrefour and École Le Tournesol, which are very close to each other but separated by Parc Lorraine, as well as École du Ruisselet.

== History ==
This town was founded in 1960 on the Garth estate, land which would have served as the headquarters of the British army during the Patriote rebellion in 1837. Maison Garth, built-in 1833, is listed as a historic monument, although still in use. This model residential community was founded as part of a federal program of the defunct Ministry of Urban Affairs, which encouraged the creation of “new towns”.

== Education ==
The Commission scolaire de la Seigneurie-des-Mille-Îles (CSSMI) operates Francophone public schools.

Francophone primary schools:

- École Le Carrefour
- École Le Tournesol
- École du Ruisselet

Zoned secondary schools include: École secondaire de Harfang in Sainte-Anne-des-Plaines; and École secondaire Hubert-Maisonneuve in Rosemère (for lower secondary) and École secondaire Rive-Nord in Bois-des-Filion.

Sir Wilfrid Laurier School Board operates Anglophone public schools:

- McCaig Elementary School in Rosemère.
- Rosemère High School in Rosemère.

== Activities ==
=== Activities for children ===
Municipal swimming pool, tennis court, soccer fields and basketball as well as the many parks of Lorraine will be able to fill the small and bigger. The Recreation and Cultural Services Department offers a variety of activities and events dedicated to children.

=== Activities for adults ===
Volunteering, library program, lectures on various topics, exhibitions, competitions, mobile library and many other activities are available in the city.

== Climate ==
The climate of this city is a humid continental climate. Winters are cold with a lot of snowfall and summers are hot and humid. There are 4 seasons spring, summer, autumn and winter.

== Demographics ==
In the 2021 Census of Population conducted by Statistics Canada, Lorraine had a population of 9,502 living in 3,393 of its 3,437 total private dwellings, a change of 1.6% from its 2016 population of 9,352. With a land area of 5.9 km^{2} (2.3 sq mi), it had a population density of 1,610.5/km^{2} (4,171.2/sq mi) in 2021.

Canada Census Mother Tongue - Lorraine, Quebec
Census	Total	French			English			French & English			Other		
Year	Responses	Count	Trend	Pop %	Count	Trend	Pop %	Count	Trend	Pop %	Count	Trend	Pop %
2016	9,350	7,700	▼3.38%	82.35%	680	▲6.25%	7.2%	125	▼7.4%	1.34%	765	▲19.53%	8.18%
2011	9,480	7970	▼2.4%	84.07%	640	▼7.9%	6.7%	135	▼20.58%	1.4%	640	▲11.3%	6.75%
2006	9,613	8170	▲0.03%	85.01%	695	▼7.94%	7.23%	170	▲126.66%	1.7%	575	▲19.79%	5.8%
2001	9,476	8165	▲7.01%	86.12%	755	▼8.48%	7.9%	75	▲50%	0.8%	480	▲37.14%	5.1%
1996	8,875	7630	n/a	85.97%	825	n/a	9.29%	50	n/a	0.5%	350	n/a	3.94%

== Awards ==
In 2007 the town of Lorraine was recognized by the Canadian Society of Landscape Architects under the Awards of Excellence Program for 'La Promenade Riveraine Du Domaine Garth' project.

== Facts ==
According to the Canada 2006 Census:

- Population: 9352
- Population growth (2011–2016) - 1,3 %
- Area: 6.04 km².

According to the Regions and Municipal Affairs Ministry of Quebec (as of 2017):

- Population: 9589
- Area: 6.02 km².

== See also ==
- Rivière aux Chiens (rivière des Mille Îles), a river
