= North Shore (Montreal) =

Term for the northern suburbs of Montreal, Canada

Coordinates: 45°40′N 73°50′W

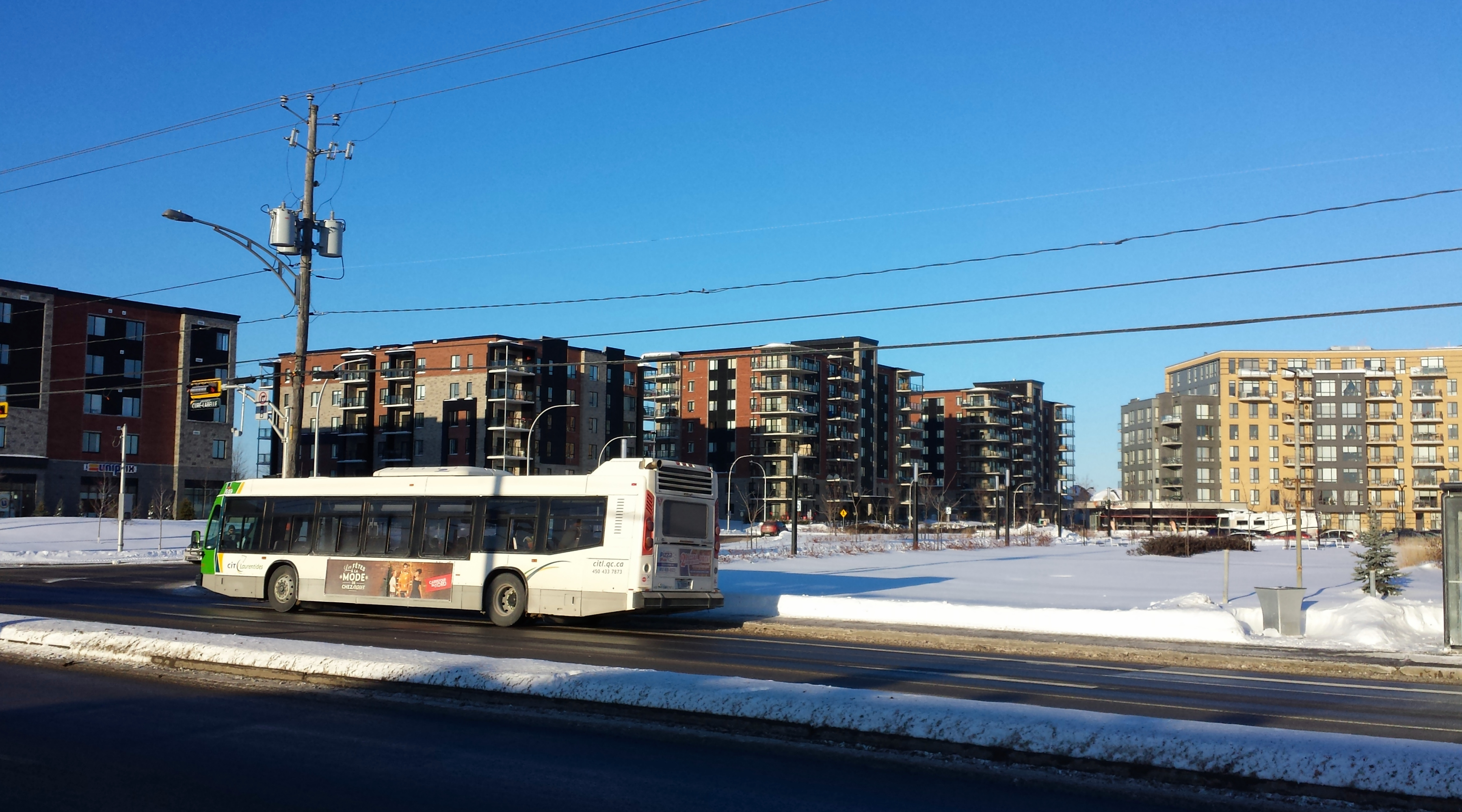
Blainville, one of the more populous cities on the North Shore

The North Shore (French: Rive-Nord, pronounced [ʁiv nɔʁ]) is the general term for the northern suburbs of Montreal. The North Shore is located in southwestern Quebec on the northern shore Rivière des Mille Îles, opposite the Île Jésus (the city of Laval). It consists of twenty municipalities that belong to the Laurentides and Lanaudière administrative regions. While the city of Laval is commonly associated with the North Shore, it is not considered part of the North Shore because of its status as an island.

== Included Municipalities ==
=== Laurentians ===
- Blainville
- Bois-des-Filion
- Boisbriand
- Deux-Montagnes
- Lorraine
- Mirabel
- Oka
- Pointe-Calumet
- Rosemère
- Saint-Eustache
- Saint-Joseph-du-Lac
- Sainte-Anne-des-Plaines
- Sainte-Marthe-sur-le-Lac
- Sainte-Thérèse

=== Lanaudière ===
- Charlemagne
- L'Assomption
- Mascouche
- Repentigny
- Saint-Sulpice
- Terrebonne
- Joliette
- Lavaltrie

== See also ==
- List of crossings of the Rivière des Prairies
- List of crossings of the Rivière des Mille Îles
- Off-island suburbs
- South Shore (Montreal)
- Quebec Autoroute 13
- Quebec Autoroute 15
- Quebec Autoroute 19
- Quebec Autoroute 25
- Quebec Autoroute 640
