= Thérèse-De Blainville Regional County Municipality =

Thérèse-De Blainville
- Regional county municipality
- Location in province of Quebec.
- Coordinates: 45°40′N 73°53′W
- Country: Canada
- Province: Quebec
- Region: Laurentides
- Effective: May 26, 1982
- County seat: Sainte-Thérèse

Government
  - Type: Prefecture
  - Prefect: Eric Westram

Area
  - Total: 211.90 km^{2} (81.82 sq mi)
  - Land: 206.52 km^{2} (79.74 sq mi)

Population (2021)
  - Total: 163,632
  - Density: 792.3/km^{2} (2,052/sq mi)
  - Change 2016–2021: ▲3.5%
- Time zone: UTC−5 (EST)
  - Summer (DST): UTC−4 (EDT)
- Area codes: 450 and 579
- Website: www.mrc-tdb.org

Thérèse-De Blainville (French pronunciation: [teʁɛz də blɛ̃vil]) is a regional county municipality in the Laurentides region of Quebec, Canada. It is located immediately north of Laval on the north shore of the Rivière des Mille-Îles.

The population according to the 2021 Canadian Census was 163,632.

== Subdivisions ==
There are 7 subdivisions within the RCM, and they are all classified as "Villes" (City or Town):

Cities & Towns	Population (2021)	Population (2016)	Change (%) 2016-2021	Land Area (km^{2})	Land Area (mi^{2})	Population density (km^{2})	Population density (mi^{2})
Blainville	59,819	56,863	+5.2%	54.97	21.22	1,088	2,819
Bois-des-Filion	10,159	9,636	+5.4%	4.36	1.68	2,330	6,047
Boisbriand	28,308	26,884	+5.3%	27.67	10.68	1,023	2,651
Lorraine	9,502	9,352	+1.6%	5.90	2.28	1,611	4,168
Rosemère	14,090	13,958	+0.9%	10.68	4.12	1,319	3,420
Sainte-Anne-des-Plaines	15,221	14,421	+5.5%	93.44	36.08	163	422
Sainte-Thérèse	26,533	25,989	+2.1%	9.48	3.66	2,799	7,249
Total	163,632	157,103	+4.2%	206.52	79.74	792	2,052

Canada Census Mother Tongue - Thérèse-de-Blainville, Quebec
Census	Total	French			English			French & English			Other		
Year	Responses	Count	Trend	Pop %	Count	Trend	Pop %	Count	Trend	Pop %	Count	Trend	Pop %
2021	161,370	130,925	▼2.17%	81.13%	7,785	▲16.45%	4.8%	2,750	▲74.6%	1.7%	17,135	▲38.35%	10.61%
2016	155,865	133,825	▼0.11%	85.85%	6,685	▲6.96%	4.28%	1,575	▲22.44%	1.01%	12,385	▲22.44%	7.95%
2011	154,144	133,980	▲5.71%	86.91%	6,250	▲5.57%	4.05%	1,355	▲27.83%	0.87%	10,115	▲18.51%	6.56%
2006	143,370	126,740	▲9.40%	89.09%	5,920	▲4.96%	4.12%	1,060	▲30.86%	0.73%	8,535	▲25.24%	5.95%
2001	130,514	115,850	▲9.42%	88.76%	5,640	▲0.06%	4.32%	810	▼16.49%	0.62%	6,815	▲31.5%	5.22%
1996	119,240	105,870	n/a	88.78%	5,605	n/a	4.7%	970	n/a	0.81%	5,190	n/a	4.35%

== Transportation ==
=== Access Routes ===
Highways and numbered routes that run through the municipality, including external routes that start or finish at the county border:

- Autoroutes
  - A-13
  - A-15 (TCH)
  - A-640
- Principal Highways
  - R-117
- Secondary Highways
  - R-335
  - R-344
- External Routes
  - None

== See also ==
- List of regional county municipalities and equivalent territories in Quebec
