= Sainte-Anne-des-Plaines =

- City
- Sainte-Anne-des-Plaines
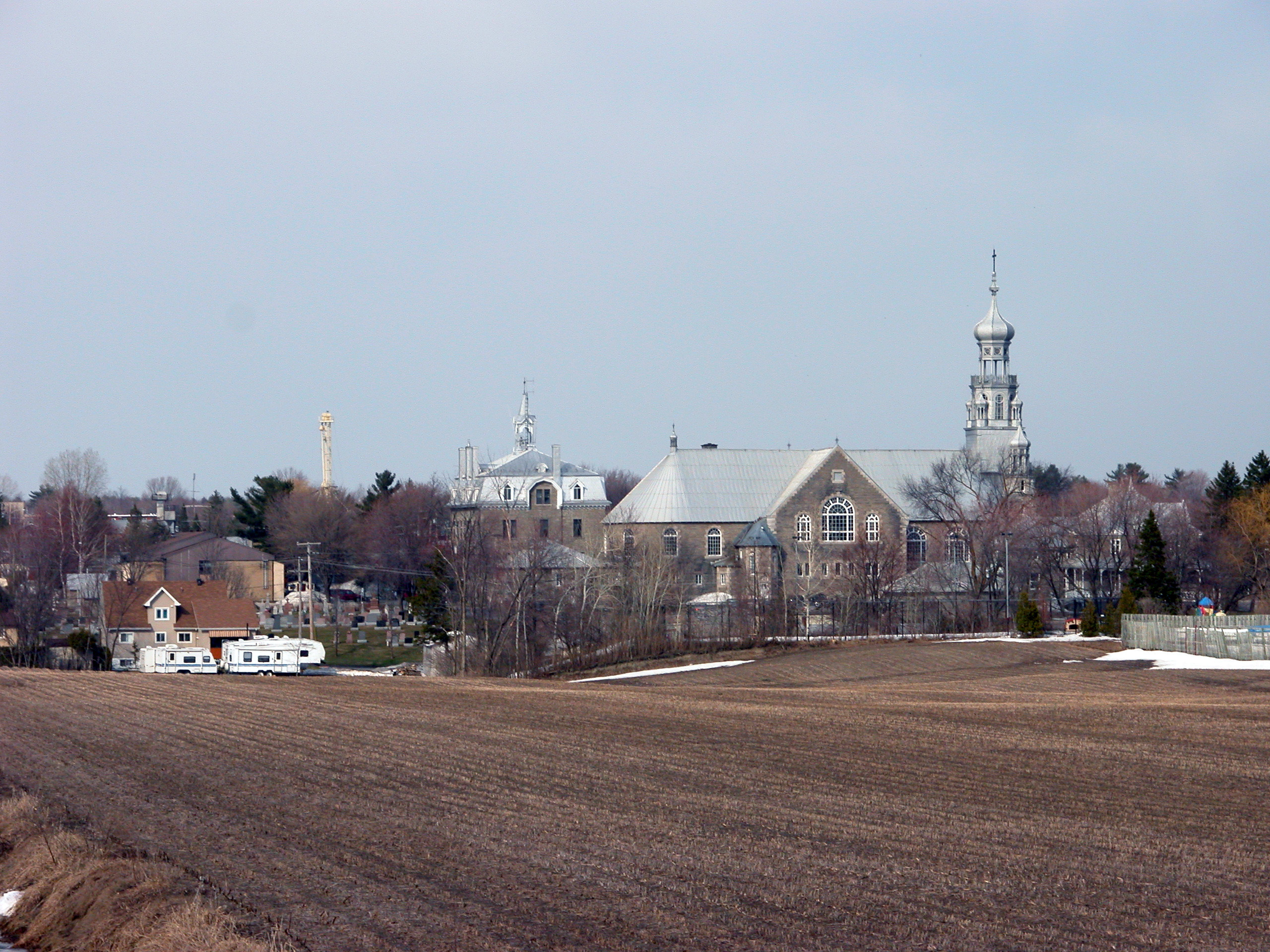
- Sainte-Anne-des-Plaines in spring

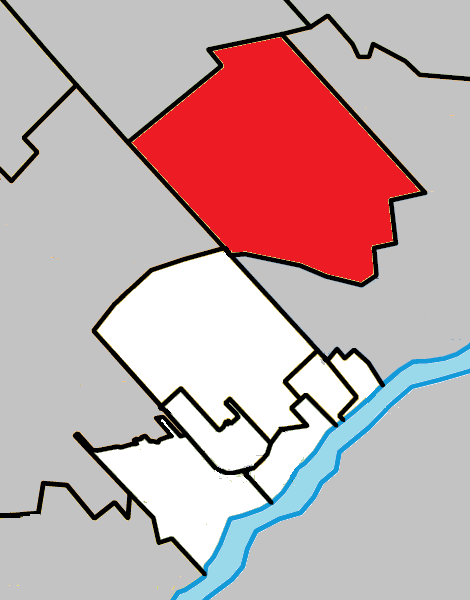
- Location within Thérèse-De Blainville RCM.

- Location in central Quebec.
- Coordinates: 45°46′N 73°49′W
- Country: Canada
- Province: Quebec
- Region: Laurentides
- RCM: Thérèse-De Blainville
- Constituted: July 1, 1855

Government
  - Mayor: Jean-René Labelle
  - Federal riding: Mirabel
  - Prov. riding: Blainville

Area
  - City: 94.40 km^{2} (36.45 sq mi)
  - Land: 93.44 km^{2} (36.08 sq mi)
  - Urban: 4.07 km^{2} (1.57 sq mi)

Population (2021)
  - City: 15,221
  - Density: 162.9/km^{2} (422/sq mi)
  - Urban: 11,269
  - Urban density: 2,768.8/km^{2} (7,171/sq mi)
  - Pop 2016–2021: ▲5.5%
- Time zone: UTC−5 (EST)
  - Summer (DST): UTC−4 (EDT)
- Postal code(s): J5N
- Area codes: 450 and 579
- Highways: R-335
- Website: www.ville.ste-anne-des-plaines.qc.ca

Sainte-Anne-des-Plaines (French pronunciation: [sɛ̃t an de plɛn]) is a city in southwestern Quebec, Canada, 40 kilometres (25 mi) northwest of the city of Montreal in the Thérèse-De Blainville Regional County Municipality, in the region of Laurentides. Its population was 14,990 during the census of 2014.

The city has the Sainte-Anne-des-Plaines Complex of the Correctional Service of Canada, which includes the Regional Reception Centre (multi-level security), housing Special Handling Unit (SHU), Canada's highest-security unit; Sainte-Anne-des-Plaines Institution (maximum security), and the Regional Mental Health Centre (multi). It also has the Archambault Institution. Sainte-Anne-Des-Plaines got city status in 1987

== Geography ==
=== Communities ===
- Domaine des Cyprès - located along Montee Morel with residents north of rue Robert located within Camping Sainte-Anne. Golf Le Champetre located along east side of Morel.
- Domaine Normandie - located along Boulevard Normandie south of Rang LePage the small community is centred around Lac de Normandie
- Lac des Plaines - located northwest of La Plaine and centred around Lac des Plaines. Homes along the lake are mostly trailers with fixed homes to the north. Large forest area found just north of the community.
- Lepage - centred at Rang Lepage and Highway 335 and located just south of Sainte-Anne-des-Plaines.
- Sainte-Anne-des-Plaines - largest of the communities along Highway 335. Commercial and other critical services provided here.

=== Climate ===
Sainte-Anne-des-Plaines has a warm summer humid continental climate (Köppen climate classification Dfb) with warm or hot summers and cold winters the record low is -41 °C (-41 °F) on January 15, 1957 The highest temperature was 36 °C (97 °F) on August 1, 1975

== Demographics ==
In the 2021 Census of Population conducted by Statistics Canada, Sainte-Anne-des-Plaines had a population of 15,221 living in 5,882 of its 6,005 total private dwellings, a change of 5.5% from its 2016 population of 14,421. With a land area of 93.44 km^{2} (36.08 sq mi), it had a population density of 162.9/km^{2} (421.9/sq mi) in 2021.

== Education ==
The Commission scolaire de la Seigneurie-des-Mille-Îles (CSSMI) operates French-language schools.

- École primaire de l'Harmonie-Jeunesse
- École primaire des Moissons
- École primaire du Bois-Joli
- École secondaire du Harfang

Sir Wilfrid Laurier School Board operates the English-language public schools.

- Pierre Elliot Trudeau Elementary School in Blainville
- Rosemère High School in Rosemère

== See also ==
- Saint Pierre River (Mascouche), a river
- Rivière des Mille Îles, a river
