= Bois-des-Filion =

- City
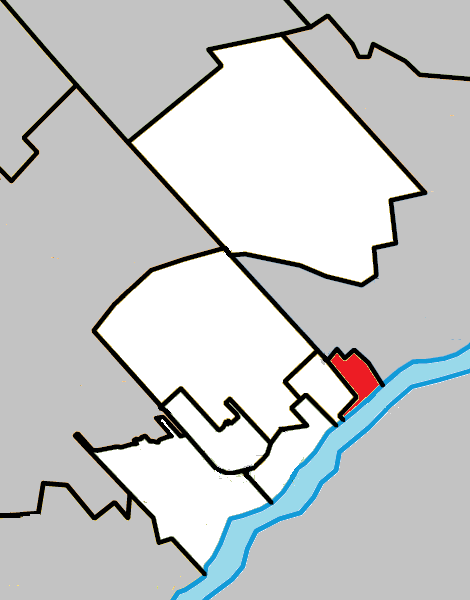
- Location within Thérèse-De Blainville RCM.

- Location in central Quebec.
- Coordinates: 45°40′N 73°45′W
- Country: Canada
- Province: Quebec
- Region: Laurentides
- RCM: Thérèse-De Blainville
- Constituted: January 1, 1949

Government
  - Mayor: Charles Bélanger
  - Federal riding: Thérèse-De Blainville
  - Prov. riding: Blainville

Area
  - Total: 4.90 km^{2} (1.89 sq mi)
  - Land: 4.36 km^{2} (1.68 sq mi)

Population (2021)
  - Total: 10,159
  - Density: 2,327.8/km^{2} (6,029/sq mi)
  - Pop 2016–2021: ▲5.4%
- Time zone: UTC−05:00 (EST)
  - Summer (DST): UTC−04:00 (EDT)
- Postal code(s): J6Z 1H1
- Area codes: 450 and 579
- Highways A-640: R-335; R-344
- Website: ville.bois-des-filion.qc.ca

Bois-des-Filion (French pronunciation: [bwa de filjɔ̃]) is an off-island suburb of Montreal, located in Quebec, Canada, to the north of Montreal.

Historically, hundreds of families annually travelled to this region seasonally to experience the maple forests; however, the tourist industry is currently a minor source of income for the city.

The primary language spoken by its citizens is French, and the primary source of employment is general manufacturing.

== Origin of the name ==
The name Filion is derived from the surname of Antoine Feuillon, a local carpenter who could neither read nor write, and thus was unable to correct any errors in the spelling of his name as the first records were kept. Antoine Feuillion was the son of Michel Feuillon, a captain of the Musketeers of the Guards during the reign of the "Sun King", Louis XIV before his immigration to New France.

This town is named Bois des Filion because of the beautiful maple woods bordering it; le bois being French for "the woods". When the city was newly founded, one had to follow a path through these woods and ford a small river to enter the city.

== History ==
This small town has a rich cultural history rooted in the legend of the lords, Céloron de Blainville and Lepage of Holy-Claire. Below are some important dates.

- 1684 - The first Filion migrates to Canada
- 1913 - The arrival of the Parish from the Abbot De Bray
- 1945 - An association of citizens is formed and the process of becoming an official city is begun
- 1949 - Bois-des-Filion becomes officially recognized as a city of Quebec and the first mayor is named, Joseph Germain.
- 1955 - The second largest cross in the province is erected on Notre-Dame hill to celebrate the 10 year anniversary since the first association of citizens was formed.
- 1980 - It became a municipality called Ville de Bois-des-Filion (City of Bois-des-Filion)

== Demographics ==
In the 2021 Census of Population conducted by Statistics Canada, Bois-des-Filion had a population of 10,159 living in 4,258 of its 4,370 total private dwellings, a change of 5.4% from its 2016 population of 9,636. With a land area of 4.36 km^{2} (1.68 sq mi), it had a population density of 2,330.0/km^{2} (6,034.8/sq mi) in 2021.

== Government ==
Time in office	Mayor
January 19, 1949 to July 16, 1951	Joseph Germain
July 16, 1951 to July 18, 1955	Alexandre Savaria
July 18, 1955 to July 23, 1956	Joseph Germain
August 1, 1956 to July 9, 1963	Émile Pigeon
July 9, 1963 to July 2, 1965	Paul Perron
July 2, 1965 to May 15, 1968	L. Van Coppenolle
May 15, 1968 to June 19, 1968	G. Arthur Aubertin
July 25, 1968 to October 27, 1974	Jean-Guy Roger
October 9, 1974 to November 6, 1977	Pierre Côté
November 6, 1977 to November 11, 1985	Guy Papineau
November 11, 1985 to November 7, 1993	Pierre Paquin
November 7, 1993 to November 5, 2017	Paul Larocque
November 5, 2017 to November, 2025	Gilles Blanchette
November 2025 to present	Charles Bélanger

== Education ==
The Commission scolaire de la Seigneurie-des-Mille-Îles (CSSMI) operates Francophone public schools. The territory has the following schools:

- École secondaire Rive-Nord
- École Le Rucher pavillon Félix-Leclerc

Most students are zoned to Le Rucher, secondaire Hubert-Maisonneuve in Rosemère (for lower secondary), and Rive-Nord (for upper secondary). Some are zoned to École Marie-Soleil-Tougas in Terrebonne, École Le Carrefour in Lorraine, and École secondaire du Harfang in Sainte-Anne-des-Plaines.

Sir Wilfrid Laurier School Board operates Anglophone public schools:

- McCaig Elementary School in Rosemère
- Rosemère High School in Rosemère

== Notable residents ==
- Terry Farnsworth (born 1942), Olympic judoka
- Isabelle Hayeur (born 1969), visual artist
- Serge Ménard (born 1941), politician
