= HydroSerre Mirabel =

Canadian hydroponics company

Hydroserre inc.
- Type: Agriculture, distributor
- Industry: hydroponic produce grower
- Founded: 1980
- Headquarters: Mirabel, Quebec
- Products: leaf lettuce, fresh herbs
- Brands: Mirabel
- Website: www.mirabel.qc.com

Hydroserre Mirabel is a Canadian company which grows hydroponic produce.

== History ==
The company was founded in 1987 with the construction of its first 30,000 sq. m. (300,000 sq. ft) greenhouse, following an R&D project conducted from 1980 to 1986. After a series of expansions, the company currently operates a total greenhouse area of 72,850 sq. m. (784,000 sq. ft.). From 1995 to 2006, Mirabel's development is ensured by the financial support of the Solidarity Fund QFL.

In the first decade of 2000, the partnership and senior management underwent some changes. Sylvain Terrault and Martin Desrochers became equal shareholders of the company.

Mirabel announced in 2007, that it would construct a $40 million greenhouse facility in Livingston, Tennessee its first greenhouse in the United States.

In 2008, Sylvain Terrault acquired all shares of the company. In 2009, Hydroserre acquired a greenhouse in the Bois-Francs and, in 2010, create a co-enterprise with The Serre Lefort.
