= Lake-of-Two-Mountains High School =

School in Deux-Montagnes, Quebec, Canada

Coordinates: 45.5411°N 73.9136°W

Lake-of-Two-Mountains High School (LTM; French: École secondaire Lake-of-Two-Mountains) is an Anglophone public high school in Deux-Montagnes, Quebec in the Laurentides region. It is a part of the Sir Wilfrid Laurier School Board.

The school's service area includes Deux Montagnes, Kanesatake, southern portions of Mirabel, Oka, Pointe-Calumet, Saint-Eustache, Saint-Placide, Ste-Marthe-sur-le-Lac, and St-Joseph-du-Lac. As of 2014 55 students from Kanesatake choose to attend Lake of Two Mountains.

== History ==
Before secularization of the Quebec school system, this was a Protestant school, and it was covering the English-speaking population. In 1972 the school received an influx of Catholic English-speaking students, because the North Island Regional School Board stopped accepting English-speaking Catholics at the high school level.

The current campus was built in 1983, replacing the previous facility. The previous facility was in the center of Deux Montagnes, and it was scheduled to become an elementary school for French-speaking children after the school moved.

== Programs ==
As of 2005 the school has the "16 Plus" alternative education program for students at risk of dropping out of high school altogether; they may receive a life skills diploma, but not a full high school diploma, if they graduate from this program.
