= Académie Sainte-Thérèse =

Coordinates: 45.6461°N 73.7749°W

Académie Sainte-Thérèse is a French-language private school in the Laurentides region of Quebec with its headquarters in Sainte-Thérèse and two campuses: Campus Rose-DeAngelis in Rosemère serves preschool (5 years old) through the fifth year of elementary school, while Campus Jacques-About in Sainte-Thérèse serves the 6th year of elementary school through the 5th (final) year of secondary school.
