= Saint-Eustache, Quebec =

Saint-Eustache
- City
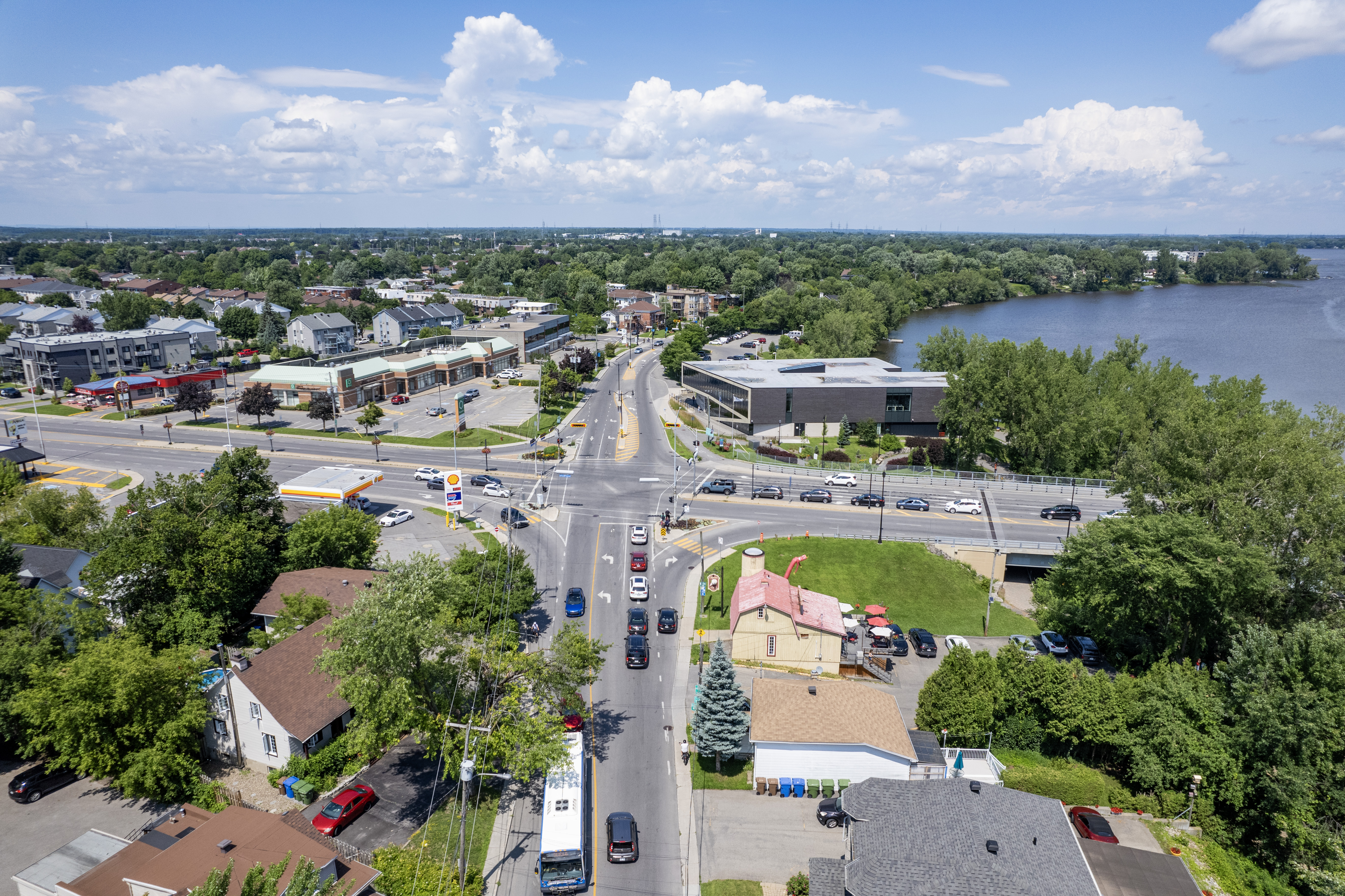
- Aerial view of Saint-Eustache

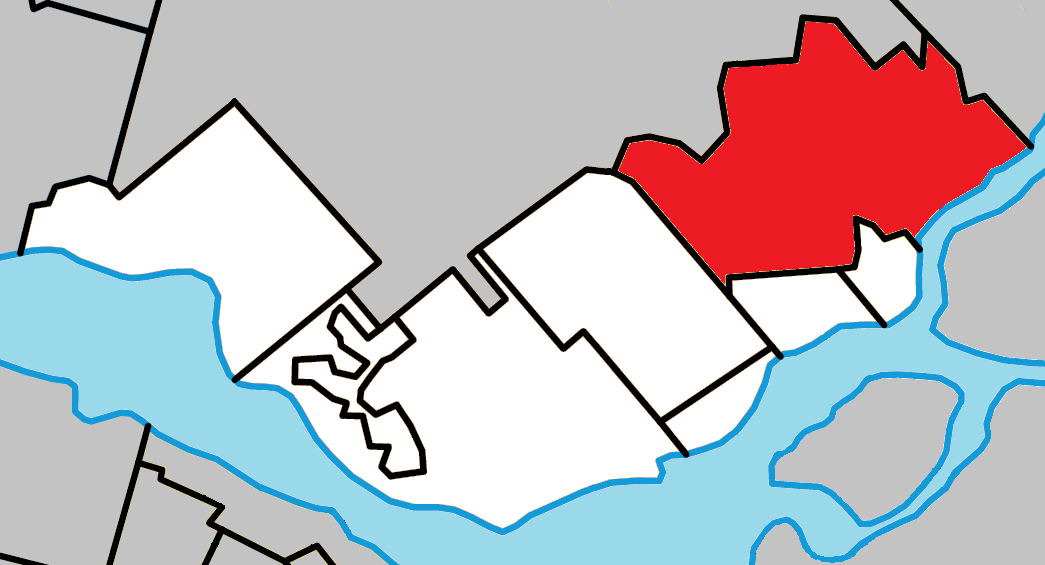
- Location within Deux-Montagnes RCM

- Location in central Quebec
- Coordinates: 45°34′12″N 073°54′00″W
- Country: Canada
- Province: Quebec
- Region: Laurentides
- RCM: Deux-Montagnes
- Settled: 1770
- Constituted: January 15, 1972

Government
  - Mayor: Marc Lamarre
  - Federal riding: Rivière-des-Mille-Îles
  - Prov. riding: Deux-Montagnes

Area
  - Total: 72.60 km^{2} (28.03 sq mi)
  - Land: 70.51 km^{2} (27.22 sq mi)

Population (2021)
  - Total: 45,276
  - Density: 642.1/km^{2} (1,663/sq mi)
  - Pop 2016-2021: ▲2.9%
  - Dwellings: 19,396
- Time zone: UTC−05:00 (EST)
  - Summer (DST): UTC−04:00 (EDT)
- Postal code(s): J7P, J7R
- Area codes: 450 and 579
- Highways A-640: R-148; R-344
- Website: www.saint-eustache.ca

Saint-Eustache (French pronunciation: [sɛ̃t‿østaʃ]) is an off-island suburb of Montreal, in western Quebec, Canada, west of Montreal on the north shore of the Rivière des Mille Îles. It is located 35 km (22 mi) northwest of Montreal.

== History ==
The city was founded in 1770 and was incorporated in 1835.

The Battle of Saint-Eustache in the Lower Canada Rebellion was fought there on December 14, 1837. The rebels were defeated, and the town was burnt. The church was fully rebuilt after the burning except for the front facade.

Saint-Eustache was home to the Autodrome Saint-Eustache from 1965 to 2019.

== Demographics ==
In the 2021 Census of Population conducted by Statistics Canada, Saint-Eustache had a population of 45,276 living in 18,958 of its 19,396 total private dwellings, a change of 2.9% from its 2016 population of 44,008. With a land area of 70.51 km^{2} (27.22 sq mi), it had a population density of 642.1/km^{2} (1,663.1/sq mi) in 2021.

Population trend:

- Population in 2021: 45,276 (2016 to 2021 population change: 2.9%)
- Population in 2016: 44,008 (2011 to 2016 population change: -0.3%)
- Population in 2011: 44,154 (2006 to 2011 population change: 4.9%)
- Population in 2006: 42,062 (2001 to 2006 population change: 4.2%)
- Population in 2001: 40,378
- Population in 1996: 39,848
- Population in 1991: 37,278
- Population in 1986: 32,226
- Population in 1981: 29,771
- Population in 1976: 21,248
- Population in 1971: 9,479
- Population in 1966: 7,319
- Population in 1961: 5,463
- Population in 1956: 3,740
- Population in 1951: 2,615
- Population in 1941: 1,564
- Population in 1931: 1,187
- Population in 1921: 1,098
- Population in 1911: 996
- Population in 1901: 1,079
- Population in 1891: 960
- Population in 1881: 814
- Population in 1871: 858
- Population in 1861: 915
- Population in 1851: 784

Mother tongue (as of 2021) :

- French as first language: 83.9%
- Other as first language: 8.7%
- English as first language: 4.2%
- English and French as first language: 1.5%

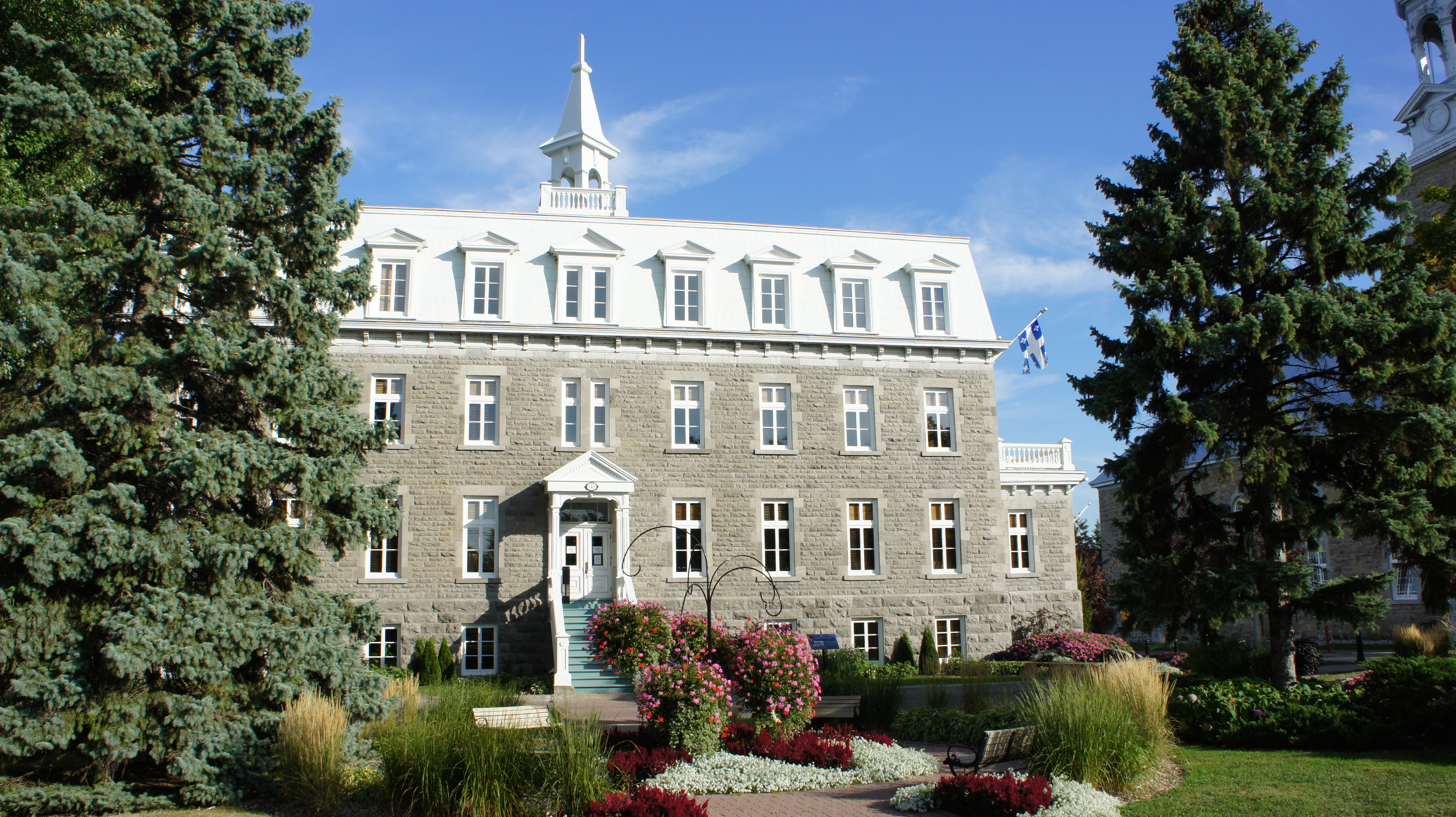
Saint-Eustache city hall

Canada Census Mother Tongue - Saint-Eustache, Quebec
Census	Total	French			English			French & English			Other		
Year	Responses	Count	Trend	Pop %	Count	Trend	Pop %	Count	Trend	Pop %	Count	Trend	Pop %
2021	45,000	37,755	▼2.92%	83.9%	1,880	▲15.69%	4.2%	680	▲61.90%	1.5%	3.920	▲49.90%	8.7%
2016	43,915	38,890	▼1.77%	88.6%	1,625	▼0.61%	3.7%	420	▲25.37%	1.0%	2,615	▲37.27%	6.0%
2011	43,670	39,590	▲2.36%	90.7%	1,635	▲11.6%	3.7%	335	▲31.37%	0.8%	1,905	▲60.08%	4.4%
2006	41,595	38,680	▲3.28%	93.0%	1,465	▲0.69%	3.5%	255	▼28.17%	0.6%	1,190	▲75%	2.9%
2001	39,940	37,455	▲1.74%	93.8%	1,455	▼7%	3.0%	355	▲5.98%	0.9%	680	▲4.61%	1.7%
1996	39,515	36,815	n/a	93,2%	1,565	n/a	4.0%	335	n/a	0.9%	650	n/a	1.7%

== Transport ==
There used to be a train station in Saint-Eustache from 1882 to 1940. It operated service to and from Sainte-Thérèse.

== Education ==
The Commission scolaire de la Seigneurie-des-Mille-Îles (CSSMI) operates French-language public schools.

The Sir Wilfrid Laurier School Board operates English-language schools. Lake of Two Mountains High School in Deux-Montagnes serves the community. Mountainview Elementary School and Saint Jude Elementary School, both in Deux-Montagnes, also serve the community.
