= Sainte-Thérèse, Quebec =

Sainte-Thérèse
- City
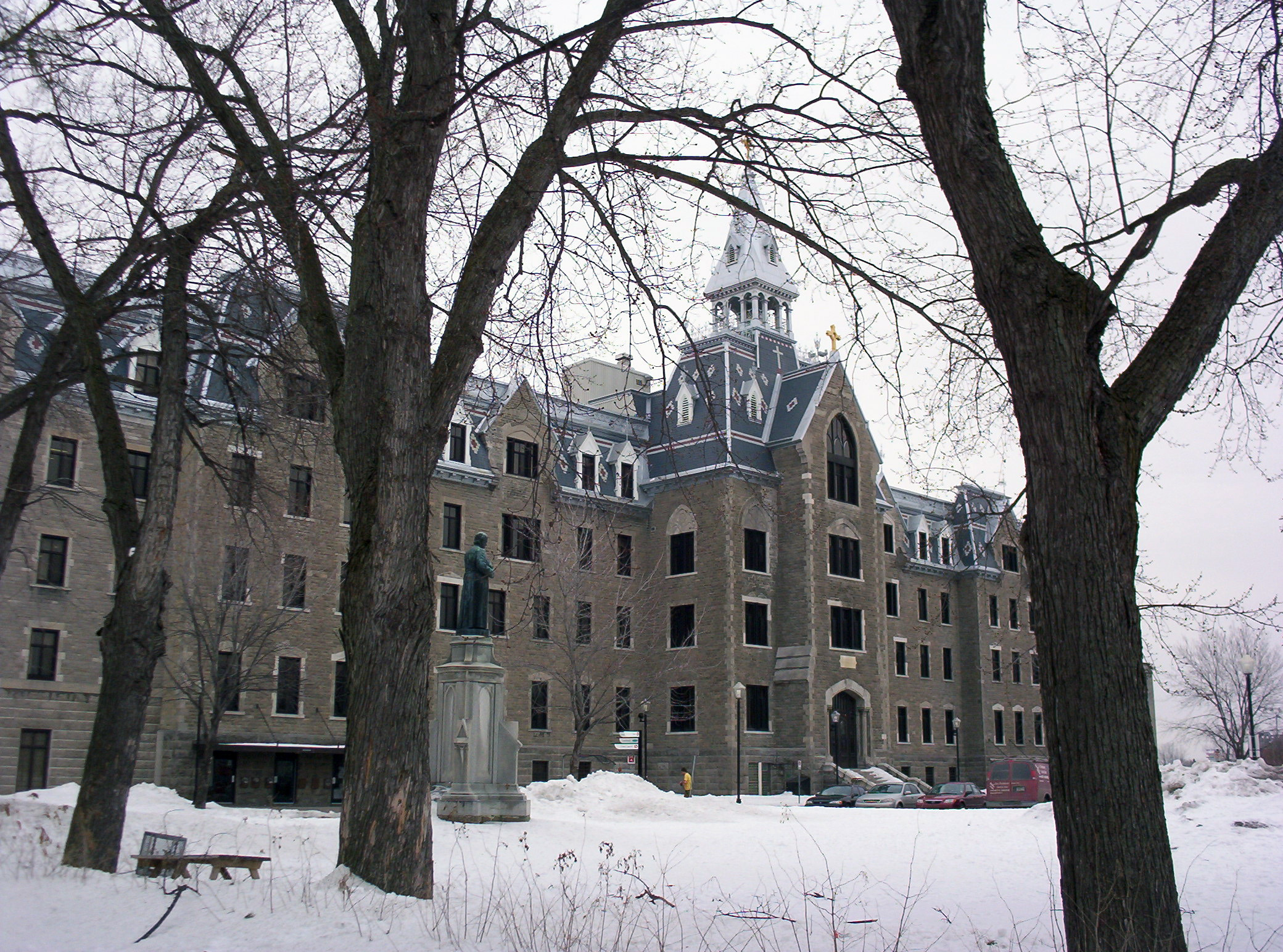
- The old Séminaire de Sainte-Thérèse

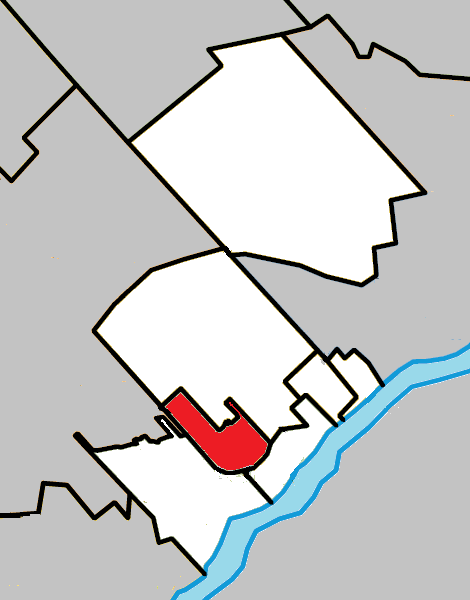
- Location within Thérèse-De Blainville RCM.

- Location in central Quebec.
- Coordinates: 45°38′25″N 73°50′35″W
- Country: Canada
- Province: Quebec
- Region: Laurentides
- RCM: Thérèse-De Blainville
- Constituted: June 1, 1849

Government
  - Mayor: Christian Charron
  - Federal riding: Thérèse-De Blainville
  - Prov. riding: Groulx

Area
  - Total: 9.40 km^{2} (3.63 sq mi)
  - Land: 9.58 km^{2} (3.70 sq mi)
- There is an apparent contradiction between two authoritative sources

Population (2011)
  - Total: 26,025
  - Density: 2,716.1/km^{2} (7,035/sq mi)
  - Pop 2006–2011: ▲3.2%
- Time zone: UTC−05:00 (EST)
  - Summer (DST): UTC−04:00 (EDT)
- Postal code(s): J7E
- Area codes: 450 and 579
- Highways A-640: R-117
- Website: www.sainte-therese.ca

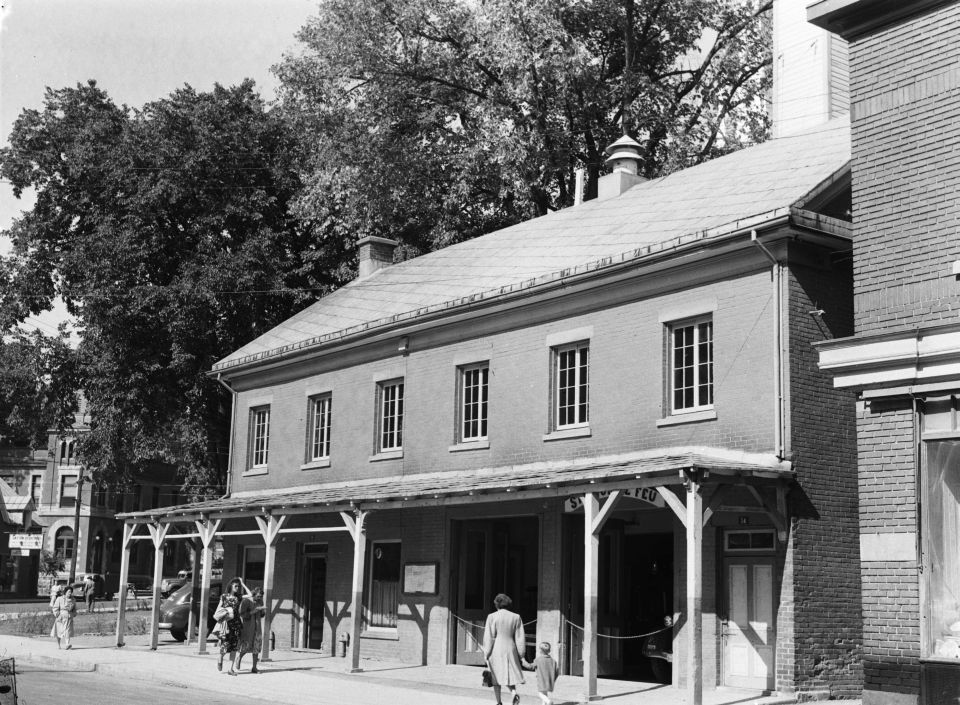
The city hall of Sainte-Thérèse, September 28, 1948.

Sainte-Thérèse (French pronunciation: [sɛ̃t teʁɛz]) is an off-island suburb northwest of Montreal, in southwestern Quebec, Canada, in the Thérèse-De Blainville Regional County Municipality.

The town is mostly known as a home for heavy industry, but it is also a centre of recreational and tourist activities. It is near the southern limit of a web of cross-country ski trails which meander through the Laurentides. Heading north, it is possible to undertake several nature-filled days of skiing towards major resort centres such as Mont-Tremblant.

During the summer, many of the ski trails are used as dedicated bicycle paths, making it possible to undertake day-long or week-long cycling excursions through unspoiled areas, from one resort area to another, without sharing the right of way with motorized vehicles.

== History ==
On September 23, 1683, in recognition of his military services, Joseph-Antoine Le Febvre de La Barre (governor of New France) granted the seigneury of the Thousand Islands to Michel-Sidrac Dugué de Boisbriand. The exploitation of the seigneury of 9 square miles began in 1714 when Marie-Thérèse Dugué de Boisbriand and her husband Charles Piot de Langloiserie took possession of the seigneury. In 1715, Langloiserie died and his wife, not having the energy to take care of the work of colonizing the land, left the Seigneurie abandoned.

It was not until 1743 when Suzanne de Langloiserie and her husband Jean-Baptiste Céloron de Blainville took possession of the land. On October 15, 1789, Marie-Anne Thérèse de Blainville, to whom the Seigneury of Blainville was bequeathed jointly with her sister Marie-Hypolite de Blainville, inaugurated the parish of Sainte-Thérèse-d'Ávila. On June 1, 1849, the Village of Sainte-Thérèse was created following a request from Louis Marteau, Paul Filiatrault and Joseph-Benjamin Lachaîne to the Terrebonne County Parish Council. The Village will officially become a Town in 1916.

== Economy ==
The city was for several decades the home of Sicard Industries, the biggest maker of snow blowers in the world.

There is also a Paccar plant that manufactures light and medium-duty Kenworth and Peterbilt trucks.

Home and garden company, Botanix, originate from Sainte-Thérèse. Founders and brothers, Guy and Wilfred Dion, started a business that would become Pavage Dion and Centre du Jardin Dion. Groupe Rona stepped in and expanded the company to become one of the largest landscaping and flower company in Québec.

Sainte-Thérèse formerly had a number of piano factories, including Pianos Lesage.

Before the General Motors plant arrival in 1966 (in neighbouring Ste-Thérèse Ouest, now Boisbriand), Agricultural and equipment company Machineries Dion was the biggest employer of the region. Steel combines were designed and produced from 1940 and beyond. Steel foundry, state of the art workshop, cast iron parts, and ingenious thinking made Machineries Dion a leader in the equipment market. Inventors of the first pull-type forage harvester in the world with macerating rolls for hay and corn (invented in the 1970s, which would later become important in a Claas vs John Deere proprietary patent lawsuit). After the initial success, more divisions would emerge; concrete silos, maple syrup extraction equipment, and agricultural technology development soon followed.

== Transportation ==
Sainte-Thérèse is served by the Sainte-Thérèse commuter rail station on the Exo (Réseau de transport métropolitain) Saint-Jérôme line. Local bus service is provided by CIT Laurentides.

== Demographics ==
In the 2021 Census of Population conducted by Statistics Canada, Sainte-Thérèse had a population of 26,533 living in 12,686 of its 13,202 total private dwellings, a change of 2.1% from its 2016 population of 25,989. With a land area of 9.48 km^{2} (3.66 sq mi), it had a population density of 2,798.8/km^{2} (7,249.0/sq mi) in 2021.

Canada Census Mother Tongue - Ste-Therese, Quebec
Census	Total	French			English			French & English			Other		
Year	Responses	Count	Trend	Pop %	Count	Trend	Pop %	Count	Trend	Pop %	Count	Trend	Pop %
2016	25,360	23,295	▼0.68%	91.85%	710	▲1.42%	2.79%	240	▲0.9%	0.94%	1,340	▲24.65%	5.28%
2011	25,570	23,455	▲3.85%	91.73%	700	▼25.92%	2.74%	220	▲25.71%	0.86%	1,075	▼8.91%	4.2%
2006	24,885	22,585	▲2.64%	90.76%	945	▲23.52%	3.79%	175	▲16.67%	0.70%	1,180	▲25.53%	4.74%
2001	23,865	22,005	▲3.52%	92.21%	765	▼6.13%	3.2%	150	▼37.5%	0.63%	940	▲12.57%	3.94%
1996	23,175	21,255	n/a	91.71%	815	n/a	3.51%	240	n/a	1.03%	835	n/a	3.60%

== Education ==
The Commission scolaire de la Seigneurie-des-Mille-Îles (CSSMI) operates Francophone public schools.

- École Polyvalente Sainte-Thérèse
- École secondaire Saint-Gabriel
- École Arthur-Vaillancourt
- École du Trait-d'Union
- École Le Tandem
- École Saint-Pierre
- École Terre-Soleil

Some students are zoned to École Plateau Saint-Louis or to École de la Renaissance in Blainville and some are zoned to École secondaire Jean-Jacques-Rousseau in Boisbriand.

Sir Wilfrid Laurier School Board operates Anglophone public schools:

- Pierre Elliot Trudeau Elementary School (serves a portion) in Blainville
- McCaig Elementary School (serves a portion) in Rosemère
- Rosemère High School in Rosemère

There is a French-language private school, Académie Sainte-Thérèse, which has its secondary school campus here.
