= Rosemère =

- City
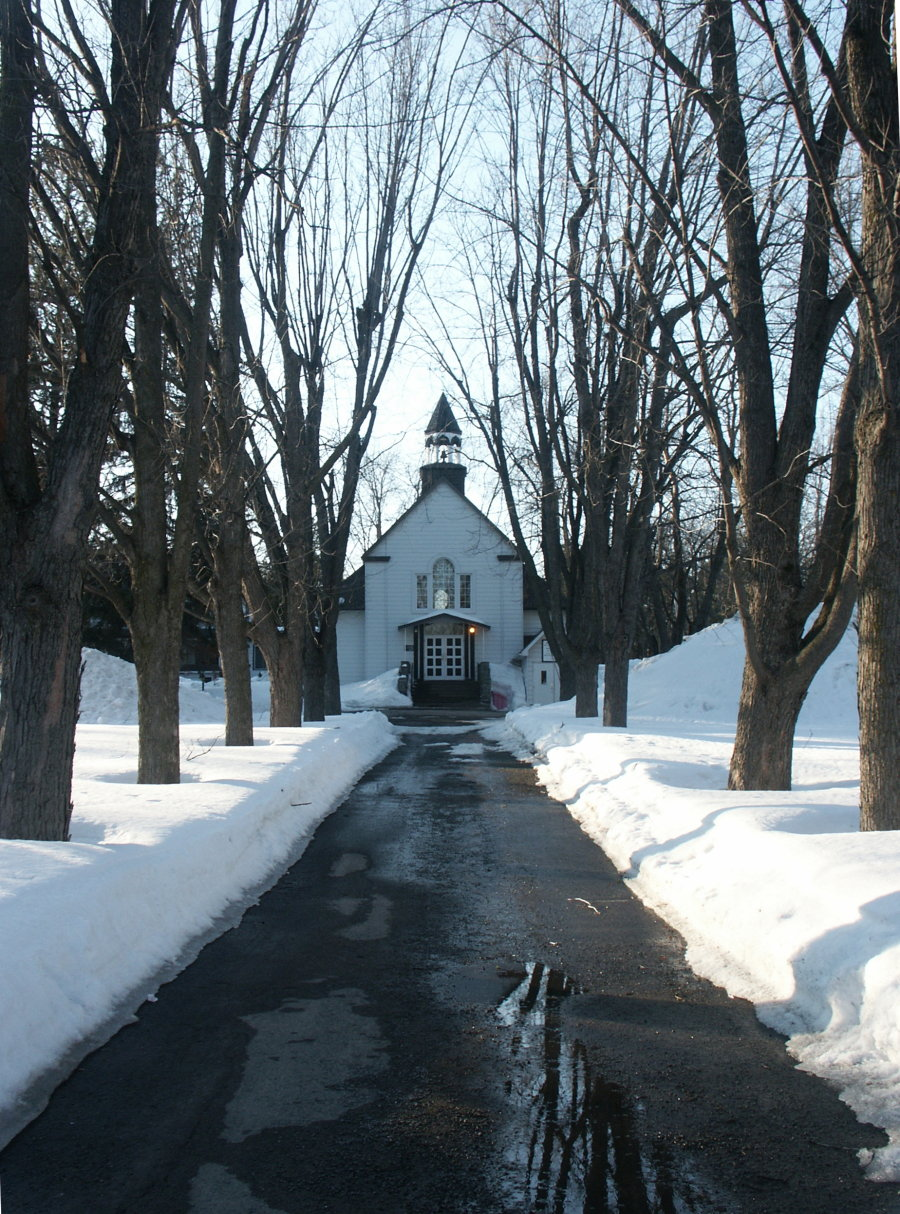
- Rosemère church.

- Coat of arms
- Motto: "Vivat floreat crestat" (Latin for, "Live, Bloom and Grow")
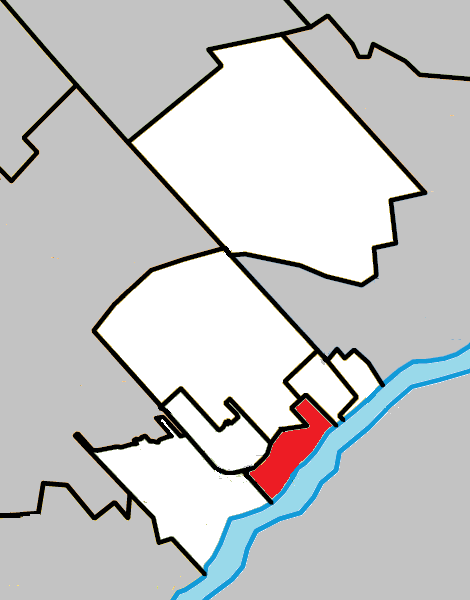
- Location within Thérèse-De Blainville RCM.

- Location in central Quebec.
- Coordinates: 45°38′13″N 73°48′00″W
- Country: Canada
- Province: Quebec
- Region: Laurentides
- RCM: Thérèse-De Blainville
- Constituted: January 1, 1947

Government
  - Mayor: Marie-Elaine Pitre
  - Federal riding: Rivière-des-Mille-Îles
  - Prov. riding: Groulx

Area
  - Total: 12.20 km^{2} (4.71 sq mi)
  - Land: 10.77 km^{2} (4.16 sq mi)
- Elevation: 29 m (95 ft)

Population (2011)
  - Total: 14,294
  - Density: 1,326.9/km^{2} (3,437/sq mi)
  - Pop 2006–2011: ▲0.9%
- Time zone: UTC– 05:00 (EST)
  - Summer (DST): UTC– 04:00 (EDT)
- Postal code(s): J6Z, J7A
- Area codes: 450 and 579
- Highways A-640: R-117; R-344
- Website: www.ville.rosemere.qc.ca

Rosemère (French pronunciation: [ʁozmɛʁ]) is an affluent suburb of Montreal, in southwestern Quebec, Canada on the north shore of the Rivière des Mille Îles in the Thérèse-De Blainville Regional County Municipality. The town is noted for its green look, due to the high density of trees. Some wooded areas in the town have been left intact as the town has grown around them. Homes are mostly upscale, varying from renovated cottages to unique character homes. It is almost entirely residential, with no significant industries. Boulevard Curé-Labelle, the town's main commercial artery, is lined up by suburban shops and shopping malls, the largest of which is Place Rosemère.

Its most famous resident is likely Alexandre Bilodeau, who became the first Canadian athlete to win an Olympic gold medal on Canadian soil. He won the men's moguls event at the 2010 Winter Olympics in Vancouver, British Columbia.

== Demographics ==
In the 2021 Census of Population conducted by Statistics Canada, Rosemère had a population of 14,090 living in 5,249 of its 5,340 total private dwellings, a change of 0.9% from its 2016 population of 13,958. With a land area of 10.68 km^{2} (4.12 sq mi), it had a population density of 1,319.3/km^{2} (3,416.9/sq mi) in 2021.

Canada Census Mother Tongue – Rosemère, Quebec
Census	Total	French			English			French & English			Other		
Year	Responses	Count	Trend	Pop %	Count	Trend	Pop %	Count	Trend	Pop %	Count	Trend	Pop %
2021	14,090	10,025	▼3.18%	71.15%	1,730	▲24.4%	12.27%	340	▲61.9%	1.52%	1,725	▲24.10%	12.24%
2016	13,800	10,355	▼3.4%	75.04%	1,390	▼23.84%	10.07%	210	▲10.52%	1.52%	1,390	▲9.49%	10.07%
2011	14 135	10,720	▲0.03%	75.84%	1,825	▼10.68%	12.91%	190	▼13.15%	1.35%	1,270	▲14.56%	9.06%
2006	14,010	10,685	▲5.66%	76.26%	2,020	▼3.57%	14.41%	215	▲20.93%	1.53%	1,085	▲24%	7.74%
2001	13,215	10,080	▲12.9%	76.27%	2,095	▼4.3%	15.85%	170	▼5.5%	1.24%	875	▲8.5%	6.62%
1996	12 025	8,770	n/a	72.93%	2,190	n/a	18.21%	180	n/a	1.49%	805	n/a	6.69%

== History ==
The area that would become Rosemère was first settled in 1714, with the establishment of the Mille-Îles Seigneury. By 1780, the seigneury was well established, with large tracts of land under cultivation. Rosemère was named by J.P. Withers, of the Canadian Pacific Railway, who moved to the area in 1880. At first he called his new home "Rose", after the many wild roses growing there. Later he added "mere", an old English word for a lake. The Rivière des Mille Îles is wide and has the appearance of a lake at this location, so the English meaning would be "lake of roses". After the town's incorporation, documents were forwarded to Quebec City, and an accent was added to the middle 'e', according to statements by residents. In French, the name does not mean "Mother of Roses", which would be said "Mère des Roses" in French. The town's name has no sensible meaning in French, though in typical Canadian fashion, the name has become bilingual.

In the first half of the last century, Rosemère had several natural sandy beaches on the Rivière des Mille Îles and many cottages along the shoreline that were only used during the summer. These beaches fell into disuse in the early 1960s because of pollution. A majority of the year-round residents were francophone and many of the summer-only residents were anglophone. After World War II, Rosemère was transformed into a bedroom community of Montreal with the construction of homes in farmland and forested areas northwest of Grande Côte. By 1964, 65% of Rosemère's residents were anglophone. While the French and English residents of Rosemère have always enjoyed the ambiance of the area in harmony, the English population has declined over the years to today's 16% (2001 Canadian Census), but has since climbed to 19.89% (2006 Canadian Census).

The French- and English-speaking communities of Rosemère have cohabitated for a long time, each of them leaving its own mark and institutions. In 1992, a public consultation process confirmed the desire of residents to preserve the Town of Rosemère's bilingual status.

== Education ==
The Commission scolaire de la Seigneurie-des-Mille-Îles (CSSMI) operates French-language schools in the city.

- École secondaire Hubert-Maisonneuve (lower secondary)
- École primaire Alpha
- École primaire Val-des-Ormes

Some students are zoned to École primaire du Ruisselet in Lorraine and École primaire de Fontainebleau in Blainville. Upper secondary students are zoned to École Polyvalente Sainte-Thérèse in Sainte-Thérèse or to École secondaire Rive-Nord in Bois-des-Filion.

Furthermore, the administration building for the Sir Wilfrid Laurier School Board which operates English-language schools found in the Laval, Laurentides and Lanaudière regions is located in Rosemère. It neighbours one of its secondary schools, Rosemère High School which also houses the English school board's educational and complementary services. The board also operates McCaig Elementary School, which is located in very close proximity to the high school, as it is located on the same street. McCaig and Rosemère High serve all areas of the municipality.

The francophone private school Académie Sainte-Thérèse has a campus in Rosemère. Externat Sacré-Cœur is also in the town.

=== Municipal chronology ===
Population history, according to the Institut de la statistique du Québec:

- 12,186 inhabitants (as of 1996);
- 12,675 (as of 1997);
- 13,050 (as of 1998);
- 13,287 (as of 1999);
- 13,497 (as of 2000);
- 13,692 (as of 2001);
- 13,933 (as of 2002);
- 14,198 (as of 2003);
- 14,340 (as of 2004);
- 14,271 (as of 2005);
- 14,276 (as of 2006);
- 14,281 (as of 2007);
- 14,188 (as of 2008);
- 14,294 (as of 2011).

== Transportation ==
Rosemère is connected to Montreal's Lucien-L'Allier station by commuter rail via the Rosemère station of the Exo (Réseau de transport métropolitain) Saint-Jérôme line. Local bus service is provided by Exo's Laurentides section.

=== Regional ===
The city of Rosemère is part of the following regional boundaries:

- Administrative region: Laurentides;
- MRC: Thérèse-De Blainville;
- Provincial electoral district: Groulx;
- Federal electoral district: Rivière-des-Milles-Iles.

== See also ==
- List of anglophone communities in Quebec
- Rivière aux Chiens (rivière des Mille Îles), a river
