= Rosemere High School =

Rosemère High School

Location
- 190 Bd Curé-Labelle; Rosemère, Québec; Canada; 45.6471°N 73.7857°W

Information
- Type: Public and High school
- Established: 1963
- School board: Sir Wilfrid Laurier School Board
- Principal: Karen Lorenz
- Grades: Secondary 1 to 5
- Enrollment: 1200
- Colours: Green and white
- Athletics: Football, soccer, hockey, and basketball
- Mascot: Viking
- Team name: Raiders
- Newspaper: Paper Cut
- Alumni name: Michael Gallo
- Website: rhs.swlauriersb.qc.ca

Rosemere High School (RHS, French: École secondaire Rosemère) was built in 1962 of the Sir Wilfrid Laurier School Board is a high school located in the town of Rosemère, Québec, Canada. It is housed in a two-story structure with enrollment of approximately 1,200 students.

The building is adjacent to the board headquarters. The school campus itself houses the board's Educational Services and Complementary Services Centre.

Rosemère High School students were required to follow a specific dress code for both magistral and physical education classes. However, this dress code was removed in the 2018 school year. A dress code for physical education is loosely enforced.

== History ==
It was previously Rosemere Protestant High School controlled by the Protestant Regional School Board of North Island. In 1967 this district and Commission scolaire regional Mille Isles, a Catholic school district, made an agreement to send all English speaking students to Rosemere Protestant High and French speaking students to Mille Isles Regional Catholic High School, regardless of religious background. At the time Quebec school districts were divided among religious lines instead of language.

In 1971 the school received a number of French-speaking students who wished to learn English to a higher degree. At the time such was allowed in Quebec.

== Attendance zones ==
- In the north: Blainville, Sainte-Anne-des-Plaines, La Plaine, Mascouche, and Terrebonne.
- In the south: Rivière des Mille Îles.
- In the west: Boisbriand and Mirabel: Domaine Vert.
- In the east: Repentigny and Le Gardeur.

== School sports ==
There are currently 11 sport programs at RHS:

Program	Sport
Boys & Girls	Hockey
Boys & Girls	Soccer
Boys	Football
Boys & Girls	Basketball
Boys & Girls	Volleyball
Boys	Jungball
Boys	Superthrow
