= Rivière des Mille Îles =

Channel of the Ottawa River in Quebec, Canada

Coordinates: 45.642848°N 73.771133°W

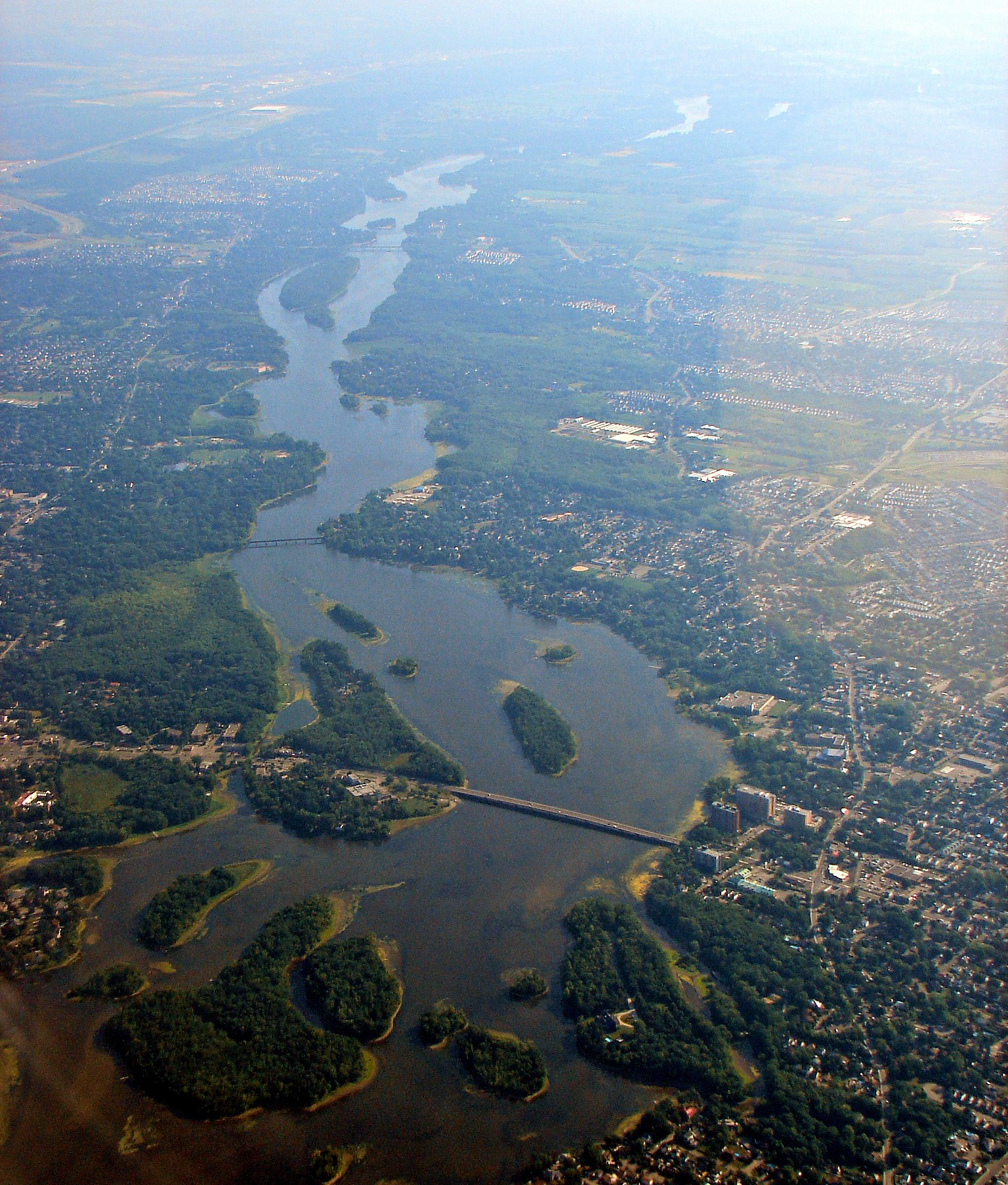
- Aerial view of Mille Îles River with the Pont Marius-Dufresne in the foreground.

Location
- Country: Canada
- Province: Quebec
- Region: Laval, Laurentides and Lanaudière

Physical characteristics
- Source
  - location: Lake of Two Mountains
- Mouth
  - location: Rivière des Prairies
- Length: 42 km (26 mi)

The Rivière des Mille Îles (French: [ʁivjɛʁ de mil il], "Thousand Islands River") is a channel of the Ottawa River in southwestern Quebec, Canada and runs into the Rivière des Prairies. It is 42 kilometres (26 mi) long.

It divides Île Jésus (the city of Laval) from the North Shore, the northern mainland suburbs of Montreal, such as Deux-Montagnes, Saint-Eustache, Boisbriand, Rosemère, Lorraine, Bois-des-Filion, Sainte-Thérèse, and Terrebonne.

The river rises at the narrowing of the Lake of Two Mountains, where the Ottawa River widens as it feeds into the St Lawrence at Montreal, and flows west to east. It joins the Rivière des Prairies at the eastern tip of Île Jésus, which shortly thereafter joins the St. Lawrence at the eastern tip of the Island of Montreal.

As its name suggests, the river contains many small islands which are part of the Hochelaga Archipelago. It is not to be confused with the Thousand Islands at the head of the St. Lawrence River, in Ontario and New York State.

== See also ==
- List of crossings of the Rivière des Mille Îles
- List of Quebec rivers
