= List of regional county municipalities and equivalent territories in Quebec =

Regional county municipalities and equivalent territories of Quebec Municipalités régionales de comtés et territoires équivalents du Québec (French)
- Location: Province of Quebec
- Number: 104
- Populations: 7,082 (L'Île-d'Orléans) – 1,942,044 (Montreal)
- Areas: – 443,372.20 km^{2} (Kativik)
- Government: County government
- Subdivisions: Municipalities

This is a list of the regional county municipalities (RCM or MRC) and equivalent territories (TE) in the province of Quebec, Canada. They are given along with their geographical codes as specified by the Ministry of Municipal Affairs, Regions and Land Occupancy, and the administrative regions to which they belong.

RCMs are county-like units of government at the supralocal level. However, not all municipalities belong to an RCM. In order to use RCMs for statistical purposes, some municipalities (mostly Indian reserves) are viewed as belonging to RCMs they do not belong to legally. The possibly enlarged RCMs are called municipalités régionales de comté géographiques (MRCG) as opposed to the legal ones known as municipalités régionales de comté juridiques (MRCJ). The remaining municipalities are grouped into territories equivalent to an RCM (French: territoires équivalents à une MRC) or TEs, which are also considered MRCGs. This way, MRCGs cover the entire territory of Quebec and do not overlap.

There are 87 RCMs and 17 TEs in Quebec, for a total of 104 MRCGs. 14 of the TEs correspond exactly (or very nearly correspond) to cities or urban agglomerations. The only 3 exceptional cases are the TEs of Jamésie, Kativik and Eeyou Istchee. These TEs lie in Northern Quebec and cover large areas with many, mostly small, municipalities.

Because of cooperation between the Institut de la statistique du Québec and Statistics Canada, RCMs and TEs correspond neatly to census divisions in most cases. See the section "Use as census divisions" below.

For further details, see Regional county municipality.

== Lists ==
Municipalities with populations of at least 5,000 as of the 2006 Census are listed, with their legal status in parentheses. Those with populations over 20,000 are highlighted.

The seat of the regional county municipality (RCM) is indicated with an asterisk (*). If its population is less than 5,000, then it appears in italics.

The information concerning (legal) RCMs, including their seats, is taken from the database of municipalities of the Ministère des Affaires municipales et régionales. Information concerning geographical RCMs is taken from a list published by the Ministère de la Faune et des Ressources naturelles. Relevant definitions can be obtained from the website of the Institut de la Statistique du Québec.

=== East Québec ===
Region	Type	Code	Name	Major communities
01 Bas-Saint-Laurent	MRC	07	La Matapédia	Amqui* (V)
01 Bas-Saint-Laurent	MRC	08	La Matanie	Matane* (V)
01 Bas-Saint-Laurent	MRC	09	La Mitis	Mont-Joli* (V)
01 Bas-Saint-Laurent	MRC	10	Rimouski-Neigette	Rimouski* (V)
01 Bas-Saint-Laurent	MRC	11	Les Basques	Trois-Pistoles* (V)
01 Bas-Saint-Laurent	MRC	12	Rivière-du-Loup	Rivière-du-Loup* (V)
01 Bas-Saint-Laurent	MRC	13	Témiscouata	Témiscouata-sur-le-Lac* (V)
01 Bas-Saint-Laurent	MRC	14	Kamouraska	La Pocatière (V), Saint-Pascal* (V)
11 Gaspésie– Îles-de-la-Madeleine	TE	01	Les Îles-de-la-Madeleine	Les Îles-de-la-Madeleine (M)
11 Gaspésie– Îles-de-la-Madeleine	MRC	02	Le Rocher-Percé	Chandler* (V)
11 Gaspésie– Îles-de-la-Madeleine	MRC	03	La Côte-de-Gaspé	Gaspé* (V)
11 Gaspésie– Îles-de-la-Madeleine	MRC	04	La Haute-Gaspésie	Sainte-Anne-des-Monts* (V)
11 Gaspésie– Îles-de-la-Madeleine	MRC	05	Bonaventure	New Carlisle* (M)
11 Gaspésie– Îles-de-la-Madeleine	MRC	06	Avignon	Carleton-sur-Mer* (V)

=== Quebec City Area ===
Region	Type	Code	Name	Major communities
03 Capitale-Nationale	MRC	15	Charlevoix-Est	Clermont* (V), La Malbaie (V)
03 Capitale-Nationale	MRC	16	Charlevoix	Baie-Saint-Paul* (V)
03 Capitale-Nationale	MRC	20	L'Île-d'Orléans	Sainte-Famille-de-l'Île-d'Orléans* (M)
03 Capitale-Nationale	MRC	21	La Côte-de-Beaupré	Boischatel (M), Château-Richer* (V)
03 Capitale-Nationale	MRC	22	La Jacques-Cartier	Lac-Beauport (M), Sainte-Brigitte-de-Laval (V), Sainte-Catherine-de-la-Jacques-Cartier (V), Shannon* (V), Stoneham-et-Tewkesbury (CU)
03 Capitale-Nationale	TE	23	Québec	L'Ancienne-Lorette (V), Quebec (V), Saint-Augustin-de-Desmaures (V)
03 Capitale-Nationale	MRC	34	Portneuf	Cap-Santé* (V), Donnacona (V), Pont-Rouge (V), Saint-Raymond (V)
12 Chaudière-Appalaches	MRC	17	L'Islet	Saint-Jean-Port-Joli* (M)
12 Chaudière-Appalaches	MRC	18	Montmagny	Montmagny* (V)
12 Chaudière-Appalaches	MRC	19	Bellechasse	Saint-Henri (M), Saint-Lazare-de-Bellechasse* (M)
12 Chaudière-Appalaches	TE	25	Lévis	Lévis (V)
12 Chaudière-Appalaches	MRC	26	La Nouvelle-Beauce	Sainte-Marie* (V), Saint-Lambert-de-Lauzon (M)
12 Chaudière-Appalaches	MRC	27	Beauce-Centre	Beauceville* (V), Saint-Joseph-de-Beauce (V)
12 Chaudière-Appalaches	MRC	28	Les Etchemins	Lac-Etchemin* (M)
12 Chaudière-Appalaches	MRC	29	Beauce-Sartigan	Saint-Georges* (V)
12 Chaudière-Appalaches	MRC	31	Les Appalaches	Thetford Mines* (V)
12 Chaudière-Appalaches	MRC	33	Lotbinière	Saint-Apollinaire (M), Sainte-Croix* (M)

=== Eastern Townships ===
Region	Type	Code	Name	Major communities
05 Estrie	MRC	30	Le Granit	Lac-Mégantic* (V)
05 Estrie	MRC	40	Les Sources	Val-des-Sources* (V)
05 Estrie	MRC	41	Le Haut-Saint-François	Cookshire-Eaton* (V)
05 Estrie	MRC	42	Le Val-Saint-François	Richmond* (V), Windsor (V)
05 Estrie	TE	43	Sherbrooke	Sherbrooke (V)
05 Estrie	MRC	44	Coaticook	Coaticook* (V)
05 Estrie	MRC	45	Memphrémagog	Magog* (V), Orford (CT)
05 Estrie	MRC	46	Brome-Missisquoi	Brome Lake (V), Bromont (V), Cowansville* (V), Farnham (V)
05 Estrie	MRC	47	La Haute-Yamaska	Granby* (V), Shefford (CT)
17 Centre-du-Québec	MRC	32	L'Érable	Plessisville* (V), Princeville (V)
17 Centre-du-Québec	MRC	38	Bécancour	Bécancour* (V)
17 Centre-du-Québec	MRC	39	Arthabaska	Victoriaville* (V)
17 Centre-du-Québec	MRC	49	Drummond	Drummondville* (V)
17 Centre-du-Québec	MRC	50	Nicolet-Yamaska	Nicolet* (V)

=== Montérégie ===
Region	Type	Code	Name	Major communities
16 Montérégie	MRC	48	Acton	Acton Vale* (V)
16 Montérégie	MRC	53	Pierre-De Saurel	Sorel-Tracy* (V)
16 Montérégie	MRC	54	Les Maskoutains	Saint-Hyacinthe* (V), Saint-Pie (V),
16 Montérégie	MRC	55	Rouville	Marieville* (V), Richelieu (V), Saint-Césaire (V)
16 Montérégie	MRC	56	Le Haut-Richelieu	Saint-Jean-sur-Richelieu* (V)
16 Montérégie	MRC	57	La Vallée-du-Richelieu	Belœil (V), Carignan (V), Chambly (V), McMasterville* (M), Mont-Saint-Hilaire (V), Otterburn Park (V), Saint-Basile-le-Grand (V)
16 Montérégie	TE	58	Longueuil	Boucherville (V), Brossard (V), Longueuil (V), Saint-Bruno-de-Montarville (V), Saint-Lambert (V)
16 Montérégie	MRC	59	Marguerite-D'Youville	Contrecoeur (V), Saint-Amable (V), Sainte-Julie* (V), Varennes (V), Verchères* (M)
16 Montérégie	MRC	67	Roussillon	Candiac (V), Châteauguay (V), Delson (V), La Prairie (V), Mercier (V), Saint-Constant* (V), Saint-Philippe (V), Sainte-Catherine (V)
16 Montérégie	MRC	68	Les Jardins-de-Napierville	Napierville* (M), Saint-Rémi (V)
16 Montérégie	MRC	69	Le Haut-Saint-Laurent	Huntingdon* (V)
16 Montérégie	MRC	70	Beauharnois-Salaberry	Beauharnois* (V), Sainte-Martine (M), Salaberry-de-Valleyfield (V)
16 Montérégie	MRC	71	Vaudreuil-Soulanges	Coteau-du-Lac (V), Hudson (V), L'Île-Perrot (V), Les Cèdres (V), Les Coteaux (M), Notre-Dame-de-l'Île-Perrot (V), Pincourt (V), Rigaud (V), Saint-Lazare (V), Saint-Zotique (M), Vaudreuil-Dorion* (V),

=== Montréal and Laval ===
Region	Type	Code	Name	Major communities
13 Laval	TE	65	Laval	Laval (V)
06 Montréal	TE	66	Montréal	Beaconsfield (V), Côte Saint-Luc (V), Dollard-des-Ormeaux (V), Dorval (V), Hampstead (V), Kirkland (V), Montreal (V), Montreal West (V), Mount Royal (V), Pointe-Claire (V), Sainte-Anne-de-Bellevue (V), Westmount (V)

=== Central Québec ===
Region	Type	Code	Name	Major communities
04 Mauricie	MRC	35	Mékinac	Saint-Tite* (V)
04 Mauricie	TE	36	Shawinigan	Shawinigan
04 Mauricie	TE	371	Trois-Rivières	Trois-Rivières
04 Mauricie	MRC	372	Les Chenaux	Notre-Dame-du-Mont-Carmel (P), Saint-Luc-de-Vincennes* (M)
04 Mauricie	MRC	51	Maskinongé	Louiseville* (V), Saint-Boniface (M)
04 Mauricie	TE	90	La Tuque	La Tuque (V)
14 Lanaudière	MRC	52	D'Autray	Berthierville* (V), Lanoraie (M), Lavaltrie (V)
14 Lanaudière	MRC	60	L'Assomption	Charlemagne (V), L'Assomption* (V), L'Épiphanie (V), Repentigny (V)
14 Lanaudière	MRC	61	Joliette	Joliette* (V), Notre-Dame-des-Prairies (V), Saint-Charles-Borromée (V), Saint-Paul (M)
14 Lanaudière	MRC	62	Matawinie	Chertsey (M), Rawdon* (M), Saint-Félix-de-Valois (M)
14 Lanaudière	MRC	63	Montcalm	Saint-Calixte (M), Saint-Lin-Laurentides (V), Saint-Roch-de-l'Achigan, (M), Sainte-Julienne* (M)
14 Lanaudière	MRC	64	Les Moulins	Terrebonne* (V), Mascouche (V)

=== West Québec ===
Region	Type	Code	Name	Major communities
07 Outaouais	MRC	80	Papineau	Papineauville* (M)
07 Outaouais	TE	81	Gatineau	Gatineau (V)
07 Outaouais	MRC	82	Les Collines-de-l'Outaouais	Cantley (M), Chelsea* (M), L'Ange-Gardien (M), La Pêche (M), Pontiac (M), Val-des-Monts (M)
07 Outaouais	MRC	83	La Vallée-de-la-Gatineau	Gracefield* (V)
07 Outaouais	MRC	84	Pontiac	Campbell's Bay* (M)
08 Abitibi-Témiscamingue	MRC	85	Témiscamingue	Ville-Marie* (V)
08 Abitibi-Témiscamingue	TE	86	Rouyn-Noranda	Rouyn-Noranda (V)
08 Abitibi-Témiscamingue	MRC	87	Abitibi-Ouest	La Sarre* (V)
08 Abitibi-Témiscamingue	MRC	88	Abitibi	Amos* (V)
08 Abitibi-Témiscamingue	MRC	89	La Vallée-de-l'Or	Val-d'Or* (V)
15 Laurentides	MRC	72	Deux-Montagnes	Deux-Montagnes (V), Oka (M), Pointe-Calumet (M), Saint-Eustache* (V), Saint-Joseph-du-Lac (M), Sainte-Marthe-sur-le-Lac (V)
15 Laurentides	MRC	73	Thérèse-De Blainville	Blainville (V), Boisbriand (V), Bois-des-Filion (V), Lorraine (V), Rosemère (V), Sainte-Anne-des-Plaines (V), Sainte-Thérèse* (V)
15 Laurentides	TE	74	Mirabel	Mirabel
15 Laurentides	MRC	75	La Rivière-du-Nord	Prévost (V), Saint-Colomban (V), Saint-Hippolyte (M), Saint-Jérôme* (V), Sainte-Sophie (M)
15 Laurentides	MRC	76	Argenteuil	Brownsburg-Chatham (V), Lachute* (V)
15 Laurentides	MRC	77	Les Pays-d'en-Haut	Saint-Sauveur (V), Sainte-Adèle* (V)
15 Laurentides	MRC	78	Les Laurentides	Sainte-Agathe-des-Monts (V), Mont-Blanc* (M), Mont-Tremblant (V), Val-David (VM)
15 Laurentides	MRC	79	Antoine-Labelle	Mont-Laurier* (V)

=== Northern Québec ===
Region	Type	Code	Name	Major communities
02 Saguenay–Lac-Saint-Jean	MRC	91	Le Domaine-du-Roy	Roberval* (V), Saint-Félicien (V)
02 Saguenay–Lac-Saint-Jean	MRC	92	Maria-Chapdelaine	Dolbeau-Mistassini* (V)
02 Saguenay–Lac-Saint-Jean	MRC	93	Lac-Saint-Jean-Est	Alma* (V), Hébertville (M)
02 Saguenay–Lac-Saint-Jean	TE	941	Saguenay*	Saguenay (V)
02 Saguenay–Lac-Saint-Jean	MRC	942	Le Fjord-du-Saguenay	Saint-Honoré* (V)
09 Côte-Nord	MRC	95	La Haute-Côte-Nord	Les Escoumins* (M)
09 Côte-Nord	MRC	96	Manicouagan	Baie-Comeau* (V)
09 Côte-Nord	MRC	971	Sept-Rivières	Port-Cartier (V), Sept-Îles* (V)
09 Côte-Nord	MRC	972	Caniapiscau	Fermont* (V)
09 Côte-Nord	MRC	981	Minganie	Havre-Saint-Pierre* (M)
09 Côte-Nord	MRC	982	Le Golfe-du-Saint-Laurent	Côte-Nord-du-Golfe-du-Saint-Laurent* (M)
10 Nord-du-Québec	TE	991	Jamésie	Chibougamau* (V)
10 Nord-du-Québec	TE	992	Kativik	Kuujjuaq* (NV)
10 Nord-du-Québec	TE	993	Eeyou Istchee	Chisasibi* (TC)

== Use as census divisions ==
Statistics Canada divides Quebec into 98 census divisions that are mostly coextensive with Quebec's regional county municipalities and equivalent territories.

93 of these census divisions correspond to a single regional county municipality or equivalent territory in the list above. In these cases the census division and the corresponding RCM or TE share a single two-digit geographical code, except for Lévis, whose code is 251.

The census divisions that are an exception to this are shown below, with geographical codes in parentheses:

- The CD of Francheville (37) consists of the TE of Trois-Rivières (371) and the RCM of Les Chenaux (372). These two divisions formerly constituted the single RCM of Francheville, which was dissolved in 2002.
- The CD of Le Saguenay-et-son-Fjord (94) consists of the TE of Saguenay (941) and the RCM of Le Fjord-du-Saguenay (942). Le Fjord-du-Saguenay formerly included the smaller cities which were amalgamated to create the new city of Saguenay in 2002.
- The CD of Sept-Rivières—Caniapiscau (97) consists of the RCMs of Sept-Rivières (971) and Caniapiscau (972).
- The CD of Minganie–Le Golfe-du-Saint-Laurent (98) consists of the RCMs of Minganie (981) and Le Golfe-du-Saint-Laurent (982). The latter superseded Basse-Côte-Nord in 2010; Basse-Côte-Nord itself was part of Minganie until 2002.
- The CD of Nord-du-Québec (99) is coextensive with the administrative region of Nord-du-Québec and consists of the TEs of Jamésie (991), Kativik (992) and Eeyou Istchee (993).

== Former regional county municipalities ==
The following former regional county municipalities all ceased to exist in conjunction with changes introduced in the 2000–2006 municipal reorganization in Quebec:

- Champlain Regional County Municipality
- Desjardins Regional County Municipality
- Francheville Regional County Municipality
- La Région-Sherbrookoise Regional County Municipality
- Laval Regional County Municipality
- Le Centre-de-la-Mauricie Regional County Municipality
- Le Haut-Saint-Maurice Regional County Municipality
- Les Chutes-de-la-Chaudière Regional County Municipality
- Les Îles-de-la-Madeleine Regional County Municipality
- Mirabel Regional County Municipality
- Rouyn-Noranda Regional County Municipality

== Renamed regional county municipalities ==
- La Haute-Gaspésie Regional County Municipality was formerly known as Denis-Riverin RCM.
- The former La Région-Sherbrookoise Regional County Municipality was earlier known as Sherbrooke RCM.
- La Vallée-de-l'Or Regional County Municipality was formerly known as Vallée-de-l'Or RCM.
- Le Rocher-Percé Regional County Municipality was formerly known as Pabok RCM.
- Les Appalaches Regional County Municipality was formerly known as L'Amiante RCM.
- Les Sources Regional County Municipality was formerly known as Asbestos RCM, and prior to that as L'Or-Blanc RCM.
- Marguerite-D'Youville Regional County Municipality was formerly known as Lajemmerais RCM.
- Pierre-De Saurel Regional County Municipality was formerly known as Le Bas-Richelieu RCM.
- Beauce-Centre Regional County Municipality was formerly known as Robert-Cliche RCM.

== See also ==
- Administrative divisions of Quebec
- Local government in Quebec
- 21st-century municipal history of Quebec
- Regions of Quebec
- List of communities in Quebec
- Census geographic units of Canada
- List of census divisions of Quebec
- List of historic counties of Quebec
