= 21st-century municipal history of Quebec =

Aspect of Canadian history

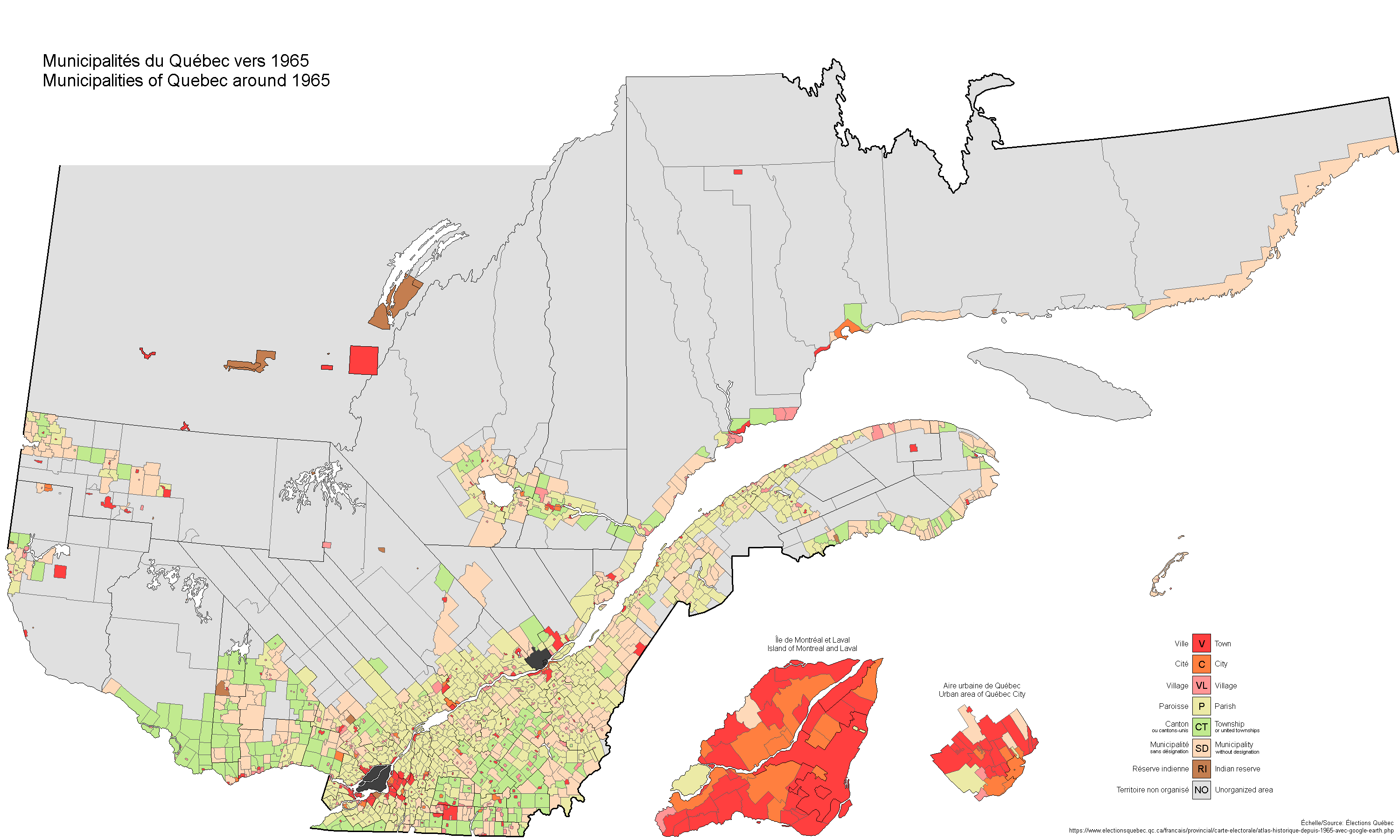
Municipalities of Quebec around 1965

The municipal history of Quebec started in 1796 with the creation of administrations for Montréal and Quebec City, but was abolished and replaced in September 1847 by a system of county municipalities, whose councillors were elected from the parishes and townships existing therein, with provision for the creation of towns and villages that would be separated from their counties. Further reform came into effect in July 1855 for all parts of Lower Canada other than Montreal, Quebec City and Saint-Hyacinthe, which included provision for the creation of local councils for parishes and townships, the representation of towns and villages on county councils, and the formation of towns and villages by order in council upon the recommendation of the relevant county council. The municipal law of Lower Canada was consolidated into a single Act in 1860.

For more than a century localities changed little. The early 20th century saw the 2000–2006 municipal reorganization in Quebec, the large-scale amalgamation of smaller municipalities in Quebec into larger cities from 2000–2003 and the subsequent de-mergers in 2006, as well as reorganizations of Mont-Tremblant (2000), Chandler (2001), Saint-Jean-sur-Richelieu (2001) and Saint-Hyacinthe (2001).

Municipalities written in bold are on their current form.

== 21st century ==
=== 2000 ===
Forty-seven municipality modifications were approved in 2000.

- 1 January:
  - The City of Saint-Pierre is annexed by the City of Lachine.
  - Creation of the Municipality of L'Islet-sur-Mer-Saint-Eugène-l'Islet by the merger of the City of L'Islet, the Municipality of L'Islet-sur-Mer and the Parish of Saint-Eugène.
- 5 January (amended 21 January): Québec administrative region changed its name to Capitale-Nationale administrative region.
- 12 January: Creation of the Municipality of Rivière-Blanche by the merger of the Village of Saint-Ulric and the Parish of Saint-Ulric-de-Matane.
- 26 January:
  - Creation of the Municipality of **Leclercville** by the merger of the Village of Leclercville and the Parish of Sainte-Emmélie.
  - Creation of the Municipality of **Ormstown** by the merger of the Village of Ormstown and the Parish of Saint-Malachie-d'Ormstown.
  - Creation of the Municipality of **Rougemont** by the merger of the Village of Rougemont and the Parish of Saint-Michel-de-Rougemont.
  - The Parish of Saint-André-d'Acton is annexed by the City of **Acton Vale**.
  - The Parish of Saint-Césaire is annexed by the City of **Saint-Césaire**.
- 2 February: Creation of the City of Sainte-Anne-des-Monts-Tourelle by the merger of the City of Sainte-Anne-des-Monts and the Municipality of Tourelle.
- 9 February:
  - The Municipality of Beaudry is annexed by the City of **Rouyn-Noranda**.
  - Creation of the Municipality of **L'Isle-Verte** by the merger of the Village of L'Isle-Verte and the Municipality of Saint-Jean-Baptiste-de-l'Isle-Verte.
  - The Village of Saint-Gérard is annexed by the Municipality of **Weedon**.
- 23 February: The Parish of Princeville is annexed by the City of **Princeville**.
- 1 March:
  - Creation of the City of **Saint-Basile** by the merger of the Village of Saint-Basile-Sud and the Parish of Saint-Basile.
  - Creation of the City of **Saint-Lin-Laurentides** by the merger of the City of Laurentides and the Municipality of Saint-Lin.
  - The Municipality of Saint-Pascal is annexed by the City of **Saint-Pascal**.
- 8 March: The Municipality of Rainville is annexed by the City of **Farnham**.
- 15 March:
  - Creation of the City of **Sorel-Tracy** by the merger of the City of Sorel and the City of Tracy.
  - Creation of the Municipality of **Beaulac-Garthby** by the merger of the Village of Beaulac and the Township of Garthby.
  - The Municipality of Capucins is annexed by the City of **Cap-Chat**.
  - The Municipality of Notre-Dame-de-Bon-Secours is annexed by the City of **Richelieu**.
  - The Township of Warwick is annexed by the City of **Warwick**.
- 8 April: The Municipality of **Daveluyville** became a City.
- 19 April: Creation of the Municipality of **Saint-Honoré-de-Shenley** by the merger of the Parish of Saint-Honoré and the Township of Shenley.
- 3 May:
  - Creation of the Municipality of **Ripon** by the merger of the Village of Ripon and the Township of Ripon.
  - The Village of New-Glasgow is annexed by the Municipality of **Sainte-Sophie**.
- 27 May: Denis-Riverin Regional County Municipality changed its name to La Haute-Gaspésie Regional County Municipality.
- 14 June:
  - The Village of L'Île-d'Entrée is annexed by the Municipality of L’Île-du-Havre-Aubert.
  - The Parish of Sainte-Marie-de-Monnoir is annexed by the City of **Marieville**.
- 21 June: The Parish of Saint-Casimir is annexed by the Municipality of **Saint-Casimir**.
- 26 June: The Municipality of Cascapédia changed its name to **Cascapédia-Saint-Jules**.
- 1 July: The Parish of Saint-Gérard-Majella is annexed by the City of **L'Assomption**.
- 23 August: Creation of the Municipality of **L'Isle-aux-Coudres** by the merger of the Municipality of L'Île-aux-Coudres and the Municipality of La Baleine.
- 16 September:
  - The Municipality of **Kingsey Falls** became a City.
  - The Municipality of Lac-Nominingue changed its name to **Nominingue**.
  - The Parish of **Saint-Esprit** became a Municipality.
- 4 October: Creation of the City of Carleton-Saint-Omer by the merger of the City of Carleton and the Parish of Saint-Omer.
- 28 October: The Parish of **Larouche** became a Municipality.
- 11 November:
  - The Municipality of L'Islet-sur-Mer-Saint-Eugène-l'Islet changed its name to **L'Islet**.
  - The Municipality of Rivière-Blanche changed its name to **Saint-Ulric**.
- 18 November: The Parish of Sainte-Anne-du-Sault became a Municipality.
- 22 November: Creation of the City of **Mont-Tremblant** by the merger of the City of Saint-Jovite, the Municipality of Lac-Tremblant-Nord, the Municipality of Mont-Tremblant and the Parish of Saint-Jovite.
- 25 November:
  - The Municipality of Saint-André-Carillon changed its name to **Saint-André-d'Argenteuil**.
  - The Village of **Saint-Pie** became a City.
- 29 November:
  - Creation of the Municipality of **Papineauville** by the merger of the Village of Papineauville and the Parish of Sainte-Angélique.
  - The Municipality of Vianney and the Village of Bernierville are annexed by the Municipality of **Saint-Ferdinand**.
- 6 December: Creation of the Municipality of **Lanoraie** by the merger of the Municipality of Lanoraie-d'Autray and the Parish of Saint-Joseph-de-Lanoraie.
- 9 December: The Municipality of **Sainte-Catherine-de-la-Jacques-Cartier** became a City.
- 27 December: The Municipality of Nicolet-Sud and the Parish of Saint-Jean-Baptiste-de-Nicolet are annexed by the City of **Nicolet**.
- 30 December: The Municipality of **Cap-Santé** became a City.

=== 2001 ===
Thirty-three municipality modifications were approved in 2001.

- 1 January: Creation of the Montreal Metropolitan Community.
- 17 January: Creation of the Municipality of **Port-Daniel-Gascons** by the merger of the Municipality of Port-Daniel and the Parish of Sainte-Germaine-de-l'Anse-aux-Gascons.
- 24 January: Creation of the City of Saint-Jean-Iberville by the merger of the City of Iberville, the City of Saint-Jean-sur-Richelieu, the City of Saint-Luc, the Municipality of L'Acadie and the Parish of Saint-Athanase.
- 10 February: The City of Sainte-Anne-des-Monts-Tourelle changed its name to **Sainte-Anne-des-Monts**.
- 14 February: Creation of the Municipality of **Adstock** by the merger of the Municipality of Saint-Méthode-de-Frontenac and the Parish of Sacré-Coeur-de-Marie-Partie-Sud.
- 21 February: The Municipality of Delisle is annexed by the City of **Alma**.
- 25 April:
  - Creation of the Municipality of Eaton by the merger of Village of Sawyerville and the Township of Eaton.
  - Creation of the Municipality of **Maskinongé** by the merger of the Village of Maskinongé and the Parish of Saint-Joseph-de-Maskinongé.
  - Creation of the Municipality of **Saint-Siméon** by the merger of the Village of Saint-Siméon and the Parish of Saint-Siméon.
- 16 May: Creation of the City of **Lavaltrie** by the merger of the Village of Lavaltrie and the Parish of Saint-Antoine-de-Lavaltrie.
- 26 May: The City of Saint-Jean-Iberville changed its name to **Saint-Jean-sur-Richelieu**.
- 30 May: Creation of the Municipality of **Eastman** by the merger of the Municipality of Stukely and the Village of Eastman.
- 2 June: The Municipality of Saint-Charles-de-Mandeville changed its name to **Mandeville**.
- 13 June:
  - Creation of the Municipality of **Pierreville** by the merger of the Village of Pierreville, the Parish of Notre-Dame-de-Pierreville and the Parish of Saint-Thomas-de-Pierreville.
  - The Municipality of Saint-Jean-Baptiste is annexed by the City of **Mont-Joli**.
  - The Parish of Macamic is annexed by the City of **Macamic**.
- 27 June:
  - The City of La Plaine and the City of Lachenaie are annexed by the City of **Terrebonne**.
  - Creation of the City of Pabos by the merger of the City of Chandler, the Municipality of Newport, the Municipality of Pabos, the Municipality of Pabos Mills and the Municipality of Saint-François-de-Pabos.
- 29 August: Creation of the Municipality of Sainte-Luce-Luceville by the merger of the Village of Luceville and the Parish of Sainte-Luce.
- 13 September: Creation of the Municipality of **Lacolle** by the merger of the Village of Lacolle and the Parish of Notre-Dame-du-Mont-Carmel.
- 19 September:
  - Creation of the Municipality of **Montcerf-Lytton** by the merger of the Municipality of Montcerf and the Township of Lytton.
  - The Village of Saint-Joseph-de-la-Rive is annexed by the Municipality of **Les Éboulements**.
- 26 September:
  - The Municipality of Aubert-Gallion and the Parish of Saint-Georges-Est are annexed by the City of **Saint-Georges**.
  - The Municipality of Petit-Matane, the Municipality of Saint-Luc-de-Matane and the Parish of Saint-Jérôme-de-Matane are annexed by the City of **Matane**.
- 5 October:
  - Creation of the Municipality of **Saint-Damase** by the merger of the Village of Saint-Damase and Parish of Saint-Damase.
  - Creation of the Municipality of **Sainte-Croix** by the merger of the Village of Sainte-Croix and Parish of Sainte-Croix.
- 10 October: Creation of the Municipality of **Lac-Etchemin** by the merger of the City of Lac-Etchemin and the Parish of Sainte-Germaine-du-Lac-Etchemin.
- 17 October:
  - Creation of the City of Sainte-Marguerite-Estérel by the merger of the City of Estérel and the Parish of Sainte-Marguerite-du-Lac-Masson.
  - The City of Black Lake, the Municipality of Pontbriand, the Village of Robertsonville and the Township of Thetford-Partie-Sud are annexed by the City of **Thetford Mines**.
- 24 October: The Village of Sainte-Anne-du-Lac is annexed by the Municipality of **Adstock**.
- 4 November: Elections were held in nearly all municipalities of Quebec.
- 19 December: Creation of the Municipality of **Yamaska** by the merger of the Village of Yamaska, the Village of Yamaska-Est and the Parish of Saint-Michel-d'Yamaska.
- 27 December:
  - The City of Sainte-Rosalie, the Parish of Notre-Dame-de-Saint-Hyacinthe, the Parish of Saint-Hyacinthe-le-Confesseur, the Parish of Saint-Thomas-d'Aquin and the Parish of Sainte-Rosalie are annexed by the City of **Saint-Hyacinthe**.
  - The Village of Taschereau is annexed by the Municipality of **Taschereau**.
- 29 December: The Parish of **Saint-Lazare** became a City.

=== 2002 ===
Sixty-eight municipality modifications were approved in 2002.

- 1 January:
  - The City of Anjou, the City of Baie-d'Urfé, the City of Beaconsfield, the City of Côte-Saint-Luc, the City of Dollard-des-Ormeaux, the City of Dorval, the City of Hampstead, the City of Kirkland, the City of L'Île-Bizard, the City of L'Île-Dorval, the City of Lachine, the City of Lasalle, the City of Mont-Royal, the City of Montréal-Est, the City of Montréal-Nord, the City of Montréal-Ouest, the City of Outremont, the City of Pierrefonds, the City of Pointe-Claire, the City of Roxboro, the City of Saint-Laurent, the City of Saint-Léonard, the City of Sainte-Anne-de-Bellevue, the City of Sainte-Geneviève, the City of Verdun, the City of Westmount and the Village of Senneville are annexed by the City of **Montréal**.
    - The Montreal Urban Community became defunct in conjunction with the above.
  - Creation of the Quebec Metropolitan Community.
  - The City of Beauport, the City of Cap-Rouge, the City of Charlesbourg, the City of L'Ancienne-Lorette, the City of Lac-Saint-Charles, the City of Loretteville, the City of Saint-Émile, the City of Sainte-Foy, the City of Sillery, the City of Val-Bélair, the City of Vanier and the Municipality of Saint-Augustin-de-Desmaures are annexed by **Quebec City**.
    - The Quebec City Urban Community (Communauté urbaine de Québec) became defunct in conjunction with the above.
  - The City of Aylmer, the City of Buckingham, the City of Hull and the City of Masson-Angers are annexed by the City of **Gatineau**.
    - The Outaouais Urban Community (Communauté urbaine de l'Outaouais) became defunct in conjunction with the above.
  - The City of Boucherville, the City of Brossard, the City of Greenfield-Park, the City of LeMoyne, the City of Saint-Bruno-de-Montarville, the City of Saint-Hubert and the City of Saint-Lambert are annexed by the City of **Longueuil**.
    - Champlain Regional County Municipality became defunct in conjunction with the above.
  - The City of Bromptonville, the City of Fleurimont, the City of Lennoxville, the City of Rock-Forest, the Municipality of Ascot and the Municipality of Deauville are annexed by the City of **Sherbrooke**.
  - The Municipality of Saint-Élie-d’Orford is dissolved and its territory is split between the City of **Sherbrooke**, the Parish of Saint-Denis-de-Brompton and the Township of **Orford**.
    - La Région-Sherbrookoise Regional County Municipality became defunct in conjunction with the above.
  - The City of Charny, the City of Saint-Jean-Chrysostome, the City of Saint-Nicolas, the City of Saint-Rédempteur, the City of Saint-Romuald, the Municipality of Pintendre, the Municipality of Saint-Étienne-de-Lauzon, the Parish of Saint-Joseph-de-la-Pointe-de-Lévy and the Parish of Sainte-Hélène-de-Breakeyville are annexed by the City of **Lévis**.
    - Desjardins Regional County Municipality and Les Chutes-de-la-Chaudière Regional County Municipality became defunct in conjunction with the above.
  - The City of Cap-de-la-Madeleine, the City of Saint-Louis-de-France, the City of Sainte-Marthe-du-Cap, the City of Trois-Rivières-Ouest and the Municipality of Pointe-du-Lac are annexed by the City of **Trois-Rivières**.
    - Francheville Regional County Municipality became defunct in conjunction with the above.
    - Les Chenaux Regional County Municipality was created in conjunction with the above, mostly from the parts of Francheville RCM that did not form the new Town of Trois-Rivières.
  - The City of Grand-Mère, the City of Shawinigan-Sud, the Village of Saint-Georges, the Parish of Lac-à-la-Tortue, the Parish of Saint-Gérard-des-Laurentides and the Parish of Saint-Jean-des-Piles are annexed by the City of **Shawinigan**.
    - Le Centre-de-la-Mauricie Regional County Municipality became defunct in conjunction with the above.
    - The Unorganized Territories of Lac-des-Cinq and Lac-Wapizagonke were annexed into Shawinigan.
  - The City of Bellefeuille, the City of Lafontaine and the City of Saint-Antoine are annexed by the City of **Saint-Jérôme**.
  - The City of Pointe-au-Père, the Municipality of Mont-Lebel, the Village of Rimouski-Est, the Parish of Sainte-Blandine and the Parish of Sainte-Odile-sur-Rimouski are annexed by the City of **Rimouski**.
  - The City of Maple Grove and the Village of Melocheville are annexed by the City of **Beauharnois**.
  - The City of Cadillac, the Municipality of Arntfield, the Municipality of Bellecombe, the Municipality of Cléricy, the Municipality of Cloutier, the Municipality of D'Alembert, the Municipality of Destor, the Municipality of Évain, the Municipality of McWatters, the Municipality of Mont-Brun, the Municipality of Montbeillard and the Municipality of Rollet are annexed by the City of **Rouyn-Noranda**.
    - Rouyn-Noranda Regional County Municipality became defunct in conjunction with the above.
  - The Municipality of Dubuisson, the Municipality of Sullivan, the Municipality of Val-Senneville and the Municipality of Vassan are annexed by the City of **Val-d'Or**.
  - Creation of the Municipality of **Les Îles-de-la-Madeleine** by the merger of the Municipality of Fatima, the Municipality of Grande-Entrée, the Municipality of Grosse-Île, the Municipality of Havre-aux-Maisons, the Municipality of L’Étang-du-Nord, the Municipality of L’Île-du-Havre-Aubert and the Village of Cap-aux-Meules.
    - Les Îles-de-la-Madeleine Regional County Municipality became defunct in conjunction with the above.
  - Laval Regional County Municipality and Mirabel Regional County Municipality became defunct.
  - The Municipality of Charette moved from the defunct Le Centre-de-la-Mauricie Regional County Municipality to Maskinongé Regional County Municipality.
  - The Village of Saint-Boniface-de-Shawinigan moved from the defunct Le Centre-de-la-Mauricie Regional County Municipality to Maskinongé Regional County Municipality.
  - The Parish of Saint-Élie moved from the defunct Le Centre-de-la-Mauricie Regional County Municipality to Maskinongé Regional County Municipality.
  - The Parish of Saint-Étienne-des-Grès moved from the defunct Francheville Regional County Municipality to Maskinongé Regional County Municipality.
  - The Municipality of Saint-Henri moved from the defunct Desjardins Regional County Municipality to Bellechasse Regional County Municipality.
  - The Parish of Saint-Lambert-de-Lauzon moved from the defunct Les Chutes-de-la-Chaudière Regional County Municipality to La Nouvelle-Beauce Regional County Municipality.
  - The Parish of Saint-Mathieu-du-Parc moved from the defunct Le Centre-de-la-Mauricie Regional County Municipality to Maskinongé Regional County Municipality.
  - The Town of Waterville moved from the defunct La Région-Sherbrookoise Regional County Municipality to Coaticook Regional County Municipality.
  - The Municipality of Batiscan moved from the defunct Francheville Regional County Municipality to the new Les Chenaux Regional County Municipality.
  - The Municipality of Champlain moved from the defunct Francheville Regional County Municipality to the new Les Chenaux Regional County Municipality.
  - The Parish of Notre-Dame-du-Mont-Carmel moved from the defunct Le Centre-de-la-Mauricie Regional County Municipality to the new Les Chenaux Regional County Municipality.
  - The Municipality of Saint-Luc-de-Vincennes moved from the defunct Francheville Regional County Municipality to the new Les Chenaux Regional County Municipality.
  - The Parish of Saint-Maurice moved from the defunct Francheville Regional County Municipality to the new Les Chenaux Regional County Municipality.
  - The Parish of Saint-Narcisse moved from the defunct Francheville Regional County Municipality to the new Les Chenaux Regional County Municipality.
  - The Parish of Saint-Prosper (Mauricie) moved from the defunct Francheville Regional County Municipality to the new Les Chenaux Regional County Municipality.
  - The Municipality of Saint-Stanislas (Mauricie) moved from the defunct Francheville Regional County Municipality to the new Les Chenaux Regional County Municipality.
  - The Municipality of Sainte-Anne-de-la-Pérade moved from the defunct Francheville Regional County Municipality to the new Les Chenaux Regional County Municipality.
  - The Parish of Sainte-Geneviève-de-Batiscan moved from the defunct Francheville Regional County Municipality to the new Les Chenaux Regional County Municipality.
- 19 January: The Municipality of Saint-Elzéar changed its name to **Saint-Elzéar-de-Témiscouata**.
- 18 February: Creation of the City of **Saguenay** by the merger of the City of Chicoutimi, the City of Jonquière, the City of La Baie, the City of Laterrière, the Municipality of Lac-Kénogami, the Municipality of Shipshaw and the Township of Tremblay.
  - Le Fjord-du-Saguenay Regional County Municipality was altered in conjunction with the above, to exclude the parts that went into the new City of Saguenay.
- 27 February:
  - Creation of the Municipality of **Deschambault-Grondines** by the merger of the Municipality of Deschambault and the Municipality of Grondines.
  - The Municipality of Ivry-sur-le-Lac and the Municipality of Saint-Agathe-Nord are annexed by the City of **Sainte-Agathe-des-Monts**.
- 6 March: The Municipality of Colombourg is annexed by the City of **Macamic**.
- 13 March: Creation of the City of Wright-Gracefield-Northfield by the merger of the Municipality of Northfield, the Village of Gracefield, the Township of Wright.
- 24 April:
  - The City of Saint-Timothée and the Municipality of Grande-Île are annexed by the City of **Salaberry-de-Valleyfield**.
  - Creation of the Municipality of **Grenville-sur-la-Rouge** by the merger of the Village of Calumet and the Township of Grenville.
- 27 April: The Municipality of Sainte-Luce-Luceville changed its name to **Sainte-Luce**.
- 4 May: The City of Pabos changed its name to **Chandler**.
- 1 June: The City of Le Gardeur is annexed by the City of **Repentigny**.
- 4 July:
  - Creation of the City of **Métis-sur-Mer** by the merger of the Municipality of Les Boules and the Village of Métis-sur-Mer.
  - The Parish of Notre-Dame-de-Portneuf is annexed by the City of **Portneuf**.
  - The Township of Sutton is annexed by the City of **Sutton**.
- 6 July:
  - The Municipality of **Brownsburg-Chatham** became a City.
  - Annexation of the Unorganized Territory of Lac-Touradi to Saint-Eugène-de-Ladrière.
- 24 July: Creation of the City of **Cookshire-Eaton** by the merger of the City of Cookshire, the Municipality of Eaton and the Township of Newport.
- 11 September: Creation of the City of **Saint-Sauveur** by the merger of the Village of Saint-Sauveur-des-Monts and the Parish of Saint-Sauveur.
- 21 September: The Parish of Laverlochère became a Municipality.
- 9 October: The Village of Omerville and the Township of Magog are annexed by the City of **Magog**.
- 10 October: Creation of the Municipality of Beaux-Rivages-Lac-des-Écorces-Val-Barrette by the merger of the Municipality of Beaux-Rivages, the Village of Lac-des-Écorces and the Village of Val-Barrette.
- 18 December: Creation of the City of **Rivière-Rouge** by the merger of the Municipality of La Macaza, the Municipality of Marchand, the Village of L’Annonciation and the Village of Sainte-Véronique.

=== 2003 ===
Thirty-one municipality modifications were approved in 2003.

- 8 January: The Municipality of Des Ruisseaux and the Parish of Saint-Aimé-du-Lac-des-Îles are annexed by the City of **Mont-Laurier**.
- 12 February:
  - The City of Moisie and the Municipality of Gallix are annexed by the City of **Sept-Îles**.
  - The Parish of Saint-Gédéon is annexed by the Municipality of **Saint-Gédéon-de-Beauce**.
- 19 February: The Municipality of Rivière-Pentecôte is annexed by the City of **Port-Cartier**.
- 22 February: The City of Wright-Gracefield-Northfield changed its name to **Gracefield**.
- 28 February: The Parish of Saint-Pie is annexed by the City of **Saint-Pie**.
- 26 March: The Municipality of La Bostonnais, The Municipality of La Croche, The Municipality of Lac-Édouard and the Village of Parent are annexed by the City of **La Tuque**.
  - Le Haut-Saint-Maurice Regional County Municipality became defunct in conjunction with the above.
- 5 April:
  - The Village of Saint-Boniface-de-Shawinigan became the Municipality of **Saint-Boniface**.
  - The Parish of Saint-Jean became the Municipality of **Saint-Jean-de-l'Île-d'Orléans**.
- 13 April: The Quebec Liberal Party came to power in the 2003 Quebec election, with a campaign promise to allow voters a say in reversing some of the 2000–2003 municipal amalgamations undertaken by the previous Parti Québécois government (see 2000–2006 municipal reorganization in Quebec).
- 21 June: The Municipality of Beaux-Rivages-Lac-des-Écorces-Val-Barrette changed its name to **Lac-des-Écorces**.
- 19 July: the Parish of **Saint-Jean-Baptiste** became a Municipality.
- 26 July: The Township of Grand-Calumet became a Municipality.
- 2 August:
  - The Village of **Montebello** became a Municipality.
  - The Village of **Shawville** became a Municipality.
  - The Parish of Notre-Dame-de-Bon-Secours became the Municipality of **Notre-Dame-de-Bonsecours**.
  - The Township of **Thorne** became a Municipality.
  - The United Townships of **Mulgrave-et-Derry** became a Municipality.
- 11 October:
  - The Village of **Campbell's Bay** became a Municipality.
  - The Parish of **Notre-Dame-de-la-Paix** became a Municipality.
  - The Parish of **Saint-François-d'Assise** became a Municipality.
  - The Township of **Clarendon** became a Municipality.
  - The Township of **Denholm** became a Municipality.
  - The Township of **Grand-Remous** became a Municipality.
  - The United Townships of **Mansfield-et-Pontefract** became a Municipality.
  - The United Townships of Sheen-Esther-Aberdeen-et-Malakoff became the Municipality of **Sheenboro**.
  - Vallée-de-l'Or Regional County Municipality changed its name to La Vallée-de-l'Or Regional County Municipality.
- 13 December: The Parish of **Saint-Alexis-de-Matapédia** became a Municipality.
- 20 December:
  - The Village of **Bryson** became a Municipality.
  - The Parish of Saint-François became the Municipality of **Saint-François-de-l'Île-d'Orléans**.
  - The United Townships of Leslie-Clapham-et-Huddersfield became the Municipality of **Otter Lake**.

=== 2004 ===
The process to de-merge some municipalities created in 2000–2003 began on May 16, 2004, through the collection of signatures to organize municipal referendums held on June 20. Some residents voted to de-merge and reconstitute their former municipalities, effective January 1, 2006. In the meantime, thirteen municipality modifications were approved in 2004.

- 10 January: The Parish of **Tingwick** became a Municipality.
- 31 January: The Municipality of Sainte-Anne-de-Portneuf changed its name to **Portneuf-sur-Mer**.
- 7 February:
  - The Parish of **Berthier-sur-Mer** became a Municipality.
  - The United Townships of **Alleyn-et-Cawood** became a Municipality.
- 24 April: the Township of **Bristol** became a Municipality.
- 12 June: the Village of **Saint-Marc-des-Carrières** became a City.
- 7 July: The City of Saint-Nicéphore and the Municipality of Saint-Charles-de-Drummond are annexed by the City of **Drummondville**.
- 8 September:
  - The Inuit reserved land of Kuujjuarapik (not to be confused with the northern village of the same name) is created from territory taken from the Unorganized Territory of Baie-d'Hudson.
  - The Inuit reserved land of Umiujaq (not to be confused with the northern village of the same name) is created from territory taken from the Unorganized Territory of Baie-d'Hudson.
- 6 November:
  - The Municipality of **Notre-Dame-de-l'Île-Perrot** became a City.
  - The Township of **Litchfield** became a Municipality.
- 27 November: The Municipality of Saint-Edmond changed its name to **Saint-Edmond-les-Plaines**.

=== 2005 ===
Eight municipality modifications were approved in 2005.

- 15 January:
  - The Parish of **Grande-Vallée** became a Municipality.
  - The Parish of Saint-Élie became the Municipality of **Saint-Élie-de-Caxton**.
- 23 April: The Municipality of **Notre-Dame-des-Prairies** became a City.
- 7 May: The City of Carleton-Saint-Omer changed its name to **Carleton-sur-Mer**.
- 18 June: The Parish of **Saint-Julien** became a Municipality.
- 8 October: the Parish of **Notre-Dame-de-Lourdes** became a Municipality.
- 31 October: The Unorganized Territory of Rivière-Kipawa is split into the Unorganized Territories of Laniel and Les Lacs-du-Témiscamingue.
- 19 November: The Parish of **Notre-Dame-du-Portage** became a Municipality.

=== 2006 ===
Thirty-four municipality modifications were approved in 2006.

- 1 January:
  - Re-Creation of the City of **Baie-D'Urfé**, the City of **Beaconsfield**, the City of **Côte-Saint-Luc**, the City of **Dollard-des-Ormeaux**, the City of **Dorval**, the City of **Hampstead**, the City of **Kirkland**, the City of **L'Île-Dorval**, the City of **Mont-Royal**, the City of **Montréal-Est**, the City of **Montréal-Ouest**, the City of **Pointe-Claire**, the City of **Sainte-Anne-de-Bellevue**, the City of **Westmount** and the Village of **Senneville** from territories taken from the City of **Montréal**.
  - Re-Creation of the City of **L'Ancienne-Lorette** and the City of **Saint-Augustin-de-Desmaures** from territories taken from **Quebec City**.
  - Re-Creation of the City of **Boucherville**, the City of **Brossard**, the City of **Saint-Bruno-de-Montarville** and the City of **Saint-Lambert** from territories taken from the City of **Longueuil**.
  - Creation of the Municipality of **Saint-Aimé-du-Lac-des-Îles** from territories taken from the City of **Mont-Laurier**.
  - Re-Creation of the Municipality of **Grosse-Île** from territories taken from the Municipality of **Les Îles-de-la-Madeleine**.
  - Re-Creation of the Municipality of **La Bostonnais** and the Municipality **Lac-Édouard** from territories taken from the City of **La Tuque**.
  - Re-Creation of the Municipality of **Lac-Tremblant-Nord** from territories taken from the City of **Mont-Tremblant**.
  - Re-Creation of the Municipality of **Ivry-sur-le-Lac** from territories taken from the City of **Sainte-Agathe-des-Monts**.
  - Creation of the Municipality of **Newport** from territories taken from the City of **Cookshire-Eaton**.
  - Re-Creation of the Municipality of **La Macaza** from territories taken from the City of **Rivière-Rouge**.
  - Re-Creation of the City of **Estérel** from territories taken from the City of Sainte-Marguerite-Estérel.
  - The City of Sainte-Marguerite-Estérel changed its name to **Sainte-Marguerite-du-Lac-Masson**.
- 22 March: Creation of the Municipality of **Cacouna** by the merger of the Village of Saint-Georges-de-Cacouna and the Parish of Saint-Georges-de-Cacouna.
- 22 April: Asbestos Regional County Municipality changed its name to Les Sources Regional County Municipality.
- 14 October: The Parish of **Saint-Roch-de-l'Achigan** became a Municipality.

=== 2007 ===
Six municipality modifications were approved in 2007.

- 1 January: The Township of Granby is annexed by the City of **Granby**.
- 2 June:
  - The Parish of **L'Ange-Gardien** became a Municipality.
  - The Parish of Sainte-Hélène became a Municipality.
- 13 October: The Municipality of **Coteau-du-Lac** became a City.
- 30 November: Creation of the territory equivalent to a regional county municipality (TE) of Eeyou Istchee from part of the existing TE of Jamésie.
- 22 December: The Municipality of Grand-Calumet changed its name to L'Île-de-Grand-Calumet.

=== 2008 ===
Sixteen municipality modifications were approved in 2008.

- 2 February: The Parish of **Sainte-Élizabeth-de-Warwick** became a Municipality.
- 3 May:
  - The Parish of **Saint-Valentin** became a Municipality.
  - The Township of Chester-Est became the Municipality of **Sainte-Hélène-de-Chester**.
- 5 July: The Municipality of L'Île-de-Grand-Calumet changed its name to **L'Île-du-Grand-Calumet**.
- 13 September: The Village of **East Farnham** became a Municipality.
- 27 September:
  - The Parish of **Saint-Stanislas-de-Kostka** became a Municipality.
  - The Parish of **Sainte-Anne-de-Sorel** became a Municipality.
- 11 October:
  - The Parish of **La Présentation** became a Municipality.
  - The Parish of **Sainte-Justine-de-Newton** became a Municipality.
- 18 October:
  - The Parish of **Saint-Ignace-de-Stanbridge** became a Municipality.
  - The Parish of **Saint-Louis** became a Municipality.
  - The Parish of **Sainte-Angèle-de-Monnoir** became a Municipality.
  - The Parish of **Sainte-Sabine** became a Municipality.
- 25 October:
  - The Parish of Saint-Alphonse became the Municipality of **Saint-Alphonse-de-Granby**.
  - The Parish of **Saint-Paul-d'Abbotsford** became a Municipality.
- 15 November: L'Amiante Regional County Municipality changed its name to Les Appalaches Regional County Municipality.

=== 2009 ===
Twenty-two municipality modifications were approved in 2009.

- 1 January: Le Bas-Richelieu Regional County Municipality changed its name to Pierre-De Saurel Regional County Municipality.
- 17 January: The Parish of Saint-Colomban became a Municipality.
- 14 March: The Parish of **Saint-Louis-de-Blandford** became a Municipality.
- 21 March: The Township of **Elgin** became a Municipality.
- 4 April:
  - The Village of **Napierville** became a Municipality.
  - The Village of Saint-Zotique became a Municipality.
  - The Parish of **Notre-Dame-de-Stanbridge** became a Municipality.
  - The Parish of **Saint-Aimé** became a Municipality.
  - The Parish of **Saint-Cyprien-de-Napierville** became a Municipality.
  - The Parish of **Saint-David** became a Municipality.
  - The Parish of **Saint-Robert** became a Municipality.
  - The Parish of **Saint-Simon** became a Municipality.
  - The Parish of **Sainte-Barbe** became a Municipality.
  - The Township of **Saint-Valérien-de-Milton** became a Municipality.
  - The Township of **Sainte-Cécile-de-Milton** became a Municipality.
- 23 May:
  - The Indian reserve of Betsiamites changed its name to Pessamit.
  - The Unorganized Territory of Chute-des-Passes changed its name to Passes-Dangereuses.
- 27 June: The Parish of **Saint-Paul-de-l'Île-aux-Noix** became a Municipality.
- 29 August: The Unorganized Territory of Lac-Fouillac is annexed to the Municipality of Rivière-Héva.
- 16 September: The Municipality of Le Bic is annexed by the City of **Rimouski**.
- 21 October: The Village of Norbertville is annexed by the Municipality of **Saint-Norbert-d'Arthabaska**.
- 1 November: Elections were held in nearly all municipalities of Quebec.
- 7 November: The Parish of **Saint-Hippolyte** became a Municipality.
- 28 November: The Parish of **Saint-Modeste** became a Municipality.

=== 2010 ===
Seventeen municipality modifications were approved in 2010.

- 1 January: The City of Bromont moved from La Haute-Yamaska Regional County Municipality to Brome-Missisquoi Regional County Municipality.
- 30 January: The Parish of **Très-Saint-Rédempteur** became a Municipality.
- 6 February: The Parish of Sainte-Clotilde-de-Châteauguay became the Municipality of **Sainte-Clotilde**.
- 27 February: The Parish of **Matapédia** became a Municipality.
- 24 April: The Parish of **Sainte-Victoire-de-Sorel** became a Municipality.
- 5 May: Creation of the City of Cabano-Notre-Dame-du-Lac by the merger of the City of Cabano and the City of Notre-Dame-du-Lac.
- 8 May: The Cree village of Nemiscau changed its name to **Nemaska**.
- 15 May: The Village of Howick became a Municipality.
- 7 August: The Parish of **Saint-Télesphore** became a Municipality.
- 7 July:
  - The Equivalent territory of Basse-Côte-Nord became Le Golfe-du-Saint-Laurent Regional County Municipality.
  - The Unorganized Territory of Petit-Mécatina moved from Minganie Regional County Municipality to Le Golfe-du-Saint-Laurent Regional County Municipality.
- 4 September: The Parish of Saint-Prosper became the Municipality of **Saint-Prosper-de-Champlain**.
- 30 October: The Municipality of Sainte-Marguerite changed its name to **Sainte-Marguerite–Marie**.
- 13 November:
  - The City of Cabano-Notre-Dame-du-Lac changed its name to **Témiscouata-sur-le-Lac**.
  - The Municipality of **Saint-Colomban** became a City.
  - The Parish of Courcelles became a Municipality.
- 11 December: The Parish of **Saint-Édouard** became a Municipality.

=== 2011 ===
Thirteen municipality modifications were approved in 2011.

- 12 February: Lajemmerais Regional County Municipality changed its name to Marguerite-D'Youville Regional County Municipality.
- 26 February: The Parish of Saint-Onésime-d'Ixworth became a Municipality.
- 14 May: The Parish of **Saint-Jacques-le-Mineur** became a Municipality.
- 16 July: The Parish of **Saint-Samuel** became a Municipality.
- 30 July: The Parish of **Saint-Théodore-d'Acton** became a Municipality.
- 3 September:
  - The Parish of **Saint-Joachim-de-Shefford** became a Municipality.
  - The Parish of **Saint-Patrice-de-Sherrington** became a Municipality.
- 22 October: The Parish of Saint-Joseph-de-Ham-Sud became the Municipality of **Ham-Sud**.
- 5 November:
  - The Parish of **Saint-Sébastien** became a Municipality.
  - The Township of **Hinchinbrooke** became a Municipality.
- 10 December:
  - The Parish of **Saint-Anicet** became a Municipality.
  - The Parish of **Saint-Michel** became a Municipality.
  - The Parish of **Saint-Rémi-de-Tingwick** became a Municipality.

=== 2012 ===
Eight municipality modifications were approved in 2012.

- 18 February: The Parish of Saint-Nérée became the Municipality of **Saint-Nérée-de-Bellechasse**.
- 5 May: The Municipality of Saint-Pierre-de-Véronne-à-Pike-River changed its name to **Pike River**.
- 30 June: The Parish of **Saint-Lucien** became a Municipality.
- 17 November:
  - The Parish of **Saint-Denis-de-Brompton** became a Municipality.
  - The Parish of **Saint-Ignace-de-Loyola** became a Municipality.
  - The Parish of **Sainte-Geneviève-de-Berthier** became a Municipality.
- 8 December: The Municipality of **Sainte-Brigitte-de-Laval** became a City.
- 19 December: Creation of the Municipality of **Saint-Alexis** by the merger of the Village of Saint-Alexis and the Parish of Saint-Alexis.

=== 2013 ===
Five municipality modifications were approved in 2013.

- 19 January: The Parish of **Sainte-Élisabeth** became a Municipality.
- 9 March: Matane Regional County Municipality changed its name to La Matanie Regional County Municipality.
- 22 June: The Parish of **Saint-Lambert-de-Lauzon** became a Municipality.
- 16 November:
  - The Parish of Saint-Denis became the Municipality of **Saint-Denis-de-la-Bouteillerie**
  - The Parish of **Saint-François-Xavier-de-Brompton** became a Municipality.

=== 2014 ===
Eight municipality modifications were approved in 2014.

- 1 January: The Municipality of Baie-James changed its name to **Eeyou Istchee Baie-James**.
- 14 June: The Parish of **Saint-Gabriel-de-Brandon** became a Municipality.
- 13 September: The Municipality of Sainte-Hélène changed its name to **Sainte-Hélène-de-Kamouraska**.
- 1 November:
  - The Parish of Saint-Antonin became a Municipality.
  - The Parish of **Saint-Michel-du-Squatec** became a Municipality.
- 6 December:
  - The Parish of **Calixa-Lavallée** became a Municipality.
  - The Parish of **Saint-Ambroise-de-Kildare** became a Municipality.
  - The Parish of **Saint-Justin** became a Municipality.

=== 2015 ===
Three municipality modifications were approved in 2015.

- 20 June:
  - The Parish of **Val-Racine** became a Municipality.
  - The Township of Maddington became the Municipality of **Maddington Falls**.
- 22 August: The Municipality of **Rigaud** became a City.

=== 2016 ===
Eight municipality modifications were approved in 2016.

- 9 January: The Municipality of **Saint-Honoré** became a City.
- 9 March: The Municipality of Sainte-Anne-du-Sault is annexed by the City of **Daveluyville**.
- 19 March: The Parish of **Saint-Côme** became a Municipality.
- 18 June: The Township of **Natashquan** became a Municipality.
- 24 September: The Parish of **Saint-Gilles** became a Municipality.
- 22 October: The Municipality of **Saint-Philippe** became a City.
- 5 November: The Parish of **Saint-Clément** became a Municipality.
- 10 December: The Parish of **Sainte-Marie-Salomé** became a Municipality.

=== 2017 ===
Six municipality modifications were approved in 2017.

- 13 May: The Parish of **Saint-Liguori** became a Municipality.
- 20 May: The Municipality of **Shannon** became a City.
- 3 June: The Parish of **Saint-Bernard-de-Lacolle** became a Municipality.
- 20 June: The Parish of Sainte-Famille became the Municipality of **Sainte-Famille-de-l’Île-d’Orléans**.

=== 2018 ===
Two municipality modifications were approved in 2018.

- 1 January: Creation of the Municipality of **Laverlochère-Angliers** by the merger of the Municipality of Laverlochère and the Village of Angliers.
- 10 February: The Parish of **Sainte-Ursule** became a Municipality.
- 23 May: The Parish of L'Épiphanie is annexed by the City of **L'Épiphanie**.

=== 2019 ===
Two municipality modifications were approved in 2019.

- 21 September: The Municipality of **Saint-Charles-Borromée** became a City.
- 12 November: The Municipality of **Saint-Amable** became a City.

=== 2020 ===
Four municipality modifications were approved in 2020.

- 4 January: The Municipality of Saint-Roch-des-Aulnets changed its name to **Saint-Roch-des-Aulnaies**.
- 21 March: The Parish of Saint-Simon became the Municipality of **Saint-Simon-de-Rimouski**.
- 30 May: The Parish of **Saint-Mathieu-de-Rioux** became a Municipality.
- 12 December: The Municipality of Saint-André changed its name to **Saint-André-de-Kamouraska**.

=== 2021 ===
Seven municipality modifications were approved in 2021.

- 2 January: The City of Asbestos changed its name to **Val-des-Sources**.
- 17 April: The Parish of **Saints-Anges** became a Municipality.
- 19 June: The Parish of **Saint-Irénée** became a Municipality.
- 28 July: The Regional County Municipalities of Brome-Missisquoi and La Haute-Yamaska moved from the Montérégie region to the Estrie region.
- 18 September: The Parish of **Saint-Paul-de-la-Croix** became a Municipality.
- 4 December: The Municipality of **Saint-Antonin** became a City.
- 18 December: The Parish of Saint-Germain became the Municipality of **Saint-Germain-de-Kamouraska**.

=== 2022 ===
Six municipality modifications were approved in 2022.

- 1 January: The Municipality of Notre-Dame-de-la-Salette moved from Les Collines-de-l'Outaouais Regional County Municipality to Papineau Regional County Municipality.
- 29 January: The Municipality of Saint-Faustin-Lac-Carré changed its name to **Mont-Blanc**.
- 30 July: Robert-Cliche Regional County Municipality changed its name to Beauce-Centre Regional County Municipality.
- 3 September: The Parish of **Saint-Edmond-de-Grantham** became a Municipality.
- 22 October The Municipality of Saint-Georges-de-Clarenceville changed its name to **Clarenceville**.
- 3 December: The Parish of **Saint-Odilon-de-Cranbourne** became a Municipality.

=== 2023 ===
Six municipality modifications were approved in 2023.

- 1 January: Creation of the Municipality of **La Morandière-Rochebaucourt** by the merger of the Municipality of La Morandière and the Municipality of Rochebaucourt.
- 22 July: The Village of **Pointe-Fortune** became a Municipality
- 5 August:
  - The Municipality of **McMasterville** became a City.
  - The Municipality of **Saint-Zotique** became a City.
- 4 November: The Parish of **Brébeuf** became a Municipality.
- 18 November: The Municipality of **Crabtree** became a City.

=== 2024 ===
Four municipality modifications were approved in 2024.

- 1 January:
  - Creation of the Municipality of **Courcelles–Saint-Évariste** by the merger of the Municipality of Courcelles and the Municipality of Saint-Évariaste-de-Forsyth.
  - The Parish of Plessisville is annexed by the City of **Plessisville**.
- 9 March: The Township of Ristigouche-Partie-Sud-Est became the Municipality of **Ristigouche-Sud-Est**.
- 31 July: Creation of the City of **Lac-des-Aigles** by the merger of the Municipality of Lac-des-Aigles and the Municipality of Saint-Guy.

=== 2025 ===
Three municipality modifications were approved in 2025.

- 1 January: The Municipality of Saint-Félix-de-Dalquier is annexed by the City of **Amos**.
- 19 July: The Parish of Sainte-Jeanne-d’Arc became the Municipality of **Sainte-Jeanne-d'Arc-de-la-Mitis** .
- 3 September: The Municipality of Saint-Onésime-d'Ixworth and the Parish of Sainte-Anne-de-la-Pocatière are annexed by the City of **La Pocatière**.

=== 2026 ===
Two municipality modification was approved to date in 2026.

- 1 January: The Municipality of Saint-Bruno and the village of Héberville-Station are annexed by the Municipality of **Hébertville**.
- 4 July: The Parish of **Très-Saint-Sacrement** became a Municipality.

== See also ==
- List of municipalities in Quebec
- List of former municipalities in Quebec
- 2000–2006 municipal reorganization in Quebec
  - 2002–2006 municipal reorganization of Montreal
- 2004 Quebec municipal referendums
