= South Shore (Montreal) =

South Shore Rive-Sud
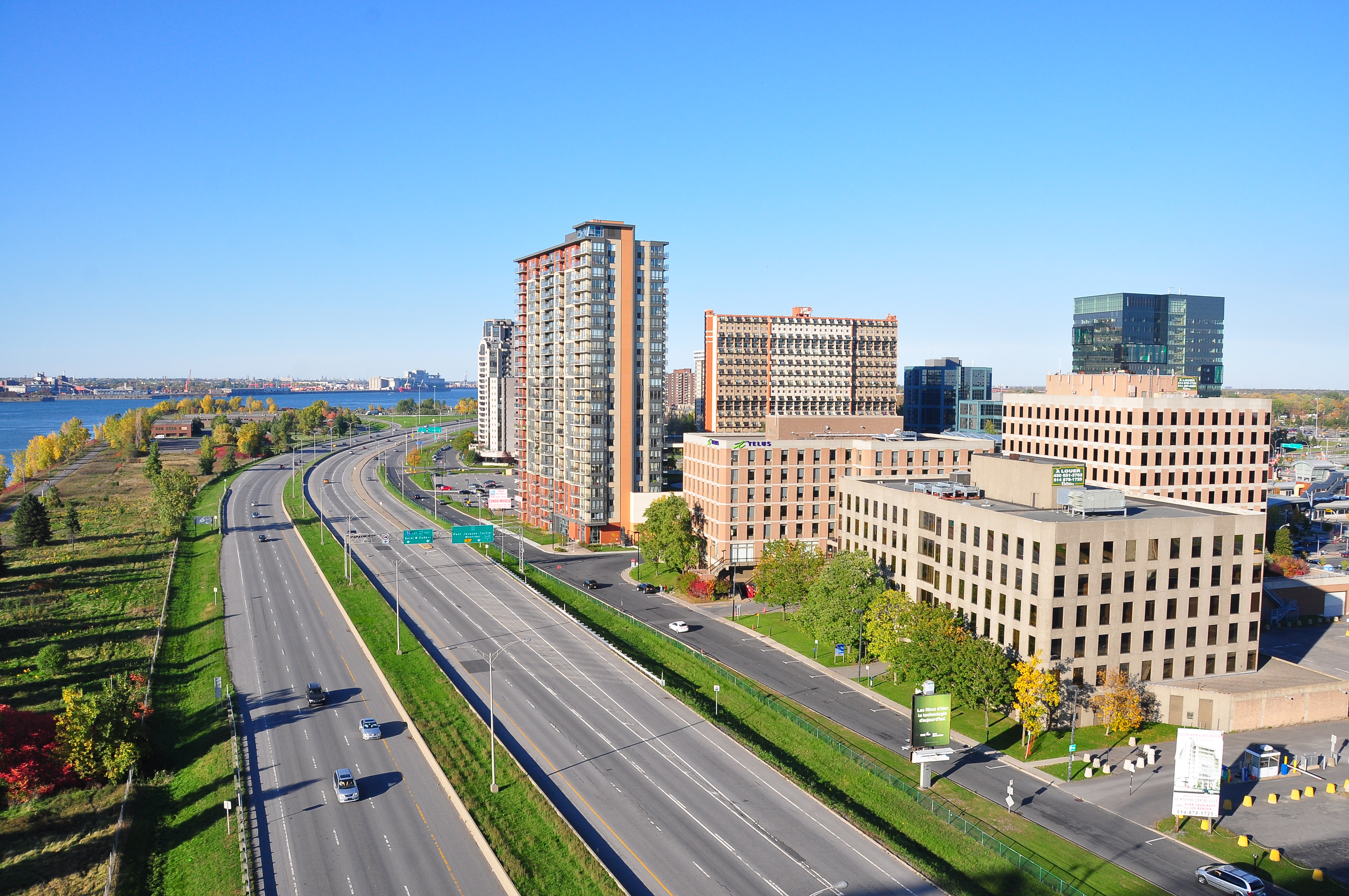
- Longueuil

- Location South Shore (Canada)
- Coordinates: 45°26′06″N 73°27′40″W
- Country: Canada
- Province: Quebec
- Region: Montérégie

Area
  - Total: 1,640.05 km^{2} (633.23 sq mi)

Population (2011)
  - Total: 752,473
  - Density: 458.81/km^{2} (1,188.3/sq mi)
- Time zone: UTC−05:00 (EST)
  - Summer (DST): UTC−04:00 (EDT)
- Postal code span: J
- Area codes: (450) and (579)

The South Shore (French: Rive-Sud) is the general term for the suburbs of Montreal, Quebec located on the southern shore of the Saint Lawrence River opposite the Island of Montreal. The South Shore is located within the Quebec administrative region of Montérégie.

The largest city on the South Shore area is Longueuil.

== Territory ==
The South Shore is not represented by any sort of regional government. This is why its territory does not correspond to precise geographic boundaries. However, in 1998, a group of researchers at the Institut national de la recherche scientifique concluded that the South Shore of Montreal consisted of four Regional County Municipalities (RCM).:

- Marguerite-D'Youville (Boucherville, Varennes, Sainte-Julie, Verchères, etc.)
- La Vallée-du-Richelieu (Beloeil, Chambly, McMasterville, Mont-St-Hilaire, etc.)
- Champlain (Longueuil, Brossard, Saint-Hubert, Saint-Lambert etc.)
- Roussillon (Candiac, Châteauguay, Delson, La Prairie, etc.)

Following the municipal reorganizations in 2001 and 2005, the Champlain RCM evolved into the urban agglomeration of Longueuil, with the municipalities of Boucherville and Saint-Bruno-de-Montarville also added.

Today, there are two distinguishable sub-divisions of the South Shore. These are the urban agglomeration of Longueuil and the Couronne-Sud, which extends from Varennes in the north to Châteauguay in the south, and from Mont-Saint-Hilaire in the east to the urban agglomeration of Longueuil's borders in the west. The entire south shore comprising the urban agglomeration of Longueuil and the Couronne-Sud totals 700,904 inhabitants. The Greater South Shore extends from Sorel-Tracy in the north to Salaberry-de-Valleyfield in the south, and as far as Saint-Hyacinthe in the east, including the agglomeration of Saint-Jean-sur-Richelieu. The Greater South Shore has a total population of 970,779 people. However, at this scale, the proportion of people who commute to Montreal for work declines.

== Included municipalities ==
- Beloeil
- Boucherville
- Brossard
- Candiac
- Carignan
- Chambly
- Châteauguay
- Delson
- Kahnawake (Indian reserve)
- La Prairie
- Longueuil
  - Greenfield Park
  - Saint-Hubert
  - Le Moyne
  - Le Vieux-Longueuil
- McMasterville
- Mont-Saint-Hilaire
- Otterburn Park
- Richelieu
- Saint-Amable
- Saint-Basile-le-Grand
- Saint-Bruno-de-Montarville
- Saint-Constant
- Saint-Isidore
- Sainte-Julie
- Sainte-Catherine
- Saint-Lambert
- Saint-Mathias-sur-Richelieu
- Saint-Michel
- Saint-Philippe
- Varennes

== See also ==
- Greater Montreal
- List of bridges to the Island of Montreal
- List of crossings of the Saint Lawrence River and the Great Lakes
- North Shore (Montreal)
- Quebec Autoroute 10
- Quebec Autoroute 15
- Quebec Autoroute 20
- Quebec Autoroute 25
- Quebec Autoroute 30
