= List of census divisions of Quebec =

Statistics Canada divides Quebec into 98 census divisions largely coextensive with the regional county municipalities of the province (of Quebec's 87 regional county municipalities, 82 have coextensive borders with Statistics Canada census divisions).

Quebec's census divisions consist of numerous census subdivisions. The types of census subdivisions within a Quebec census division may include:

- cities and towns (ville), "ordinary" municipalities (municipalité), parish municipalities (paroisse), townships (canton) and united townships (cantons unis), villages (village)
- Cree villages (village cri), northern villages (village nordique, i.e., Inuit), and one Naskapi village (village Naskapi)
- Land reserved to Crees (Terres réservées aux Cris), Inuit land (Terre inuite), Naskapi land (Terres réservées aux Naskapis)
- Indian reserves and Indian settlements
- Unorganized territories

== List of census divisions ==
The following is a list of Quebec's census divisions, as of the 2011 census.

Name	Code	Notes
Abitibi	2488	
Abitibi-Ouest	2487	Fertility rate (2014) 1.77
Acton	2448	
Antoine-Labelle	2479	
Argenteuil	2476	
Arthabaska	2439	
Avignon	2406	
Beauce-Sartigan	2429	
Beauharnois-Salaberry	2470	
Bellechasse	2419	
Bonaventure	2405	
Brome-Missisquoi	2446	
Bécancour	2438	
Charlevoix	2416	
Charlevoix-Est	2415	
Coaticook	2444	
D'Autray	2452	
Deux-Montagnes	2472	
Drummond	2449	
Francheville	2437	Census division
Gatineau	2481	Territoire équivalent
Joliette	2461	
Kamouraska	2414	
L'Assomption	2460	
L'Islet	2417	
L'Érable	2432	
L'Île-d'Orléans	2420	
La Côte-de-Beaupré	2421	
La Côte-de-Gaspé	2403	
La Haute-Côte-Nord	2495	
La Haute-Gaspésie	2404	
La Haute-Yamaska	2447	
La Jacques-Cartier	2422	
La Matapédia	2407	
La Mitis	2409	
La Nouvelle-Beauce	2426	
La Rivière-du-Nord	2475	
La Tuque	2490	Territoire équivalent
La Vallée-de-l'Or	2489	
La Vallée-de-la-Gatineau	2483	
La Vallée-du-Richelieu	2457	
Lac-Saint-Jean-Est	2493	
Lajemmerais	2459	The RCM is called "Marguerite-d'Youville"
Laval	2465	Territoire équivalent
Le Domaine-du-Roy	2491	
Le Granit	2430	
Le Haut-Richelieu	2456	
Le Haut-Saint-François	2441	
Le Haut-Saint-Laurent	2469	
Le Rocher-Percé	2402	
Le Saguenay-et-son-Fjord	2494	Census division
Le Val-Saint-François	2442	
Les Appalaches	2431	
Les Basques	2411	
Les Collines-de-l'Outaouais	2482	
Les Etchemins	2428	
Les Jardins-de-Napierville	2468	
Les Laurentides	2478	
Les Maskoutains	2454	
Les Moulins	2464	
Les Pays-d'en-Haut	2477	
Les Sources	2440	
Les Îles-de-la-Madeleine	2401	Territoire équivalent
Longueuil	2458	Territoire équivalent
Lotbinière	2433	
Lévis	2425	Territoire équivalent
Manicouagan	2496	
Maria-Chapdelaine	2492	
Maskinongé	2451	
Matane	2408	
Matawinie	2462	
Memphrémagog	2445	
Minganie--Le Golfe-du-Saint-Laurent	2498	Census division
Mirabel	2474	Territoire équivalent
Montcalm	2463	
Montmagny	2418	
Montréal	2466	Territoire équivalent
Mékinac	2435	
Nicolet-Yamaska	2450	
Nord-du-Québec	2499	Census division
Papineau	2480	
Pierre-De Saurel	2453	
Pontiac	2484	
Portneuf	2434	
Québec	2423	Territoire équivalent
Rimouski-Neigette	2410	
Rivière-du-Loup	2412	
Robert-Cliche	2427	
Roussillon	2467	
Rouville	2455	
Rouyn-Noranda	2486	Territoire équivalent
Sept-Rivières--Caniapiscau	2497	Census division
Shawinigan	2436	Territoire équivalent
Sherbrooke	2443	Territoire équivalent
Thérèse-De Blainville	2473	
Témiscamingue	2485	
Témiscouata	2413	
Vaudreuil-Soulanges	2471	

== See also ==
- Types of municipalities in Quebec
- Administrative divisions of Quebec
- List of regional county municipalities in Quebec
- Regional county municipality
