= Îles de la Madeleine (disambiguation) =

Îles de la Madeleine, Îles-de-la-Madeleine, Iles de la Madeleine or Les Îles-de-la-Madeleine may refer to:

- Magdalen Islands (French: les Îles de la Madeleine) in Canada
  - Les Îles-de-la-Madeleine, Quebec, municipality of Magdalen Islands
  - Îles-de-la-Madeleine (federal electoral district)
  - Îles-de-la-Madeleine (provincial electoral district)
  - Îles-de-la-Madeleine Airport
  - Les Îles-de-la-Madeleine Regional County Municipality
  - Urban agglomeration of Les Îles-de-la-Madeleine
  - Gaspésie–Îles-de-la-Madeleine, administrative region of Quebec, Canada
  - Gaspésie—Les Îles-de-la-Madeleine, federal electoral district in Quebec, Canada
  - Bonaventure—Gaspé—Îles-de-la-Madeleine—Pabok, former electoral district in Quebec
  - Bonaventure—Îles-de-la-Madeleine, former electoral district in Quebec
- Îles de la Madeleine (Senegal), uninhabited islands off the shore of Dakar

== See also ==
- Cap-de-la-Madeleine
