= La Région-Sherbrookoise Regional County Municipality =

La Région-Sherbrookoise
- Regional county municipality
- Interactive map of La Région-Sherbrookoise
- Coordinates: 45°25′N 71°54′W
- Country: Canada
- Province: Quebec
- Region: Estrie
- Effective: January 1982
- Dissolved: December 31, 2001
- County seat: Sherbrooke

Government
  - Type: Prefecture

Area
  - Total: 429 km^{2} (166 sq mi)
  - Land: 423.57 km^{2} (163.54 sq mi)

Population (2001)
  - Total: 141,212
  - Density: 333.4/km^{2} (864/sq mi)
  - Change (1996–2001): ▲2.8%
  - Dwellings: 66,818
- Time zone: UTC−5 (EST)
  - Summer (DST): UTC−4 (EDT)
- Area code: 819

La Région-Sherbrookoise was a former regional county municipality in the Canadian province of Quebec. Prior to September 12, 1998 it was known as Sherbrooke Regional County Municipality.

It ceased to exist when most of it amalgamated into the expanded city of Sherbrooke on January 1, 2002.

== Subdivisions ==
La Région-Sherbrookoise RCM consisted of:

- the Municipality of Ascot
- the City of Bromptonville
- the Municipality of Deauville
- the City of Fleurimont
- the City of Lennoxville
- the City of Rock Forest
- the Municipality of Saint-Élie-d'Orford
- the City of Sherbrooke
- the City of Waterville

== History ==
The City of Bromptonville and the Township of Brompton joined Sherbrooke Regional County Municipality on June 12, 1996. Until then, both had been parts of Le Val-Saint-François Regional County Municipality. They merged to form the new City of Bromptonville on December 30, 1998. Bromptonville merged into the new City of Sherbrooke on January 1, 2002 and became the borough of Brompton, but part of the former city was annexed to Stoke instead.

== Dissolution ==
On January 1, 2002, all of the above except Waterville amalgamated into the newly expanded City of Sherbooke, as part of the 2001–2002 municipal reorganization in Quebec. Waterville remained independent and moved to Coaticook Regional County Municipality.

== See also ==
- 21st-century municipal history of Quebec
- Boroughs of Sherbrooke
