= Francheville (census division) =

- Census division
- Interactive map of Francheville
- Coordinates: 46°30′N 72°25′W
- Country: Canada
- Province: Quebec
- Region: Mauricie

Area
  - Land: 1,160.94 km^{2} (448.24 sq mi)

Population (2011)
  - Total: 149,203
  - Density: 128.5/km^{2} (333/sq mi)
  - Change (2006–11): ▲4.1%
  - Dwellings: 73,921
- Time zone: UTC−5 (EST)
  - Summer (DST): UTC−4 (EDT)
- Area code: 819

Francheville (French pronunciation: [fʁɑ̃ʃvil]) is a census division (CD) of Quebec, with geographical code 37. It consists of Les Chenaux Regional County Municipality and the territory equivalent to a regional county municipality (TE) of Trois-Rivières (which is a city and also a census subdivision).

It is named after the former Francheville Regional County Municipality, which was abolished in 2002 when its constituent municipalities were reorganized into their current structure.

The division had a population of 143,267 in the Canada 2006 Census. The 2006 version of Francheville census division differed from the 2001 version in that on January 1, 2002, Saint-Étienne-des-Grès moved from the defunct Francheville Regional County Municipality to Maskinongé Regional County Municipality (thus leaving the census division) and Notre-Dame-du-Mont-Carmel moved from the defunct Le Centre-de-la-Mauricie Regional County Municipality to Les Chenaux Regional County Municipality (thus joining the census division).
