= Rouyn-Noranda Regional County Municipality =

Rouyn-Noranda
- Regional county municipality
- The former Rouyn-Noranda RCM
- Coordinates: 48°15′N 79°02′W
- Country: Canada
- Province: Quebec
- Region: Abitibi-Témiscamingue
- Effective: April 1981
- Dissolved: December 31, 2001
- County seat: Rouyn-Noranda

Government
  - Type: Prefecture

Area
  - Total: 6,632 km^{2} (2,561 sq mi)
  - Land: 5,991.81 km^{2} (2,313.45 sq mi)

Population (2001)
  - Total: 39,621
  - Density: 6.6/km^{2} (17/sq mi)
  - Change (1996–2001): ▼7.1%
  - Dwellings: 18,545
- Time zone: UTC−5 (EST)
  - Summer (DST): UTC−4 (EDT)
- Area code: 819

Rouyn-Noranda Regional County Municipality was a former regional county municipality and census division in the Abitibi-Témiscamingue region of Quebec, Canada.

It was formed in 1981 and dissolved when all of its component municipalities amalgamated into the new City of Rouyn-Noranda on January 1, 2002, as part of the early 2000s municipal reorganization in Quebec.

Based on the last census prior to its dissolution, Rouyn-Noranda RCM consisted of:

Name	Type/status	Land area in km^{2}	2001 population	1996 population
Arntfield	Municipality	396.52	471	433
Bellecombe	Municipality	691.42	731	755
Cadillac	City	366.32	828	930
Cloutier	Municipality	89.78	351	356
Cléricy	Municipality	185.59	481	538
D'Alembert	Municipality	380.74	920	810
Destor	Municipality	258.37	391	445
Lac-Montanier	Unorganized territory	252.63	0	0
Lac-Surimau	Unorganized territory	170.23	0	7
McWatters	Municipality	440.14	1815	1914
Mont-Brun	Municipality	505.08	519	537
Montbeillard	Municipality	308.82	728	677
Rapides-des-Cèdres	Unorganized territory	1019.82	10	0
Rollet	Municipality	382.38	356	408
Rouyn-Noranda	City	348.07	28270	30936
Évain	Municipality	195.90	3750	3892
Totals		5991.81	39,621	42,638

The unorganized territory of Rapides-des-Cèdres was occasionally written as Rapide-des-Cèdres (there is an unrelated Rapide-des-Cèdres which is a hamlet within the municipality of Lebel-sur-Quévillon).

== See also ==
- 21st-century municipal history of Quebec
