= Le Haut-Saint-Maurice Regional County Municipality =

Le Haut-Saint-Maurice
- Regional county municipality
- The former Le Haut-Saint-Maurice RCM
- Coordinates: 47°26′N 72°47′W
- Country: Canada
- Province: Quebec
- Region: Mauricie
- Effective: January 1982
- Dissolved: March 25, 2003
- County seat: La Tuque

Government
  - Type: Prefecture

Area
  - Total: 29,662 km^{2} (11,453 sq mi)
  - Land: 26,350.12 km^{2} (10,173.84 sq mi)

Population (2001)
  - Total: 15,862
  - Density: 0.6/km^{2} (1.6/sq mi)
  - Change (1996–2001): ▼2.6%
  - Dwellings: 6,895
- Time zone: UTC−5 (EST)
  - Summer (DST): UTC−4 (EDT)
- Area code: 819

Le Haut-Saint-Maurice (French pronunciation: [lə o sɛ̃ mɔʁis]) was a former regional county municipality and census division in the Mauricie region of Quebec, Canada. It was formed on January 1, 1982, and dissolved on March 26, 2003, when it was amalgamated in its entirety into the new City of La Tuque. The La Tuque census division, a territory equivalent to a regional county municipality, is contiguous with the former Le Haut-Saint-Maurice RCM.

Based on the last census prior to its dissolution, Le Haut-Saint-Maurice consisted of:

Name	Type/status	Land area in km^{2}	2001 population	1996 population
La Tuque	Ville	579.46	11,298	12,102
La Bostonnais	Municipality	287.37	529	524
La Croche	Municipality	400.56	549	539
Lac-Édouard	Municipality	916.23	137	155
Parent	Village municipality	34.81	326	387
Kiskissink	Unorganized territory	1,860.44	10	14
Lac-Berlinguet	Unorganized territory	939.70	0	0
Lac-des-Moires	Unorganized territory	113.34	0	0
Lac-Pellerin	Unorganized territory	58.70	0	0
Lac-Tourlay	Unorganized territory	38.02	0	0
Obedjiwan	Unorganized territory	7,255.14	64	48
Petit-Lac-Wayagamac	Unorganized territory	644.36	0	0
Rivière-Windigo	Unorganized territory	13,182.20	241	204
Totals *		26,350.12	15,862	16,293

^{* Totals include the three native reserves of Coucoucache, Wemotaci, and Obedjiwan, but were not administratively part of the RCM.}

Following a 2004 referendum, the municipalities of La Bostonnais and Lac-Édouard separated from La Tuque and were reestablished on January 1, 2006. They are no longer incorporated within any regional county municipality, but remains part of the urban agglomeration of La Tuque.

== See also ==
- 21st-century municipal history of Quebec
