= Boroughs of Sherbrooke =

Coordinates: 45°24′N 71°53′W

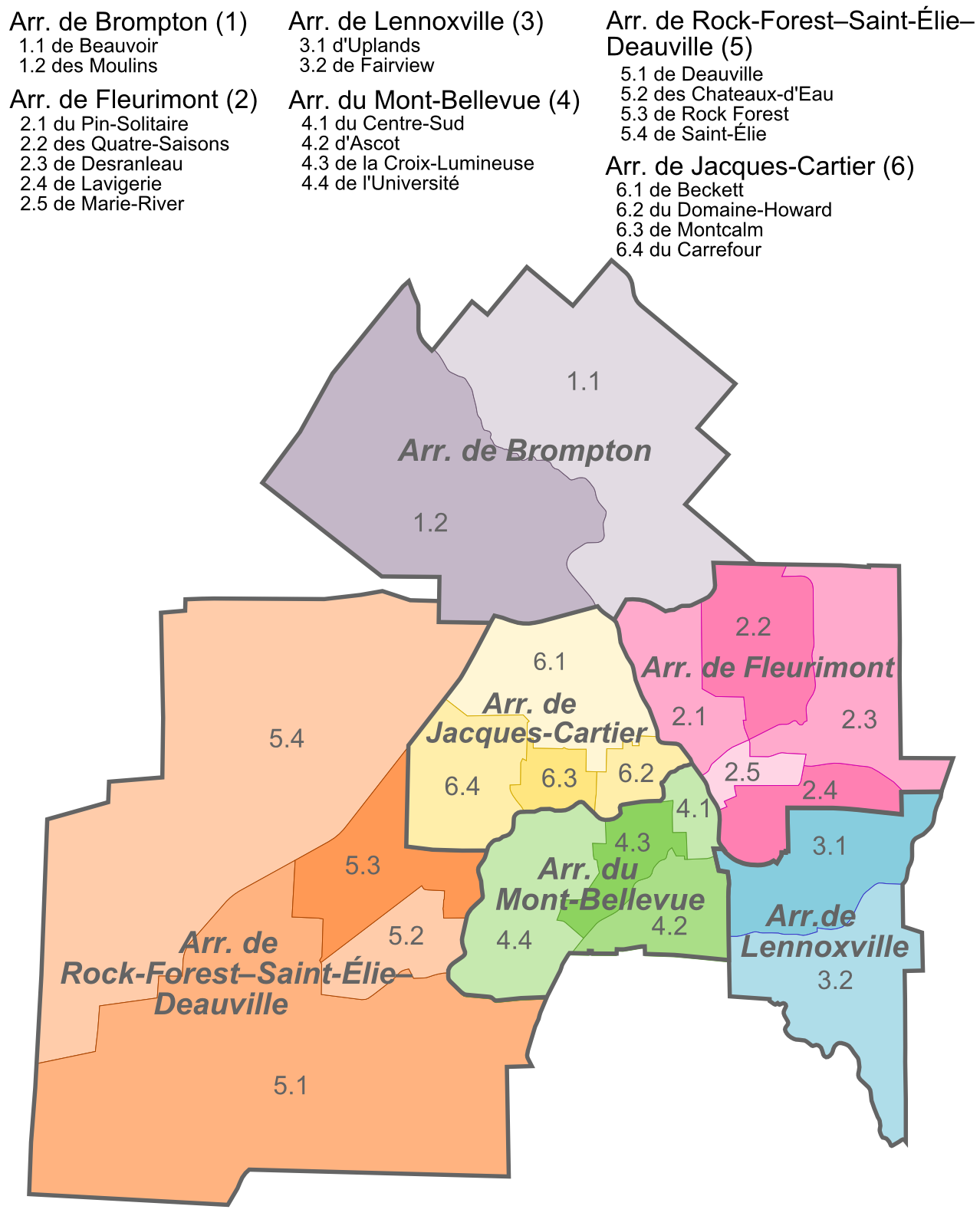

The city of Sherbrooke, Quebec is divided into four boroughs (in French, arrondissements), each with a president and council.

== Powers ==
The borough council is responsible for:

- Fire prevention
- Removal of household waste and residual materials
- Funding of community
- Social and local economic development agencies
- Planning and management of parks and recreational
- Cultural and sports facilities, organization of recreational sports and sociocultural activities
- Maintaining local roads
- Issuing permits
- Public consultations for amendments to city planning bylaws
- Public consultations and dissemination of information to the public
- Land use planning and borough development.

== List of Sherbrooke boroughs ==
Borough	Population	Number of Municipal Councilors
Brompton–Rock Forest–Saint-Élie–Deauville	49,785	4
Fleurimont	47,851	4
Lennoxville	5,642	3
Les Nations	71,836	5

== See also ==
- Municipal reorganization in Quebec
