= Saint-Élie-de-Caxton =

- Municipality
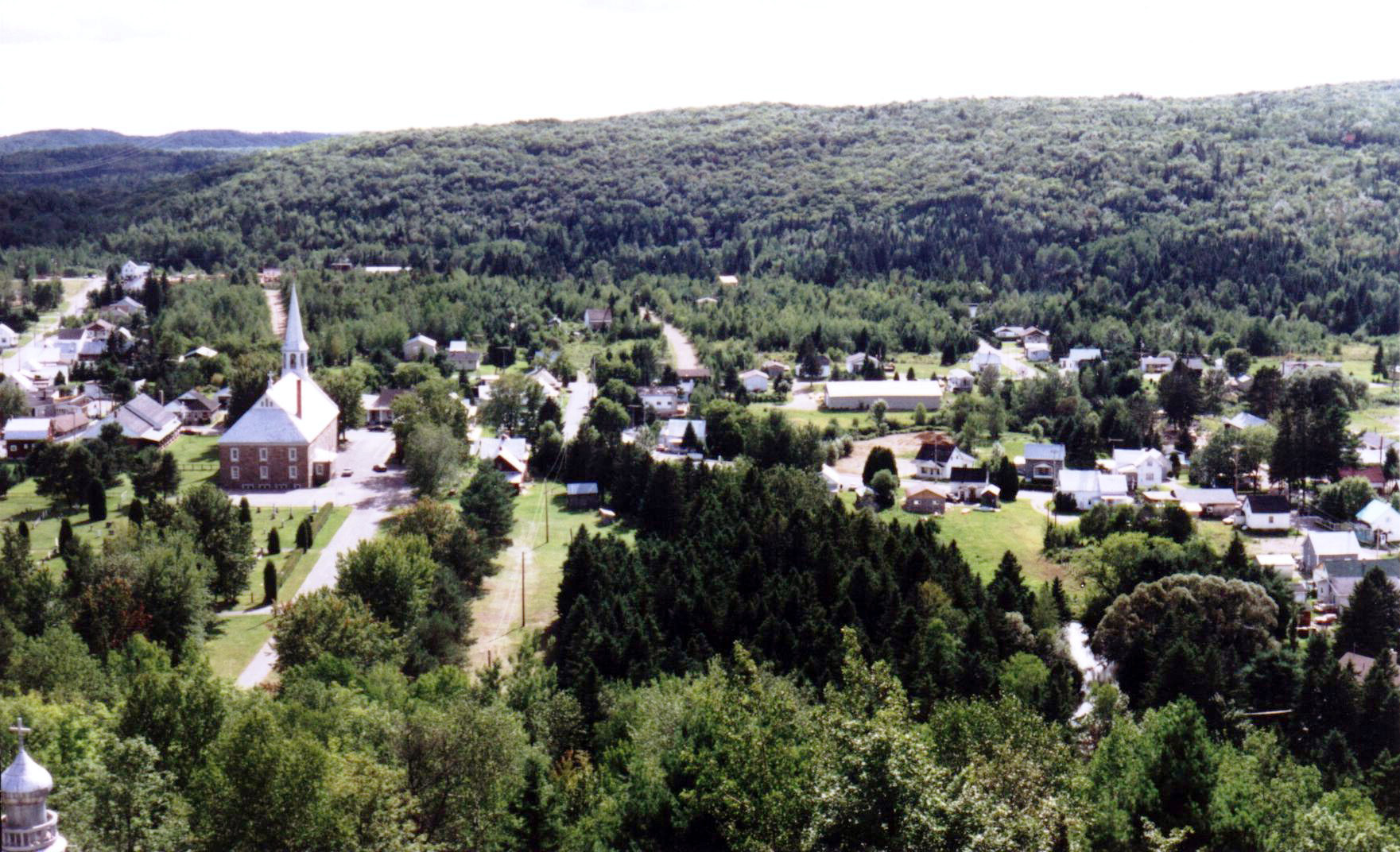
- Motto: Ensemble vers l'avenir ("Together towards the future")
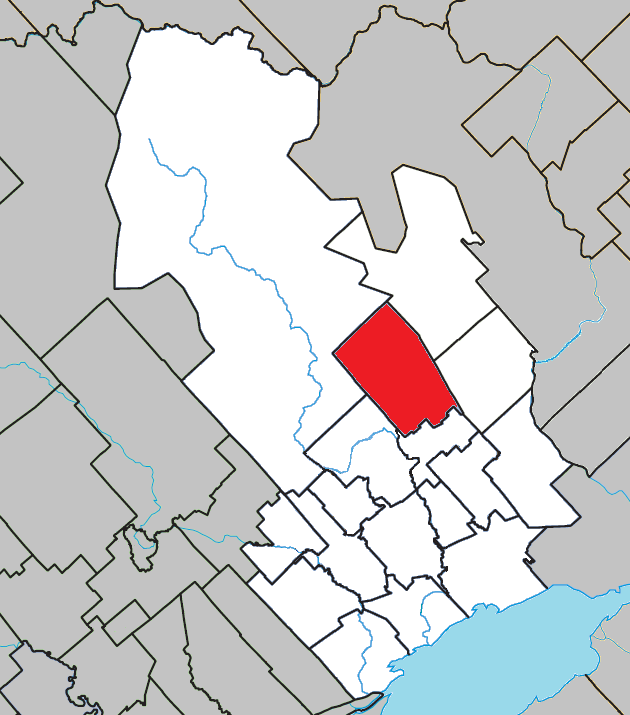
- Location within Maskinongé RCM

- Location in central Quebec
- Coordinates: 46°29′N 72°58′W
- Country: Canada
- Province: Quebec
- Region: Mauricie
- RCM: Maskinongé
- Settled: 1850s
- Constituted: April 12, 1865

Government
  - Mayor: Charline Plante
  - Fed. riding: Berthier—Maskinongé
  - Prov. riding: Maskinongé

Area
  - Total: 130.06 km^{2} (50.22 sq mi)
  - Land: 116.84 km^{2} (45.11 sq mi)

Population (2021)
  - Total: 1,934
  - Density: 16.6/km^{2} (43/sq mi)
  - Change 2016-21: ▲5.3%
  - Dwellings: 1,248
- Time zone: UTC−5 (EST)
  - Summer (DST): UTC−4 (EDT)
- Postal code(s): G0X 2N0
- Area code(s): 819
- Highways: R-351
- Website: www.saint-elie-de-caxton.ca

Saint-Élie-de-Caxton (French pronunciation: [sɛ̃t‿eli də kakstən]) is a municipality in the Mauricie region of the province of Quebec in Canada.

Before January 15, 2005, it was known simply as Saint-Élie.

== Geography ==
Located in the foothills of the Laurentian Mountains, its territory is dotted with lakes. The more prominent lakes are Des Souris, Goulet, and Grand Long Lakes, which are densely lined with summer cottages.

== History ==
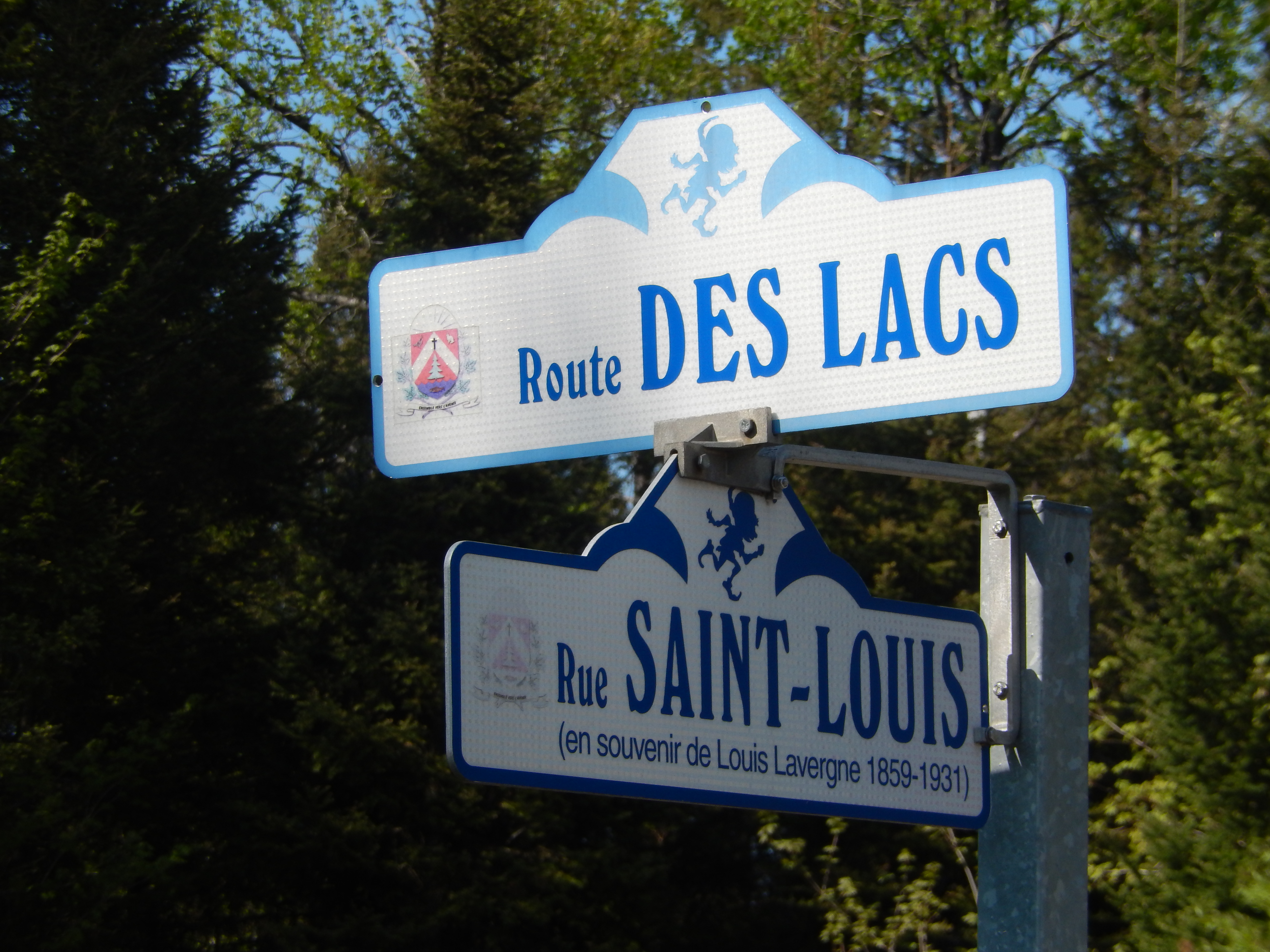
Street signs with lutins on the top.

The Gale and Duberger Map of 1795 already identified the area as Caxton Township, named after an English village situated about 15 kilometers from Cambridge. In 1839, it was officially formed as a geographic township.

Colonization of Caxton Township was delayed because the land sold in 1833 was not yet allocated, with the owners apparently missing. In 1863, it had only 30 families. Two years later in 1865, the Parish and the Parish Municipality of Saint-Élie was formed. It got its name from Joseph-Élie-Sylvestre Sirois-Duplessis (1795–1878), parish priest of Saint-Basile-de-Madawaska (1826–1831), Saint-Stanislas-de-Champlain (1831–1846), and Saint-Barnabé-de-Saint-Maurice (1846–1865), and also one of the first priests of Saint-Élie.

In 1872, the Saint-Élie post office opened.

On December 31, 2001, Saint-Élie was transferred from the Centre-de-la-Mauricie RCM to the Maskinongé RCM, following the formation of the new City of Shawinigan and the dissolution of the Centre-de-la-Mauricie RCM. On January 15, 2005, the Parish Municipality of Saint-Élie became the Municipality of Saint-Élie-de-Caxton.

== Demographics ==
Population trend:

Historical census populations – Saint-Élie-de-Caxton

Year	Pop.	±%
1871	472	—
1881	797	+68.9%
1891	835	+4.8%
1901	1,375	+64.7%
1911	1,281	−6.8%
1921	1,014	−20.8%
1931	995	−1.9%
1941	957	−3.8%

Year	Pop.	±%
1951	947	−1.0%
1956	1,050	+10.9%
1961	1,018	−3.0%
1966	980	−3.7%
1971	995	+1.5%
1976	960	−3.5%
1981	1,078	+12.3%
1986	1,233	+14.4%

Year	Pop.	±%
1991	1,382	+12.1%
1996	1,455	+5.3%
2001	1,541	+5.9%
2006	1,676	+8.8%
2011	1,676	+0.0%
2016	1,836	+9.5%
2021	1,934	+5.3%

Population counts are not adjusted for boundary changes.
Source: Statistics Canada

Private dwellings occupied by usual residents (2021): 927 (total dwellings: 1,248)

Mother tongue (2021):

- English as first language: 1.3%
- French as first language: 97.4%
- English and French as first languages: 0.3%
- Other as first language: 0.8%

== List of mayors ==
The mayor is the municipality's highest elected official. Officially, mayoral elections in Saint-Élie-de-Caxton are on a non-partisan basis.

#	Mayor	Took office	Left office
1	Calixte Bellefeuille	1868	1870
2	Alexandre Lefebvre	1870	1872
3	Frédéric Pellerin	1872	1874
4	Pierre Gagnon	1874	1878
5	Héraclée Beaulieu	1878	1880
6	Joseph Matteau	1880	1881
7	Narcisse Auger	1881	1884
8	Joseph Matteau	1884	1889
9	Pierre Deschênes	1889	1890
10	Alexis Blanchette	1887	1890
11	Élie Héroux	1890	1892
4	Pierre Gagnon	1892	1893
5	Héraclée Beaulieu	1893	1897
12	Narcisse Beaulieu	1897	1898
13	Bélonie Garceau	1898	1899
14	Israël Deschênes	1899	1902
15	Joseph Deschênes	1902	1903
16	Édouard Carufel	1903	1906
17	Philippe Beauchemin	1906	1907
18	Majorique Lafrenière	1907	1909
19	Évariste Beaulieu	1909	1910
20	Paul Garceau	1910	1913
21	Odilon Lamy	1913	1916
22	Elzéard Rivard	1916	1920
23	Edmond Grenier	1920	1921
22	Elzéard Rivard	1921	1923
24	Napoléon Pellerin	1923	1931
25	Arthur Philibert	1931	1933
26	Alfred Gélinas	1933	1935
27	Edmond Samson	1935	1937
28	Nérée Guillemette	1937	1938
29	Zéphirin Garceau	1938	1939
30	Elzéard Rivard	1939	1945
31	Lucien F. Garant	1945	1953
32	William Lafrenière	1953	1961
33	Roland Legris	1961	1965
34	Eugène Philibert	1965	1968
33	Roland Legris	1968	1987
35	Jean-Claude Grenier	1987	1989
36	André Garant	1989	2001
37	Agathe Lampron	2001	2005
36	André Garant	2005	2013
38	Réjean Audet	2013	2017
39	Robert Gauthier	2017	2021
40	Gina Lemire	2021	2022
41	Charline Plante	2023	present

== Notable people ==
Storyteller and musician Fred Pellerin was born in Saint-Élie-de-Caxton, which is the setting of many of his published stories.
