= Mirabel Regional County Municipality =

Mirabel
- Regional county municipality
- Coordinates: 45°39′N 74°05′W
- Country: Canada
- Province: Quebec
- Region: Laurentides
- Effective: 1985
- Dissolved: 2001
- County seat: Mirabel

Government
  - Type: Prefecture

Area
  - Total: 489 km^{2} (189 sq mi)
  - Land: 485.41 km^{2} (187.42 sq mi)

Population (2001)
  - Total: 27,330
  - Density: 56.3/km^{2} (146/sq mi)
  - Change (1996–2001): ▲20.8%
  - Dwellings: 10,067
- Time zone: UTC−5 (EST)
  - Summer (DST): UTC−4 (EDT)
- Area code: 450

Mirabel was a former regional county municipality whose territory coincided with the city of Mirabel, Quebec. It was established in 1985, whereas the city itself had been constituted in 1971.

It ceased to exist by January 1, 2002, in the midst of the early 2000s municipal reorganization in Quebec. Although the city of Mirabel itself was unaffected, legislation gave newly constituted cities arising from that municipal reorganization the powers of a regional county municipality for the purpose of certain laws, and Mirabel got similar powers. Today, Mirabel is not part of any regional county municipality; for statistical and census purposes, it is considered a territory equivalent to a regional county municipality.

== See also ==
- 21st-century municipal history of Quebec
