= Laval Regional County Municipality =

Laval
- Regional county municipality
- Coordinates: 45°35′N 73°45′W
- Country: Canada
- Province: Quebec
- Region: Laval
- Effective: 1979
- Dissolved: 2001
- County seat: Laval

Government
  - Type: Prefecture

Area
  - Total: 245 km^{2} (95 sq mi)
  - Land: 247.07 km^{2} (95.39 sq mi)
- There is an apparent contradiction between two authoritative sources

Population (2001)
  - Total: 343,005
  - Density: 1,388.3/km^{2} (3,596/sq mi)
  - Change (1996–2001): ▲3.8%
  - Dwellings: 135,661
- Time zone: UTC−5 (EST)
  - Summer (DST): UTC−4 (EDT)
- Area code: 450

Laval was a former regional county municipality whose territory coincided with the city of Laval, Quebec. It was established in 1979, whereas the city itself had been constituted in 1965.

While it existed, it was the most populous regional county municipality in Quebec.

It ceased to exist by January 1, 2002, in the midst of the early 2000s municipal reorganization in Quebec. Although the city of Laval itself was unaffected, legislation gave newly constituted cities arising from that municipal reorganization the powers of a regional county municipality for the purpose of certain laws, and Laval got similar powers. Today, Laval is not part of any regional county municipality; for statistical and census purposes, it is considered a territory equivalent to a regional county municipality.

== See also ==
- 21st-century municipal history of Quebec
