= Calixa-Lavallée =

- Municipality
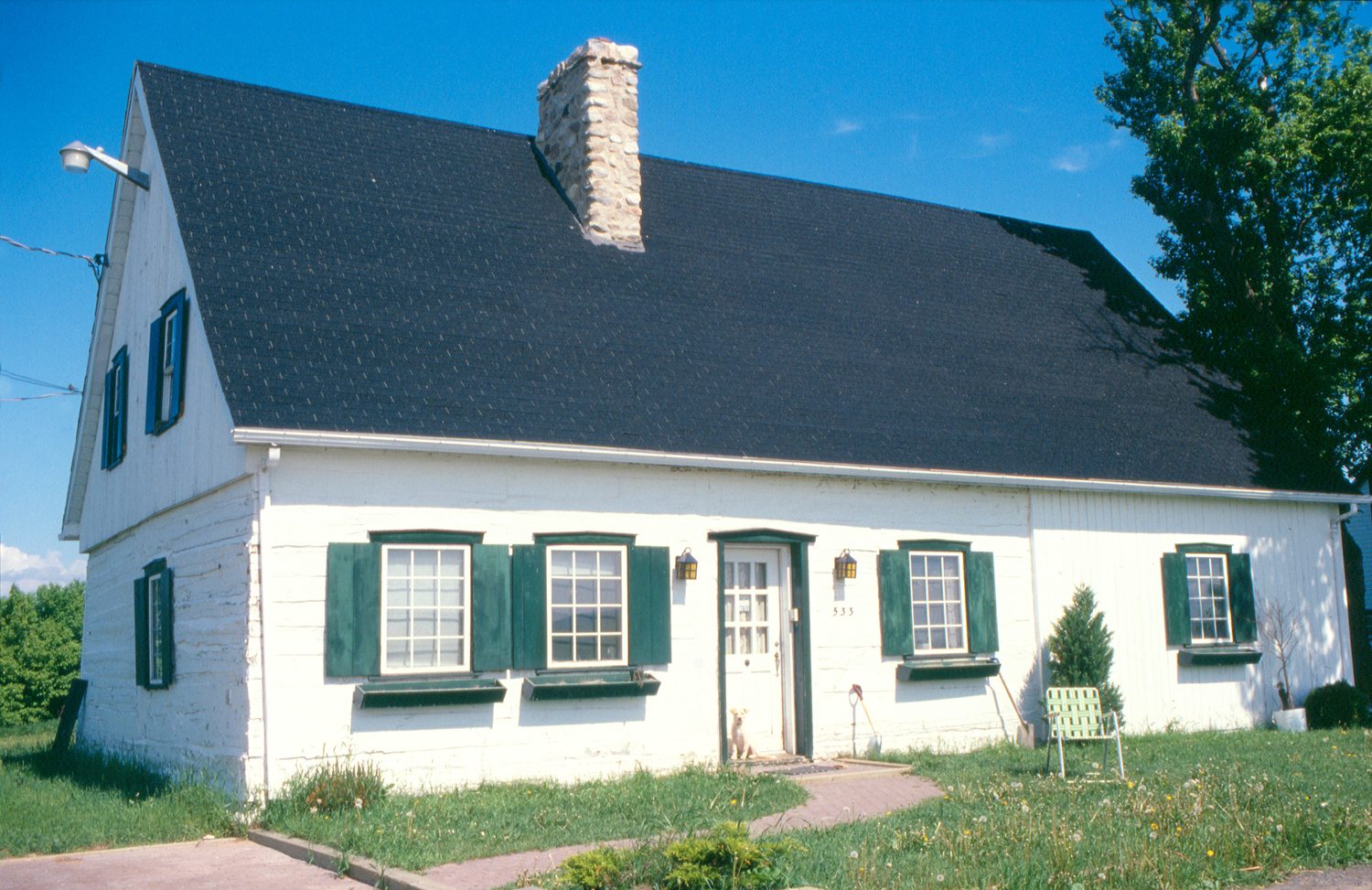
- House in Calixa-Lavallée

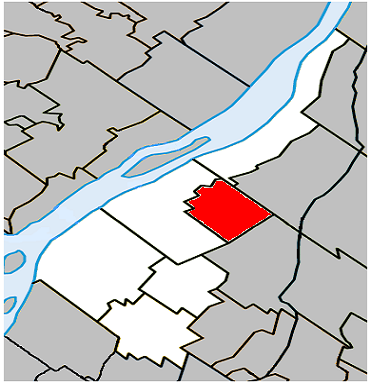
- Location within Marguerite-D'Youville RCM

- Location in southern Quebec
- Coordinates: 45°45′N 73°17′W
- Country: Canada
- Province: Quebec
- Region: Montérégie
- RCM: Marguerite-D'Youville
- Constituted: July 24, 1878
- Named for: Calixa Lavallée

Government
  - Mayor: Daniel Plouffe
  - Federal riding: Pierre-Boucher—Les Patriotes—Verchères
  - Prov. riding: Verchères

Area
  - Total: 32.80 km^{2} (12.66 sq mi)
  - Land: 32.20 km^{2} (12.43 sq mi)

Population (2021)
  - Total: 509
  - Density: 15.8/km^{2} (41/sq mi)
  - Pop 2016-2021: ▼2.7%
  - Dwellings: 220
- Time zone: UTC−5 (EST)
  - Summer (DST): UTC−4 (EDT)
- Postal code(s): J0L 1A0
- Area codes: 450 and 579
- Website: www.calixa-lavallee.ca

Calixa-Lavallée (French pronunciation: [kaliksa lavale]), named for the composer of the same name, is an off-island suburb of Montreal, in southwestern Quebec, Canada, east of Montreal in the Marguerite-D'Youville Regional County Municipality. The population as of the Canada 2021 Census was 509.

On December 6, 2014, Calixa-Lavallée changed from parish municipality to a (regular) municipality.

== History ==
Calixa-Lavallée was originally part of Verchères. This had been granted by Intendant Jean Talon to François Jarret, who thus became Sieur de Verchères, in 1672. It became an independent municipality in 1878 known as Sainte-Théodosie. It now forms part of the Sainte-Marguerite-d’Youville Pastoral Unit, which lies within the Diocese of Saint-Jean-Longueuil.

According to the Commission de toponymie du Québec, from 1946 onwards, the municipality took on a new name: Sainte-Théodosie-Calixa-Lavallée, some 100 years after the birth of the composer Calixa Lavallée, in his honour. Calixa Lavallée (1842–1891), baptised Calixte Pâquet dit Lavallée, is thought to have been born on Rang de la Beauce, on the outskirts of the municipality which, at that time, as not yet been established and was still part of Verchères, which explains why the records list Verchères as his official place of birth.

It was in 1974 that the municipality’s name was changed for the last time to simply Calixa-Lavallée, for a variety of reasons. Firstly, for the obvious purpose of simplification, but also because the similarity between the names Saint-Théodore and Sainte-Théodosie was causing frequent postal errors. Secondly, preparations were underway for the celebrations marking the 100th anniversary of the national anthem ‘O Canada’, composed by Calixa Lavallée. This anthem had been performed in public for the first time in 1880.

== Demographics ==
=== Population ===
Canada census – Calixa-Lavallée community profile

	2021	2016	2011
Population	509 (-2.7% from 2016)	523 (+3.8% from 2011)	504 (-5.4% from 2006)
Land area	32.20 km^{2} (12.43 sq mi)	32.21 km^{2} (12.44 sq mi)	32.35 km^{2} (12.49 sq mi)
Population density	15.8/km^{2} (41/sq mi)	16.2/km^{2} (42/sq mi)	15.6/km^{2} (40/sq mi)
Median age	47.6 (M: 47.6, F: 48.0)	46.7 (M: 46.9, F: 46.2)	44.0 (M: 44.5, F: 43.0)
Private dwellings	220 (total) 212 (occupied)	221 (total)	200 (total)
Median household income	$93,000	$76,032	$77,326

References: 2021 2016 2011

Historical Census Data - Calixa-Lavallée, Quebec

Year	Pop.	±%
1881	546	—
1891	582	+6.6%
1901	532	−8.6%
1911	534	+0.4%
1921	500	−6.4%
1931	485	−3.0%
1941	491	+1.2%
1951	483	−1.6%
1956	458	−5.2%
1961	459	+0.2%
1966	447	−2.6%

Year	Pop.	±%
1971	387	−13.4%
1976	389	+0.5%
1981	436	+12.1%
1986	458	+5.0%
1991	448	−2.2%
1996	467	+4.2%
2001	495	+6.0%
2006	533	+7.7%
2011	504	−5.4%
2016	523	+3.8%
2021	509	−2.7%

=== Language ===
Canada Census Mother Tongue - Calixa-Lavallée, Quebec
Census	Total	French			English			French & English			Other		
Year	Responses	Count	Trend	Pop %	Count	Trend	Pop %	Count	Trend	Pop %	Count	Trend	Pop %
2021	510	495	▼2.0%	97.1%	5	0.0%	1.0%	5	▲ n/a%	1.0%	10	0.0%	2.0%
2016	525	505	▲2.0%	96.2%	5	▲ n/a%	1.0%	0	0.0%	0.0%	10	▲100.0%	1.9%
2011	500	495	▼6.6%	99.0%	0	0.0%	0.0%	0	0.0%	0.0%	5	▲ n/a%	1.0%
2006	530	530	▲7.1%	100.0%	0	0.0%	0.0%	0	0.0%	0.0%	0	0.0%	0.0%
2001	495	495	▲7.6%	100.0%	0	0.0%	0.0%	0	0.0%	0.0%	0	▼100.0%	0.0%
1996	470	460	n/a	97.9%	0	n/a	0.0%	0	n/a	0.0%	10	n/a	2.1%

== See also ==
- List of municipalities in Quebec
