= Champlain Regional County Municipality =

Champlain
- Regional county municipality
- Interactive map of Champlain
- Coordinates: 45°29′N 73°29′W
- Country: Canada
- Province: Quebec
- Region: Montérégie
- Effective: January 1983
- Dissolved: December 31, 2001
- County seat: Longueuil

Government
  - Type: Prefecture

Area
  - Total: 163 km^{2} (63 sq mi)
  - Land: 169.64 km^{2} (65.50 sq mi)
- There is an apparent contradiction between two authoritative sources

Population (2001)
  - Total: 311,838
  - Density: 1,838.2/km^{2} (4,761/sq mi)
  - Change (1996–2001): ▼0.8%
  - Dwellings: 132,367
- Time zone: UTC−5 (EST)
  - Summer (DST): UTC−4 (EDT)
- Area code: 450

Champlain (French pronunciation: [ʃɑ̃plɛ̃]) was a former regional county municipality and census division in the Canadian province of Quebec. It ceased to exist when it amalgamated into the expanded city of Longueuil on January 1, 2002.

It was the smallest in area and most populous regional county municipality.

== Subdivisions ==
Champlain RCM consisted of:

- the City of Brossard
- the City of Greenfield Park
- the City of LeMoyne
- the City of Longueuil
- the City of Saint-Hubert
- the City of Saint-Lambert

== Dissolution ==
On January 1, 2002, all of the above, plus Boucherville (formerly from Lajemmerais Regional County Municipality [now known as Marguerite-D'Youville Regional County Municipality]) and Saint-Bruno-de-Montarville (formerly from La Vallée-du-Richelieu Regional County Municipality), amalgamated into the expanded city of Longueuil. On January 1, 2006, however, Brossard, Boucherville, Saint-Bruno-de-Montarville, and Saint-Lambert demerged and became independent again; however, they remain part of the urban agglomeration of Longueuil.

== See also ==
- 21st-century municipal history of Quebec
