= Francheville Regional County Municipality =

Francheville
- Regional county municipality
- Interactive map of Francheville
- Coordinates: 46°30′N 72°25′W
- Country: Canada
- Province: Quebec
- Region: Mauricie
- Effective: January 1982
- Dissolved: December 31, 2001
- County seat: Trois-Rivières

Government
  - Type: Prefecture

Area
  - Total: 1,125 km^{2} (434 sq mi)
  - Land: 1,137.30 km^{2} (439.11 sq mi)
- There is an apparent contradiction between two authoritative sources

Population (2001)
  - Total: 138,355
  - Density: 121.7/km^{2} (315/sq mi)
  - Change (1996–2001): ▼1.6%
  - Dwellings: 65,022
- Time zone: UTC−5 (EST)
  - Summer (DST): UTC−4 (EDT)
- Area codes: 819 or 418

Francheville (French pronunciation: [fʁɑ̃ʃvil]) was a former regional county municipality in the Mauricie region of Quebec, Canada. Prior to its dissolution, it had an area of 1,124 square kilometres (434 sq mi).

The RCM was dissolved on December 31, 2001, when Saint-Étienne-des-Grès was transferred to the Maskinongé Regional County Municipality, the municipalities of Cap-de-la-Madeleine, Pointe-du-Lac, Saint-Louis-de-France, Sainte-Marthe-du-Cap, Trois-Rivières and Trois-Rivières-Ouest were merged into the new City of Trois-Rivières, and the remaining municipalities became part of the new Les Chenaux Regional County Municipality.

Although the division no longer functions as a regional county municipality in the political sense, the amalgamated city of Trois-Rivières and the regional county municipality of Les Chenaux are still grouped together as the census division of Francheville by Statistics Canada for census purposes. The division had a population of 143,267 in the Canada 2006 Census.

== Subdivisions ==
Prior to its dissolution, the RCM consisted of:

=== Villes ===
- Cap-de-la-Madeleine
- Saint-Louis-de-France
- Sainte-Marthe-du-Cap
- Trois-Rivières
- Trois-Rivières-Ouest

=== Municipalities ===
- Batiscan
- Champlain
- Pointe-du-Lac
- Saint-Luc-de-Vincennes
- Saint-Stanislas
- Sainte-Anne-de-la-Pérade

=== Parish municipalities ===
- Saint-Étienne-des-Grès
- Saint-Maurice
- Saint-Narcisse
- Saint-Prosper
- Sainte-Geneviève-de-Batiscan

== See also ==
- 21st-century municipal history of Quebec
