= Le Centre-de-la-Mauricie Regional County Municipality =

Le Centre-de-la-Mauricie
- Regional county municipality
- Interactive map of Le Centre-de-la-Mauricie
- Coordinates: 46°36′N 72°49′W
- Country: Canada
- Province: Quebec
- Region: Mauricie
- Effective: September 1982
- Dissolved: December 31, 2001
- County seat: Shawinigan

Government
  - Type: Prefecture

Area
  - Total: 1,282 km^{2} (495 sq mi)
  - Land: 1,351.66 km^{2} (521.88 sq mi)
- There is an apparent contradiction between two authoritative sources

Population (2001)
  - Total: 64,841
  - Density: 48/km^{2} (120/sq mi)
  - Pop 1996-2001: ▼3.4%
  - Dwellings: 32,148
- Time zone: UTC−5 (EST)
  - Summer (DST): UTC−4 (EDT)
- Area code: 819

Le Centre-de-la-Mauricie (French pronunciation: [lə sɑ̃tʁ də la mɔʁisi]) was a former regional county municipality and census division in the Mauricie region of Quebec, Canada.

== Subdivisions ==
Prior to its dissolution, it consisted of:

Villes

- Grand-Mère
- Shawinigan
- Shawinigan-Sud

Municipalities

- Charette
- Lac-à-la-Tortue

Parish Municipalities

- Notre-Dame-du-Mont-Carmel
- Saint-Élie
- Saint-Gérard-des-Laurentides
- Saint-Jean-des-Piles
- Saint-Mathieu-du-Parc

Villages

- Saint-Boniface-de-Shawinigan
- Saint-Georges-de-Champlain

== Dissolution ==
The RCM was dissolved on December 31, 2001, when the municipalities of Charette, Saint-Boniface-de-Shawinigan, Saint-Élie, and Saint-Mathieu-du-Parc were transferred to the Maskinongé Regional County Municipality, Notre-Dame-du-Mont-Carmel was transferred to the Les Chenaux Regional County Municipality, and the remaining municipalities were amalgamated into the new City of Shawinigan.

== See also ==
- 21st-century municipal history of Quebec
