= Les Îles-de-la-Madeleine Regional County Municipality =

Les Îles-de-la-Madeleine
- Regional county municipality
- Interactive map of Les Îles-de-la-Madeleine
- Coordinates: 47°24′N 61°48′W
- Country: Canada
- Province: Quebec
- Region: Gaspésie–Îles-de-la-Madeleine
- Effective: April 1981
- Dissolved: December 31, 2001
- County seat: Havre-aux-Maisons

Government
  - Type: Prefecture

Area
  - Land: 205.53 km^{2} (79.36 sq mi)

Population (2001)
  - Total: 12,824
  - Density: 62.4/km^{2} (162/sq mi)
  - Change (1996–2001): ▼7.1%
  - Dwellings: 5,289
- Time zone: UTC−5 (EST)
  - Summer (DST): UTC−4 (EDT)
- Area code: 418

Les Îles-de-la-Madeleine (French pronunciation: [lez‿il də la madlɛn]) was a former regional county municipality and census division in the Gaspésie–Îles-de-la-Madeleine region of Quebec, Canada.

It was formed in 1981, and dissolved when all of its component municipalities amalgamated into the new Municipality of Les Îles-de-la-Madeleine on January 1, 2002, as part of the early 2000s municipal reorganization in Quebec.

Based on the last census prior to its dissolution, Les Îles-de-la-Madeleine consisted of:

Name	Type/status	Land area in km^{2}	2001 population	1996 population
Cap-aux-Meules	Village	3.60	1659	1661
Fatima	Municipality	26.00	2686	2966
Grande-Entrée	Municipality	7.81	660	692
Grosse-Île	Municipality	37.30	543	567
Havre-aux-Maisons	Municipality	39.66	2057	2211
L'Étang-du-Nord	Municipality	25.76	2944	3087
L'Île-du-Havre-Aubert	Municipality	65.41	2275	2618
Totals		205.53	12,824	13,802

Following a 2004 referendum, the municipality of Grosse-Île separated from Les Îles-de-la-Madeleine and was reestablished on January 1, 2006. It is no longer incorporated within any regional county municipality, but remains part of the urban agglomeration of Les Îles-de-la-Madeleine.

== See also ==
- 21st-century municipal history of Quebec
