= Saint-Amable =

- City
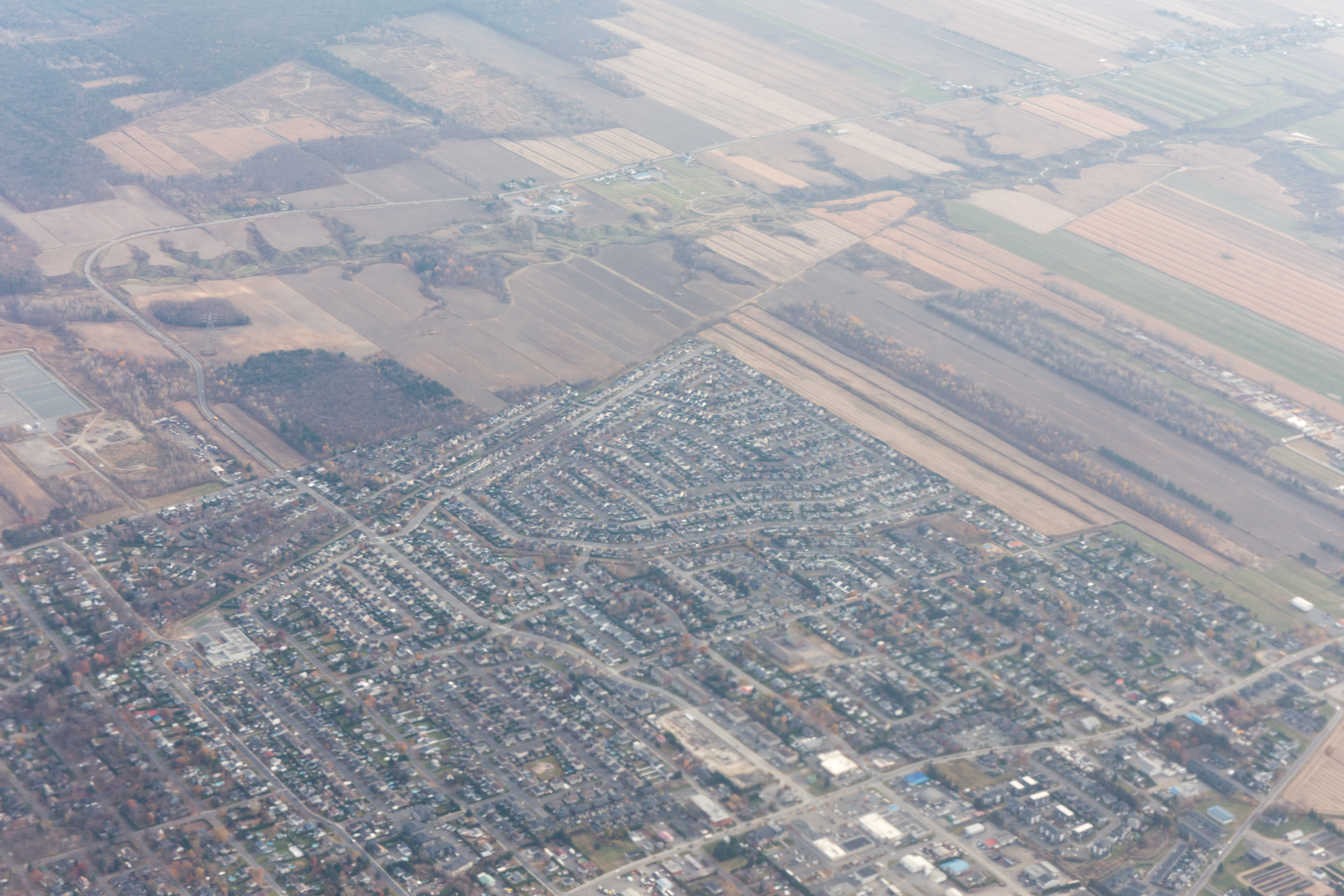
- Aerial view of Saint-Amable

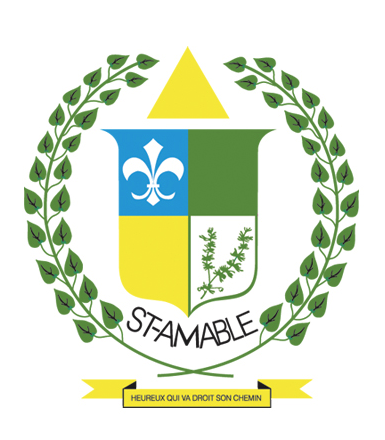
- Coat of arms

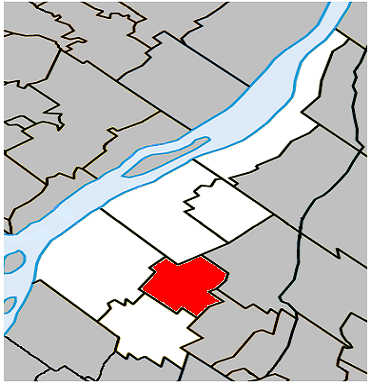
- Location within Marguerite-D'Youville RCM.

- Location in southern Quebec.
- Coordinates: 45°39′N 73°18′W
- Country: Canada
- Province: Quebec
- Region: Montérégie
- RCM: Marguerite-D'Youville
- Constituted: June 13, 1921

Government
  - Mayor: Simon Lacoste
  - Federal riding: Pierre-Boucher—Les Patriotes—Verchères
  - Prov. riding: Verchères

Area
  - City: 37.00 km^{2} (14.29 sq mi)
  - Land: 36.77 km^{2} (14.20 sq mi)
  - Urban: 7.90 km^{2} (3.05 sq mi)

Population (2021)
  - City: 13,322
  - Density: 362.3/km^{2} (938/sq mi)
  - Urban: 11,199
  - Urban density: 1,417.8/km^{2} (3,672/sq mi)
  - Pop 2016-2021: ▲9.5%
  - Dwellings: 5,190
- Time zone: UTC−05:00 (EST)
  - Summer (DST): UTC−04:00 (EDT)
- Postal code(s): J0L 1N0
- Area codes: 450 and 579
- Highways A-20 (TCH): A-30
- Website: www.st-amable.qc.ca

Saint-Amable (French pronunciation: [sɛ̃t‿amabl]) is a town 38.1 km (23.7 mi) east of Montreal in southwestern Quebec, Canada, within the Marguerite-D'Youville Regional County Municipality. The population as of the 2021 Canadian Census was 13,322.

== History ==
The city, founded on 21 June 1921, is named after Amable de Riom, a popular saint from the period of New France (1534-1763).

== Demographics ==
Historical Census Data - Saint-Amable, Quebec
Year	Pop.	±%
1931	675	—
1941	999	+48.0%
1951	1,375	+37.6%
1956	1,634	+18.8%
1961	1,907	+16.7%
1966	2,115	+10.9%
1971	2,392	+13.1%
1976	3,128	+30.8%
1981	4,268	+36.4%
1986	4,531	+6.2%
1991	5,804	+28.1%
1996	7,105	+22.4%
2001	7,278	+2.4%
2006	8,398	+15.4%
2011	10,870	+29.4%
2016	12,167	+11.9%
2021	13,322	+9.5%

In the 2021 Census of Population conducted by Statistics Canada, Saint-Amable had a population of 13,322 living in 5,105 of its 5,190 total private dwellings, a change of 9.5% from its 2016 population of 12,167. With a land area of 36.77 km^{2} (14.20 sq mi), it had a population density of 362.3/km^{2} (938.4/sq mi) in 2021.

Canada census – Saint-Amable community profile

	2021	2016	2011
Population	13,322 (+9.5% from 2016)	12,167 (+11.3% from 2011)	10,870 (+29.4% from 2006)
Land area	36.77 km^{2} (14.20 sq mi)	36.81 km^{2} (14.21 sq mi)	36.68 km^{2} (14.16 sq mi)
Population density	362.3/km^{2} (938/sq mi)	330.6/km^{2} (856/sq mi)	296.3/km^{2} (767/sq mi)
Median age	36.4 (M: 36.4, F: 36.4)	34.9 (M: 35.2, F: 34.6)	33.5 (M: 33.8, F: 33.2)
Private dwellings	5,190 (total)	4,672 (total)	4,122 (total)
Median household income	$92,000	$75,599	$70,325

References: 2021 2016 2011

Canada Census Mother Tongue - Saint-Amable, Quebec
Census	Total	French			English			French & English			Other		
Year	Responses	Count	Trend	Pop %	Count	Trend	Pop %	Count	Trend	Pop %	Count	Trend	Pop %
2021	13,320	12,395	▲6.9%	93.1%	180	▲20.0%	1.4%	130	▲85.7%	1.0%	515	▲68.9%	3.9%
2016	12,170	11,600	▲11.5%	95.3%	150	▼9.1%	1.2%	70	▲75.0%	0.6%	305	▲35.6%	2.5%
2011	10,835	10,405	▲27.7%	96.0%	165	▲73.7%	1.5%	40	▲166.7%	0.4%	225	▲66.7%	2.1%
2006	8,395	8,150	▲14.7%	97.1%	95	▲18.7%	1.1%	15	0.0%	0.2%	135	▲107.7%	1.6%
2001	7,265	7,105	▲2.5%	97.8%	80	▲6.7%	1.1%	15	0.0%	0.2%	65	▼7.1%	0.9%
1996	7,090	6,930	n/a	97.7%	75	n/a	1.1%	15	n/a	0.2%	70	n/a	1.0%

== Economy ==
Within the fertile area between the Saint Lawrence and Richelieu rivers, Saint-Amable has agriculture as its main economic activity.

== See also ==
- List of cities in Quebec
