= Marguerite-D'Youville Regional County Municipality =

Marguerite-D'Youville
- Regional county municipality
- Location in province of Quebec.
- Coordinates: 45°41′N 73°26′W
- Country: Canada
- Province: Quebec
- Region: Montérégie
- Effective: January 1, 1982
- Named for: Marguerite d'Youville
- County seat: Verchères

Government
  - Type: Prefecture
  - Prefect: Suzanne Roy

Area
  - Total: 405.90 km^{2} (156.72 sq mi)
  - Land: 347.10 km^{2} (134.02 sq mi)

Population (2021)
  - Total: 80,313
  - Density: 231.4/km^{2} (599/sq mi)
  - Change 2016-2021: ▲3.6%
  - Dwellings: 32,414
- Time zone: UTC−5 (EST)
  - Summer (DST): UTC−4 (EDT)
- Area codes: 450 and 579
- Website: www.margueritedyouville.ca

Marguerite-D'Youville (French pronunciation: [maʁɡəʁit djuvil]) is a regional county municipality located in the Montérégie region of southwestern Quebec, Canada. The seat is in Verchères.

The RCM was formerly named Lajemmerais Regional County Municipality, after Christophe du Frost de Lajemmerais, the father of Marguerite d'Youville. On February 12, 2011, the name was changed to honour d'Youville directly. However, Statistics Canada retained the name "Lajemmerais" for the 2011 census because the name change came after its reference date of January 1, 2011. Since the 2016 census, the name has correctly been displayed as "Marguerite-D'Youville."

== Subdivisions ==
There are 6 subdivisions within the RCM:

Cities & Towns (4)

- Contrecœur
- Saint-Amable
- Sainte-Julie
- Varennes

Municipalities (2)

- Calixa-Lavallée
- Verchères

Former municipalities

- Boucherville (now part of the Urban agglomeration of Longueuil)

== Demographics ==
=== Population ===
Canada census – Marguerite-D'Youville community profile

	2021	2016	2011
Population	80,313 (+3.6% from 2016)	77,550 (+4.2% from 2011)	74,416 (+6.5% from 2006)
Land area	347.10 km^{2} (134.02 sq mi)	346.04 km^{2} (133.61 sq mi)	345.55 km^{2} (133.42 sq mi)
Population density	231.4/km^{2} (599/sq mi)	224.1/km^{2} (580/sq mi)	215.4/km^{2} (558/sq mi)
Median age	41.6 (M: 40.8, F: 42.0)	40.1 (M: 39.6, F: 40.6)	38.6 (M: 38.0, F: 39.1)
Private dwellings	32,414 (total) 31,848 (occupied)	30,532 (total)	28,622 (total)
Median household income	$98,000	$84,387	$77,652

References: 2021 2016 2011

Historical Census Data - Marguerite-D'Youville Regional County Municipality, Quebec

Year	Pop.	±%
1991	85,720	—
1996	95,618	+11.5%
2001	100,263	+4.9%

Year	Pop.	±%
2001A	64,010	−36.2%
2006	69,881	+9.2%
2011	74,416	+6.5%

Year	Pop.	±%
2016	77,550	+4.2%
2021	80,313	+3.6%

(A) adjustment due to boundary change.

=== Language ===
Canada Census Mother Tongue - Marguerite-D'Youville Regional County Municipality, Quebec
Census	Total	French			English			French & English			Other		
Year	Responses	Count	Trend	Pop %	Count	Trend	Pop %	Count	Trend	Pop %	Count	Trend	Pop %
2021	79,570	74,245	▲0.9%	93.3%	1,225	▲11.9%	1.5%	790	▲10.5%	1.0%	2,730	▲46.0%	3.4%
2016	77,295	73,615	▲3.5%	95.2%	1,095	▼4.3%	1.4%	715	▲83.4%	0.9%	1,870	▲32.15%	2.4%
2011	74,070	71,120	▲6.2%	96.0%	1,145	▲18.0%	1.5%	390	▲136.4%	0.5%	1,415	▲2.9%	1.9%
2006	69,485	66,975	▼29.8%	96.4%	970	▼44.7%	1.4%	165	▼67.3%	0.2%	1,375	▼16.9%	2.0%
2001	99,385	95,470	▲3.7%	96.1%	1,755	▼2.2%	1.8%	505	▲31.2%	0.5%	1,655	▲271.9%	1.7%
1996	94,720	92,095	n/a	97.2%	1,795	n/a	1.9%	385	n/a	0.4%	445	n/a	0.5%

== Transportation ==
=== Access Routes ===
Highways and numbered routes that run through the municipality, including external routes that start or finish at the county border:

- Autoroutes
  - A-20 (TCH)
  - A-30
- Principal Highways
  - R-132
  - R-133
  - R-137
- Secondary Highways
  - None
- External Routes
  - None

== See also ==
- List of regional county municipalities and equivalent territories in Quebec
