= Mascouche (disambiguation) =

Mascouche is a city in Lanaudière, Quebec, Canada.

Mascouche may also refer to:

- Mascouche station, a commuter rail station in Mascouche, Quebec
- Mascouche River, a river in Lanaudière, Quebec
