= Saint Pierre River =

Saint Pierre River or Saint-Pierre River may refer to:

- Saint Pierre River (Matapedia River tributary), in Sayabec, Quebec, Canada (see List of rivers of Quebec#Restigouche River watershed (left bank – part in Quebec))
- Saint Pierre River (Mascouche), a tributary of the Mascouche River in Mascouche, Quebec, Canada
- Saint Pierre River (Mirabel), a tributary of the Mascouche River in Mirabel, Quebec, Canada
- Saint-Pierre River (Mitis River tributary), in Lac-à-la-Croix, Quebec, Canada (see List of rivers of Quebec#Watershed of La Mitis and Eastern tributaries)
- Saint Pierre River (Montreal), a former stream in Montreal, Quebec, Canada
- Saint-Pierre River (Pentecôte River tributary), in Port-Cartier, Quebec, Canada (see List of rivers of Quebec#North-shore Manicouagan River and tributaries eastward)
- Saint-Pierre River (Saint-Régis River tributary), in Saint-Constant, Quebec, Canada

== See also ==
- Pierre River (disambiguation)
- Jean-Pierre River
- Pierre-Paul River
- Rivière-à-Pierre
