= Saint Pierre River (Mascouche) =

Location
- Country: Canada
- Province: Quebec

Physical characteristics
- Source
  - location: Sainte-Anne-des-Plaines
  - coordinates: 45°46′39″N 73°48′26″W
  - elevation: 60 m (200 ft)
- Mouth
  - location: Mascouche River
  - coordinates: 45°45′27″N 73°39′33″W
  - elevation: 26 m (85 ft)
- Length: 16.2 km (10.1 mi)

Basin features
- Tributaries
  - left: Lamoureux Therrien Creek, Black Creek.
  - right: Lauzon Creek-Therrien.

The Saint Pierre River is a tributary of the Mascouche River, flowing in the southwest of Quebec, in Canada. This river crosses administrative regions:

- Laurentides: Thérèse-De Blainville Regional County Municipality; municipality of Sainte-Anne-des-Plaines;
- Lanaudière: Les Moulins Regional County Municipality; sector La Plaine of the city of Terrebonne and the city of Mascouche.

This river runs eastward from an agricultural plain at the north side of several urban areas, in parallel with the Rivière des Mille Îles.

== Geography ==
St. Pierre River rises on the north side of the village of Sainte-Anne-des-Plaines. This source is located at:

- 1.5 kilometres (0.93 mi) north-west of Rivière des Mille Îles;
- 2.6 kilometres (1.6 mi) north-east of the airport terminal to the Mirabel Airport;
- 11.1 kilometres (6.9 mi) northwest from the confluence of the Saint Pierre River.

Course of the river

From its source, the Saint Pierre River flows on 16.2 kilometres (10.1 mi), according to the following segments:

- 2.6 kilometres (1.6 mi) north-east to the edge of the town of Mascouche (Les Moulins Regional County Municipality);
- 1.1 kilometres (0.68 mi) to the northeast in the La Plaine of the city of Terrebonne, to the main street of the village "La Plaine";
- 5.8 kilometres (3.6 mi) eastward to the main road serving the village "Domaine du Boisé";
- 6.7 kilometres (4.2 mi) (or 3.5 kilometres (2.2 mi) in direct line). In the city of Mascouche, winding up to the confluence of the river

The confluence of the Saint Pierre River empties into a river bend on the north bank of the Mascouche River, is north of the urban area of the city of Mascouche.

== Toponymy ==
On the Christian origin, the place name is known since the beginning of the concession of the Seigneurie des Plaines, circa 1731. The settlers began clearing lots before 1740 along the St. Pierre River, which allowed a winter ice road before the development of roads along the river. This name is attested the first time in 1853 with exact location on the map of Francis Joseph Bouchette. The erection of documents of the parish of Mascouche, 1829-1831, indicate that the St. Pierre River has been designated "Ruisseau de la Plaine". Joseph Bouchette map of 1831 indicates that stream "Riv. St Mary ", echoing the designation appearing in a confession and enumeration of Seigneurie de Terrebonne in 1736.

The place name "Saint Pierre River" was formalized December 5, 1968, at the Bank of place names of Commission de toponymie du Québec (Quebec Geographical Names Board).

== See also ==
- Sainte-Anne-des-Plaines, a municipality
- La Plaine, an area of the city of Terrebonne
- Terrebonne, a city of the north shore of Montreal
- Mascouche, a city
- Les Moulins Regional County Municipality (RCM)
- Mascouche River, a stream
- Rivière des Mille Îles, a stream
- List of rivers of Quebec
