= Terrebonne, Quebec =

Terrebonne
- City
- Ville de Terrebonne
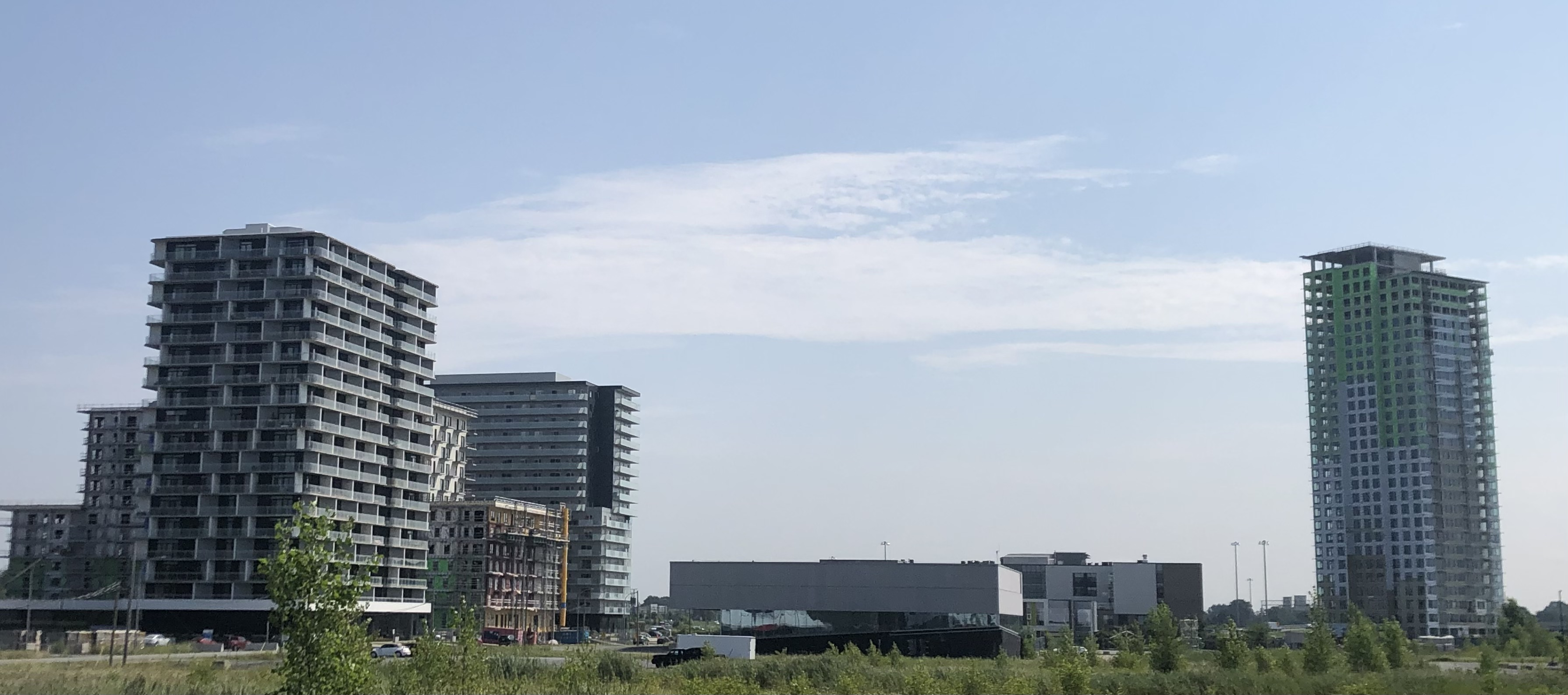
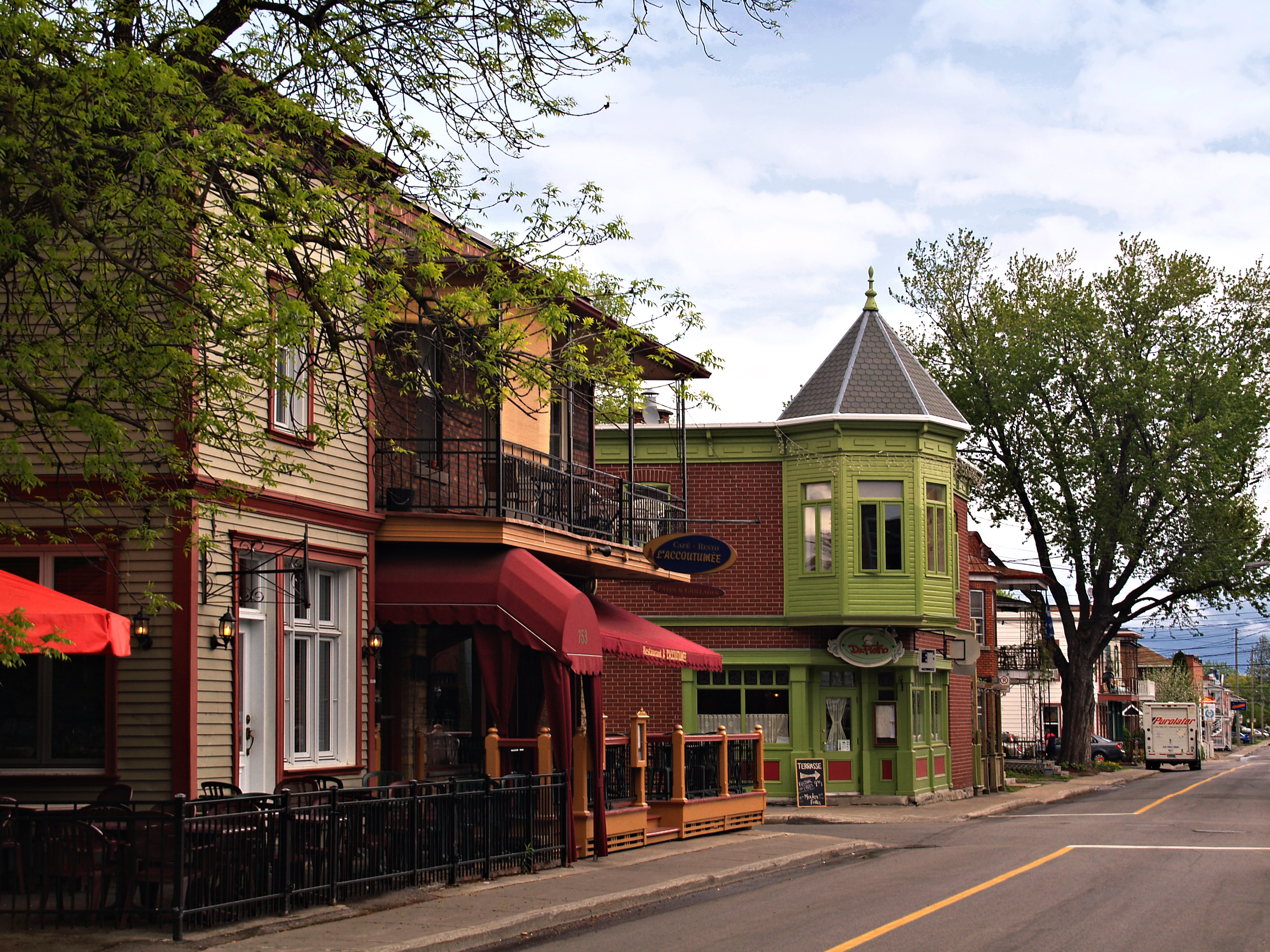
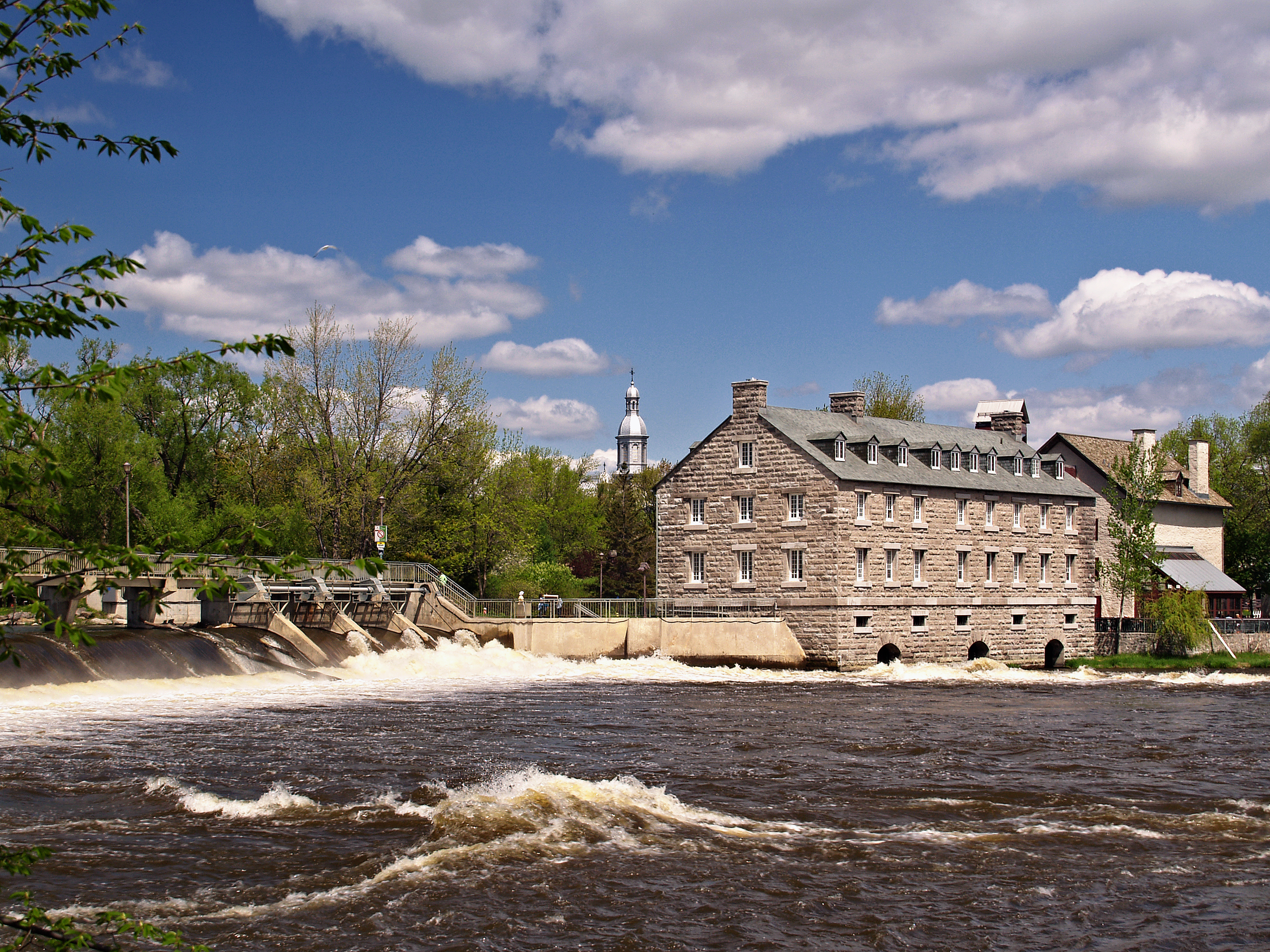
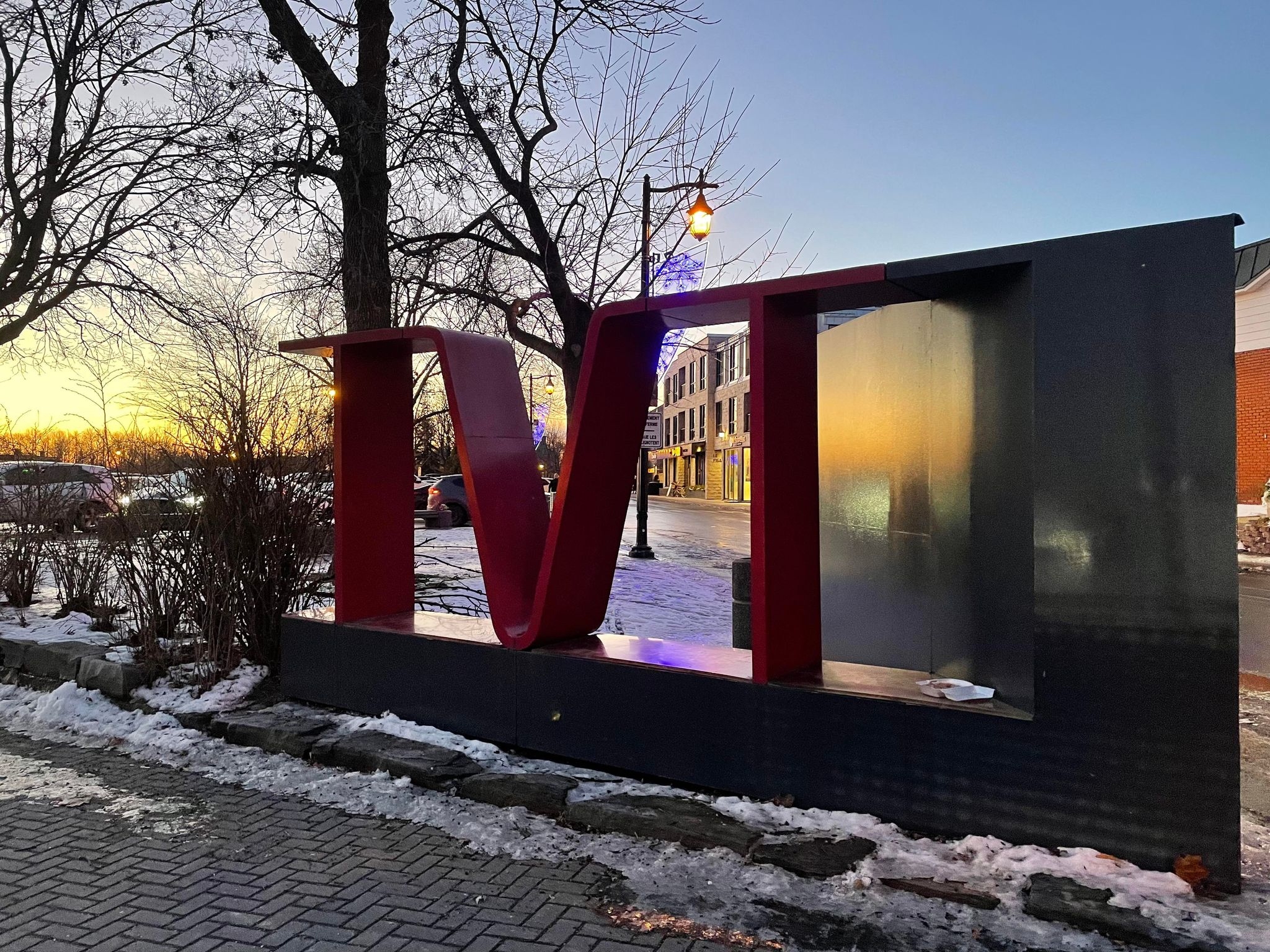

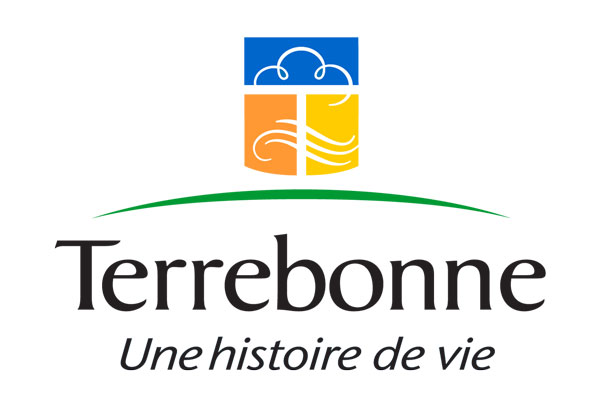
- Coat of arms Logo
- Motto: Patriae Decoratus Amore
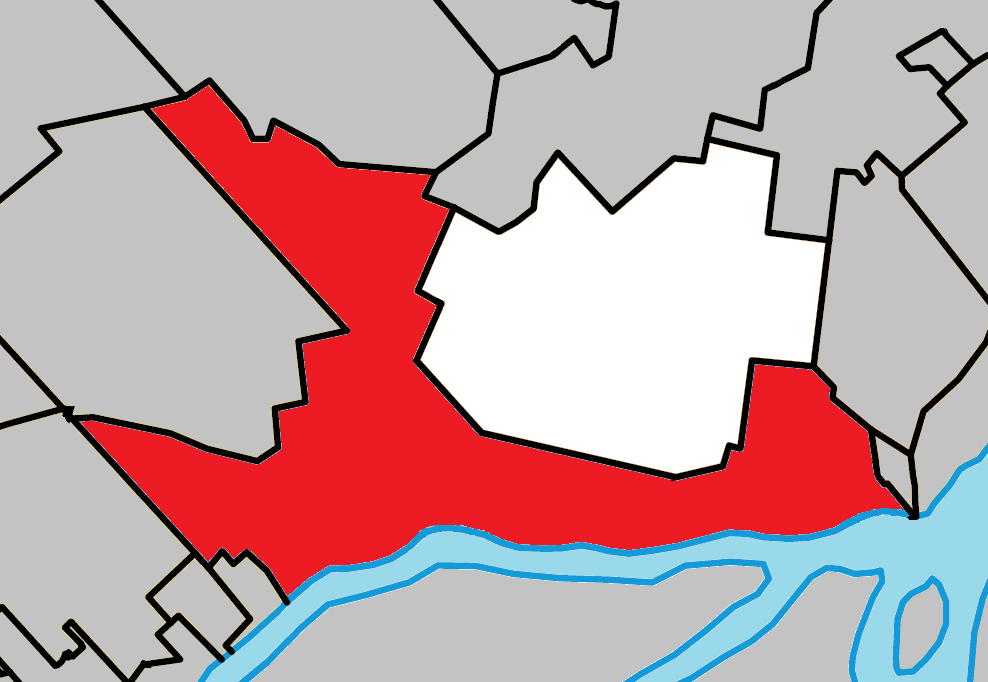
- Location (red) within Les Moulins RCM.

- Location in central Quebec. Location of Terrebonne in Greater Montreal
- Coordinates: 45°42′N 73°38′W
- Country: Canada
- Province: Quebec
- Region: Lanaudière
- RCM: Les Moulins
- Settled: 1673
- Constituted: June 27, 2001

Government
  - Mayor: Mathieu Traversy
  - Governing Body: Terrebonne City Council
  - Federal riding: Terrebonne
  - Prov. riding: L'Assomption / Masson / Terrebonne

Area
  - Total: 158.60 km^{2} (61.24 sq mi)
  - Land: 153.76 km^{2} (59.37 sq mi)

Population (2021)
  - Total: 119,944
  - Rank: 10th in Quebec
  - Density: 780.1/km^{2} (2,020/sq mi)
  - Pop 2016–2021: ▲7.5%
- Time zone: UTC−5 (EST)
  - Summer (DST): UTC−4 (EDT)
- Postal code(s): J6V to J6Y, J7M
- Area codes: 450 and 579
- Highways A-25 A-640 A-40: R-125; R-337; R-344
- Website: www.ville. terrebonne.qc.ca

Terrebonne (French pronunciation: [tɛʁbɔn]) is an off-island suburb of Montreal, in southwestern Quebec, Canada. It is located in the North Shore region of the Montreal area, north of Laval across the Rivière des Mille-Îles.

This city is divided into three sectors, namely Lachenaie, La Plaine and Terrebonne. In the past, these sectors were distinct cities. However, on 22 August 2001, they merged under the name of Terrebonne. According to the 2021 Canadian Census Terrebonne has a population of 119,944, making it Montreal's third largest suburb and the largest city on the North Shore.

== History ==
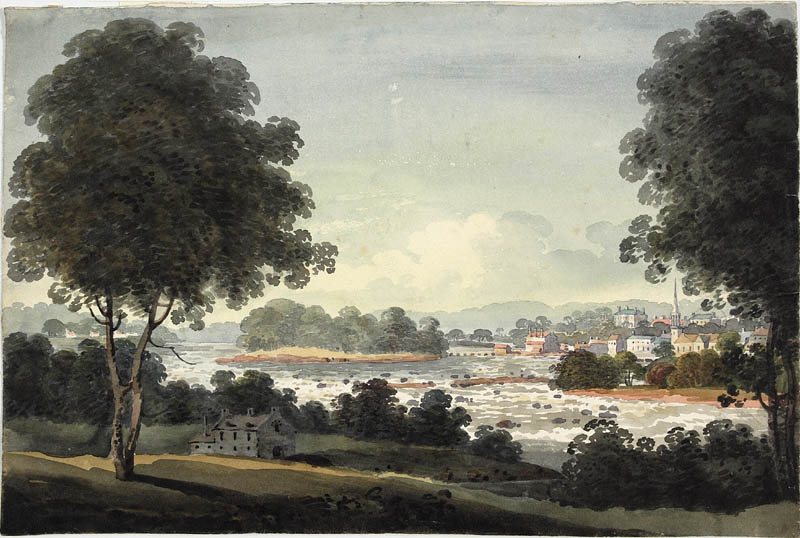
Terrebonne in 1810

The town of Lachenaie, which was founded in 1683 by Lord Charles Aubert de Lachenaye, is the oldest of the three towns that were merged. Some natives were already present on this territory at the time. The colonisation really started in 1647 when Lachenaie was merged with the Repentigny Seigniory. Louis Lepage de Ste-Claire, priest, canon, and the son of René Lepage de Sainte-Claire, acquired the Seigniory of Terrebonne on 2 September 1720. Abbot Louis Lepage de Ste-Claire built the first church in 1734 and the first manor in 1735. A few years later, Abbot Lepage equipped the town with both a saw mill and a flour mill. The philanthropist Sophie Masson was seigneuress of Terrebonne from 1847 to 1883.

The town of La Plaine was founded in 1830 on fragments of other towns, namely Mascouche, Sainte-Anne-des-Plaines, Saint-Lin, and Terrebonne. At that time, the lords of Terrebonne and Lachenaie built the road named "chemin de la Grande Ligne" to join the two towns. It is now called the boulevard Laurier. In 1877, the rail system was developed and stimulated the economic growth. The village of Saint-Joachim was founded during that time, which was later, in 1920, to be renamed La Plaine.

The first lord of Terrebonne was André Daulier-Deslandes, who was granted his title in 1673. Following the construction of the first wooden bridge in 1834, two main areas emerged. The commercial area was Terrebonne, while the agricultural one was Saint-Louis de Terrebonne. Terrebonne became incorporated as a city in 1860 and again in 1985 after the merger with the parish of Saint-Louis de Terrebonne.

At the time of the municipal merger in late August 2001, Lachenaie had over 20,000 residents, La Plaine had 17,000 residents, and Terrebonne had almost 46,000 residents. This merger made Terrebonne the 10th largest city in Quebec. Ten years later, the city had around 106,322 citizens on 154.6 km^{2} (59.7 sq mi) of land, according to the 2011 Canadian Census.

== Geography ==
Terrebonne, like nearby Montréal city, has the same humid continental climate (warm summer subtype, Köppen climate classification Dfb), with warm or hot humid summers and cold winters. Temperature ranges in terrebone on average range from as low as -30 °C (-23 °F) and as high as 35 °C (95 °F) but those extremes are rare, the high of 36.7 °C (98.1 °F) on August 1, 1975, and a low of −37.2 °C (−35.0 °F) on January 15, 1957, were recorded in Terrebonne

=== Climate ===
Climate data for Terrebonne (not counting La Plaine Lachenaie and Saint-Louis-de-Terrebonne (Terrebonne) Climate ID: 7025280; coordinates 45°30′N 73°35′W; elevation: 60.0 m (196.9 ft); 1981−2010 normals, extremes 1871–present (Note: Extreme high and low temperatures in the table below are from Terrebonne (July 1871 to March 1993) and McTavish (July 1994 to present).)
Month	Jan	Feb	Mar	Apr	May	Jun	Jul	Aug	Sep	Oct	Nov	Dec	Year
Record high °C (°F)	14.5 (58.1)	12.0 (53.6)	26.3 (79.3)	30.1 (86.2)	35.0 (95.0)	34.7 (94.5)	36.4 (97.5)	36.7 (98.1)	34.5 (94.1)	29.0 (84.2)	22.2 (72.0)	17.0 (62.6)	36.7 (98.1)
Mean daily maximum °C (°F)	−3.5 (25.7)	−2.2 (28.0)	3.8 (38.8)	12.1 (53.8)	20.0 (68.0)	25.5 (77.9)	27.2 (81.0)	26.4 (79.5)	22.4 (72.3)	14.3 (57.7)	7.1 (44.8)	−1.3 (29.7)	11.1 (52.0)
Daily mean °C (°F)	−9.65 (14.63)	−8 (18)	−1.6 (29.1)	6.25 (43.25)	13.85 (56.93)	19.35 (66.83)	21.75 (71.15)	20.65 (69.17)	16.6 (61.9)	9.15 (48.47)	2.2 (36.0)	−4.8 (23.4)	7.1 (44.8)
Mean daily minimum °C (°F)	−16.3 (2.7)	−13.8 (7.2)	−7 (19)	0.4 (32.7)	7.7 (45.9)	13.2 (55.8)	16.5 (61.7)	14.9 (58.8)	10.8 (51.4)	4 (39)	−2.1 (28.2)	−8.9 (16.0)	3.6 (38.5)
Record low °C (°F)	−38.0 (−36.4)	−36.0 (−32.8)	−29.0 (−20.2)	−17.0 (1.4)	−9.0 (15.8)	2.6 (36.7)	6.2 (43.2)	5.7 (42.3)	2.0 (35.6)	−6.0 (21.2)	−21.0 (−5.8)	−33.0 (−27.4)	−37.2 (−35.0)
Average precipitation mm (inches)	73.6 (2.90)	70.9 (2.79)	80.2 (3.16)	76.9 (3.03)	86.5 (3.41)	87.5 (3.44)	106.2 (4.18)	100.6 (3.96)	100.8 (3.97)	84.3 (3.32)	93.6 (3.69)	101.5 (4.00)	1,062.5 (41.83)
Average rainfall mm (inches)	28.4 (1.12)	22.7 (0.89)	42.2 (1.66)	65.2 (2.57)	86.5 (3.41)	87.5 (3.44)	106.2 (4.18)	100.6 (3.96)	100.8 (3.97)	82.1 (3.23)	68.9 (2.71)	44.4 (1.75)	834.9 (32.87)
Average snowfall cm (inches)	45.9 (18.1)	46.6 (18.3)	36.8 (14.5)	11.8 (4.6)	0.4 (0.2)	0.0 (0.0)	0.0 (0.0)	0.0 (0.0)	0.0 (0.0)	2.2 (0.9)	24.9 (9.8)	57.8 (22.8)	226.2 (89.1)
Average precipitation days (≥ 0.2 mm)	15.8	12.8	13.6	12.5	12.9	13.8	12.3	13.4	12.7	13.1	15.0	16.2	163.9
Average rainy days (≥ 0.2 mm)	4.3	4.0	7.4	10.9	12.8	13.8	12.3	13.4	12.7	12.7	11.5	6.5	122.2
Average snowy days (≥ 0.2 cm)	13.6	11.1	8.3	3.0	0.14	0.0	0.0	0.0	0.0	0.62	5.3	12.0	53.9
Mean monthly sunshine hours	99.2	119.5	158.8	181.7	229.8	250.1	271.6	230.7	174.1	138.6	80.4	80.7	2,015.2
Source: Environment and Climate Change Canada

== Demographics ==
Historical Census Data - Terrebonne, Quebec
Year	Pop.	±%
1861	1,935	—
1871	1,050	−45.7%
1881	1,398	+33.1%
1891	1,457	+4.2%
1901	1,822	+25.1%
1911	1,990	+9.2%
1921	2,056	+3.3%
1931	1,955	−4.9%
1941	2,209	+13.0%
1951	3,200	+44.9%
1956	4,097	+28.0%
1961	6,207	+51.5%
1966	7,480	+20.5%
1971	9,212	+23.2%
1976	11,204	+21.6%
1981	25,941	+131.5%
1986	31,310	+20.7%
1991	39,678	+26.7%
1996	42,214	+6.4%
2001	43,149	+2.2%
2006	94,703	+119.5%
2011	106,322	+12.3%
2016	111,575	+4.9%
2021	119,944	+7.5%

In the 2021 Census of Population conducted by Statistics Canada, Terrebonne had a population of 119,944 living in 45,247 of its 46,056 total private dwellings, a change of 7.5% from its 2016 population of 111,575. With a land area of 153.76 km^{2} (59.37 sq mi), it had a population density of 780.1/km^{2} (2,020.4/sq mi) in 2021.

Canada census – Terrebonne, Quebec community profile

	2021	2016	2011
Population	119,944 (+7.5% from 2016)	111,575 (+4.9% from 2011)	106,322 (+12.3% from 2006)
Land area	153.76 km^{2} (59.37 sq mi)	154.12 km^{2} (59.51 sq mi)	154.74 km^{2} (59.75 sq mi)
Population density	780.1/km^{2} (2,020/sq mi)	723.9/km^{2} (1,875/sq mi)	687.1/km^{2} (1,780/sq mi)
Median age	40.8 (M: 40.4, F: 41.6)	39 (M: 38.5, F: 39.4)	37.1 (M: 36.6, F: 37.5)
Private dwellings	46,056 (total)	42,622 (total)	40,282 (total)
Median household income	$95,000	$78,986	$68,841

References: 2021 2016 2011

=== Ethnicity ===
Panethnic groups in the City of Terrebonne (2001−2021)
Panethnic group	2021		2016		2011		2006		2001	
Panethnic group	Pop.	%	Pop.	%	Pop.	%	Pop.	%	Pop.	%
European (Note: Statistic includes all persons that did not make up part of a visible minority or an indigenous identity.)	95,815	81.17%	96,525	87.07%	96,875	91.73%	90,925	96.33%	41,980	98.19%
African	12,985	11%	7,965	7.19%	4,710	4.46%	1,260	1.33%	310	0.73%
Middle Eastern (Note: Statistic includes total responses of "West Asian" and "Arab" under visible minority section on census.)	3,305	2.8%	1,975	1.78%	1,195	1.13%	350	0.37%	85	0.2%
Latin American	2,545	2.16%	1,870	1.69%	1,340	1.27%	850	0.9%	125	0.29%
Indigenous	1,560	1.32%	1,230	1.11%	740	0.7%	560	0.59%	130	0.3%
Southeast Asian (Note: Statistic includes total responses of "Filipino" and "Southeast Asian" under visible minority section on census.)	765	0.65%	630	0.57%	260	0.25%	135	0.14%	30	0.07%
East Asian (Note: Statistic includes total responses of "Chinese", "Korean", and "Japanese" under visible minority section on census.)	470	0.4%	425	0.38%	230	0.22%	235	0.25%	95	0.22%
South Asian	260	0.22%	80	0.07%	105	0.1%	15	0.02%	0	0%
Other (Note: Statistic includes total responses of "Visible minority, n.i.e." and "Multiple visible minorities" under visible minority section on census.)	335	0.28%	150	0.14%	145	0.14%	50	0.05%	0	0%
Total responses	118,045	98.42%	110,855	99.35%	105,605	99.33%	94,385	99.66%	42,755	99.09%
Total population	119,944	100%	111,575	100%	106,322	100%	94,703	100%	43,149	100%

- Note: Totals greater than 100% due to multiple origin responses.

=== Language ===
Canada Census Mother Tongue - Terrebonne, Quebec
Census	Total	French			English			French & English			Other		
Year	Responses	Count	Trend	Pop %	Count	Trend	Pop %	Count	Trend	Pop %	Count	Trend	Pop %
2021	118,465	99,315	▲1.58%	83.38%	3,095	▲27.1%	2.61%	1,395	▲80.9%	1.17%	12,040	▲34.9%	10.16%
2016	111 130	97 765	▲8.0%	87.8%	2 435	▲17.4%	2.19%	730	▲59.3%	0.65%	8 925	▲51.9%	8.03%
2011	105,125	95,940	▲9.1%	91.26%	2,190	▲51.14%	2.08%	685	▲5.83%	0.65%	6,310	▲41.44%	6.00%
2006	94,385	87,935	▲115.8%	93.17%	1,865	▲122.0%	1.98%	430	▲132.4%	0.45%	4,155	▲324.0%	4.40%
2001	42,745	40,740	▲1.8%	95.31%	840	▲0.6%	1.97%	185	▼13.9%	0.43%	980	▲24.8%	2.29%
1996	41,835	40,000	n/a	95.61%	835	n/a	2.00%	215	n/a	0.51%	785	n/a	1.88%

== Attractions ==
=== Île-des-moulins ===
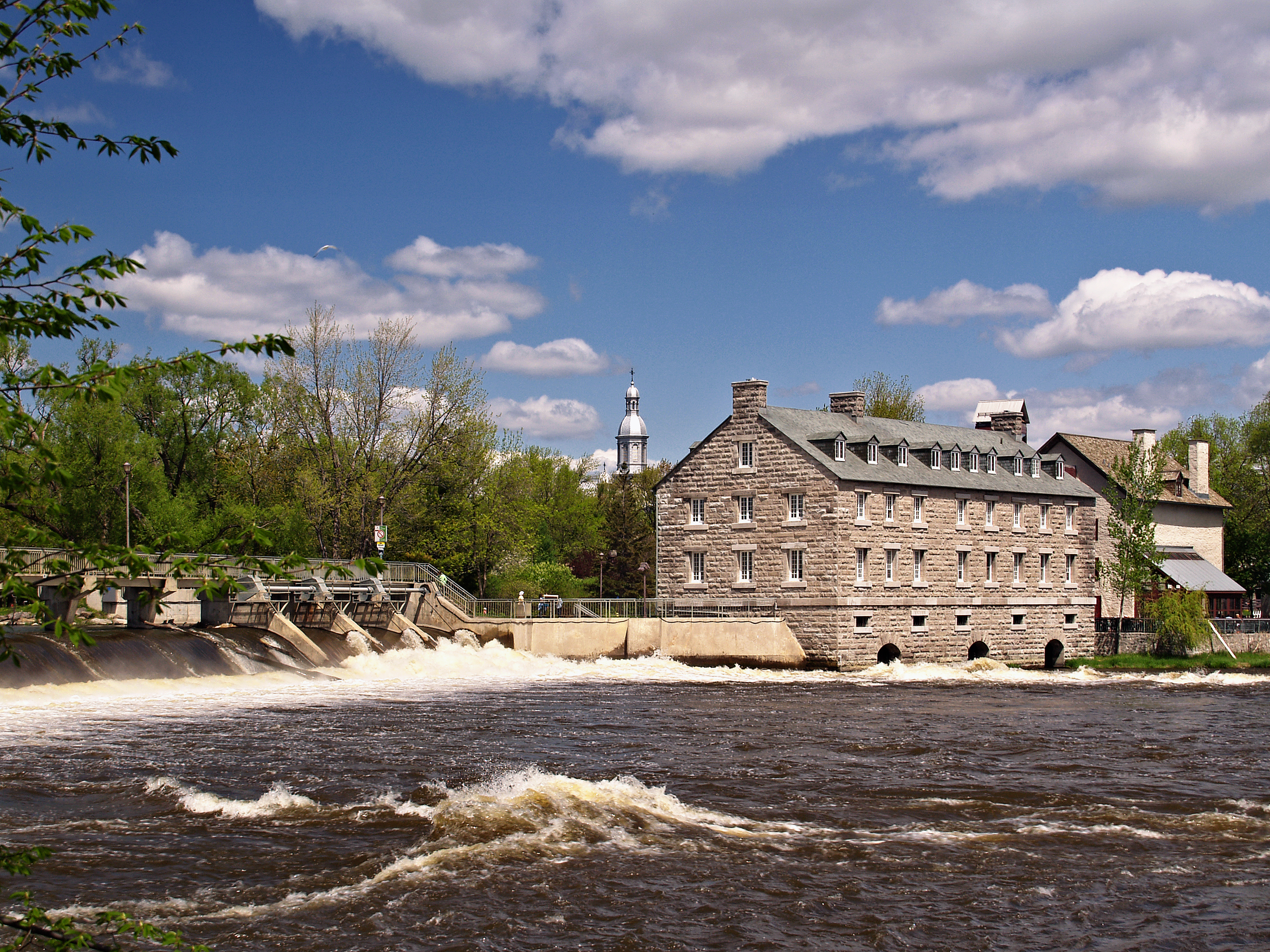
The Moulin neuf (New Mill) at the Île-des-moulins

The pre-industrial complex of the Île-des-moulins was amongst the most important ones in the province of Quebec during the 19th century. Although several infrastructures have degraded, a total of five buildings remain. The fourth lord of Terrebonne, Abbot Louis Lepage, had ordered the construction of the first flour mill in 1721 as well as the first saw mill around 1725.

In 1803, the bakery was built and established in the village. The current saw and flour mills were built in 1804 and 1846, respectively. Four years following the construction of the flour mill that is currently standing at the Île-des-moulins to this day, the Moulin neuf (New Mill) was built in 1850. In addition, around the same time in 1850, the seigniory office was established.

In 1973, the Île-des-moulins was classified as a historic site of national interest by the Government of Quebec.

=== Moulin-Neuf dam ===
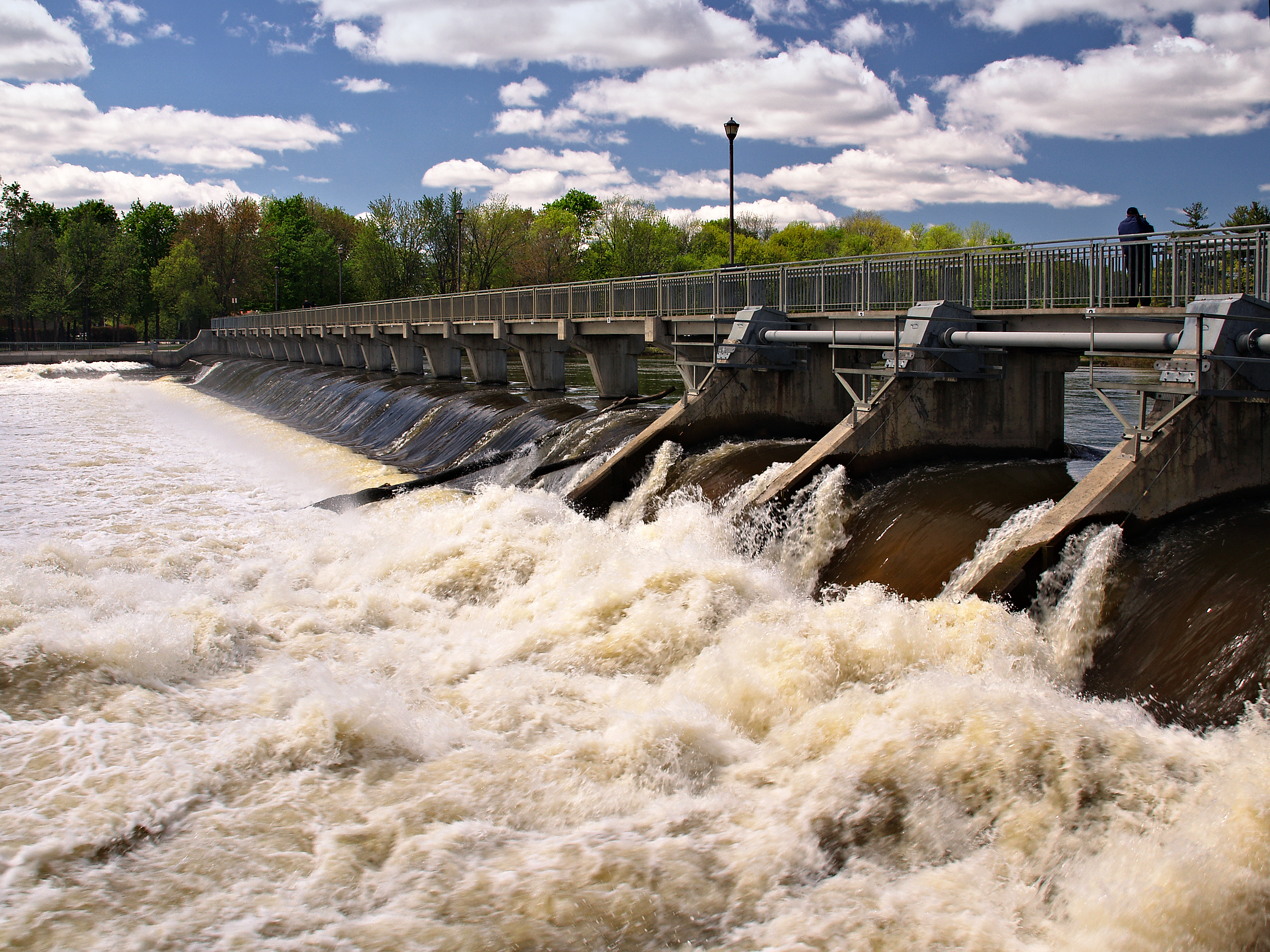
The actual Moulin-Neuf dam with the pedestrian walkway at the Île-des-moulins in Terrebonne

The Moulin-Neuf dam allows for the flow regulation of the Rivière des Mille Îles, as well as ice accumulation control in the spring.

The first dam at the Île-des-moulins was built in 1721, following the establishment of the very first flour mill. This dam linked the Île-des-moulins to the Île Saint-Jean, passing through the small Île aux moutons, located midway between the two islands in the Rivière des Mille Îles.

In 1872, the Masson family ordered the construction of a new dam near the location of the current historical one. However, this dam was rebuilt in cement in the year 1890 for reinforcement and increased resilience.

Nearly a century later, in 1972, the owner of the Île-des-moulins decided to destroy the dam with dynamite due to flooding risk. As a result, the dam underwent severe damage, prompting the city of Terrebonne to acquire the island and classify it as a protected historical site in 1973.

In 1979, the Ministère des Richesses naturelles du Québec ordered the reconstruction of the Moulin-Neuf dam, to which a pedestrian walkway was added to allow citizens, visitors, and tourists to walk from the Île-des-moulins to the larger Île Saint-Jean. This new dam was built a certain distance away from the small Île aux moutons, making the dam significantly longer than the initial ones.

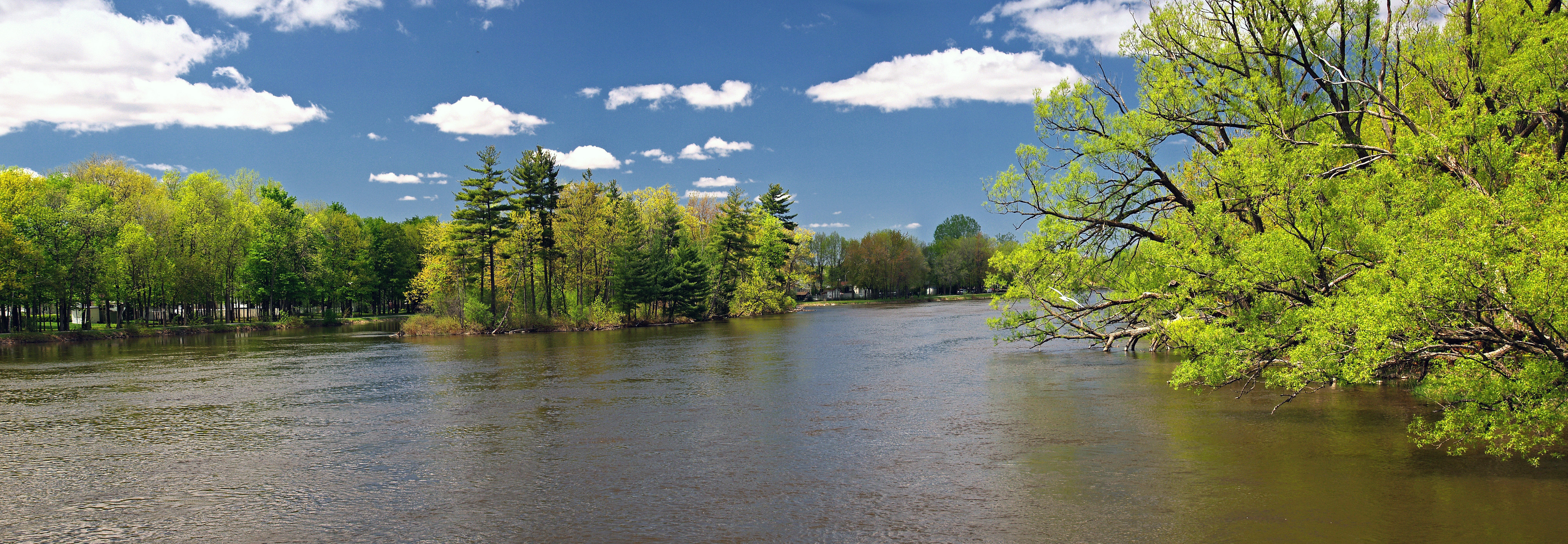
A picture of the Rivière des Mille Îles in Terrebonne, in which the Île Saint-Jean, the Île aux moutons and the Île-des-moulins can be seen from left to right, respectively.

=== Ecclesiastical architecture ===
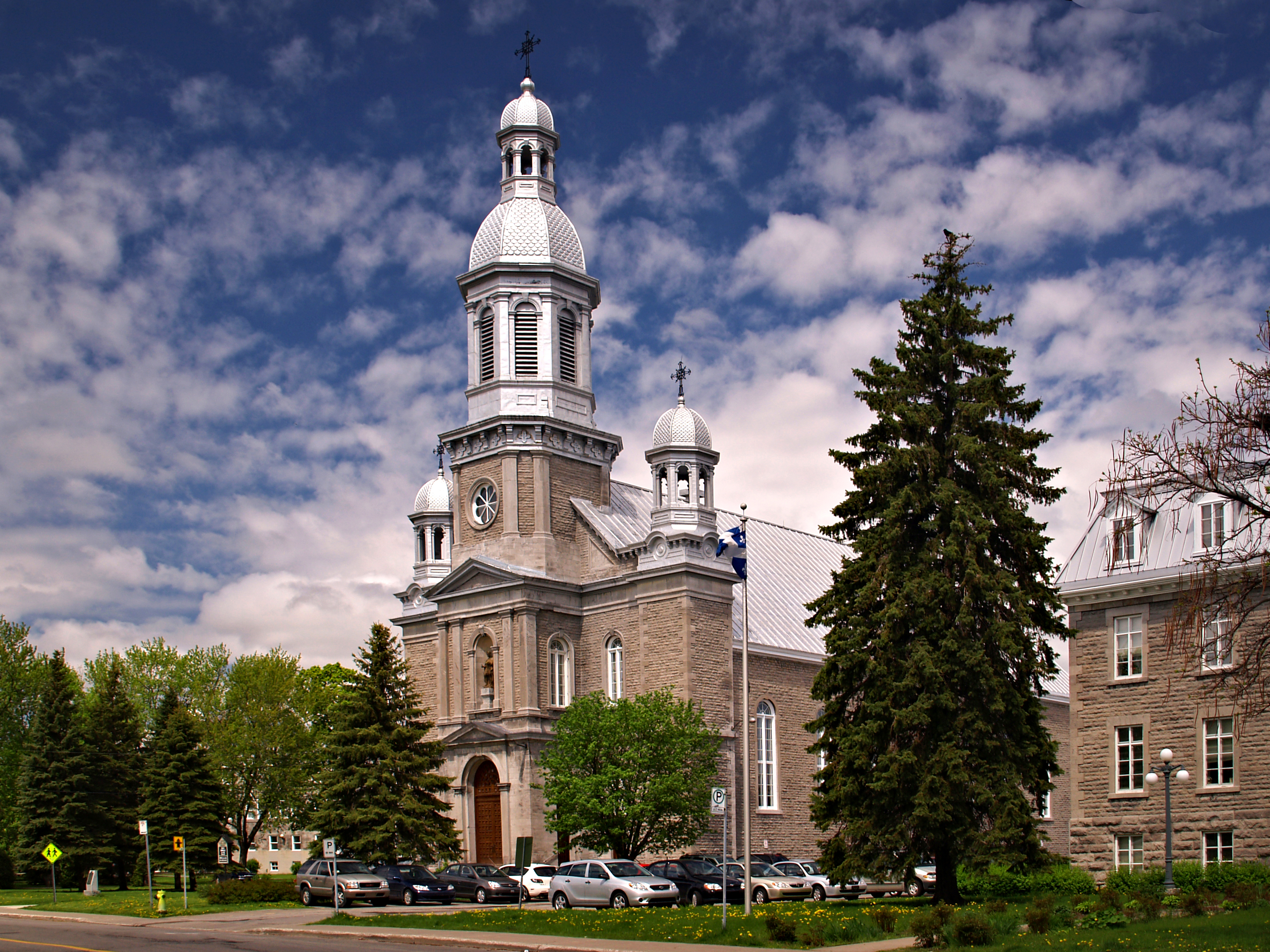
The Saint-Louis-de-France Church in Terrebonne

The actual Saint-Louis-de-France Church in Old Terrebonne (Vieux Terrebonne), near the historical site of the Île-des-moulins, was established in 1878, while the parish was founded in 1723 by Louis Lepage de Sainte-Claire, priest of the diocese of Quebec, parish priest of the Île Jésus, and lord of the Seigniory of Terrebonne. The parish was part of the diocese of Saint-Jérôme.

The current Saint-Louis-de-France Church built around the year 1878, the third since the foundation of the parish, was equipped with a Casavant organ in 1946.

In 1880, parish priest Piché, informally known as the bon monsieur Piché ("Good Mister Piché" in English), exhumed the bodies buried in the basement of the old church in order to place them in the crypt of the new one.

== Sports ==
The Terrebonne Cobras are part of the QJHL.

== Government ==
The Terrebonne City Council consists of the mayor and 16 councillors. Mathieu Traversy has been the mayor since 2021.

== Infrastructure ==
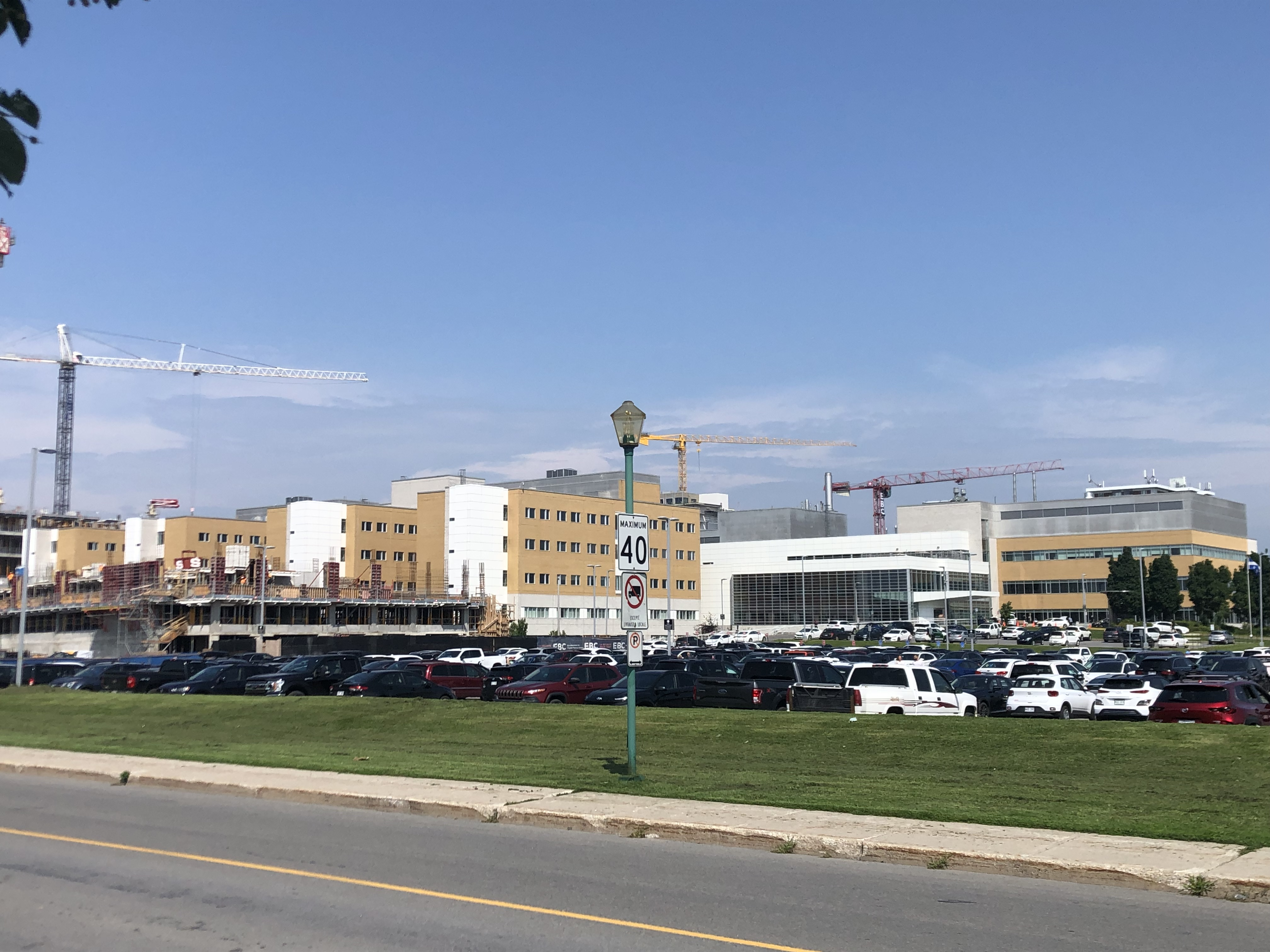
Pierre-Le Gardeur Hospital

Terrebonne is connected to Montreal's Central Station by commuter rail via the Terrebonne station of the Réseau de transport métropolitain (RTM) Mascouche line.

The city of Terrebonne is also equipped with a bus network, also operated by the RTM, which enables residents to reach several metro stations both in Laval and Montreal, amongst many other locations. Some examples include bus line 30 (or 30G), which brings inhabitants of Terrebonne to the Radisson metro station on Sherbrooke Street East, bus line 19 (or 19G), which reaches Montmorency metro station in Laval, and bus line 25, whose terminal stop is at the Henri-Bourassa metro station.

== Education ==
=== University ===
The Université de Montréal has a small campus located near the Pierre Le Gardeur Hospital in the Lachenaie sector of the city of Terrebonne. There are also some courses given by the Université du Québec à Montréal (UQÀM) in the Terrebonne sector, as well as the Centre universitaire de Lanaudière à Terrebonne affiliated with the Université du Québec à Trois-Rivières (UQTR) located within the Cégep régional de Lanaudière à Terrebonne.

=== Colleges ===
The Cégep régional de Lanaudière network has established a collegial institution, namely the Cégep régional de Lanaudière à Terrebonne, near Highway 640, in the Terrebonne sector of the city of Terrebonne.

=== Vocational studies ===
The city of Terrebonne counts several vocational education centres. The Centre de formation professionnelle des moulins is located next to the Cégep régional de Lanaudière à Terrebonne in the Terrebonne sector.

=== Primary and secondary schools ===
French-language public schools in Terrebonne Ouest are operated by the Commission scolaire de la Seigneurie-des-Mille-Îles (CSSMI). Additionally, some schools within and serving the city of Terrebonne are operated by the French Commission scolaire des Affluents and the English Sir Wilfrid Laurier School Board.

Commission scolaire des Affluents secondary schools include:

- École secondaire Armand-Corbeil
- École secondaire de l’Odyssée
- École secondaire Des Rives
- École secondaire des Trois-Saisons

CSSMI primary schools:

- de l'Espace-Couleurs
- Jeunes du monde
- Marie-Soleil-Tougas

Some CSSMI sections are zoned to École primaire Le Carrefour in Lorraine. The CSSMI secondary schools serving Terrebonne are: École secondaire du Harfang in Sainte-Anne-des-Plaines, École secondaire Hubert-Maisonneuve (lower secondary) in Rosèmere and École secondaire Rive-Nord (upper secondary) in Bois-des-Filion.

Private Francophone secondary schools include:

- Collège Saint-Sacrement

Anglophone public schools serving Terrebonne include:

- McCaig Elementary School in Rosemère serves western Terrebonne
- Pinewood Elementary School in Mascouche serves a central portion
- Franklin Hill Elementary School in Repentigny serves an eastern portion
- Rosemère High School (all areas) in Rosemère

== Sister cities ==
- Vitré (France) 1983

== See also ==
- Saint Pierre River (Mascouche), a river
- Mascouche River, a river
- Rivière des Mille Îles, a river
