= Lachenaie, Quebec =

Human settlement in Terrebonne, Quebec, Canada

Coordinates: 45°42′53.6″N 73°30′57.9″W

Coat of arms of Lachenaie

Lachenaie was an off-island suburb of Montreal, in southwestern Quebec, Canada on the Rivière des Mille-Îles. It is now part of the city of Terrebonne, and is in the Regional County Municipality of Les Moulins. In 2001, the population was 21,709.

== History ==
In 1647, the Company of New France granted Pierre Legardeur de Repentigny a seigneury that he named Repentigny. In 1670, the Legardeur family ceded part of its seigneury to Charles Aubert de La Chesnaye, one of the most important landowners in New France. The first settlers would not land in Lachenaie until two years later.

Lachenaie was the 34th parish to be created in New France when it was founded in 1683 by the seigneur of the same name. The following year, fortifications were built around the seigneurial domain just in time to protect against the Iroquois who were threatening the French colonies of the time.

Far from having been spared by the Franco-Iroquois War, Lachenaie was the most affected parish in New France. After this war, for which the peace treaty was signed in 1701, only half of the Lachenois population remained, numbering only 32 souls.

Construction of the famous Chemin du Roy began in 1731, along the Mille-Îles River (now the Saint-Charles Road). The status of Lachenaie has been modified several times: from the municipality of Lachenaie, it became the County Municipality of Lachenaie and finally became the municipality of Saint-Charles-de-Lachenaie in 1855.

Finally, it was in 1972 that the municipality of the Parish of Saint-Charles-de-Lachenaie became the City of Lachenaie. The city celebrated its 300th anniversary in 1983. On June 27, 2001 Lachenaie La Plaine and Terrebonne merged under the new name of Terrebonne-
