= List of airports in the Montreal area =

Location in Montreal. Airports marked "(H)" are historical.
Location in Quebec

The following active airports serve the area around Montreal, Quebec, Canada, lying underneath or immediately adjacent to Montreal's terminal control area:

Montréal-Pierre Elliot Trudeau International Airport terminal and control tower

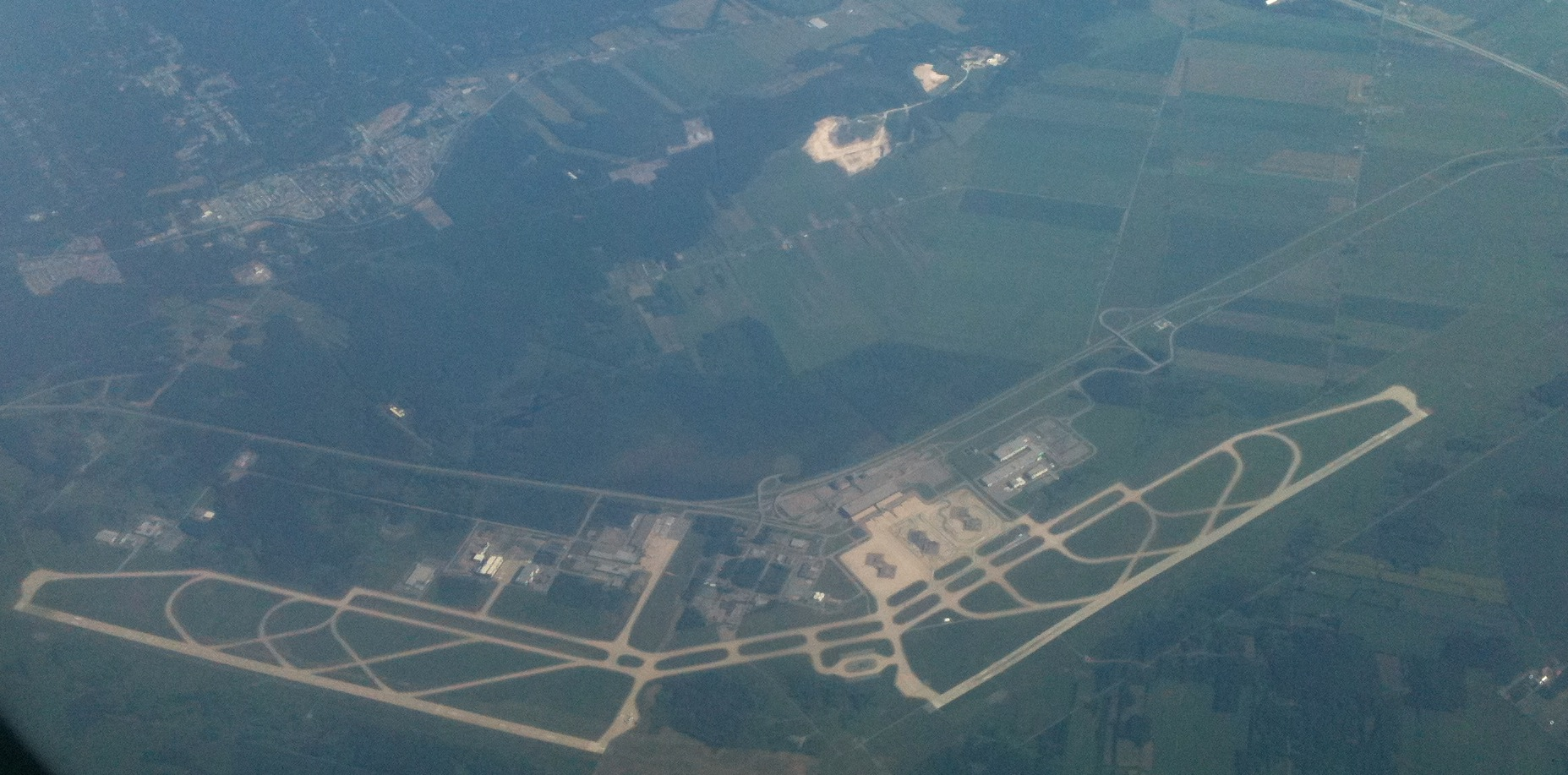
Montréal–Mirabel International Airport

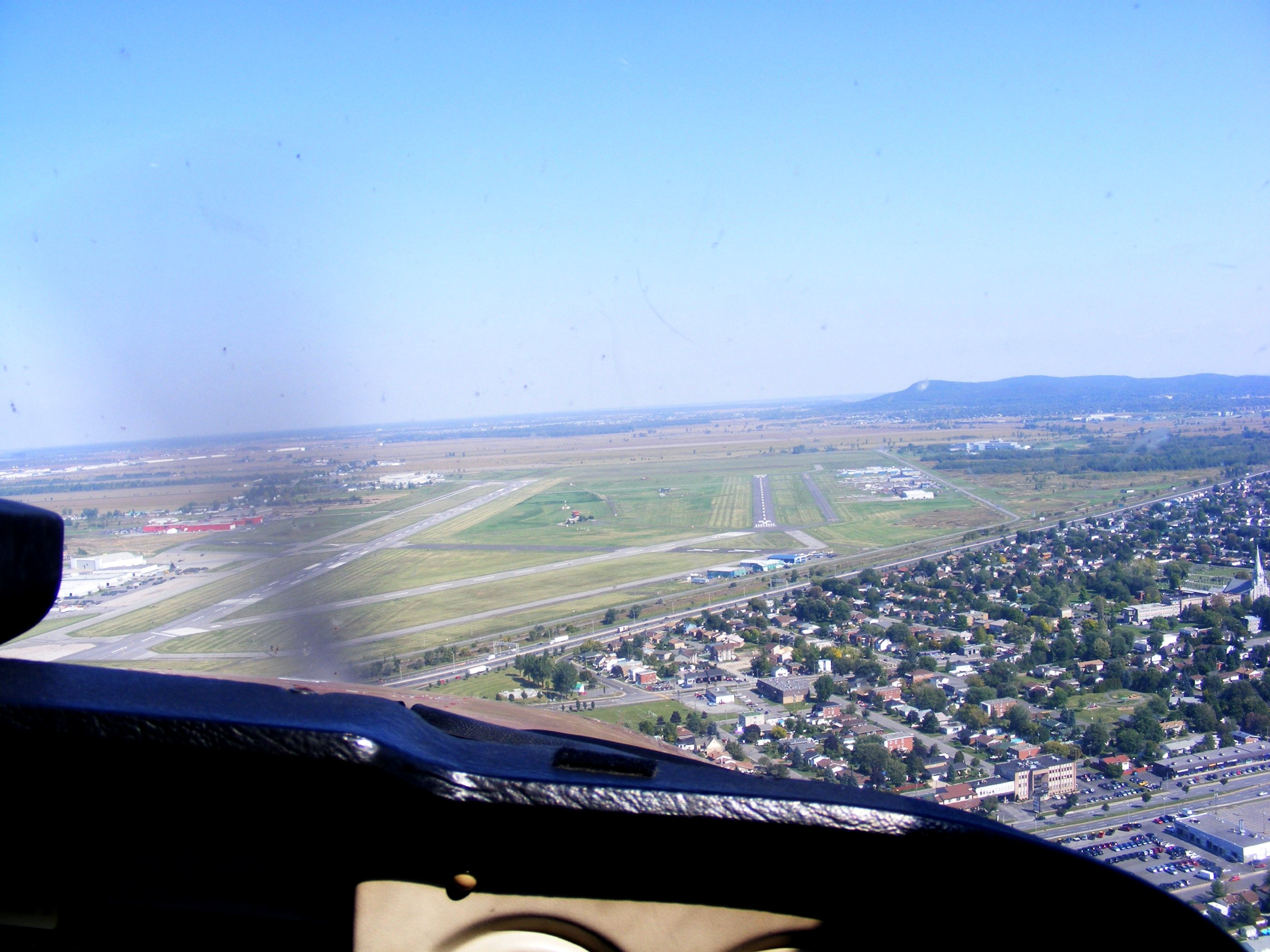
Montreal Saint-Hubert Longueuil Airport

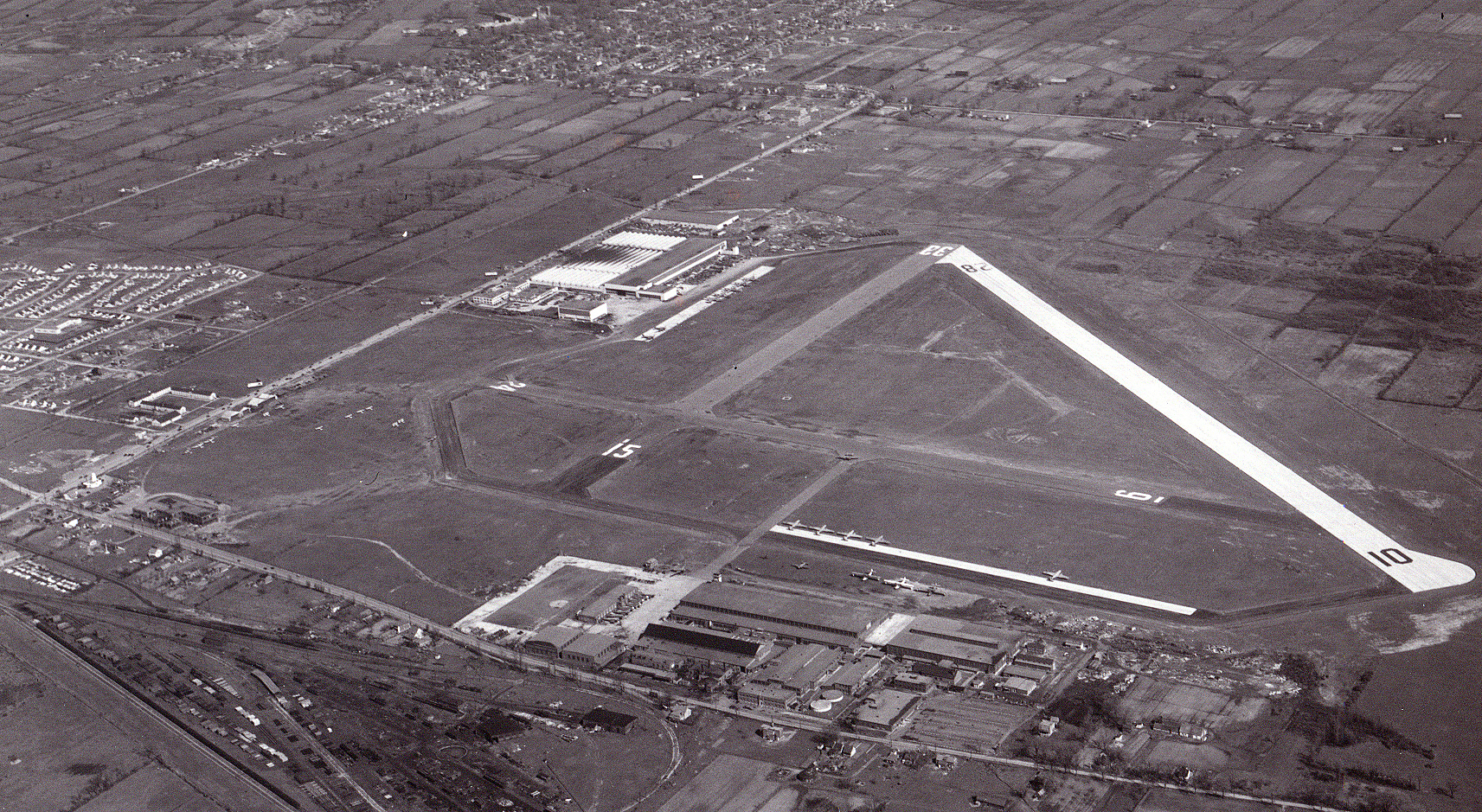
The former Cartierville Airport

The code for all Montreal airports is YMQ.

== Land based airports ==
=== Scheduled commercial airline service ===
Airport name	ICAO/TC LID/IATA	Location	Coordinates
Montréal–Trudeau International Airport	CYUL (YUL)	Dorval	45°28′14″N 073°44′27″W
Montreal Metropolitan Airport	CYHU (YHU)	Saint-Hubert, Longueuil	45°31′03″N 073°25′01″W

=== Other ===
Airport name	ICAO/TC LID/IATA	Location	Coordinates
Alexandria Aerodrome	CNS4	North Glengarry, Ontario	45°20′00″N 074°37′00″W
Hawkesbury Airport	CNV4	Hawkesbury, Ontario	45°37′00″N 074°39′00″W
Hawkesbury (East) Airport	CPG5	Hawkesbury, Ontario	45°34′58″N 074°32′56″W
Lac Agile (Mascouche) Airport	CSA2	Mascouche	45°47′31″N 073°38′17″W
Lachute Airport	CSE4	Lachute	45°38′22″N 074°22′14″W
Montréal/Aéroparc Île Perrot	CSP6	Montreal	45°22′34″N 073°54′26″W
Montréal/Les Cèdres Airport	CSS3	Les Cèdres	45°20′51″N 074°04′36″W
Montréal–Mirabel International Airport	CYMX (YMX)	Mirabel	45°40′55″N 074°00′19″W
Montréal/Saint-Lazare Aerodrome	CST3	Saint-Lazare	45°23′33″N 074°08′03″W
Saint-Jean Airport	CYJN (YJN)	Saint-Jean-sur-Richelieu	45°17′40″N 073°16′52″W
Saint-Mathias Aerodrome	CSP5	Saint-Mathias-sur-Richelieu	45°30′03″N 073°14′30″W
Saint-Mathias/Grant Aerodrome	CSX5	Saint-Mathias-sur-Richelieu	45°28′19″N 073°11′58″W
Saint-Mathieu-de-Beloeil Aerodrome	CSB3	Saint-Mathieu-de-Beloeil	45°35′24″N 073°14′19″W
Salaberry-de-Valleyfield Aerodrome	CSD3	Salaberry-de-Valleyfield	45°12′30″N 074°08′29″W
Richelieu Airport	CSX3	Richelieu	45°26′52″N 073°14′03″W
Richelieu/Messier Aerodrome	CRM3	Richelieu	45°22′41″N 073°13′37″W

Montréal-Trudeau (formerly known as Dorval) handles the scheduled passenger service for Montreal. Mirabel formerly also handled scheduled passenger service, but it has been discontinued and the airport is little used. Saint-Hubert is the major general aviation reliever for the city, though Trudeau also sees a lot of general aviation traffic.

Plattsburgh International Airport in Plattsburgh, New York, markets itself as "Montreal's U.S. airport". The airport is 97 km (60 mi) from Montreal, and closer than Trudeau to the South Shore. More than 80% of passengers departing Plattsburgh Airport are Canadian.

== Water aerodromes ==
Airport name	ICAO/TC LID/IATA	Location	Coordinates
Montréal/Boisvert & Fils Water Airport	CSA4	Rivière des Prairies, Montreal	45°38′44″N 073°35′49″W
Montréal/Hydro Aéroport de Montréal Water Airport	CHA3	Saint Lawrence River, Longueuil, Montreal	45°32′40″N 073°30′55″W
Saint-Mathias Water Aerodrome	CSV9	Richelieu River, Saint-Mathias-sur-Richelieu	45°30′10″N 073°15′08″W

== Heliports ==
Airport name	ICAO/TC LID/IATA	Location	Coordinates
Montréal (Bell) Heliport	CSW5	Montreal	45°41′06″N 073°55′52″W
Montréal East (AIM) Heliport	CSH9	Montreal	45°38′09″N 073°33′44″W
Montréal/Heliport Senneville	CHS5	Montreal	45°26′34″N 073°57′38″W
Montréal/Kruger Heliport	CSN2	Montreal	45°30′25″N 073°38′09″W
Montréal/Laval (Artopex Plus) Heliport	CLP2	Montreal	45°34′43″N 073°45′00″W
Montréal/Les Cèdres Heliport	CSH6	Les Cèdres	45°21′00″N 074°05′00″W
Montréal/Longueuil (Centre Hospitalier Pierre-Boucher) Heliport	CCH5	Hôpital Pierre Boucher, Montreal	45°32′17″N 073°27′36″W
Montréal/Mirabel Hélico Heliport	CMH4	Montreal	45°41′44″N 073°57′09″W
Montréal/Passport Hélico Heliport	CPP8	Montreal	45°43′21″N 073°35′43″W
Montréal/Point Zero Heliport	CPZ6	Montreal	45°31′47″N 073°39′27″W
Montréal/Saint-Hubert Heli-Inter Heliport	CTG2	Saint-Hubert, Longueuil	45°31′57″N 073°24′42″W
Montréal (Sacre-Coeur) Heliport	CSZ8	Hôpital du Sacré-Cœur de Montréal, Montreal	45°31′58″N 073°42′44″W
Valleyfield (Ciment Deval Inc) Heliport	CSY5	Salaberry-de-Valleyfield	45°15′49″N 074°08′57″W

== Historical airports ==
Airport name	ICAO/TC LID/IATA	Location	Coordinates
Cartierville Airport	CYCV (YCV)	Saint-Laurent	45°31′00″N 073°43′00″W
Chambly Airport	CTT2	Chambly	45°24′04″N 073°17′43″W
Hawkesbury (Windover Field) Airport	CPD8	Hawkesbury, Ontario	45°33′52″N 074°48′35″W
Montréal/Boucherville Water Aerodrome	CTA7	Boucherville	45°37′40″N 073°27′17″W
Montréal/Île Sainte-Hélène Water Airport	CVP2	Saint Helen's Island, Montreal	45°31′15″N 073°32′20″W
Montréal/Marina Venise Water Airport	CST8	Rivière des Mille Îles, Montreal	45°37′59″N 073°46′59″W
Montréal/Mascouche Airport	CSK3	Mascouche	45°43′07″N 073°35′53″W
CFB St. Hubert		Montreal	45°30′47″N 073°25′20″W
Victoria STOLport	CYMY (YMY)	Montreal	45°28′57″N 073°32′55″W
