= Mascouche River =

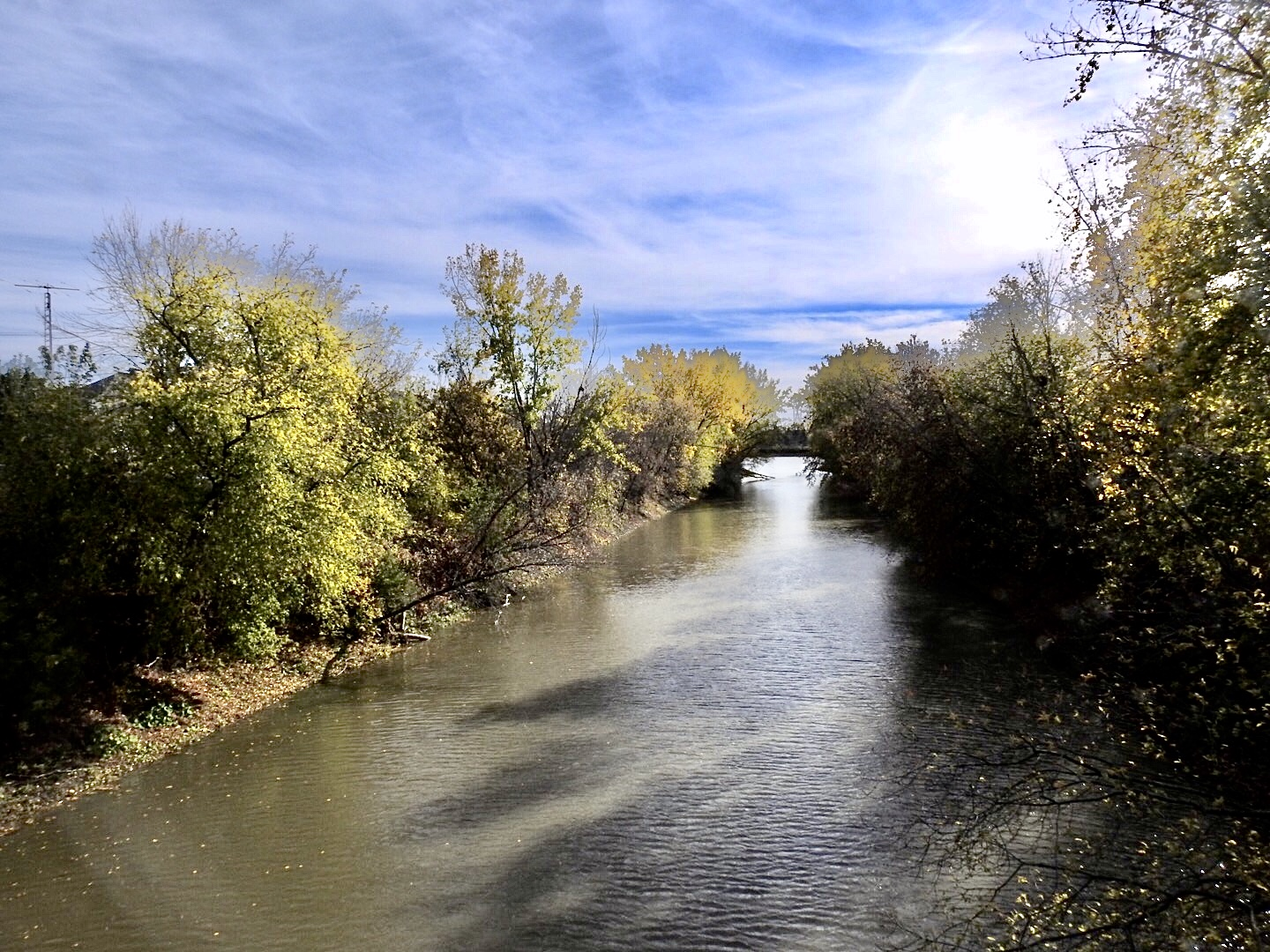

Physical characteristics
- Source
  - location: Mirabel Airport area, Mirabel
  - elevation: 72 m (236 ft)
- Mouth
  - location: Rivière des Mille Îles, Mascouche
  - elevation: 13 m (43 ft)
- Length: 63.5 km (39.5 mi)

Basin features
- Tributaries
  - left: Ruisseau de la cabane ronde, ruisseau des Grandes Prairies, ruisseau Saint-Philippe, ruisseau Gariepy-Gagnon, débouche des Sables, Saint Pierre River (Mascouche), ruisseau Noir, ruisseau La Corne, ruisseau de Mascouche, ruisseau Rivard-Lauzon, ruisseau Hogue-Therrien, Saint Pierre River (Mirabel), ruisseau Desjardins, ruisseau Lapointe.
  - right: Ruisseau Forget-Messier, ruisseau Noir.

The Mascouche River is a river flowing in the municipality of Terrebonne, in Les Moulins Regional County Municipality (RCM), in the administrative region of Lanaudière, in Quebec, in Canada.

== Geography ==
Course of the river

Mascouche River rises in the area east slopes of Mirabel airport, draining various streams: Ouellet, Gascon-Forget, Cardinal Lapointe, Desjardins Hogue-Therrien and Saint Pierre River (Mirabel). From the airport area, the river:

- 5.2 kilometres (3.2 mi) to the east, to Highway 15 (Autoroute des Laurentides);
- 9.3 kilometres (5.8 mi) (or 6.1 kilometres (3.8 mi) in direct line) through the village of Saint-Janvier, up to the Saint Pierre River (Mirabel) (from the northwest). In this segment, the river serpentine downstream of the village;
- 1.7 kilometres (1.1 mi) (or 1.1 kilometres (0.68 mi) in direct line) serpentines up to the limit of the Mirabel and Sainte-Thérèse-de-Blainville;
- 3.3 kilometres (2.1 mi) (or 2.75 kilometres (1.71 mi) in direct line) with some coils to the route 335;
- 6.3 kilometres (3.9 mi) (or 6.0 kilometres (3.7 mi) in a straight line) to the east, with some coils to the limit of Les Moulins Regional County Municipality (RCM);
- 6.4 kilometres (4.0 mi) (or 4.25 kilometres (2.64 mi) in direct line) to the east, crossing the Pincourt area until the route 337. In this area, the river began to move towards the northeast;
- 4.6 kilometres (2.9 mi) (or 2.8 kilometres (1.7 mi) in a straight line) to the north-east to the Saint Pierre River is the largest tributary.

Downstream course of the St. Pierre River

Mascouche River continues its course:

- 2.1 kilometres (1.3 mi) to the highway bridge of Moorcrest sector Mascouche. From this area, the river is more towards the north;
- 6.6 kilometres (4.1 mi) (or 3.6 kilometres (2.2 mi) in direct line) forming several coils, to the northernmost part of the river (south of Domaine-Guilbeault);
- 5.8 kilometres (3.6 mi) (or 3.6 kilometres (2.2 mi) in a straight line) to the south to the highway bridge in the city of Mascouche;
- 1.8 kilometres (1.1 mi) to the east, to Highway 25;
- 1.1 kilometres (0.68 mi) to the east, to the bridge of the railroad,
- 5.0 kilometres (3.1 mi) (or 3.4 kilometres (2.1 mi) in direct line) south to Highway 640,
- 2.9 kilometres (1.8 mi) to the south-west to a channel arranged to achieve faster Mille Îles River;
- 1.4 kilometres (0.87 mi) to the west to the mouth of the river located in the Old Terrebonne.

== Toponymy ==
The minutes of Mathieu-Benoît Collet (1721), in the section on Jesus Island, including mention Maskoueche river. Variations: St. Marys River and Rivière Saint-Jean-Baptiste.

The place name "Mascouche River" was formalized December 5, 1968, at the Bank of place names of Commission de toponymie du Québec (Quebec Geographical Names Board).

== See also ==
- Sainte-Anne-des-Plaines, Quebec, a municipality
- Terrebonne, a city
- Mirabel, Quebec, a city
- Les Moulins Regional County Municipality (RCM)
- Rivière des Mille Îles, a stream
- Saint Pierre River (Mascouche), a river
- Saint Pierre River (Mirabel), a river
