= Rivière-à-Pierre (disambiguation) =

Rivière-à-Pierre is a municipality of the Portneuf Regional County Municipality, in Capitale-Nationale, Quebec, Canada.

Rivière-à-Pierre may also refer to:

- Mont-Saint-Pierre, Quebec, a village municipality in La Haute-Gaspésie, Quebec, Canada, formerly known as Rivière-à-Pierre
- Rivière à Pierre (Ha! Ha! River tributary), a stream in Capitale-Nationale and Saguenay-Lac-Saint-Jean in Quebec, Canada
- Rivière à Pierre (Batiscan River tributary), a stream in the Portneuf Regional County Municipality, Capitale-Nationale, Quebec, Canada

== See also ==
- Pierre River (disambiguation)
