= Service régional d'admission du Montréal métropolitain =

The Service régional d'admission du Montréal métropolitain (SRAM) is a network of Quebec CEGEPs, and handles their admissions process with a standardized application form.

== Schools ==
- Cégep de l'Abitibi-Témiscamingue
- Collège Ahuntsic
- Cégep André-Laurendeau
- Collège de Bois-de-Boulogne
- Champlain College Lennoxville
- Cégep de Drummondville
- Cégep Édouard-Montpetit
- École nationale d'aérotechnique
- Cégep Gérald-Godin
- Cégep de Granby
- Heritage College
- John Abbott College
- Cégep régional de Lanaudière à L'Assomption
- Cégep régional de Lanaudière à Joliette
- Cégep régional de Lanaudière à Terrebonne
- Collège Lionel-Groulx
- Collège de Maisonneuve
- Cégep Marie-Victorin
- Collège Montmorency
- Cégep de l'Outaouais
- Collège de Rosemont
- Cégep de Saint-Hyacinthe
- Cégep Saint-Jean-sur-Richelieu
- Cégep de Saint-Jérôme
- Cégep de Saint-Laurent
- Collège Shawinigan
- Cégep de Sherbrooke
- Cégep de Sorel-Tracy
- Cégep de Trois-Rivières
- Collège de Valleyfield
- Vanier College
- Cégep du Vieux Montréal
- Institut de technologie agroalimentaire, Campus de Saint-Hyacinthe
- Institut de tourisme et d'hôtellerie du Québec
- Macdonald College
