= Cégep régional de Lanaudière =

Public college in Lanaudière, Quebec

Coordinates: 45°45′35″N 73°25′33″W

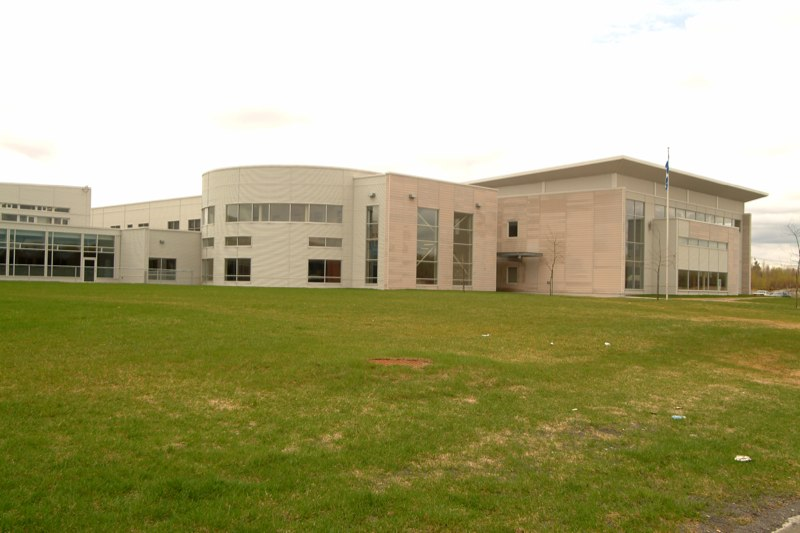
- Cégep régional de Lanaudière à Terrebonne
- Motto: Ensemble osons maintenant! (French)
- Motto in English: Together we will go now!
- Type: public Cégep
- Established: 1967
- Affiliations: ACCC, CCAA,
- Religious affiliation: non-denominational
- Undergraduates: pre-university students; technical
- Location: Lanaudière, Quebec, Canada
- Campus: Joliette, L'Assomption, and Terrebonne.
- Colours: Blue & Green
- Website: www.cegep-lanaudiere.qc.ca/

The Cégep régional de Lanaudière is a Cégep, made up of three constituent colleges in Joliette, L'Assomption and Terrebonne, located in Quebec, Canada.

As of early 2014, there are over 2,500 students at the Joliette constituent college and over 1,700 at the L'Assomption and Terrebonne constituent colleges respectively. Admissions at the L'Assomption college are handled by the Service régional d'admission du Montréal métropolitain (or SRAM; eng: City of Montreal regional admission services).

The Cégep régional de Lanaudière is a member of the Société de formation et d'éducation continue (or SOFEDUC; eng: Society for training and continuing education).

The current director general of the Cégep régional de Lanaudière is Marcel Côté, who has held this position since 2011.

== History ==
The Cégep régional de Lanaudière was founded in 1998 to provide accessible college-level education as well as continuing education opportunities to the Lanaudière region's youth and adult population as well as its business communities.

The Cégep is unique in that the constituent colleges in Joliette, L'Assomption, and Terrebonne each have their own offices and they also share resources and services offered by the administration centre at Repentigny.

Each college has its own mission. Academic and student life reflect the values, the culture, and the traditions of those who built it and who continue its development.

== Programs ==
The CEGEP offers two types of programs: pre-university and technical. The pre-university programs, which take two years to complete, cover the subject matters which roughly correspond to the additional year of high school given elsewhere in Canada in preparation for a chosen field in university. The technical programs, which take three years to complete, applies to students who wish to pursue a skill trade. Continuing education and services to business are provided.

== Governance model ==
The mission of the regional Cégep is to organize the college-level general and vocational instruction offered through its constituent colleges, in a way that allows them to cooperate with one another. As stated by the General and Vocational Colleges Act, these constituent colleges are responsible for implementing programs of college study assigned to them by the regional college, while contributing to the social and cultural development of the region they serve.

Since their establishment, the three constituent colleges have developed their own educational vision and assessment and evaluation policies. Each constituent college also has its own board of governors, academic departments, and programme committees that focus on the needs of their students and respective communities. In other words, even though they're part of a regional college, the constituent colleges have their own educational autonomy.

On a local scale, each constituent college has its own programs of study as well as cultural and sporting activities for students. The facilities of each constituent college address the needs of the regional community.

== Constituent colleges ==
=== Cégep régional de Lanaudière à Joliette ===
The Cégep régional de Lanaudière à Joliette is a public institution of higher education offering 23 programs, including Arts and Humanities, Information Technology, Administration, Agriculture, and Environmental Studies. The Cégep's education is recognized by the Commission d'évaluation de l'enseignement collégial (or CEEC; eng: the Evaluation Commission of College-level Education). The Cégep also offers a wide range of student services. Located in downtown Joliette, the Cégep is close to the Assomption River and various parks. The current director of the Joliette constituent college is Chantale Perreault, who has held this position since 2012.

==== Sports and recreation ====
===== Intercollegiate program =====
The intercollegiate program is for students who are interested in being part of a competitive sports team.

Intercollegiate activities for the 2013–2014 academic year are:

- Women's Flag Football
- Men's Ball Hockey
- Women's Indoor soccer
- Men's Indoor Soccer
- Co-ed Taekwondo
- Co-ed Volleyball
- Cheerleading
- Football
- Swimming
- Kin-Ball

===== Intramural program =====
The intramural program offers many recreational activities during lunch breaks. Participation is optional and the majority of activities (badminton, soccer, etc.) are free for students.

=== Cégep régional de Lanaudière à L'Assomption ===
Located in the downtown core, this constituent college offers 11 programs, including Arts and Humanities, Administration, Design and Education. These technical and pre-university programs lead to dîplômes d'études collégiales (or DEC; eng: Diploma of College Studies (DCS)) while the continuing education programs lead to attestations d'études collégiales (or AEC; eng: Attestation of College Studies (ACS)) in continuing education. The current director of the L'Assomption constituent college is Gabrielle Théroux, who has held this position since 2007.

==== Cégep expansion ====
At a press conference held on January 24, 2014, the Minister of Higher Education, Research, Science and Technology) confirmed the expansion of the Cégep régional de Lanaudière à l'Assomption and the implementation of a new Opticianry program. The objective of this expansion is to provide staff and students with adequate study and work space. Moreover, the college plans to build a clinic-school for students in the Opticianry program. This school will provide students enrolled in the program with a place to do their practicums, while providing low-cost optical care and eyeglasses prescriptions to L'Assomption residents. The project will cost approximately $13.5 million.

=== Cégep régional de Lanaudière à Terrebonne ===
The Cégep régional de Lanaudière à Terrebonne is situated on Montreal's north shore. The constituent college offers 9 programs, including Social Sciences, Arts, Technology, Administrative Studies, and Dental Hygiene. The college also maintains close ties with the community and businesses within the region.

The Cégep régional de Lanaudière à Terrebonne offers:

Michel Rouleau has been director of this constituent college since 2013.

== See also ==
- List of colleges in Quebec
- Higher education in Quebec
- Lanaudière
