= La Plaine, Quebec =

La Plaine
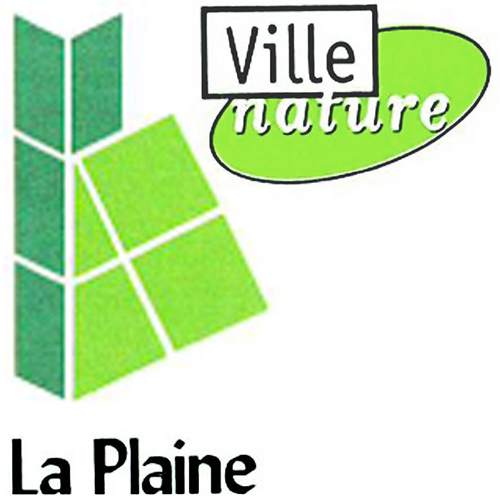
- Official La Plaine logo 1983-2001

- Coat of arms

- Location within Central Quebec Location within Greater Montreal
- Coordinates: 45°47′N 73°46′W
- Country: Canada
- Province: Quebec
- Seigneurie Des Plaines: 1731
- Saint-Joachim de La Plaine: 1922
- La Plaine: 1995

Population (2001)
  - Total: 15,673
- Time zone: UTC−05:00 (EST)
  - Summer (DST): UTC−04:00 (EDT)
- Postal code(s): J7M
- Area code: 450

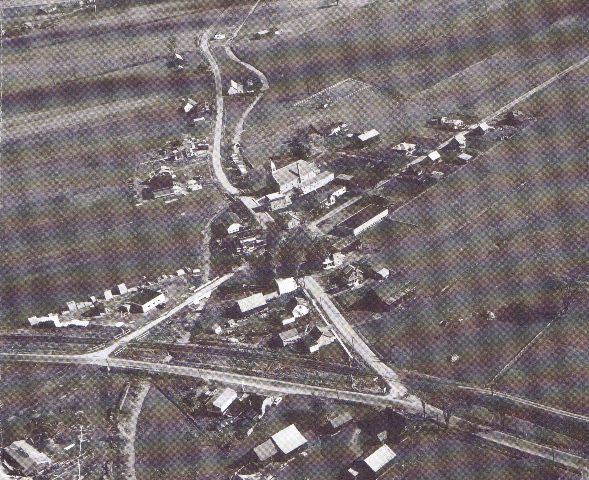
Aerial view of La Plaine (1955)

La Plaine (French pronunciation: [la plɛn]) is an off-island suburb of Montreal, and a former city in southwestern Quebec, Canada. It lies north of Montreal and Laval. Since June 27th, 2001 It is now part of the city of Terrebonne in the Les Moulins Regional County Municipality. It is part of the administrative division of Lanaudière.

== History ==
Although the seigneury of Des Plaines already existed in 1731, it had nothing to do with the town of La Plaine that we know today. It would take until 1840 for it to slowly appear, notably with the creation of the rang de La Plaine sud (now chemin Forest), located on the current territory of the La Plaine sector. When Calixte Gauthier decided to set up his general store at the crossroads of the Grande Ligne and Rang de La Plaine in 1863, he was certainly far from suspecting that he was setting the stage for the inauguration of the future village of La Plaine. In 1903, the constant growth of a hamlet far from Sainte-Anne-des-Plaines and Terrebonne led the Canadian Pacific to build a station at La Plaine. As the number of residents of the small hamlet of La Plaine grew, they proposed in 1912 to establish a new parish that could be made up of the rows far from the churches of Saint-Lin, Mascouche and Sainte-Anne-des-Plaines. However, far from being to everyone's liking, the idea would be debated for three long years. It was the Bishop of Joliette who proclaimed the founding of the Saint-Joachim mission, made up of the distant rows of Saint-Lin and Saint-Henri-de-Mascouche. As for the territory belonging to Sainte-Anne-des-Plaines, it was the diocese of Montreal that administered it and there was no question of it ceding part of its territory. However, five years later, the Bishop of Montreal finally authorized the annexation of the distant part of Sainte-Anne-des-Plaines to the Saint-Joachim mission. He then founded the religious parish of Saint-Joachim-de-La Plaine. The municipality of the Parish of Saint-Joachim was founded in 1922. Then, the municipality changed its name in 1969 to become the municipality of La Plaine. La Plaine became part of the Greater Montreal Area in 1986 and in June 28th, 1995 La Plaine received city status, and on June 27, 2001 La Plaine, Lachenaie and Terrebonne merged to make the new city of Terrebonne.

== Population ==
At the time of the merger in 2001, the population of La Plaine was 15,673.

== Climate ==
La Plaine has a warm summer humid continental climate (Köppen climate classification Dfb) with warm humid summers and cold winters The lowest temperature ever recorded was -44°C (-47°F) on January 15th, 1957 and the highest temperature recorded was 37°C (99°F) on August 1st, 1975

== Recreation ==
The Forum de La Plaine is a 2,000-seat multi-purpose arena.

== Education ==
The Commission scolaire des Affluents operates the following French public schools in this area:

- École primaire de l'Orée-des-Bois
- École primaire du Boisé
- École primaire Saint-Joachim
- École primaire du geai-bleu
- École secondaire de l'Odyssée

Sir Wilfrid Laurier School Board operates Anglophone public schools:

- Pinewood Elementary School in Mascouche
- Rosemère High School in Rosemère
