= Montréal/Mascouche Airport =

Defunct airport in Mascouche, Quebec, Canada

- IATA: none; ICAO: none; TC LID: CSK3

Summary
- Airport type: Public
- Operator: Corporation de l'aéroport de Mascouche
- Location: Mascouche, Quebec
- Time zone: EST (UTC−05:00)
  - Summer (DST): EDT (UTC−04:00)
- Elevation AMSL: 74 ft / 23 m
- Coordinates: 45°43′07″N 073°35′53″W

Map
- Location in Quebec CSK3 (Canada)

Runways
Direction	Length		Surface
Direction	ft	m	Surface
11/29	2,957	901	Asphalt
- Source: Canada Flight Supplement

Montréal/Mascouche Airport, formerly TC LID: CSK3, was a small, general aviation airport located 1.5 nautical miles (2.8 km; 1.7 mi) southeast of Mascouche and approximately 20 km (12 mi) northeast of Montreal, Quebec, Canada. It was reached by Autoroute 640 at exit 44. The runway was parallel to Autoroute 640. Montréal/Mascouche Airport closed 15 November 2016 and all aircraft had to be removed by 13 November.

A radio equipped aircraft was required to fly in and out of Mascouche Airport. The mandatory frequency for the airport was 122.35 MHz.

Mascouche Airport was the largest "regional airport" in the province of Quebec, in terms of air traffic. It was located close to the Le Gardeur regional hospital and could be used for medical evacuations. The airport regrouped 30 buildings, 15 related SMEs (including Cargair Inc., ALM Par Avion, and others) and sustained 75 full-time jobs. More than a hundred small planes were stationed there year-round.

There had been talks of closing down (or to privatize) the airport during the last decade, for various reasons: the land lots are well-located and are zoned industrial, the city was unwilling to invest in the airport, and the airport could not get government funding to build a control tower and to expand the runway's length. Moreover, the poor condition of the airport (i.e. its runway and its buildings) would have needed considerable investments To counter the closure of the airport, users had founded a group (Mascouche Airport Owners and Pilots Association). With more than 125 members, this group fought to keep the airport open, organizing many activities to stimulate interest in the airport.

Mascouche Airport was home to several flying schools and an important learning centre for new pilots. The airport offered an alternative to Montréal–Pierre Elliott Trudeau International Airport (which charges landing fees). Moreover, Mascouche Airport offered an alternative to Saint-Hubert Longueuil Airport flying schools, the former located on Montreal's south shore.

ALM Par Avion was one of the flying schools based in Mascouche. It operated a fleet of Cessna 152, Cessna 172, Piper Warrior PA-28 and one Piper Seneca PA-34.

== See also ==
- List of airports in the Montreal area
