= Heritage College (Gatineau) =

Public college in Gatineau, Quebec

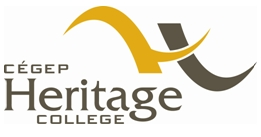
- Motto: "Small College, Big Dreams"
- Type: College
- Established: 1988
- Academic affiliations: CCAA, ACCC, AUCC, CBIE
- Dean: Terry Kharyati
- Location: 325, boulevard de la Cité-des-Jeunes; Gatineau, Quebec; J8Y 6T3; 45°27′19.7418″N 75°45′55.1484″W
- Campus: Urban
- Colours: Gold & brown
- Nickname: Hurricanes
- Website: www.cegep-heritage.qc.ca

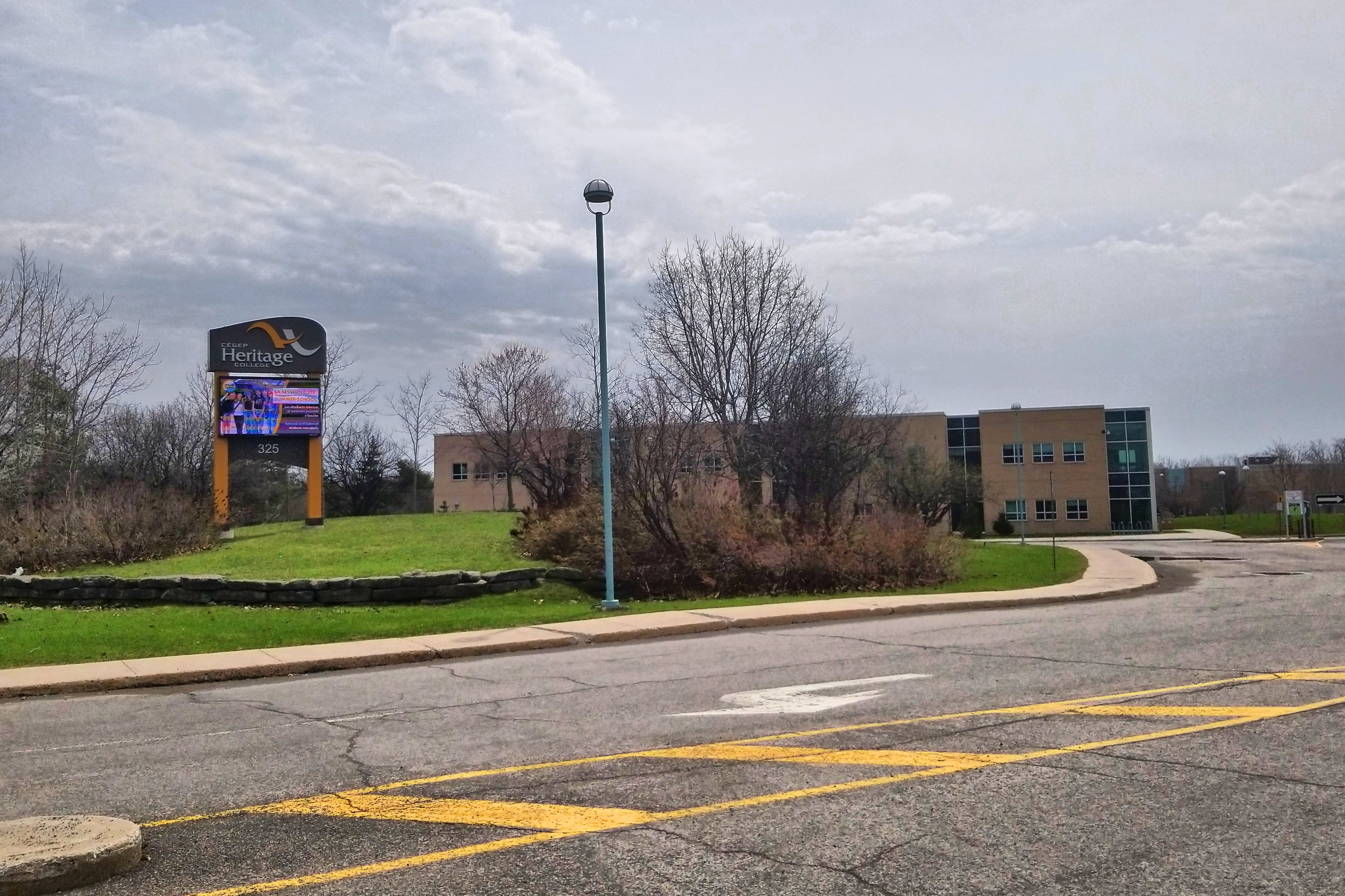
Heritage College in Hull, Quebec

Heritage College is a public English-language college located on Cité des Jeunes Boulevard in Gatineau, Quebec, Canada. It is the only English-language college in western Quebec.

== History ==
What began as an offshoot of the much larger Collège de l'Outaouais, with an initial enrollment of 7 students, evolved into an official campus and eventually a college. With an ever-increasing population and a few stays in renovated buildings (including a bowling alley and a couple of French high schools), it finally achieved fully autonomous status in 1988 as Heritage College. In 1994, it opened the doors on its newly constructed, more permanent facility; just down the street from its larger sister francophone college. In 1977, when students were housed in the newly renovated École Ste-Marie, a heritage building on Maisonneuve Boulevard, this branch of the French college was officially recognized as Heritage Campus. On October 16, 1994, the new Heritage College, with a student population of 900, opened.

== Programs ==
The college offers two types of programs: pre-university and technical. The pre-university programs, which take two years to complete, cover the subject matters which roughly corresponds to an additional year of high school and what is considered the first year of university elsewhere in Canada, in preparation for a chosen field in university. Students who complete pre-university programs typically complete undergraduate degrees in three years. The technical programs, which take three-years to complete, applies to students who wish to pursue a skill trade. In addition Continuing education and services to business are provided. Heritage offers the following programs leading to a DEC:

Career programs:

- Accounting and Management Technology
- Computer Science
- Early Childhood Care and Education
- Electronics Technology
- New Media and Publication Design
- Nursing
- Hospitality and Hotel Management
- Tourism

Pre-university programs:

- Commerce^{1}
- Liberal Arts
- Science
- Social Science
- Visual Arts

^{1}Although Commerce is listed as a separate program, it is technically a profile of Social Science and thus, Graduates of Commerce receive a DEC in Social Science, not Commerce.

Heritage also offers several continuing education courses, some of which lead to an AEC. Continuing Education offers various intensive day programs for adults such as Microsoft Network specialist and Bilingual Office System Administration.

Night courses also are offered.

== Student life ==
The campus offers health and fitness facilities such as a fully furnished gym, a multi-purpose room suitable for dancing, yoga, etc. and a gymnasium used for various sports.

The Heritage College Drama Club is the Bacchus Players.

S.Q.U.A.D. - Students Questing for Unity, Awareness and Diversity. Through activism, S.Q.U.A.D. is a club that wants to raise awareness for social, animal, environmental, human and political rights.

== Admission ==
Applications are handled through Le Service régional d'admission du Montréal métropolitain, although Heritage has no campus or facilities in Montreal itself.

== See also ==
- Higher education in Quebec
- List of colleges in Quebec
- List of universities in Quebec
- Canadian Interuniversity Sport
- Canadian government scientific research organizations
- Canadian university scientific research organizations
- Canadian industrial research and development organizations

Other English-language colleges in Quebec:

- Champlain
- Dawson College
- John Abbott College
- Marianopolis College
- Vanier College
