= Saint Pierre River (Mirabel) =

Location
- Country: Canada
- Province: Quebec
- Administrative region: Laurentides
- Regional County Municipality: Mirabel, sector "Saint-Janvier"
- Cities: Mirabel

Physical characteristics
- Source
  - location: Mirabel, sector "Saint-Janvier"
  - coordinates: 45°43′00″N 73°57′25″W
  - elevation: 72 m (236 ft)
- Mouth
  - location: Mascouche River, Mascouche
  - coordinates: 46°43′49″N 73°52′11″W
  - elevation: 51 m (167 ft)
- Length: 9.4 km (5.8 mi)

The Saint-Pierre River is a tributary of the Mascouche River, flowing in the sector of "Saint-Janvier", in the city of Mirabel, in the region administrative Laurentides, in the southwest of Quebec at Canada.

This river runs eastwards an agricultural plain skirting the northern village of "Saint-Janvier".

== Geography ==
Saint Pierre river rises between the Highway 15 and route 117, the northwest side of the village of Saint-Janvier. This source is located at:

- 5.9 kilometres (3.7 mi) north-east of the airport terminal to the Mirabel Airport;
- 14.6 kilometres (9.1 mi) north-west of rivière des Mille Îles;
- 6.6 kilometres (4.1 mi) west of the confluence of the Saint Pierre River.

Course of the river

From its source, the Saint-Pierre River flows on 9.4 kilometres (5.8 mi), according to the following segments:

- 0.8 kilometres (0.50 mi) north to the bridge of the route 117;
- 4.9 kilometres (3.0 mi) eastward, forming a detour to the north, up the road from "Côte Saint-Pierre";
- 3.7 kilometres (2.3 mi) to the south east, to the confluence of the river

The confluence of the Saint-Pierre River flows on the north bank of the Mascouche River, or 0.8 kilometres (0.50 mi) west of the city limits of Sainte-Thérèse-de-Blainville.

== Toponymy ==
The place name "Rivière Saint-Pierre" is of Christian origin. Two tributaries of the north bank of the Mascouche River are designated "Saint-Pierre River."

The place name "Saint-Pierre River" was formalized on August 8, 1977 at the "Banque de noms de lieux" (Bank of place names) of Commission de toponymie du Québec (Quebec Geographical Names Board).

== See also ==
- Mirabel, a city
- Mascouche River, a stream
- Rivière des Mille Îles, a stream
- List of rivers of Quebec
