= Pierre River =

Pierre River or Rivière Pierre may refer to:

- Pierre River (Brébeuf Lake), a tributary of Brébeuf Lake in Le Fjord-du-Saguenay Regional County Municipality, Quebec, Canada
- Pierre River (Mitchinamecus River tributary), in the unorganized territory of Baie-Obaoca, Quebec, Canada

== See also ==
- Rivière-à-Pierre (disambiguation)
- Jean-Pierre River
- Pierre-Paul River
- Saint Pierre River (disambiguation)
