= Commission scolaire des Affluents =

School district in Quebec, Canada

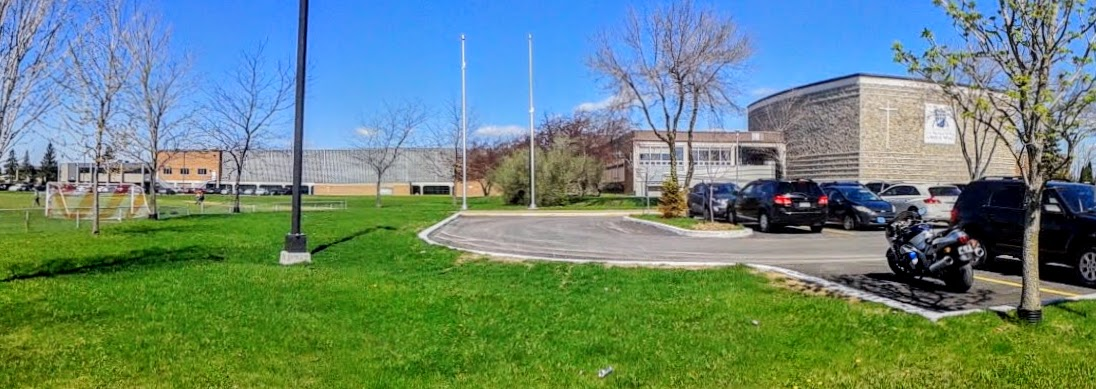
- École secondaire Jean-Baptiste-Meilleur is home to the district's headquarters.

The Commission scolaire des Affluents is a former francophone school district in the Canadian province of Quebec, headquartered in Repentigny. It comprises several primary schools and secondary schools across municipalities in the Lanaudière region. The commission is overseen by a board of elected school trustees.

== History ==
Created in 1998 by the merger of Commission scolaire de Le Gardeur, Des Manoirs, and by the annexation of part of the territory of the Commission scolaire de l'Industrie (Saint-Gérard-Majella), and Des Cascades-l'Achigan (L'Épiphanie).

== List of schools ==
Name	Location	City	Type	Year built	Year enlarged	Elevator
Alphonse-Desjardins	31, boul. Brien	Repentigny	Primary	1948, 1953		No
Alphonse-Desjardins (Lionel-Groulx)	30, rue Adrien	Repentigny	Primary	1958		Yes
Armand-Corbeil	795, rue John-F.-Kennedy	Terrebonne	Secondary	1969	1994	Yes
Au Point-du-Jour	1075, boul. Pierre-Lesueur	L'Assomption	Primary	1996		Yes
Aux 4 Vents	3000, av. Bourque	Mascouche	Primary	1980	1997, 2012	No
Aux-Quatre-Vents	903, rue Notre-Dame	Saint-Sulpice	Primary	1956, 1959	1997	Yes
Bernard-Corbin	1747, rue Rochon	Terrebonne	Primary	1980	1997, 2001	No
Centre l'Avenir	508, rue Masson	Terrebonne	Adult education	1955		No
Centre l'Avenir (950, mnt. des Pionniers)	950, mnt. des Pionniers	Terrebonne	Adult education	2004		Yes
Centre l'Avenir (Annexe de la formation à distance)	630, boul. des Seigneurs	Terrebonne	Adult education	1979		No
Centre l'Avenir (Annexe de la francisation)	663, rue Saint-Pierre	Terrebonne	Adult education			No
Centre la Croisée	777, boul. Iberville, aile C	Repentigny	Adult education	1963		No
Centre la Croisée (583, boul. Iberville)	583, boul. Iberville	Repentigny	Adult education	1981		No
Centre la Croisée (950, mnt. des Pionniers)	950, mnt. des Pionniers	Terrebonne	Adult education	2004		Yes
CFP des Moulins	2525, boul. des Entreprises	Terrebonne	Vocational training	1997	2007	Yes
CFP des Moulins (Des Industries)	3275, av. de la Gare	Mascouche	Vocational training	2022		Yes
CFP des Riverains	120, rue Valmont	Repentigny	Vocational training	1971	1993, 2011	Yes
De l'Amitié	1600, boul. de l'Ange-Gardien N	L'Assomption	Secondary	1997		Yes
De l'Aubier	1651, rue Guillemette	Terrebonne	Primary	1997	2014	Yes
De l'Étincelle	2225, boul. des Seigneurs	Terrebonne	Primary	1990	1997	Yes
De l'Odyssée	2201, rue de la Jonquille	Terrebonne	Secondary	1993	1998, 2007	Yes
De l'Orée-des-Bois	4960, rue Rodrigue	Terrebonne	Primary	1996	2013	Yes
De la Paix	830, boul. Basile-Routhier	Repentigny	Primary	1988	1997, 2013	Yes
De la Sablière	1659, boul. des Seigneurs	Terrebonne	Primary	1984	1985, 1997	Yes
De la Seigneurie	2460, rue de Versailles	Mascouche	Primary	2013		Yes
De la Source	1275, av. Châteaubriant	Mascouche	Primary	1977	1984, 2014, 2020	No
Des Explorateurs	1185, boul. des Plateaux	Terrebonne	Primary	2020		Yes
Des Hauts-Bois	99, av. Napoléon	Mascouche	Primary	1977	1992, 1998	Yes
Des Moissons	945, rue Noiseux	Repentigny	Primary	1982		Yes
Des Pionniers	1241, av. de la Croisée	Terrebonne	Primary	2017	2018	Yes
Des Rives	400, mnt. Dumais	Terrebonne	Secondary	1996	2002, 2008	Yes
Des Rivières	81, rue des Sulpiciens	L'Épiphanie	Primary	1958	1999	No
Des Rivières (Mgr-Mongeau)	119, rue Amireault	L'Épiphanie	Primary	1955	1996	No
Des Saules	55, rue Laurier	L'Assomption	Primary	2024		Yes
Des Sommets	585, rue de Saint-Gabriel	Mascouche	Primary	2021		Yes
Des Trois-Saisons	1658, boul. des Seigneurs	Terrebonne	Secondary	1995	2019	Yes
Du Boisé	5800, rue Rodrigue	Terrebonne	Primary	1985	1997, 2015	Yes
Du Coteau	2121, rue de l'Alizé	Mascouche	Secondary	2000	2021	Yes
Du Geai-Bleu	7101, rue Rodrigue	Terrebonne	Primary	1992	1997	Yes
Du Havre	1101, av. Gabrielle-Roy	Terrebonne	Secondary	2023		Yes
Du Moulin	120, boul. Laurentien	Repentigny	Primary	1986	1997	Yes
Du Soleil-Levant	3400, rue Champlain	Mascouche	Primary	1990	1998	Yes
Du Vieux-Chêne	99, crois. de la Matapédia	Terrebonne	Primary	1989	1997, 2001	Yes
Émile-Nelligan	45, rue Fiset	Repentigny	Primary	1971		No
Entramis	595, boul. de l'Assomption	Repentigny	Primary	1986		Yes
Esther-Blondin	905, rue Vaillant	Terrebonne	Primary	1977	1989	No
Félix-Leclerc	250, boul. Louis-Philippe-Picard	Repentigny	Secondary	1992	2003, 2019, 2021	Yes
Gareau	2600, boul. de l'Ange-Gardien N	L'Assomption	Primary	1961	1981, 1999, 2022	No
Henri-Bourassa	283, boul. Iberville	Repentigny	Primary	1966		No
Inst. de Charlemagne	117, rue Saint-Alexis	Charlemagne	Primary	1953		No
Inst. du Méandre	369, rue Saint-Jacques	L'Assomption	Primary	1951	1953	No
Inst. du Méandre (Mgr-Charlebois)	152, rue Marguerite-Bourgeois	L'Assomption	Primary	1960		No
Inst. Louis-Joseph-Huot	375, boul. Lacombe	Repentigny	Primary	1960		No
Inst. Louis-Joseph-Huot (Saint-Paul)	400, boul. Lacombe	Repentigny	Primary	1956		No
Jean-Baptiste-Meilleur	777, boul. Iberville	Repentigny	Secondary	1963	1969, 2023	Yes
Jean-Claude-Crevier	391, rue du Village	Repentigny	Secondary	1948	1950, 2005	No
Jean-Claude-Crevier (555, boul. Lacombe)	555, boul. Lacombe	Repentigny	Secondary	1976		Yes
Jean-De La Fontaine	192, rue de l'Église	Terrebonne	Primary	1963	1974, 1998	Yes
Jean-De La Fontaine (Saint-Charles)	3329, chem. Saint-Charles	Terrebonne	Primary	1916	1979, 1995	No
Jean-Duceppe	610, rue Jean-Duceppe	Repentigny	Primary	1992		Yes
Jean-XXIII	185, rue du Curé-Longpré	Repentigny	Primary	1959, 1965		No
L'Arc-en-ciel	273, rue Pierre-Laporte	Terrebonne	Primary	1987	1993	Yes
L'Envolée	815, rue Bombardier, suite 16	Mascouche	Secondary	1987		No
L'Envolée (Gymnase)	825, rue Bombardier	Mascouche	Secondary	1987		No
L'Horizon	239, boul. J.-A-.Paré	Repentigny	Secondary	1988	2002	Yes
L'Impact	795, rue John-F.-Kennedy, suite 101	Terrebonne	Secondary	2023		Yes
La Majuscule	210, rue Bertrand	Repentigny	Primary	1998		Yes
La Mennais	1177, rue Saint-Jean	Mascouche	Primary	1953	1967, 1992, 2014	No
La Passerelle	129, rue Notre-Dame	Repentigny	Specialist	1957	1967	No
La Tourterelle	175, rue Philippe-Goulet	Repentigny	Primary	1991	1997, 2017	Yes
Le Bourg-Neuf	168, rue Colbert	Repentigny	Primary	1989		Yes
Le Castelet	4200, rue Robert	Terrebonne	Primary	1979	1997	No
Le Prélude	2995, av. des Ancêtres	Mascouche	Secondary	1960, 1980	1991	Yes
Le Rucher	855, rue des Érables	Mascouche	Primary	1971	1984, 2014	No
Léopold-Gravel	766, rue Saint-Paul	Terrebonne	Primary	1962	1963, 1982	Yes
Longpré	249, rue Lanoue	Repentigny	Primary	1962, 1966	1968	No
Louis-Fréchette	835, rue Fréchette	Repentigny	Primary	1965	1997	No
Louis-Laberge	969, boul. Lafortune	L'Assomption	Primary	2018		Yes
Marie-Victorin	75, rue du Curé-Martineau	Repentigny	Primary	1961	1967	No
Paul-Arseneau	170, boul. Hector-Papin	L'Assomption	Secondary	1973		Yes
Pie-XII	50, rue Robert-Lussier	Repentigny	Primary	1961	1968	No
Saint-Joachim	10521, rue Villeneuve	Terrebonne	Primary	1971		No
Saint-Louis	539, rue Saint-Sacrement	Terrebonne	Primary	1950	1959, 1980, 1982	No
Soleil-de-l'Aube	761, rue du Pont	L'Assomption	Primary (alternative section)	1950		No
Tournesol	120, rue Payette	Repentigny	Primary	1981	1997	No
Valmont-sur-Parc	1155, boul. Basile-Routhier	Repentigny	Primary	2016		Yes
