= Les Moulins Regional County Municipality =

Les Moulins
- Regional county municipality
- Coordinates: 45°45′N 73°36′W
- Country: Canada
- Province: Quebec
- Region: Lanaudière
- Effective: January 1, 1982
- County seat: Terrebonne

Government
  - Type: Prefecture
  - Prefect: Guillaume Tremblay

Area
  - Total: 266.30 km^{2} (102.82 sq mi)
  - Land: 261.13 km^{2} (100.82 sq mi)

Population (2016)
  - Total: 158,267
  - Density: 606.1/km^{2} (1,570/sq mi)
  - Change 2011–2016: ▲6.4%
- Time zone: UTC−5 (EST)
  - Summer (DST): UTC−4 (EDT)
- Area codes: 450 and 579
- Website: www.mrclesmoulins.ca

Les Moulins (French pronunciation: [le mulɛ̃]) is a regional county municipality in the Lanaudière region of Quebec, Canada.

It is located immediately north of Laval on the north shore of the Rivière des Mille-Îles, and comprises the municipalities of Terrebonne and Mascouche. Historic communities in the region, which are now arrondissements of the two existing cities, include Lachenaie and La Plaine.

The population according to the 2016 Canadian Census was 158,267

== Subdivisions ==
There are 2 subdivisions within the RCM:

Cities & Towns (2)

- Mascouche
- Terrebonne

Former municipalities (2)

- La Plaine
- Lachenaie

(Both are now sectors of Terrebonne)

== Transportation ==
=== Access Routes ===
Highways and numbered routes that run through the municipality, including external routes that start or finish at the county border:

== Demographics ==
Canada Census Mother Tongue - Les moulins, Quebec
Census	Total	French			English			French & English			Other		
Year	Responses	Count	Trend	Pop %	Count	Trend	Pop %	Count	Trend	Pop %	Count	Trend	Pop %
2021	169,125	144,745	▲3.32%	85.58%	4,260	▲18.67%	2.58%	2,000	▲85.18%	1.1%	14,935	▲38.73%	8.83%
2016	157,510	140,095	▲3.37%	88.94%	3,590	▲12%	2.28%	1,080	▲11.92%	0.68%	10,765	▲41.1%	6.83%
2011	148,310	135,520	▲13.49%	91.2%	3,205	▲13.45%	2.16%	965	▲72.32%	0.66%	7,630	▲46.59%	5.14%

- Autoroutes
  - A-25
  - A-40
  - A-640
- Principal Highways
  - R-125
- Secondary Highways
  - R-335
  - R-337
  - R-344
- External Routes
  - None

== See also ==
- List of regional county municipalities and equivalent territories in Quebec
