= Mascouche =

- City
- Coat of arms

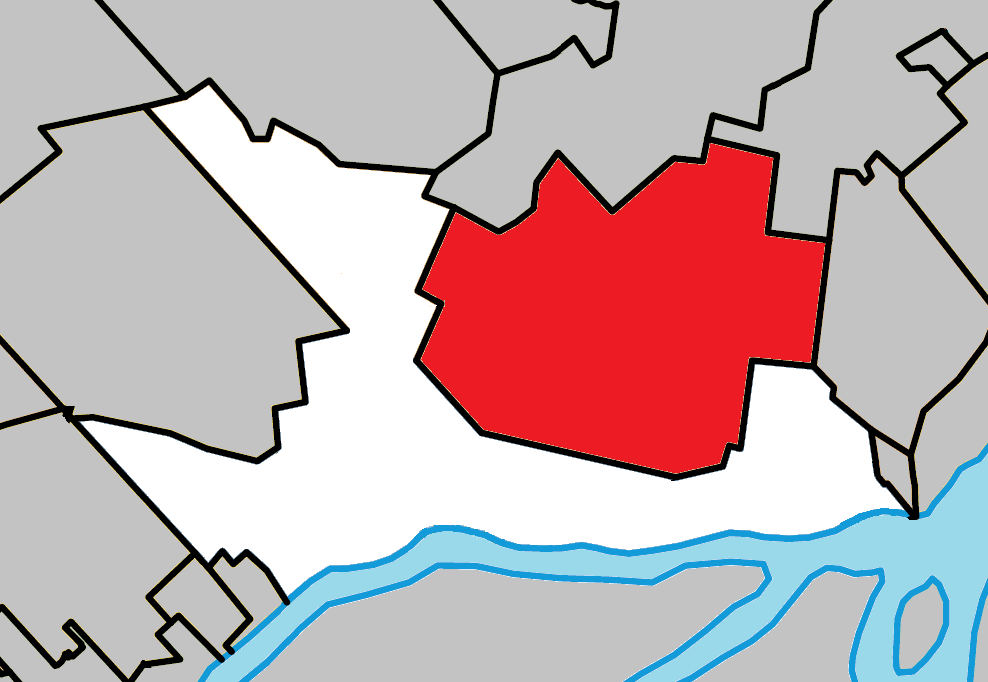
- Location (red) within Les Moulins RCM

- Location in central Quebec
- Coordinates: 45°45′N 73°36′W
- Country: Canada
- Province: Quebec
- Region: Lanaudière
- RCM: Les Moulins
- Constituted: July 1, 1855

Government
  - Mayor: Guillaume Tremblay
  - Federal riding: Montcalm
  - Prov. riding: Masson

Area
  - Total: 107.70 km^{2} (41.58 sq mi)
  - Land: 106.89 km^{2} (41.27 sq mi)

Population (2021)
  - Total: 51,183
  - Density: 478.8/km^{2} (1,240/sq mi)
  - Pop 2016–2021: ▲9.6%
- Time zone: UTC−5 (EST)
  - Summer (DST): UTC−4 (EDT)
- Postal code(s): J7K, J7L
- Area codes: 450 and 579
- Highways A-25: R-125
- Website: mascouche.ca

Mascouche (/mæsˈkuːʃ/; French: [maskuʃ]) is an off-island suburb of Montreal, in southern Quebec, Canada. The city is located on the Mascouche River within the Les Moulins Regional County Municipality and has a population of 51,183, ranking 20th among Quebec municipalities.

The name comes from Algonquin word maskutchew meaning "bear plain" in singular. Compare plural form to maskutew for the Les Maskoutains Regional County Municipality located nearby.

== History ==
Mascouche (then known as Saint-Henri-de-Mascouche) received city status on December 9, 1970, under mayor Gilles Forest.

On June 21, 2021, the city was struck by an EF2 tornado, killing one person.

== Infrastructure ==
Montréal/Mascouche Airport, the largest regional airport in Quebec, was three kilometres southeast of the city. It has now been replaced by the CentrOparc, a business district with the ambition of joining a transit-oriented urban development (DOT).

Highways 640 and 25, both major national transportation routes, meet just south of the centre of the city.

Mascouche is connected to Montreal's Central Station by commuter rail via the Mascouche station of the Réseau de transport métropolitain's Mascouche line.

L'Étang-du-Grand-Coteau, an urban park situated in the city centre on Mascouche Boulevard, has the same area as Mount Royal Park in Montreal.

== Demographics ==
Historical Census Data - Mascouche, Quebec
Year	Pop.	±%
1991	25,828	—
1996	28,097	+8.8%
2001	29,556	+5.2%
2006	33,764	+14.2%
2011	42,491	+25.8%
2016	46,692	+9.9%
2021	51,183	+9.6%

In the 2021 Census of Population conducted by Statistics Canada, Mascouche had a population of 51,183 living in 19,981 of its 20,290 total private dwellings, a change of 9.6% from its 2016 population of 46,692. With a land area of 106.89 km^{2} (41.27 sq mi), it had a population density of 478.8/km^{2} (1,240.2/sq mi) in 2021.

Canada census – Mascouche community profile

	2021	2011
Population	51,183 (+9.6% from 2016)	42,491 (+25.8% from 2006)
Land area	106.89 km^{2} (41.27 sq mi)	106.64 km^{2} (41.17 sq mi)
Population density	478.8/km^{2} (1,240/sq mi)	398.4/km^{2} (1,032/sq mi)
Median age	40.4 (M: 39.6, F: 41.2)	36.5 (M: 36.2, F: 36.9)
Private dwellings	20,290 (total) 19,981 (occupied)	16,290 (total)
Median household income	$93,000	$70,673

References: 2021 2011

Canada Census Mother Tongue - Mascouche, Quebec
Census	Total	French			English			French & English			Other		
Year	Responses	Count	Trend	Pop %	Count	Trend	Pop %	Count	Trend	Pop %	Count	Trend	Pop %
2016	46 375	42 740	▲7.03%	92.10%	1 150	▲12.17%	2.47%	355	▲120.0%	0.76%	1 840	▲39.39%	3.96%
2011	42,185	39,580	▲25.8%	93.82%	1,010	▲5.2%	2.39%	275	▲29.09%	0.65%	1,320	▲26.3%	3.13%
2006	33,600	31,470	▲13.4%	93.66%	960	▲17.1%	2.86%	125	▼40.5%	0.37%	1,045	▲111.1%	3.11%
2001	29,285	27,760	▲5.0%	94.79%	820	▼9.4%	2.80%	210	▲82.6%	0.72%	495	▲3.1%	1.69%
1996	27,930	26,430	n/a	94.63%	905	n/a	3.24%	115	n/a	0.41%	480	n/a	1.72%

== Mayors ==
1. André Duval (1955–1965)
2. Gilles Forest (1965–1983)
3. Bernard Patenaude (1983–1992)
4. Richard Marcotte (1992–2012)
5. Denise Paquette (2012–2013)
6. Guillaume Tremblay (2013–present)

Photograph of the rear wings and the mill of the Le Gardeur de Repentigny manor (or Pangman Manor) in Saint-Henri-de-Mascouche (now Mascouche). The Mascouche River is visible in the view.

== Environment ==
In March 2025, the Canadian government deciede to dispose 80,000 tonnes of soil heavily contaminated with "forever chemicals"—substances that are potentially carcinogenic— by burying them at a site in Mascouche.

== Education ==
The Commission scolaire des Affluents operates Francophone public schools. They include:

Primary schools:

- L'école Aux 4 Vents
- L'école De la Source
- L'école La Mennais
- L'école des Hauts-Bois
- L'école Soleil-Levant
- L'école Le Rucher
- L'école de La Seigneurie

Secondary schools :

- École secondaire Le Prélude
- École secondaire Du Coteau

One professional school, École L'Impact.

Sir Wilfrid Laurier School Board operates Anglophone public schools:

- Pinewood Elementary School in Mascouche serves the western portion
- Franklin Hill Elementary School in Repentigny serves the eastern portion
- Rosemere High School (all areas) in Rosemere

== Famous residents ==
Mascouche is the hometown of baseball player Éric Gagné.

It is also Émilie Mondor's hometown, a Canadian Olympic athlete, who was a two-time national champion in the women's 5,000 metres.

== See also ==
- Mascouche River
- Saint Pierre River (Mascouche)
- Les Moulins Regional County Municipality
- List of cities in Quebec
