= Barrington, Quebec =

Barrington
- Hamlet
- Location in southern Quebec.
- Coordinates: 45°6′39.599″N 73°34′22.799″W
- Country: Canada
- Province: Quebec
- Region: Montérégie
- RCM: Les Jardins-de-Napierville
- Constituted: July 1, 1855

Government
  - Mayor: Paul Viau
  - Federal riding: Beauharnois—Salaberry
  - Prov. riding: Huntingdon
- Time zone: UTC−5 (EST)
  - Summer (DST): UTC−4 (EDT)
- Postal code(s): J0L 1H0
- Area codes: 450 and 579
- Highways: R-219
- Website: www.hemmingford.ca

Barrington is a hamlet in the Township of Hemmingford, located at the junction of Rte 219 and Fisher Road. It was previously called Johnson's Corners. Barrington was Mr. Johnson's middle name.

The Barrington Post Office operated from a store at Barrington from 1861 until 1969. It was previously called Johnson's Corners Post Office.

A railway station used to be located about 1 km (0.6 mi)(45.121N/73.573W) north of Barrington at the junction of the Canada Atlantic Railway line to Cantic and the Grand Trunk Railway line to Hemmingford (both now abandoned). On current Google Maps the same spot is called 'The Crutch' - meaning unknown. Barrington Station was also known as Johnson's Station. A recreation of the station with original sign is located at Canadian Railway Museum in Delson, Quebec.

== See also ==
- Township of Hemmingford
- Village of Hemmingford
