= Saint-Philippe, Quebec =

Saint-Philippe
- City
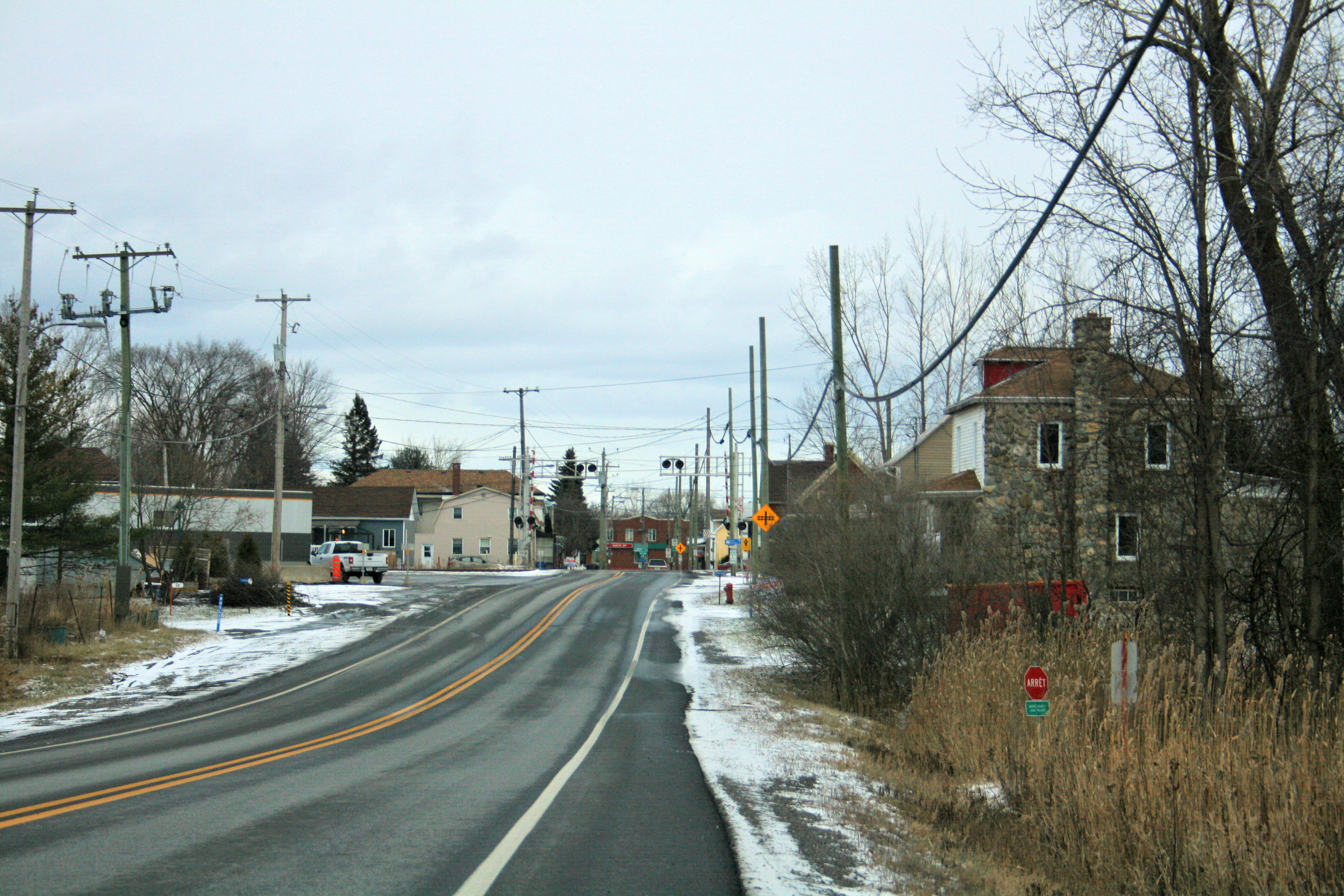

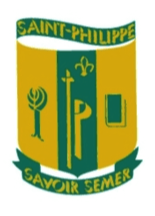
- Coat of arms

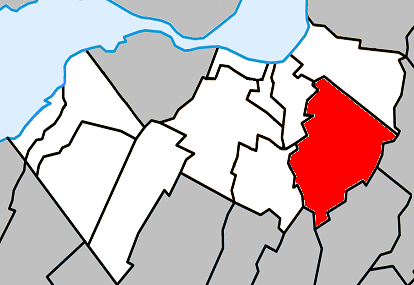
- Location within Roussillon RCM

- Location in southern Quebec
- Coordinates: 45°21′N 73°28′W
- Country: Canada
- Province: Quebec
- Region: Montérégie
- RCM: Roussillon
- Constituted: July 1, 1855

Government
  - Mayor: Christian Marin
  - Federal riding: La Prairie
  - Prov. riding: La Prairie

Area
  - Total: 62.10 km^{2} (23.98 sq mi)
  - Land: 61.96 km^{2} (23.92 sq mi)

Population (2021)
  - Total: 7,597
  - Density: 122.6/km^{2} (318/sq mi)
  - Pop (2016-21): ▲20.2%
  - Dwellings: 2,921
- Time zone: UTC−5 (EST)
  - Summer (DST): UTC−4 (EDT)
- Postal code(s): J0L 2K0
- Area codes: 450 and 579
- Highways A-30: R-217
- Website: ville.saintphilippe.quebec

Saint-Philippe (French pronunciation: [sɛ̃ filip]) is a city located in Roussillon Regional County Municipality in the Montérégie region of Quebec, Canada. It was established on July 1, 1855. The population as of the Canada 2021 Census was 7,597.

== History ==
The City of Saint-Philippe, officially constituted as a city in 2016, has origins that date back to the 17th century.

Originally, Saint-Philippe was part of the territory of the Seigneurie de La Prairie-de-la-Magdeleine, which covered the current territory of the municipalities of La Prairie, Brossard, Candiac, Sainte-Catherine and Saint -Philippe, as well as part of the territory of the municipalities of Saint-Lambert, Delson, Saint-Constant, Saint-Jean-sur-Richelieu and Saint-Jacques-le-Mineur. In 1647, the seigneury of La Prairie-de-la-Madeleine was granted by Jean de Lauzon to Abbé Jean de Laferté, a Jesuit and parish priest of La Madeleine in Paris. It was in 1667 that the first families settled.

In 1744, the first parish of Saint-Philippe, the Fabrique de la côte Saint-Philippe, was founded. It is following the cessation of eight arpents of land, in the Saint-Philippe coast of the Lordship of La Prairie-de-la-Magdeleine, by Sieur Louis Proveau and his wife Marianne Girou, and Dame Marie-Angélique Maheu, widow of the late Sieur Pierre François Girou, who allowed the construction of the first church. This was blessed in 1751, under the title of Saint-Jean-François-Régis, the patron saint of the Jesuits in the province of France. The second church of Saint-Philippe, the first built of stone, was blessed in 1782. This will contribute to the acceleration of the settlement of the small community. The second church was in place until the partial fire of January 1843 and the blessing of the rebuilt church took place at the end of the same year. Quickly becoming too small, a third church was built and blessed at the end of 1876. The new adjacent presbytery, which still exists today, was blessed in 1885.

On June 23, 1972, the neo-Gothic style church burned down. It was an extremely rare example of this architectural type. The inauguration of the new church, in 1973, of more modern architecture, contrasts with the old one.

The arrival of the 19th century brought its share of changes for Saint-Philippe. The successive legislative changes in Lower Canada have an impact on the status of the municipality, and this, on several occasions. The Municipality of the Parish of Saint-Philippe was created in 1845, under the leadership of Mr. Amable Coupal, the first mayor of Saint-Philippe.

Two years later, in 1847, following the adoption of the "Act to make better provisions for the establishment of municipal authorities in Lower Canada", the Municipality of the Parish of Saint-Philippe was abolished, thus becoming part of the county of Huntingdon.

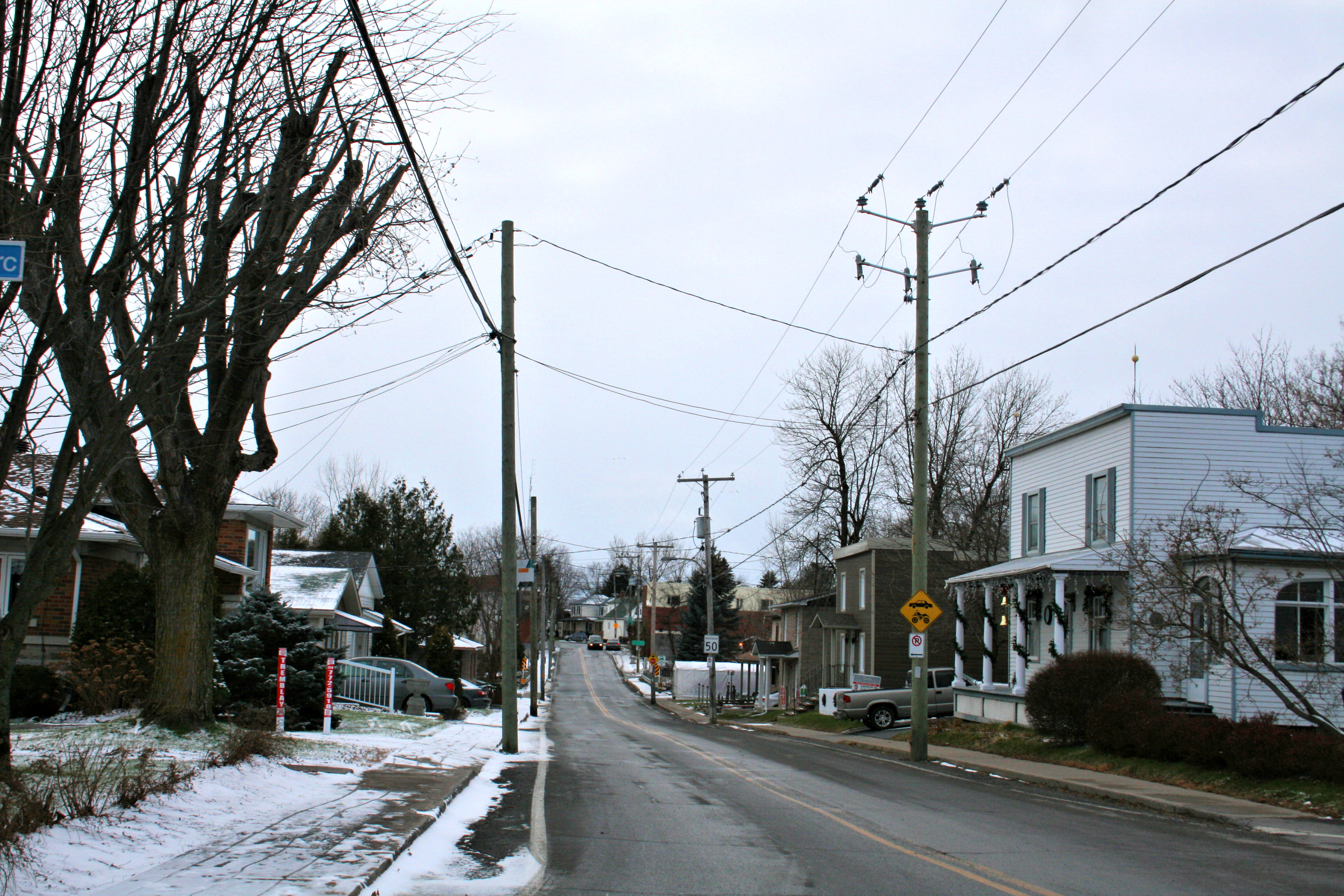
Montée Monette

It was not until 1855, following the adoption of the "Lower Canada Municipalities and Roads Act" that the municipality of the Parish of Saint-Philippe regained its name and status. It is this law that established the foundations of the municipal system in force today in Quebec. The first mayor of Saint-Philippe under this new regime was Mr. Joseph Normandin, who was also the son-in-law of Amable Coupal.

In 1841, by decree of canonical erection, the parish of Saint-Philippe is recognized on the religious level by specifying its boundaries. However, two other municipalities were created from the territory of Saint-Philippe, namely the municipality of Saint-Mathieu in 1917 and the City of Candiac in 1957.

The arrival of a major road infrastructure, Highway 15, in 1966 and a first section of Highway 30, comes to structure and define the space of the municipality.

On October 22, 2016, the Municipality, following a request to the Ministry of Municipal Affairs and Housing, changed its legislative regime and became subject to the Cities and Towns Act (CQLR, chapter C-19 ). At the same time, the Minister approves the change of name of the Municipality of Saint-Philippe to that of City of Saint-Philippe.

== Demographics ==
In the 2021 Census of Population conducted by Statistics Canada, Saint-Philippe had a population of 7,597 living in 2,856 of its 2,921 total private dwellings, a change of 20.2% from its 2016 population of 6,320. With a land area of 61.96 km^{2} (23.92 sq mi), it had a population density of 122.6/km^{2} (317.6/sq mi) in 2021.

Canada census – Saint-Philippe community profile

	2021	2016	2011
Population	7,597 (+20.2% from 2016)	6,320 (+15.0% from 2011)	5,495 (+7.3% from 2006)
Land area	61.96 km^{2} (23.92 sq mi)	61.95 km^{2} (23.92 sq mi)	62.07 km^{2} (23.97 sq mi)
Population density	122.6/km^{2} (318/sq mi)	102.0/km^{2} (264/sq mi)	88.5/km^{2} (229/sq mi)
Median age	37.6 (M: 38.0, F: 37.6)	38.6 (M: 38.6, F: 38.6)	38.3 (M: 38.5, F: 38.1)
Private dwellings	2,921 (total) 2,856 (occupied)	2,627 (total)	2,129 (total)
Median household income	$103,000	$79,842	$70,522

References: 2021 2016 2011

Historical Census Data - Saint-Philippe, Quebec

Year	Pop.	±%
1861	2,344	—
1871	1,754	−25.2%
1881	1,655	−5.6%
1891	1,716	+3.7%
1901	1,707	−0.5%
1911	1,615	−5.4%
1921	1,264	−21.7%
1931	1,231	−2.6%

Year	Pop.	±%
1941	1,127	−8.4%
1951	1,214	+7.7%
1956	1,293	+6.5%
1961	1,327	+2.6%
1966	1,573	+18.5%
1971	1,657	+5.3%
1976	2,292	+38.3%
1981	3,169	+38.3%

Year	Pop.	±%
1986	3,357	+5.9%
1991	3,572	+6.4%
1996	3,656	+2.4%
2001	3,892	+6.5%
2006	5,121	+31.6%
2011	5,495	+7.3%
2016	6,320	+15.0%
2021	7,597	+20.2%

Population counts are not adjusted for boundary changes.
Source: Statistics Canada

Canada Census Mother Tongue - Saint-Philippe, Quebec
Census	Total	French			English			French & English			Other		
Year	Responses	Count	Trend	Pop %	Count	Trend	Pop %	Count	Trend	Pop %	Count	Trend	Pop %
2021	7,595	6,605	▲13.3%	87.0%	270	▲31.7%	3.6%	120	▲100.0%	1.6%	520	▲166.7%	6.8%
2016	6,320	5,830	▲13.8%	92.2%	205	▲17.1%	3.2%	60	▲9.1%	0.9%	195	▲56.0%	3.1%
2011	5,480	5,125	▲5.3%	93.5%	175	▼5.4%	3.2%	55	▲37.5%	1.0%	125	▲257.1%	2.3%
2006	5,115	4,855	▲31.8%	94.9%	185	▲76.2%	3.6%	40	▲300.0%	0.8%	35	▼53.3%	0.7%
2001	3,875	3,685	▲5.4%	95.1%	105	▲10.5%	2.7%	10	▼71.4%	0.3%	75	▲400.0%	1.9%
1996	3,640	3,495	n/a	96.0%	95	n/a	2.6%	35	n/a	1.0%	15	n/a	0.4%

== Attractions ==
The Élodie-P.-Babin Complex is home to the Recreation, Culture and Community Life Department, the "Le Vaisseau d'Or" library, the Café Liberté 50 and Maison des jeunes organizations. It also hosts various recognized organizations for holding their regular activities.

== Infrastructure ==
The CIT Le Richelain provides commuter and local bus services.

== Education ==
Centre de services scolaire des Grandes-Seigneuries is the French school board.

- École secondaire Fernand-Seguin in Candiac
- École primaire des Moussaillons-et-de-la-Traversée (Saint-Philippe)
  - pavillon de la Traversée
  - pavillon des Moussaillons

Riverside School Board serves as the English school board.

- St. Lawrence Elementary School in Candiac
- Heritage Regional High School in Longueuil

== Notable people ==
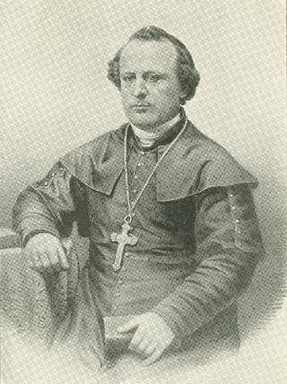
Bishop Pierre-Adolphe Pinsonnault

It's the birthplace of Pierre-Adolphe Pinsonnault, first Roman Catholic bishop of London.

== See also ==
- List of cities and towns in Quebec
