= Centre de services scolaire des Grandes-Seigneuries =

The Centre de services scolaire des Grandes-Seigneuries is a francophone school service centre in the Canadian province of Quebec. It comprises several primary schools and high schools across municipalities in the Vallée-du-Haut-Saint-Laurent (Montérégie) region.

== Territory ==
=== District no 1 ===
Municipalités :

- Hemmingford
- Mercier
- Napierville
- Saint-Bernard-de-Lacolle
- Saint-Cyprien-de-Napierville
- Saint-Édouard
- Saint-Isidore
- Saint-Michel
- Saint-Patrice-de-Sherrington
- Saint-Rémi
- Sainte-Clotilde

=== District no 2 ===
Municipies :

- Saint-Constant
- Saint-Mathieu

=== District no 3 ===
Municipies :

- Châteauguay
- Kahnawake
- Léry

=== District no 4 ===
Municipies :

- Candiac
- Delson
- Sainte-Catherine

=== District no 5 ===
Municipies :

- La Prairie
- Saint-Philippe
