= Quebec Autoroute 15 =

Highway in Quebec

Autoroute 15
- Route Transcanadienne
- Autoroute Décarie; Autoroute des Laurentides

Route information
- Maintained by Transports Québec
- Length: 164 km (102 mi)
- Existed: 1958 –present

Major junctions
- South end: I-87 at the U.S. border in Saint-Bernard-de-Lacolle
- A-30 / A-930 in Candiac; A-10 / A-20 in Brossard; A-10 in Montréal; A-20 / R-136 in Montréal; A-40 (TCH) in Montréal; A-440 in Laval; A-640 in Boisbriand; A-50 in Mirabel
- North end: R-117 (TCH) in Sainte-Agathe-des-Monts

Location
- Country: Canada
- Province: Quebec
- Major cities: Brossard, Montreal, Laval, Blainville, Saint-Jérôme

Highway system
- Trans-Canada Highway; Quebec provincial highways; Autoroutes; List; Former
← A-13	→ A-19

Autoroute 15 is a highway in western Quebec, Canada. It is also called the Décarie Expressway (English) or Autoroute Décarie (French) between the Turcot and Décarie Interchanges in Montreal and the Laurentian Autoroute (English) or Autoroute des Laurentides (French) north of Autoroute 40. It was, until the extension of Autoroute 25 was opened in 2011, the only existing north-south autoroute to fully cross Montreal. A-15 begins at the end of Interstate 87 at the United States border at Saint-Bernard-de-Lacolle and extends via Montreal to Sainte-Agathe-des-Monts with an eventual continuation beyond Mont-Tremblant. The total length of A-15 is 164 km (101.9 mi), including a short concurrency (4 km or 2.5 mi) with Autoroute 40 (Boulevard/Autoroute Métropolitan) that connects the two main sections.

== Road description ==
=== Southern section ===
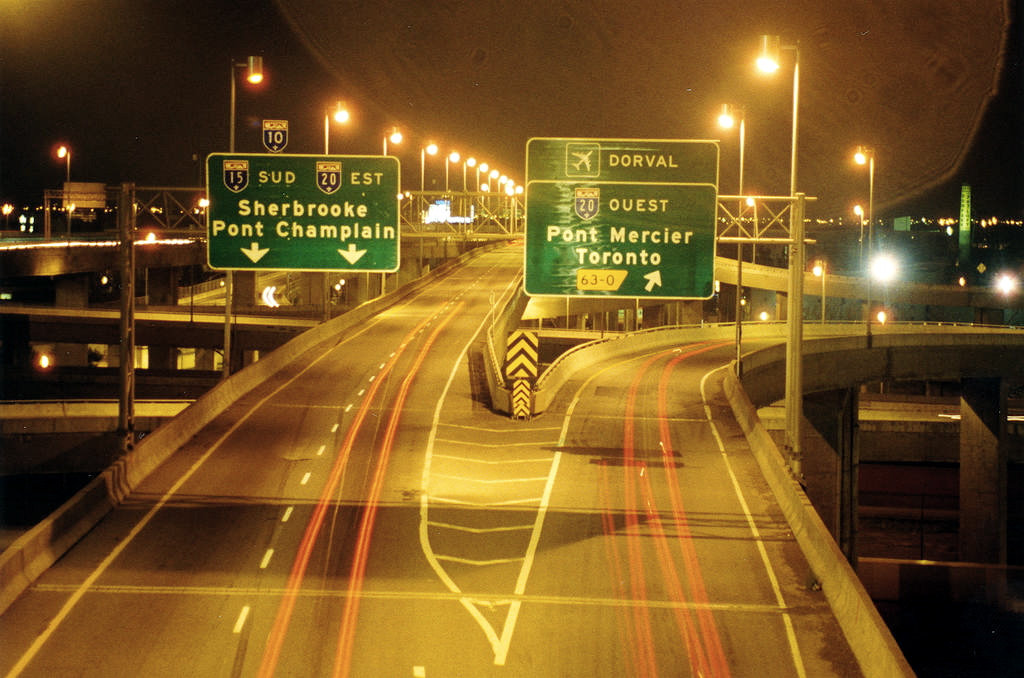
Autoroute 15 in Montreal, facing southwards at the Autoroute 20 junction (Exit 63)

The southern section of A-15 connects the south shore suburbs of Montreal and is also the primary trade corridor route between Montreal and New York City linking Quebec Autoroute 15 to Interstate 87 at the Canada-United States border at the Champlain-St. Bernard de Lacolle Border Crossing. This was the former Route 9, and connected with US 9 on the western shore of Lake Champlain. In Brossard, it joins up with A-10 and A-20 across the Champlain Bridge into Montreal. The A-10 splits off almost immediately after crossing the bridge to head into downtown Montreal at the Bonaventure Expressway and the A-20 splits off shortly after at the Turcot Interchange (échangeur Turcot), leaving the A-15 to continue northward as Autoroute Décarie until the Décarie Interchange (échangeur Décarie) with the A-40 at the point where it turns from the Trans-Canada into the Metropolitan Expressway.

The route is also connected to Autoroute 30 in Candiac which was completed to Autoroute 20 in 2012 providing quick access to the south shore of Montreal, to southern communities located alongside Autoroute 15 and to the Canada–US border in Lacolle. It will also give quicker access from there to areas west of Montreal and also Ottawa and Gatineau.

==== Décarie Autoroute ====
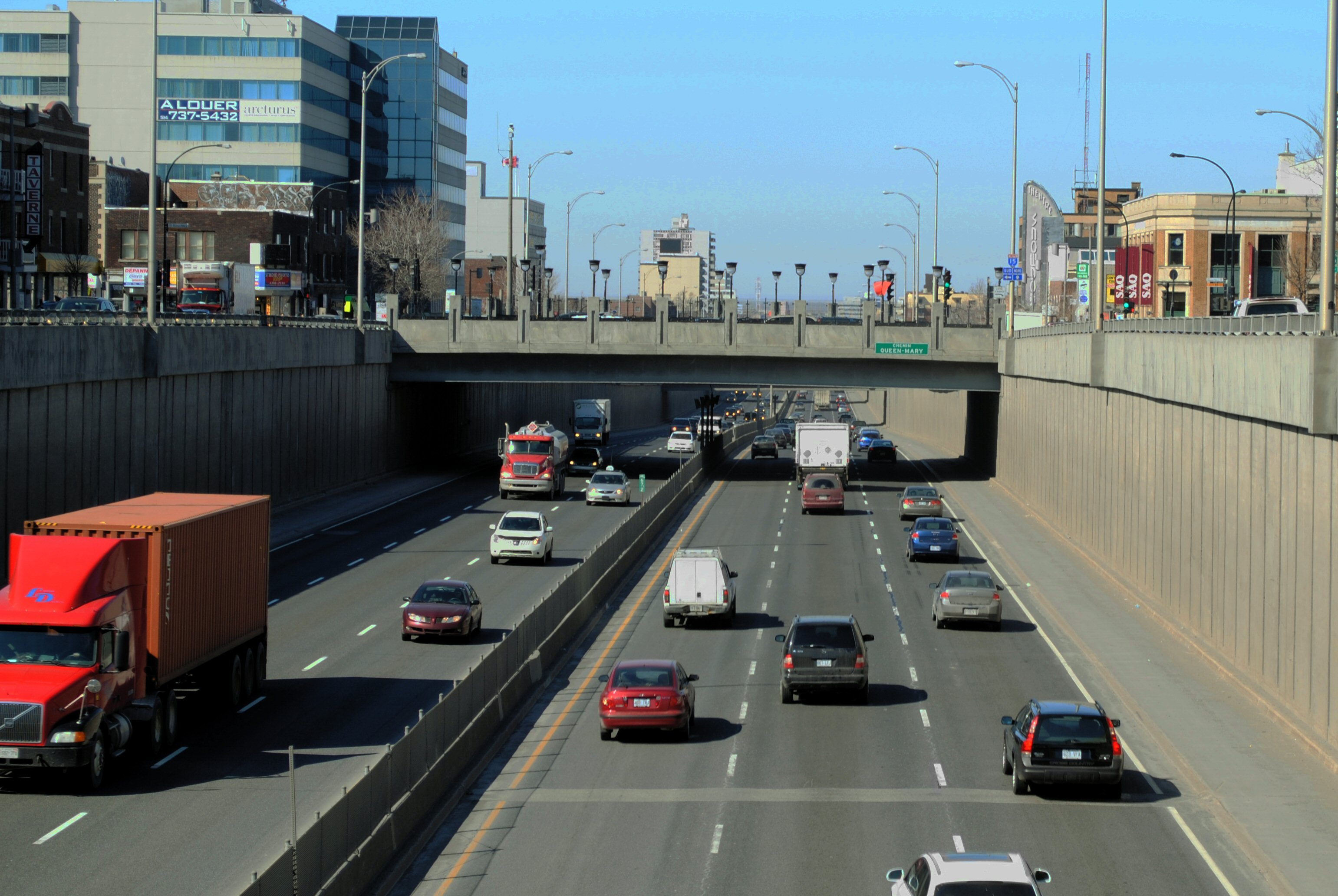
Décarie Highway (North) at the height of Queen Mary Road

The Décarie Autoroute is a sunken highway between the northbound and southbound lanes of Decarie Boulevard from the Metropolitan Autoroute at its northern end to Monkland Avenue and the Villa Maria Metro station at its southern end. It was built on a wide expanse of vacant land, donated to the city by the Décarie estate on the condition that a streetcar line would be established. The decommissioning of the streetcar system in 1959 left the right-of-way as an obvious choice for a highway and so the Décarie Autoroute was dug there. South of Queen Mary Road, however, a significant number of houses were demolished.

To avoid demolishing Notre-Dame-de-Grâce Church, the highway makes a slight westerly jog below Côte-Saint-Luc Road and runs through a short tunnel, before emerging between Addington and Botrel Streets and running down to Sherbrooke Street and Saint Jacques Street, where it spectacularly goes from being below the ground to well above the ground as it intersects with Autoroute 20 and Route 136 in the infamous Turcot Interchange (dubbed "Spaghetti Junction" by train crews operating the former CN Rail Turcot Yard). Following the conversion from streetcar line to the highway, the Décarie estate sued the city but was unable to prevail because it did not document its case well enough for the nevertheless sympathetic court.

==== Décarie Boulevard ====
Décarie Boulevard itself continues; from Monkland Avenue south to Saint Jacques Street past the McGill University Health Centre Glen Campus superhospital; and from Autoroute 40 north into Montreal past Du College station and Côte-Vertu station/Norgate shopping centre to Poirier Street. Between Monkland Avenue and A 40, Décarie Boulevard serves as sort of a service road on both sides of the autoroute.

=== Northern section ===
After its concurrency with A-40, the northern section of A-15 is the main highway route to the Laurentian Mountains or Laurentides, until it downgrades to Route 117. It also links up to the northern suburbs of Montreal, as well as provides a connection to the A-440, A-640 and the A-50 in Mirabel. The first section from A-40 to Saint-Jérôme was opened on August 29, 1959 (source Montreal Star Aug. 29, 1959, page 3) as a toll road, although the tolls were removed in 1985. This section was also the first to be designed as an autoroute in the province. It was named Autoroute Montréal-Laurentides during the 1960s.

Over the next years, it was extended north to Sainte-Agathe-des-Monts as a new connection to touristic and skiing destinations in the Laurentides including in Saint-Sauveur, Sainte-Adèle and Estérel. In the future, it is possible that the A-15 may continue even farther north, past Mont-Tremblant, as Route 117 is already an at-grade expressway with a freeway bypass of Mont-Tremblant completed, and the name Autoroute des Laurentides is also recognized on the freeway bypass (and exit numbers continue). This section is numbered separately from the southern section as if it were a different route. The northern route is also part of the Trans-Canada Highway.

== Exit list ==
Exit numbering resets at the two interchanges with Autoroute 40 in Montréal.

RCM	Location	km	mi	Exit	Destinations	Notes
Les Jardins-de-Napierville	Saint-Bernard-de-Lacolle	0.00	0.00	–	I-87 south (Adirondack Northway) to US 9 south – Albany, New York	Continues into New York
Les Jardins-de-Napierville	Saint-Bernard-de-Lacolle	0.00	0.00	Canada–United States border at Champlain–St. Bernard de Lacolle Border Crossing		
Les Jardins-de-Napierville	Saint-Bernard-de-Lacolle	0.3	0.19	–	Chemin Ridge / Chemin Guay	Intersection with stop signs; U-turn possible; no southbound entrance from Chemin Ridge
Les Jardins-de-Napierville	Saint-Bernard-de-Lacolle	1.08	0.67	1	Montée Glass / Montée Guay	Also signed as a U-turn for I-87
Les Jardins-de-Napierville	Saint-Bernard-de-Lacolle	3.73	2.32	Jardins-de-Napierville Rest Stop (Northbound) - 24 hours with rest rooms		
Les Jardins-de-Napierville	Saint-Bernard-de-Lacolle	6.50	4.04	6	R-202 – Hemmingford, Saint-Bernard-de-Lacolle, Lacolle	
Les Jardins-de-Napierville	Saint-Bernard-de-Lacolle	11.05	6.87	11	Montée Henrysburg	
Les Jardins-de-Napierville	Saint-Bernard-de-Lacolle - Saint-Cyprien-de-Napierville boundary	13.11	8.15	13	Montée Murray	Southbound exit only
Les Jardins-de-Napierville	Saint-Patrice-de-Sherrington - Saint-Jacques-le-Mineur boundary	20.91	12.99	21	R-219 / R-221 – Napierville, Saint-Patrice-de-Sherrington	Also serves R-217
Roussillon	Saint-Jacques-le-Mineur - Saint-Édouard boundary	29.83	18.54	29	Saint-Édouard, Saint-Jacques-le-Mineur	Via Montée du Moulin
Roussillon	Saint-Mathieu	38.14	23.70	38	Saint-Mathieu, Saint-Philippe	Via Montée Monette
Roussillon	Delson - Candiac boundary	40.73	25.31	40	A-30 west (Autoroute de l'Acier) – Pont Honoré-Mercier, Vaudreuil-Dorion	Exit 55 on A-30; opened December 2010
Roussillon	Candiac	42.92	26.67	42	A-930 east to A-30 east / R-132 west – Sorel-Tracy, Québec, Saint-Constant, Sainte-Catherine	South end of R-132 concurrency; shared ramp with exit 40 northbound
Roussillon	Candiac	45.08– 45.73	28.01– 28.42	44	Boulevard Montcalm – Candiac	
Roussillon	Candiac - La Prairie boundary	45.28	28.14	45	R-134 east (Boulevard Taschereau) – La Prairie	Northbound exit and southbound entrance; R-134 southern terminus
Roussillon	La Prairie	45.73– 47.29	28.42– 29.38	46	Boulevard Salaberry – La Prairie	
Roussillon	La Prairie	47.95	29.79	47	Rue Saint-Henri – La Prairie	Northbound exit and entrance
Roussillon	La Prairie	48.61	30.20	49	Rue du Quai	Southbound exit and entrance; to Parc de la Marina
Longueuil	Brossard	49.83– 51.20	30.96– 31.81	50	Boulevard Matte; Boulevard Rivard	Boulevard Rivard appears on southbound signage
Longueuil	Brossard	50.71– 52.27	31.51– 32.48	51	Boulevard Rivard; Rue Riviera	Boulevard Rivard on northbound signage; Rue Riviera on southbound signage
Longueuil	Brossard	51.71	32.13	52	Boulevard Rome	No southbound exit; southbound access through service road via exit 75 on A-20 or exit 6 on A-10
Longueuil	Brossard	52.91– 54.06	32.88– 33.59	53 6	A-10 east (Autoroute des Cantons-de-l'Est) to A-30 / I-89 – Sherbrooke, Vermont A-20 east (Autoroute René-Lévesque) / R-132 east – Longueuil, Varennes	North end of R-132 concurrency; south end A-10 / A-20 concurrency; northbound signed as exit 53; southbound signed as exit 6; A-10 exit 6; A-20 west exit 75
St. Lawrence River		54.74– 57.62	34.01– 35.80	Pont Champlain		
Montréal	Montréal	57.90– 58.41	35.98– 36.29	57	Boulevard de Île des Sœurs, Chemin de la Pointe Nord	Southbound exit and northbound entrance; signed as 57S for Île des Sœurs and 57N for Chemin de la Pointe Nord
Montréal	Montréal	57.90– 58.41	35.98– 36.29	58	A-10 west – Montreal Centre-ville, Île des Sœurs	Northbound exit and southbound entrance; west end of A-10 concurrency; A-10 exit 5
Montréal	Montréal	71.8	44.6	60	To A-10 west / Boulevard Gaétan-Laberge, Rue Wellington – Montreal Centre-ville	A-10 exit 4; southbound access to A-10 west (unsigned)
Montréal	Montréal	60.76	37.75	61	Rue Saint Patrick / Avenue Atwater	
Montréal	Montréal	62.00	38.53	62	Boulevard de La Vérendrye / Avenue de l'Église	
Montréal	Montréal	63.58	39.51	63	A-20 west (Autoroute du Souvenir) / R-136 east (Autoroute Ville-Marie) – Centre-Ville, Aéroport P.-E.-Trudeau, Toronto	Turcot Interchange; Northern terminus of concurrency with A-20; signed as exits 63E (east) and 63O (west) southbound; A-20 exit 68; R-136 exit 1
Montréal	Montréal	63.58	39.51	Southern terminus of Autoroute Décarie		
Montréal	Montréal	64.27– 65.02	39.94– 40.40	64	Rue Sherbrooke (R-138) / Rue Saint-Jacques	
Montréal	Montréal	65.38– 67.24	40.63– 41.78	66	Chemin Côte-Saint-Luc / Chemin Queen-Mary / Chemin de la Côte-Sainte-Catherine	
Montréal	Montréal	68.32– 69.34	42.45– 43.09	69	Rue Jean-Talon / Rue de la Savane / Avenue Van Horne / Chemin de la Côte-Sainte-Catherine	
Montréal	Montréal - Mont-Royal boundary	70.50	43.81	70 66 (Note: A-40 exit number)	A-40 (TCH) west (Autoroute Félix-Leclerc) to A-520 – Aéroport P.-E.-Trudeau, Gatineau, Ottawa	Décarie Interchange; A-15 branches east; southern terminus of concurrency with of A-40
Montréal	Montréal - Mont-Royal boundary	70.50	43.81	70 66	Boulevard Marcel-Laurin (R-117 north) / Boulevard Décarie	Northbound exit, southbound entrance
Montréal	Montréal - Mont-Royal boundary	70.50	43.81	Northern terminus of Autoroute Décarie		
Montréal	Montréal - Mont-Royal boundary	71.35	44.33	68	Rue Stinson / Chemin Rockland / Boulevard de L'Acadie	Northbound exit and southbound entrance
Montréal	Montréal - Mont-Royal boundary	73.00	45.36	70 1	A-40 (TCH) east (Autoroute Métropolitaine) to R-335 (Rue Saint-Denis) / Boulevard Saint-Laurent – Québec	A-15 branches north; northern terminus of concurrency with A-40
Montréal	Montréal - Mont-Royal boundary	73.00	45.36	70 1	Boulevard Marcel-Laurin (R-117 north) / Chemin Rockland / Boulevard de L'Acadie	Southbound exit
Montréal	Montréal - Mont-Royal boundary	73.00	45.36	Southern terminus of Trans-Canada Highway designation and Autoroute des Laurentides		
Montréal	Montréal	74.25	46.14	2	Boulevard de la Côte-Vertu / Boulevard Lebeau	Southbound exit and northbound entrance
Montréal	Montréal			2	Rue Sauvé / Boulevard Henri-Bourassa / Boulevard de L'Acadie	Northbound exit and entrance
Montréal	Montréal	75.73	47.06	3	Boulevard Henri-Bourassa	Northbound exit is via exit 2
Montréal	Montréal	77.22	47.98	4	Rue de Salaberry	Signed as exits 4E (east) and 4O (west) southbound; no southbound entrance
Rivière des Prairies		78.02– 78.30	48.48– 48.65	Pont Médéric-Martin		
Laval		79.05– 81.10	49.12– 50.39	7	Boulevard Cartier / Boulevard de la Concorde / Boulevard Notre-Dame	Northbound entrance and exit via Le Corbusier Boulevard
Laval		80.19	49.83	8	Boulevard Saint-Martin	No direct southbound exit; southbound exit is via exit 10; former R-148
Laval		81.93– 84.13	50.91– 52.28	10	A-440 (Autoroute Jean-Noël-Lavoie) / Boulevard le Carrefour	Exit 22 on A-440
Laval		86.41	53.69	14	R-117 (Boulevard Curé Labelle) / Boulevard Dagenais west	Signed as exits 14N (north) and 14S (south) southbound
Laval		88.47	54.97	16	Boulevard Sainte-Rose / Avenue de la Renaissance	
Rivière des Mille Îles		89.64– 90.64	55.70– 56.32	Gedeon Ouimet Bridge		
Thérèse-De Blainville	Boisbriand	91.26	56.71	19	R-344 – Boisbriand, Rosemère	
Thérèse-De Blainville	Boisbriand	92.81	57.67	20	A-640 to A-13 – Repentigny, Québec, Boisbriand, Saint-Eustache, Sainte-Thérèse, Aéroport P.-E.-Trudeau	Signed as exits 20E (east) and 20O (west); exit 20 on A-640
Thérèse-De Blainville	Sainte-Thérèse - Mirabel boundary	95.66	59.44	23	Rue Saint-Charles – Mirabel, Centre-Ville Sainte-Thérèse	
Thérèse-De Blainville	Mirabel - Blainville boundary	97.75	60.74	25	Boulevard de la Seigneurie – Blainville	
Thérèse-De Blainville	Mirabel - Blainville boundary	101.20	62.88	28	Boulevard Michèle-Bohec / Chemin Notre-Dame – Mirabel, Blainville	
Mirabel		103.31	64.19	31	Rue Charles / Montée Sainte-Marianne	
Mirabel		107.42	66.75	35	A-50 to R-117 (Boulevard Mirabel) – Gatineau, Lachute, Aéroport Mirabel, Saint-Jerome	Exit 292 on A-50
Mirabel		111.58	69.33	39	R-158 / Route-Sir-Wilfrid-Laurier – Sainte-Sophie	
La Rivière-du-Nord	Saint-Jérôme	113.54	70.55	41	Boulevard du Grand-Héron	
La Rivière-du-Nord	Saint-Jérôme	115.67	71.87	43	Rue De Martigny Ouest – Centre-Ville Saint-Jérôme, Saint-Colomban, Mille-Isles	Signed as exits 43E (east) and 43O (west)
La Rivière-du-Nord	Saint-Jérôme	117.50	73.01	45	R-117 / R-333 / Boulevard de La Salette – Prévost, Saint-Hippolyte	Signed as A-915; No direct southbound access to R-117 and R-333
La Rivière-du-Nord	Saint-Jérôme	123.91	76.99	La Porte-du-Nord Service Centre (Accessible in both directions); entrances signed as "Exit 51"		
Les Pays-d'en-Haut	Prévost	126.95	78.88	55	Prévost	Northbound exit and southbound entrance
Les Pays-d'en-Haut	Sainte-Anne-des-Lacs	129.22	80.29	57	R-117 – Sainte-Anne-des-Lacs	No southbound exit
Les Pays-d'en-Haut	Piedmont	130.53	81.11	58	Chemin Avila – Piedmont	No southbound exit or northbound entrance
Les Pays-d'en-Haut	Saint-Sauveur	133.09	82.70	60	R-364 – Saint-Sauveur, Morin-Heights, Piedmont, Saint-Adolphe-d'Howard	
Les Pays-d'en-Haut	Sainte-Adèle	136.67	84.92	64	Chemin du Mont-Gabriel	
Les Pays-d'en-Haut	Sainte-Adèle	139.4	86.6	67	R-117 – Centre-Ville Sainte-Adèle	Northbound exit and southbound entrance
Les Pays-d'en-Haut	Sainte-Adèle	141.61	87.99	69	R-370 (Chemin Pierre-Péladeau) – Sainte-Adèle, Sainte-Marguerite-du-Lac-Masson, Estérel	
Les Pays-d'en-Haut	Sainte-Adèle	144.45	89.76	72	Chemin du Mont-Sauvage / Montée à Séraphin – Sainte-Adèle	Northbound exit and southbound entrance
Les Laurentides	Val-Morin	148.12	92.04	76	R-117 – Val-Morin, Val-David	Northbound exit and southbound entrance
Les Laurentides	Val-David	152.27	94.62	80	Val-David, 7^{e} Rang	Northbound exit and southbound entrance
Les Laurentides	Sainte-Agathe-des-Monts	155.65	96.72	83	R-329 south / Montée Alouette – Saint-Adolphe-d'Howard	Northbound exit and southbound entrance
Les Laurentides	Sainte-Agathe-des-Monts	158.55	98.52	86	R-117 – Centre-Ville Sainte-Agathe-des-Monts	
Les Laurentides	Sainte-Agathe-des-Monts	160.17	99.53	88	Rue Demontigny	Northbound exit and southbound entrance
Les Laurentides	Sainte-Agathe-des-Monts	161.93– 162.98	100.62– 101.27	89	R-117 south (Boulevard Morin) / R-329 – Saint-Donat	
Les Laurentides	Sainte-Agathe-des-Monts	161.93– 162.98	100.62– 101.27	–	R-117 (TCH) north (Route Transcanadienne) – Mont-Tremblant	A-15 northern terminus; roadway, exit numbers and Trans-Canada Highway follows R-117 north
1.000 mi = 1.609 km; 1.000 km = 0.621 mi: Concurrency terminus; Incomplete access; Route transition

== Rest Areas ==
Location	Name	km	Direction	Services
Jardins-de-Napierville	Jardins-de-Napierville Rest Stop		Northbound	24 hours rest area with parking and rest rooms
La Porte-du-Nord	La Porte-du-Nord Service Centre		bi-directional	24 hours Full Service Centre with McDonald's, Tim Horton's, Saint Hubert, Esso service station (with Couche Tard); tourist information centre.

== Disasters ==
On February 19, 2020, white-out conditions caused a pile-up involving more than 200 vehicles in La Prairie, a suburb of Montreal. Two people died and more than 70 were injured.

On June 18, 2000, the southern portion of the Boulevard du Souvenir overpass in Laval (which crosses over Quebec Autoroute 15), under reconstruction, collapsed into the roadway, killing one and injuring two when cars were crushed underneath the structure. Sixteen beams weighing about 70 tonnes (69 long tons; 77 short tons) each fell. The contractor was faulted for shoddy work. The arched concrete beams were unsecured and tipped over like dominoes, many of them breaking into pieces.

The expressway has also seen flooding. On July 14, 1987, a sudden torrential downpour caused by an HP supercell thunderstorm dumped over 100 millimetres (3.9 inches) of rain in just over one hour across the city. The Décarie Expressway, which is below-grade, was heavily flooded and became a river. At some locations, the water reached a maximum of 3.6 metres (12 feet) in depth on the roadway. Over 300 vehicles were abandoned when they were submerged. Two people were killed by the storm. One 80-year-old man on the Expressway drowned and another one was killed by electrical wires (electrocuted). On July 5, 2005, another torrential downpour flooded portions of the Expressway after several manhole covers blew open from the storm sewers below them being overloaded.

== See also ==
- Décarie Boulevard
- Gibeau Orange Julep

== Notes ==
Trans-Canada Highway
Previous route Route 117	Autoroute 15	Next route Autoroute 40
