= Quebec Route 217 =

Highway in Quebec, Canada

Route 217

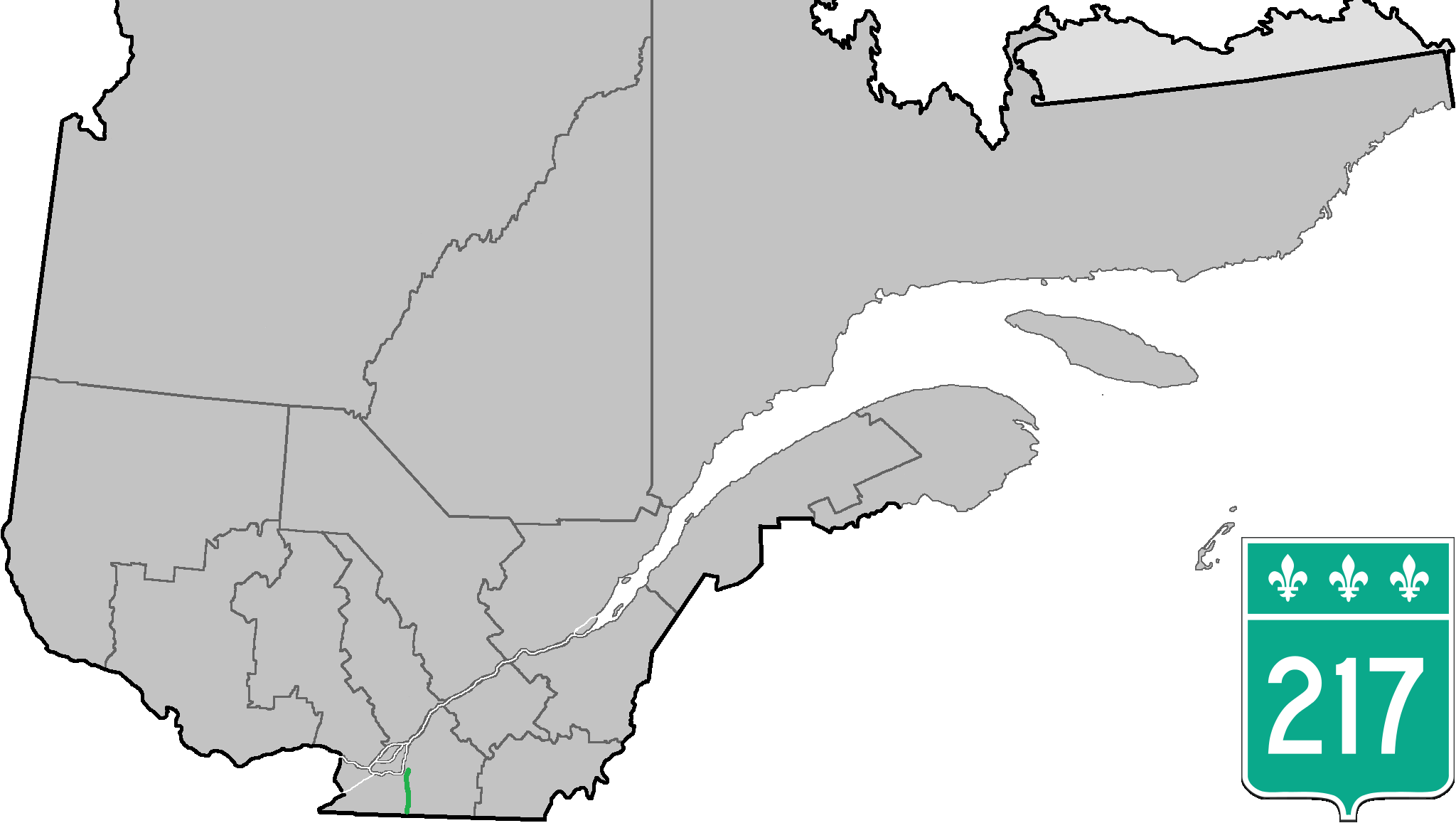

Route information
- Maintained by Transports Québec
- Length: 45.8 km (28.5 mi)

Major junctions
- South end: Montée Guay at Saint-Bernard-de-Lacolle
- R-202 in Saint-Bernard-de-Lacolle; R-219 / R-221 in Saint-Cyprien-de-Napierville; A-30 in La Prairie
- North end: R-104 in La Prairie

Location
- Country: Canada
- Province: Quebec

Highway system
- Quebec provincial highways; Autoroutes; List; Former
← R-216	→ R-218

Route 217 is a provincial highway located in the Montérégie region of Quebec south of Montreal. It runs from Montée Guay in Saint-Bernard-de-Lacolle and ends in La Prairie at the junctions of Route 104 and Autoroute 30. It serves in part as a service route for Autoroute 15 until Saint-Philippe and, where it runs along the Saint-Jacques River, and serves as a service route for Autoroute 30 until La Prairie and its northeastern terminus at Route 104.

Route 217 previously extended south from Montée Guay to the Canada–US border, connecting with Meridian Road at Champlain, New York. However, this port of entry closed around 1950, with the Canada border station later dismantled and the US border station converted into offices for the United States Department of Agriculture. This 1.2 km (1 mi) segment remained part of Route 217 (and its pre-1970s predecessor, Route 9A) as recent as 2005, but in recent years has been truncated at Montée Guay.

== Municipalities along Route 217 ==
- Saint-Bernard-de-Lacolle
- Saint-Cyprien-de-Napierville
- Saint-Jacques-le-Mineur
- Saint-Philippe
- La Prairie

== Major intersections ==
RCM	Location	km	mi	Destinations	Notes
Les Jardins-de-Napierville	Saint-Bernard-de-Lacolle	0	0.0	Montée Guay to A-15 / R-221	Southern terminus
Les Jardins-de-Napierville	Saint-Bernard-de-Lacolle	5.4	3.4	R-202 – Hemmingford, Lacolle	
Les Jardins-de-Napierville	Saint-Cyprien-de-Napierville	20.1	12.5	R-219 / R-221 – Saint-Patrice-de-Sherrington, Napierville	
Roussillon	La Prairie	45.7	28.4	A-30 east – Brossard	Exit 62 (A-30)
Roussillon	La Prairie	45.8	28.5	R-104 to A-30 west / R-134 – Brossard	Northern terminus
1.000 mi = 1.609 km; 1.000 km = 0.621 mi

== See also ==
- List of Quebec provincial highways
