= Hemmingford, Quebec =

Hemmingford, Quebec may refer to:

- Hemmingford, Quebec (township), a township municipality
- Hemmingford, Quebec (village), a village municipality enclaved in the township
