= Saint-Jean County, Quebec =

Coordinates: 45°11′N 73°18′W

Saint-Jean County is an historical county in Quebec on the west bank of the Richelieu River, about 40 km southeast of Montreal. The county was organized in 1854 from the counties of Huntingdon and Chambly. Its extent included the parishes of L'Acadie, Lacolle, St. Luc, St. Valentin, and St. Jean, as well as the city and county seat of Saint-Jean-sur-Richelieu. In the early 1980s, when Quebec abolished its counties, most of Saint-Jean County was transferred to Le Haut-Richelieu Regional County Municipality, and the southwestern corner was transferred to Les Jardins-de-Napierville Regional County Municipality.
