= Huntingdon County, Quebec =

Historical county in Quebec, Canada

Huntingdon County is an historical county in southwestern Quebec, Canada. It is named after the town and county of the same name (Huntingdon, Huntingdonshire) in east central England. It is situated in the Montreal South Shore region of Montérégie, one of the roughly 12 regions of Quebec. The county was bounded entirely on its south by the Canada–US border (45° N for 88.75 km from 73°32′ W to 74°40′ W), along its northwestern flank by Lake St-Francis (Lac St-François) of the Saint Lawrence River to its most northern point on the river at 45°13′ N and 74°13′ W, to the east by Saint-Jean County, with its easternmost point at 45°5.5' N and 73°31′ W (this point forms the junction of the borders of Châteauguay County, Napierville County and Saint-Jean County) and to the north from east to west by Napierville County, Châteauguay County, and Beauharnois County. On the other side of the Saint Lawrence River is Soulanges County, Quebec, the Township of Lancaster and the Township of Charlottenburgh in Glengarry County, Ontario, and the Township of Cornwall in Stormont County, Ontario.

Huntingdon County is the only county in the St Lawrence Valley to be entirely and totally divided into townships, of which there are 7. All these townships run in a straight line and have the Canada–US border as a common southern border. From east to west they are the Township of Hemmingford, the Township of Havelock, the Franklin Township, the Township of Hinchinbrooke, the Township of Elgin, the Township of Godmanchester, and the Township of Dundee. The county seat, Huntingdon, located at 45°5′ N and 74°10′ W, straddles the border between Hinchinbrooke and Godmanchester. Except for Godmanchester, all the other townships have a community that takes the name of the township in which it is situated (Hemmingford, Havelock, Franklin, Hinchinbrooke, Elgin, Dundee).

A notable feature of Huntingdon County is the presence of the Saint Regis Akwesasne Mohawk Reserve at the westernmost point of the county in the Township of Dundee. That area of the Saint Lawrence, like many along its length, contains many small islands. The Reserve straddles the meeting point of the Quebec-Ontario-New York State borders at that point. The American side of the Reserve is Franklin County, New York.

On 1 January 1982, the county was officially dissolved. Most of the County became part of the MRC de Le Haut-Saint-Laurent except for a small section in the far east (The Township of Hemmingford and the Village of Hemmingford) which became part of MRC de Les Jardins-de-Napierville.
