= Décarie Interchange =

- Échangeur Décarie (French)
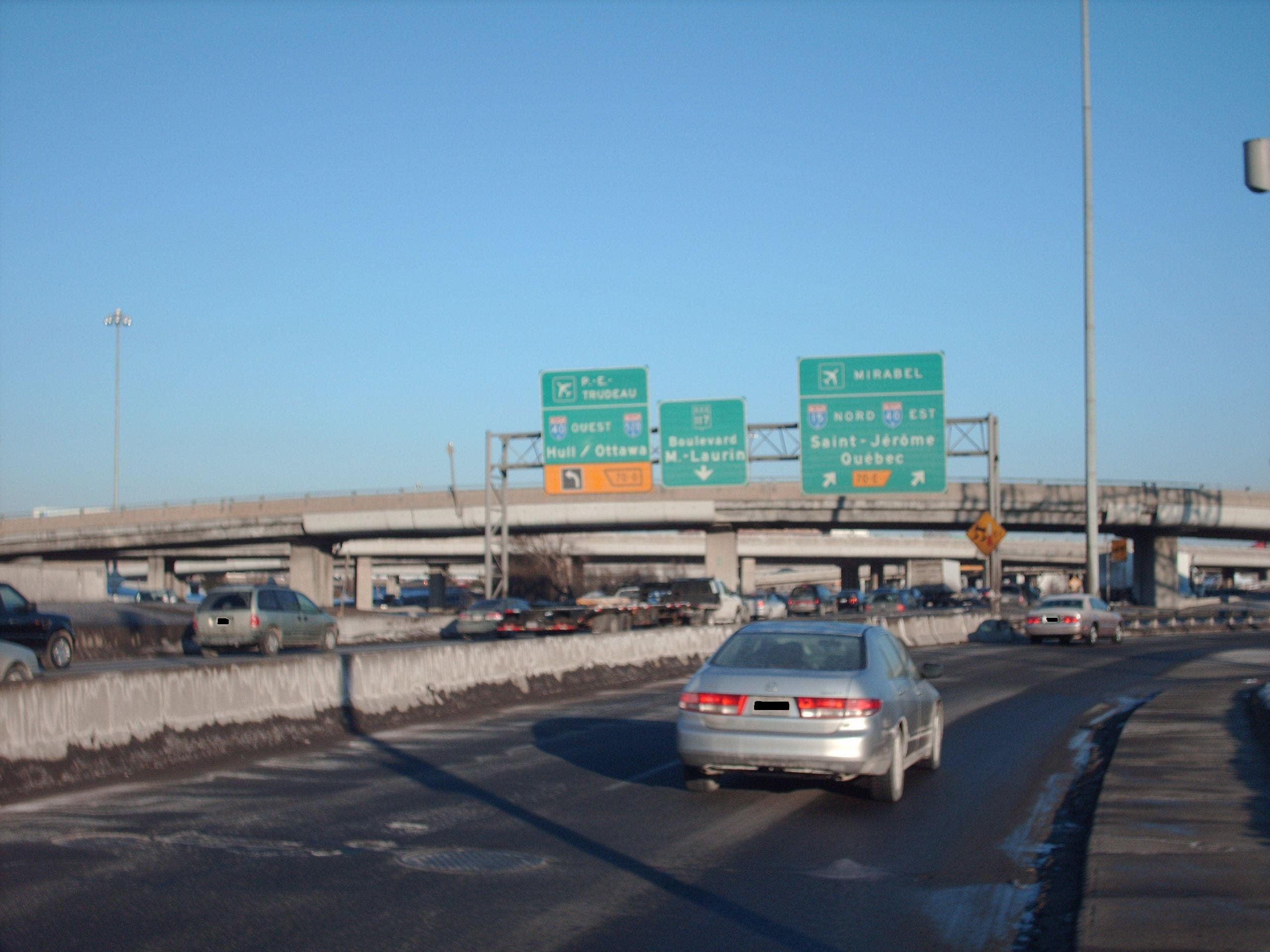
- Décarie Interchange looking north from A-15.

Location
- Montreal, Quebec, Canada
- Coordinates: 45°30′13.0″N 73°39′59.0″W
- Roads at junction: A-40 (TCH) (Autoroute Métropolitaine); A-15 (Autoroute Décarie); R-117 (Boulevard Marcel-Laurin); Boulevard Décarie

Construction
- Type: Turbine-stack hybrid
- Constructed: 1960-1964
- Maintained by: Transports Québec

The Décarie Interchange, sometimes known as Décarie Circle in English-language radio traffic reports, is a freeway interchange located on the island of Montreal, Quebec, Canada.

== Geography ==
It is one of the busiest interchanges in Montreal as it connects Autoroute 40 (Metropolitan Boulevard; also Trans-Canada Highway) with Autoroute 15 south (Décarie Autoroute) and also provides access to Boulevard Marcel-Laurin (Route 117) and Décarie Boulevard in the borough of Saint-Laurent. Slightly to the west of the interchange is another interchange, which is the eastern terminus of Autoroute 520 (Côte-de-Liesse Expressway); it merges into Autoroute 40 with a traffic circle and is sometimes considered part of the extended Décarie Interchange region. It marks the western terminus of the Metropolitan Boulevard elevated expressway, which falls to ground level to the west.

== History ==
The Décarie Interchange was constructed from 1960 to 1964 along the Metropolitan Expressway (A-40), which was opened in 1960, in conjunction with the construction of the Décarie Expressway (A-15). The interchange opened in time for the Expo 67.

It is named after Décarie Boulevard, which the Décarie Autoroute parallels for most of its course. The boulevard is in turn is named after the Décarie family, a prominent Montreal-area family. Its most notable members include Daniel-Jérémie Décarie (1836-1904), who was mayor of Notre-Dame-de-Grâce from 1877 to 1904, and his son, lawyer Jérémie-Louis Décarie (1870-1927), who was a Quebec parliamentarian.
