= Gibeau Orange Julep =

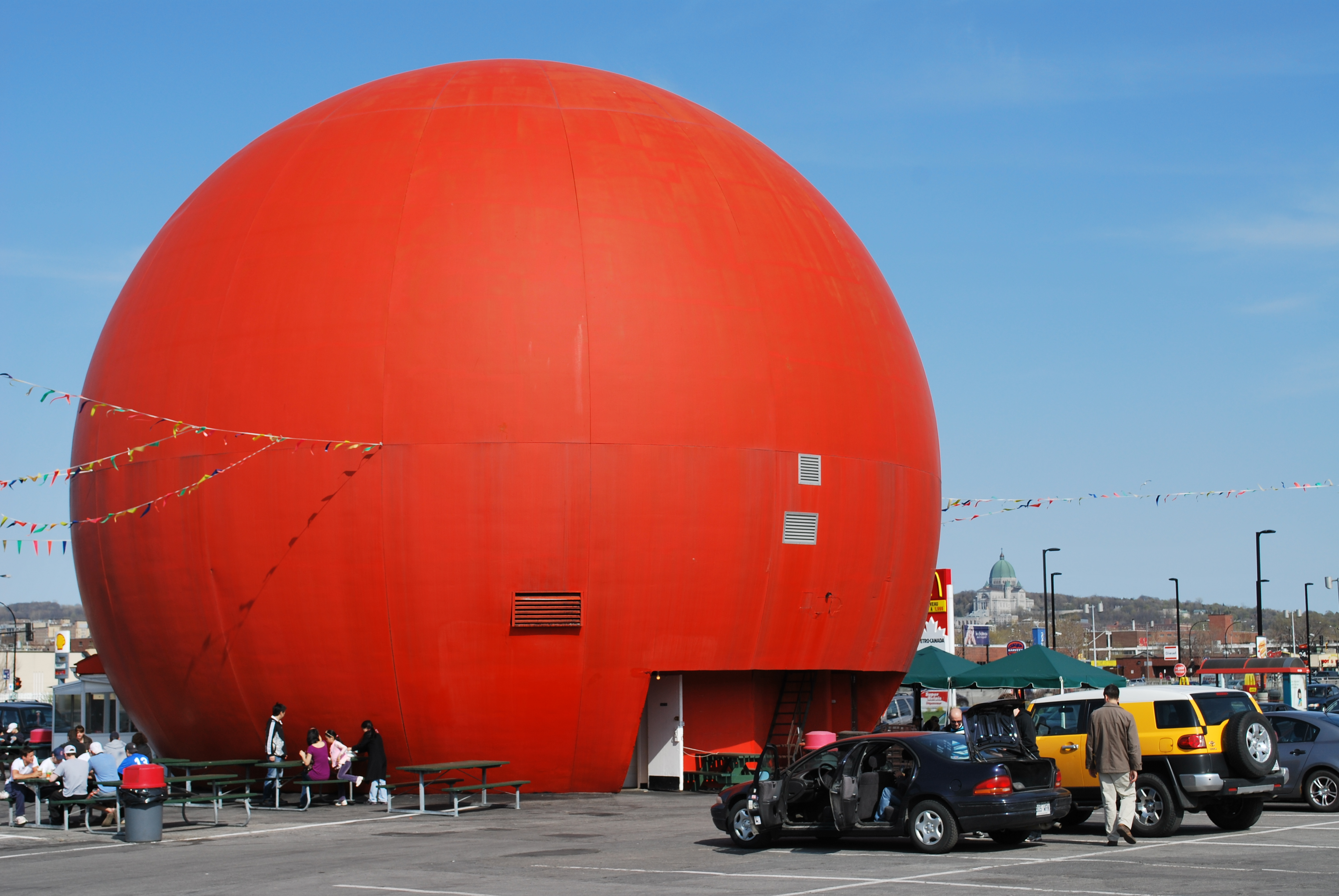
- Gibeau Orange Julep storefront

- Location on map of Montreal Gibeau Orange Julep (Quebec) Gibeau Orange Julep (Canada)

Restaurant information
- Established: 1932
- Food type: Restaurant specializing in "Orange Julep"
- Location: 7700 Décarie Boulevard, Montreal, Quebec, H4P 2H4, Canada
- Coordinates: 45.4957°N 73.6568°W

The Gibeau Orange Julep restaurant (also known colloquially as OJ or The Big Orange or The Julep or The Orange Julep) is a roadside attraction and fast food restaurant in Montreal, Quebec, Canada. The building resembles an orange, stands three stories high, and has a diameter of 12.3 metres (40 ft).

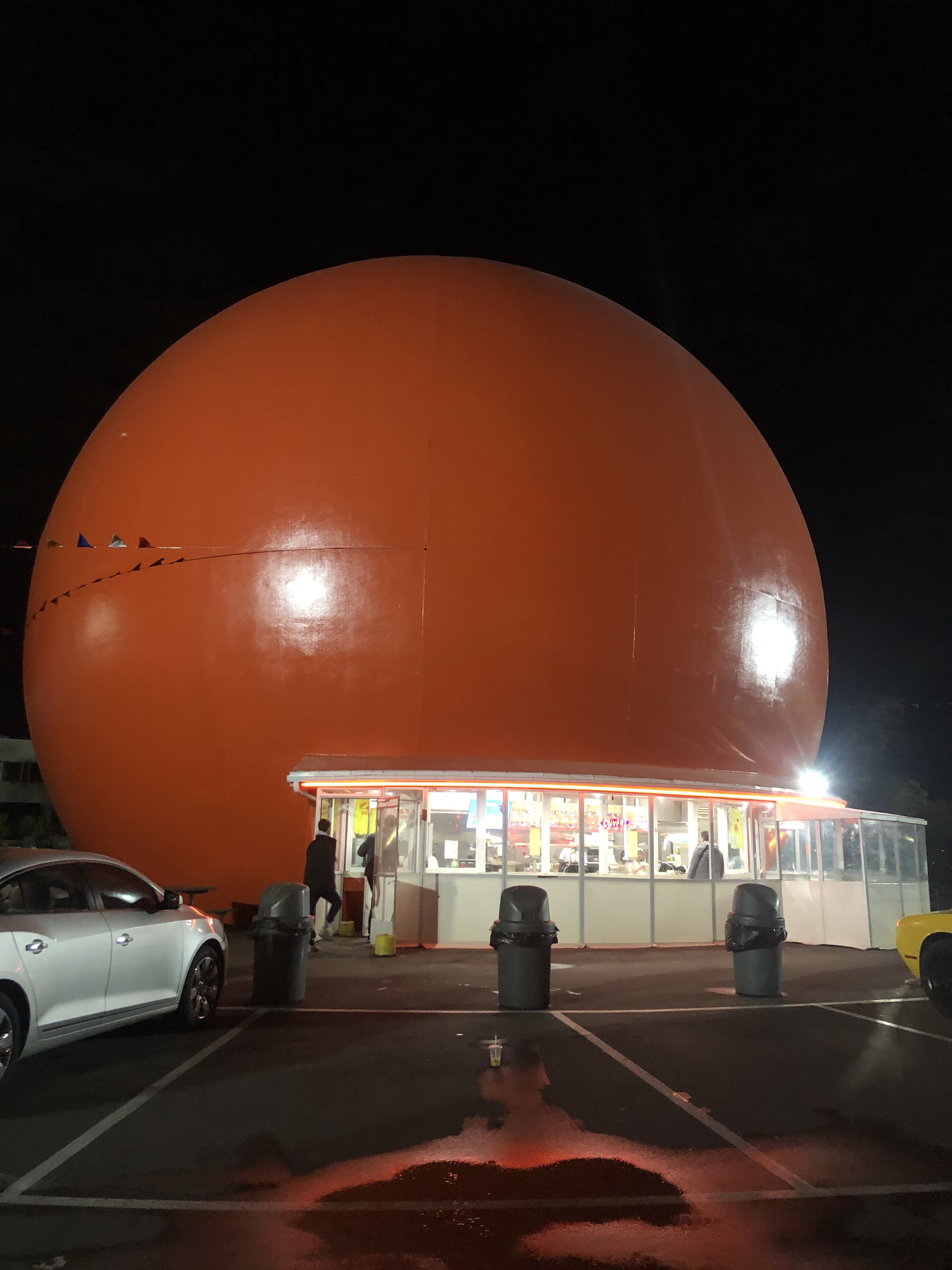
Nighttime at the Big Orange (2019)

== History ==
The restaurant was founded by Hermas Gibeau in 1932 to serve his trademark drink the Gibeau Orange Julep, reportedly based on a Gibeau family recipe. Before founding the first location, Gibeau sold his drinks at Belmont Park, a popular amusement park at the time. The original storefront, located on rue Sherbrooke Est, was not shaped like an orange. The cult following that developed revolved around his second location, the Big Orange, located on Décarie Blvd.

For a brief time, the Julep was noted for roller skating waitresses, who brought food orders to cars. Customers today order and receive their food at the counter. Food can then be taken away or eaten at picnic tables nearby. The restaurant opens at 8 am and operates until 3 am on Fridays and Saturdays, and until 2 am the rest of the week.

An August 9, 2019 article by the Montreal Gazette cited an earlier (August 9, 1977) article on the restaurant: “At Gibeau’s Julep, the 1950s never really left. It’s a scene that has outlasted LSD, the Vietnam war and thus far pollution,” Juan Rodriguez reported, in an Aug. 9, 1977 feature on the Décarie Blvd. landmark.” Rodriguez, the original author, emphasized the importance of the restaurant as a social hub, separate from its food or drink.

=== Structure ===
In 1945, Gibeau built an orange concrete sphere two stories high to house his restaurant. It is believed Gibeau intended to live there with his wife and children. The Big Orange, the last standing operating Orange Julep, was once one of several Gibeau Orange Julep restaurants in the Montreal area and beyond, many shaped like a giant orange.

A 1969 Montreal Gazette article by Peter Lanken reported: “The original Orange Julep was conceived, in 1945… It was on Décarie Boulevard, it was round, it was concrete, and it was orange. It had a small square window on the second floor, which made it look like something out of a children’s book...” Though Lanken refers to The Big Orange as the original restaurant, it was in fact the second location, though the first orange-shaped one. The restaurant and its orange sphere were rebuilt, from a design by architect Olius P. Bois, to be larger and further back from the roadway when it was widened to become the Décarie Expressway in 1966. Its shell consists of fiberglass segments that were ordered from a local pool manufacturer, covering a laminated wood shell frame. The whole building is illuminated from the outside in the evenings.

This style of building is called mimetic architecture, where a building is shaped in such a way that it references the purpose of the building.

== Drink ==
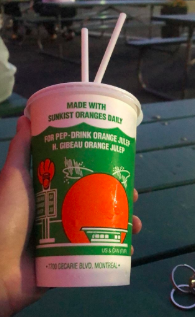
The Gibeau Orange Julep drink

The drink, the Gibeau Orange Julep, was first marketed in 1932. In addition to the storefront, it is also sold retail. Propos Montreal claims to have found the patent for the recipe. However, it was patented by the current owner in 1993. As outlined in the patent, the fruit juice is deacidified by the mixture of skimmed milk powder and pectin before adding the juice concentrate and the natural vanilla flavour.

== Events ==
For decades up until 2019, the Orange Julep hosted classic car "cruise nights" on Wednesday evenings, May to September.

On 31 May 2023, Andreï Petuhov was killed by a sucker punch in the Orange Julep's parking lot following a driving incident. Two people, Ismail Karaoui and Nedjem Eddine Khirat, were found guilty of manslaughter over said killing.

== In the media ==
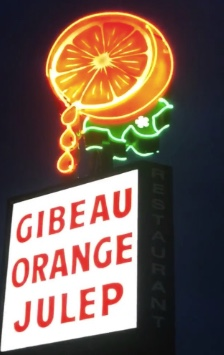
The Orange Julep Sign (2019)

The restaurant appears, along with other Montreal landmarks, in the music video for the Men Without Hats song "Where Do the Boys Go?".

== See also ==
- Orange Julius, a US chain that sells a similar beverage.
