= Champlain–St. Bernard de Lacolle Border Crossing =

Canada–United States border crossing

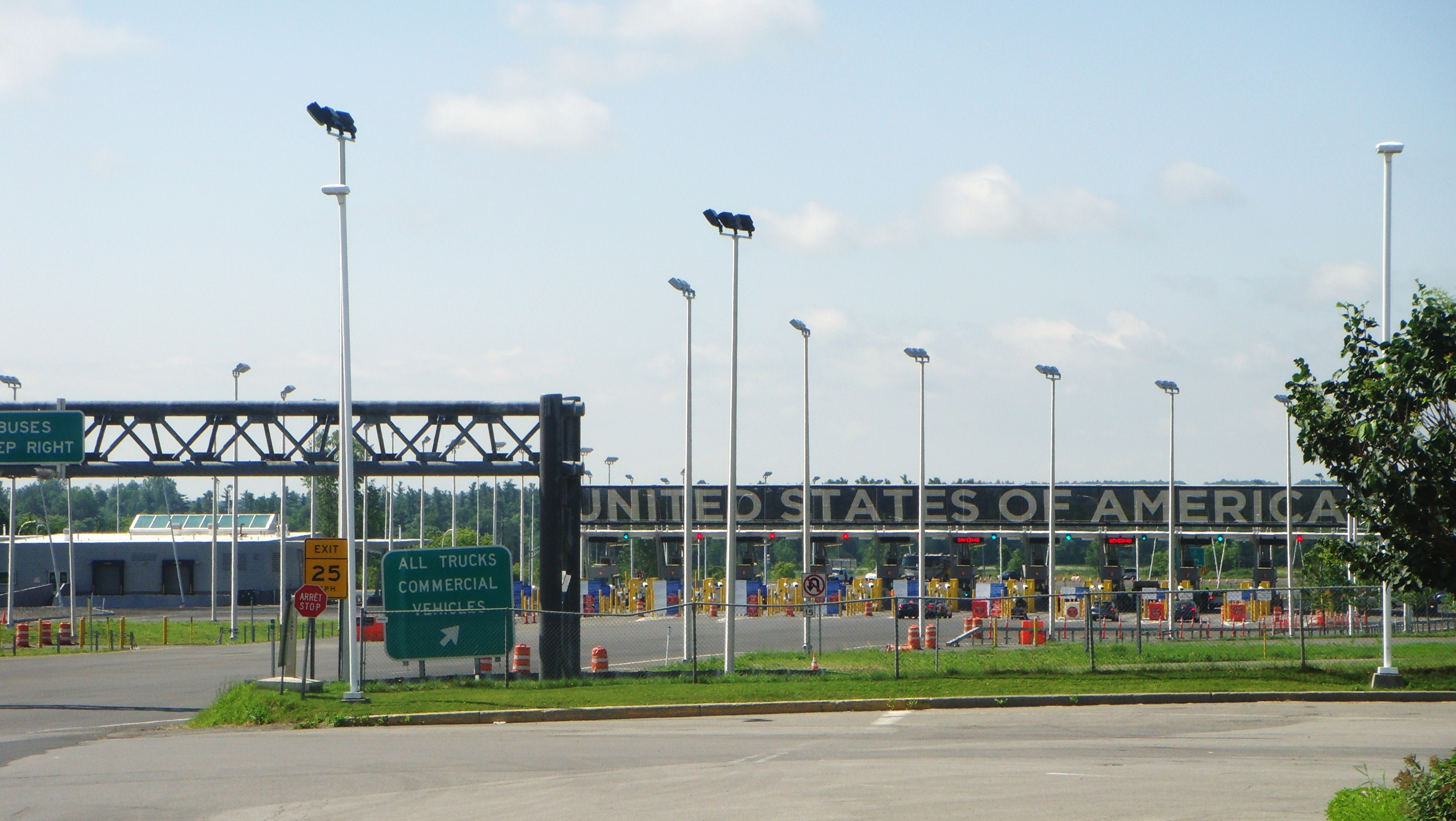
- Champlain, NY Border Inspection Station (View from the Canadian side of the border)

Locaiton
- Country: United States; Canada
- Location: I-87 / A-15; US Port: 237 West Service Road Champlain, NY 12919; Canadian Port: Autoroute 15, Saint-Bernard-de-Lacolle, Quebec J0J 1J0
- Coordinates: 45.008825°N 73.452358°W

Details
- Opened: 1967

Website
- Official Canadian website Official US website

The Champlain–St. Bernard de Lacolle Border Crossing, sometimes known colloquially as "Blackpool" crossing, connects Champlain, New York, and Saint-Bernard-de-Lacolle, Quebec, on the United States–Canada border. It is the terminus of Interstate 87 in the US and Quebec Autoroute 15 in Canada. The route is the primary corridor between Montreal, which is less than 30 mi (48 km) from the border, and New York City. The crossing is among the busiest in the US; more than two million travelers use it annually, including more than half a million during July and August, and is the second-busiest USA-Canada border crossing that is not located at a bridge. This crossing is open 24 hours per day, 365 days per year.

A previous crossing on U.S. Route 9 had its own terminus on Meridian Road, also in Champlain.

== See also ==
- List of Canada–United States border crossings
