= Quebec Route 219 =

Highway in Quebec, Canada

Route 219

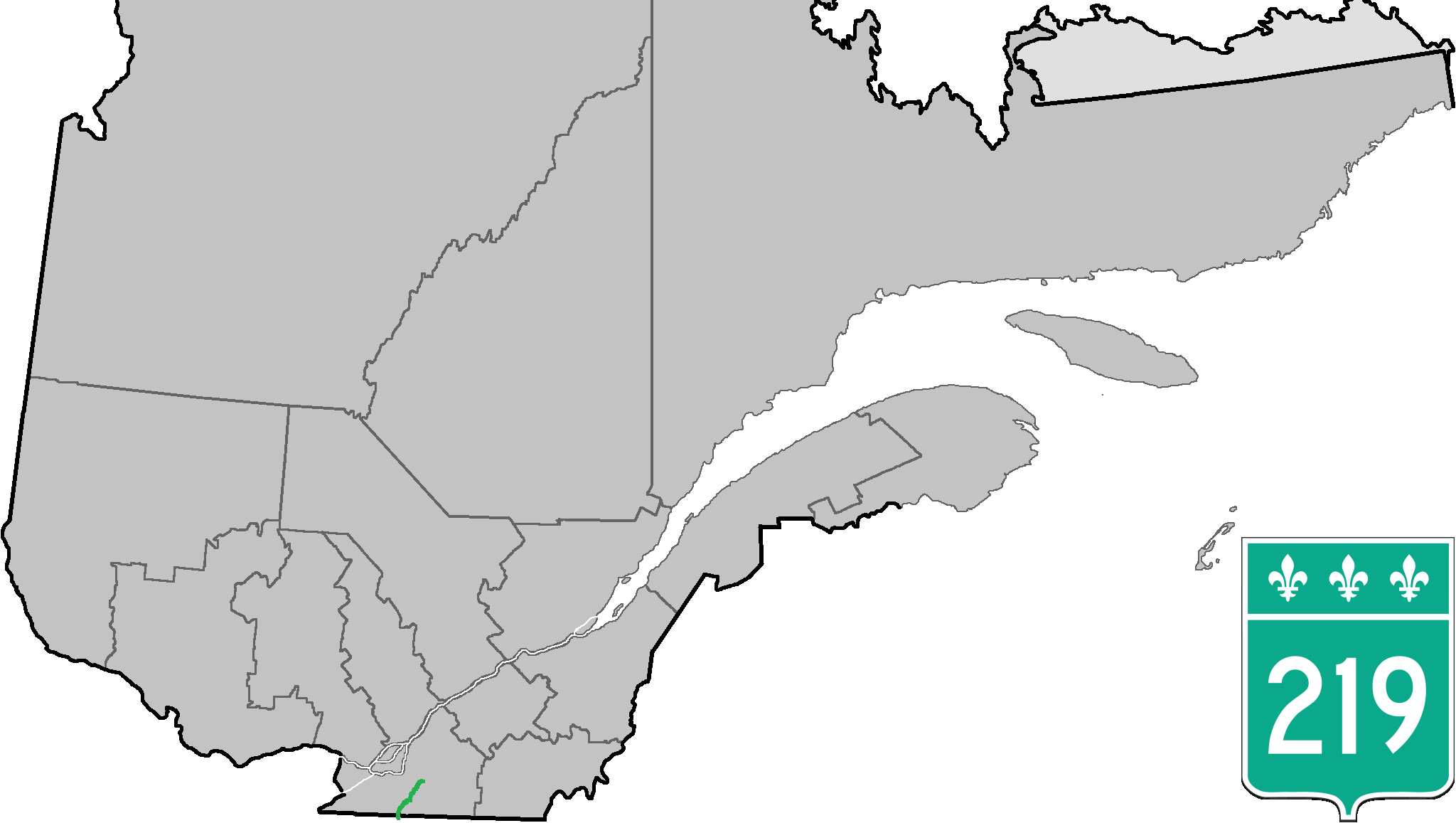

Route information
- Maintained by Transports Québec
- Length: 55.0 km (34.2 mi)

Major junctions
- South end: CR 34 at the U.S. border in Hemmingford Township
- R-202 in Hemmingford Village; R-205 in Hemmingford Township; R-221 in Saint-Patrice-de-Sherrington; A-15 / R-217 / R-221 in Saint-Cyprien-de-Napierville
- North end: A-35 / R-104 in Saint-Jean-sur-Richelieu

Location
- Country: Canada
- Province: Quebec

Highway system
- Quebec provincial highways; Autoroutes; List; Former
← R-218	→ R-220

Route 219 is a provincial highway located in the Montérégie region of Quebec south of Montreal. It starts at the Mooers-Hemmingford Border Crossing south of Hemmingford and ends in Saint-Jean-sur-Richelieu.

The highway starts at the border continuing from the former north terminus of NY 22 south of Hemmingford and north of Mooers, New York, from there it goes North through the Village and Township of Hemmingford toward Saint-Patrice-de-Sherrington. There it turns east for a 9 km concurrency with Route 221 until Napierville, where again it goes north alongside the L'Acadie River until reaching the former municipality of L'Acadie, where it turns eastward toward its terminus at a junction with Autoroute 35 in Saint-Jean-sur-Richelieu.

== Municipalities along Route 219 ==
- Hemmingford Township
- Hemmingford Village
- Saint-Patrice-de-Sherrington
- Saint-Cyprien-de-Napierville
- Napierville
- Saint-Jean-sur-Richelieu
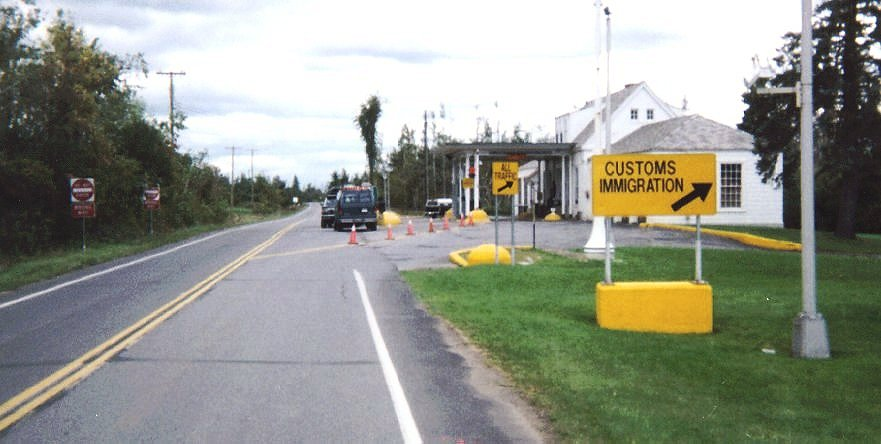
Mooers border station, southern terminus of Route 219.

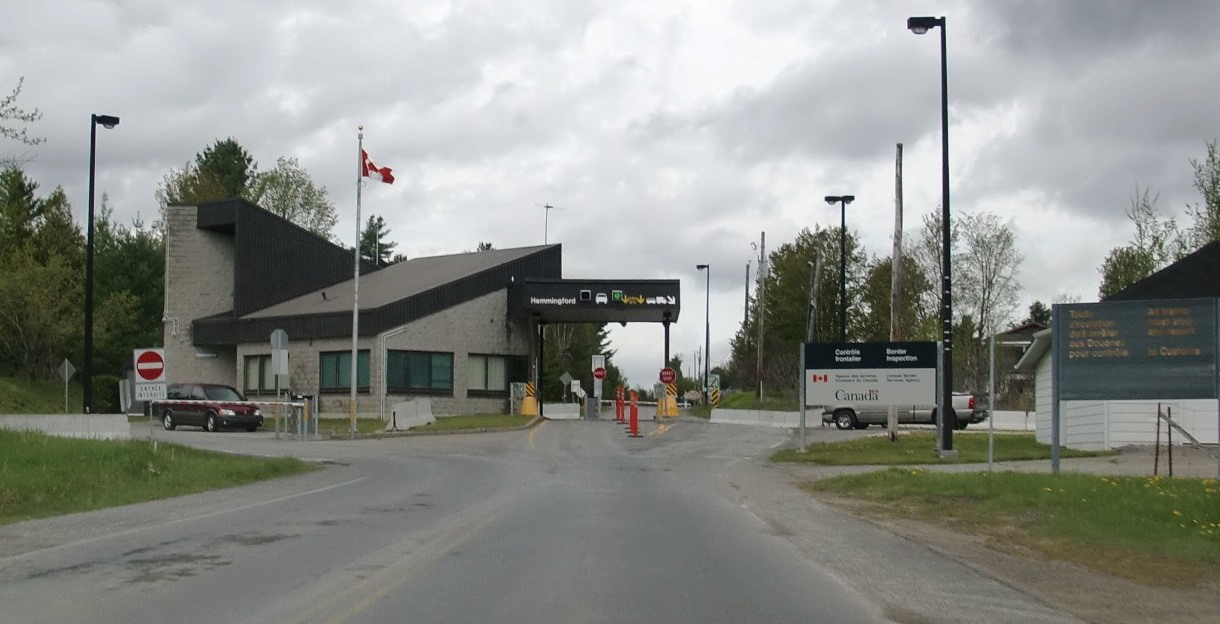
Route 219 begins at Hemmingford border crossing.

== Major intersections ==
RCM	Location	km	mi	Destinations	Notes
Les Jardins-de-Napierville	Hemmingford	0	0.0	CR 34 to NY 22 – Moores	Southern terminus
Les Jardins-de-Napierville	Hemmingford			R-202 – Huntingdon, Lacolle	
Les Jardins-de-Napierville	Hemmingford			R-205 north – Sainte-Clotilde	Southern terminus of Route 205
Les Jardins-de-Napierville	Saint-Patrice-de-Sherrington			R-221 north – Saint-Rémi	Begin/end concurrency with Route 221
Les Jardins-de-Napierville	Saint-Cyprien-de-Napierville			A-15 – Montreal	Exit 21 (A-15)
Les Jardins-de-Napierville	Saint-Cyprien-de-Napierville			R-217 (Rang Saint-André) – Saint-Jacques-le-Mineur	
Les Jardins-de-Napierville	Napierville			R-221 south (Rue Saint-Jacques) – Saint-Rémi	Begin/end concurrency with Route 221
Le Haut-Richelieu	Saint-Jean-sur-Richelieu	55	34	A-35 / R-104 – Chambly, Montreal,	Exit 45 (A-35 / QC 104); northern terminus
1.000 mi = 1.609 km; 1.000 km = 0.621 mi

== See also ==
- List of Quebec provincial highways
