= Quebec Route 221 =

Highway in Quebec, Canada

Route 221

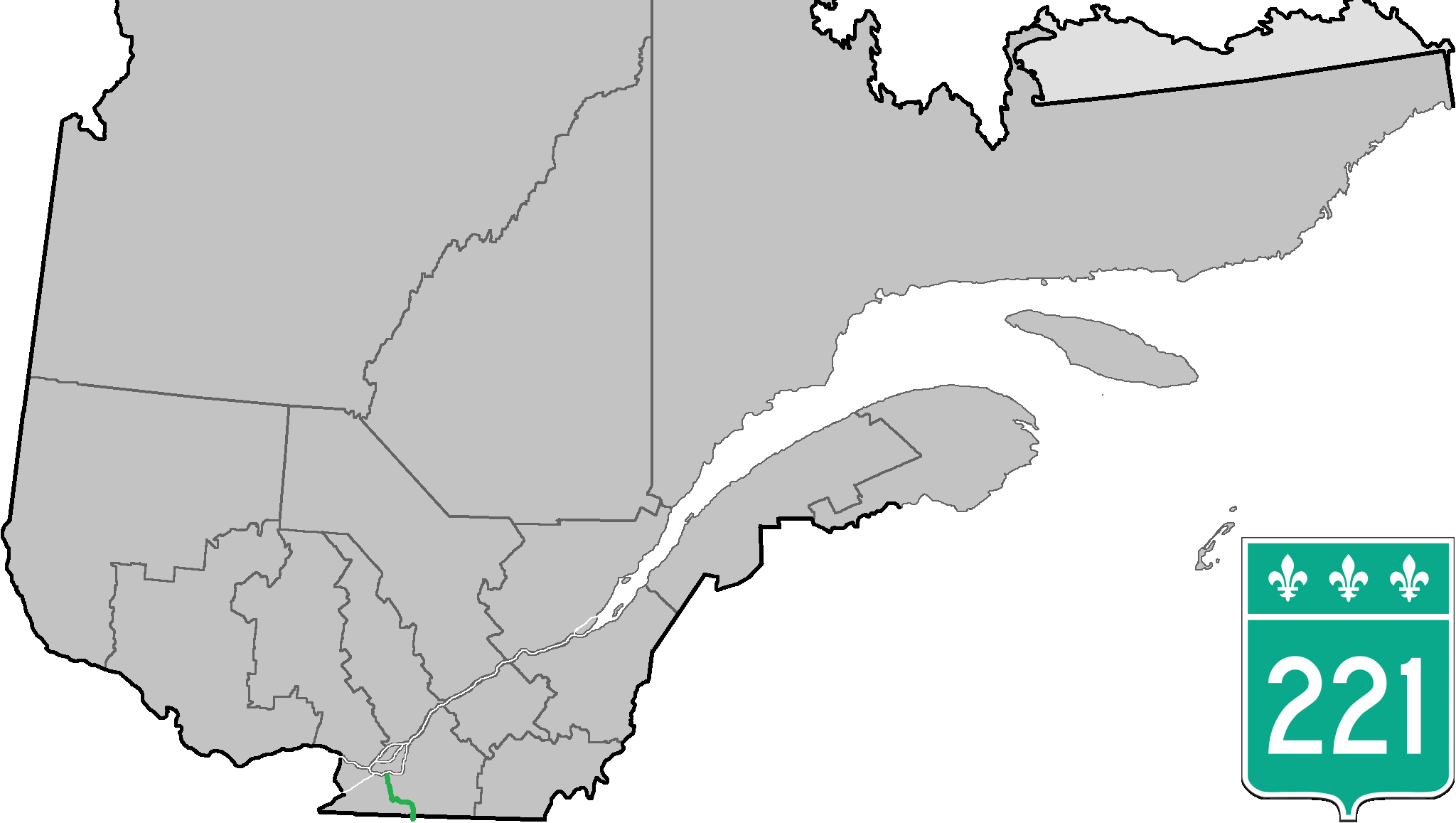

Route information
- Maintained by Transports Québec
- Length: 64.3 km (40.0 mi)

Major junctions
- South end: NY 276 at the U.S. border near Champlain, NY
- R-202 in Lacolle; R-219 in Napierville; A-15 / R-217 / R-219 in Saint-Cyprien de Napierville; R-219 in Saint-Patrice-de-Sherrington; R-209 in Saint-Rémi
- North end: R-207 in Saint-Isidore

Location
- Country: Canada
- Province: Quebec

Highway system
- Quebec provincial highways; Autoroutes; List; Former
← R-220	→ R-222

Route 221 is a north–south highway in Quebec on the south shore of the St. Lawrence River, linking the US border south of Lacolle to Saint-Isidore.

The highway begins at the US border at the Overton Corners–Lacolle 221 Border Crossing, where it connects to New York State Route 276 (NY 276), and goes north, briefly running concurrently with Route 202 before reaching the urban area of Lacolle. It then continues north until Napierville where it goes west concurrently with Route 219 until they separate at Saint-Patrice-de-Sherrington, where Route 221 goes north toward Saint-Édouard. There it briefly goes roughly west via Saint-Michel and Saint-Rémi before turning northeast toward its terminus at Route 207 in the northern part of Saint-Isidore, just south of Autoroute 30.

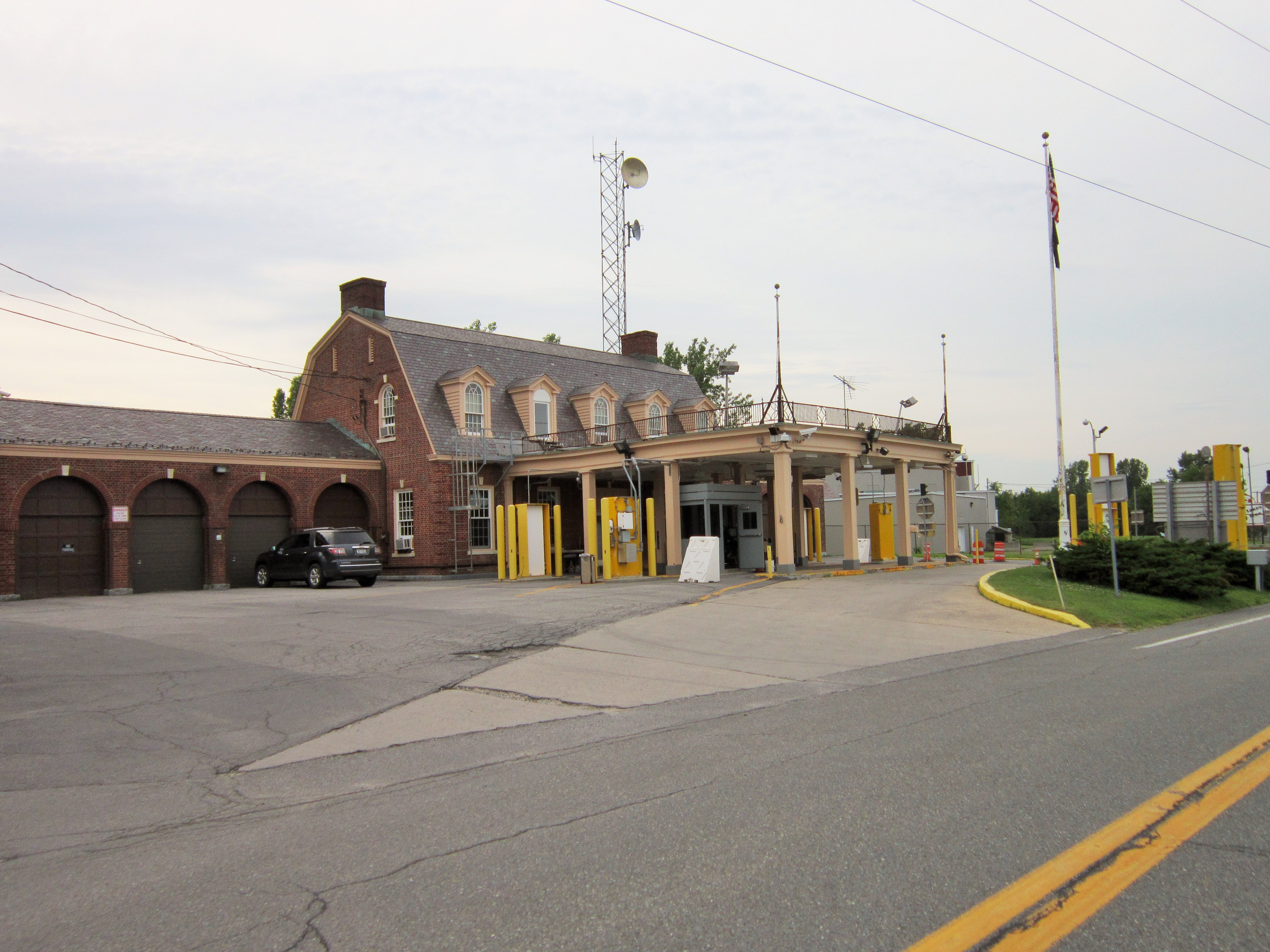
Route 221 north begins past Overton Corners border station at US border

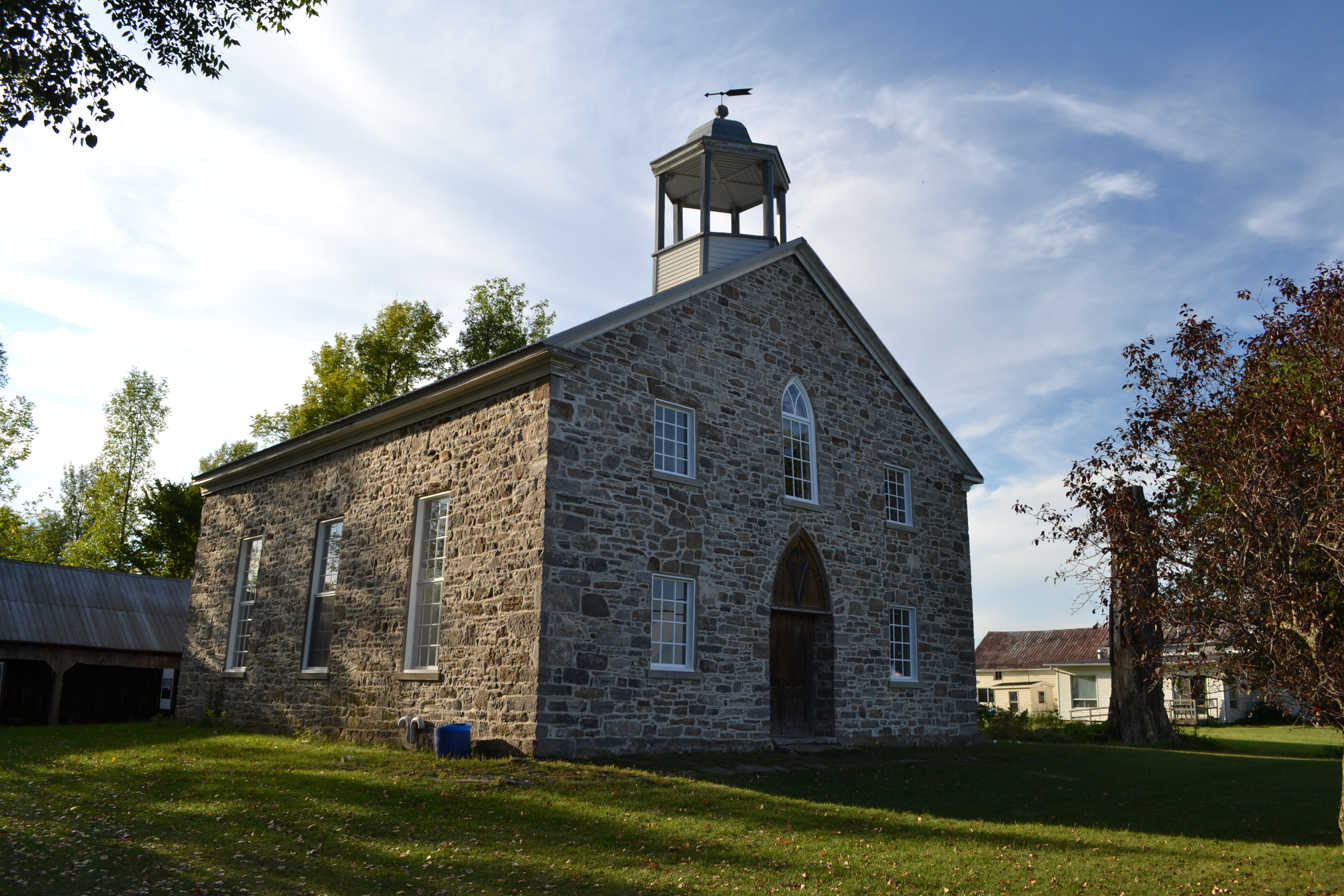
Route 221 runs through historic Odelltown locality.
