= Saint-Bernard-de-Lacolle =

- Municipality
- Motto: Florete Flores ("Flowers bloom")
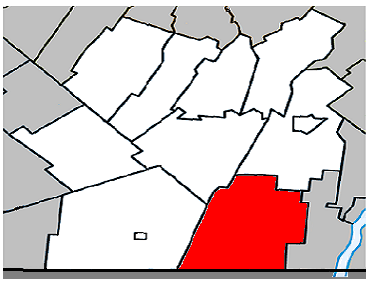
- Location within Les Jardins-de-Napierville RCM

- Location in southern Quebec
- Coordinates: 45°05′N 73°25′W
- Country: Canada
- Province: Quebec
- Region: Montérégie
- RCM: Les Jardins-de-Napierville
- Constituted: July 1, 1855

Government
  - Mayor: Estelle Muzzi
  - Federal riding: Châteauguay—Lacolle
  - Prov. riding: Huntingdon

Area
  - Total: 113.65 km^{2} (43.88 sq mi)
  - Land: 113.36 km^{2} (43.77 sq mi)

Population (2021)
  - Total: 1,542
  - Density: 13.6/km^{2} (35/sq mi)
  - Pop (2016-21): ▼0.5%
  - Dwellings: 674
- Time zone: UTC−5 (EST)
  - Summer (DST): UTC−4 (EDT)
- Postal code(s): J0J 1V0
- Area codes: 450 and 579
- Highways A-15: R-202 R-217
- Website: www.municipalite-de-saint-bernard-de-lacolle.ca

Saint-Bernard-de-Lacolle (French pronunciation: [sɛ̃ bɛʁnaʁ də lakɔl]) is a municipality in Les Jardins-de-Napierville Regional County Municipality, Quebec, Canada, located in the administrative area of Montérégie. Saint-Bernard-de-Lacolle was established as a municipality officially in 1855, and its population as of the 2021 Canadian census was 1,542.

A major border crossing, Blackpool, is located where St-Bernard-de-Lacolle abuts the village of Champlain, New York, at the junction of Quebec Autoroute 15 and U.S. US Interstate 87.

== Demographics ==
=== Population ===
Canada census – Saint-Bernard-de-Lacolle community profile

	2021	2016	2011
Population	1,542 (-0.5% from 2016)	1,549 (+4.9% from 2011)	1,477 (-3.9% from 2006)
Land area	113.36 km^{2} (43.77 sq mi)	113.52 km^{2} (43.83 sq mi)	113.19 km^{2} (43.70 sq mi)
Population density	13.6/km^{2} (35/sq mi)	13.6/km^{2} (35/sq mi)	13.0/km^{2} (34/sq mi)
Median age	44.8 (M: 44.4, F: 44.8)	46.4 (M: 46.6, F: 46.1)	44.2 (M: 44.8, F: 43.3)
Private dwellings	674 (total) 618 (occupied)	670 (total) 620 (occupied)	657 (total)
Median household income	$80,000	$60,288	$43,300

References: 2021 2016 2011

Historical Census Data - Saint-Bernard-de-Lacolle, Quebec

Year	Pop.	±%
1921	1,147	—
1931	1,043	−9.1%
1941	1,241	+19.0%
1951	1,200	−3.3%
1956	1,226	+2.2%
1961	1,326	+8.2%

Year	Pop.	±%
1966	1,377	+3.8%
1971	1,399	+1.6%
1976	1,446	+3.4%
1981	1,500	+3.7%
1986	1,490	−0.7%
1991	1,509	+1.3%

Year	Pop.	±%
1996	1,544	+2.3%
2001	1,499	−2.9%
2006	1,537	+2.5%
2011	1,477	−3.9%
2016	1,549	+4.9%
2021	1,542	−0.5%

Source: Statistics Canada

=== Language ===
Where English is spoken fluently in the region, the municipality recognizes French as an official language for formal and informal use.

Canada Census Mother Tongue - Saint-Bernard-de-Lacolle, Quebec
Census	Total	French			English			French & English			Other		
Year	Responses	Count	Trend	Pop %	Count	Trend	Pop %	Count	Trend	Pop %	Count	Trend	Pop %
2011	1,475	1,220	▼5.8%	82.71%	185	▲76.2%	12.54%	15	▲50.0%	1.02%	55	▼31.3%	3.73%
2006	1,490	1,295	▲8.8%	86.91%	105	▼56.3%	7.05%	10	▲ n/a%	0.67%	80	▲300.0%	5.37%
2001	1,450	1,190	▲2.6%	82.07%	240	▼12.7%	16.55%	0	0.0%	0.00%	20	▼20.0%	1.38%
1996	1,460	1,160	n/a	79.45%	275	n/a	18.84%	0	n/a	0.00%	25	n/a	1.71%

== Education ==
The South Shore Protestant Regional School Board previously served a portion of the municipality.

== See also ==
- List of anglophone communities in Quebec
