= Saint-Jacques-le-Mineur, Quebec =

Saint-Jacques-le-Mineur
- Municipality
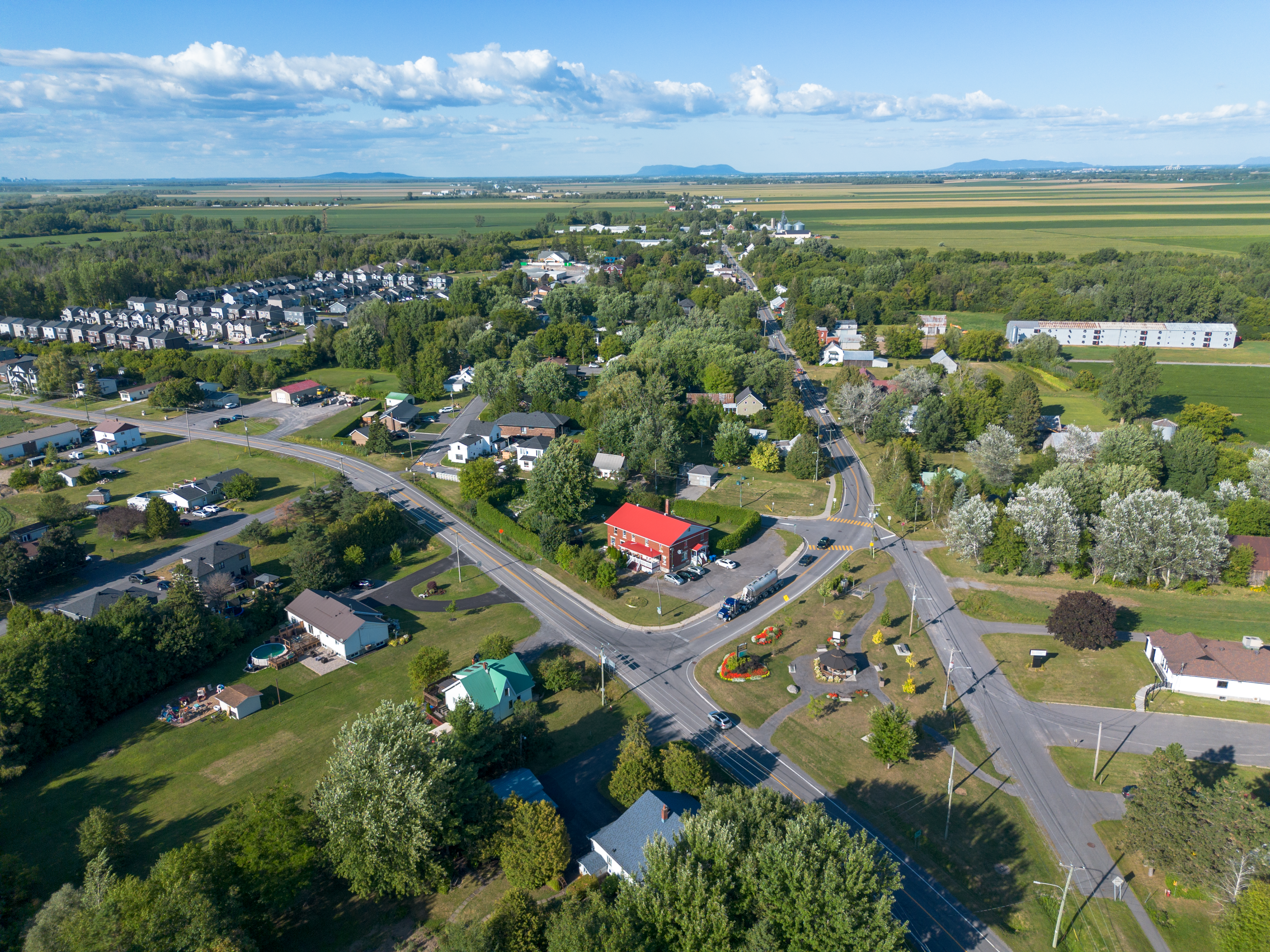
- Saint-Jacques-le-Mineur in 2025

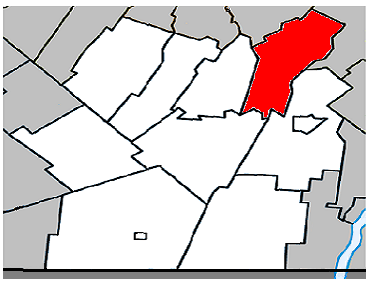
- Location within Les Jardins-de-Napierville RCM

- Location in southern Quebec
- Coordinates: 45°17′N 73°25′W
- Country: Canada
- Province: Quebec
- Region: Montérégie
- RCM: Les Jardins-de-Napierville
- Constituted: July 1, 1855

Government
  - Mayor: Etienne Brunet
  - Federal riding: Beauharnois—Salaberry
  - Prov. riding: Huntingdon

Area
  - Total: 67.68 km^{2} (26.13 sq mi)
  - Land: 67.18 km^{2} (25.94 sq mi)

Population (2021)
  - Total: 1,766
  - Density: 26.3/km^{2} (68/sq mi)
  - Pop (2016-21): ▲4.5%
  - Dwellings: 739
- Time zone: UTC−5 (EST)
  - Summer (DST): UTC−4 (EDT)
- Postal code(s): J0J 1Z0
- Area codes: 450 and 579
- Highways A-15: R-217
- Website: www.sjlm.ca

Saint-Jacques-le-Mineur (French pronunciation: [sɛ̃ ʒak lə minœʁ]) is a municipality in the Jardins de Napierville Regional County Municipality in Quebec, Canada, situated in the Montérégie administrative region. The population as of the 2021 Canadian census was 1,766.

== Demographics ==
=== Population ===
Canada census – Saint-Jacques-le-Mineur community profile

	2021	2016	2011
Population	1,766 (+4.5% from 2016)	1,690 (+1.1% from 2011)	1,672 (+2.7% from 2006)
Land area	67.18 km^{2} (25.94 sq mi)	67.19 km^{2} (25.94 sq mi)	67.25 km^{2} (25.97 sq mi)
Population density	26.3/km^{2} (68/sq mi)	25.2/km^{2} (65/sq mi)	24.9/km^{2} (64/sq mi)
Median age	37.2 (M: 38.4, F: 35.6)	44.4 (M: 45.0, F: 43.7)	40.8 (M: 41.2, F: 40.3)
Private dwellings	739 (total) 714 (occupied)	650 (total) 637 (occupied)	658 (total)
Median household income	$90,000	$64,960	$62,037

References: 2021 2016 2011

Historical Census Data - Saint-Jacques-le-Mineur, Quebec

Year	Pop.	±%
1921	907	—
1931	889	−2.0%
1941	977	+9.9%
1951	1,025	+4.9%
1956	1,031	+0.6%
1961	1,038	+0.7%

Year	Pop.	±%
1966	1,049	+1.1%
1971	1,042	−0.7%
1976	1,086	+4.2%
1981	1,203	+10.8%
1986	1,218	+1.2%
1991	1,297	+6.5%

Year	Pop.	±%
1996	1,612	+24.3%
2001	1,573	−2.4%
2006	1,628	+3.5%
2011	1,672	+2.7%
2016	1,690	+1.1%
2021	1,766	+4.5%

Source: Statistics Canada

=== Language ===
Canada Census Mother Tongue - Saint-Jacques-le-Mineur, Quebec
Census	Total	French			English			French & English			Other		
Year	Responses	Count	Trend	Pop %	Count	Trend	Pop %	Count	Trend	Pop %	Count	Trend	Pop %
2011	1,675	1,570	▲6.1%	93.73%	40	▼27.3%	2.39%	15	▲ n/a%	0.90%	50	▼47.4%	2.98%
2006	1,630	1,480	▼3.6%	90.80%	55	▲175.0%	3.37%	0	▼100.0%	0.00%	95	▲850.0%	5.83%
2001	1,575	1,535	▲0.3%	97.46%	20	▼33.3%	1.27%	10	0.0%	0.63%	10	▼33.3%	0.63%
1996	1,585	1,530	n/a	96.53%	30	n/a	1.89%	10	n/a	0.63%	15	n/a	0.95%

== See also ==
- List of municipalities in Quebec
