= Les Jardins-de-Napierville Regional County Municipality =

Les Jardins-de-Napierville
- Regional county municipality
- Location in province of Quebec
- Coordinates: 45°10′N 73°31′W
- Country: Canada
- Province: Quebec
- Region: Montérégie
- Effective: January 1, 1982
- County seat: Napierville

Government
  - Type: Prefecture
  - Prefect: Yves Boyer

Area
  - Total: 804.51 km^{2} (310.62 sq mi)
  - Land: 802.52 km^{2} (309.85 sq mi)

Population (2021)
  - Total: 30,339
  - Density: 37.8/km^{2} (98/sq mi)
  - Change (2016-21): ▲8.9%
- Time zone: UTC−5 (EST)
  - Summer (DST): UTC−4 (EDT)
- Area codes: 450 and 579
- Website: www.mrcjardins denapierville.ca

Les Jardins-de-Napierville (French pronunciation: [le ʒaʁdɛ̃ də napjɛʁvil], "The Gardens of Napierville") is a regional county municipality (RCM) in southwestern Quebec, Canada, in the Montérégie region. Founded on January 1, 1982. Its seat is Napierville.

== History ==
The RCM was formed on January 1, 1982 by combining historic Napierville County with other municipalities.

== Subdivisions ==
There are 11 subdivisions within the RCM:

Cities & Towns (1)

- Saint-Rémi

Municipalities (8)

- Napierville
- Saint-Bernard-de-Lacolle
- Saint-Cyprien-de-Napierville
- Saint-Édouard
- Saint-Jacques-le-Mineur
- Saint-Michel
- Saint-Patrice-de-Sherrington
- Sainte-Clotilde

Townships (1)

- Hemmingford

Villages (1)

- Hemmingford

== Demographics ==
Historical Census Data - Les Jardins-de-Napierville Regional County Municipality, Quebec

Year	Pop.	±%
1991	21,977	—
1996	22,936	+4.4%
2001	22,820	−0.5%
2006	24,111	+5.7%

Year	Pop.	±%
2011	26,234	+8.8%
2016	27,870	+6.2%
2021	30,339	+8.9%

Source: Statistics Canada

Canada census – Les Jardins-de-Napierville community profile

	2021	2016	2011
Population	30,339 (+8.9% from 2016)	27,870 (+6.2% from 2011)	26,234 (+8.8% from 2006)
Land area	802.52 km^{2} (309.85 sq mi)	803.07 km^{2} (310.07 sq mi)	803.31 km^{2} (310.16 sq mi)
Population density	37.8/km^{2} (98/sq mi)	34.7/km^{2} (90/sq mi)	32.7/km^{2} (85/sq mi)
Median age	40.8 (M: 40.4, F: 40.8)	41.2 (M: 40.7, F: 41.8)	40.9 (M: 40.4, F: 41.4)
Private dwellings	12,446 (total) 11,859 (occupied)	11,789 (total)	10,742 (total)
Median household income	$81,000	$64,332	$56,137

References: 2021 2016 2011

=== Language ===
Canada Census Mother Tongue - Les Jardins-de-Napierville Regional County Municipality, Quebec
Census	Total	French			English			French & English			Other		
Year	Responses	Count	Trend	Pop %	Count	Trend	Pop %	Count	Trend	Pop %	Count	Trend	Pop %
2016	27,725	25,040	▲7.2%	90.3%	1,650	▼2.1%	6.0%	240	▲9.1%	0.9%	795	▼8.6%	2.9%
2011	26,125	23,350	▲9.8%	89.38%	1,685	▲11.2%	6.45%	220	▲41.9%	0.84%	870	▼1.1%	3.33%
2006	23,785	21,235	▲4.8%	89.28%	1,515	▼5.0%	6.37%	155	0.0%	0.65%	880	▲72.5%	3.70%
2001	22,525	20,265	▼1.1%	89.97%	1,595	▲0.9%	7.08%	155	▲72.2%	0.69%	510	▼1.0%	2.26%
1996	22,670	20,485	n/a	90.36%	1,580	n/a	6.97%	90	n/a	0.40%	515	n/a	2.27%

== Transportation ==
=== Access Routes ===
Highways and numbered routes that run through the municipality, including external routes that start or finish at the county border:

- Autoroutes
  - A-15
- Principal Highways
  - None
- Secondary Highways
  - R-202
  - R-205
  - R-209
  - R-217
  - R-219
  - R-221
- External Routes
  - I-87
  - NY 22

== See also ==
- List of regional county municipalities and equivalent territories in Quebec
