= Hemmingford, Quebec (township) =

Hemmingford
- Township municipality
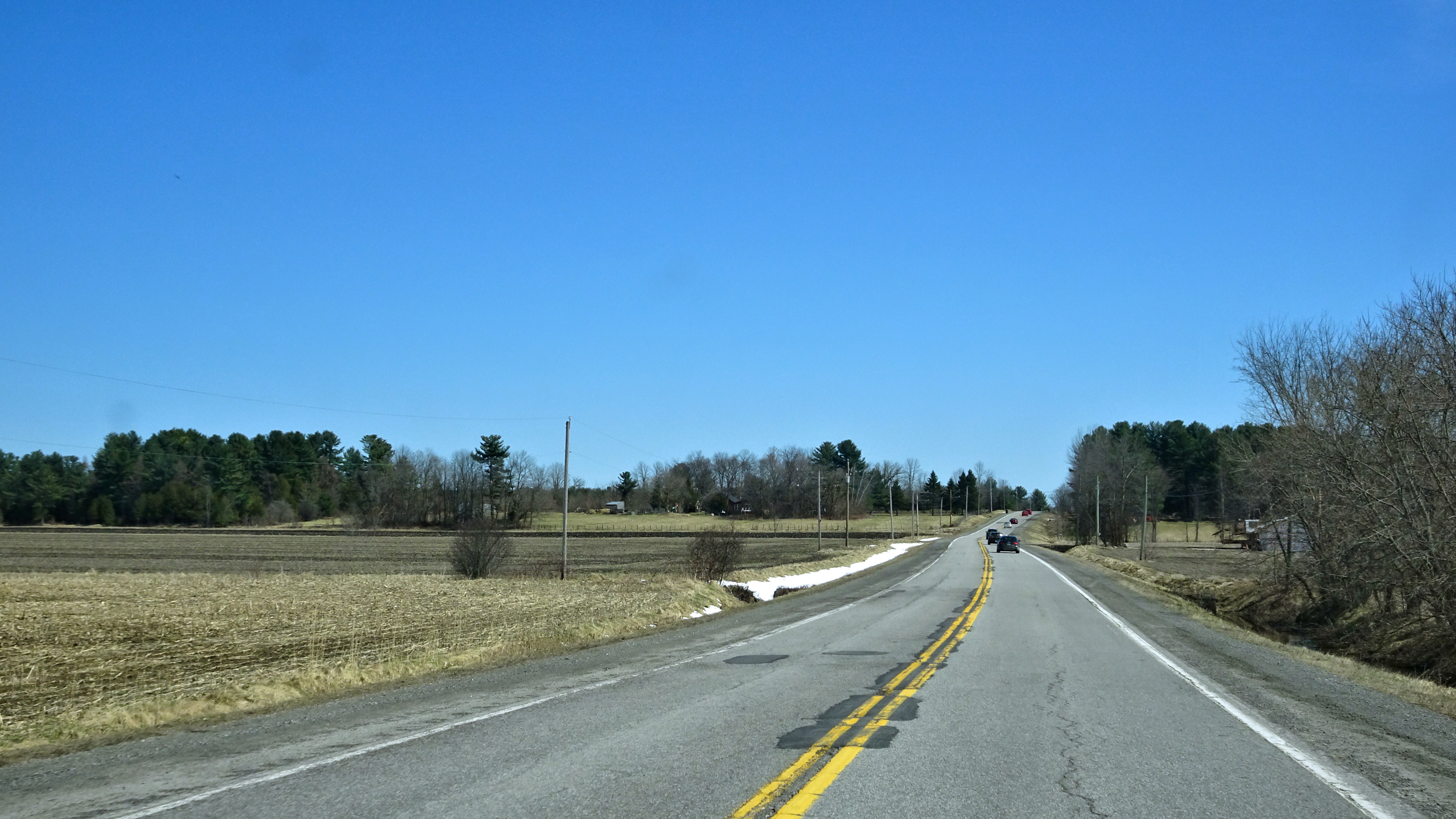

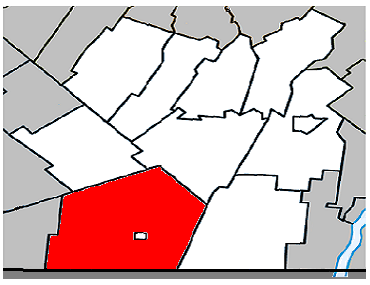
- Location within Les Jardins-de-Napierville RCM

- Location in southern Quebec
- Coordinates: 45°05′N 73°35′W
- Country: Canada
- Province: Quebec
- Region: Montérégie
- RCM: Les Jardins-de-Napierville
- Constituted: July 1, 1855

Government
  - Mayor: Lucien Bouchard
  - Federal riding: Châteauguay—Les Jardins-de-Napierville
  - Prov. riding: Huntingdon

Area
  - Total: 157.31 km^{2} (60.74 sq mi)
  - Land: 157.22 km^{2} (60.70 sq mi)

Population (2021)
  - Total: 1,995
  - Density: 12.7/km^{2} (33/sq mi)
  - Pop (2016-21): ▲5.0%
  - Dwellings: 899
- Demonym: Hemmingfordien
- Time zone: UTC−5 (EST)
  - Summer (DST): UTC−4 (EDT)
- Postal code(s): J0L 1H0
- Area codes: 450 and 579
- Highways: R-202 R-205 R-219
- Geocode: 68015
- Website: canton.hemmingford.ca

Hemmingford is a township municipality in south-west Quebec. The population as of the 2021 Canadian census was 1,995. The township completely surrounds the Village of Hemmingford. The two entities (village and township) are locally referred to collectively as Hemmingford. The two share many things, such as the cost of the volunteer fire department, and both hold their councils and offices in the same building in the village.

== History ==
The geographic township was established in 1799, and named after Hemingford Abbots, in Huntingdonshire, England. The Saint-Romain-de-Hemmingford mission was set up in 1838 (which became a parish in 1853), while the first Anglican church was built 1843.

On July 1, 1845, the Township Municipality of Hemmingford was founded, but on September 1, 1847, it merged with Hinchinbrooke, Godmanchester, Dundee, St. Anicet, and Russeltown, to form the Municipality of Beauharnois Numéro Deux. On July 1, 1855, this merger was undone and the Township Municipality of Hemmingford was reestablished.

Subsequently, the territory of the township was successively partitioned in 1857, 1863, and 1878 to form to the new municipalities of Franklin, Havelock and the Village of Hemmingford respectively.

== Geography ==
The township of Hemmingford is located due south of Montreal in the Jardins-de-Napierville in the Montérégie region, in the south-east corner of the former Huntingdon County. It sits between what was the Seigniory of Beauharnois and Seigniory of Lacolle. Prior to its survey in 1792 and 1793, the Township was called "Waste lands". Since the mid 1800's Hemmingford has been known as being part of one of the main apple producing regions in Quebec.

The township borders the townships of Havelock, St-Chrysostome, St-Clotilde, Sherrington, and St-Bernard-de-Lacolle. Its southern border is the Canada–United States border with Clinton County, in New York State.

=== Hamlets ===
The following locations reside within the municipality's boundaries:

- Barrington (45°6′35.9994″N 73°34′18.696″W) – a hamlet situated at the junction of Rte 219 and Fisher Road.
- Hallerton (45°4′18.9984″N 73°31′46.9992″W) – a hamlet situated on Williams Road.
- The Fort (45°2′42″N 73°41′12.9978″W) – a hamlet located along Quebec Route 202 in the west towards Havelock

== Demographics ==
In the 2021 Census of Population conducted by Statistics Canada, Hemmingford had a population of 1,995 living in 821 of its 899 total private dwellings, a change of 5% from its 2016 population of 1,900. With a land area of 157.22 km^{2} (60.70 sq mi), it had a population density of 12.7/km^{2} (32.9/sq mi) in 2021.

Canada census – Hemmingford (township), Quebec community profile

	2021	2016	2011
Population	1,995 (+5.0% from 2016)	1,900 (+8.8% from 2011)	1,747 (-0.9% from 2006)
Land area	157.22 km^{2} (60.70 sq mi)	157.59 km^{2} (60.85 sq mi)	157.36 km^{2} (60.76 sq mi)
Population density	12.7/km^{2} (33/sq mi)	12.1/km^{2} (31/sq mi)	11.1/km^{2} (29/sq mi)
Median age	50.4 (M: 51.2, F: 49.6)	50.3 (M: 49.9, F: 50.8)	49.3 (M: 49.0, F: 49.6)
Private dwellings	899 (total) 821 (occupied)	899 (total) 783 (occupied)	823 (total)
Median household income	$75,000	$62,251	$53,743

References: 2021 2016 2011

Historical Census Data - Hemmingford (township), Quebec

Year	Pop.	±%
1921	1,589	—
1931	1,369	−13.8%
1941	1,399	+2.2%
1951	1,416	+1.2%
1956	1,431	+1.1%
1961	1,617	+13.0%

Year	Pop.	±%
1966	1,587	−1.9%
1971	1,673	+5.4%
1976	1,752	+4.7%
1981	1,755	+0.2%
1986	1,700	−3.1%
1991	1,693	−0.4%

Year	Pop.	±%
1996	1,748	+3.2%
2001	1,703	−2.6%
2006	1,763	+3.5%
2011	1,747	−0.9%
2016	1,900	+8.8%
2021	1,955	+2.9%

Population counts are not adjusted for boundary changes.
Source: Statistics Canada

Canada Census Mother Tongue - Hemmingford (township), Quebec
Census	Total	French			English			French & English			Other		
Year	Responses	Count	Trend	Pop %	Count	Trend	Pop %	Count	Trend	Pop %	Count	Trend	Pop %
2011	1,725	925	▲7.6%	53.62%	625	▼15.0%	36.23%	35	▲40.0%	2.03%	140	▼3.4%	8.12%
2006	1,765	860	▲11.0%	48.73%	735	▲6.5%	41.64%	25	▼61.5%	1.42%	145	▼12.1%	8.21%
2001	1,695	775	▼20.9%	45.72%	690	▲5.3%	40.71%	65	▲550.0%	3.83%	165	▲65.0%	9.73%
1996	1,745	980	n/a	56.16%	655	n/a	37.54%	10	n/a	0.57%	100	n/a	5.73%

== Local government ==
List of former mayors:

- John Byrne (1845–1847)
- William Barrett (1855–1860)
- Richard Hayes (1860–1862)
- John Scriver (1862–1864)
- William Barington Johnson (1864–1868, 1870–1896)
- Donald Mc Naughton (1868–1870)
- William J. Robson (1896–1898)
- James Fisher (1898–1900, 1910–1912)
- Patrick Leahy (1900–1902)
- Joseph Merlin (1902–1907)
- Joseph Mc Kirryher (1907–1910)
- William Horne (1912–1914, 1915–1916)
- Narcisse Lavallée (1914–1915)
- A. E. Mc Crea (1916–1917)
- Robert Thomson Brownlee (1917–1927)
- Charles Collings (1927–1941)
- Moise Lavallée (1941–1945)
- Henry Alister Darby Somerville (1945–1949, 1961–1965)
- Henri Philion (1949–1953)
- Vernon Ellerton (1953–1957)
- Joseph Perras (1957–1961)
- Florian Dauphimais (1965–1969)
- William J. Brown (1969–1973)
- Karl Kramell (...–2005)
- Jean-Pierre Bergeron (2005–2009)
- Paul Viau (2009–2021)
- Lucien Bouchard (2021–present)

== Attractions ==
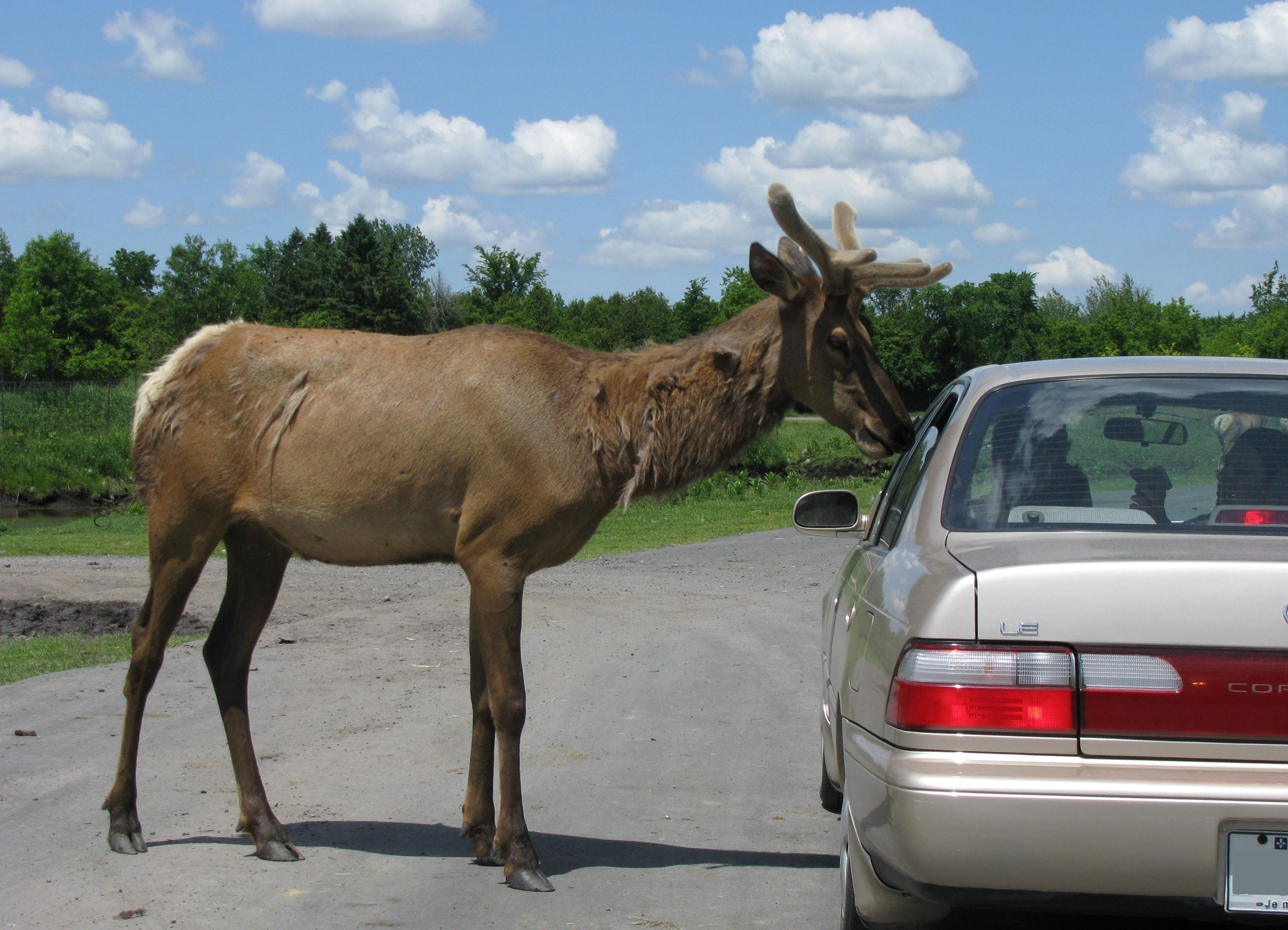
Parc Safari

Some of the local attractions include Parc Safari and Hemmingford Golf and Country Club. The town supports many commercial apple growers, as well as cideries and wineries which include; Cidrerie Du Minot, Domaine du Salamandre, le Chat Botté, Vignes des Bacchantes and Cidrerie C.E.Petch.

== See also ==
- Hemingford, Nebraska
- List of anglophone communities in Quebec
- List of township municipalities in Quebec
- Village of Hemmingford
