= Napierville =

- Municipality
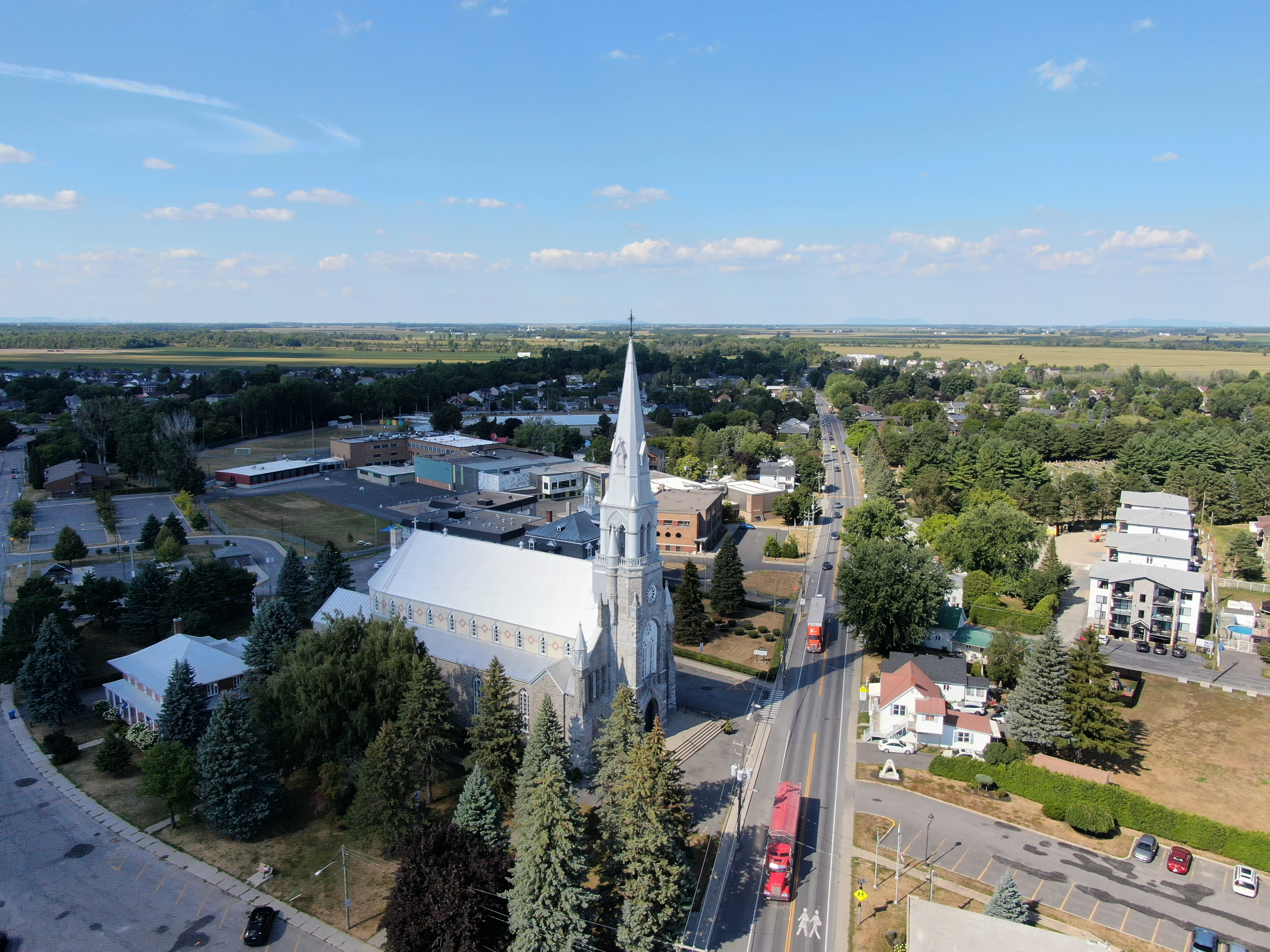
- Aerial view of Napierville

- Coat of arms

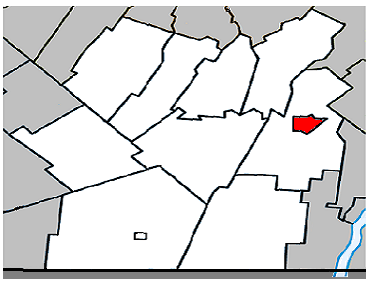
- Location within Les Jardins-de-Napierville RCM

- Location in southern Quebec Napierville (Canada)
- Coordinates: 45°11′N 73°24′W
- Country: Canada
- Province: Quebec
- Region: Montérégie
- RCM: Les Jardins-de-Napierville
- Constituted: January 1, 1873

Government
  - Mayor: Chantale Pelletier
  - Federal riding: Châteauguay—Les Jardins-de-Napierville
  - Prov. riding: Huntingdon

Area
  - Total: 4.49 km^{2} (1.73 sq mi)
  - Land: 4.50 km^{2} (1.74 sq mi)
- There is an apparent contradiction between two authoritative sources

Population (2021)
  - Total: 4,020
  - Density: 893.3/km^{2} (2,314/sq mi)
  - Pop (2016-21): ▲3.1
  - Dwellings: 1,740
- Time zone: UTC−05:00 (EST)
  - Summer (DST): UTC−04:00 (EDT)
- Postal code(s): J0J 1L0
- Area codes: 450 and 579
- Highways: R-219 R-221
- Website: www.napierville.ca

Napierville (French pronunciation: [napjɛʁvil]) is a municipality in the Jardins de Napierville Regional County Municipality in Quebec, Canada, situated in the Montérégie administrative region. The population as of the 2021 Canadian Census was 4,020. It is the location of the seat of the Jardins de Napierville Regional County Municipality. It is surrounded by the municipality of Saint-Cyprien-de-Napierville.

== History ==
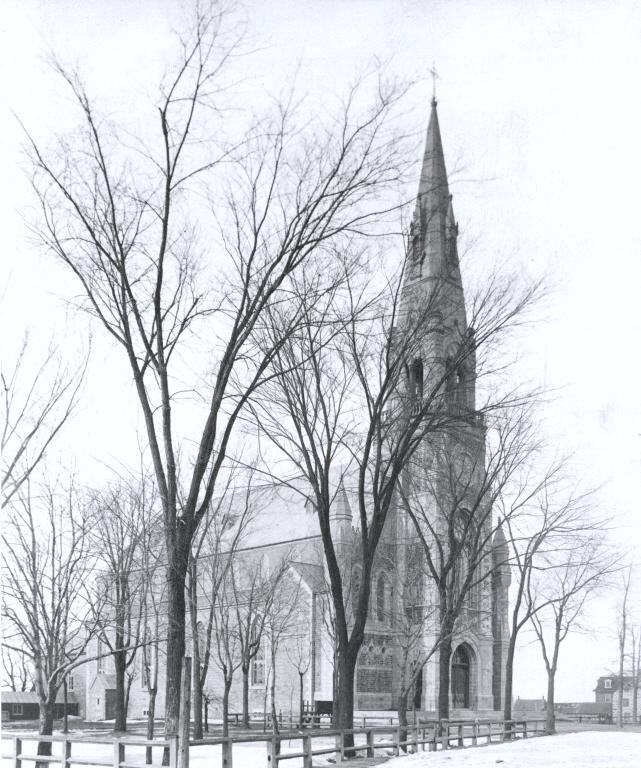
Church of St-Cyprien-de-Napierville in Napierville, circa 1890

The area opened for settlement in the early 19th century. At that time, the lands were part of the Seignory of Léry, owned by Napier Christie Burton who had inherited the seignory upon the death of his father, Gabriel Christie, in 1799. The seignory was looked after by Samuel Potts as temporary agent until 1815, and then by Edme Henry, who managed the Christie seignories for twenty years. In 1822, Edme Henry donated land in Napierville for the construction of a Catholic church.

Around 1823, the place was called "Les Côtes", meaning "the hills" and referred to its uneven terrain. In 1832, its post office opened.

In 1855, it was first incorporated as the Village Municipality of Napierville, named after Napier Christie Burton. In 1857, it was dissolved and merged with Saint-Cyprien. On January 1, 1873, the Village Municipality of Napierville was reestablished when it separated from the Parish Municipality of St-Cyprien.

On April 4, 2009, the Village Municipality of Napierville changed statutes and became a regular municipality.

== Demographics ==
=== Population ===
Canada census – Napierville community profile

	2021	2016	2011
Population	4,020 (+3.1% from 2016)	3,899 (+10,6% from 2011)	3,525 (+5.2% from 2006)
Land area	4.50 km^{2} (1.74 sq mi)	4.37 km^{2} (1.69 sq mi)	4.43 km^{2} (1.71 sq mi)
Population density	893.3/km^{2} (2,314/sq mi)	892.8/km^{2} (2,312/sq mi)	796.6/km^{2} (2,063/sq mi)
Median age	40.4 (M: 40.4, F: 40.4)	39.5 (M: 39.1, F: 40.1)	40.2 (M: 38.9, F: 41.1)
Private dwellings	1,740 (total) 1,638 (occupied)	1,628 (total)	1,465 (total)
Median household income	$80,000	$63,296	$51,729

References: 2021 2016 2011

Historical Census Data - Napierville, Quebec

Year	Pop.	±%
1921	741	—
1931	857	+15.7%
1941	990	+15.5%
1951	1,356	+37.0%
1956	1,510	+11.4%
1961	1,812	+20.0%

Year	Pop.	±%
1966	2,010	+10.9%
1971	1,987	−1.1%
1976	2,166	+9.0%
1981	2,343	+8.2%
1986	2,551	+8.9%
1991	2,909	+14.0%

Year	Pop.	±%
1996	3,004	+3.3%
2001	3,073	+2.3%
2006	3,352	+9.1%
2011	3,525	+5.2%
2016	3,899	+10.6%
2021	4,020	+3.1%

Population amounts are not adjusted for boundary changes (Napierville annexed parts of St-Cyprien in 1966 and 1970).
Source: Statistics Canada

=== Language ===
Canada Census Mother Tongue - Napierville, Quebec
Census	Total	French			English			French & English			Other		
Year	Responses	Count	Trend	Pop %	Count	Trend	Pop %	Count	Trend	Pop %	Count	Trend	Pop %
2016	3,899	3,730	▲10.4%	95.7%	105	▲16.7%	2.7%	15	▼ -40.0%	0.4%	5	▼ -80.0%	0.1%
2011	3,520	3,380	▲6.0%	96.02%	90	0.0%	2.56%	25	▼37.5%	0.71%	25	▼16.7%	0.71%
2006	3,350	3,190	▲8.3%	95.22%	90	▲200.0%	2.69%	40	▲ n/a%	1.19%	30	▲200.0%	0.90%
2001	2,985	2,945	▲2.4%	98.66%	30	▼64.7%	1.00%	0	▼100.0%	0.00%	10	▲ n/a%	0.33%
1996	2,970	2,875	n/a	96.80%	85	n/a	2.86%	10	n/a	0.34%	0	n/a	0.00%

== Local government ==
List of former mayors:

- Joseph Gaspard Laviolette (1873–1876)
- Toussaint Catudal (1876–1892)
- Jean Rigobert Morrier (1892–1895)
- Narcisse Catudal (1895–1898)
- Julius Marceau (1898–1899)
- Gilbert Smith (1899–1902)
- Cyrille Bourgeois (1902–1903)
- Raphaël Martineau (1903–1904)
- Louis Napoléon McQueen (1904–1908)
- Pierre Bourgeois (1908–1917)
- Zénon Isabelle (1917–1921)
- Wilfrid Gadoua (1921–1925, 1927–1929, 1933–1935)
- Arthur P. Beaulieu (1925–1927, 1929–1933)
- Jean Beaudin (1935–1941, 1945–1953)
- Jean Gadoua (1941–1945)
- Henri Grégoire (1953–1955, 1957–1960, 1967–1969)
- Maurice Bourgeois (1955–1957, 1960–1963)
- Joseph Jules Émile Bisaillon (1963–1967)
- Jacques Bourgeois (1969–1973)
- Georges Martin (1973–1978)
- Robert Gadoua (1978–1980)
- Florent Coache (1980–1981, 1994–1998)
- Raynald Martineau (1981–1987)
- Michel Charbonneau (1987–1989)
- Jean Béchard (1989–1990)
- Gilles Montbleau (1990–1994)
- Maurice Tremblay (1998–2000)
- Serge Ouimet (2000–2001)
- Alain Fredette (2001–2013)
- Jacques Délisle (2013–2016)
- Chantale Pelletier (2016–present)

== Notable people ==
- Louis Cyr, strongman

== See also ==
- List of municipalities in Quebec
