= Hemmingford, Quebec (village) =

Hemmingford
- Village municipality
- Hemmingford in 2026

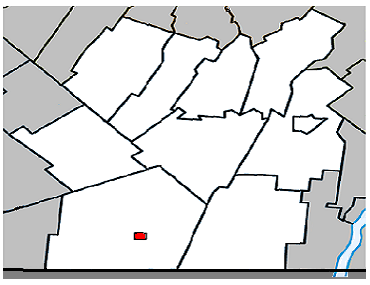
- Location within Les Jardins-de-Napierville RCM

- Location in southern Quebec
- Coordinates: 45°03′N 73°35′W
- Country: Canada
- Province: Quebec
- Region: Montérégie
- RCM: Les Jardins-de-Napierville
- Constituted: January 1, 1878

Government
  - Mayor: Drew Somerville
  - Federal riding: Châteauguay—Les Jardins-de-Napierville
  - Prov. riding: Huntingdon

Area
  - Total: 1.08 km^{2} (0.42 sq mi)
  - Land: 1.07 km^{2} (0.41 sq mi)

Population (2021)
  - Total: 829
  - Density: 775.6/km^{2} (2,009/sq mi)
  - Pop (2016-21): ▲9.8%
  - Dwellings: 403
- Time zone: UTC−5 (EST)
  - Summer (DST): UTC−4 (EDT)
- Postal code(s): J0L 1H0
- Area codes: 450 and 579
- Highways: R-202 R-219
- Census profile: 2468010
- MAMROT info: 68010
- Toponymie info: 28437
- Website: www.villagedehemmingford.ca

Hemmingford is a village municipality located in Les Jardins-de-Napierville Regional County Municipality of southern Quebec. The population as of 2021 was 829.

It was founded in 1878 by the division of the Township of Hemmingford creating two separate entities: the Township and the Village of Hemmingford. Both municipalities are locally referred to collectively as Hemmingford. The two share many things, such as the cost of the volunteer fire department and both hold their councils and offices in the same building in the village.

The village of Hemmingford is surrounded by the Township of Hemmingford. The centre of the village is at the intersection of Route 219 and Route 202.

The postal code for both the town and village of Hemmingford is J0L 1H0.

== History ==
One of the earliest inhabitants of the place was Frederick Scriver, a Loyalist who settled there around 1800. Consequently, the place was known for nearly 30 years as Scriver Corners.

On January 1, 1878, the Village Municipality of Hemmingford was founded when it separated from the township. It took the name of the surrounding township, which in turn was named after Hemingford Abbots, in Huntingdonshire, England.

== Demographics ==
In the 2021 Census of Population conducted by Statistics Canada, Hemmingford had a population of 829 living in 379 of its 403 total private dwellings, a change of 9.8% from its 2016 population of 755. With a land area of 1.07 km^{2} (0.41 sq mi), it had a population density of 774.8/km^{2} (2,006.6/sq mi) in 2021.

Canada census – Hemmingford (village), Quebec community profile

	2021	2016	2011
Population	829 (+9.8% from 2016)	755 (-6.6% from 2011)	808 (+6.7% from 2006)
Land area	1.07 km^{2} (0.41 sq mi)	0.91 km^{2} (0.35 sq mi)	1.03 km^{2} (0.40 sq mi)
Population density	775.6/km^{2} (2,009/sq mi)	826.7/km^{2} (2,141/sq mi)	783.2/km^{2} (2,028/sq mi)
Median age	44.8 (M: 43.6, F: 46.4)	45.1 (M: 45.9, F: 43.7)	44.8 (M: 44.4, F: 45.0)
Private dwellings	403 (total) 379 (occupied)	350 (total)	383 (total)
Median household income	$61,200	$47,360	$44,042

References: 2021 2016 2011

Historical Census Data - Hemmingford (village), Quebec

Year	Pop.	±%
1921	345	—
1931	368	+6.7%
1941	429	+16.6%
1951	568	+32.4%
1956	682	+20.1%
1961	778	+14.1%

Year	Pop.	±%
1966	789	+1.4%
1971	810	+2.7%
1976	763	−5.8%
1981	737	−3.4%
1986	705	−4.3%
1991	729	+3.4%

Year	Pop.	±%
1996	751	+3.0%
2001	724	−3.6%
2006	757	+4.6%
2011	808	+6.7%
2016	755	−6.6%
2021	829	+9.8%

Source: Statistics Canada

Canada Census Mother Tongue - Hemmingford (village), Quebec
Census	Total	French			English			French & English			Other		
Year	Responses	Count	Trend	Pop %	Count	Trend	Pop %	Count	Trend	Pop %	Count	Trend	Pop %
2011	810	355	▼6.6%	43.83%	395	▲25.4%	48.76%	20	0.0%	2.47%	40	0.0%	4.94%
2006	755	380	▲13.4%	50.33%	315	▼8.7%	41.72%	20	▲ n/a%	2.65%	40	▲14.3%	5.30%
2001	715	335	▼25.6%	46.85%	345	▲21.1%	48.25%	0	▼100.0%	0.00%	35	▲ n/a%	4.90%
1996	745	450	n/a	60.40%	285	n/a	38.26%	10	n/a	1.34%	0	n/a	0.00%

== Local government ==
List of former mayors:

- Robert Wood (1878–1881)
- William Ray (1881–1890)
- John F. Scriver (1890–1907)
- Robert W. Blair (1907–1909, 1917–1925, 1927–1928)
- George William Keddy (1909–1912)
- James Mc Canse (1912–1917)
- Thomas George Mc Clatchie (1925–1927, 1928–1931)
- Wilfrid Lacasse (1931–1941)
- Léo Fortin (1941–1965)
- Joseph Walter Bernard Smith (1965–1967)
- Henry Alister Darby Somerville (1967–1973)
- Maurice Patenaude (1973–1993)
- Mario Fortin (1993–1997)
- Claude Mailloux (1997–2001)
- Andrew Merlin Somerville (2001–present)

== See also ==
- English River (Chateauguay River tributary)
- List of anglophone communities in Quebec
- List of village municipalities in Quebec
