= Saint-Régis River (Roussillon) =

River in Quebec, Canada

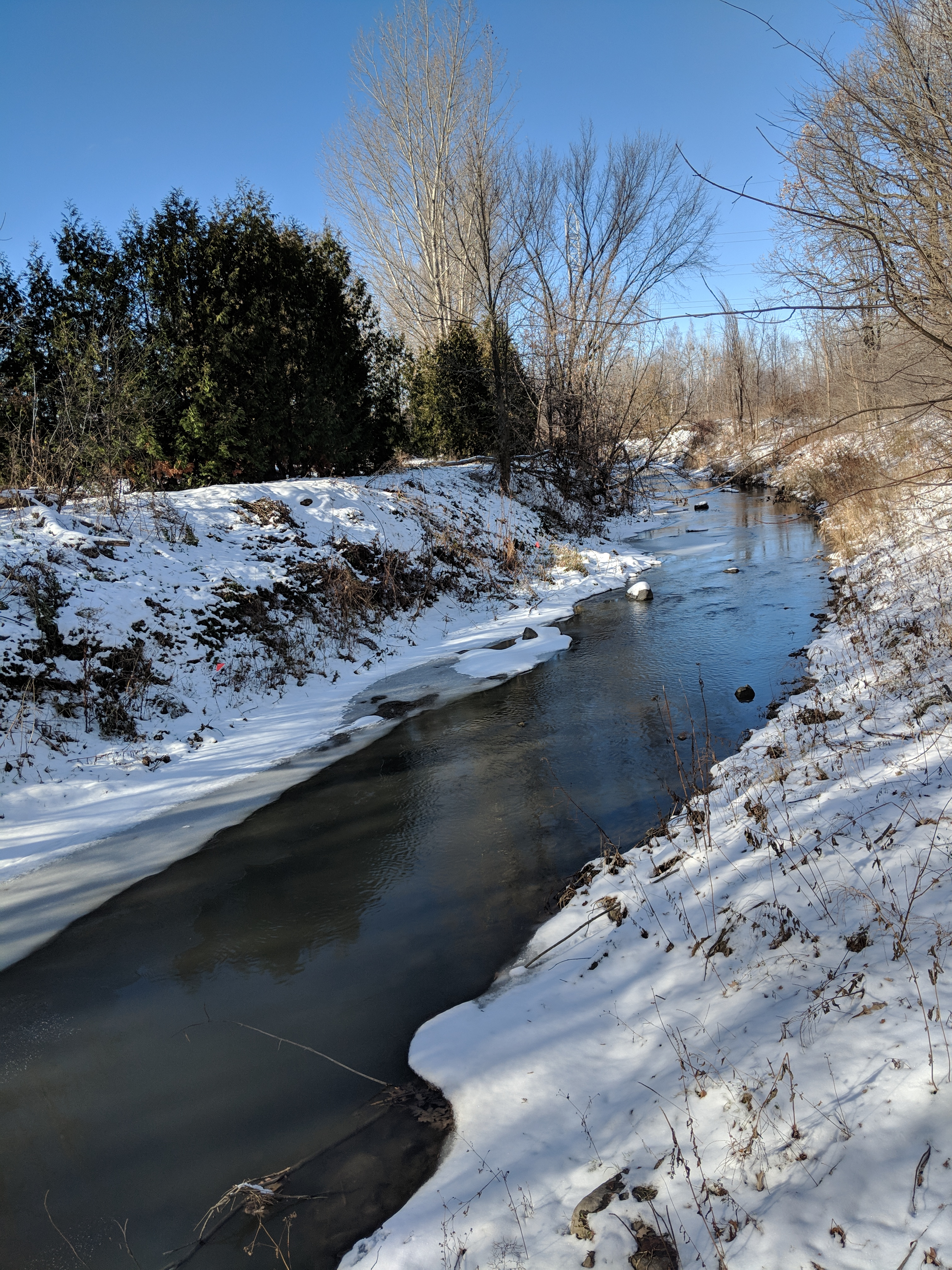
- Saint-Régis River at Saint-Constant taken in November 2018

Location
- Country: Canada
- Province: Quebec
- Region: Montérégie
- MRC: Roussillon Regional County Municipality

Physical characteristics
- Source: Various agricultural and urban streams, woodlands, wetlands and small bodies of water.
  - location: Saint-Isidore
  - coordinates: 45.292965°N 73.684029°W
  - elevation: 52
- Mouth: St. Lawrence Seaway
  - location: Sainte-Catherine
  - coordinates: 45.40583°N 73.57166°W
  - elevation: 118 m (387 ft)
- Length: 19.2 km (11.9 mi)
- Basin size: 97.2 km^{2} (37.5 sq mi)

Basin features
- Tributaries
  - left: (upstream)
  - right: (upstream) Saint-Pierre River, Saint-Simon stream, Santoire stream, Lefrançois stream, Boyer branch, Lussier branch, Sainte-Marie branch, Houle stream.

The Saint-Régis River is a tributary of the south shore of the St. Lawrence River. The Saint-Régis river flows in the municipality of Saint-Isidore, Saint-Constant and Sainte-Catherine, in the Roussillon Regional County Municipality, in the administrative region of Montérégie, in the southwest of Quebec, in Canada.

== Geography ==
The main neighboring hydrographic slopes of the Saint-Régis river are:

- north side: St. Lawrence Seaway, St. Lawrence River;
- east side: Saint-Pierre River;
- south side: Rivière Noire, rivière de l'Esturgeon, Châteauguay River;
- west side: Suzanne river, De Lorimier stream, Châteauguay River;

With a length of 19.2 kilometres (11.9 mi) and covering an area of 92 kilometres (57.17 mi), the Saint-Régis river takes its source from a set of agricultural streams around the village of Saint-Isidore, located northeast of the town of Saint-Rémi, east of the town of Mercier and south of Châteauguay.

The Saint-Pierre river is a tributary of the Saint-Régis river.

The river takes its source in a dense network of waterways and agricultural ditches which drain the northern flank of the Plateau de Saint-Michel. This topographic entity advances westward to Mercier, thus marking the boundary of the watershed between the Saint-Régis river and the rivière de l'Esturgeon. The supraregional aquifer is recharged at Saint-Michel and Saint-Rémi and then flows in all directions, the west and north-west currents flowing into the Saint-Régis watershed. The regional aquifer is recharged in the Adirondacks, the United States and to a lesser extent in the Rock, southwest of Huntington and Covey Hill.

The groundwater of the local water table depending on the level of the river, with a time lag. The permeable till is exposed below the river, which allows the river to recharge the water table, especially since the till is located under the impermeable clay layer. The piezometric level of the water table goes down proportionally with the stream, going from 18.4m upstream to 13.10m downstream.

From the village of Saint-Isidore, the Saint-Régis river flows northeast through agricultural land. The river is bordered on the northwest side by Highway 30 and Highway 730. After crossing under the Autoroute 30 bridge, the Saint-Régis river crosses the railroad and the town of Saint-Constant to the northeast; then it crosses Route 132 in the town of Sainte-Catherine where it collects the water from the Saint-Pierre River. Then the river on 2.6 kilometres (1.6 mi) in Sainte-Catherine to its mouth.

The mouth of the Saint-Régis river is located very close to the Côte-Sainte-Catherine lock, 3 kilometres (1.9 mi) upstream from the mouth of the rivière de la Tortue. The mouth is located in front of the Lachine Rapids on the St. Lawrence River.

The Saint-Régis river is bordered by the rang Saint-Régis-nord and Saint-Régis-Sud paths. Many private residences have been built between the village of Saint-Isidore and route 221 in Saint-Isidore-Jonction.

The average bed width is 4 metres (13 ft) and its depth is approximately 20 at 30 centimetres (12 in). The slopes are approximately 4 to 5 metres (16 ft) high and the deposits are mainly sand, clay silt and organic debris while the bed substrate consists of pebbles, gravels, sand and fine sediment. The slope is fairly gentle all along the river.

Since the urbanization of the 1960s, the course of the river has been greatly modified for drainage purposes.

== Floods ==
In early November, heavy liquid and solid precipitation caused significant flooding. 170 millimetres (6.7 in) of rain fell in 30 hours, an absolute record. More than 400 homes have been evacuated. The water level almost reached the road at the Saint-Laurent Boulevard bridge, where the height between the bridge and the river is usually 3-4m. Since then, a pumping station has been built on the banks of the river, next to boulevard des Écluses.

== Toponymy ==
The toponym "Rivière Saint-Régis" was made official on December 5, 1968, at the Commission de toponymie du Québec.

The town of Sainte-Catherine considers the section of the river between the junction with the Saint-Pierre river and the mouth to be the Portage river. However, the Quebec government considers it to be the Saint-Régis river.

== Miscellaneous ==
An area close to the mouth has significant archaeological potential.

During flood prevention work, the section of the river between Route 132 and the mouth was completely drained for a period of 48 hours.

== See also ==
- List of rivers of Quebec
