= Saint-Pierre River (Saint-Régis River tributary) =

Location
- Country: Canada
- Province: Quebec
- Region: Montérégie
- MRC: Roussillon Regional County Municipality

Physical characteristics
- Source: Various agricultural streams
  - location: Saint-Rémi
  - coordinates: 45.275735°N 73.604201°W
  - elevation: 60
- Mouth: Saint-Regis River
  - location: Saint-Constant
  - coordinates: 45.390441°N 73.558154°W
  - elevation: 17 m (56 ft)
- Length: 11.0 km (6.8 mi)

Basin features
- Tributaries
  - left: (upstream) Sainte-Marie branch, Santoire stream, Lefrançois stream, Houle stream
  - right: (upstream)

The Saint-Pierre river is a tributary of the east bank of the Saint-Regis River. The Saint-Pierre river flows in the municipality of Saint-Rémi (in Les Jardins-de-Napierville Regional County Municipality), and Saint-Constant (in Roussillon Regional County Municipality), in the administrative region of Montérégie, southwest of Quebec, in Canada.

The river surface is generally frozen from mid-December to the end of March. Safe traffic on the ice is generally from late December to early March. The water level of the river varies with the seasons and the precipitation.

== Geography ==
The main hydrographic slopes neighboring the Saint-Pierre river are:

- north side: Saint-Regis River, St. Lawrence Seaway, Saint Lawrence River;
- east side: Rivière de la Tortue (Delson);
- south side: Noire River (rivière de l'Esturgeon);
- west side: rivière de l'Esturgeon (Châteauguay River).

The Saint-Pierre river takes its source from a set of agricultural streams (notably the Cordon and Marcotte streams) draining the area north of the town of Saint-Rémi.

From Saint-Rémi, the Saint-Pierre river flows north into agricultural land. The river is bordered on the east by route 209. After crossing under the Autoroute 30 bridge, the Saint-Pierre river crosses north the town of Saint-Constant where it collects the waters of the western branch coming from the village of Saint-Isidore; then it crosses the territory of the cities of Saint-Constant, Delson and Sainte-Catherine.

The mouth of the Saint-Pierre river is just north of the route 132 where it flows on the east bank of the Saint-Regis river. The mouth of the latter is located very close to the Côte-Sainte-Catherine lock, 3 km upstream of the mouth of the rivière de la Tortue (Delson).

== Toponymy ==
The toponym "Rivière Saint-Pierre" was formalized on December 5, 1968, at the Commission de toponymie du Québec.

== See also ==
- List of rivers of Quebec
