= Quebec Route 205 =

Highway in Quebec, Canada

Route 205

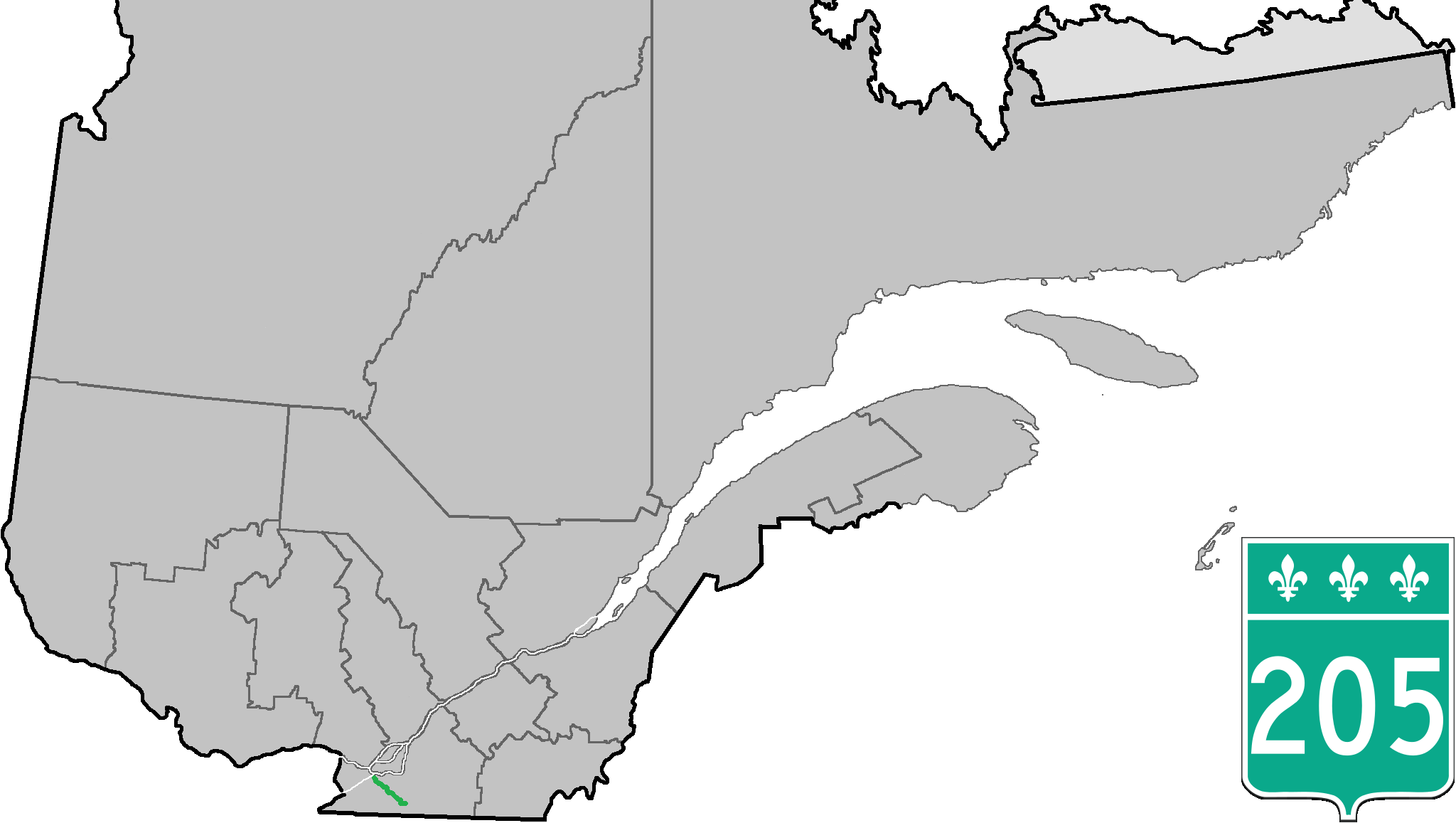

Route information
- Maintained by Transports Québec
- Length: 36 km (22 mi)

Major junctions
- South end: R-219 in Hemmingford (Township)
- R-209 in Sainte-Clotilde; R-207 in Saint-Urbain-Premier; R-138 in Sainte-Martine; A-30 in Beauharnois
- North end: R-132 in Beauharnois

Location
- Country: Canada
- Province: Quebec
- Major cities: Sainte-Martine, Beauharnois

Highway system
- Quebec provincial highways; Autoroutes; List; Former
← R-204	→ R-206

Route 205 is a two-lane north–south highway on the south shore of the Saint Lawrence River in the Montérégie region of Quebec, Canada. Its northern terminus is in Beauharnois at the junction of Route 132 and the southern terminus is at the junction of Route 219, in Hemmingford Township.

== Municipalities along Route 205 ==
- Hemmingford (Township)
- Sainte-Clotilde
- Saint-Urbain-Premier
- Sainte-Martine
- Beauharnois
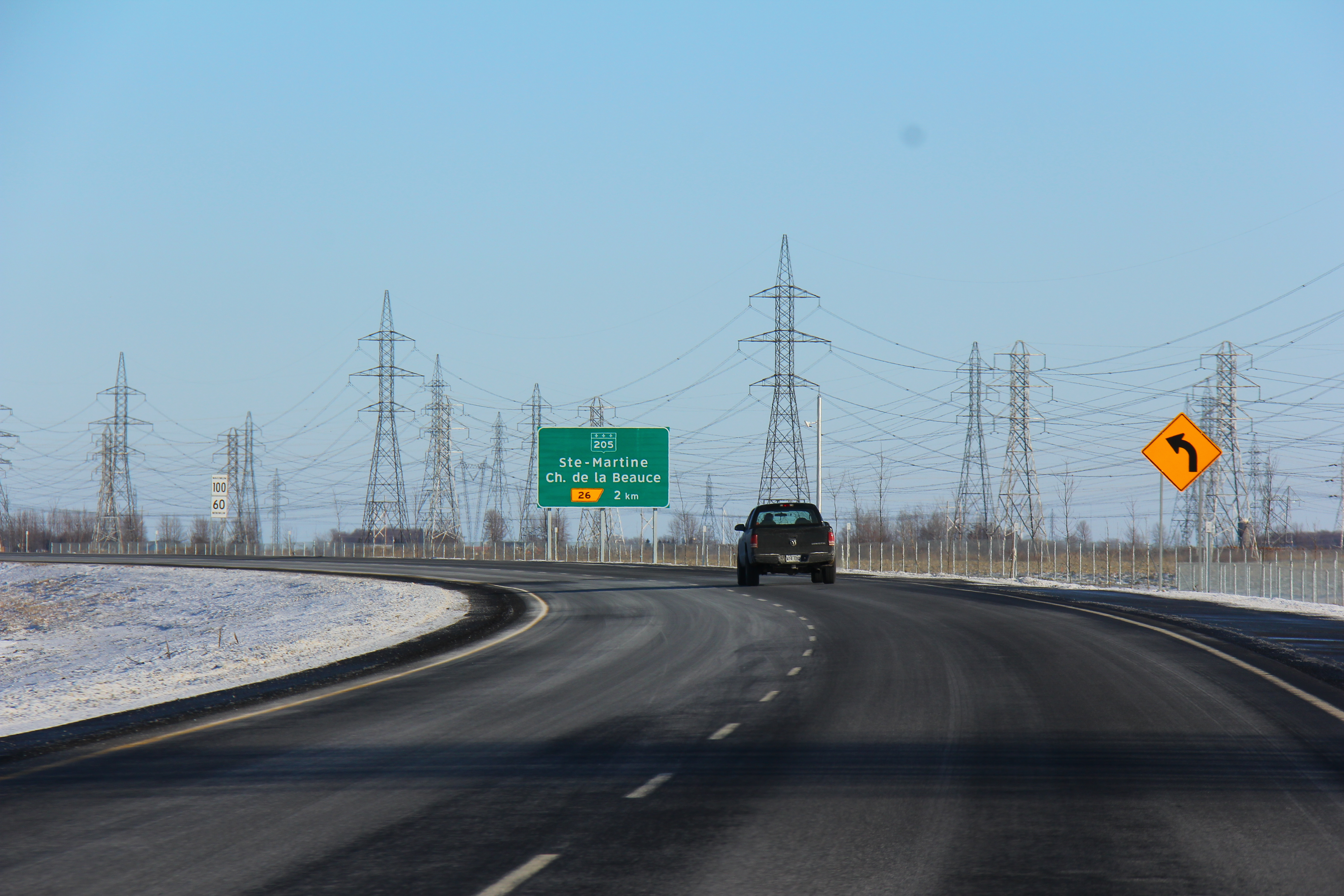
Approaching Route 205 and Autoroute 30 interchange in Beauharnois.

== Major intersections ==
RCM or ET	Municipality	Km	Junction	Notes
Southern terminus of Route 205
Les Jardins-de-Napierville	Hemmingford	0.0	R-219	219 SOUTH: to Hemmingford Village; 219 NORTH: to Saint-Patrice-de-Sherrington
Les Jardins-de-Napierville	Sainte-Clotilde	15.3	R-209	209 SOUTH: to Saint-Chrysostome; 209 NORTH: to Saint-Rémi
Beauharnois-Salaberry	Saint-Urbain-Premier	21.2	R-207 (South end)	207 NORTH: to Saint-Isidore
Beauharnois-Salaberry	Sainte-Martine	28.0; 29.1	R-138 (Overlap 1.1 km)	138 WEST: to Ormstown; 138 EAST: to Mercier
Beauharnois-Salaberry	Beauharnois		A-30	30 WEST: to Salaberry-de-Valleyfield; 30 EAST: to Chateauguay
Beauharnois-Salaberry	Beauharnois	38.8; 38.9	R-132	132 WEST: to Salaberry-de-Valleyfield; 132 EAST: to Léry
Northern terminus of Route 205

== See also ==
- List of Quebec provincial highways
