= Exo du Haut-Saint-Laurent sector =

- Headquarters: 10 King St, Huntingdon
- Service type: bus service, taxibus
- Alliance: Exo
- Operator: Autobus Dufresne
- Website: AMT site (Fr)

The Exo du Haut-Saint-Laurent sector provides a bus service, operated under the auspices of Le Haut-Saint-Laurent Regional County Municipality, in southwestern Quebec, Canada. The CITHSL serves the communities, within the region, of Godmanchester, Howick, Huntingdon, Ormstown, Très-Saint-Sacrement and also Sainte-Martine, in the adjoining Region of Beauharnois-Salaberry, and Mercier in Roussillon Region.

In October 2024 the Haut-Saint-Laurent sector was merged into the Exo Sud-Ouest sector.

== Fixed route bus service ==
While demand response service is available in all of the above communities, CIT also operates one fixed commuter service. The line operates seven days a week, with reduced frequency on weekends. The route starts at Huntingdon and runs along Highway 138 to Montreal; it terminates at either Angrignon station on the Montreal Metro or continues to downtown near the Terminus Centre-Ville bus station. Due to congestion, as of 25 August 2008, the downtown stop was moved out of the bus terminus. Originally, it was to be relocated nearby on Boulevard René-Lévesque along with the CIT du Sud-Ouest (CITSO), but were later moved to rue St-Antoine and Mansfield. Along its route, the bus also stops in Châteauguay and Kahnawake, immediately south of the St. Lawrence River, but does not provide service between Montreal and those communities, which have their own bus service provided by CITSO.
