= Rivière de l'Esturgeon =

Location
- Countries: Canada
- Provinces and territories of Canada: Quebec
- Administrative region: Montérégie
- Regional County Municipality: Beauharnois-Salaberry Regional County Municipality, Roussillon Regional County Municipality

Physical characteristics
- Source
  - location: Saint-Isidore
  - elevation: 48 m (157 ft)
- Mouth
  - location: Sainte-Martine
  - elevation: 38 m (125 ft)
- Length: 14.2 km (8.8 mi)

Basin features
- Tributaries
  - left: (upstream) Two unidentified streams, Large Saint-Rémi stream, unidentified stream, discharge from a small lake, Noire River, Cordon stream.
  - right: (upstream) Poupart discharge.

The rivière de l'Esturgeon (English: Sturgeon River) is a tributary of the Châteauguay River, flowing on the south shore of the Saint Lawrence River, in the administrative region of Montérégie, in the province of Quebec, in Canada. This river flows through the following municipalities:

- Saint-Isidore and Mercier in the MRC of Roussillon Regional County Municipality;
- Sainte-Martine, in the MRC Beauharnois-Salaberry Regional County Municipality.

The lower part of the course of this river is accessible by the Saint-Jean-Baptiste road and the chemin du rang Double. The upper part is mainly accessible by the chemin du rang Saint-Régis.

The surface of the Esturgeon River (except the rapids areas) is generally frozen from mid-December to the end of March; however, safe circulation on the ice is generally done from the end of December to the beginning of March. The water level of the river varies with the seasons and the precipitation; the spring flood occurs in March or April.

== Geography ==
The Esturgeon River rises at the confluence of two agricultural streams. This confluence is located 0.9 kilometres (0.56 mi) south of the village center of Saint-Isidore, 7.1 kilometres (4.4 mi) to the East of the course of the Châteauguay River, at 9.4 kilometres (5.8 mi) north-east of the confluence of the Esturgeon river and the Châteauguay river, at 13 kilometres (8.1 mi) southeast of the mouth of the Châteauguay river.

From its source, the current of the Esturgeon river descends on 14.2 kilometres (8.8 mi), with a drop of 10 metres (33 ft), according to the following segments:

- 3.4 kilometres (2.1 mi) to the south in an agricultural zone, branching south-west at the end of the segment, until the confluence of the Noire River (coming from the east);
- 5.0 kilometres (3.1 mi) to the west in an agricultural area, bypassing a small lake to the northwest, then turns south to the Chemin de la Grande Ligne;
- 1.7 kilometres (1.1 mi) to the south in an agricultural area, collecting a stream (coming from the northeast), up to the outlet Grand cours d'eau Saint-Rémi;
- 1.7 kilometres (1.1 mi) to the west by collecting three agricultural streams, up to chemin du rang Saint-Joseph;
- 2.4 kilometres (1.5 mi) to the west in the agricultural zone by collecting the Poupart landfill (coming from the northeast), then bending to the southwest by crossing the village of Sainte-Martine, by crossing route 138 (route Saint-Jean-Baptiste), to its mouth.

The confluence of the Esturgeon river is located 1.0 kilometre (0.62 mi) downstream of the dam on the Châteauguay river. From its mouth, the current follows on 13.3 kilometres (8.3 mi) the course of the Châteauguay river, which flows on the south bank of the St. Lawrence River.

== Toponymy ==
The toponym "rivière de l'Esturgeon" was formalized on March 3, 1993, at the Commission de toponymie du Québec.

== Appendices ==
=== See also ===
- Beauharnois-Salaberry Regional County Municipality
- Roussillon Regional County Municipality
- Saint-Isidore, a municipality
- Mercier, a municipality
- Sainte-Martine, a municipality
- Châteauguay River
- Noire River
- St. Lawrence River
- List of rivers of Quebec
