= Noire River (rivière de l'Esturgeon) =

Location
- Countries: Canada
- Provinces and territories of Canada: Quebec
- Administrative region: Montérégie
- Regional County Municipality: Roussillon Regional County Municipality and Les Jardins-de-Napierville Regional County Municipality

Physical characteristics
- Source
  - location: Saint-Rémi
  - elevation: 49 m (161 ft)
- Mouth
  - location: Saint-Isidore
  - elevation: 46 m (151 ft)
- Length: 4.2 km (2.6 mi)

The Rivière Noire (English: Black River) is a tributary of the rivière de l'Esturgeon, flowing on the south bank of the St. Lawrence River, in the administrative region of Montérégie, in the province of Quebec, in Canada. This river flows through the following municipalities:

- Saint-Rémi, in the MRC Les Jardins-de-Napierville Regional County Municipality;
- Saint-Isidore in the MRC of Roussillon Regional County Municipality.

The valley of this river is served by the chemin du rang Saint-Régis.

The surface of the Black River (except the rapids areas) is generally frozen from mid-December to the end of March; however, safe circulation on the ice is generally done from the end of December to the beginning of March. The water level of the river varies with the seasons and the precipitation; the spring flood occurs in March or April.

== Geography ==
The Black River has its source in an agricultural area next to the chemin du rang Sainte-Thérèse. This source is located 3.8 kilometres (2.4 mi) south-west of the village center of Saint-Rémi, 5.1 kilometres (3.2 mi) to the south-East of the center of the village of Saint-Isidore, 10.3 kilometres (6.4 mi) northeast of the mouth of the Esturgeon river.

From its source, the current of the Black river descends on 4.2 kilometres (2.6 mi) westwards in agricultural area, with a drop of 3 metres (9.8 ft). The course of the Black River passes under the bridge of Chemin Saint-Régis (route 207)

The confluence of the Black River is located at . From its mouth, the current follows on 10.8 kilometres (6.7 mi) the course of the rivière de l'Esturgeon, on 13.3 kilometres (8.3 mi) the course of the Châteauguay River, which flows onto the south bank of the St. Lawrence River.

== Toponymy ==
The toponym "Rivière Noire" was formalized on August 17, 1978 at the Commission de toponymie du Québec.

== Appendices ==
=== Related articles ===
- Les Jardins-de-Napierville Regional County Municipality
- Roussillon Regional County Municipality
- Saint-Isidore, a municipality
- Saint-Rémi, a municipality
- Châteauguay River
- Rivière de l'Esturgeon
- St. Lawrence River
- List of rivers of Quebec
