= Sainte-Martine, Quebec =

Sainte-Martine
- Municipality
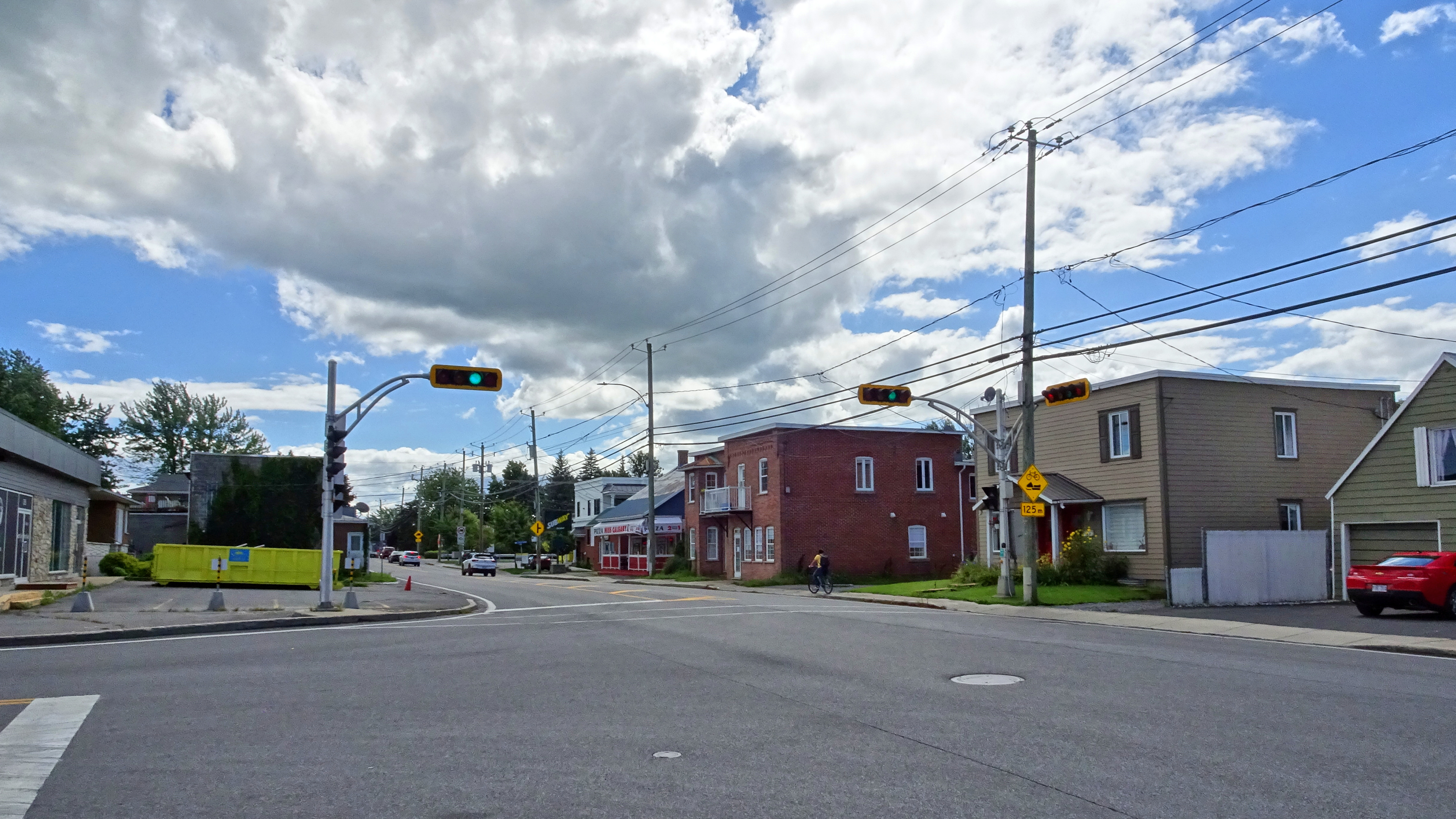

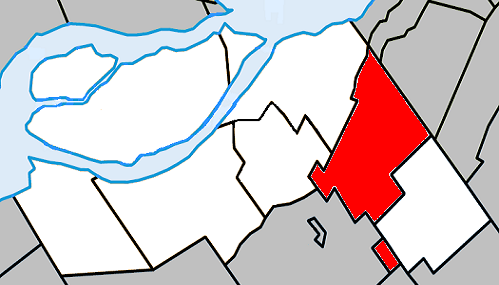
- Location within Beauharnois-Salaberry RCM

- Location in southern Quebec
- Coordinates: 45.25°N 73.8°W
- Country: Canada
- Province: Quebec
- Region: Montérégie
- RCM: Beauharnois-Salaberry
- Constituted: September 9, 1999

Government
  - Mayor: Mélanie Lefort
  - Federal riding: Châteauguay—Les Jardins-de-Napierville
  - Prov. riding: Huntingdon

Area
  - Total: 64.51 km^{2} (24.91 sq mi)
  - Land: 63.06 km^{2} (24.35 sq mi)

Population (2021)
  - Total: 5,664
  - Density: 89.8/km^{2} (233/sq mi)
  - Pop (2016-21): ▲3.7%
  - Dwellings: 2,469
- Time zone: UTC−5 (EST)
  - Summer (DST): UTC−4 (EDT)
- Postal code(s): J0S 1V0
- Area codes: 450 and 579
- Highways: R-138 R-205
- Website: www.municipalite.sainte-martine.qc.ca

Sainte-Martine (French pronunciation: [sɛ̃t maʁtin]) is a municipality in Beauharnois-Salaberry Regional County Municipality in the Montérégie region of Quebec, Canada. The population as of the 2021 Canadian census was 5,664. The municipality is made up of a large northern section and a small unattached southern area that was known as the municipality of Saint-Paul-de-Châteauguay until its merger with Sainte-Martine on September 9, 1999.

== History ==
Sainte-Martine is named in honor of Martina of Rome, martyred in 226. Being already settled and recognize as Sainte-Martine for many years, the status of the municipality was officialized on July 1, 1855, as the parish municipality of Sainte-Martine.

The municipality lost a section of its territory in 1885 for the creation of the parish of Très-Saint-Sacrement. It also lost a sizeable part in 1937 when Saint-Paul-de-Châteauguay split from Saint-Martine to become its own municipality, but it was eventually reattached to Sainte-Martine in 1999.

== Geography ==
=== Communities ===
In addition to the namesake main population centre, the following locations reside within the municipality's boundaries:

- Laberge (45°17′07″N 73°48′25″W) – a hamlet located along Quebec Route 205 in the north part of the municipality.
- La Ferme (45°19′15″N 73°50′20″W) – a residential area located along Quebec Route 138.
- Le Domaine-de-la-Pêche-au-Saumon (45°15′15″N 73°47′55″W) – a residential area located along Quebec Route 138.
- Le Méandre (45°14′55″N 73°47′55″W) – a residential area located along Quebec Route 138.

== Demographics ==
=== Population ===
Canada census – Sainte-Martine community profile

| | 2021 | 2016 | 2011 |
| Population | 5,664 (+3.7% from 2016) | 5,461 (+10.0% from 2011) | 4,966 (+17.2% from 2006) |
| Land area | 63.06 km^{2} (24.35 sq mi) | 63.19 km^{2} (24.40 sq mi) | 63.59 km^{2} (24.55 sq mi) |
| Population density | 89.8/km^{2} (233/sq mi) | 86.4/km^{2} (224/sq mi) | 78.1/km^{2} (202/sq mi) |
| Median age | 41.2 (M: 40.4, F: 42.0) | 39.1 (M: 38.5, F: 39.6) | 39.5 (M: 38.8, F: 40.4) |
| Private dwellings | 2,469 (total) 2407 (occupied) | 2,368 (total) | 2,133 (total) |
| Median household income | | $66,160 | $55,217 |

References: 2021 2016 2011

Historical census data - Sainte-Martine, Quebec

| Year | Pop. | ±% |
|---|---|---|
| 1991+ | 3,593 | — |
| 1996+ | 3,678 | +2.4% |
| 2001 | 3,740 | +1.7% |
| 2006 | 4,237 | +13.3% |

| Year | Pop. | ±% |
|---|---|---|
| 2011 | 4,966 | +17.2% |
| 2016 | 5,461 | +10.0% |
| 2021 | 5,664 | +3.7% |

+) Pre-merger combined population totals for Sainte-Martine (municipality) and Saint-Paul-de-Châteauguay (municipality).
Source: Statistics Canada

=== Language ===
Canada Census mother tongue - Sainte-Martine, Quebec (+) Pre-merger combined population totals for Sainte-Martine (municipality) and Saint-Paul-de-Châteauguay (municipality).
| Census | Total | French | | | English | | | French & English | | | Other | | |
| Year | Responses | Count | Trend | Pop % | Count | Trend | Pop % | Count | Trend | Pop % | Count | Trend | Pop % |
| 2016 | 5,465 | 5,100 | ▲15.6% | 93.3% | 215 | ▲22.9% | 3.9% | 45 | ▲12.5% | 0.8% | 80 | ▲45.5% | 1.5% |
| 2011 | 4,950 | 4,680 | ▲9.0% | 94.54% | 175 | ▲105.9% | 3.54% | 40 | ▲300.0% | 0.81% | 55 | ▼8.3% | 1.11% |
| 2006 | 4,205 | 4,050 | ▲13.9% | 96.31% | 85 | ▼37.0% | 2.02% | 10 | ▼60.0% | 0.24% | 60 | ▲ n/a% | 1.43% |
| 2001 | 3,715 | 3,555 | ▲1.7% | 95.69% | 135 | ▲22.7% | 3.63% | 25 | ▼37.5% | 0.67% | 0 | 0.0% | 0.00% |
| 1996 | 3,645+ | 3,495 | n/a | 95.88% | 110 | n/a | 3.02% | 40 | n/a | 1.10% | 0 | n/a | 0.00% |

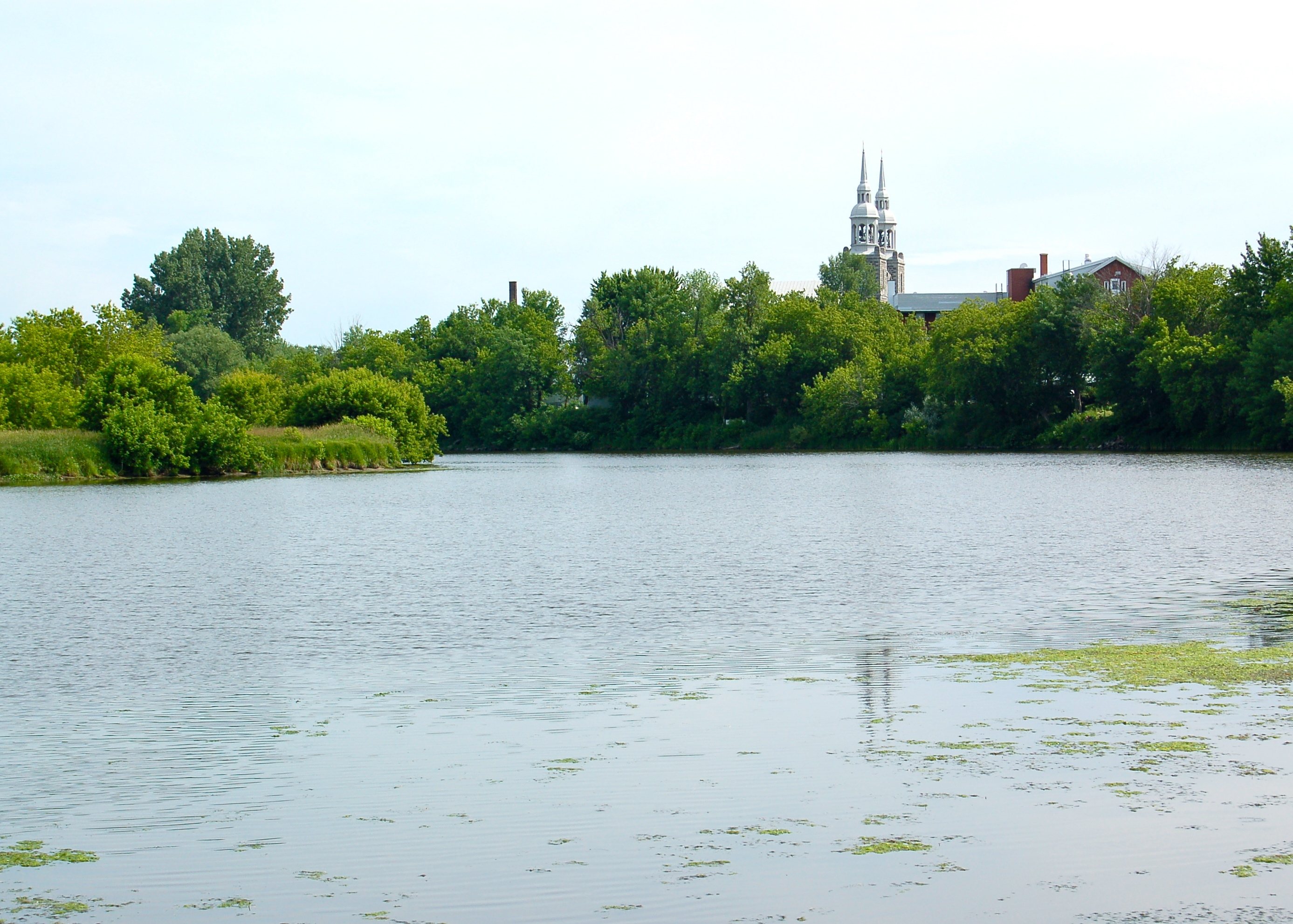
Châteauguay River with Parish of Sainte Martine Church in distance

== Local government ==
List of former mayors:

- James Perrigo (1845–1847)
- Marc Antoine Primo (1855–1856)
- François Gagné (1856–1860)
- Joseph Taillefer (1860–1862)
- James Wight (1862–1864)
- Charles Mentor Lebrun (1864–1866)
- James McGowan (1866–1875)
- Jean Baptiste Eustache Bergevin dit Langevin (1875–1877, 1880–1883)
- Antonin Hébert (1877–1878)
- Philémon Laberge (1878–1880)
- Jesephat Hébert (1883–1885)
- Médard Cardinal (1885–1887)
- Joseph Hébert (1887–1889)
- Jean-Baptiste Roy (1889–1893)
- Edouard McGowan (1893–1906)
- Joseph Théodore Breault (1906–1907)
- Hospice Desrosiers (1907–1909, 1910–1912)
- Hilaire Bonnier (1909–1910)
- Barnabé Laberge (1912–1914, 1933–1937)
- François Xavier Morand (1914–1915)
- Narcisse Vinette (1915–1916)
- Charles Ulric Bergevin (1916–1917)
- Arthur Laberge (1917–1919)
- Albert Desrosiers (1919–1921)
- Ulric Archambault (1921)
- Louis-Philippe Chaput (1921–1931)
- Nolasque April (1931–1933)
- Joseph-Albert Poupart (1937–1941)
- Wilfrid Morand (1941–1943)
- Arthur Mallette (1943–1944)
- Léo Chèvrefils (1944–1951)
- Léo Desparois (1951–1954)
- Aldéo Huot (1954–1960)
- Edouard Lefort (1960–1965)
- Ronaldo Bélanger (1965–1971)
- Jean-Claude Desgroseilliers (1971–1978)
- Paul-Émile Dionne (1978–1985)
- Joseph-Léo-Gilles-Roméo Myre (1985–1993)
- François Candau (1993–2013)
- Éric Brault (2013–2014)
- Jean-Denis Barbeau (interim 2014)
- Maude Laberge (2014–2021)
- Mélanie Lefort (2021–present)

== Transportation ==
The Exo du Haut-Saint-Laurent sector provides commuter and local bus services.

== See also ==
- Châteauguay River
- Rivière de l'Esturgeon (Châteauguay River)
- List of municipalities in Quebec
