= Quebec Route 138 =

Highway in Quebec

Route 138
- Chemin Du Roy
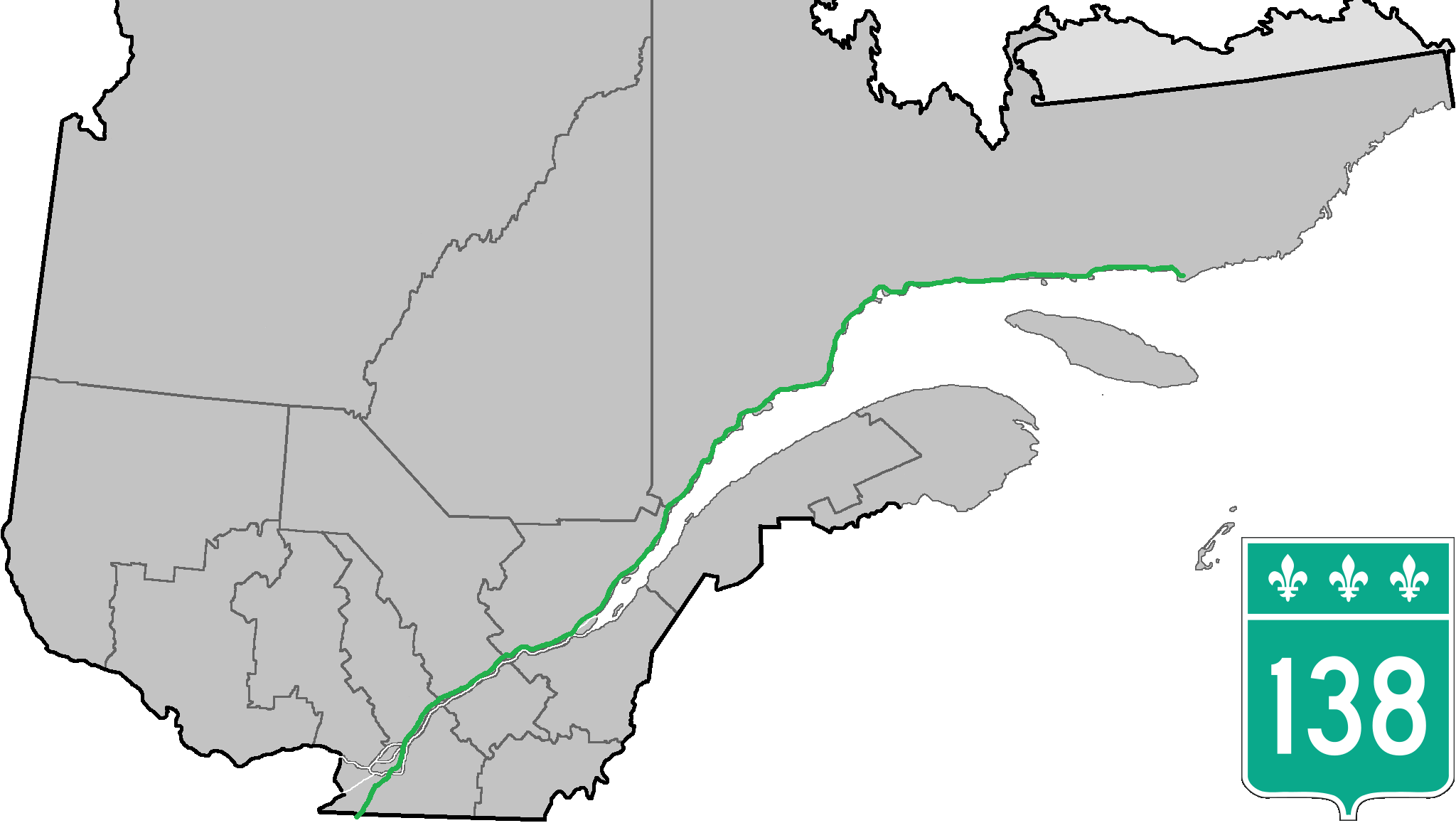

Route information
- Maintained by Transports Québec
- Length: 1,420 km (880 mi)
- History: Route 2 (Montreal – Quebec City); Route 2C (through Quebec City); Route 4 (U.S. border – Montreal); Route 15 (Quebec City – Baie-Comeau)

Major junctions
- West end: NY 30 at the U.S. border in Constable, NY
- A-30 / R-132 in Châteauguay; A-20 in Montreal; A-15 in Montreal; R-112 / R-134 / R-125 in Montreal; A-25 (TCH) in Montreal; A-640 in Repentigny; A-40 / A-55 / R-157 in Trois-Rivières; A-740 / A-973 / R-175 in Quebec City; A-440 in Quebec City; R-389 in Baie-Comeau
- East end: Route 510 east of Blanc Sablon

Location
- Country: Canada
- Province: Quebec
- Major cities: Montréal, Trois-Rivières, Quebec City

Highway system
- Quebec provincial highways; Autoroutes; List; Former
← R-137	→ R-139

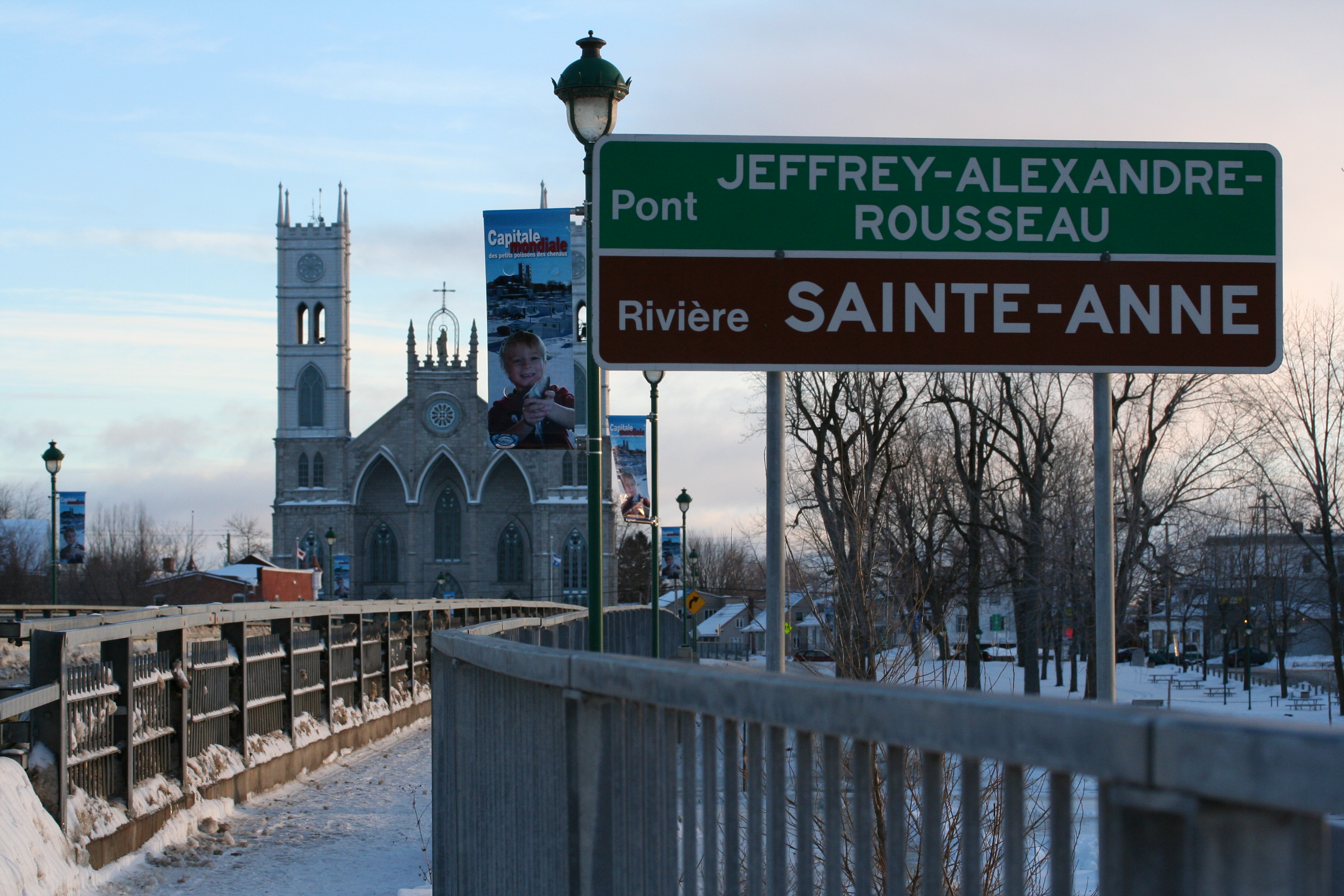
Crossing Sainte-Anne-de-la-Pérade (Chemin du Roy)

Route 138 is a major highway in the Canadian province of Quebec, following the entire north shore of the St. Lawrence River past Montreal to the temporary eastern terminus in Kegashka on the Gulf of St. Lawrence. The western terminus is in Elgin, at the border with New York State south-west of Montreal (connecting with New York State Route 30 at the Trout River Border Crossing). Part of this highway is known as the Chemin du Roy, or King's Highway, which is one of the oldest highways in Canada. It is also the second longest highway in all of Quebec. The longest in Quebec is Route 132.

It passes through the Montérégie, Montreal, Lanaudière, Mauricie, Capitale-Nationale and Côte-Nord regions of Quebec. In Montreal, Highway 138 runs via Sherbrooke Street, crosses the Pierre Le Gardeur Bridge to Charlemagne and remains a four-lane road until exiting Repentigny.

This highway takes a more scenic route than the more direct Autoroute 40 between Montreal and Quebec City. It crosses the Saguenay River via a ferry which travels between Baie-Sainte-Catherine and Tadoussac; in the event of a closure of this ferry, drivers must take a significant detour via Quebec Route 172 and Quebec Route 170 to the city of Saguenay in order to cross the river by bridge.

== The Whale Route ==
From Tadoussac to Blanc-Sablon, at the beginning of the 20th century, the first routes of what would become Route 138 (formerly Route 15) were laid in the vicinity of Sept-Îles. In 1961, a section was added from the Franquelin region to the tip of the Moisie River, some 20 kilometres (12 miles) east of Sept-Îles.

On the north shore of the Gulf of St. Lawrence, until 1976, there was no continuous route to go further east than the Moisie River. Only bits of paths here and there connect a few coastal villages to each other, Natashquan connects to Aguanish by a dirt road (1959).

Route 138, from Tadoussac to Havre-Saint-Pierre, opened in the spring of 1976, from there access to the islands of the Mingan Archipelago by sea.

In 1984, to commemorate the 450th anniversary of Jacques Cartier's arrival in New France, the Commission de toponymie gave this name to the part of Route 138 located east of the Saguenay River, that is, the part that extends from Tadoussac to Havre-Saint-Pierre.

The Whale route - Route Jacques-Cartier - Route 138 East 1976

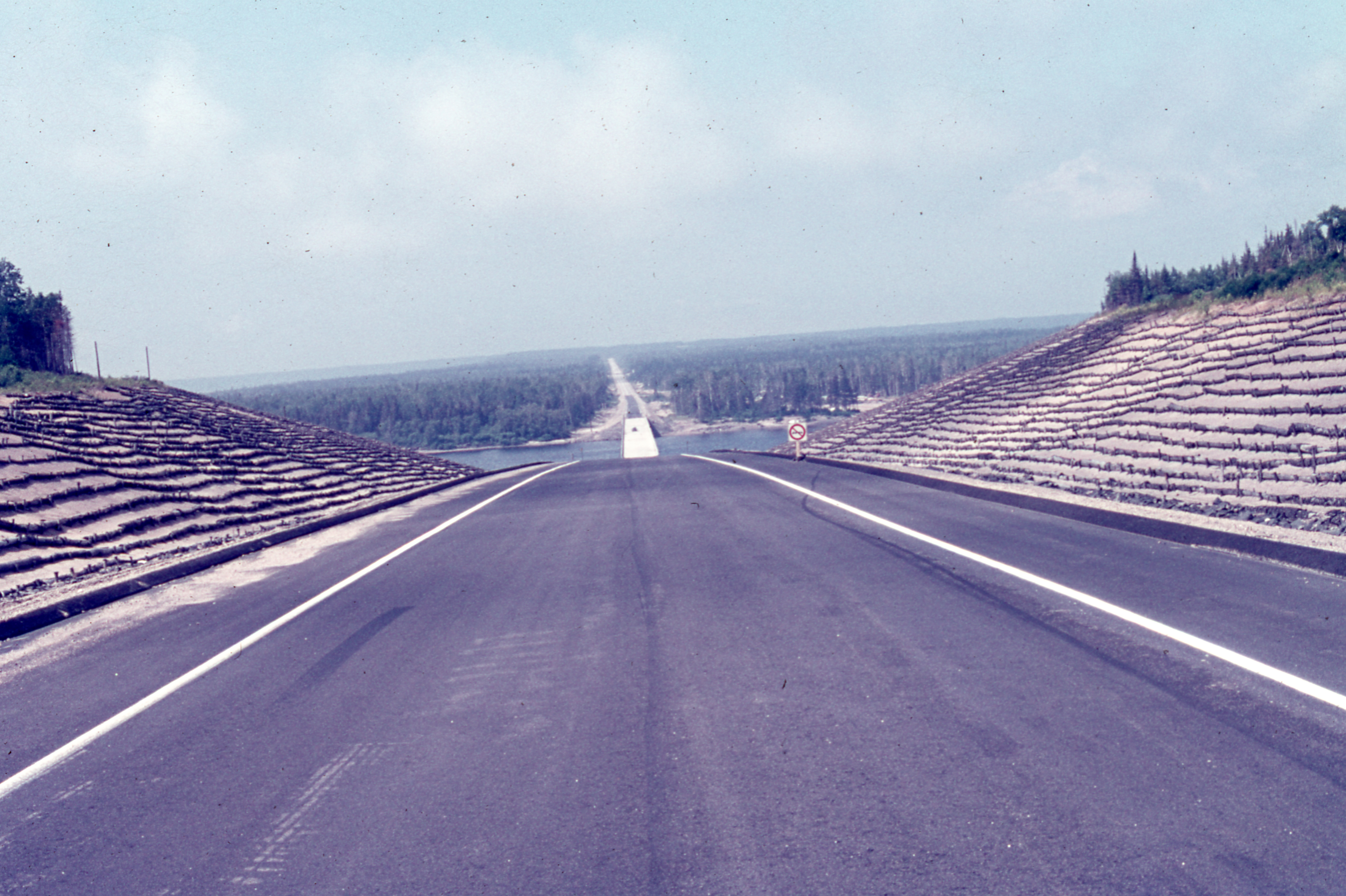
Donald-Gallienne bridge over the Moisie River, Sept-Iles (City), Matamec Hamlet, towards Moisie

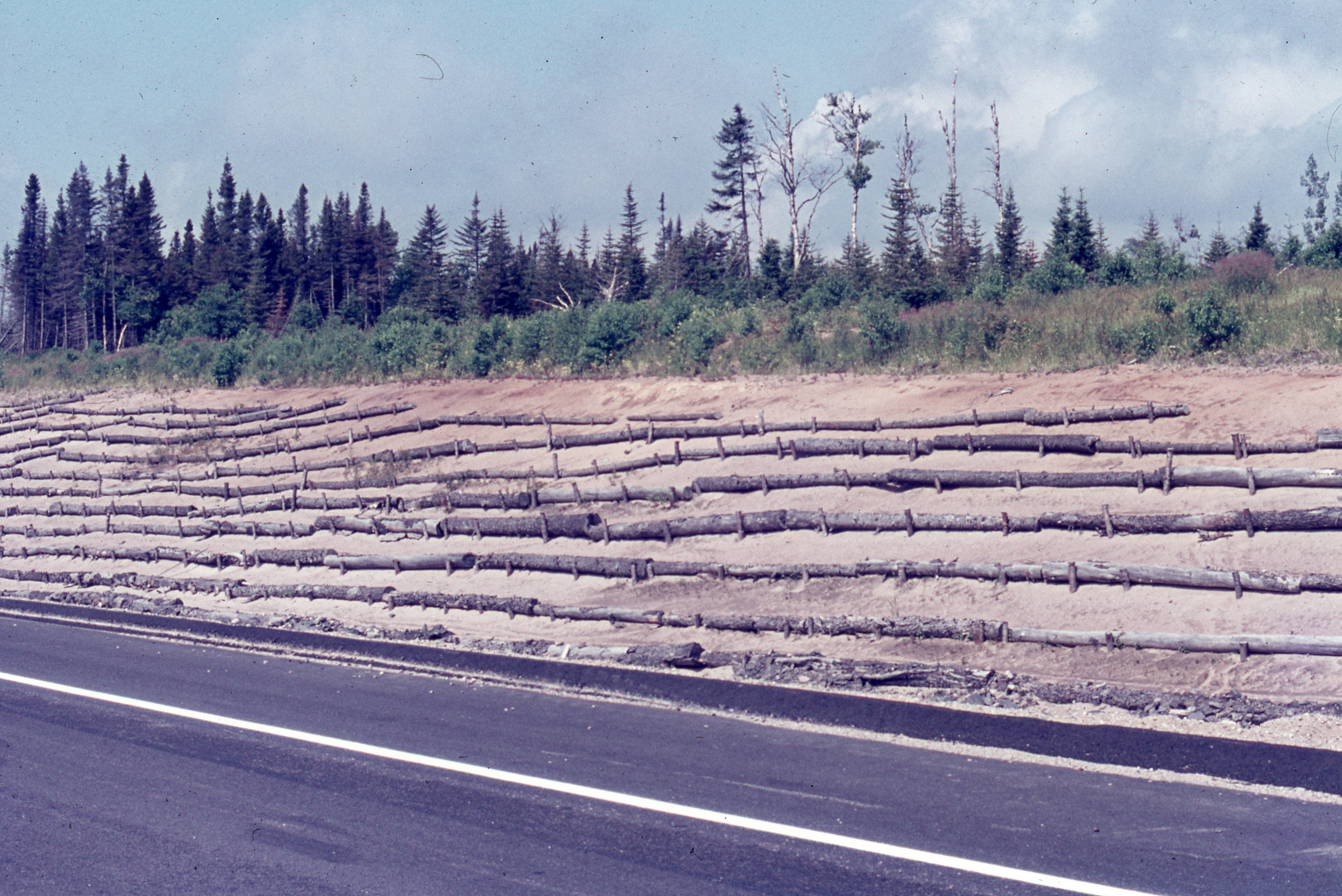
Fill of Highway No. 138, Sept-Îles (City), Hamlet Matamec

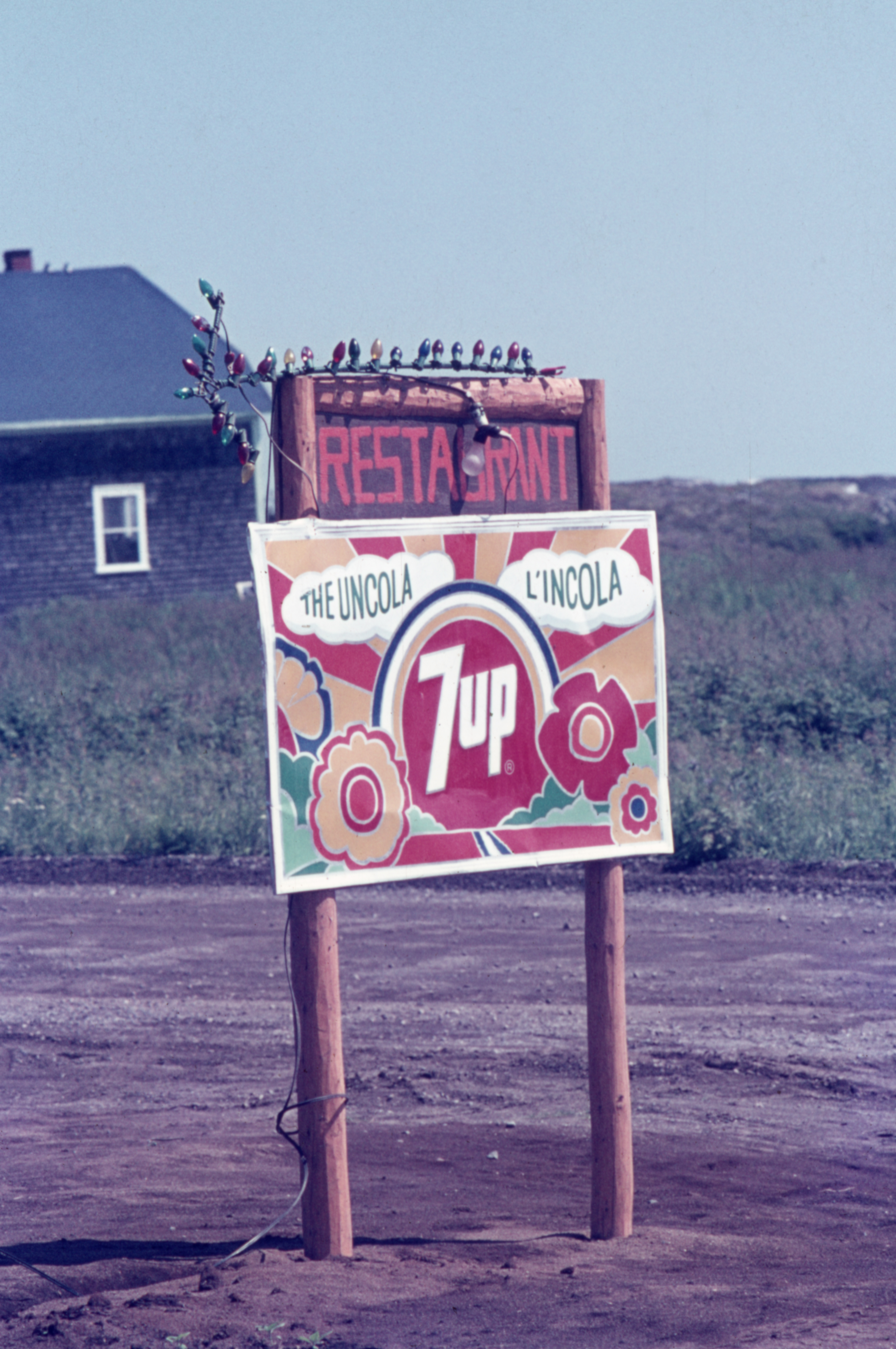
Roadside restaurant sign

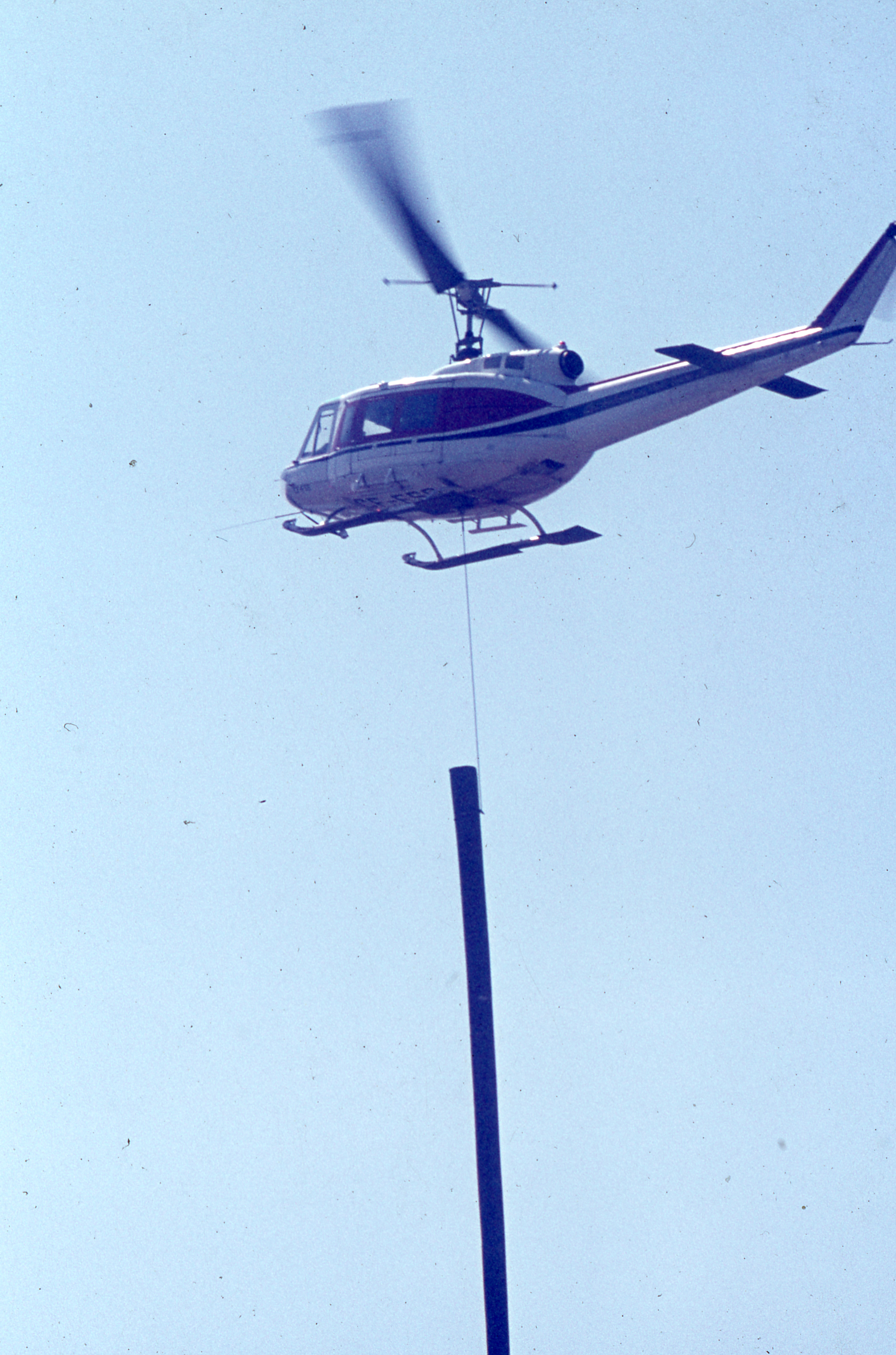
Pole transport by helicopter

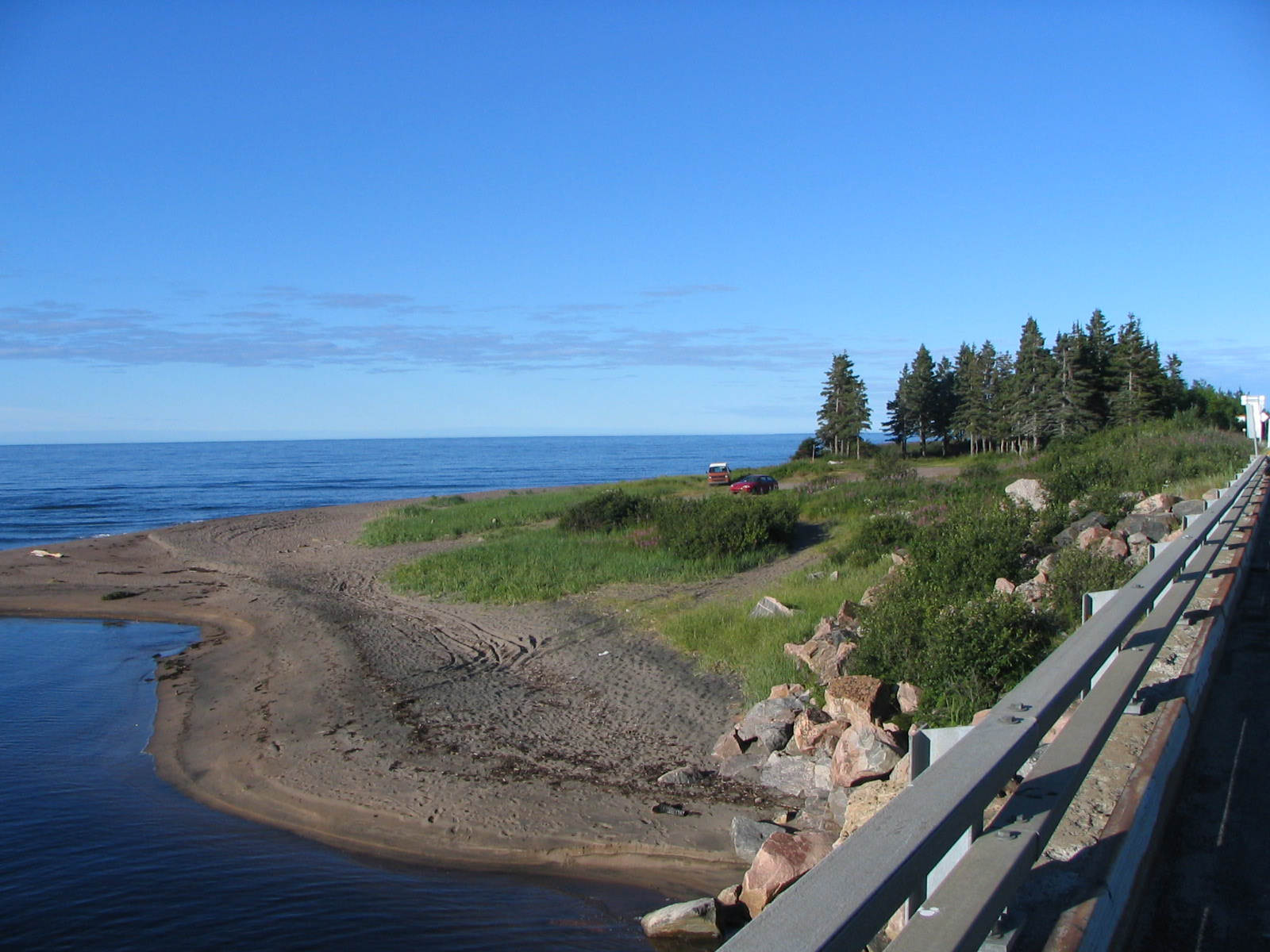
Mouth of the Bouleau River, rest area, from the bridge 14468, Rivière-au-Tonnerre

== From Havre-Saint-Pierre to Natashquan ==
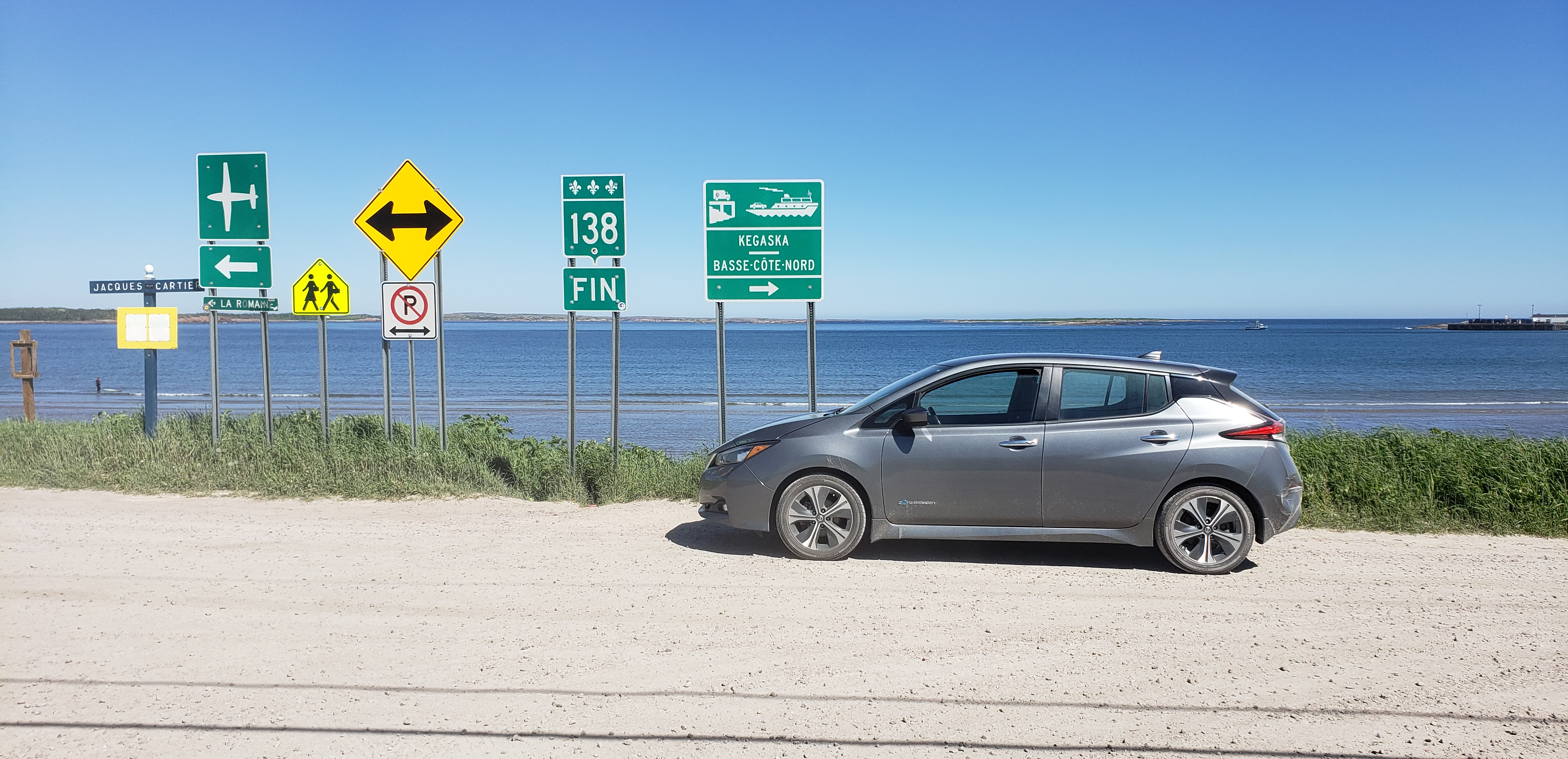
Since 2013, motorists can reach the small village of Kegaska, the westernmost village of the Lower North Shore.

Until the mid-1990s, the highway's eastern terminus was Havre-Saint-Pierre, but in 1996 the extension to Natashquan was completed. A 40 km (25 mile) gravel section between Natashquan and Kegaska opened on September 26, 2013, with the inauguration of a bridge across the Natashquan River.

When planning Route 138, from Havre-Saint-Pierre to the Pashashibou River, the Quebec Ministry of Transport planned the installation of lookouts. Visual openness, proximity to an exceptional landscape, educational potential, as well as a tourist vocation play a determining role in the choice of sites.

The arrangement of lookouts invites travelers to stop in safe observation places, close to the road, preferably elevated and exposed to the winds to avoid the presence of insects.

Over the 150.5 km (93½ miles) that separate Havre-Saint-Pierre and Pashashibou River, Route 138 offers visual openings towards the Gulf of St. Laurent, Pontbriand River, the villages of Baie-Johan-Beetz and Natashquan, etc.

A second segment of about 17 km (10 miles) extends from Tête-à-la-Baleine's airport, east through Tête-à-la-Baleine, to the ferry terminal southeast of Tête-à-la-Baleine. There is also a 10.7 km (6¾ mile) roadway, la route Mecatina, from Mutton Bay to a ferry terminal in La Tabatière and continuing beyond.

A third segment of Route 138 extends from Old Fort to the Newfoundland and Labrador border (connecting with Newfoundland and Labrador Provincial Route 510), near Blanc-Sablon on the eastern end of the Côte-Nord.

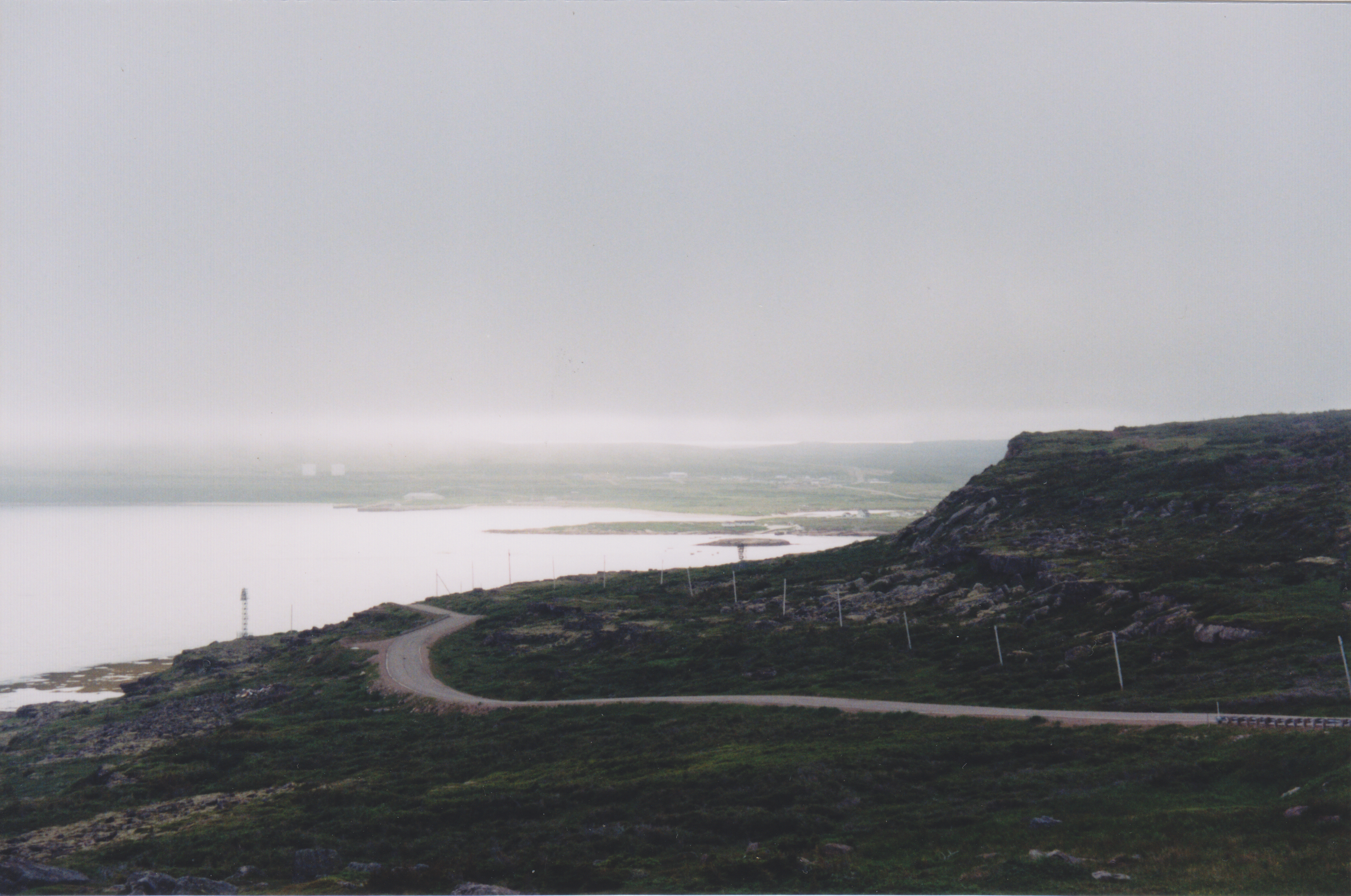
Strait of Belle Isle, Bvrd. Docteur-Camille-Marcoux, Route 138), Blanc Sablon

Blanc-Sablon is located on the north coast of the Gulf of St. Lawrence near the entrance of the Strait of Belle Isle.

A gap remains between Kegaska and Old Fort, through isolated communities accessible only by coastal ferry. On August 25, 2006, the Quebec government announced a 10-year project to connect the two segments by building 425 km (265 miles) of highway along the Lower North Shore. In 2011, the Quebec government announced an additional $122 million investment for the project over five years as part of the Plan Nord. However, by 2013 difficulties ensued between the Quebec Ministry of Transport and the Pakatan Corporation, who was previously responsible for managing the funding for this project, leading to the termination of agreement between the two. By this time only 12 km (7 miles) of this road had been built, plus some additional engineering work and deforestation. The construction of two segments of the highway (Kegaska–La Romaine and Tête-à-la-Baleine–La Tabatière) was set to begin in 2019. A total of $232 million will be contributed to this project. In 2024 the province awarded contracts for engineering and construction of the route and bridges for the road segment between Kegaska and La Romaine.

== Municipalities along Route 138 ==
- Elgin
- Godmanchester
- Huntingdon
- Ormstown
- Très-Saint-Sacrement
- Howick
- Sainte-Martine
- Mercier
- Châteauguay
- Kahnawake
- Montreal
- Montreal-Ouest
- Westmount
- Montréal-Est
- Repentigny
- Saint-Sulpice
- Lavaltrie
- Lanoraie
- Sainte-Geneviève-de-Berthier
- Berthierville
- Saint-Cuthbert
- Saint-Barthélemy
- Maskinongé
- Louiseville
- Yamachiche
- Trois-Rivières
- Champlain
- Batiscan
- Sainte-Anne-de-la-Pérade
- Deschambault-Grondines
- Portneuf
- Cap-Santé
- Donnacona
- Neuville
- Saint-Augustin-de-Desmaures
- Quebec City
- L'Ancienne-Lorette
- L'Ange-Gardien
- Château-Richer
- Sainte-Anne-de-Beaupré
- Beaupré
- Saint-Joachim
- Saint-Tite-des-Caps
- Petite-Rivière-Saint-François
- Baie-Saint-Paul
- Saint-Urbain
- Saint-Hilarion
- La Malbaie
- Saint-Aimé-des-Lacs
- Clermont
- Saint-Siméon
- Baie-Sainte-Catherine

Ferry to 138 continuation in Tadoussac

- Tadoussac
- Sacré-Coeur
- Les Bergeronnes
- Les Escoumins
- Longue-Rive
- Portneuf-sur-Mer
- Forestville
- Colombier
- Pessamit
- Ragueneau
- Chute-aux-Outardes
- Pointe-aux-Outardes
- Pointe-Lebel
- Baie-Comeau
- Franquelin
- Godbout
- Baie-Trinité
- Port-Cartier
- Sept-Îles
- Uashat
- Maliotenam
- Rivière-au-Tonnerre
- Rivière-Saint-Jean
- Longue-Pointe-de-Mingan
- Mingan
- Havre-Saint-Pierre
- Baie-Johan-Beetz
- Aguanish
- Natashquan
- Nutashkuan
- Côte-Nord-du-Golfe-du-Saint-Laurent

gap in roadway

- Bonne-Espérance
- Blanc Sablon

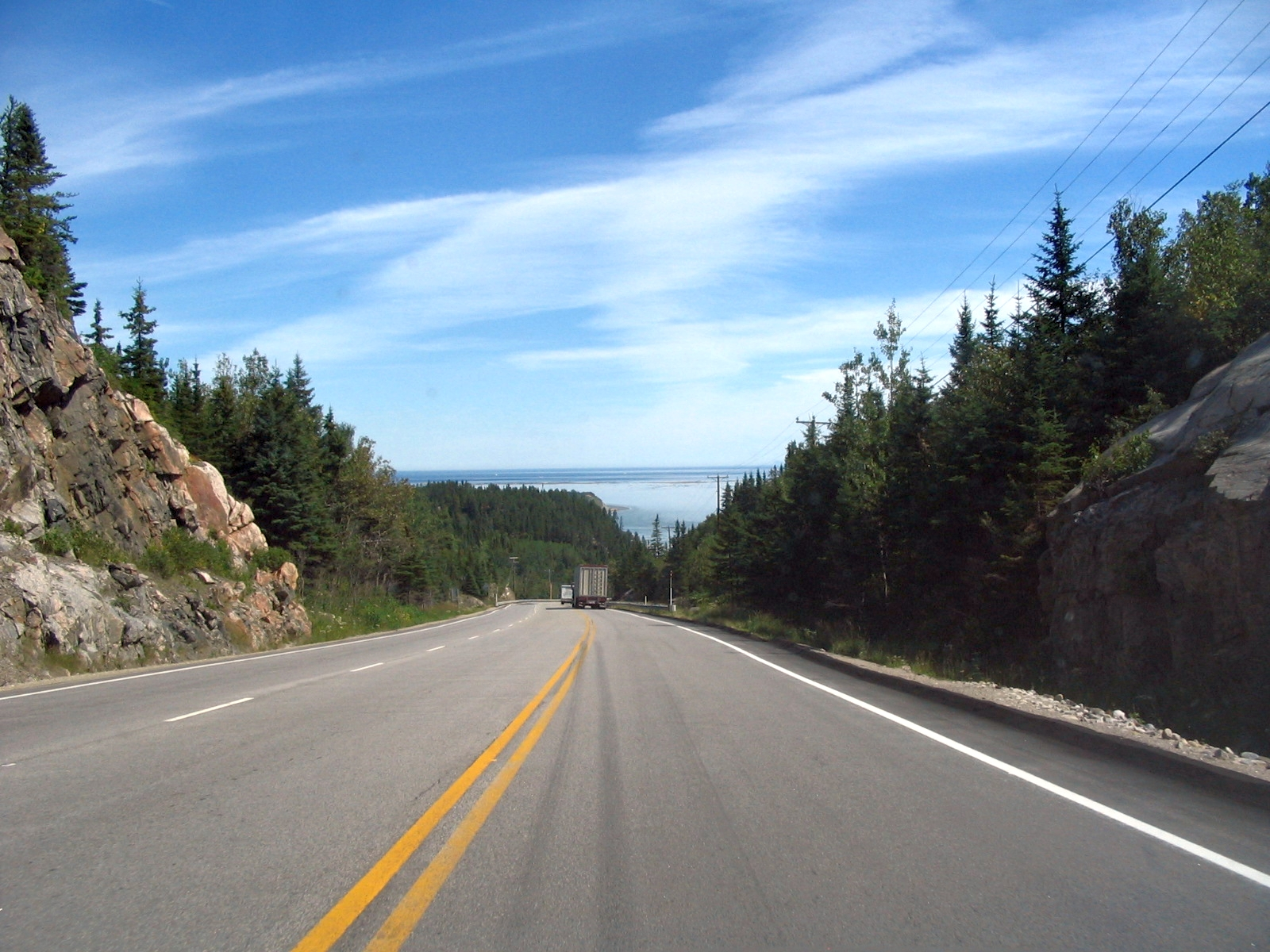
Route 138 in the Charlevoix region.

== Major intersections ==
RCM	Location	km	mi	Exit	Destinations	Notes
Le Haut-Saint-Laurent	Elgin	0.0	0.0		NY 30 south – Malone	Continues into New York
Le Haut-Saint-Laurent	Elgin	0.0	0.0	Canada–United States border at Trout River Border Crossing		
Le Haut-Saint-Laurent	Huntingdon	17.8	11.1		R-202 east (Rue Henderson) – Hinchinbrooke, Franklin	West end of R-202 concurrency
Le Haut-Saint-Laurent	Huntingdon	18.1	11.2		R-202 west – Sainte-Barbe, Salaberry-de-Valleyfield	East end of R-202 concurrency
Le Haut-Saint-Laurent	Ormstown	32.8	20.4		R-201 north – Ormstown	West end of R-201 concurrency
Le Haut-Saint-Laurent	Ormstown	34.0	21.1		R-201 south – Franklin	East end of R-202 concurrency
Le Haut-Saint-Laurent	Très-Saint-Sacrement	51.0	31.7		R-203 south – Saint-Chrysostome	Northern terminus of R-203
Beauharnois-Salaberry	Sainte-Martine	56.2	34.9		R-205 south (Rue Hébert) – Saint-Urbain-Premier	West end of R-205 concurrency
Beauharnois-Salaberry	Sainte-Martine	57.3	35.6		R-205 north (Chemin de la Beauce) – Beauharnois	East end of R-205 concurrency
Roussillon	Mercier–Châteauguay boundary	67.8	42.1		A-30 – Vaudreuil-Dorion, Sorel-Tracy; R-132 west (Boulevard René-Lévesque) – Léry	A-30 exit 38; west end of R-132 concurrency
Kahnawake		76.2	47.3	–	R-207 south / R-221 south – Kahnawake, Saint-Isidore, Saint-Rémi	Interchange; northern terminus of R-207 & R-221
Kahnawake		77.2	48.0	–	R-132 east to A-30 / A-15 – La Prairie	Interchange; east end of R-132 concurrency
St. Lawrence River		77.5– 79.1	48.2– 49.2	Pont Honoré-Mercier (Honoré Mercier Bridge)		
Montréal	Montréal	79.3	49.3	1	Rue Airlie	Interchange; eastbound exit and westbound entrance
Montréal	Montréal	80.4	50.0	2	Rue Clément, Rue St-Patrick	Interchange
Montréal	Montréal	81.3	50.5	4 63	A-20 west (Autoroute du Souvenir) / 1^{re} Avenue – P.-E.-Trudeau International Airport, Dorval	Interchange; west end of A-20 concurrency; exit numbers follow A-20
Montréal	Montréal	82.5	51.3	65	A-20 east – Montréal Centre-Ville	Interchange; east end of A-20 concurrency; R-138 follows Rue Saint-Jacques
Montréal	Montréal	84.0	52.2		Boulevard Cavendish / Rue Saint-Jacques	R-138 follows Boulevard Cavendish
Montréal	Montréal	84.1	52.3		Boulevard De Maisonneuve	Interchange; westbound exit and eastbound entrance
Montréal	Montréal	84.4	52.4		Rue Sherbrooke / Boulevard Cavendish	R-138 follows Rue Sherbrooke
Montréal	Montréal	86.2	53.6		A-15 (Autoroute Décarie)	A-15 exit 64
Montréal	Montréal	90.4	56.2		Rue Peel (R-112 east)	Western terminus of R-112
Montréal	Montréal	92.2	57.3		Rue Saint-Denis (R-335 north)	Southern terminus of R-335
Montréal	Montréal	92.4	57.4		Rue Berri	Interchange; free-flow on Rue Berri
Montréal	Montréal	93.5	58.1		Avenue Papineau (R-134 south)	One-way pair; northern terminus of R-134
Montréal	Montréal	93.8	58.3		Avenue De Lorimier (R-134 north)	One-way pair; northern terminus of R-134
Montréal	Montréal	96.6	60.0		Boulevard Pie-IX (R-125 north)	Southern terminus of R-125
Montréal	Montréal	101.1	62.8		A-25 (TCH) (Autoroute Louis-H.-La Fontaine)	A-25 exit 5
Montréal	Montréal	109.6	68.1		Boulevard Henri-Bourassa	At-grade; westbound exit and eastbound entrance
Montréal	Montréal	113.9	70.8		Rue Notre-Dame	Roundabout; R-138 follows Rue Notre-Dame
Rivière des Prairies		114.1– 115.8	70.9– 72.0	Pont Le Gardeur (Le Gardeur Bridge)		
L'Assomption	Repentigny	116.0	72.1		To R-344 / A-640 / Boulevard Notre-Dame-des-Champs	
L'Assomption	Saint-Sulpice	129.5	80.5		R-343 north to A-40 – L'Assomption	Southern terminus of R-343
D'Autray	Lavaltrie	141.1	87.7		R-131 north (Rue Saint-Antoine) to A-31 – Joliette	Southern terminus of R-131
D'Autray	Berthierville	165.4	102.8		R-158 west (Avenue Gilles-Villeneuve) – Sainte-Geneviève-de-Berthier	West end of R-158 concurrency
D'Autray	Berthierville	166.5	103.5		R-158 east (Rue de Bienville) – La Visitation-de-l'Île-Dupas	East end of R-158 concurrency
D'Autray	Berthierville	172.3	107.1		A-40 – Montreal, Trois-Rivières	A-40 exit 151
Maskinongé	Louiseville	192.3	119.5		R-348 west (Chemin de la Grande-Carrière) – Saint-Édouard-de-Maskinongé	Eastern terminus of R-348
Maskinongé	Louiseville	193.4	120.2		R-349 north (Rue Notre-Dame) – Saint-Léon-le-Grand	Southern terminus of R-349
Maskinongé	Louiseville	198.2	123.2		To A-40 – Montreal, Trois-Rivières	A-40 exit 174
Maskinongé	Yamachiche	202.8	126.0		R-153 (Boulevard Duchesne) – Saint-Barnabér	
Trois-Rivières		211.6	131.5		A-40 – Montreal, Trois-Rivières	A-40 exit 187
Trois-Rivières		224.5	139.5		A-55 to A-40 – Pont Laviolette, Shawinigan, Montreal, Quebec	A-55 exit 181
Trois-Rivières		227.2	141.2		Boulevard de la Commune / Rue Royale	Rond-point de la Couronne (Crown Roundabout); R-138 follows Rue Royale
Trois-Rivières		227.8	141.5		Rue De La Vérendrye	West end of one-way pair; eastbound follows Rue De La Vérendrye & Rue Notre-Dame Centre; westbound follows Rue Royale
Trois-Rivières		229.3	142.5		Rue Laviolette / Rue Royale	East end of one-way pair; R-138 follows Rue Laviolette
Trois-Rivières		231.1	143.6	Pont Duplessis (Duplessis Bridge; west segment) crosses Rivière Saint-Maurice		
Trois-Rivières		231.5	143.8		Île Saint-Christophe	Interchange; access to Île Saint-Quentin and Île Caron
Trois-Rivières		231.7	144.0	Pont Duplessis (Duplessis Bridge; east segment) crosses Rivière Saint-Maurice		
Trois-Rivières		231.9	144.1		Rue Duplessis (R-157 north)	Southern terminus of R-157
Les Chenaux	Champlain	249.7	155.2		R-359 north – Saint-Luc-de-Vincennes	Southern terminus of R-359
Les Chenaux	Batiscan	261.3	162.4		R-361 north – Sainte-Geneviève-de-Batiscan	Southern terminus of R-361
Les Chenaux	Sainte-Anne-de-la-Pérade	269.6	167.5		R-159 north to A-40 – Saint-Prosper-de-Champlain	Southern terminus of R-159
Portneuf	Deschambault-Grondines	290.3	180.4		R-363 north to A-40 – Saint-Marc-des-Carrières	Southern terminus of R-363
Portneuf	Cap-Santé	309.9	192.6		R-358 north to A-40 – Pont-Rouge	Western terminus of R-358
Portneuf	Cap-Santé	314.4	195.4		To A-40 / 2^{e} Rang / Rue de l'Église – Quebec, Montreal	A-40 exit 274
Portneuf	Neuville	323.0	200.7		R-365 north to A-40 – Pont-Rouge	Southern terminus of R-365
Québec	Saint-Augustin-de-Desmaures	338.0	210.0		R-367 north to A-40 – Sainte-Catherine-de-la-Jacques-Cartier	Southern terminus of R-367
Québec	Saint-Augustin-de-Desmaures–Québec boundary	340.7	211.7		A-40 (Autoroute Félix-Leclerc) – Montreal, Québec	A-40 exit 298; becomes Boulevard Wilfrid-Hamel
Québec	Québec	347.3	215.8		A-540 south (Autoroute Duplessis) / Route de l'Aéroport – Aéroport International Jean-Lesage	Northern terminus of A-540
Québec	Québec	350.0	217.5		A-73 / A-40 (Autoroute Henri-IV) – Pont Pierre-Laporte, Montreal	A-73/A-40 exit 141
Québec	Québec	353.0	219.3		A-740 (Autoroute Robert-Bourassa) to A-440	A-740 exit 7
Québec	Québec	355.5	220.9		Boulevard Pierre-Bertrand (R-358 west)	Eastern terminus of R-358
Québec	Québec	357.3	222.0		A-973 / R-175 (Autoroute Laurentienne) to A-40 – Saguenay, Québec Centre-Ville	A-973/QC 175 exit 4
Québec	Québec	357.8	222.3		Boulevard Wilfrid-Hamel / Avenue Eugène-Lamontagne	R-138 follows Avenue Eugène-Lamontagne; becomes 18^{e} Rue east of 1^{re} Avenue
Québec	Québec	359.9– 360.1	223.6– 223.8		Chemin de la Canardière (R-360 east) / 18^{e} Rue / Boulevard Sainte-Anne	R-138 follows Chemin de la Canardière for 1 block and continues on Boulevard Sainte-Anne; western terminus of R-360
Québec	Québec	362.3	225.1		To A-440 west / Boulevard François-De Laval – Québec Centre-Ville	
Québec	Québec	363.3– 363.8	225.7– 226.1		To A-440 / Rue du Manège / Boulevard des Chutes – Québec Centre-Ville, Sainte-Anne-de-Beaupré	A-440 exit 27
Québec	Québec	367.7	228.5		R-368 east – Île d'Orléans A-40 west to A-440 – Québec Centre-Ville	A-40 exit 325; eastern terminus of A-40; western terminus of R-368
La Côte-de-Beaupré	Sainte-Anne-de-Beaupré	392.8	244.1		R-360 west (Rue de la Visitation)	West end of R-360 concurrency
La Côte-de-Beaupré	Sainte-Anne-de-Beaupré	394.6	245.2		R-360 – Mont-Sainte-Anne, Saint-Ferréol-les-Neiges	Interchange; east end of R-360 concurrency
La Côte-de-Beaupré	Saint-Tite-des-Caps	415.5	258.2		R-360 west – Saint-Ferréol-les-Neiges	Eastern terminus of R-360
Charlevoix	Baie-Saint-Paul	448.6	278.7		R-362 east – Saint-Joseph-de-la-Rive	Interchange; western terminus of R-362
Charlevoix	Baie-Saint-Paul	459.1	285.3		R-381 north – Saguenay	Southern terminus of R-381
Charlevoix-Est	La Malbaie	498.2	309.6		R-362 west – Saint-Joseph-de-la-Rive	Eastern terminus of R-362
Charlevoix-Est	Saint-Siméon	531.2	330.1		Rue du Festival – Saint-Siméon ferry terminal	Ferry connection to Rivière-du-Loup
Charlevoix-Est	Saint-Siméon	531.8	330.4		R-170 west – Saguenay	Eastern terminus of R-170
Saguenay River		568.8	353.4	Tadoudssac–Quebec 138 Ferry; Kilometrage does not include ferry		
La Haute-Côte-Nord	Tadoussac	574.9	357.2		R-172 west – Sacre-Coeur, Saguenay	Eastern terminus of R-172
La Haute-Côte-Nord	Les Escoumins	607.3	377.4		Rue de la Réserve – Les Escoumins ferry terminal	Ferry connection to Trois Pistoles
La Haute-Côte-Nord	Forestville	665.7	413.6		Rue Verreault / 1^{e} Avenue – Forestville ferry terminal	Ferry connection to Rimouski
La Haute-Côte-Nord	Forestville	667.4	414.7		R-385 west – Bersimis-Deux, Bersimis-Un	Eastern terminus of R-385
Manicouagan	Baie-Comeau	765.0	475.3		Avenue Damase-Potvin / Boulevard La Salle – Baie-Comeau ferry terminal	Ferry connection to Matane
Manicouagan	Baie-Comeau	766.6	476.3		R-389 north – Fermont, Terre-Neuve-et-Labrador	Southern terminus of R-389; connects to Trans-Labrador Highway
Manicouagan	Franquelin	804.6– 804.9	500.0– 500.1	Saint-Nicolas Tunnel		
Manicouagan	Godbout	820.5	509.8		Rue Monseigneur-Labrie – Godbout ferry terminal	Ferry connection to Matane
Sept-Rivières	Sept-Îles	942.4	585.6		Rue Retty – Sept-Îles ferry terminal	Ferry connections to Rimouski and Port-Menier
Sept-Rivières	Sept-Îles	950.0	590.3		Sept-Îles Airport	
Minganie	Havre-Saint-Pierre	1,157.6	719.3		Rue de l'Escale – Havre-Saint-Pierre ferry terminal	Ferry connections to Port-Menier and Natashquan
Minganie	Natashquan	1,307.2	812.3		Chemin des Robin – Natashquan ferry terminal	Ferry connections to Havre-Saint-Pierre and Kegaska
Le Golfe-du-Saint-Laurent	Kegashka	1,359.0	844.4		Chemin Jacques-Cartier – Kegaska Airport, Kegaska ferry terminal	Eastern terminus (main section); ferry connections to Natashquan and La Romaine
150 km (95 mi) gap in Route 138
Le Golfe-du-Saint-Laurent	Tête-à-la-Baleine	0.0	0.0		Tête-à-la-Baleine Airport	Western terminus (Tête-à-la-Baleine section)
Le Golfe-du-Saint-Laurent	Tête-à-la-Baleine	17.1	10.6		Tête-à-la-Baleine ferry terminal	Eastern terminus (Tête-à-la-Baleine section); ferry connections to Harrington Harbour and La Tabatière
140 km (85 mi) gap in Route 138
Le Golfe-du-Saint-Laurent	Vieux Fort	0.0	0.0			Western terminus (Vieux Fort–Blanc-Sablon section)
Le Golfe-du-Saint-Laurent	Blanc-Sablon	67.9	42.2		Avenue Jacques-Cartier – Blanc-Sablon ferry terminal	Ferry connections to Saint-Augustin, Corner Brook, St. Barbe, and Route 430
Le Golfe-du-Saint-Laurent	Blanc-Sablon	71.4	44.4		Route 510 east (Trans-Labrador Highway) – L'Anse-au-Clair, Labrador City	Continues into Newfoundland and Labrador; eastern terminus of R-138
1.000 mi = 1.609 km; 1.000 km = 0.621 mi: Concurrency terminus; Incomplete access; Route transition

== Fauna ==
The following animals can be seen along the route:

Cetaceans: Beluga, Minke whale, Fin whale, Porpoise, Blue whale.
Seals: Grey seal, harbour seal, harp seal.

== Projects ==
Several projects are planned, under construction, or under study along Quebec Route 138, particularly on the North Shore.

=== Lower North Shore extension ===
The Government of Quebec has been extending Route 138 along the Lower North Shore to connect communities between Kegaska and Vieux-Fort and reduce their isolation from the rest of Quebec. The unconnected portion between Kegaska and Vieux-Fort is approximately 400 km long.

The section between the Washicoutai River and La Romaine was completed in 2024. The Washicoutai River bridge was completed in 2025, with minor finishing work scheduled for 2026.

Construction between Tête-à-la-Baleine and La Tabatière began in 2024 and is scheduled to continue through autumn 2026. The project includes the construction of a bridge over the Gros Mécatina River in 2026.

The sections between La Romaine and Tête-à-la-Baleine and between La Tabatière and Vieux-Fort remain under study. The opportunity study was completed in 2025, as was an economic study assessing the effects of the proposed extension.

=== Saguenay River crossing ===
Route 138 currently crosses the Saguenay River between Tadoussac and Baie-Sainte-Catherine by ferry. The Government of Quebec is studying the possibility of constructing a permanent bridge between the two communities.

The opportunity study and the socioeconomic study on the effects of a bridge on the Tadoussac–Baie-Sainte-Catherine ferry service have been completed. An international comparative analysis of major bridge projects was underway in 2026. The project remains classified as under study in the Quebec Infrastructure Plan, and further planning is dependent on completion of the analysis and government funding.

=== Tadoussac ferry approach ===
A separate project is planned to redesign Route 138 near the Tadoussac–Baie-Sainte-Catherine ferry terminal. The project is intended to improve traffic flow during vehicle loading and unloading, revise the road configuration and signage, improve road geometry, and replace infrastructure reaching the end of its useful life.

As of 2026, the project was in the preliminary design stage. The concept is being revised because technical studies identified several constraints.

=== Other Route 138 projects ===
The 2026–2036 Quebec Infrastructure Plan also lists the Route 138 section between La Romaine and Tête-à-la-Baleine and the section between La Tabatière and Vieux-Fort as projects under study. It also lists the reconstruction of the Route 138 bridge over the Batiscan River as a project in the planning stage.

== See also ==
- Quebec Route 2 (historical) and Chemin du Roy
- List of Quebec provincial highways
