= Mercier, Quebec =

Mercier
- City
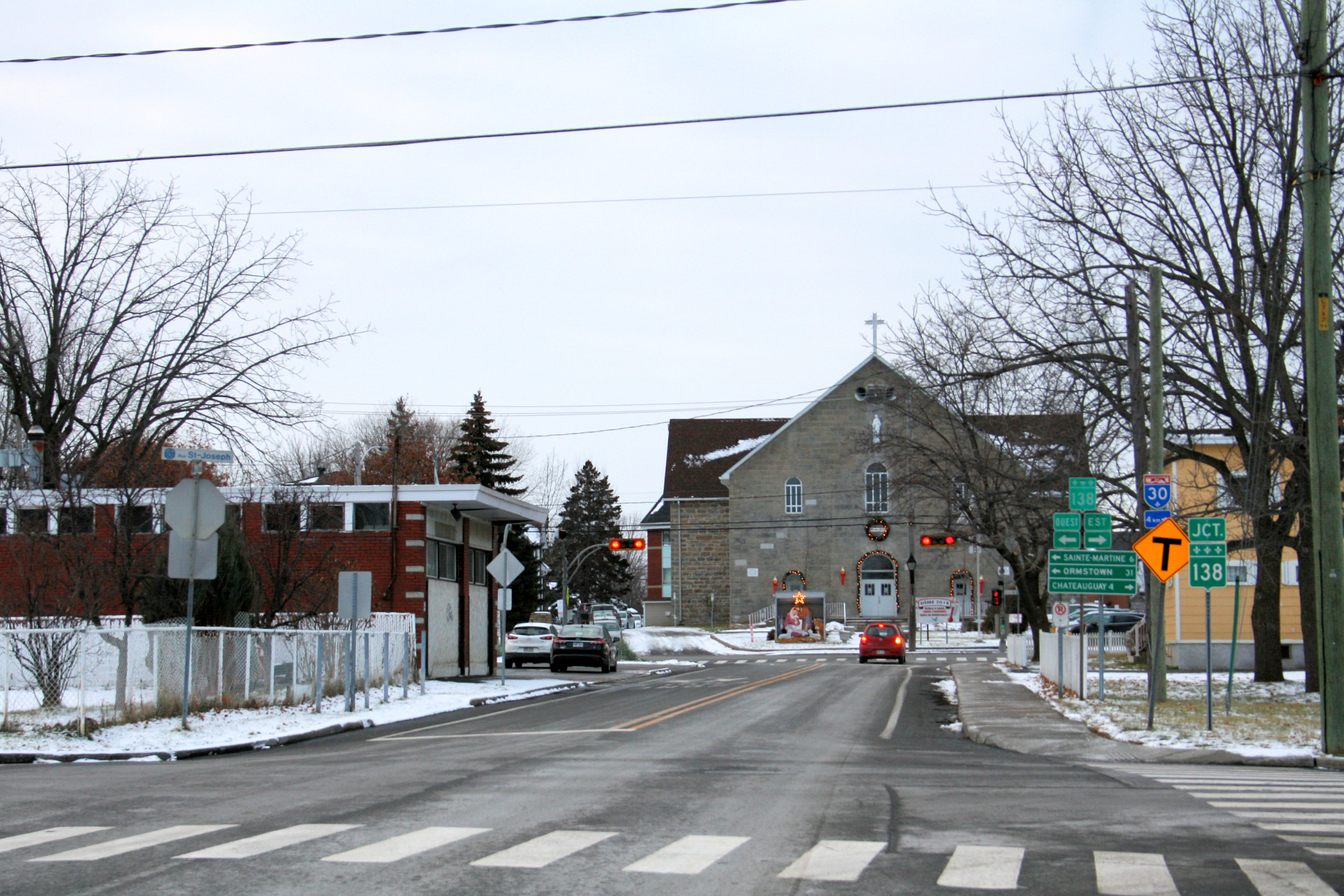
- Rue de l’Eglise in Mercier

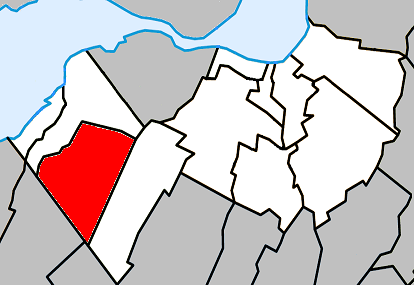
- Location within Roussillon RCM

- Location in southern Quebec
- Coordinates: 45.32°N 73.75°W
- Country: Canada
- Province: Quebec
- Region: Montérégie
- RCM: Roussillon
- Constituted: July 1, 1855

Government
  - Mayor: Lise Michaud
  - Federal riding: Châteauguay—Les Jardins-de-Napierville
  - Prov. riding: Châteauguay

Area
  - Total: 46.60 km^{2} (17.99 sq mi)
  - Land: 45.96 km^{2} (17.75 sq mi)

Population (2021)
  - Total: 14,626
  - Density: 318.2/km^{2} (824/sq mi)
  - Pop 2016-2021: ▲11.5%
  - Dwellings: 5,472
- Time zone: UTC−5 (EST)
  - Summer (DST): UTC−4 (EDT)
- Postal code(s): J6R
- Area codes: 450 and 579
- Highways: R-138
- Website: www.ville.mercier.qc.ca

Mercier (French pronunciation: [mɛʁsje]) is a suburban town in southwestern Quebec, Canada, in the Roussillon Regional County Municipality. It is located on the Châteauguay River, southwest of Montreal. The population as of the Canada 2021 Census was 14,626.

== History ==
Officially founded in 1855, Mercier was formerly called Sainte-Philomène. The name was changed in 1968 in order to pay homage to the former Premier of Quebec, Honoré Mercier, who served from 1887 to 1891. The name change is also due to the proximity to the Honoré Mercier Bridge and also aims to give the city a name that is more marketable and less unpleasant in English.

Moreover, the worship dedicated to Philomena was increasingly uncertain and had survived thanks to the devotion with which it was surrounded in the 19th century. This last reason precipitated the decision to change the name of the city.

The first municipal council was formed in Sainte-Philomène in 1845 and sat, in accordance with the law, for two years, the first mayor of which was Antoine Couillard (1845-1846).

== Demographics ==
Historical Census Data - Mercier, Quebec
Year	Pop.	±%
1991	8,227	—
1996	9,059	+10.1%
2001	9,442	+4.2%
2006	10,121	+7.2%
2011	11,584	+14.5%
2016	13,115	+13.2%
2021	14,626	+11.5%

In the 2021 Census of Population conducted by Statistics Canada, Mercier had a population of 14,626 living in 5,398 of its 5,472 total private dwellings, a change of 11.5% from its 2016 population of 13,115. With a land area of 45.96 km^{2} (17.75 sq mi), it had a population density of 318.2/km^{2} (824.2/sq mi) in 2021.

Canada census – Mercier community profile

	2021	2016	2011
Population	14,626 (+11.5% from 2016)	13,115 (+13.2% from 2011)	11,584 (+14.5% from 2006)
Land area	45.96 km^{2} (17.75 sq mi)	46.08 km^{2} (17.79 sq mi)	45.95 km^{2} (17.74 sq mi)
Population density	318.2/km^{2} (824/sq mi)	284.6/km^{2} (737/sq mi)	252.1/km^{2} (653/sq mi)
Median age	39.2 (M: 39.2, F: 39.2)	38.5 (M: 37.9, F: 39.1)	38.4 (M: 37.7, F: 39.0)
Private dwellings	5,472 (total) 5,398 (occupied)	4,932 (total)	4,454 (total)
Median household income	$100,000	$83,872	$72,966

References: 2021 2016 2011

Canada Census Mother Tongue - Mercier, Quebec
Census	Total	French			English			French & English			Other		
Year	Responses	Count	Trend	Pop %	Count	Trend	Pop %	Count	Trend	Pop %	Count	Trend	Pop %
2021	14,625	12,000	▲5.6%	82.1%	1,040	▲26.8%	7.1%	280	▲100.0%	1.9%	1,135	▲61.0%	7.8%
2016	13,115	11,365	▲10.6%	86.7%	820	▲21.5%	6.3%	140	▲7.7%	1.1%	705	▲60.2%	5.4%
2011	11,525	10,280	▲11.6%	89.20%	675	▲21.6%	5.86%	130	▲188.9%	1.13%	440	▲51.7%	3.82%
2006	10,100	9,210	▲4.2%	91.19%	555	▲50.0%	5.49%	45	▼30.8%	0.45%	290	▲114.8%	2.87%
2001	9,410	8,840	▲8.7%	93.94%	370	▼40.3%	3.93%	65	▲8.3%	0.69%	135	▼32.5%	1.43%
1996	9,015	8,135	n/a	90.24%	620	n/a	6.88%	60	n/a	0.67%	200	n/a	2.22%

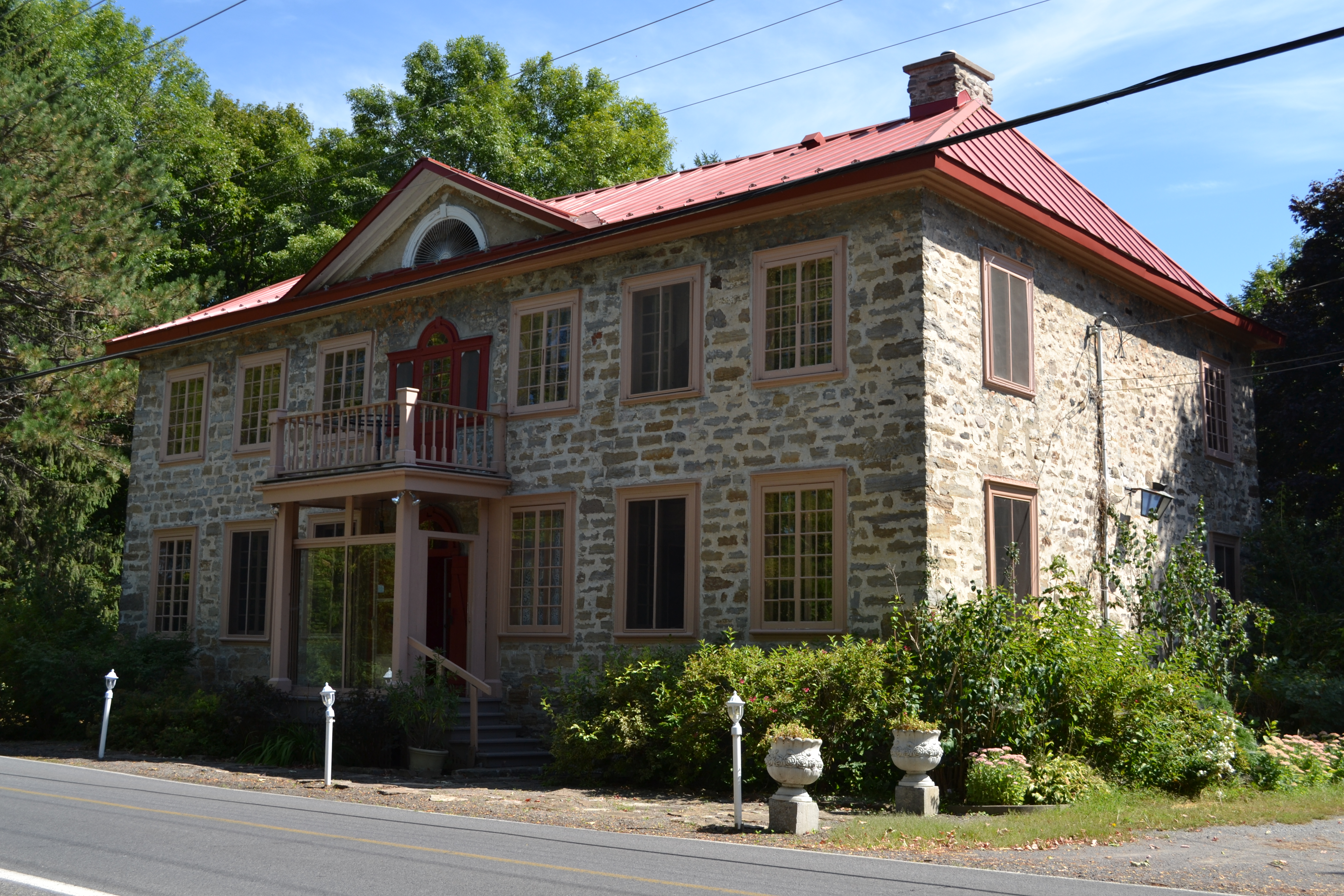
Maison Sauvageau-Sweeny

== Transportation ==
The CIT du Haut-Saint-Laurent provides commuter and local bus services.

== See also ==
- Roussillon Regional County Municipality
- Rivière de l'Esturgeon (Châteauguay River)
- List of cities in Quebec
