= Saint-Rémi, Quebec =

Saint-Rémi
- City
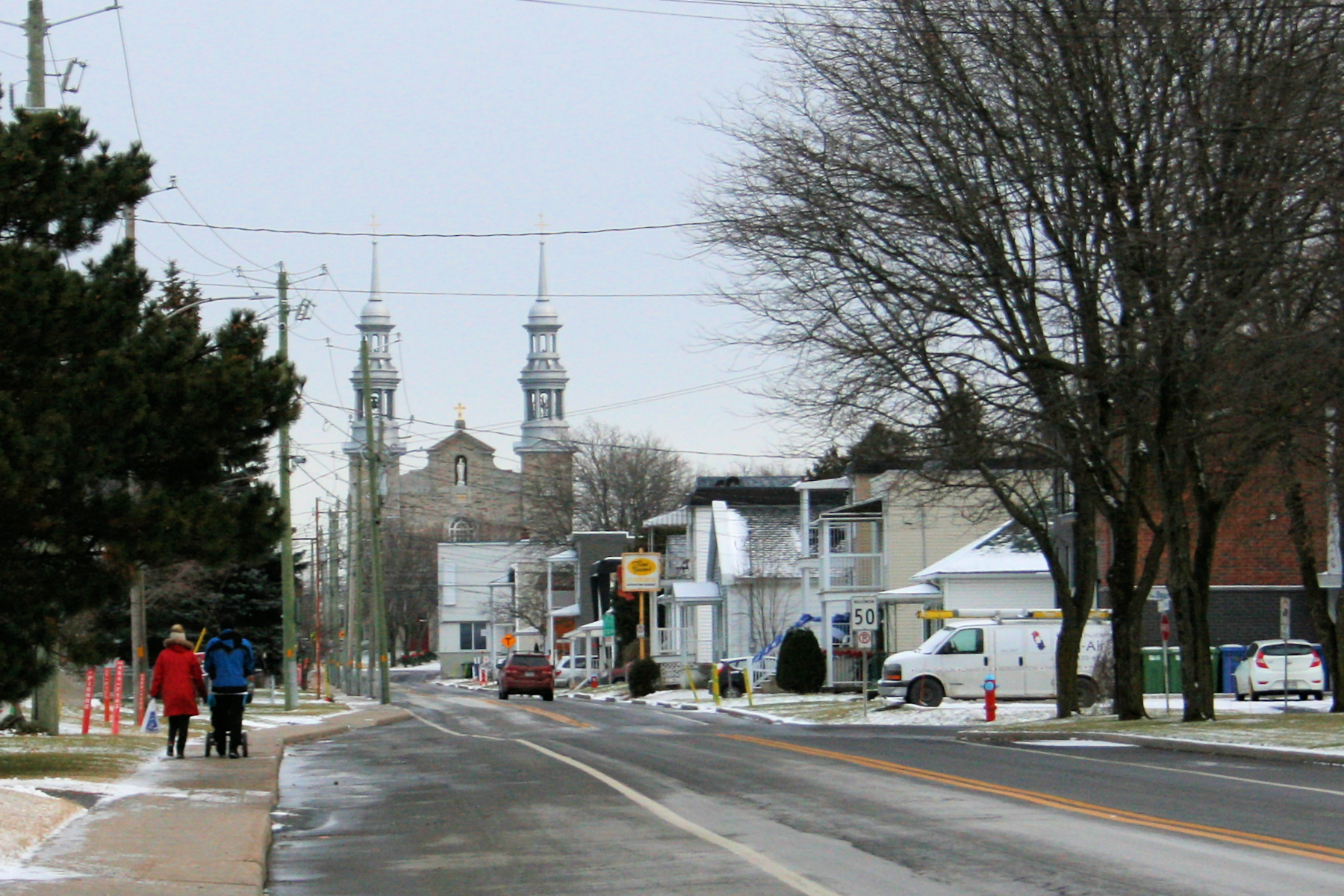
- rue de l'Église in Saint-Rémi

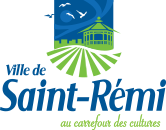
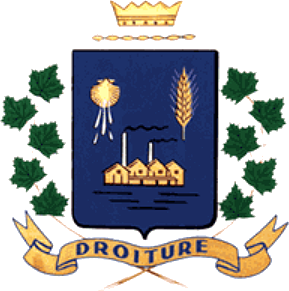
- Flag Coat of arms
- Motto: Droiture (Righteousness)
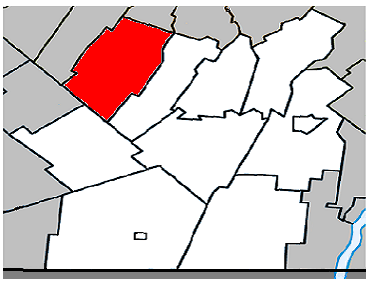
- Location within Les Jardins-de-Napierville RCM

- Location in southern Quebec
- Coordinates: 45°16′N 73°37′W
- Country: Canada
- Province: Quebec
- Region: Montérégie
- RCM: Les Jardins-de-Napierville
- Founded: 1815
- Constituted: 20 September 1975
- Founder: Alexis Perras

Government
  - Mayor: Sylvie Gagnon-Breton
  - Federal riding: Châteauguay—Les Jardins-de-Napierville
  - Prov. riding: Sanguinet

Area
  - Total: 78.8 km^{2} (30.4 sq mi)
  - Land: 78.18 km^{2} (30.19 sq mi)
- Elevation: 60 m (200 ft)

Population (2021)
  - Total: 8,957
  - Density: 114.6/km^{2} (297/sq mi)
  - Pop (2016-21): ▲11.1%
  - Dwellings: 3,796
- Time zone: UTC−5 (EST)
  - Summer (DST): UTC−4 (EDT)
- Postal code(s): J0L
- Area Code: 450 and 579
- Highways: R-209 R-221
- NTS Map: 031H05
- Québec Geocode: 68055
- CLSC Territory: Les Jardins-de-Napierville (16042)
- Website: www.saint-remi.ca

Saint-Rémi (French pronunciation: [sɛ̃ ʁemi]) is a city in the province of Quebec, Canada. Located south of the Saint Lawrence River, Saint-Rémi is part of Les Jardins-de-Napierville Regional County Municipality, in the Montérégie administrative region. The population as of the 2021 Canada Census was 8 957.

== Toponymy ==
The territory was known as Saint-Rémi early into European settlement. It is thought that the name was chosen to honor Daniel de Rémy de Courcelle, Governor General of New France from 1665 to 1672, but this fact is still in doubt today.

== History ==
At the start of the 19th century, Lord Christophe Sanguinet experienced legal disputes with the British colonial administration and after two trials in 1805 and 1807, the territory of the Lordship of La Salle was reduced by 20% of its area, the most developed by being removed. He and his successors, his son Ambroise Sanguinet and his grandsons Christophe-Ambroise and Charles-Amable Sanguinet tried to recover this part of the territory while interceding so that the hundreds of threatened censitaires were not expelled from their lands. Christophe-Ambroise and Charles-Amable Sanguinet took up the cause of the Lower Canada Rebellion and were hanged in 1839.

Saint-Rémi is located in the former seigneury of La Salle and on the former township of Huntigndon. The origin of the name Saint-Rémi comes from Saint Remigius, bishop of Reims, who baptized the king of the Salian Franks Clovis I in 496. It was in 1815 that the first pioneer, Alexis Perras, arrived.

On 1 July 1845, the parish municipality of Saint-Rémi was officially created. Two years later in 1847, it was merged into the newly created Huntingdon County, but this county was dissolved on July 1, 1855, and the parish municipality was reestablished.

On 23 October 1859, the village of Saint-Rémi was formed by detachment from the parish of the same name. On November 19, 1946, it changed statutes to become a ville (city).

In 1975, the municipal councils of the city of Saint-Rémi and the parish of the same name adopted a by-law authorizing the granting of letters patent to merge the two municipalities into one City of Saint-Rémi.

In 2000, following the death and state funeral of Pierre Trudeau, the 15th Prime Minister of Canada and father of 23rd Prime Minister Justin Trudeau, his body was entombed in a family mausoleum located at the city's main cemetery (St-Rémi-de-Napierville Cemetery). The federal government has marked his resting place with an official plaque as part of a program commemorating deceased prime ministers.

== Demographics ==
In the 2021 Census of Population conducted by Statistics Canada, Saint-Rémi had a population of 8,957 living in 3,682 of its 3,796 total private dwellings, a change of 11.1% from its 2016 population of 8,061. With a land area of 78.18 km^{2} (30.19 sq mi), it had a population density of 114.6/km^{2} (296.7/sq mi) in 2021.

Historical Census Data – Saint-Rémi, Quebec

Year	Pop.	±%
1861	1,003	—
1871	831	−17.1%
1881	909	+9.4%
1891	1,167	+28.4%
1901	1,080	−7.5%
1911	1,021	−5.5%
1921	1,135	+11.2%
1931	1,201	+5.8%
1941	1,431	+19.2%

Year	Pop.	±%
1951	1,845	+28.9%
1956	2,303	+24.8%
1961	2,276	−1.2%
1966	2,221	−2.4%
1971	2,282	+2.7%
1976	4,866	+113.2%
1981	5,146	+5.8%
1986	5,288	+2.8%
1991	5,768	+9.1%

Year	Pop.	±%
1991	5,768	+0.0%
1996	5,707	−1.1%
2001	5,736	+0.5%
2006	6,136	+7.0%
2011	7,265	+18.4%
2016	8,061	+11.0%
2021	8,957	+11.1%

Population amounts are not adjusted for boundary changes (in 1975, the city of St-Remi merged with the Parish Municipality of St-Remi.
Source: Statistics Canada

Canada Census Mother Tongue – Saint-Rémi, Quebec
Census	Total	French			English			French & English			Other		
Year	Responses	Count	Trend	Pop %	Count	Trend	Pop %	Count	Trend	Pop %	Count	Trend	Pop %
2021	8,810	8,145	▲5.1%	92.5%	190	▲22.6%	2.2%	125	▲212.5%	1.4%	315	▲103.2%	3.6%
2016	8,061	7,750	▲12.9%	96.1%	155	▲40.9%	1.9%	40	0.00%	0.5%	155	▼11.4%	1.9%
2011	7,185	6,860	▲19.7%	95.5%	110	▲46.7%	1.5%	40	▲300.0%	0.6%	175	▲16.7%	2.4%
2006	5,965	5,730	▲5.5%	96.1%	75	▲7.1%	1.3%	10	▼66.7%	0.2%	150	▲150.0%	2.5%
2001	5,590	5,430	▲0.7%	97.1%	70	▲16.7%	1.3%	30	▲20.0%	0.5%	60	▼50.0%	1.1%
1996	5,595	5,390	n/a	96.3%	60	n/a	1.1%	25	n/a	0.5%	120	n/a	2.1%

== Government ==
List of former mayors:

- André Adolphe Dugast (1859–1862)
- Josephe Hugues Martin (1862–1864)
- Pierre Avila Hogleman (1864–1870, 1877–1879, 1880–1882)
- Antoine Goyer (1870–1872)
- Célestin Eméré Bonneville (1872–1875, 1879–1880)
- Joseph Chéri Fifre (1875–1877, 1883–1884)
- Louis Sainte Marie (1882–1883)
- Laurent Hébert (1884–1885)
- Alexis Bisaillon (1885–1887)
- Célestin Chéri Benoit (1887–1888, 1898–1900)
- André Hébert (1888–1891)
- Julien Longtin (1891–1894)
- Camille Lamare (1894–1896)
- Joseph Adolphe Poirier (1896–1897)
- Jean Baptiste Blain (1897–1898)
- Hugues Alexandre Harkin (1900–1901)
- Joseph Emile Phidime Thérien (1901–1903, 1904–1907)
- Joseph Trudeau (1903–1904, 1925–1926)
- Pierre Bariteau (1907–1908)
- Joseph Théodore Giguère (1908–1909)
- Pierre Gagnon (1909–1910)
- Charles Laporte (1910–1911)
- Flavien Auguste Boucher (1911–1912)
- Aimé Bédard (1912–1913, 1914–1919)
- Joseph Alfred Huberdeault (1913–1914)
- Alexis-Armand-Florian Lamarre (1919–1921)
- Joseph Hilaire Camille Lamare (1921–1925)
- Pierre-André Hébert (1926–1929, 1931–1933)
- Joseph-Alexandre Viau (1929–1931, 1933–1942)
- Joseph Napoléon Lazure (1942–1949)
- Louis Joseph Lazure (1949–1952)
- Joseph François Xavié Myre (1952–1958)
- Joseph Maurice Lemieux (1958–1962)
- Joseph Elphège Maurice Marotte (1962–1964)
- Jean Paul Bernard Ferdais (1964–1969)
- Joseph Gustave Romain Lussier (1969–1975, 1976)
- Joseph Alexandre Claude Dubois (1975–1976)
- Joseph Victor Rosaire Denault (1976–1980)
- Joseph Henri Maurice Wolfe (1980–1988)
- Charles Edouard Jean Vergé (1988–1992)
- Michel Lavoie (1992–2000, 2005–2013)
- Yves Provençal (2000–2005)
- Sylvie Gagnon-Breton (2013–present)

== Notable people ==
- John Cantius Garand (1888-1974), Canadian-American designer of the M1 Garand

== See also ==
- Saint-Pierre River (Saint-Régis River tributary)
- List of cities in Quebec
