= Saint-Isidore, Montérégie, Quebec =

Saint-Isidore
- Parish municipality
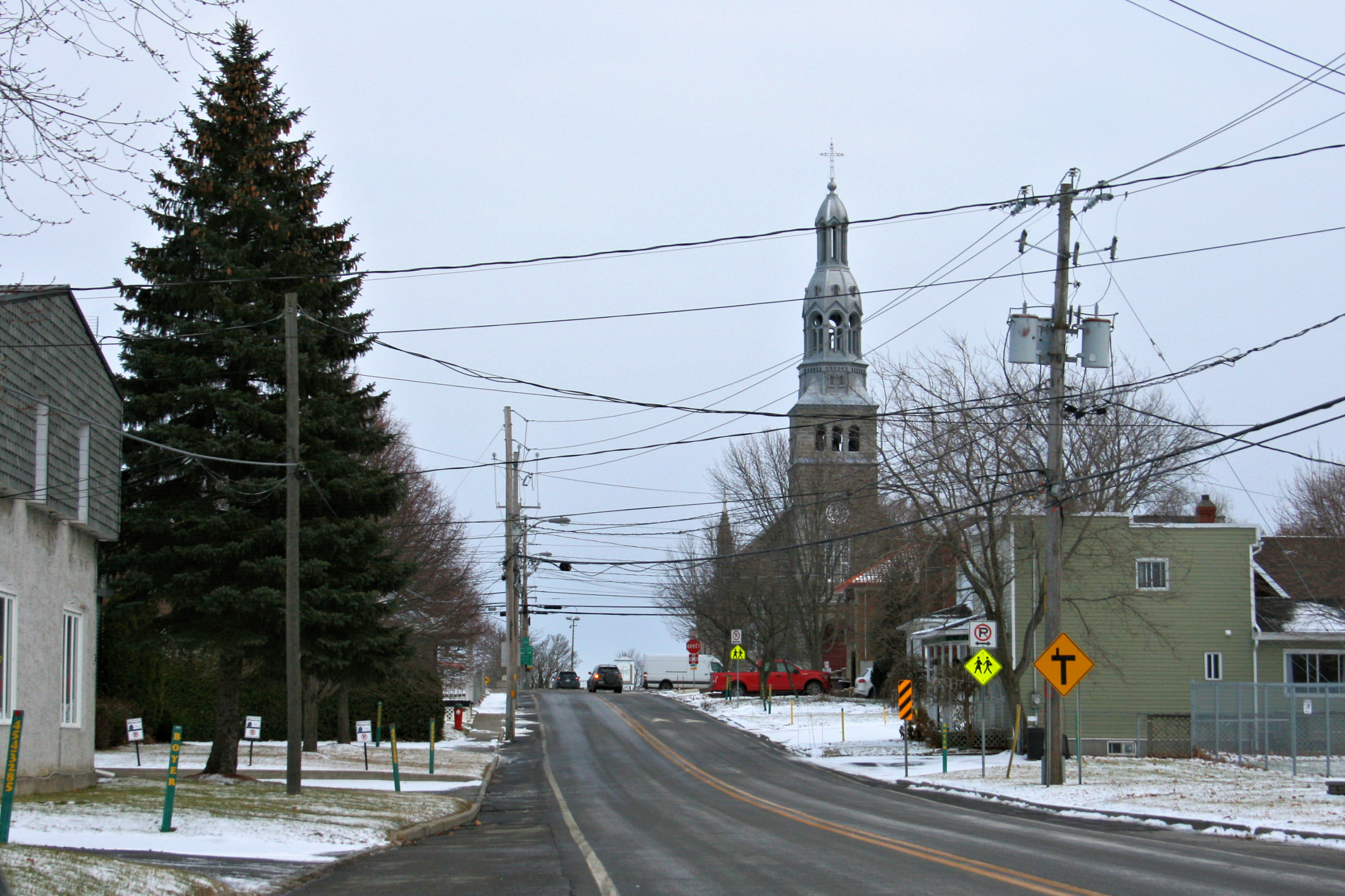
- Downtown Saint-Isidore

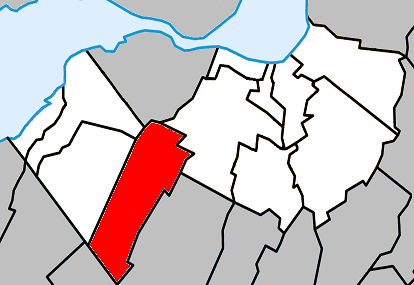
- Location within Roussillon RCM

- Location in southern Quebec
- Coordinates: 45.3°N 73.68°W
- Country: Canada
- Province: Quebec
- Region: Montérégie
- RCM: Roussillon
- Constituted: July 1, 1855

Government
  - Mayor: Sylvain Payant
  - Federal riding: Châteauguay—Les Jardins-de-Napierville
  - Prov. riding: Châteauguay

Area
  - Total: 52.20 km^{2} (20.15 sq mi)
  - Land: 52.29 km^{2} (20.19 sq mi)

Population (2021)
  - Total: 2,769
  - Density: 53/km^{2} (140/sq mi)
  - Pop 2016-2021: ▲6.2%
  - Dwellings: 1,094
- Time zone: UTC−5 (EST)
  - Summer (DST): UTC−4 (EDT)
- Postal code(s): J0L 2A0
- Area codes: 450 and 579
- Highways: R-207; R-221
- Website: www.municipalite.saint-isidore.qc.ca

Saint-Isidore (French pronunciation: [sɛ̃t‿izidɔʁ]) is a parish municipality in Roussillon Regional County Municipality in the Montérégie administrative region of Quebec, Canada. The population as of the Canada 2021 Census was 2,769. It is the hometown of mixed martial arts champion Georges St-Pierre and Kevin Bedard.

== Demographics ==
Historical Census Data - Saint-Isidore, Montérégie, Quebec
Year	Pop.	±%
1861	1,992	—
1871	1,814	−8.9%
1881	1,591	−12.3%
1891	1,463	−8.0%
1901	1,315	−10.1%
1911	1,166	−11.3%
1921	1,129	−3.2%
1931	1,145	+1.4%
1941	1,122	−2.0%
1951	1,239	+10.4%
1956	1,374	+10.9%
1961	1,496	+8.9%
1966	1,638	+9.5%
1971	1,814	+10.7%
1976	1,954	+7.7%
1981	2,234	+14.3%
1986	2,262	+1.3%
1991	2,247	−0.7%
1996	2,401	+6.9%
2001	2,371	−1.2%
2006	2,489	+5.0%
2011	2,581	+3.7%
2016	2,608	+1.0%
2021	2,769	+6.2%

In the 2021 Census of Population conducted by Statistics Canada, Saint-Isidore had a population of 2,769 living in 1,072 of its 1,094 total private dwellings, a change of 6.2% from its 2016 population of 2,608. With a land area of 52.29 km^{2} (20.19 sq mi), it had a population density of 53.0/km^{2} (137.2/sq mi) in 2021.

Canada census – Saint-Isidore community profile

	2021	2016	2011
Population	2,769 (+6.2% from 2016)	2,608 (+1.0% from 2011)	2,581 (+3.7% from 2006)
Land area	52.29 km^{2} (20.19 sq mi)	52.32 km^{2} (20.20 sq mi)	51.94 km^{2} (20.05 sq mi)
Population density	53/km^{2} (140/sq mi)	49.8/km^{2} (129/sq mi)	49.7/km^{2} (129/sq mi)
Median age	40.4 (M: 40.8, F: 40)	42.2 (M: 41.8, F: 42.6)	41.4 (M: 40.8, F: 41.7)
Private dwellings	1,094 (total)	1,047 (total)	1,011 (total)
Median household income	$94,000	$73,216	$67,656

Notes: 2011 income data for this area has been suppressed for data quality or confidentiality reasons.
References: 2021 2016 2011

Canada Census Mother Tongue - Saint-Isidore, Montérégie, Quebec
Census	Total	French			English			French & English			Other		
Year	Responses	Count	Trend	Pop %	Count	Trend	Pop %	Count	Trend	Pop %	Count	Trend	Pop %
2021	2,770	2,570	▲5.3%	92.9%	85	0.0%	3.1%	25	▲25.0%	0.9%	75	▲36.4%	2.7%
2016	2,605	2,440	▲1.2%	93.7%	85	0.0%	3.3%	20	▼20.0%	0.8%	55	▲57.1%	2.1%
2011	2,555	2,410	▲5.7%	94.3%	85	0.0%	3.3%	25	▲ n/a%	1.0%	35	▼53.3%	1.4%
2006	2,440	2,280	▲6.3%	93.4%	85	▼37.0%	3.5%	0	▼100.0%	0.0%	75	▲66.7%	3.1%
2001	2,340	2,145	▼3.6%	91.7%	135	▲237.5%	5.8%	15	▼66.7%	0.6%	45	▼40.0%	1.9%
1996	2,385	2,225	n/a	93.3%	40	n/a	1.7%	45	n/a	1.9%	75	n/a	3.1%

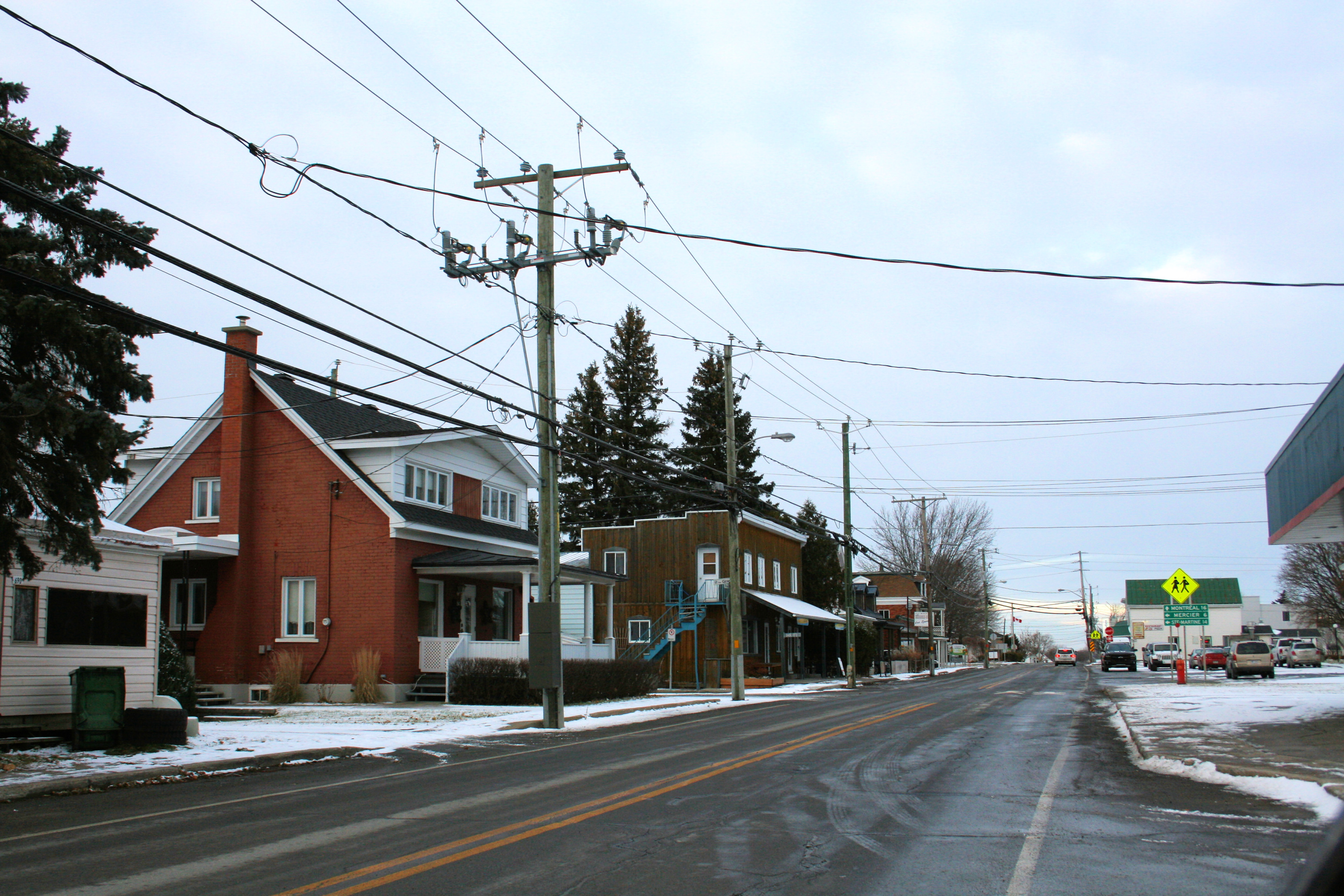
Route 207 at St-Isidore

== Notable people ==
- Georges St-Pierre, mixed martial artist

== See also ==
- Roussillon Regional County Municipality
- Châteauguay River
- Noire River (rivière de l'Esturgeon)
- Saint-Regis River
- List of parish municipalities in Quebec
