= Roussillon Regional County Municipality =

Roussillon
- Regional county municipality
- Location in province of Quebec.
- Coordinates: 45°22′N 73°34′W
- Country: Canada
- Province: Quebec
- Region: Montérégie
- Effective: January 1, 1982
- Named for: Régiment Royal Roussillon
- County seat: Saint-Constant

Government
  - Type: Prefecture
  - Prefect: Nathalie Simon

Area
  - Total: 403.60 km^{2} (155.83 sq mi)
  - Land: 423.82 km^{2} (163.64 sq mi)
- There is an apparent contradiction between two authoritative sources

Population (2016)
  - Total: 171,443
  - Density: 404.5/km^{2} (1,048/sq mi)
  - Change 2011–2016: ▲5.7%
- Population excludes incompletely enumerated First Nations reserves
- Time zone: UTC−5 (EST)
  - Summer (DST): UTC−4 (EDT)
- Area codes: 450 and 579
- Website: www.mrcroussillon.qc.ca

Roussillon (French pronunciation: [ʁusijɔ̃]) is a regional county municipality in the Montérégie region of Quebec, Canada. The seat is in Saint-Constant, Quebec. The region's population was 171,443 as of the 2016 census.

== Subdivisions ==
There are 11 subdivisions and one native reserve within the RCM:

Cities & Towns (9)

- Candiac
- Châteauguay
- Delson
- La Prairie
- Léry
- Mercier
- Saint-Constant
- Sainte-Catherine
- Saint-Philippe

Municipalities (1)

- Saint-Mathieu

Parishes (1)

- Saint-Isidore

Native Reserves (1)
(not associated with RCM)

- Kahnawake

== Demographics ==
=== Population ===
Canada census – Roussillon community profile

	2021	2016	2011
Population	185,568 (+8.2% from 2016)	171,443 (+5.7% from 2011)	162,187 (+8.1% from 2006)
Land area	420.44 km^{2} (162.33 sq mi)	423.82 km^{2} (163.64 sq mi)	423.24 km^{2} (163.41 sq mi)
Population density	441.4/km^{2} (1,143/sq mi)	404.5/km^{2} (1,048/sq mi)	383.2/km^{2} (992/sq mi)
Median age	41.6 (M: 40.8, F: 42.4)	40.6 (M: 39.8, F: 41.4)	39.5 (M: 38.7, F: 40.2)
Private dwellings	72,650 (total)	67,868 (total)	63,441 (total)
Median household income		$78,596	$69,942

References: 2021 2016 2011

Historical Census Data - Roussillon Regional County Municipality, Quebec

Year	Pop.	±%
1991	118,355	—
1996	132,167	+11.7%
2001	138,172	+4.5%

Year	Pop.	±%
2006	149,996	+8.6%
2011	162,187	+8.1%
2016	171,443	+5.7%

=== Language ===
Canada Census Mother Tongue - Roussillon Regional County Municipality
Census	Total	French			English			French & English			Other		
Year	Responses	Count	Trend	Pop %	Count	Trend	Pop %	Count	Trend	Pop %	Count	Trend	Pop %
2021	184,130	131,390	▲0.13%	71.35%	20,740	▲8.5%	11.26%	3,985	▲67.78%	2.16%	24,535	▲50.10%	13.32%
2016	170,835	131,215	▲2.7%	76.8%	19,115	▲2.02%	11.12%	2375	▲16.14%	1.39%	16,345	▲38.28%	9.57%
2011	160,260	127,660	▲4.3%	79.66%	18,735	▲13.2%	11.69%	2,045	▲89.4%	1.28%	11,820	▲37.6%	7.37%
2006	148,560	122,345	▲7.4%	82.35%	16,545	▲1.1%	11.14%	1,080	▼8.5%	0.73%	8,590	▲48.2%	5.78%
2001	137,200	113,865	▲6.3%	82.99%	16,360	▼4.2%	11.93%	1,180	▼11.3%	0.86%	5,795	▲6.1%	4.22%
1996	130,975	107,105	n/a	81.78%	17,080	n/a	13.04%	1,330	n/a	1.01%	5,460	n/a	4.17%

== Transportation ==
=== Access Routes ===
Highways and numbered routes that run through the municipality, including external routes that start or finish at the county border:

- Autoroutes
  - A-15
  - A-30
- Principal Highways
  - R-104
  - R-132
  - R-134
  - R-138
- Secondary Highways
  - R-207
  - R-209
  - R-217
  - R-221
- External Routes
  - None

== See also ==
- List of regional county municipalities and equivalent territories in Quebec
