= Noire River (English River tributary) =

River in Le Haut-Saint-Laurent, Montérégie, Quebec, Canada

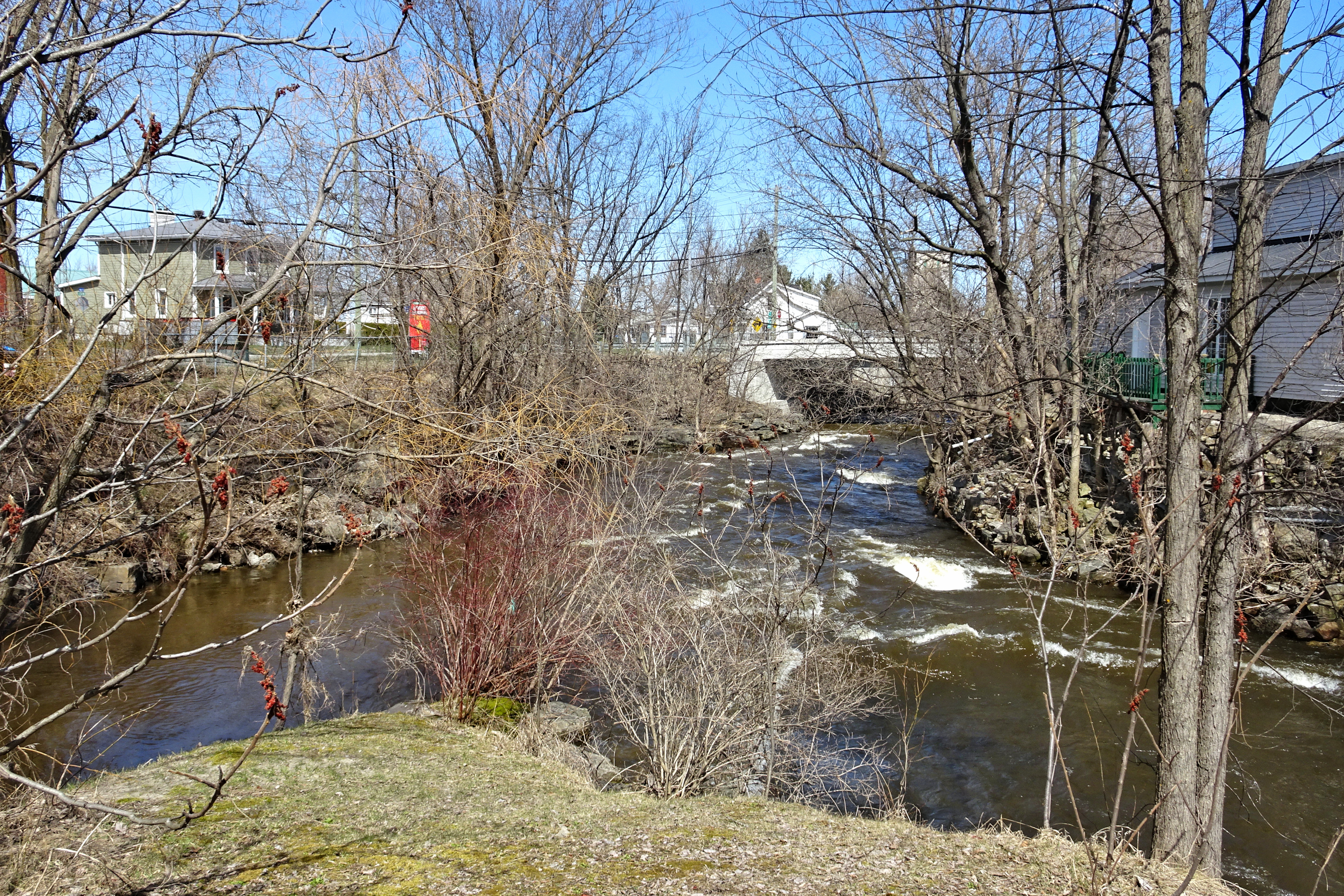
- Mouth of the Noire River at the English River in St-Chrysostome

Location
- Countries: Canada
- Province: Quebec
- Administrative region: Montérégie
- Regional County Municipality: Le Haut-Saint-Laurent

Physical characteristics
- Source
  - elevation: 60 metres (200 ft)
- Mouth: English River
  - location: Saint-Chrysostome
  - elevation: 50 metres (160 ft)
- Length: 8.0 km (5.0 mi)

Basin features
- Progression: English River→ Châteauguay River→ St. Lawrence River
- Tributaries
  - left: Ruisseau Joseph-Primeau

The Noire River (French: Rivière Noire) is a tributary of the English River, flowing in the municipalities of Franklin and Saint-Chrysostome, in the Le Haut-Saint-Laurent Regional County Municipality, in the administrative region of Montérégie, in the province of Quebec, in Canada.

This small agricultural valley is mainly served by the route 209 which passes on the south shore and by the rang-de-la-Rivière-Noire Nord road which passes on a segment of the north shore.

The river surface is generally frozen from mid-December to the end of March. Safe circulation on the ice is generally done from the end of December to the beginning of March. The water level of the river varies with the seasons and the precipitation.

== Geography ==
The Noire River has its source at the confluence of Brandy Creek (coming from the west) and another stream (coming from the South). This source is located between chemin du rang des Savary (located on the south side) and chemin Demers (located on the north side).

This source is located in a forest area 8.2 kilometres (5.1 mi) north of the Canada-United States border and 8.9 kilometres (5.5 mi) southwest of the village center of Saint-Chrysostome.

The course of the Noire River flows over 8.0 kilometres (5.0 mi) with a drop of 10 metres (33 ft) according to the following segments:

- 1.8 kilometres (1.1 mi) north-east in Franklin entering the agricultural area, to a stream (coming from the south), very close to the hamlet L'Artifice and Chemin des Savary;
- 6.2 kilometres (3.9 mi) northeasterly in a straight line in the agricultural zone and crossing route 209 and entering the village of Saint-Chrysostome from the side southwest, to its mouth.

The Noire River generally flows north-east in an agricultural area to drain onto the west bank of the English River. This confluence is located in the heart of the village of Saint-Chrysostome, either:

- 10.9 kilometres (6.8 mi) north of the Canada-United States border;
- 13.6 kilometres (8.5 mi) south-east of the confluence of the English river and the Châteauguay River.

From the mouth of the Noire river, the current follows the course of the English river on 20.2 kilometres (12.6 mi) to the west bank of the Châteauguay river; then follows the course of the latter on 20.2 kilometres (12.6 mi) to the south shore of lake Saint-Louis (Saint-Laurent river).

== Toponymy ==
The toponym "Rivière Noire" was formalized on December 5, 1968, at the Commission de toponymie du Québec.

== See also ==
- List of rivers of Quebec
