= Quebec Route 203 =

Highway in Quebec, Canada

Route 203

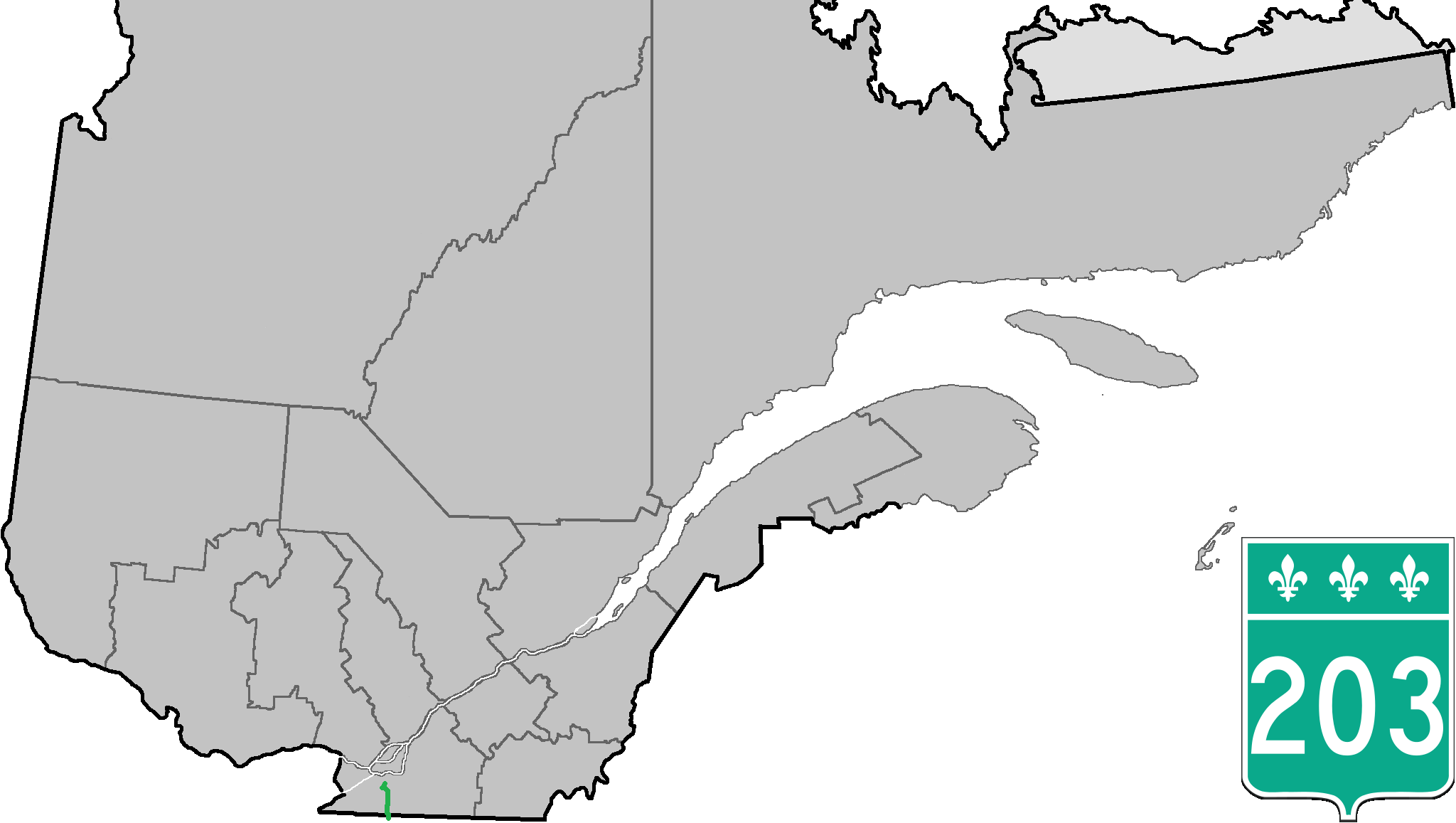

Route information
- Maintained by Transports Québec
- Length: 28.5 km (17.7 mi)

Major junctions
- South end: CR 10 at the U.S. border in Havelock
- R-202 in Havelock; R-209 in Saint-Chrysostome
- North end: R-138 in Sainte-Martine

Location
- Country: Canada
- Province: Quebec
- Major cities: Saint-Chrysostome, Sainte-Martine

Highway system
- Quebec provincial highways; Autoroutes; List; Former
← R-202	→ R-204

Route 203 is a provincial highway located in the Montérégie region of Quebec south of Montreal. The highway starts from the Canada–United States border south of Havelock at the north end of County Road 10 at Cannon Corners at the Cannon Corners-Covey Hill Border Crossing in Mooers, NY. From there, it proceeds north toward Saint-Chrysostome, from there it follows the north shore of English River until it connects with Route 138 in Sainte-Martine just northeast of Très-Saint-Sacrement.

== Municipalities along Route 203 ==
- Havelock
- Saint-Chrysostome
- Howick
- Très-Saint-Sacrement
- Sainte-Martine
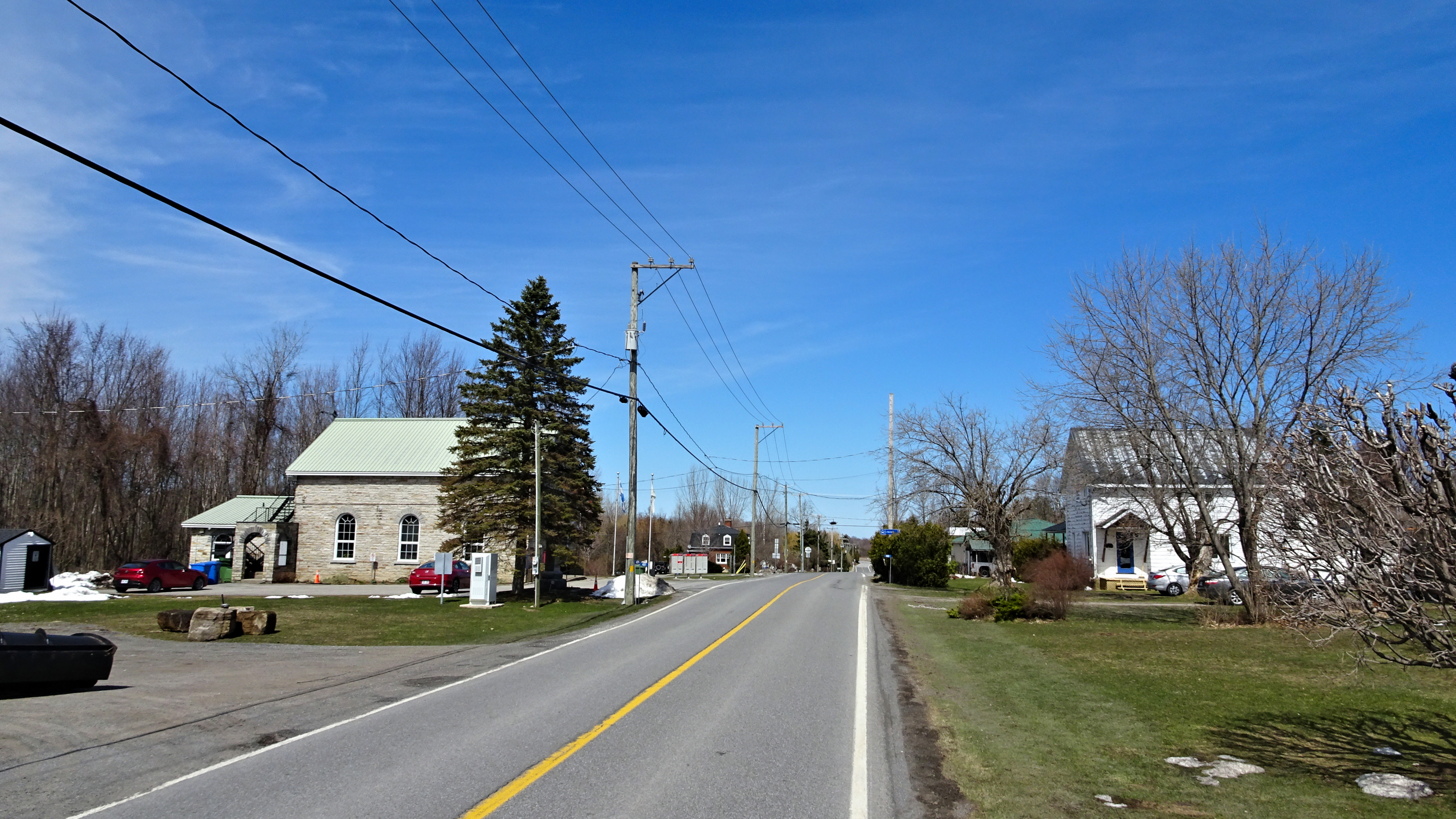
Route 203 through Havelock.

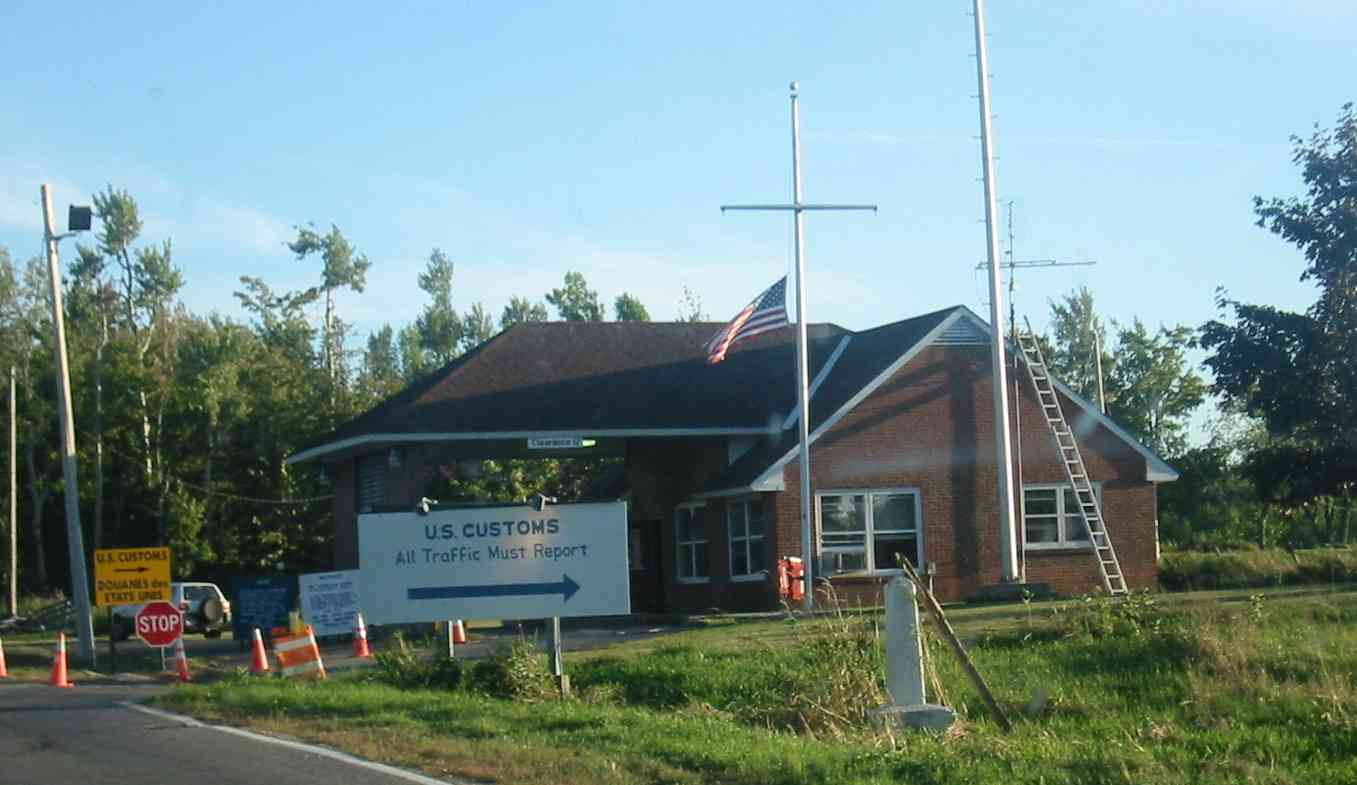
South end of route 203 at Cannon Corners border crossing.

== Major intersections ==
The entire route is in Le Haut-Saint-Laurent RCM.

Location	km	mi	Destinations	Notes
Havelock	0	0.0	CR 10 – Mooers	Cannon Corners–Covey Hill Border Crossing; New York state line
Havelock	4.9	3.0	R-202 – Franklin, Hemmingford	
Saint-Chrysostome	11.4	7.1	R-209 – Franklin, Sainte-Clotilde	
Sainte-Martine	28.5	17.7	R-138 – Ormstown, Sainte-Martine	Northern terminus
1.000 mi = 1.609 km; 1.000 km = 0.621 mi

== See also ==
- List of Quebec provincial highways
