= Saint-Jean-Chrysostome =

Saint-Jean-Chrysostome may refer to:

- John Chrysostom, a Christian saint

Places

- Saint-Jean-Chrysostome, Lévis, Quebec, a former municipality in the Canadian province of Quebec which now forms part of the city of Lévis
  - Saint-Jean-Chrysostome Aerodrome, an airport in the Canadian community of Saint-Jean-Chrysostome (in Lévis, Quebec)
- Saint-Jean-Chrysostome, Montérégie, Quebec a former parish municipality in south-west Quebec which now forms part of the municipality of Saint-Chrysostome, Quebec
