= Saint-Jean-Chrysostome, Quebec =

Saint-Jean-Chrysostome may refer to two former municipalities in Quebec:

- Saint-Jean-Chrysostome, Lévis, Quebec, a former city in the Chaudière-Appalaches region of Quebec, since 2002 a district within Les-Chutes-de-la-Chaudière-Est borough of Lévis, Quebec
- Saint-Jean-Chrysostome, Montérégie, Quebec, a former parish municipality in the Montérégie region of Quebec, since 1999 part of Saint-Chrysostome, Quebec
