= Cannon Corners–Covey Hill Border Crossing =

Canada–United States border crossing

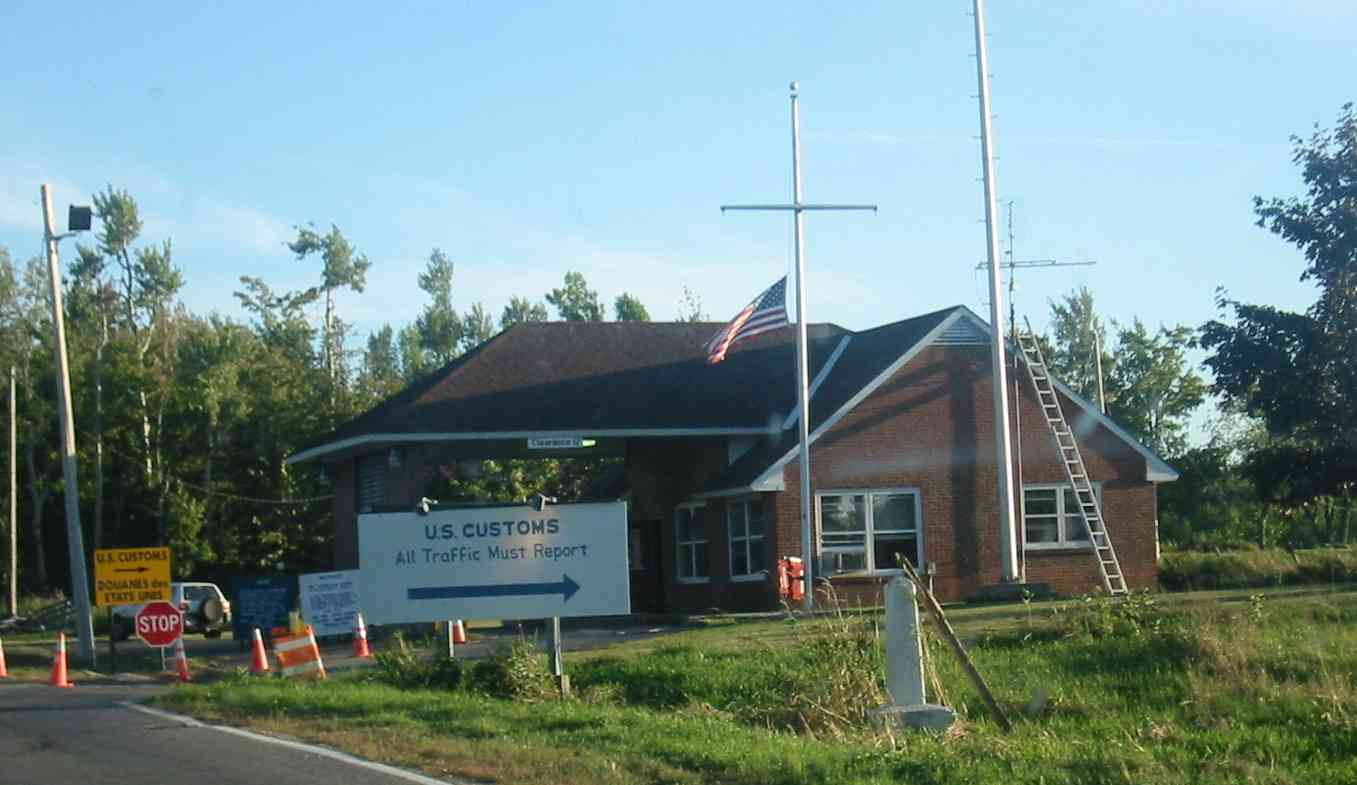
- Cannon Corners, New York, Border Inspection Station as seen in 2001

Location
- Country: United States; Canada
- Location: R-203 / Cannon Corners Road; US Port: 1295 Cannon Corners Road, Mooers Forks, New York 12959; Canadian Port: 2 Route 203, Havelock, Quebec J0S 2C0
- Coordinates: 45.003116°N 73.756331°W

Details
- Opened: 1925

Website
- http://www.cbp.gov/xp/cgov/toolbox/contacts/ports/ny/0712.xml

The Cannon Corners–Covey Hill Border Crossing connects the towns of Havelock, Quebec, to Mooers Forks, New York, on the Canada–US border. It can be reached by Quebec Route 203 on the Canadian side and by Cannon Corners Road on the American side. The United States completed work on a new border station in 2012.

== History ==
Until 1974, the US had no border inspection station at this crossing. The US Customs Service operated an office in rented space inside a small duplex storefront near Ellenburg, New York, and people entering the US were expected to travel there to report for inspection. Canada built a two-story Cape Cod-style border station around 1950. This border station was replaced by a single-story structure in 2011. The previous border station was subsequently demolished.

== Canada–United States preclearance ==
On January 2, 2025, the Canada Border Services Agency (CBSA) announced the future plan to launch its first land preclearance operation in the United States. Under the plan, the Covey Hill port of entry will be closed for two years, and CBSA will operate from the Cannon Corners port of entry in New York, conduct security checks and immigration processing for travellers and goods at the Cannon Corners site. Claims for refugee protection will not be processed at this location; refugee claimants will still need to use a Canadian port of entry to make claims. This initiative is designed to enhance border security and facilitate the efficient movement of people and goods between Canada and the U.S.

Note, that currently the preclearance operation has not yet launched and the Covey Hill port of entry remains open.

== See also ==
- List of Canada–United States border crossings
