= Quebec Route 209 =

Highway in Quebec, Canada

Route 209

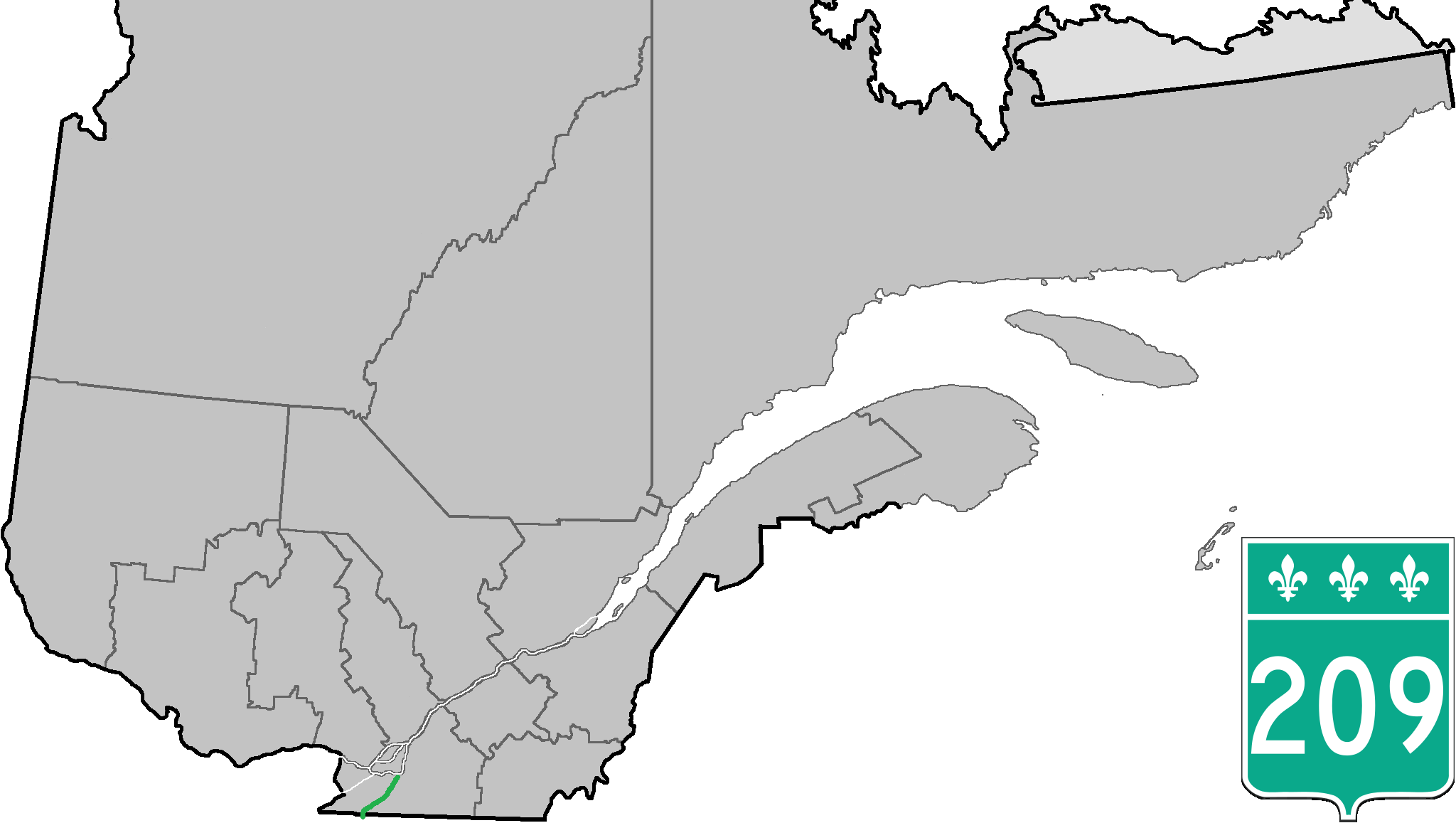

Route information
- Maintained by Transports Québec
- Length: 58.9 km (36.6 mi)

Major junctions
- South end: NY 189 at the U.S. border in Franklin
- R-201 / R-202 in Franklin; R-203 in Saint-Chrysostome; R-205 in Sainte-Clotilde; R-221 in St-Rémi; A-30 in Saint-Constant (future)
- North end: R-132 in Sainte-Catherine

Location
- Country: Canada
- Province: Quebec

Highway system
- Quebec provincial highways; Autoroutes; List; Former
← R-208	→ R-210

Route 209 is a provincial highway located in the Montérégie region of Quebec south of Montreal. The route runs from the Canada-United States border in Franklin and ends at the Saint-Constant/Sainte-Catherine limit, south of Montreal at the junction of Route 132. South of the US border it continues as New York State Route 189 in Clinton, New York. This road serves as an alternative route to Route 138 (towards Montreal) and the southwestern suburbs) which is a parallel route to Route 209 located roughly 10 kilometres west of it. It also provides the main link to Saint-Rémi, the largest city in the Jardins-de-Napierville MRC.

== Municipalities along Route 209 ==
- Franklin
- Saint-Chrysostome
- Sainte-Clotilde
- Saint-Rémi
- Saint-Constant
- Saint-Catherine
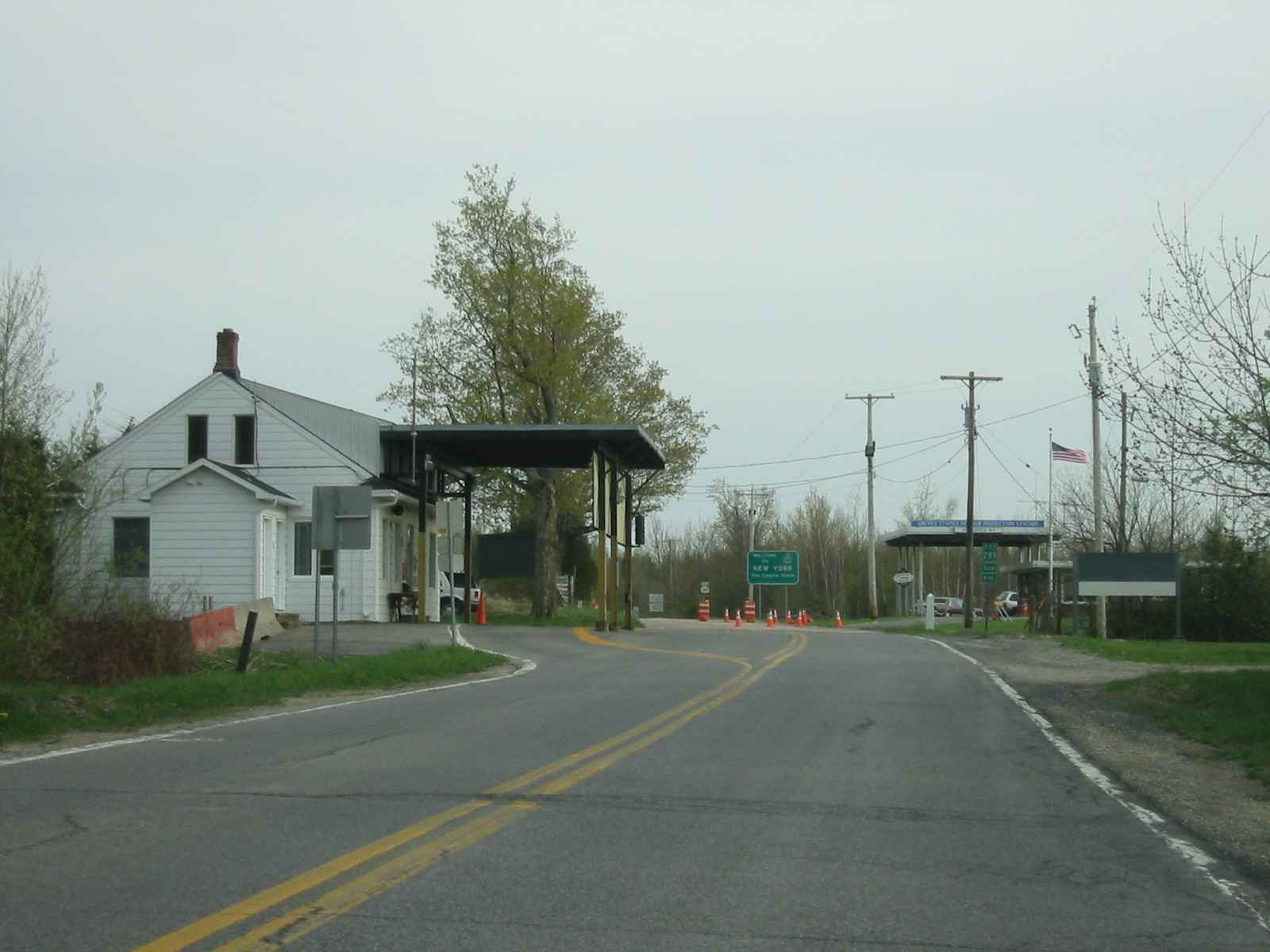
Route 209 south end at the Canada-US Border.

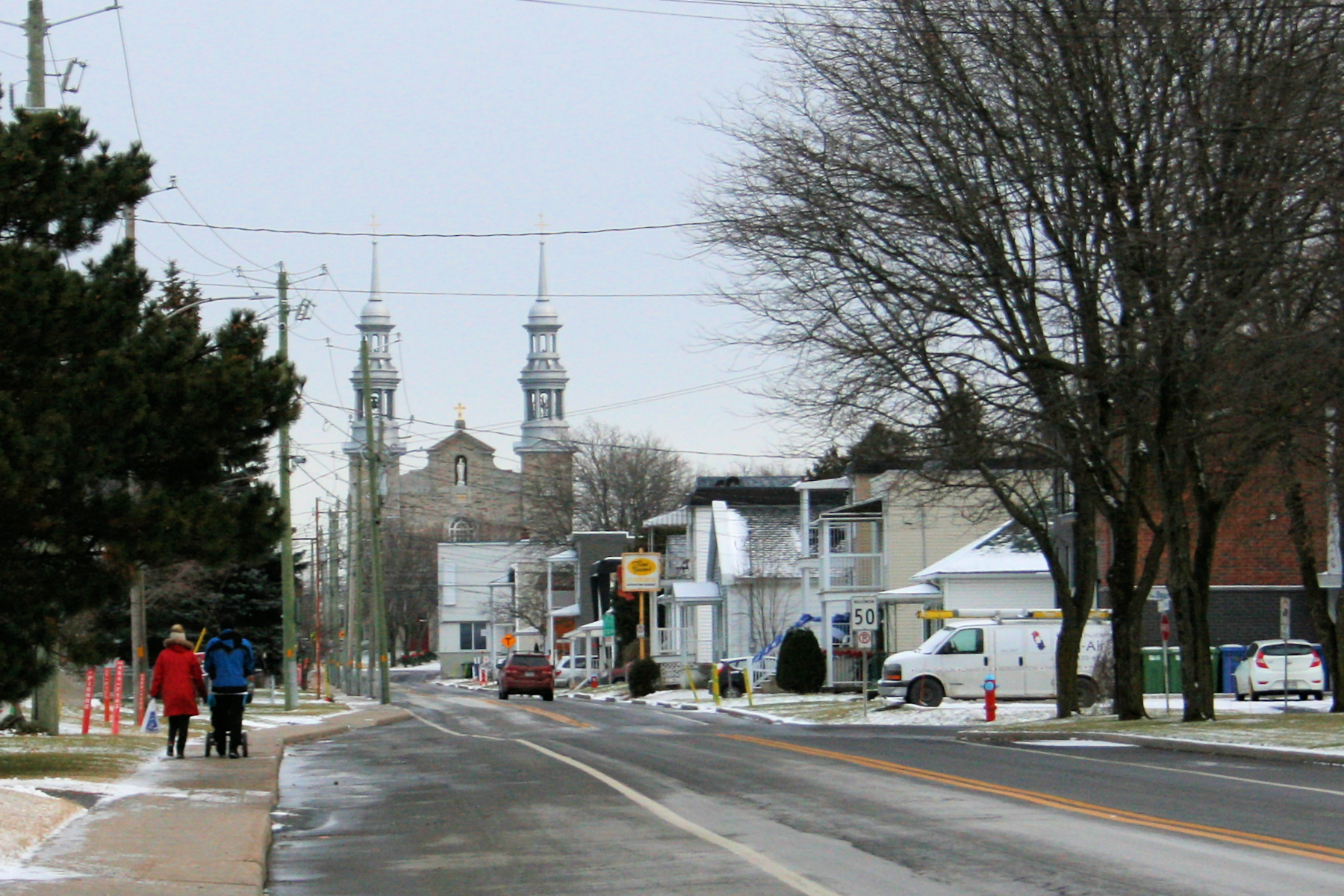
Église street near junction with route 209 in Saint-Rémi.

== Major intersections ==
RCM	Location	km	mi	Destinations	Notes
Le Haut-Saint-Laurent	Franklin	0.0	0.0	NY 189 south – Churubusco	Continuation into New York
Le Haut-Saint-Laurent	Franklin	0.0	0.0	Churubusco–Franklin Centre Border Crossing	No northbound access from the U.S. to Canada
Le Haut-Saint-Laurent	Franklin	4.5	2.8	R-202 – Hinchinbrooke, Havelock	
Le Haut-Saint-Laurent	Franklin	8.5	5.3	R-201 – Franklin, Ormstown	
Le Haut-Saint-Laurent	Saint-Chrysostome	20.3	12.6	R-203 – Havelock, Très-Saint-Sacrement	
Les Jardins-de-Napierville	Sainte-Clotilde	32.2	20.0	R-205 – Hemmingford Township, Saint-Urbain-Premier	
Les Jardins-de-Napierville	Saint-Rémi	43.8	27.2	R-221 – Saint-Michel, Saint-Isidore	
Roussillon	Sainte-Catherine	58.9	36.6	R-132 – Kahnawake, Delson	
1.000 mi = 1.609 km; 1.000 km = 0.621 mi: Incomplete access

== See also ==
- List of Quebec provincial highways
