= Hinchinbrook Brook =

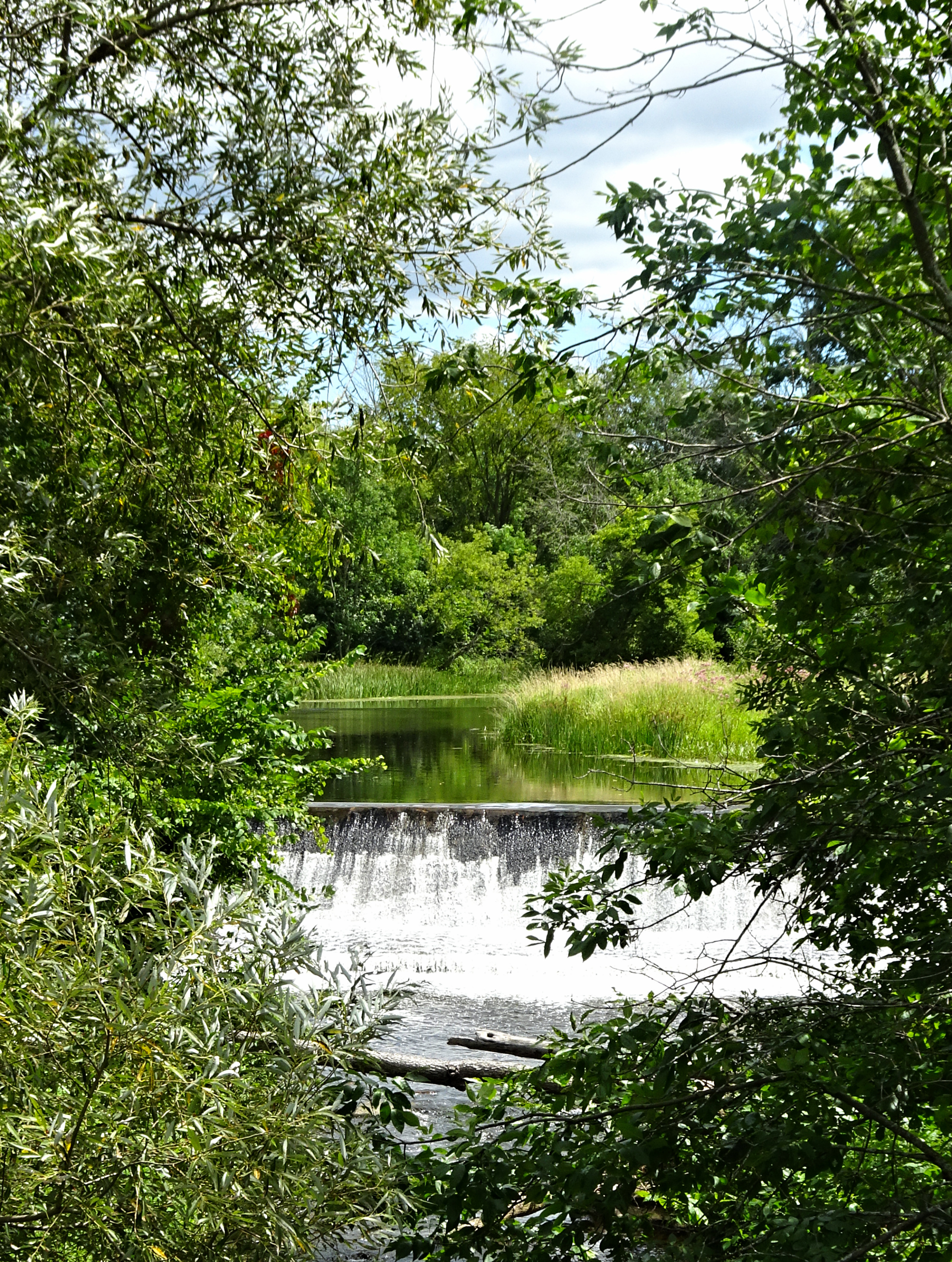
- Hinchinbrooke Brook at Athelstan, Quebec
- Native name: Rivière Hinchinbrooke (French)

Location
- Countries: Canada
- Provinces and territories of Canada: Quebec
- Administrative region: Montérégie
- Regional County Municipality: Le Haut-Saint-Laurent Regional County Municipality

Physical characteristics
- Source
  - location: New York State
- Mouth: Châteauguay River
  - location: Hinchinbrooke, Quebec
  - elevation: 45 m (148 ft)
- Length: 31.3 km (19.4 mi)

Basin features
- Tributaries
  - left: (upstream) Collins Creek.
  - right: (upstream) Two unidentified streams, Brinkworth Creek.

The Hinchinbrook Brook (French: Rivière Hinchinbrooke) is a tributary of the Châteauguay River, flowing on the south bank of the Saint Lawrence River, in:

- the municipality of Hinchinbrooke, in the administrative region of Montérégie, in the province of Quebec, in Canada;
- Franklin County, in New York State, in United States.

The lower part of the course of this river is accessible by Brook Road (east-west) and the Herdman Customs climb (north-south). The American part of the course of the river is mainly accessible by the River Street which leads south to the town of Chateaugay.

The surface of the Hinchinbrook Brook (except the rapids areas) is generally frozen from mid-December to the end of March; however, safe circulation on the ice is generally done from the end of December to the beginning of March. The water level of the river varies with the seasons and the precipitation; the spring flood occurs in March or April.

== Geography ==
The Hinchinbrook Brook originates in mountain and forest areas in New York State.

From its source, the current of the Hinchinbrooke River descends on 31.3 kilometres (19.4 mi), with a drop of , according to the following segments:

Upper part, in American territory (segment of 15.2 kilometres (9.4 mi)) Note: This river is designated Hinchinbrook Brook in the States of New York.

- 9.8 kilometres (6.1 mi) westwards, branching north-west, to a stream (coming from south-east);
- 4.4 kilometres (2.7 mi) first towards the north, then by bifurcating towards the west approaching the border, up to the Canada-US border. Note: At the border, the elevation is 140 metres (460 ft).

Lower part, in Canadian territory (segment of 16.1 kilometres (10.0 mi))

- 4.2 kilometres (2.6 mi) to the north in the forest zone, passing on the west side of Parc-Davignon, collecting the Brinkworth stream (coming from the east), along the Montée Herdman road (on the east side ) route 202, until cutting this last road on the south side of the hamlet Herdman;
- 6.0 kilometres (3.7 mi) north-west then west in forest areas, sometimes agricultural, forming some streamers, up to Collins stream (coming from the south-east);
- 1.2 kilometres (0.75 mi) to the west branching to the northwest, and crossing Moonlight Lake (length: 0.7 kilometres (0.43 mi); altitude: 60 metres (200 ft) , to its mouth;
- 4.7 kilometres (2.9 mi) towards the north-west in the agricultural zone by forming some serpentines, by cutting the rise of Powerscourt, until its mouth.

The confluence of the Hinchinbrook Brook is located 5.3 kilometres (3.3 mi) northwest of the Canada-United States border, 5.2 kilometres (3.2 mi) south of the village center of Huntingdon, 52.4 kilometres (32.6 mi) south of the mouth of the Châteauguay River.

From its mouth, the current follows on 43.8 kilometres (27.2 mi) generally northwards the course of the Châteauguay river, which flows on the south bank of the St. Lawrence River.

== Toponymy ==
The toponym "Rivière Hinchinbrooke" was formalized on November 29, 1991 at the Commission de toponymie du Québec.

== See also ==
- U.S. Geological Survey Geographic Names Information System: Hinchinbrook Brook
- List of rivers of Quebec
