= Saint-Jean-Chrysostome, Montérégie, Quebec =

Former parish municipality that is now part of Saint-Chrysostome, Quebec

Saint-Jean-Chrysostome was a former parish municipality in Le Haut-Saint-Laurent Regional County Municipality in the Montérégie region of Quebec.

On September 29, 1999, it amalgamated into the municipality of Saint-Chrysostome.
