= Brenda Shanahan =

Canadian politician (born 1958)

Member of Parliament for Châteauguay—Lacolle
- In office October 19, 2015 – March 23, 2025
- Preceded by: Sylvain Chicoine
- Succeeded by: Nathalie Provost

Personal details
- Born: 1958 (age 67–68)
- Party: Liberal
- Profession: Banker, financial advisor, columnist

Brenda Shanahan (born 1958) is a Canadian politician who was elected to represent the riding of Châteauguay—Lacolle in the House of Commons of Canada in the 2015 Canadian federal election, and was re-elected in 2019 and 2021. She did not seek re-election in 2025.

== Electoral record ==
2021 Canadian federal election: Châteauguay—Lacolle
Party	Candidate	Votes	%	±%	Expenditures
Liberal	Brenda Shanahan	18,029	37.03	-1.36	$52,662.66
Bloc Québécois	Patrick O'Hara	18,017	37.01	-0.16	$32,231.91
Conservative	Pierre Bournaki	5,538	11.01	-0.16	$11,071.20
New Democratic	Hannah Wolker	3,752	7.71	+0.07	$369.79
People's	Jeff Benoit	1,821	3.74	+2.67	$2,883.60
Green	Frédéric Olivier	801	1.65	-2.03	$0.00
Free	André Lafrance	448	0.92	–	$0.00
Indépendance du Québec	Marc Gagnon	277	0.57	-0.18	$0.00
Total valid votes/expense limit		48,683	97.87	–	$110,696.46
Total rejected ballots		1,061	2.13	+0.13	
Turnout		49,744	61.58	-6.64	
Registered voters		79,853			
Liberal hold		Swing		-0.60	
Source: Elections Canada

2019 Canadian federal election: Châteauguay—Lacolle
Party	Candidate	Votes	%	±%	Expenditures
Liberal	Brenda Shanahan	20,118	38.39	-0.70	$40,263.40
Bloc Québécois	Claudia Valdivia	19,479	37.17	+12.81	$3,185.41
Conservative	Hugues Laplante	5,851	11.17	-0.04	none listed
New Democratic	Marika Lalime	4,005	7.64	-15.50	$0.00
Green	Meryam Haddad	1,929	3.68	+1.78	$3,739.15
People's	Jeff Benoit	563	1.07	–	$3,708.72
Indépendance du Québec	Marc Gagnon	393	0.75	–	$0.00
Marxist–Leninist	Pierre Chénier	64	0.12	-0.17	$0.00
Total valid votes/expense limit		52,402	98.00		
Total rejected ballots		1,071	2.00	+0.28	
Turnout		53,473	68.22	-0.99	
Eligible voters		78,384			
Liberal hold		Swing		-6.76	
Source: Elections Canada

2015 Canadian federal election: Châteauguay—Lacolle
Party	Candidate	Votes	%	±%	Expenditures
Liberal	Brenda Shanahan	20,245	39.10	+28.90	$26,214
Bloc Québécois	Sophie Stanké	12,615	24.36	−2.55	$27,153
New Democratic	Sylvain Chicoine (incumbent)	11,986	23.15	-25.57	$27,865
Conservative	Philippe St-Pierre	5,805	11.21	−0.82	$3,357
Green	Jency Mercier	982	1.90	-0.01	$2,348
Marxist–Leninist	Linda Sullivan	149	0.29	+0.06	none listed
Total valid votes/expense limit		51,782	98.27		$208,824
Total rejected, unmarked and declined ballots		909	1.73	–	–
Turnout		52,691	69.21	–	–
Eligible voters		76,129	–	–	–
Liberal gain from New Democratic		Swing		+27.24	
