= English River (Chateauguay River tributary) =

English River Rivière des Anglais
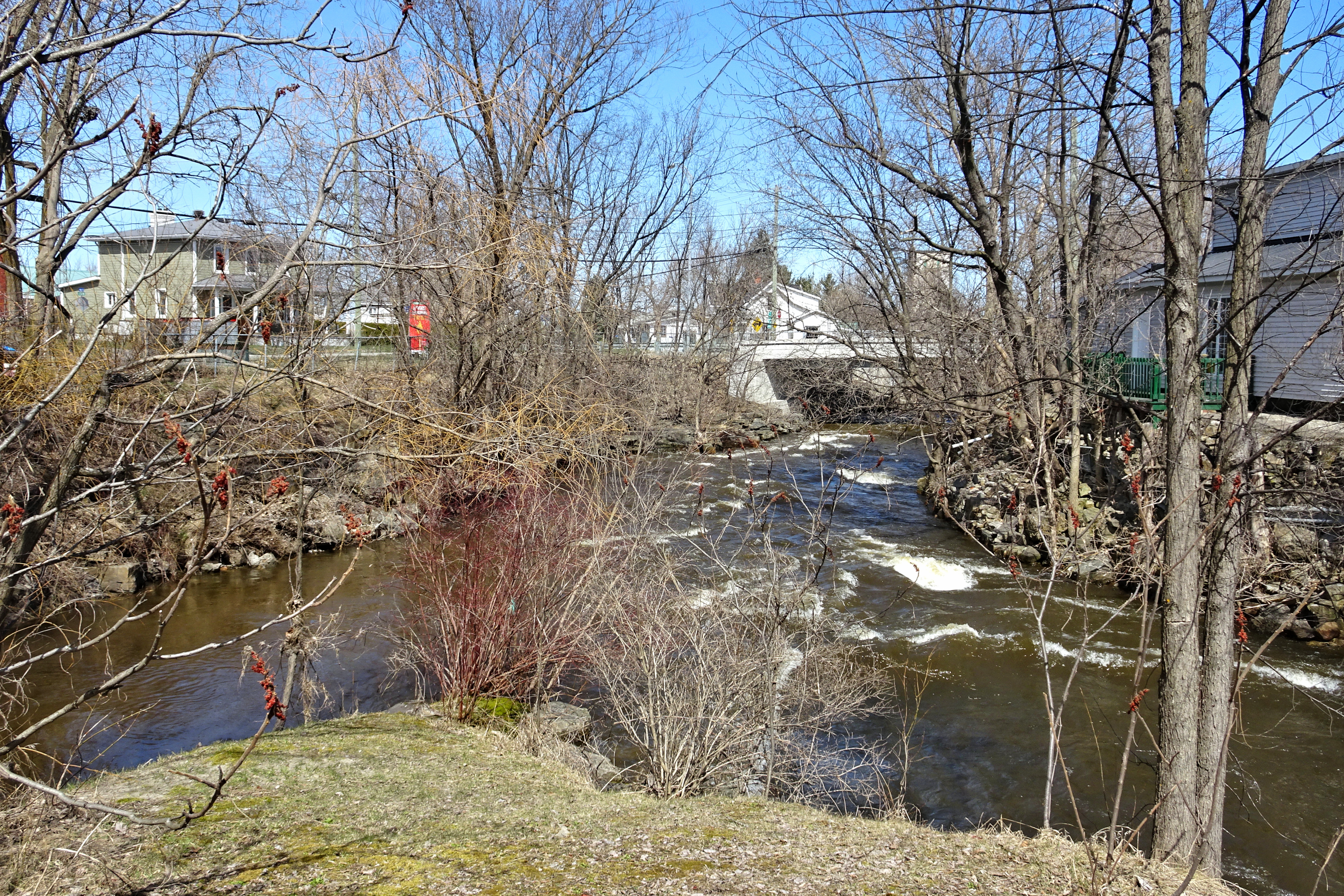

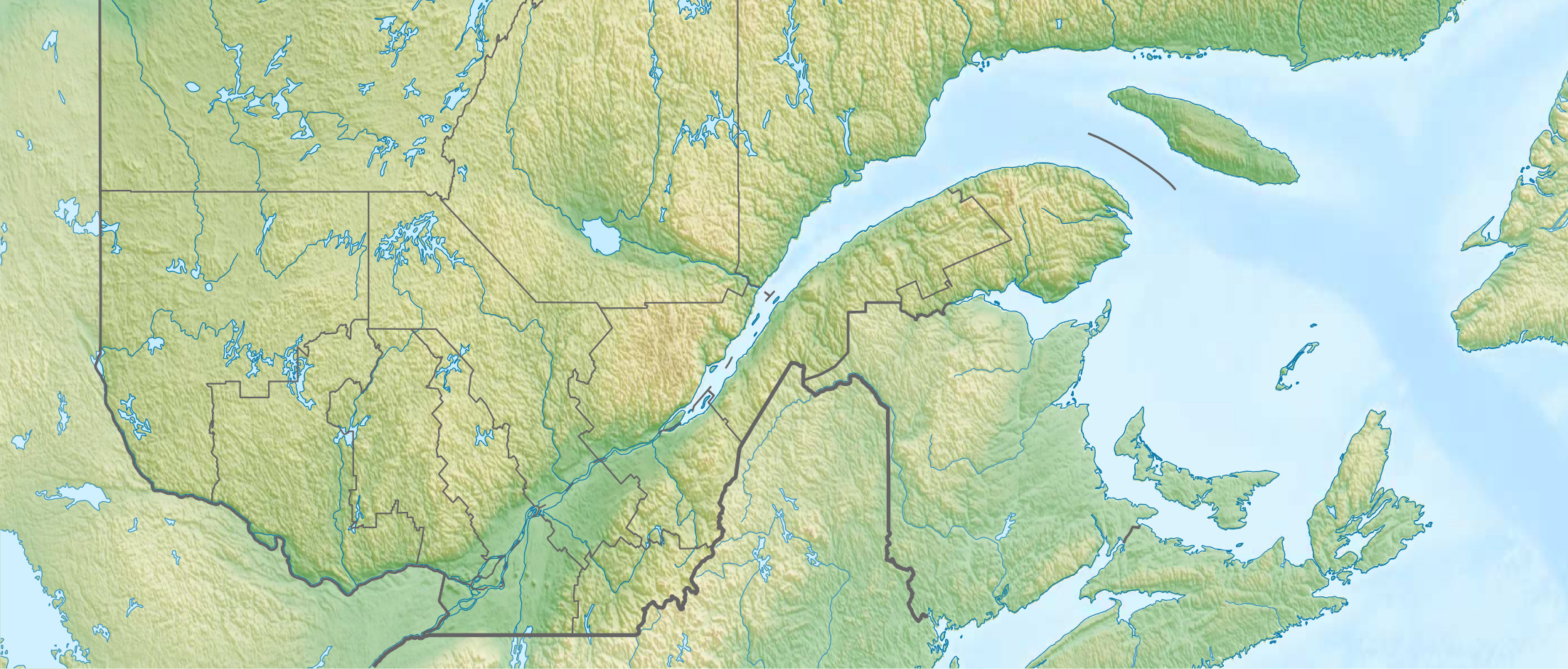
- Location within Quebec South

Location
- Country: United States, Canada
- State/Province: New York State, Quebec

Physical characteristics
- Source
  - location: Clinton County, New York, United States
- Mouth: Chateauguay River
  - location: Très-Saint-Sacrement, Le Haut-Saint-Laurent RCM, Montérégie, Quebec, Canada
  - coordinates: 45°12′48″N 73°49′50″W
  - elevation: 40 m (130 ft)
- Length: 67.1 km (41.7 mi)

Basin features
- Progression: Chateauguay River→ St. Lawrence River
- River system: St. Lawrence River
- Tributaries
  - left: (upstream) Howe-Holmes brook, Robertson brook, Anderson brook, Zenophilia-Primeau brook, Atkinson brook, McKenzie-Chaloux stream, Noire River, Boileau brook, Levi brook, non brook identified, Mooer Creek, Deneault Creek, two unidentified streams, Robson Creek.
  - right: (upstream) Bouchard brook, Lemieux-Muir brook, McGregor brook, Reddick brook, Templeton brook, Norton brook, Cloutier brook, Toynton brook, Demers-Vincent brook, Vincent watercourse, Giroux brook, Viau brook, Prévost

The English River (French: rivière des Anglais in Canada) is a tributary of the Chateauguay River. This cross-border river between Canada and the United States crosses:

- Clinton County, in New York State, United States;
- Les Jardins-de-Napierville Regional County Municipality, including Hemmingford in Montérégie, in Quebec, Canada;
- Le Haut-Saint-Laurent Regional County Municipality, including the municipalities of Havelock, Saint-Chrysostome and Très-Saint-Sacrement, in Montérégie, in Quebec, Canada.

In the state of New York, the English River course is mainly served by Drown Road, White Road (east-west direction), Davison Road (east-west direction) and Blackman Corners Road (CR 16) (north direction -South). In Canada, the course of the English River is mainly served mainly by the route 203 (chemin du rang du Moulin, chemin du rang Sainte-Anne).

The river surface is generally frozen from mid-December to the end of March. Safe circulation on the ice is generally done from the end of December to the beginning of March. The water level of the river varies with the seasons and the precipitation.

== Geography ==
Forest and agricultural streams feed the head of the English river. Its course begins in Clinton County, New York state, near the intersection of Stone Road and Canaan Road. This source is located 5.1 kilometres (3.2 mi) south of the Canada-United States border and 11.3 kilometres (7.0 mi) west of Champlain Lake.

The course of the English river flows over 67.1 kilometres (41.7 mi) with a drop of according to the following segments:

Course of the English River in New York State: the river is 23.4 kilometres (14.5 mi) long, with a drop of :

- 8.8 kilometres (5.5 mi) to the east, forming a curve to the south, and passing a short distance at the end of the segment in the Clinton Mooers Forest Preserve Detached Parcel, to Cannon Corners Road
- 14.6 kilometres (9.1 mi) to the east along the Davison Road (passing on the north side), crossing the Lamberton Road (north-south direction), branching north-east along the Blackman Corners Road (CR16) (passing on the east side) and crossing the Scriver Road (east-west direction, up to the Canada-US border.

Course of the Rivière des Anglais in Quebec: the river is 43.7 kilometres (27.2 mi) long, with a drop of 50 metres (160 ft)), crossing over agricultural areas and sometimes forest islets:

- 2.9 kilometres (1.8 mi) north-west in Havelock, meandering through agricultural and forestry areas, up to Covey Hill road;
- 6.9 kilometres (4.3 mi) first towards the northwest by forming a hook towards the west to collect the Robson stream (coming from the southeast and named West Branch English River in the county of Clinton, NY, to then go up north along the Montrée Jackson, to the route 202 West, which it intersects at 0.2 kilometres (0.12 mi) east of hamlet The Fort (road crossing);
- 4.7 kilometres (2.9 mi) by forming a few eighths, towards the northwest by collecting the Prévost stream (coming from the east), by cutting the Montée Giroux (north-south direction) and by collecting the Vaillancourt stream (coming from the southwest) and Mooer stream (coming from the southwest) at the end of the segment, up to Cowan road which it intersects at 0.7 kilometres (0.43 mi) west of the hamlet Cowan;
- 8.8 kilometres (5.5 mi) in agricultural area first towards the north, the southwest by collecting the Giroux stream (coming from the northeast) by forming a big curve towards the south by collecting the Levi stream (coming from the south), then towards the northwest by collecting the Boilleau stream (coming from the southwest) and the Vincent river (coming from the east), up to the confluence of the Noire River (coming from the south), in the heart of the village of Saint-Chrystostome;
- 7.5 kilometres (4.7 mi) in the agricultural zone to the north by collecting the Toynton stream (coming from the east), then the northwest by collecting the McKenzie-Chaloux stream (coming from the southwest), by collecting the Cloutier stream (coming from the northeast) and passing on the east side of the Aubrey hamlet, to the confluence of the Norton stream (coming from the East);
- 12.7 kilometres (7.9 mi) first on 5.3 kilometres (3.3 mi) towards the west by forming some curves by collecting the stream Athinson (coming from the south) and Zénophile-Primeau (coming from the south), to the outlet of Anderson stream (coming from the south), then on 7.4 kilometres (4.6 mi) to the north through the village of Howick, not collecting the Lemieux-Muir stream (coming from east) and Robertson Creek (coming from the south) to its mouth.

The English River generally flows north-west in an agricultural zone to go to flow on the south bank in a bend in the Châteauguay River, near the route 138. This confluence is located at:

- 3.4 kilometres (2.1 mi) north of the village center of Howick;
- 10.6 kilometres (6.6 mi) south-west of the Beauharnois Canal;
- 13.6 kilometres (8.5 mi) north-west of the village center of Saint-Chrystome;
- 21.6 kilometres (13.4 mi) south of the confluence of the Châteauguay River and Lake Saint-Louis.

From the mouth of the English river the current follows the course of the Châteauguay River on 20.2 kilometres (12.6 mi) to the south shore of lake Saint-Louis (Saint Lawrence river).

== Toponymy ==
In Clinton County (NY, USA), this river is designated "English River".

The toponym "Rivière des Anglais" was formalized on December 5, 1968 at the Commission de toponymie du Québec.

== See also ==
- List of rivers of New York State
- List of rivers of Quebec
- Battle of the Chateauguay, a War of 1812 battle fought at the junction of the English River and the River Chateauguay
