= Châteauguay—Les Jardins-de-Napierville =

Federal electoral district in Quebec, Canada

Quebec electoral district
- Interactive map of riding boundaries from the 2025 federal election

Federal electoral district
- Legislature: House of Commons
MP
Nathalie Provost
Liberal
- District created: 2013
- First contested: 2015
- Last contested: 2025
- District webpage: profile, map

Demographics
- Population (2016): 97,887
- Electors (2019): 78,194
- Area (km²): 940
- Pop. density (per km²): 104.1
- Census division(s): Beauharnois-Salaberry, Les Jardins-de-Napierville, Roussillon
- Census subdivision(s): Châteauguay, Franklin, Hemmingford (township), Hemmingford (village), Havelock, Howick, Mercier, Saint-Rémi, Sainte-Martine, Napierville, Saint-Michel, Saint-Isidore, Sainte-Clotilde, Saint-Chrysostome, Très-Saint-Sacrement, Léry

Châteauguay—Les Jardins-de-Napierville (formerly Châteauguay—Lacolle) (French pronunciation: [ʃatoɡɛ lakɔl]) is a federal electoral district in Quebec. It encompasses a portion of Quebec formerly included in the electoral districts of Beauharnois—Salaberry and Châteauguay—Saint-Constant.

Châteauguay—Lacolle was created by the 2012 federal electoral boundaries redistribution and was legally defined in the 2013 representation order. It came into effect upon the call of the 2015 Canadian federal election.

Following the 2022 federal electoral redistribution the riding was renamed Châteauguay—Les Jardins-de-Napierville. It gained both the Village and Township of Hemmingford, and the municipalities of Très-Saint-Sacrement, Howick, Saint-Chrysostome, Havelock, and Franklin from Salaberry—Suroît and lost a small piece of territory north of Autoroute 30 in Saint-Isidore and a small piece of territory near Ch. St-Bernard in Châteauguay to La Prairie—Atateken.

== Demographics ==
According to the 2021 Canadian census, 2023 representation order

Racial groups: 84.3% White, 6.6% Black, 2.5% Indigenous, 2.0% Latin American, 1.7% Arab
Languages: 75.0% French, 18.4% English, 2.0% Spanish, 1.1% Russian
Religions: 68.7% Christian (54.2% Catholic, 1.8% Christian Orthodox, 1.2% Anglican, 11.7% Other), 3.5% Muslim, 26.8% None
Median income: $41,600 (2020)
Average income: $48,400 (2020)

== Profile ==
The Liberals are strongest in the more Anglophone city of Châteauguay, while the Bloc garners more support in cities like Mercier, Saint-Rémi, Sainte-Martine and Napierville, as well as the rural portions of the riding.

== Members of Parliament ==
This riding has elected the following members of Parliament:

Parliament	Years	Member	Party
Châteauguay—Lacolle; Riding created from Beauharnois—Salaberry and Châteauguay—Saint-Constant
42nd	2015–2019	Brenda Shanahan	Liberal
43rd	2019–2021	Brenda Shanahan	Liberal
44th	2021–2025	Brenda Shanahan	Liberal
Châteauguay—Les Jardins-de-Napierville
45th	2025–present	Nathalie Provost	Liberal

== Election results ==
View source data.
Graph of election results in Châteauguay—Lacolle (minor parties that never got 2% of the vote or didn't run consistently are omitted)

=== Châteauguay—Les Jardins-de-Napierville ===
2025 Canadian federal election
Party	Candidate	Votes	%	±%	Expenditures
Liberal	Nathalie Provost	28,224	45.16	+8.65	$63,004.97
Bloc Québécois	Patrick O'Hara	18,160	29.06	–7.54	$49,915.05
Conservative	David De Repentigny	13,538	21.66	+9.50	none listed
New Democratic	Hannah Wolker	1,377	2.20	–5.61	$0.00
Green	Martine Desrochers	773	1.24	–0.25	$0.00
People's	Nicolas Guérin	429	0.69	–3.09	$1,604.27
Total valid votes		62,501	98.46	+0.59	$137,365.48
Total rejected ballots		975	1.54	–0.59	
Turnout		63,476	69.36	+6.77	
Eligible voters		91,519			
Liberal notional gain from Bloc Québécois		Swing		+8.09	
Source: Elections Canada
Note: number of eligible voters does not include voting day registrations.

2021 federal election redistributed results
Party	Vote	%
Bloc Québécois	19,730	36.59
Liberal	19,685	36.51
Conservative	6,559	12.16
New Democratic	4,215	7.82
People's	2,034	3.77
Green	801	1.49
Free	514	0.95
Indépendance du Québec	382	0.71
Total valid votes	53,920	97.87
Rejected ballots	1,171	2.13
Registered voters/ estimated turnout	88,018	62.59

=== Châteauguay—Lacolle ===
2021 Canadian federal election: Châteauguay—Lacolle
Party	Candidate	Votes	%	±%	Expenditures
Liberal	Brenda Shanahan	18,029	37.03	-1.36	$52,662.66
Bloc Québécois	Patrick O'Hara	18,017	37.01	-0.16	$32,231.91
Conservative	Pierre Bournaki	5,538	11.01	-0.16	$11,071.20
New Democratic	Hannah Wolker	3,752	7.71	+0.07	$369.79
People's	Jeff Benoit	1,821	3.74	+2.67	$2,883.60
Green	Frédéric Olivier	801	1.65	-2.03	$0.00
Free	André Lafrance	448	0.92	–	$0.00
Indépendance du Québec	Marc Gagnon	277	0.57	-0.18	$0.00
Total valid votes/expense limit		48,683	97.87	–	$110,696.46
Total rejected ballots		1,061	2.13	+0.13	
Turnout		49,744	61.58	-6.64	
Registered voters		79,853			
Liberal hold		Swing		-0.60	
Source: Elections Canada

2019 Canadian federal election: Châteauguay—Lacolle
Party	Candidate	Votes	%	±%	Expenditures
Liberal	Brenda Shanahan	20,118	38.39	-0.70	$40,263.40
Bloc Québécois	Claudia Valdivia	19,479	37.17	+12.81	$3,185.41
Conservative	Hugues Laplante	5,851	11.17	-0.04	none listed
New Democratic	Marika Lalime	4,005	7.64	-15.50	$0.00
Green	Meryam Haddad	1,929	3.68	+1.78	$3,739.15
People's	Jeff Benoit	563	1.07	–	$3,708.72
Indépendance du Québec	Marc Gagnon	393	0.75	–	$0.00
Marxist–Leninist	Pierre Chénier	64	0.12	-0.17	$0.00
Total valid votes/expense limit		52,402	98.00		
Total rejected ballots		1,071	2.00	+0.28	
Turnout		53,473	68.22	-0.99	
Eligible voters		78,384			
Liberal hold		Swing		-6.76	
Source: Elections Canada

2015 Canadian federal election: Châteauguay—Lacolle
Party	Candidate	Votes	%	±%	Expenditures
Liberal	Brenda Shanahan	20,245	39.10	+28.90	$26,214
Bloc Québécois	Sophie Stanké	12,615	24.36	−2.55	$27,153
New Democratic	Sylvain Chicoine (incumbent)	11,986	23.15	-25.57	$27,865
Conservative	Philippe St-Pierre	5,805	11.21	−0.82	$3,357
Green	Jency Mercier	982	1.90	-0.01	$2,348
Marxist–Leninist	Linda Sullivan	149	0.29	+0.06	none listed
Total valid votes/expense limit		51,782	98.27		$208,824
Total rejected, unmarked and declined ballots		909	1.73	–	–
Turnout		52,691	69.21	–	–
Eligible voters		76,129	–	–	–
Liberal gain from New Democratic		Swing		+27.24	

2011 federal election redistributed results
Party	Vote	%
New Democratic	22,116	48.72
Bloc Québécois	12,216	26.91
Conservative	5,462	12.03
Liberal	4,630	10.20
Green	865	1.91
Marxist–Leninist	105	0.23

== See also ==
- List of Canadian electoral districts
- Historical federal electoral districts of Canada
