= Havelock, Quebec =

Havelock
- Township municipality
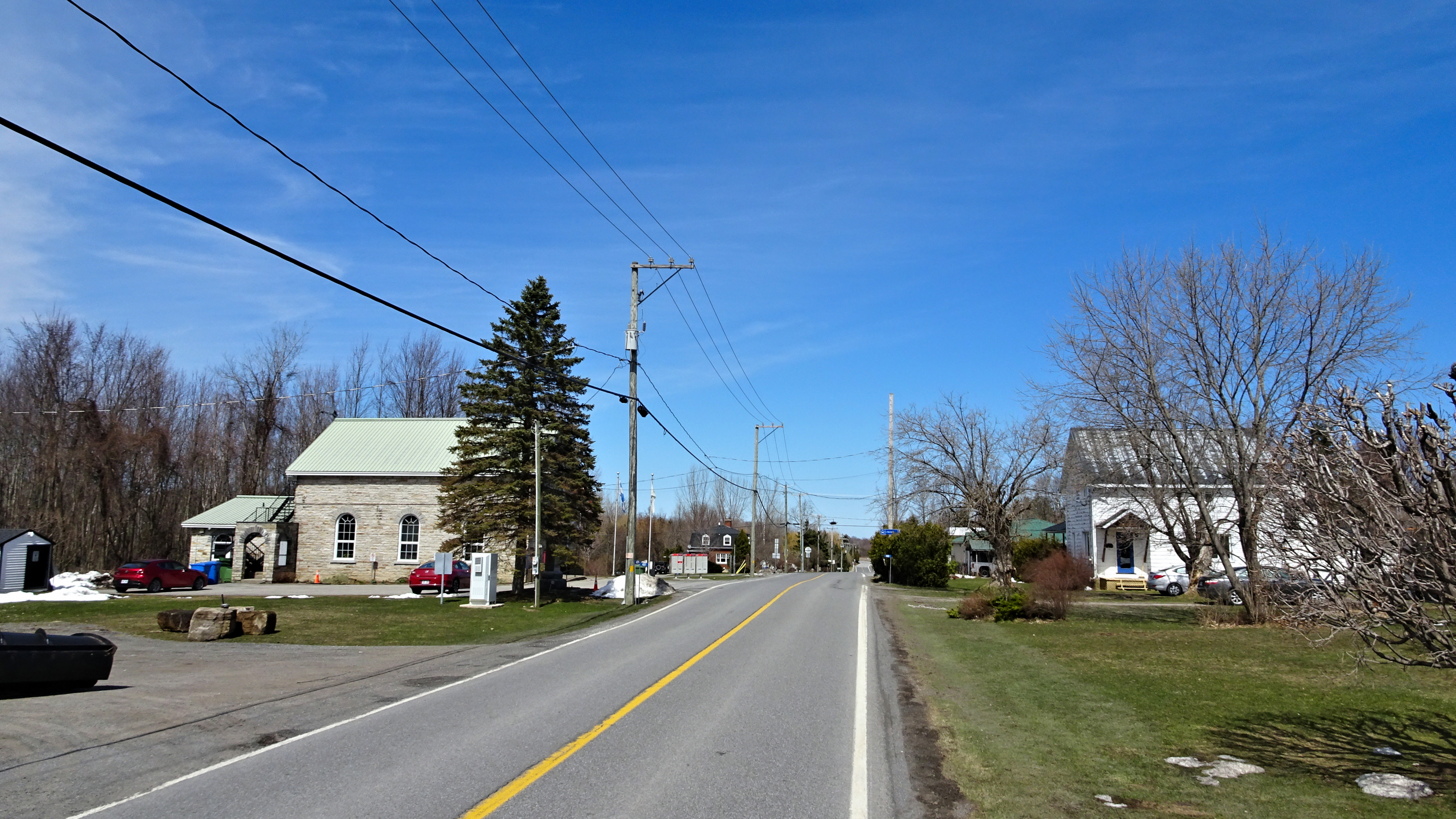

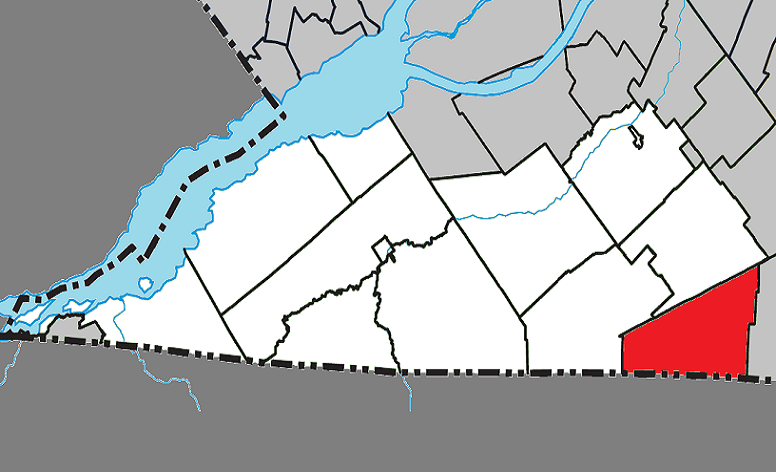
- Location within Le Haut-Saint-Laurent RCM

- Location in southern Quebec
- Coordinates: 45°03′N 73°45′W
- Country: Canada
- Province: Quebec
- Region: Montérégie
- RCM: Le Haut-Saint-Laurent
- Constituted: April 1, 1863
- Named for: Henry Havelock

Government
  - Mayor: Gerald Beaudoin
  - Federal riding: Châteauguay—Les Jardins-de-Napierville
  - Prov. riding: Huntingdon

Area
  - Total: 88.96 km^{2} (34.35 sq mi)
  - Land: 88.92 km^{2} (34.33 sq mi)

Population (2021)
  - Total: 756
  - Density: 8.5/km^{2} (22/sq mi)
  - Pop (2016-21): ▲2.2%
  - Dwellings: 407
- Time zone: UTC−5 (EST)
  - Summer (DST): UTC−4 (EDT)
- Postal code(s): J0S 2C0
- Area codes: 450 and 579
- Highways: R-202 R-203

Havelock is a township in Le Haut-Saint-Laurent Regional County Municipality in southern Quebec, Canada. The population as of the 2021 Canadian census was 756. Neighbouring townships include Franklin to the west, St-Chrysostome to the north and Hemmingford to the east. Havelock's southern boundary is the Canada–United States border with New York State.

Located within Havelock is Covey Hill, one of the northernmost hills of the Adirondack Mountains and the highest point in Le Haut-Saint-Laurent Regional County Municipality.

== History ==
Named after Major-General Sir Henry Havelock, a British general who served in India, the township municipality was created in 1863 from the west end of Hemmingford Township.

A quarry of Potsdam sandstone existed in the 19th and 20th century on Covey Hill. The material was used to repair Parliament Hill in the 20th century when the Nepean quarry was deemed unfit to be worked.

== Geography ==
=== Communities ===
In addition to the namesake community, the following locations reside within the municipality's boundaries:

- Covey Hill (45°01′06″N 73°45′28″W) – a hamlet located 2 kilometres (1.2 miles) north of the US border along Route 203.
- Domaine-Enchanté (45°00′59″N 73°45′58″W) – a cottage community just west of Covey Hill situated on the north shore of Lac-Enchanté.
- Projet-Laplante (45°01′07″N 73°49′41″W) – a hamlet located 5.5 kilometres (3.4 miles) west of Covey Hill.
- Russeltown Flats (45°04′01″N 73°45′41″W) – a hamlet located in the northern portion.
- The Fort (45°02′44″N 73°41′13″W) – a hamlet located in the southeast portion along Route 202.

=== Lakes & rivers ===
The following waterways pass through or are situated within the municipality's boundaries:

- Lac Enchanté (45°00′52″N 73°45′57″W) – a lake situated 2 kilometres (1.2 miles) north of the US border.
- Le Gouffre (45°00′08″N 73°47′15″W) – a small lake southwest of Lac Enchanté.

=== Topographic features ===
- Covey Hill (45°00′59″N 73°47′48″W) – a mountain situated west of the hamlet of Covey Hill. At 345 metres (1,132 feet), it is the highest point in Le Haut-Saint-Laurent.

== Economy ==
=== Arts and culture ===
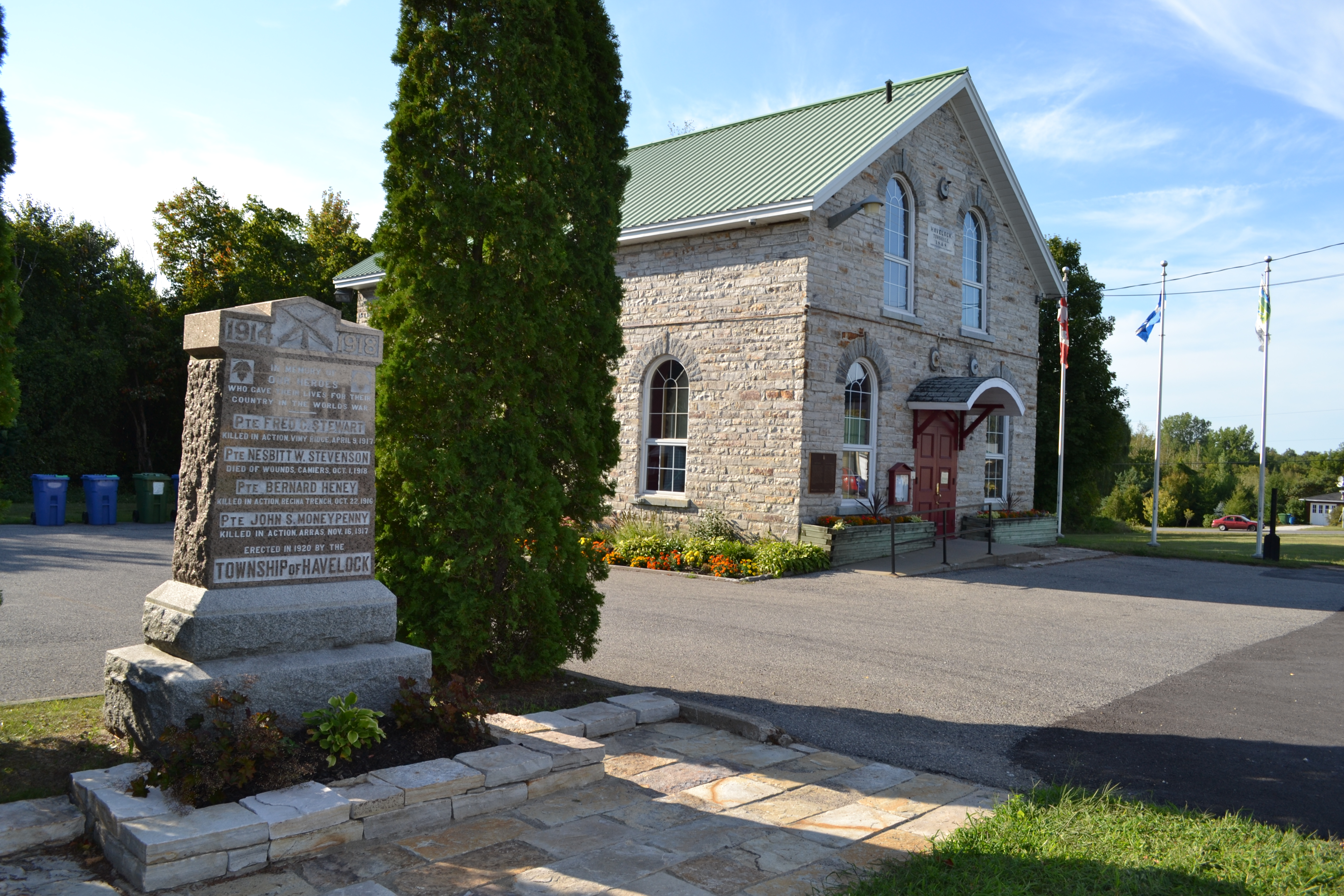
Havelock Town Hall is a National Historic Site of Canada

The town is noted for its annual agricultural fair, Havelock Fair, held every September. It showcases the best the local countryside has to offer. It was founded in 1871 and is one of the oldest fairs in Canada.

== Demographics ==
In the 2021 Census of Population conducted by Statistics Canada, Havelock had a population of 756 living in 352 of its 407 total private dwellings, a change of 2.2% from its 2016 population of 740. With a land area of 88.7 km^{2} (34.2 sq mi), it had a population density of 8.5/km^{2} (22.1/sq mi) in 2021.

Canada census – Havelock community profile

	2021	2016	2011
Population	756 (+2.2% from 2016)	740 (-2.1% from 2011)	756 (-0.7% from 2006)
Land area	88.70 km^{2} (34.25 sq mi)	88.95 km^{2} (34.34 sq mi)	88.92 km^{2} (34.33 sq mi)
Population density	8.5/km^{2} (22/sq mi)	8.3/km^{2} (21/sq mi)	8.5/km^{2} (22/sq mi)
Median age	52.8 (M: 51.6, F: 54.0)	53.5 (M: 52.7, F: 54.2)	51.1 (M: 51.1, F: 51.2)
Private dwellings	407 (total) 352 (occupied)	400 (total) 342 (occupied)	416 (total)
Median household income	$60,400	$47,872	$.N/A

Notes: 2011 income data for this area has been suppressed for data quality or confidentiality reasons.
References: 2021 2016 2011

Historical Census Data - Havelock, Quebec

Year	Pop.	±%
1921	701	—
1931	712	+1.6%
1941	612	−14.0%
1951	623	+1.8%
1956	673	+8.0%
1961	609	−9.5%

Year	Pop.	±%
1966	669	+9.9%
1971	657	−1.8%
1976	737	+12.2%
1981	675	−8.4%
1986	757	+12.1%
1991	738	−2.5%

Year	Pop.	±%
1996	811	+9.9%
2001	794	−2.1%
2006	761	−4.2%
2011	756	−0.7%
2016	740	−2.1%
2021	756	+2.2%

Source: Statistics Canada

Canada Census Mother Tongue - Havelock, Quebec
Census	Total	French			English			French & English			Other		
Year	Responses	Count	Trend	Pop %	Count	Trend	Pop %	Count	Trend	Pop %	Count	Trend	Pop %
2011	750	500	0.0%	66.67%	225	▲2.3%	30.00%	5	▲ n/a%	0.66%	20	▼20.0%	2.67%
2006	745	500	▼9.1%	67.11%	220	▼2.2%	29.53%	0	▼100.0%	0.00%	25	▲ n/a%	3.36%
2001	790	550	▲12.2%	69.62%	225	▼22.4%	28.48%	15	▲50.0%	1.90%	0	▼100.0%	0.00%
1996	810	490	n/a	60.49%	290	n/a	35.80%	10	n/a	1.24%	20	n/a	2.47%

== See also ==
- English River (Chateauguay River tributary)
- List of anglophone communities in Quebec
- List of township municipalities in Quebec
