= Très-Saint-Sacrement =

- Municipality
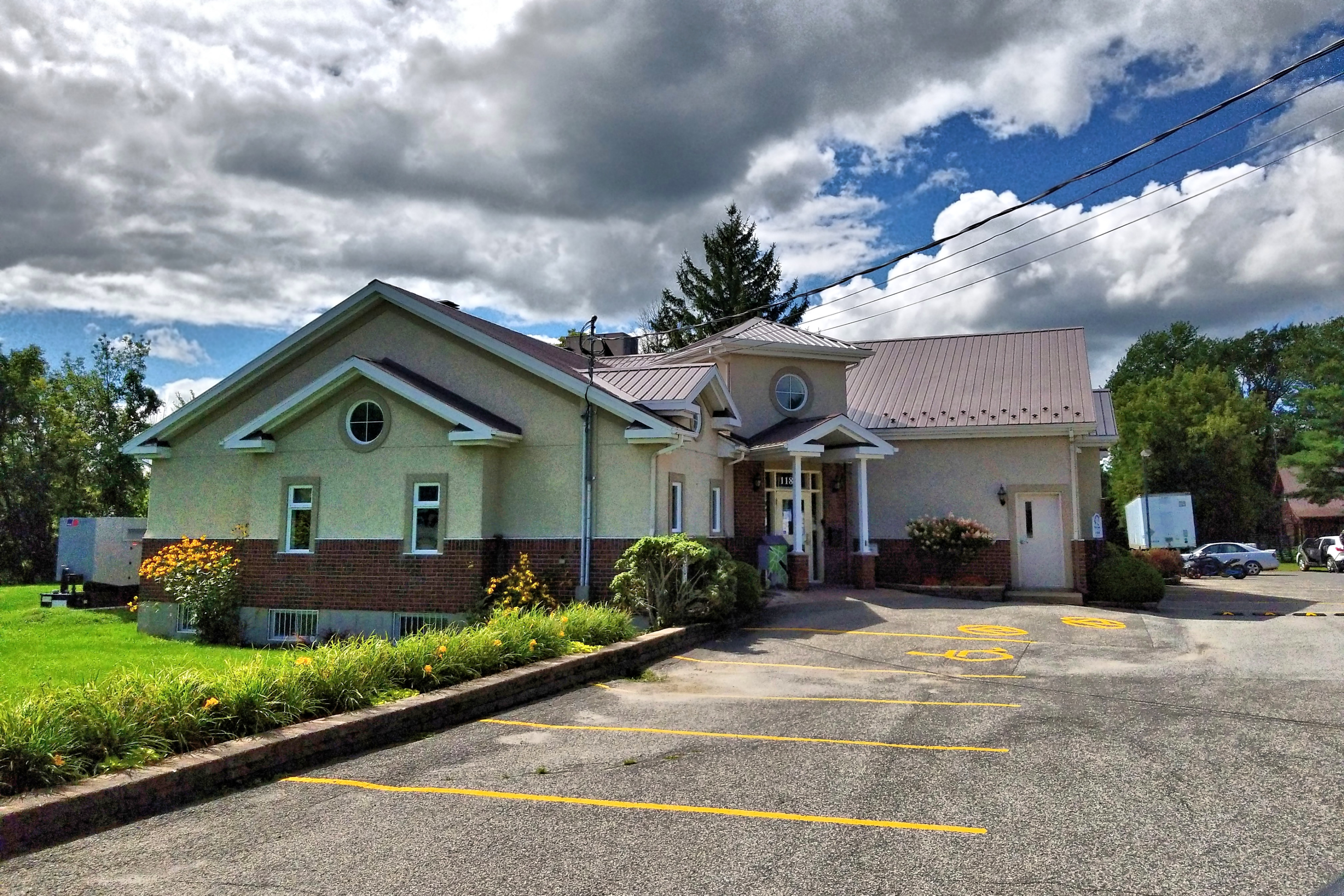
- Municipal hall of Très-Saint-Sacrement

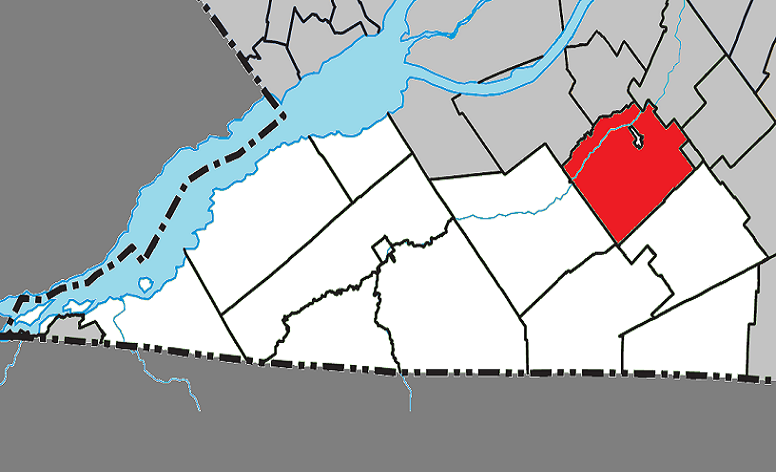
- Location within Le Haut-Saint-Laurent RCM

- Location in southern Quebec
- Coordinates: 45°11′N 73°51′W
- Country: Canada
- Province: Quebec
- Region: Montérégie
- RCM: Le Haut-Saint-Laurent
- Constituted: April 2, 1885

Government
  - Mayor: Agnes McKell
  - Federal riding: Châteauguay—Les Jardins-de-Napierville
  - Prov. riding: Huntingdon

Area
  - Total: 98.94 km^{2} (38.20 sq mi)
  - Land: 97.16 km^{2} (37.51 sq mi)

Population (2021)
  - Total: 1,189
  - Density: 12.2/km^{2} (32/sq mi)
  - Pop (2016-21): ▲0.3%
  - Dwellings: 506
- Time zone: UTC−5 (EST)
  - Summer (DST): UTC−4 (EDT)
- Postal code(s): J0S 1G0
- Area codes: 450 and 579
- Highways: R-138 R-203
- Website: www.tres-st-sacrement.ca

Très-Saint-Sacrement is a municipality located along the Châteauguay River in the Montérégie region of Quebec, Canada. The population as of the 2021 Canadian census was 1,189. Established in 1885, the municipality completely encloses the village of Howick, which was incorporated as a separate entity in 1915.

== Geography ==
=== Communities ===
The following locations reside within the municipality's boundaries:

- Allan's Corners (45°09′36″N 73°55′41″W) – a hamlet located in the central portion along the Châteauguay River and Route 138.
- Bryson (45°08′49″N 73°55′55″W) – a hamlet located in the western portion along the Châteauguay River and Route 138.
- Riverfield (45°09′18″N 73°48′45″W) – a hamlet located south of Howick on Route 203.
- Saint-Pierre (45°07′21″N 73°53′58″W) – a hamlet located in the southwest portion.

=== Lakes & Rivers ===
The following waterways pass through or are situated within the municipality's boundaries:

- English River (Chateauguay River tributary) (Mouth 45°12′48″N 73°49′50″W) – feeds into Rivière Chateauguay.
- Rivière Châteauguay – flows west to east through the municipality.

== History ==
In 1803, Lord Alexander Ellice built a flour mill along the English River (Rivière des Anglais) to encourage settlement of the area. Around 1804, his son George also built a mill on the west bank of the English River, that became a settlement bearing his name, George's Mill, but renamed to Howick circa 1833.

On October 26, 1813, the Battle of the Chateauguay took place at Allan's Corners, a hamlet with a general store and post office where a bridge crossed the Châteauguay River. Canadian and Native forces fought and repelled there an invading American force that was planning to attack Montreal during the War of 1812.

In 1885, the parish municipality was established, taking its name from the parish of Très-Saint-Sacrement, that was formed in 1844. On October 29, 1915, the parish municipality lost part of its territory when its main population centre split off to become the Village Municipality of Howick.. On 2026, the status of Très-Saint-Sacrement changed from a parish municipality to a regular municipality.

== Demographics ==
In the 2021 Census of Population conducted by Statistics Canada, Très-Saint-Sacrement had a population of 1,189 living in 473 of its 506 total private dwellings, a change of 0.3% from its 2016 population of 1,186. With a land area of 97.16 km^{2} (37.51 sq mi), it had a population density of 12.2/km^{2} (31.7/sq mi) in 2021.

Canada census – Très-Saint-Sacrement community profile

	2021	2016	2011
Population	1,189 (+0.3% from 2016)	1,186 (+2.7% from 2011)	1,155 (-4.8% from 2006)
Land area	97.16 km^{2} (37.51 sq mi)	97.53 km^{2} (37.66 sq mi)	98.51 km^{2} (38.03 sq mi)
Population density	12.2/km^{2} (32/sq mi)	12.2/km^{2} (32/sq mi)	11.7/km^{2} (30/sq mi)
Median age	42.8 (M: 42.0, F: 42.8)	42.4 (M: 41.7, F: 42.7)	45.7 (M: 44.6, F: 46.2)
Private dwellings	506 (total) 473 (occupied)	498 (total) 467 (occupied)	483 (total)
Median household income	$77,000	$66,509	$51,354

References: 2021 2016 2011

Historical Census Data - Très-Saint-Sacrement, Quebec

Year	Pop.	±%
1921	1,357	—
1931	1,149	−15.3%
1941	1,261	+9.7%
1951	1,221	−3.2%
1956	1,291	+5.7%
1961	1,343	+4.0%
1966	1,387	+3.3%
1971	1,447	+4.3%
1976	1,379	−4.7%

Year	Pop.	±%
1981	1,417	+2.8%
1986	1,362	−3.9%
1991	1,294	−5.0%
1996	1,283	−0.9%
2001	1,238	−3.5%
2006	1,213	−2.0%
2011	1,155	−4.8%
2016	1,186	+2.7%
2021	1,189	+0.3%

Source: Statistics Canada

Canada Census Mother Tongue - Très-Saint-Sacrement, Quebec
Census	Total	French			English			French & English			Other		
Year	Responses	Count	Trend	Pop %	Count	Trend	Pop %	Count	Trend	Pop %	Count	Trend	Pop %
2011	1,150	605	▲15.2%	52.61%	480	▼20.7%	41.74%	25	▼58.3%	2.17%	40	▲33.3%	3.48%
2006	1,220	525	▼11.8%	43.03%	605	▼0.8%	49.59%	60	▲300.0%	4.92%	30	▼33.3%	2.46%
2001	1,265	595	▲5.3%	47.04%	610	▼10.3%	48.22%	15	▲ n/a%	1.18%	45	0.0%	3.56%
1996	1,290	565	n/a	43.80%	680	n/a	52.71%	0	n/a	0.00%	45	n/a	3.49%

== Local government ==
List of former mayors:

- John Stewart (1885–1886)
- James M. Stewart (1886–1888)
- Louis Turcot (1888–1889)
- Archibald Cameron (1889–1890)
- James Bryson (1890–1892, 1893–1899, 1900–1903, 1905–1907)
- Etienne Merleau (1892–1893)
- Gilbert Hébert (1899–1900)
- Mathias Parent (1903–1905, 1911–1912, 1915–1916, 1921–1923)
- James Angell (1907–1908)
- J. H. Lefebvre (1908–1909)
- Thomas Gabble (1909–1910)
- John McRae (1910–1911, 1914–1915)
- John Cullen (1912–1913)
- Joseph Desgroseillers (1913–1914)
- William Templeton (1916–1917)
- William Mc Clenaghan (1917–1921)
- James Cullen (1923–1925)
- Raoul Lefebvre (1925–1926)
- D. Mc Cormick (1926–1929)
- Alexander Mc Gregor (1929–1933)
- Joseph Parent (1933–1935)
- Andrew Bennie (1935–1937)
- Jean Baptiste Lemieux (1937–1939)
- George Hope (1939–1941)
- Joseph George Alfred Descent (1941–1943)
- James D. Bryson (1943–1945)
- Joseph Laurent Bergevin (1945–1947, 1949–1951)
- John J. Peddie (1947–1949)
- James A. Cullen (1951–1953, 1959)
- Joseph Emile Theophile Bergevin (1953–1955)
- Harold Robertson (1955–1957, 1959–1961)
- John Robinson (1957–1959)
- Dieudonné D'Aoust (1961–1963)
- Wilbert A. Orr (1963–1965)
- Lucien Billette (1965–1967)
- Garnet Barrington (1967–1971)
- Jean Aimé Parent (1971–1979)
- Donald Templeton (1979–1981)
- Joseph André Jean Guy Bergevin (1981–1983)
- Henry W. Welburn (1983–1985)
- Joseph Stephen Fernant Primeau (1985–1989)
- Albert Billette (1989–2009)
- François Rochefort (2009–2017)
- Agnes McKell (2017–present)

== Attractions ==
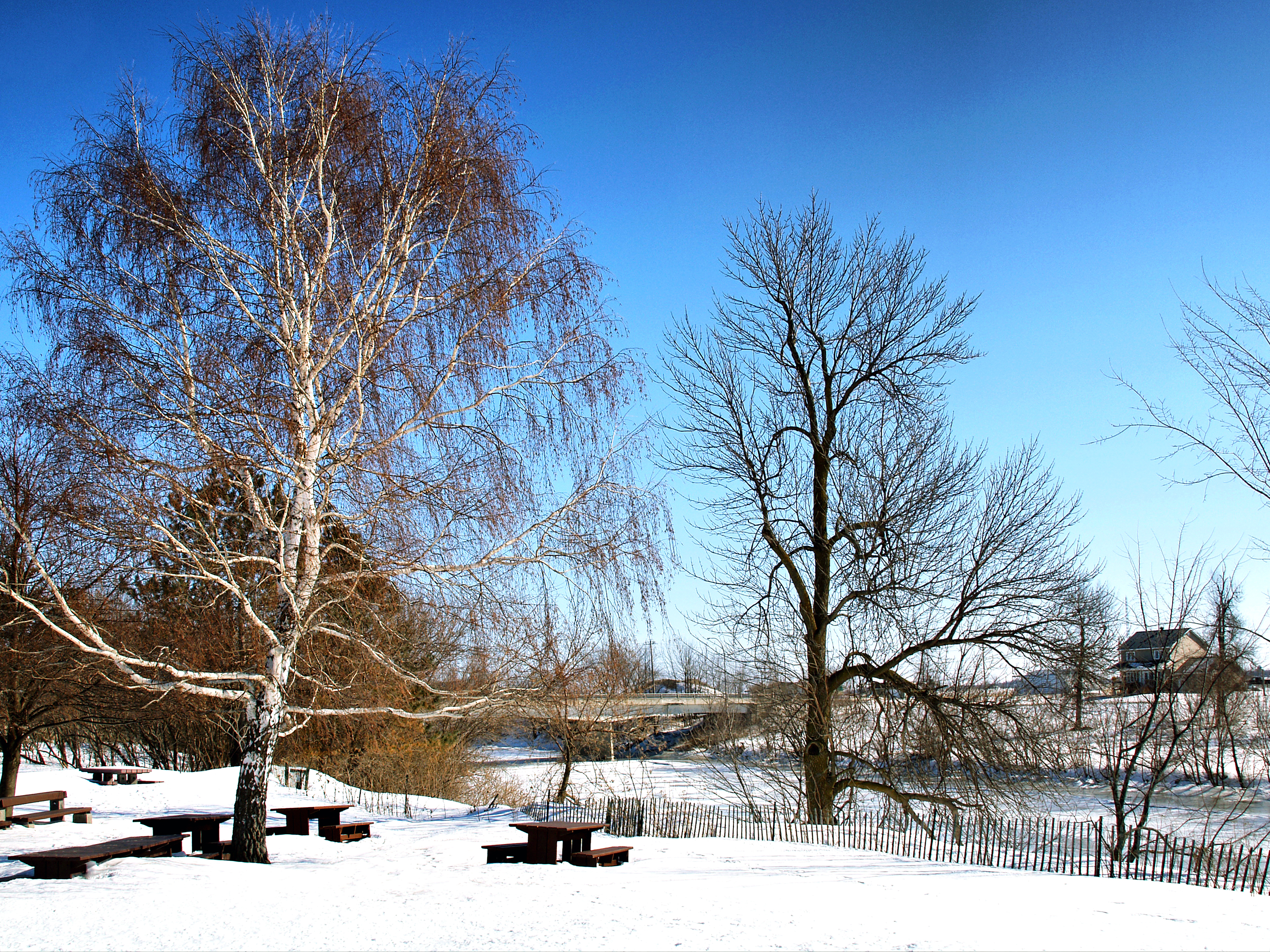
Battle of the Châteauguay National Historic Site

The site of the Battle of the Chateauguay at the hamlet of Allan's Corners is a National Historic Site of Canada, managed by Parks Canada. It commemorates the Canadian victory with guided tours and an interpretation centre.

The Turcot Bridge over the Châteauguay River at Howick is one of the last metal bridges in the region, and classified as a historic monument since 2009. It was originally built in 1889 by a Belgian engineer Gérard Macquet on the property of Louis Turcot, and inaugurated on October 16, 1890. It is only open to pedestrians and cyclists.

== Transportation ==
The CIT du Haut-Saint-Laurent provides commuter and local bus services.

== See also ==
- List of anglophone communities in Quebec
- List of municipalities in Quebec
