= Howick, Quebec =

Howick
- Municipality
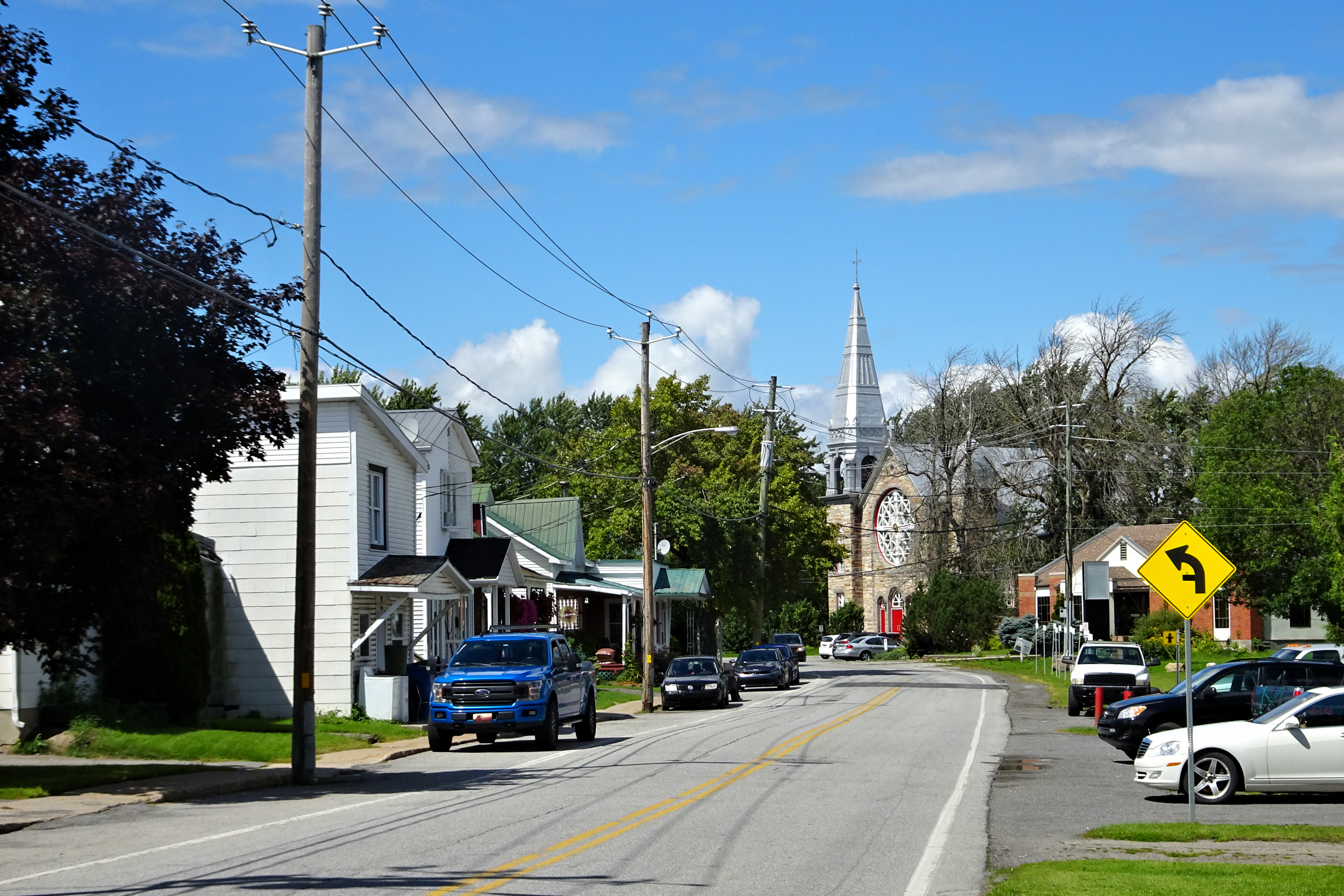

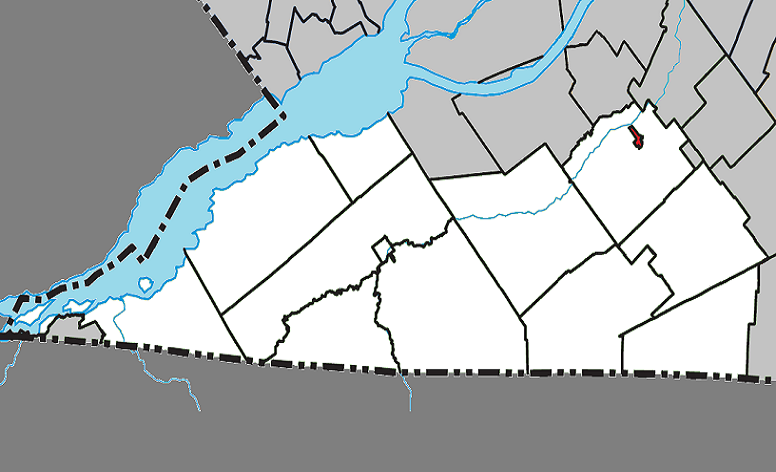
- Location within Le Haut-Saint-Laurent RCM

- Location in southern Quebec
- Coordinates: 45°11′N 73°51′W
- Country: Canada
- Province: Quebec
- Region: Montérégie
- RCM: Le Haut-Saint-Laurent
- Constituted: October 29, 1915

Government
  - Mayor: Richard Raithby
  - Federal riding: Châteauguay—Les Jardins-de-Napierville
  - Prov. riding: Huntingdon

Area
  - Total: 0.96 km^{2} (0.37 sq mi)
  - Land: 0.96 km^{2} (0.37 sq mi)

Population (2021)
  - Total: 850
  - Density: 885/km^{2} (2,290/sq mi)
  - Pop (2016-21): ▲9.3%
  - Dwellings: 366
- Time zone: UTC−5 (EST)
  - Summer (DST): UTC−4 (EDT)
- Postal code(s): J0S 1G0
- Area codes: 450 and 579
- Highways: R-138
- Website: www.villagehowick.com

Howick is the third smallest municipality in the Canadian province of Quebec, located in Le Haut-Saint-Laurent Regional County Municipality. The population as of the 2021 Canadian census was 850. Situated along the English River in the heart of the Châteauguay Valley, it is approximately 50 minutes southwest of Montreal and 20 minutes north of the Canada–United States border.

== Geography ==
=== Lakes & Rivers ===
The following waterways pass through or are situated within the municipality's boundaries:

- English River – runs south to north along Howick's southeast boundary

== History ==
Around 1804, George Ellice, son of Lord Alexander Ellice, built a mill on the west bank of the English River, that became a settlement bearing his name: George's Mill. Circa 1833, the place was known in English as Howick (named after either Charles Grey, 2nd Earl Grey, or his son Henry Grey, 3rd Earl Grey, both known as Viscount Howick), but known in French as Village de la Fourche (French for "Village of the Fork" in refence to the nearby confluence of the Châteauguay and English Rivers).

On October 29, 1915, the Village Municipality of Howick was established when it split off from the Parish Municipality of Très-Saint-Sacrement.

On May 15, 2010, the village municipality changed statutes to become a regular municipality.

== Demographics ==
=== Population ===
Canada census – Howick community profile

	2021	2016	2011
Population	850 (+9.3% from 2016)	778 (+23.5% from 2011)	630 (+4.4% from 2006)
Land area	0.96 km^{2} (0.37 sq mi)	0.97 km^{2} (0.37 sq mi)	0.99 km^{2} (0.38 sq mi)
Population density	885/km^{2} (2,290/sq mi)	803.5/km^{2} (2,081/sq mi)	634.2/km^{2} (1,643/sq mi)
Median age	34.4 (M: 34.8, F: 34.0)	37.1 (M: 34.9, F: 38.9)	39.1 (M: 37.5, F: 40.2)
Private dwellings	366 (total) 347 (occupied)	352 (total)	288 (total)
Median household income	$72,000	$54,016	$38,092

References: 2021 2016 2011

Historical Census Data - Howick, Quebec

Year	Pop.	±%
1921	457	—
1931	471	+3.1%
1941	484	+2.8%
1951	549	+13.4%
1956	560	+2.0%
1961	647	+15.5%
1966	590	−8.8%
1971	575	−2.5%
1976	667	+16.0%

Year	Pop.	±%
1981	639	−4.2%
1986	621	−2.8%
1991	636	+2.4%
1996	617	−3.0%
2001	580	−6.0%
2006	606	+4.5%
2011	630	+4.0%
2016	778	+23.5%
2021	850	+9.3%

Source: Statistics Canada

=== Language ===
Canada Census Mother Tongue - Howick, Quebec
Census	Total	French			English			French & English			Other		
Year	Responses	Count	Trend	Pop %	Count	Trend	Pop %	Count	Trend	Pop %	Count	Trend	Pop %
2016	780	525	▲32.9%	67.3%	225	▲9.8%	28.8%	20	0.0%	2.6%	10	0.0%	1.3%
2011	630	395	▼9.2%	62.7%	205	▲32.3%	32.5%	20	▲ n/a%	3.2%	10	0.0%	1.6%
2006	600	435	▲38.1%	72.5%	155	▼35.4%	25.8%	0	▼100.0%	0.0%	10	▼33.3%	1.7%
2001	580	315	▼14.9%	54.3%	240	▲6.7%	41.4%	10	▼50.0%	1.7%	15	▲ n/a%	2.6%
1996	615	370	n/a	60.2%	225	n/a	36.6%	20	n/a	3.3%	0	n/a	0.0%

== Local government ==
List of former mayors:

- Thomas Gebbie (1915–1919, 1921–1923)
- Egbert G. Mahon (1919–1921)
- Charles Jodoin (1923–1925)
- J. S. Rorison (1925–1927, 1929–1931)
- Oscar Houle (1927–1929)
- Siméon Beaudin (1931–1933, 1939–1941, 1947–1949)
- J. A. Caruthers (1933–1935)
- Napoléon Parent (1935–1937, 1943–1945)
- W. Watson (1937–1939, 1941–1943)
- Syd Stewart (1945–1947)
- W. E. Logan (1949–1951)
- Isidore Jenneau (1951–1953)
- Ralph Reddick (1953–1955)
- Paul Laberge (1955–1957)
- William Brown (1957–1959)
- Léo Parent (1959–1961)
- William McArthur (1961–1963)
- Philippe Brault (1963–1965)
- Clarence Kerr (1965–1967)
- Antoine Meunier (1967–1975)
- Norman Fletcher (1975–1981)
- Roma Myre (1981–1988)
- Arthur Tellier (1988–1993)
- Claude Jodoin (1993–1995)
- Robert Doré (1995–2005)
- Denis Loiselle (2005–2013)
- Richard Raithby (2013–present)

== Transportation ==
The CIT du Haut-Saint-Laurent provides commuter and local bus services.

== See also ==
- Châteauguay River
- List of anglophone communities in Quebec
- List of municipalities in Quebec
