= Franklin, Quebec =

Franklin
- Municipality
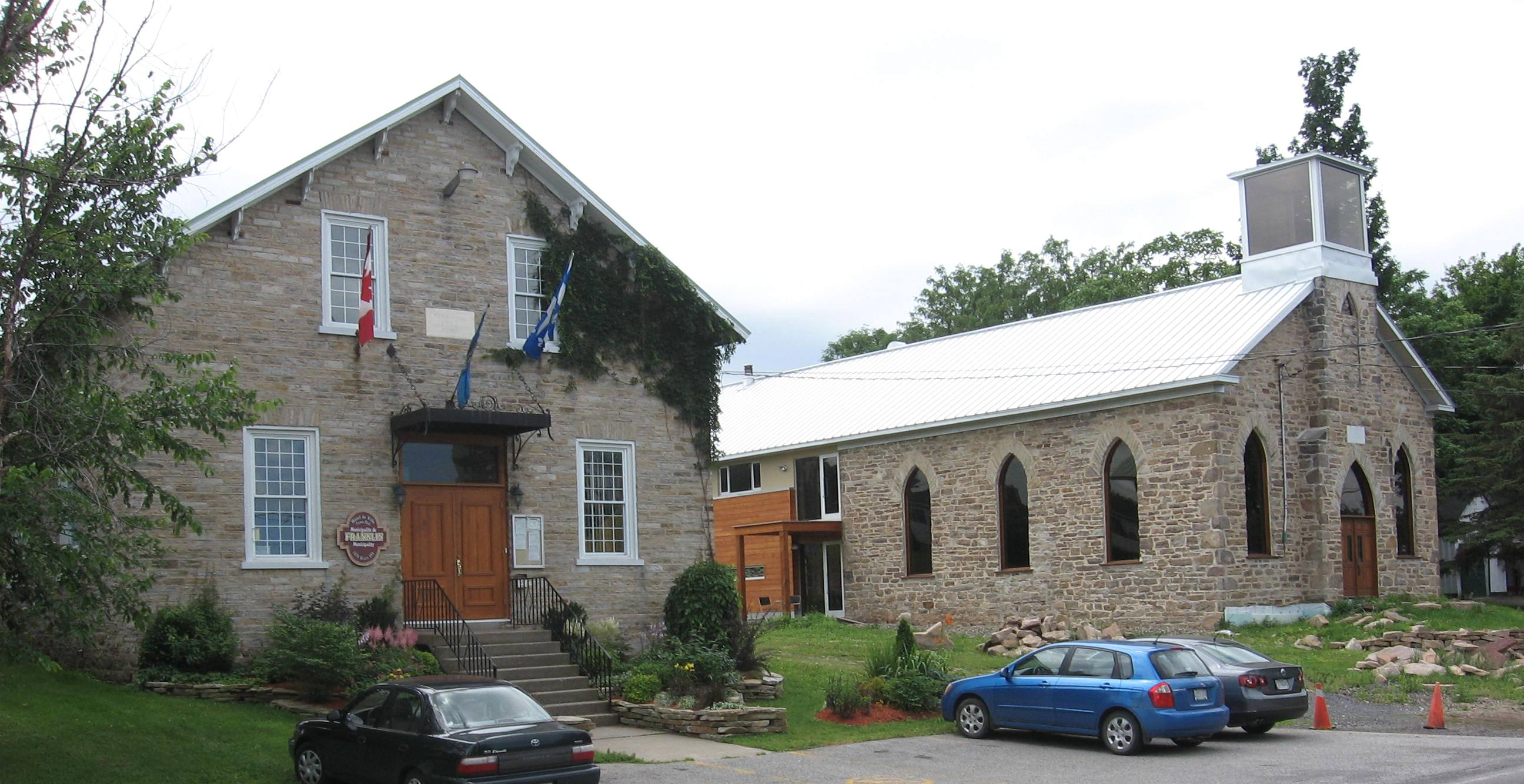

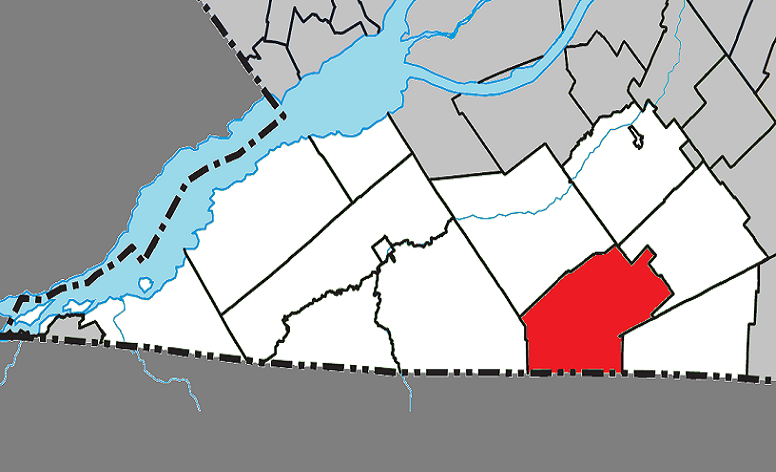
- Location within Le Haut-Saint-Laurent RCM

- Location in southern Quebec
- Coordinates: 45°02′N 73°55′W
- Country: Canada
- Province: Quebec
- Region: Montérégie
- RCM: Le Haut-Saint-Laurent
- Constituted: March 31, 1973

Government
  - Mayor: Yves Métras
  - Federal riding: Châteauguay—Les Jardins-de-Napierville
  - Prov. riding: Huntingdon

Area
  - Total: 112.76 km^{2} (43.54 sq mi)
  - Land: 112.33 km^{2} (43.37 sq mi)

Population (2021)
  - Total: 1,635
  - Density: 14.6/km^{2} (38/sq mi)
  - Pop (2016-21): ▼0.1%
  - Dwellings: 800
- Time zone: UTC−5 (EST)
  - Summer (DST): UTC−4 (EDT)
- Postal code(s): J0S 1E0
- Area codes: 450 and 579
- Highways: R-201 R-202 R-209
- Website: www.municipalitedefranklin.ca

Franklin is a Canadian municipality located in the Montérégie region of Quebec along the Canada–US border. The population as of the 2021 Canadian census was 1,635.

== Geography ==
The municipality is situated along the border with the United States.

Geological features include an east–west forested ridge Covey Hill, a foothill to the northern Adirondack Mountains of New York State, from which the skyscrapers of Montreal are visible to the northeast. Streams run from its northern flank to the Châteauguay Valley where tributaries feed the Châteauguay River that drains into the St. Lawrence River.

=== Communities ===
The following locations reside within the municipality's boundaries:

- Dorea (45°00′21″N 73°55′43″W) – a hamlet situated in the southern portion.
- Franklin Centre (45°01′42″N 73°55′29″W) – a hamlet located at the junction of Route 202 and Route 209. Named for Arctic explorer John Franklin.
- Saint-Antoine-Abbé (45°03′03″N 73°53′21″W) – a village located along Quebec Route 209.

== History ==
The first settler, Asa Smith, came to this area circa 1788. He was followed by American, Irish, and English settlers that arrived in the beginning of the 19th century. In 1857, the Township Municipality of Franklin was founded, named after John Franklin. On June 8, 1860, Franklin lost part of its territory when the Parish Municipality of Saint-Antoine-Abbé was formed (which was renamed in March 1969 to Saint-Antoine-Abbé (Partie Nord-Est)). The Franklin post office opened in 1868.

In 1973, the current municipality was formed when the Township Municipality of Franklin and the Parish Municipality of Saint-Antoine-Abbé-Partie-Nord-Est were merged.

== Demographics ==
=== Population ===
Canada census – Franklin community profile

	2021	2016	2011
Population	1,635 (-0.1% from 2016)	1,636 (-3.1% from 2011)	1,688 (+2.2% from 2006)
Land area	112.33 km^{2} (43.37 sq mi)	112.60 km^{2} (43.48 sq mi)	113.14 km^{2} (43.68 sq mi)
Population density	14.6/km^{2} (38/sq mi)	14.5/km^{2} (38/sq mi)	14.9/km^{2} (39/sq mi)
Median age	48.8 (M: 49.2, F: 47.6)	49.3 (M: 50.0, F: 48.2)	45.0 (M: 44.8, F: 45.3)
Private dwellings	800 (total) 717 (occupied)	777 (total) 700 (occupied)	767 (total)
Median household income	$66,500	$55,296	$45,351

References: 2021 2016 2011

Historical Census Data - Franklin, Quebec

Year	Pop.	±%
1976	1,552	—
1981	1,725	+11.1%
1986	1,630	−5.5%
1991	1,736	+6.5%
1996	1,640	−5.5%

Year	Pop.	±%
2001	1,603	−2.3%
2006	1,651	+3.0%
2011	1,688	+2.2%
2016	1,636	−3.1%
2021	1,635	−0.1%

Source: Statistics Canada

=== Language ===
Canada Census Mother Tongue - Franklin, Quebec
Census	Total	French			English			French & English			Other		
Year	Responses	Count	Trend	Pop %	Count	Trend	Pop %	Count	Trend	Pop %	Count	Trend	Pop %
2011	1,685	1,210	▼0.8%	71.81%	390	▲13.0%	23.14%	35	▲250.0%	2.08%	50	▼33.3%	2.97%
2006	1,650	1,220	▲5.2%	73.94%	345	▼2.8%	20.91%	10	▼60.0%	0.61%	75	▲200.0%	4.54%
2001	1,565	1,160	▼1.7%	74.12%	355	▼9.0%	22.68%	25	▲25.0%	1.60%	25	▼37.5%	1.60%
1996	1,630	1,180	n/a	72.39%	390	n/a	23.93%	20	n/a	1.23%	40	n/a	2.45%

== Economy ==
Apple orchards and maple sugar groves are the principal agriculture near the village of Franklin Centre, Quebec and on the hill while around the village of St. Antoine Abbe in the flat valley there are fertile croplands and dairy farms.

Leahy Orchards is a major employer and exporter of applesauce and Applesnax label products.

== Local government ==
List of former mayors since formation of current municipality:

1. Joseph Faille (1973–1974)
2. Jean Guy Latreille (1974–1981)
3. Joseph Wilfrid Huet (1981–1982)
4. Joseph Jean Gilles Wilbrod Bourdeau (1982–1988)
5. Jean Laplante (1988–1996)
6. Georges Daigle (1996–1997)
7. Pierre Barrière (1997–2005)
8. Suzanne Yelle Blair (2005–2017)
9. Douglas Brooks (2017–2021)
10. Yves Métras (2021–present)

== Attractions ==
"Chemin de Covey Hill" (Covey Hill road) is considered to be one of the premier cycling roads in southern Quebec. This is due to the impressive climb between Havelock and Franklin Centre, the scenic views of the St. Lawrence and Richelieu river valleys, as well as a good quality road surface. This is the first road north of the US-Canada border.

== See also ==
- List of anglophone communities in Quebec
- List of municipalities in Quebec
