= Le Haut-Saint-Laurent Regional County Municipality =

Le Haut-Saint-Laurent
- Regional county municipality
- Location in province of Quebec
- Coordinates: 45.08°N 74.17°W
- Country: Canada
- Province: Quebec
- Region: Montérégie
- Effective: January 1, 1982
- County seat: Huntingdon

Government
  - Type: Prefecture
  - Prefect: Alain Castagner

Area
  - Total: 1,242.20 km^{2} (479.62 sq mi)
  - Land: 1,173.51 km^{2} (453.09 sq mi)

Population (2016)
  - Total: 22,454
  - Density: 19.1/km^{2} (49/sq mi)
  - Change 2011–2016: ▲5.9%
  - Dwellings: 12,016
- Population excludes incompletely enumerated First Nations reserves
- Time zone: UTC−5 (EST)
  - Summer (DST): UTC−4 (EDT)
- Area codes: 450 and 579
- Website: www.mrchsl.com

Le Haut-Saint-Laurent (French pronunciation: [lə o sɛ̃ lɔʁɑ̃], lit. 'Upper Saint Lawrence') is a regional county municipality in southwestern Quebec, Canada, in the Montérégie region. Its seat is in Huntingdon. It is named for the Saint Lawrence River, which forms its western and its northwestern boundaries.

== History ==
The RCM was formed on January 1, 1982, from most of historic Huntingdon County.

== Subdivisions ==
There are 13 subdivisions and one native reserve within the RCM:

Cities & Towns (1)

- Huntingdon

Municipalities (8)

- Elgin
- Franklin
- Hinchinbrooke
- Howick
- Ormstown
- Saint-Anicet
- Saint-Chrysostome
- Sainte-Barbe
- Très-Saint-Sacrement

Townships (3)

- Dundee
- Godmanchester
- Havelock

Native Reserves (1)
(not associated with RCM)

- Akwesasne

== Demographics ==
=== Population ===
Canada census – Le Haut-Saint-Laurent community profile

	2021	2016	2011
Population	22,213 (-1.1% from 2016)	22,454 (+5.9% from 2011)	21,197 (-3.4% from 2006)
Land area	1,168.08 km^{2} (451.00 sq mi)	1,173.51 km^{2} (453.09 sq mi)	1,174.00 km^{2} (453.28 sq mi)
Population density	19/km^{2} (49/sq mi)	19.1/km^{2} (49/sq mi)	18.1/km^{2} (47/sq mi)
Median age	49.6 (M: 48.8, F: 50.4)	48.4 (M: 48.0, F: 48.8)	47.1 (M: 46.7, F: 47.6)
Private dwellings	11,446 (total) 9,895 (occupied)	12,016 (total)	10,744 (total)
Median household income	$63,600	$50,777	$45,307

References: 2021 2016 2011

Historical Census Data - Le Haut-Saint-Laurent Regional County Municipality, Quebec

Year	Pop.	±%
1991	21,864	—
1996	22,007	+0.7%
2001	21,851	−0.7%

Year	Pop.	±%
2006	21,943	+0.4%
2011	21,197	−3.4%
2016	22,454	+5.9%

=== Language ===
Canada Census Mother Tongue - Le Haut-Saint-Laurent Regional County Municipality
Census	Total	French			English			French & English			Other		
Year	Responses	Count	Trend	Pop %	Count	Trend	Pop %	Count	Trend	Pop %	Count	Trend	Pop %
2016	22,160	14,185	▲1.5%	64.0%	6,730	▲9.4%	30.4%	400	▲15.9%	1.64%	845	▲65.7%	3.8%
2011	20,985	13,980	▼4.7%	66.62%	6,150	▲1.7%	29.31%	345	▲16.9%	1.64%	510	▼29.7%	2.43%
2006	21,735	14,665	▲3.6%	67.47%	6,050	▼4.9%	27.84%	295	▼37.2%	1.36%	725	▲20.8%	3.34%
2001	21,590	14,160	▲1.8%	65.59%	6,360	▼9.2%	29.46%	470	▲44.6%	2.18%	600	▲23.7%	2.78%
1996	21,730	13,915	n/a	64.04%	7,005	n/a	32.24%	325	n/a	1.50%	485	n/a	2.23%

== Transportation ==
=== Access Routes ===
Highways and numbered routes that run through the municipality, including external routes that start or finish at the county border:

- Autoroutes
  - None
- Principal Highways
  - R-132
  - R-138
- Secondary Highways
  - R-201
  - R-202
  - R-203
  - R-209
- External Routes
  - NY 30
  - NY 189
  - NY 374

== See also ==
- List of regional county municipalities and equivalent territories in Quebec
