= Saint-Chrysostome, Quebec =

Saint-Chrysostome
- Municipality
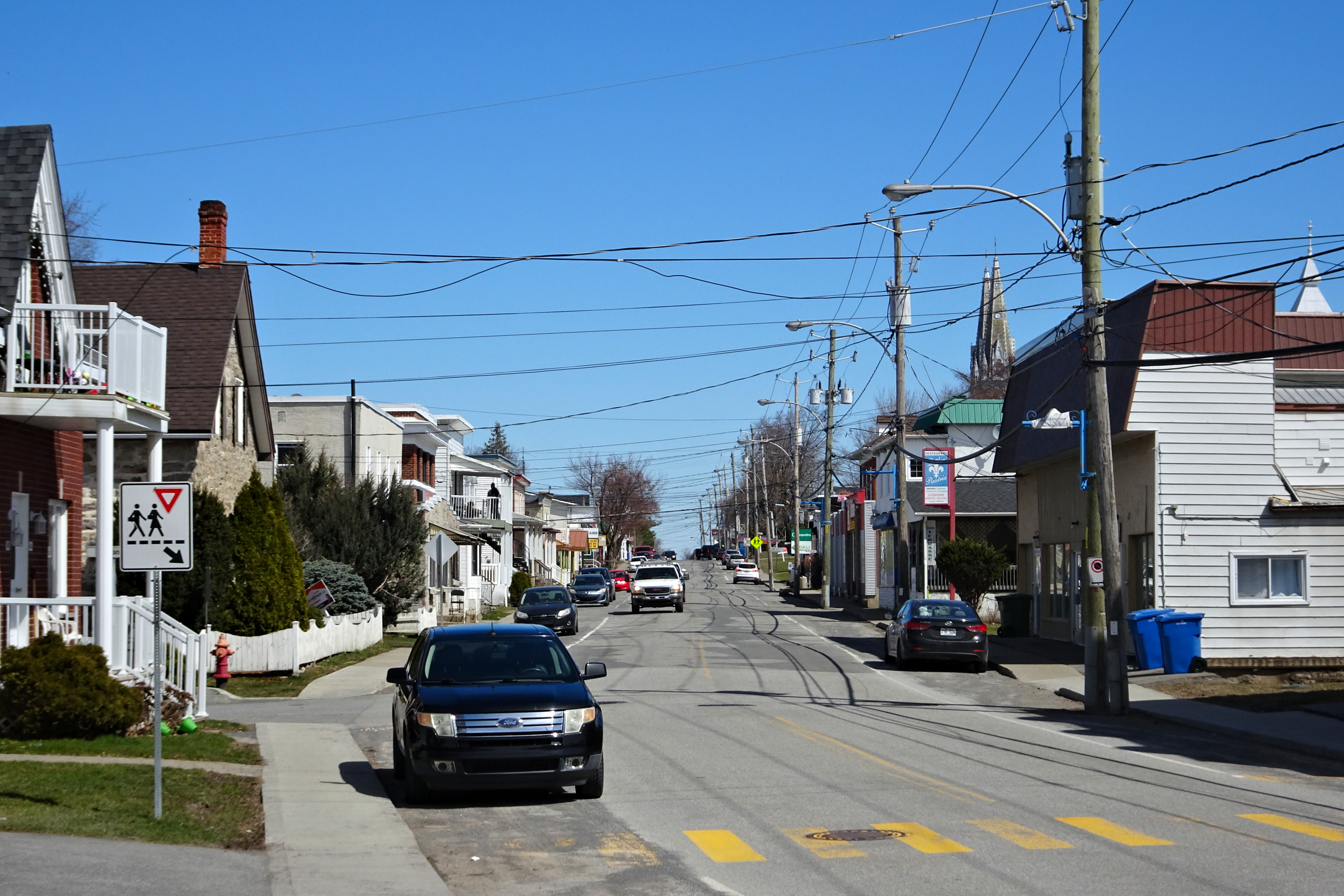

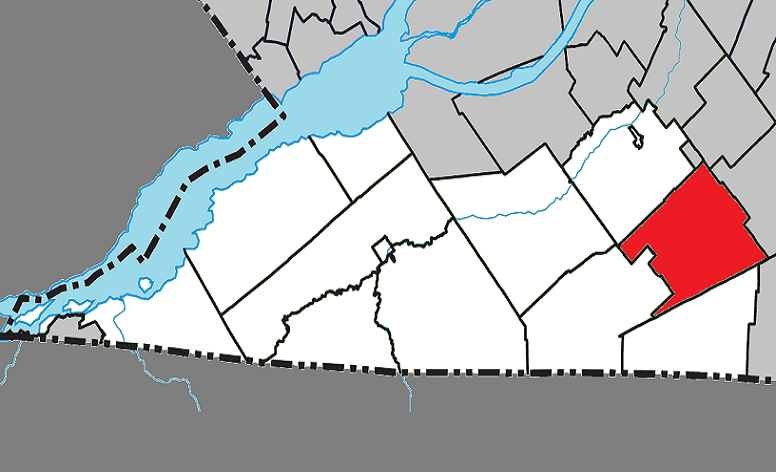
- Location within Le Haut-Saint-Laurent RCM

- Location in southern Quebec
- Coordinates: 45°06′N 73°46′W
- Country: Canada
- Province: Quebec
- Region: Montérégie
- RCM: Le Haut-Saint-Laurent
- Constituted: September 29, 1999

Government
  - Mayor: Steve Laberge
  - Federal riding: Châteauguay—Les Jardins-de-Napierville
  - Prov. riding: Huntingdon

Area
  - Total: 100.49 km^{2} (38.80 sq mi)
  - Land: 100.20 km^{2} (38.69 sq mi)

Population (2021)
  - Total: 2,582
  - Density: 25.8/km^{2} (67/sq mi)
  - Pop (2016-21): ▼2.4%
  - Dwellings: 1,184
- Time zone: UTC−5 (EST)
  - Summer (DST): UTC−4 (EDT)
- Postal code(s): J0S 1R0
- Area codes: 450 and 579
- Highways: R-203 R-209
- Website: www.mun-sc.ca

Saint-Chrysostome (French pronunciation: [sɛ̃ kʁizɔstɔm]) is a municipality in south-west Quebec, Canada in the regional county municipality of Haut-Saint-Laurent in the Montérégie administrative region. The municipality was created by the amalgamation of Saint-Chrysostome village with the parish of Saint-Jean-Chrysostome on September 29, 1999. The population as of the 2021 Canadian census was 2,582.

== Geography ==
=== Communities ===
In addition to the namesake main population centre, the following locations reside within the municipality's boundaries:

- Aubrey (45°08′35″N 73°47′29″W) – a hamlet located on the west shore of Rivière-des-Anglais.

=== Lakes and rivers ===
The following waterways pass through or are situated within the municipality's boundaries:

- Rivière des Anglais – flows in a south-north direction.
- Rivière Noire (Mouth 45°06′01″N 73°45′49″W) – tributary of Rivière des Anglais.

== History ==
In 1800, the area was surveyed and assigned the name Russelltown, after Russell Ellice, son of Lord Alexander Ellice who then owned the Seignory of Beauharnois. In 1828, the first settlers began to arrive.

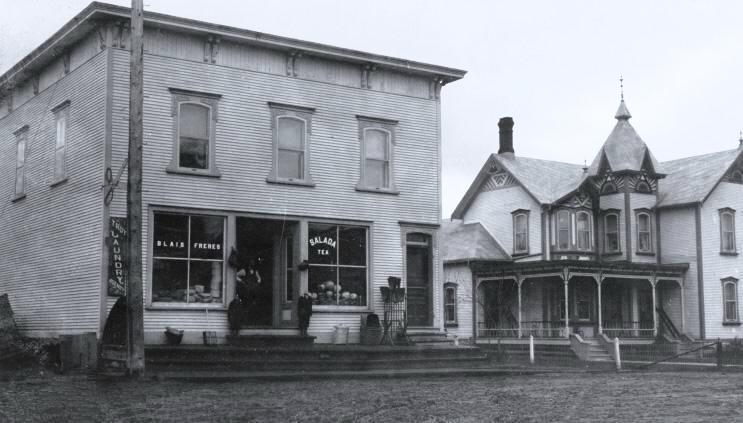
Saint-Chrysostome, 1910

In 1843, the parish of Saint-Jean-Chrysostome(-de-Russelltown), named in honour of John Chrysostom, was created when it separated from Sainte-Martine. In 1845, the Municipality of Russeltown was formed, but dissolved in 1847. In 1851, its post office opened. The municipality was reestablished on July 1, 1855, and changed name and status in August 1858 to become the Parish Municipality of Saint Jean Chrysostome (orthography was adjusted to include hyphens in 1969).

In 1902, the main population centre split off from the parish municipality when it became the Village Municipality of Saint-Chrysostôme (spelled without circumflex since 1969).

On September 29, 1999, the Village Municipality of Saint-Chrysostome and the Parish Municipality Saint-Jean-Chrysostome were merged to form the current municipality.

== Demographics ==
=== Population ===
Canada census – Saint-Chrysostome community profile

	2021	2016	2011
Population	2,582 (-2.4% from 2016)	2,645 (+4.9% from 2011)	2,522 (-2.4% from 2006)
Land area	100.20 km^{2} (38.69 sq mi)	100.40 km^{2} (38.76 sq mi)	99.95 km^{2} (38.59 sq mi)
Population density	25.8/km^{2} (67/sq mi)	26.3/km^{2} (68/sq mi)	25.2/km^{2} (65/sq mi)
Median age	46.8 (M: 46.0, F: 47.6)	44.6 (M: 43.8, F: 45.3)	43.3 (M: 43.2, F: 43.3)
Private dwellings	1,184 (total) 1,105 (occupied)	1,167 (total) 1,107 (occupied)	1,097 (total)
Median household income	$63,200	$51,657	$55,773

References: 2021 2016 2011

Historical Census Data - Saint-Chrysostome, Quebec

Year	Pop.	±%
1976	2,485	—
1981	2,541	+2.3%
1986	2,441	−3.9%
1991	2,601	+6.6%
1996	2,587	−0.5%

Year	Pop.	±%
2001	2,590	+0.1%
2006	2,584	−0.2%
2011	2,522	−2.4%
2016	2,645	+4.9%
2021	2,582	−2.4%

Population amounts prior to 1999 are total of Saint-Chrysostome (village) and Saint-Jean-Chrysostome (parish).
Source: Statistics Canada

=== Language ===
Canada Census Mother Tongue - Saint-Chrysostome, Quebec
Census	Total	French			English			French & English			Other		
Year	Responses	Count	Trend	Pop %	Count	Trend	Pop %	Count	Trend	Pop %	Count	Trend	Pop %
2011	2,515	2,270	▼3.0%	90.26%	180	0.0%	7.16%	30	▲200.0%	1.19%	35	▼30.0%	1.39%
2006	2,580	2,340	▼1.1%	90.70%	180	▲2.9%	6.98%	10	0.0%	0.39%	50	▲42.9%	1.94%
2001	2,585	2,365	▼0.2%	91.49%	175	▲6.1%	6.77%	10	▲ n/a%	0.39%	35	▲250.0%	1.35%
1996+	2,545	2,370	n/a	93.12%	165	n/a	6.48%	0	n/a	0.00%	10	n/a	0.39%
Notes: (+) Pre-merger combined population totals for Saint-Chrysostome (village) and Saint-Jean-Chrysostome (parish).

== Local government ==
List of former mayors since formation of current municipality:

- Gilles Bigras (2000–2009)
- Jocelyne Lefort (2009–2013)
- Gilles Dagenais (2013–2021)
- Steve Laberge (2021–present)

== See also ==
- List of municipalities in Quebec
