= New Frontiers School Board =

School board in Montérégie, Quebec, Canada

Location
- 214 McLeod Street, Châteauguay, Quebec J6J 2H4, Tel 450-691-1440 Montérégie Canada
- Coordinates: 45.36383°N 73.73032°W

District information
- Superintendent: Mike Helm
- Chair of the board: John Ryan
- Schools: 12 elementary schools 2 high schools
- Budget: CA$? million

Other information
- Website: www.nfsb.qc.ca

The New Frontiers School Board (NFSB, French: Commission scolaire New-Frontiers, CSNF) is an English-language school board in the province of Quebec. The school board was formerly known as the Chateauguay Valley English Protestant School Board until the Province of Quebec opted for linguistic, rather than Roman Catholic and Protestant, school boards.

It was renamed to reflect the regions that were initially placed under the oversight of the NFSB; however, the board's boundaries have returned to their original scope.

The territory borders the United States to the south, Ontario to the west, the St. Lawrence River to the north, and Kahnawake to the east.

== List of schools ==
This school board oversees 10 elementary schools, 2 secondary schools, and 3 adult and vocational centres, with over 4,800 students enrolled altogether.

=== Elementary schools ===
- Centennial Park Elementary School (Châteauguay, Quebec)
- Franklin Elementary School (Franklin Centre, Quebec)
- Gault Institute (Salaberry-de-Valleyfield, Quebec)
- Harmony Elementary School (Châteauguay, Quebec)
- Hemmingford Elementary School (Hemmingford, Quebec)
- Howick Elementary School (Howick, Quebec)
- Heritage (formerly the Academy and St. Joseph) (Huntingdon, Quebec)
- Mary Gardner Elementary School (Châteauguay, Quebec)
- Ormstown Elementary School (Ormstown, Quebec)
- St. Willibrord Elementary School (Châteauguay, Quebec)

=== High schools ===
- Chateauguay Valley Regional High School (Ormstown, Quebec)
- Howard S. Billings Regional High School (Châteauguay, Quebec)

=== Other schools ===
- Chateauguay Valley Career Education Centre (CVCEC) (Ormstown, Quebec)
- Nova Career Centre (Châteauguay, Quebec)
- Huntingdon Adult Education and Community Centre (HAECC) (Huntingdon, Quebec)

== See also ==
- Riverside School Board
- Eastern Townships School Board
