= Chateauguay (disambiguation) =

Châteauguay is a suburb of Montreal.

Chateauguay or Chateaugay may also refer to:

== Places ==
=== Chateauguay / Châteauguay ===
- Châteauguay River, flowing in New York State and South-West of Quebec
- Chateauguay Valley
- Chateauguay River, a tributary of the Caniapiscau River, in Nord-du-Québec, Québec, Canada

=== Chateaugay / Châteaugay ===
- Chateaugay (village), New York
- Chateaugay (town), New York
- Châteaugay, a commune of the Puy-de-Dôme Department in France

== Electoral districts in Quebec, Canada ==
- Châteauguay (federal electoral district), former federal electoral district
- Châteauguay—Huntingdon, former federal electoral district
- Châteauguay—Huntingdon—Laprairie, former federal electoral district
- Châteauguay—Saint-Constant, former federal electoral district
- Châteauguay—Lacolle, current federal electoral district
- Châteauguay (provincial electoral district)

== Other uses ==
- Charles le Moyne de Longueuil et de Châteauguay (1626–1685), French-born soldier and Lord in New France
- Battle of the Chateauguay
- HMCS Chateauguay, the Joint Support Ship Project Queenston-class ship
- Chateaugay (horse) (1960–1985), American Thoroughbred racehorse
- Chateauguay River, New York
