= Rivière aux Outardes =

Rivière aux Outardes or Rivière-aux-Outardes (French for "Geese River") may refer to the following rivers and place all in Quebec, Canada:

- Rivière aux Outardes (North Shore), river in Côte-Nord region
- Rivière aux Outardes (Chateauguay River), a stream in Montérégie
  - Rivière aux Outardes Est, a tributary of above
- Rivière aux Outardes (Saguenay River), a stream in Saguenay–Lac-Saint-Jean
- Rivière-aux-Outardes, Quebec, an unorganized territory in Côte-Nord

== See also ==
- Outarde (disambiguation)
