= Little Trout River (New York) =

Location
- Country: United States
- State: New York State
- Region: Adirondack Park (New York State)
- Region: Franklin County, New York

Physical characteristics
- Source
  - location: Adirondack Park
- Mouth
  - location: Franklin County, New York, New York State, (United States)
- Length: 19.7 km (12.2 mi)

Basin features
- Progression: Trout River (New York, Quebec) - Châteauguay River - Saint Lawrence River
- River system: Saint Lawrence River
- Tributaries
  - right: Alder Brook

The Little Trout River is a tributary of the Trout River, flowing in Adirondack Park, in Franklin County, New York, in New York State, in United States.

This valley is mainly served in New York, the nearby road is Constable Street and State Highway 30.

The river surface is generally frozen from mid-December to the end of March. Safe circulation on the ice is generally done from the end of December to the beginning of March. The water level of the river varies with the seasons and the precipitation.

== Geography ==
The small Trout River rises at the mouth of a small lake located between Soulia Mountain and Baldy Mountain in the Adirondack Mountains, in Adirondack Park. This source is located 1.7 kilometres (1.1 mi) southwest of Lower Chateauguay Lake, 6.0 kilometres (3.7 mi) south of the Canada-US border, and 4.4 kilometres (2.7 mi) north-west of Upper Chateauguay Lake.

From its source in Adirondack Park, the Little Trout River descends 19.7 kilometres (12.2 mi), according to the following segments:

- 4.9 kilometres (3.0 mi) towards the west in a deep valley, crossing a zone of marsh by bending towards the north in order to circumvent the Soulia Mountain, until a stream (coming from the east);
- 4.9 kilometres (3.0 mi) north-west in a generally deep valley, to the village bridge of Burke;
- 4.1 kilometres (2.5 mi) north-west in a generally deep valley, to the outlet of Alder Brook;
- 5.8 kilometres (3.6 mi) first towards the west, curving towards the northwest forming a few loops at the end of the segment, until its mouth.

The Little Trout River flows into a bend on the east bank of the Trout River, 2.9 kilometres (1.8 mi) south of the Canada border. From there, the current descends the course of the Trout river on 30.9 kilometres (19.2 mi) generally towards the north, then the northeast; then the course of the Châteauguay river on 60.3 kilometres (37.5 mi) to the south shore of lac Saint-Louis, at Châteauguay, southwest of Montreal .

== See also ==
- Adirondack Park,
- Franklin County, New York
- New York State
- Trout River
- Châteauguay River, a stream
- List of rivers of New York
