= Dewittville =

- Unincorporated community
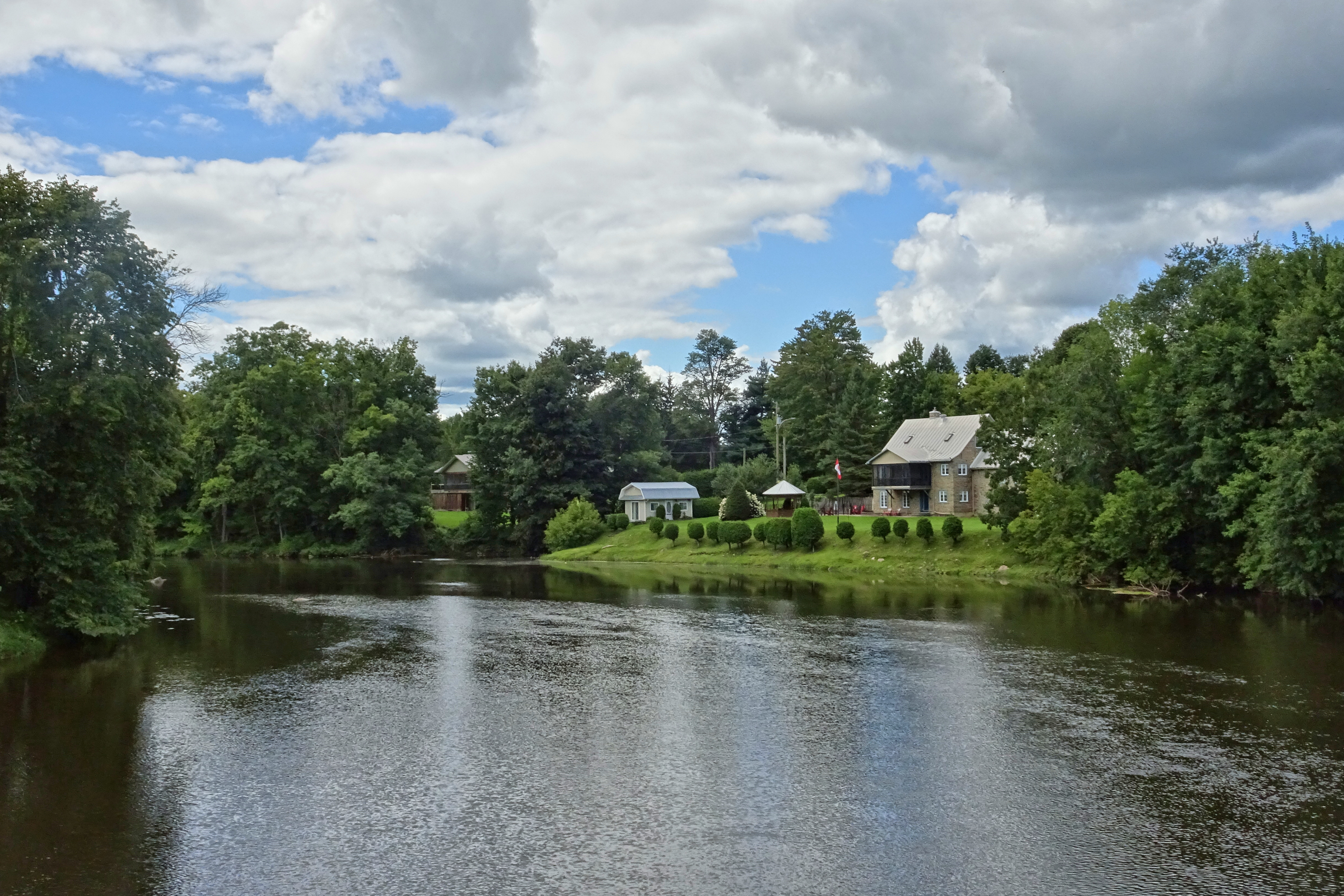

- Location within Southern Quebec
- Coordinates: 45°06′50″N 74°05′42″W
- Country: Canada
- Province: Quebec
- Region: Montérégie
- RCM: Le Haut-Saint-Laurent
- Municipality: Godmanchester
- Named for: Jacob De Witt
- Time zone: UTC-5 (EST)
  - Summer (DST): UTC-4 (EDT)
- Postal code: J0S 1C0
- Area codes: 450, 579, and 354

Dewittville is a small community situated on the Châteauguay River in southern Quebec, Canada, between the towns of Huntingdon and Ormstown, approximately 70 km south-west of Montreal.

In 1829, Jacob De Witt acquired a sawmill and 130 acres (53 ha) of land at Portage, which was later renamed to Dewittville. The old grist mill, dam, and Châteauguay River are notable attractions.
