= Little Trout River =

Little Trout River may refer to:

- Little Trout River (Michigan), a tributary of Lake Huron in Presque Isle County, Michigan, United States
- Little Trout River (New York), a tributary of the Trout River in New York, United States
- Little Trout River (Florida), a tributary of the Trout River near Jacksonville, Florida, United States
