= Godmanchester, Quebec =

Godmanchester
- Township municipality
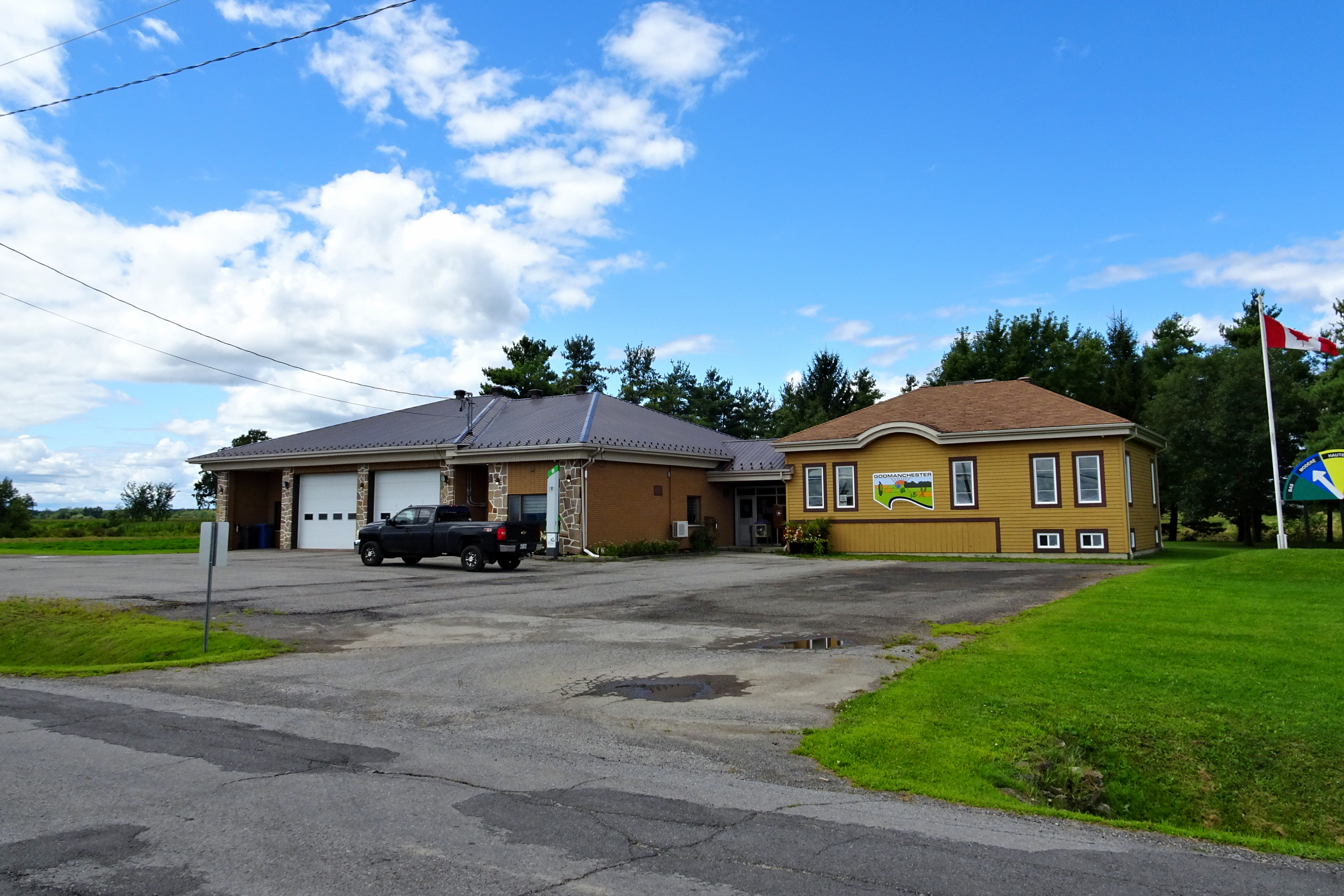
- Godmanchester town hall

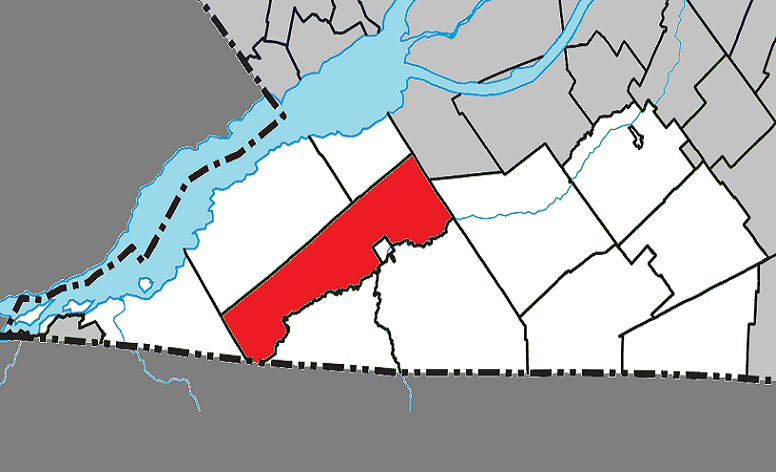
- Location within Le Haut-Saint-Laurent RCM

- Location in southern Quebec
- Coordinates: 45.08°N 74.25°W
- Country: Canada
- Province: Quebec
- Region: Montérégie
- RCM: Le Haut-Saint-Laurent
- Constituted: July 1, 1855
- Named after: Godmanchester

Government
  - Mayor: Judith Fouquet
  - Federal riding: Salaberry—Suroît
  - Prov. riding: Huntingdon

Area
  - Total: 138.52 km^{2} (53.48 sq mi)
  - Land: 138.66 km^{2} (53.54 sq mi)
- There is an apparent contradiction between two authoritative sources.

Population (2021)
  - Total: 1,403
  - Density: 10.1/km^{2} (26/sq mi)
  - Pop (2016-21): ▲0.6%
  - Dwellings: 621
- Time zone: UTC−5 (EST)
  - Summer (DST): UTC−4 (EDT)
- Postal code(s): J0S 1H0 & J0S 1L0
- Area codes: 450 and 579
- Highways: R-138 R-202
- Website: godmanchester.ca

Godmanchester is a township municipality located in Le Haut-Saint-Laurent Regional County Municipality in the Montérégie region of Quebec, Canada. The population as of the 2021 Canadian census was 1,403 The southeast part of the township is mostly delineated by the Châteauguay River, while the south end borders with Franklin County, New York.

It was named after Godmanchester, England, in 1811.

== History ==
Its first settlers were Canadian soldiers who were discharged at the time of the American Revolution in the late 18th century. The geographic township of Godmanchester was first surveyed in 1811, and named by Surveyor William Chewett after the English town Godmanchester. In 1845, the Township Municipality of Godmanchester was established, but abolished in 1847. It was reestablished in 1855.

== Geography ==
The municipality is situated along the Canada–United States border.

=== Communities ===
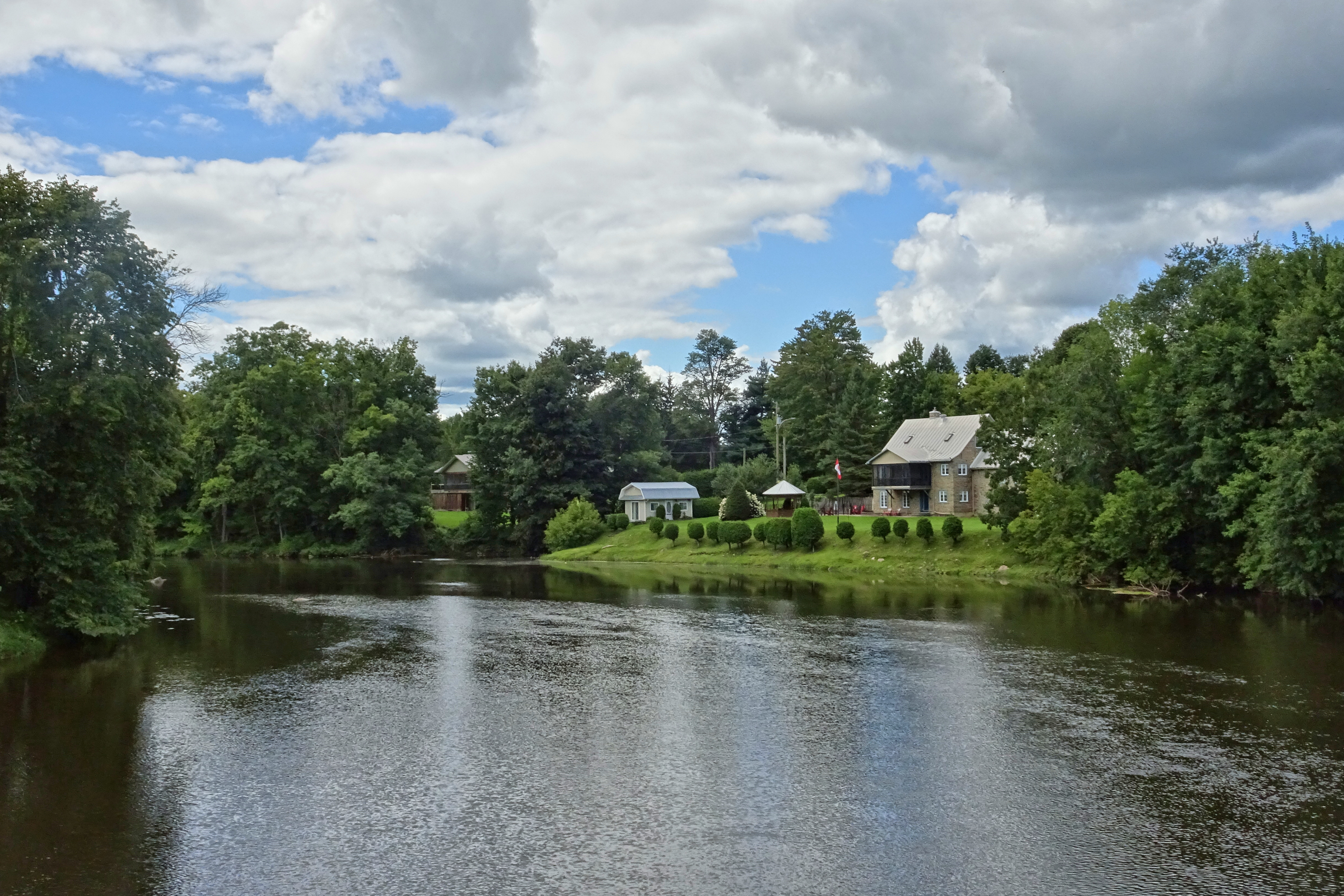
Dewittville

The following locations reside within the municipality's boundaries:

- Dewittville (45°06′52″N 74°05′48″W) – a hamlet situated along Route 138 and the Châteauguay River, midway between Huntingdon and Ormstown.
- Lee's Corner (45°03′19″N 74°20′08″W) – a hamlet situated 15 kilometers (9.3 mi) west of Huntingdon.

=== Lakes & Rivers ===
The following waterways pass through or are situated within the municipality's boundaries:

- Châteauguay River – runs along the municipality's northeast border.
- Trout River – runs along the municipality's southeastern border.

Several other smaller streams and waterways also exist throughout the municipality.

== Demographics ==
In the 2021 Census of Population conducted by Statistics Canada, Godmanchester had a population of 1,403 living in 582 of its 621 total private dwellings, a change of 0.6% from its 2016 population of 1,394. With a land area of 138.66 km^{2} (53.54 sq mi), it had a population density of 10.1/km^{2} (26.2/sq mi) in 2021.

Canada census – Godmanchester community profile

	2021	2016	2011
Population	1,403 (+0.6% from 2016)	1,394 (-1.6% from 2011)	1,417 (-2.7% from 2006)
Land area	138.66 km^{2} (53.54 sq mi)	138.80 km^{2} (53.59 sq mi)	138.78 km^{2} (53.58 sq mi)
Population density	10.1/km^{2} (26/sq mi)	10.0/km^{2} (26/sq mi)	10.2/km^{2} (26/sq mi)
Median age	47.2 (M: 49.2, F: 46.4)	48.4 (M: 49.0, F: 47.9)	45.6 (M: 45.8, F: 45.0)
Private dwellings	621 (total) 582 (occupied)	618 (total) 571 (occupied)	604 (total)
Median household income	$65,000	$54,400	$47,249

References: 2021 2016 2011

Historical Census Data - Godmanchester, Quebec

Year	Pop.	±%
1861	2,212	—
1871	2,055	−7.1%
1881	1,893	−7.9%
1891	1,673	−11.6%
1901	1,735	+3.7%
1911	1,623	−6.5%
1921	1,603	−1.2%
1931	1,439	−10.2%

Year	Pop.	±%
1941	1,374	−4.5%
1951	1,398	+1.7%
1956	1,473	+5.4%
1961	1,588	+7.8%
1966	1,833	+15.4%
1971	1,887	+2.9%
1976	1,735	−8.1%
1981	1,702	−1.9%

Year	Pop.	±%
1986	1,620	−4.8%
1991	1,557	−3.9%
1996	1,550	−0.4%
2001	1,528	−1.4%
2006	1,457	−4.6%
2011	1,417	−2.7%
2016	1,394	−1.6%
2021	1,403	+0.6%

Source: Statistics Canada

Canada Census Mother Tongue - Godmanchester, Quebec
Census	Total	French			English			French & English			Other		
Year	Responses	Count	Trend	Pop %	Count	Trend	Pop %	Count	Trend	Pop %	Count	Trend	Pop %
2021	1,405	760	▼3.2%	54.1%	540	0.0%	38.4%	50	▲66.6%	3.6%	50	▲42.9%	3.6%
2016	1,390	785	▼1.3%	56.5%	540	▼0.9%	38.8%	30	▲20.0%	2.2%	35	▼30.0%	2.5%
2011	1,415	795	▼15.4%	56.2%	545	▲13.5%	38.5%	25	▲150.0%	1.8%	50	▲42.9%	3.5%
2006	1,465	940	▲34.3%	64.2%	480	▼49.0%	32.8%	10	▼80.0%	0.7%	35	▼46.2%	2.4%
2001	1,570	700	▼10.0%	44.6%	715	▲0.7%	45.5%	90	▲157.1%	5.7%	65	▲116.7%	4.1%
1996	1,545	770	n/a	49.8%	710	n/a	46.0%	35	n/a	2.3%	30	n/a	1.9%

== Economy ==
Godmanchester is a rural municipality primarily characterized by its agricultural economy. The local economy relies heavily on farming, with a focus on dairy, cattle, and crop production, such as grains and corn. Given its proximity to the United States, agriculture and trade benefit from access to both domestic and cross-border markets. Although small in size, the region supports local businesses connected to the agricultural sector, including machinery and equipment services. The quiet, rural nature of Godmanchester shapes its economy, which remains largely based on traditional farming activities.

== Government ==
List of former mayors:

- James Biggar (1845–1847)
- Alexander Anderson (1855)
- Charles Dewitt (1855–1857)
- James O'Neill (1857–1860)
- Robert Douglas (1860–1862, 1866–1873)
- Peter Brady (1862–1866)
- John Stewart (1873–1875)
- David White (1875–1878)
- John Ferns (1878–1883)
- William H. Walker (1883–1899)
- Alexander Cunningham (1899–1903)
- Charles Bell (1903–1905)
- Malcolm Mc Naughton (1905–1909)
- Andrew O'Connor (1909–1911)
- William J. Smellie (1911–1912)
- Joseph T. Smythe (1912–1913)
- William D. Ruddock (1913–1916, 1917–1919)
- Arthur Rankin (1916–1917)
- Edward P. Tallon (1919–1921)
- John Purcell (1921–1925)
- John White (1925–1927)
- William J. Sherry (1927–1937)
- Alfred Latulipe (1937–1941)
- John Tannahill (1941–1946)
- William Graham (1946–1947)
- John Caldwell (1947–1953)
- Olivier Leblanc (1953–1957)
- Patrick Sherry (1957–1959)
- Hector St-Onge (1959–1965)
- Charles Reid (1965–1973)
- Réal Racine (1973–1979)
- Marion Trépanier (1979–1983)
- Philippe Leblanc (1984–1999)
- Pierre Poirier (1999–present)

== Infrastructure ==
The CIT du Haut-Saint-Laurent provides commuter and local bus services.

== See also ==
- List of anglophone communities in Quebec
- List of township municipalities in Quebec
