= Chateauguay Valley Regional High School =

Location
- 1597 Rte 138A; Ormstown, Quebec, J0S 1K0; Canada; 45°7′28″N 74°0′50″W

Information
- School type: High school
- Motto: Ad Intellegendum
- Founded: 1967
- School board: New Frontiers School Board
- Grades: 7 to 11
- Enrollment: Approx. 550 (2019)
- Language: English and French
- Area: Chateauguay Valley and Salaberry-de-Valleyfield
- Colours: Navy, light blue and white
- Mascot: Spartan
- Team name: The Spartans

Chateauguay Valley Regional (CVR)is a bilingual English/French high school in Ormstown, Quebec, Canada, serving the Chateauguay Valley and Valleyfield area. It is administered by the New Frontiers School Board. Enrollment was approximately 550 as of 2019, but has ranged from 550 to 1500 during the school's history, in accordance with demographic trends.

CVR was opened in 1967. It was the first regional school in Quebec, built to consolidate the smaller high schools in the area into one central school, teaching grades 7 through 11. The school has a strong name in athletics, and their mascot is the Spartan.

== Athletics ==
Athletics have always been a special aspect of CVR student life since the school's opening in 1967. CVR has fielded many competitive and championship teams, including several provincial champions. Championship titles include women's basketball (5), women's hockey (5), track & field (1), cross country (1) and football (1).

CVR currently fields 46 athletic teams (24 female and 22 male) that compete in various disciplines in the RESQ Montérégie region, the SSIAA (South Shore Interscholastic Athletic Association) and the GMAA (Greater Montreal Athletic Association). CVR has also been a member of, and competed in the ETIAC (Eastern Townships Interscholastic Athletic Association) School wide house and intramural sports programs have a strong tradition at CVR.

Many former CVR students have gone on to participate in post-secondary athletics at Canadian and American colleges and universities, professional sport clubs, Canadian national teams, and Olympic games. Doug Vandor was a 2008 and 2012 Summer Olympian, and Matt Heaton was the 2017 and 2019 Rugby Canada Men's 15's Player of the Year.

== Performing arts ==
The CVR Performing Arts department was started in 2005. It is headed by music teacher Lynn Harper, drama teacher Dawna Babin and dance teacher Cindel Chartrand. Starting with the 2005 production of the musical FAME, the department has gone on to produce shows including Grease, Footloose, OZ, Guys and Dolls, Annie, Anything Goes, Joseph and the Amazing Technicolor Dreamcoat, Dirty Dancing, Beauty and the Beast, Charlie and The Chocolate Factory, Alice in Wonderland, Neverland, frozen and The Lion King. Some students in these productions have gone on to pursue higher education in the performing arts, including theatre programs at Dawson College, John Abbott College, Vanier College and the National Theatre School of Canada.

== See also ==
- New Frontiers School Board
- Wikimapia entry for CVR
- Pictures around the school
- Picture of the front of the school
