= Rivière aux Outardes Est =

Location
- Country: United States, Canada
- State - Province: New York State, Quebec
- Region: Clinton County, New York (New York State), Montérégie (Quebec)
- Region: Clinton County, New York, Le Haut-Saint-Laurent Regional County Municipality

Physical characteristics
- Source
  - location: Clinton County, New York, New York State, United States
- Mouth
  - location: Ormstown, Le Haut-Saint-Laurent Regional County Municipality, Montérégie, Quebec, Canada
  - elevation: 40 metres (130 ft)
- Length: 28.7 km (17.8 mi)

Basin features
- Progression: Rivière aux Outardes - Chateauguay River - Saint Lawrence River
- River system: Saint Lawrence River
- Tributaries
  - left: (upstream) Discharge of a set of lakes, Mitchel stream, discharge of five lakes, unidentified stream, unidentified transboundary stream, stream.
  - right: (upstream) Unidentified stream, discharge from a small lake, discharge from a small lake, stream, stream.

The Rivière aux Outardes Est (French pronunciation: [ʁivjɛʁ oz‿utaʁd ɛst]) is a tributary of the rivière aux Outardes. This cross-border river between Canada and the United States crosses:

- Clinton County, in New York State, in United States;
- the municipalities of Franklin, Ormstown and Hinchinbrooke, in the Le Haut-Saint-Laurent Regional County Municipality, in Montérégie, in Quebec, in Canada.

In Canada, the East Outardes River valley is mainly served by (from the mouth): the Rivière-aux-Outardes road, the Montée de Rockburn, the Gore road, the Williams road rang des Botreaux, chemin du rang Dumas, Montée Sharpe, chemin du 8e rang, chemin Wilson, route 202, route 209 and chemin from Covey Hill.

The river surface is generally frozen from mid-December to the end of March. Safe circulation on the ice is generally done from the end of December to the beginning of March. The water level of the river varies with the seasons and the precipitation.

== Geography ==
The East Bustard River begins at a small forest lake in Clinton County, in New York State, just south of the border. This source is located 0.2 kilometres (0.12 mi) south of the Canada-United States border.

From this small head lake, the course of the East Outardes River flows over 28.7 kilometres (17.8 mi) with a drop of 270 metres (890 ft), according to the following segments:

- 0.2 kilometres (0.12 mi) north-west in the county of Clinton (NY), up to the Canada-US border.
- 2.1 kilometres (1.3 mi) northwesterly in the municipality of Franklin (in Quebec) relatively in a straight line, to a bend located on the south side of Covey Hill road;
- 5.4 kilometres (3.4 mi) westward crossing the Covey Hill road, collecting a stream (coming from the east) and sometimes forming small coils, up to route 209 either in the hamlet Bridgetown;
- 5.4 kilometres (3.4 mi) first towards the northwest, then towards the north by crossing route 202 and chemin Wilson, forming a large curve towards east, intersecting Chemin Welsh, forming two loops southwest along Montée Sharpe, to a bend located near the intersection of chemin du rang Dumas and Montée Sharpe;
- 5.8 kilometres (3.6 mi) towards the west by collecting two discharges (coming from the north; each draining a small lake), by crossing the chemin du rang Dumas, by bending towards the north where its course forms some large streamers, by cutting the road from rang des Botreaux, to a bend in the river;
- 2.2 kilometres (1.4 mi) to the southwest by collecting the discharge (coming from the east) from five small lakes and by collecting a stream (coming from the northwest), up to a bend in the river corresponding to the outlet of Mitchel Creek (coming from the southeast) which rises in New York State;
- 7.6 kilometres (4.7 mi) to the southwest by crossing Chemin Gore and more or less following the climb of Rockburn (located to the southwest), forming several loops, crossing Chemin de la Rivière -aux-Outardes at the end of the segment, until its mouth.

The Rivière aux Outardes Est generally flows into an agricultural zone, crossing forest islets, to flow onto the south bank of the Rivière aus Outardes. This confluence is located at:

- 2.8 kilometres (1.7 mi) south-east of the village center of Dewittville;
- 5.5 kilometres (3.4 mi) south-west of the confluence of the rivière aux Outardes and the Chateauguay River;
- 6.2 kilometres (3.9 mi) south-west of the village center of Ormstown.

From the mouth of the East Outardes river, the current follows the course of the Outardes river on 6.4 kilometres (4.0 mi); then the course of the Châteauguay river on 41.0 kilometres (25.5 mi) to the south shore of lake Saint-Louis (Saint-Laurent river).

== Toponymy ==
The toponym "Rivière aux Outardes Est" was formalized on December 5, 1968 at the Commission de toponymie du Québec.

== See also ==
- List of rivers of New York State
- List of rivers of Quebec
