= Elgin, Quebec =

Elgin
- Municipality
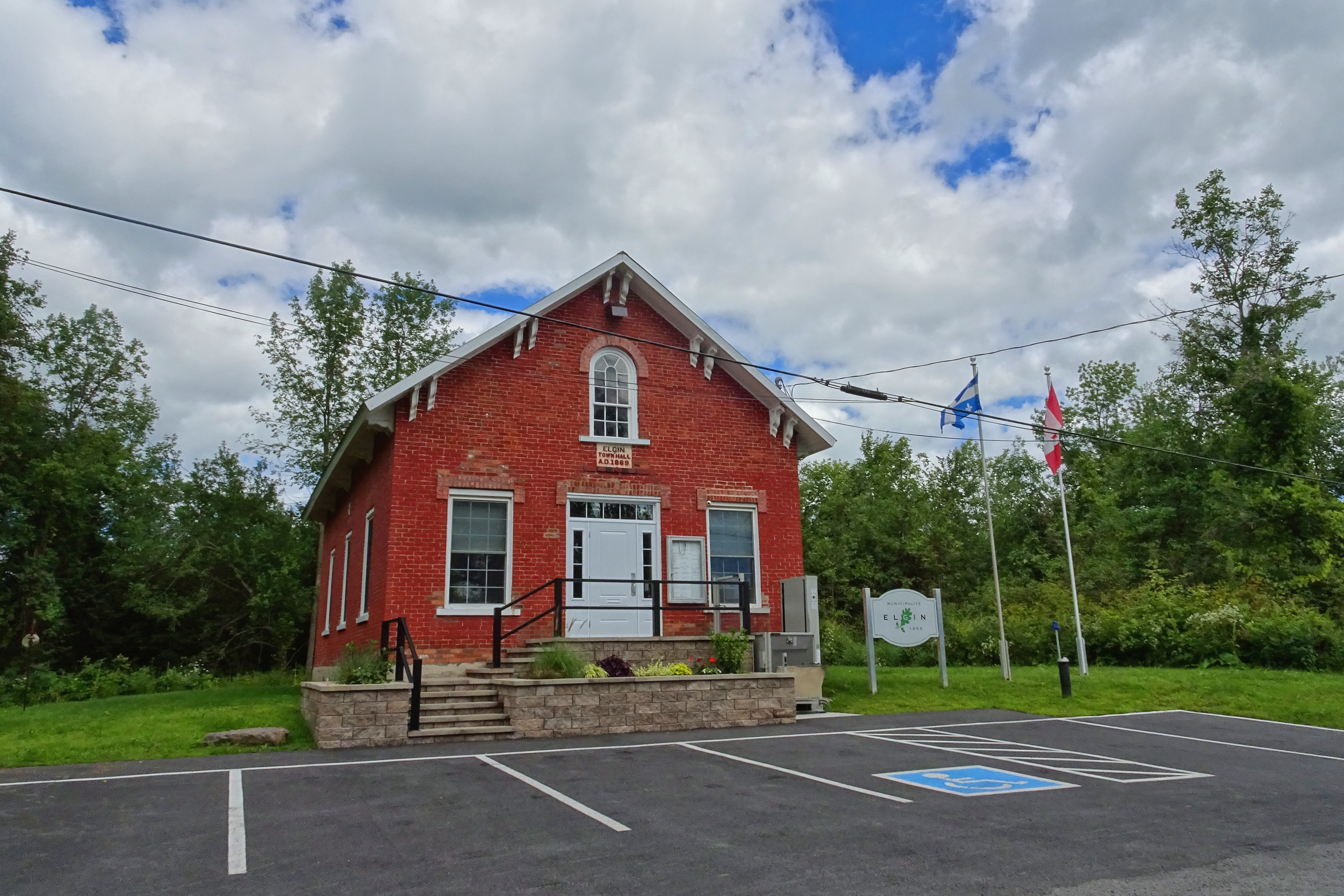
- Elgin town hall

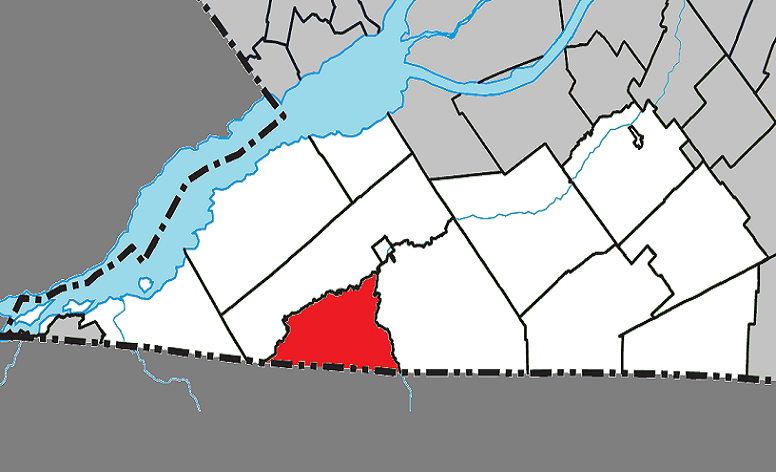
- Location within Le Haut-Saint-Laurent RCM

- Location in southern Quebec
- Coordinates: 45.0222°N 74.2292°W
- Country: Canada
- Province: Quebec
- Region: Montérégie
- RCM: Le Haut-Saint-Laurent
- Constituted: July 1, 1855

Government
  - Mayor: Deborah Stewart
  - Federal riding: Salaberry—Suroît
  - Prov. riding: Huntingdon

Area
  - Total: 69.51 km^{2} (26.84 sq mi)
  - Land: 69.35 km^{2} (26.78 sq mi)

Population (2021)
  - Total: 389
  - Density: 5.6/km^{2} (15/sq mi)
  - Pop (2016-21): ▼1.3%
  - Dwellings: 206
- Time zone: UTC−5 (EST)
  - Summer (DST): UTC−4 (EDT)
- Postal code(s): J0S 2E0
- Area codes: 450 and 579
- Highways: R-138

Elgin is a rural municipality in Quebec, Canada. The population as of the 2021 Canadian census was 389. It is located southwest of Huntingdon and bounded by the Trout and Châteauguay rivers and the Canada–United States border.

== History ==
The Municipality of the Township of Elgin was formed in 1855, with the present town hall being built in 1869. Its small fields and many stone houses attest to the first Scottish settlers who began arriving in the early 19th century. It was named in honour of James Bruce, 8th Earl of Elgin, who had become popular with French Canadians for passing the Rebellion Losses Bill in 1849 to compensate the victims of the 1837 Uprising.

In 2009, the township municipality changed statutes to become a regular municipality.

== Geography ==
The municipality is situated on the border with the United States, 14 kilometres south-west of Huntingdon, Quebec. It is one of the two southernmost communities in Quebec, along with Hinchinbrooke, with their tripoint with New York on the Châteauguay River being the southernmost point in the province.

=== Communities ===
The following locations reside within the municipality's boundaries:

- Trout River (44°59′52″N 74°19′00″W) – a hamlet situated on Route 138, just north of the U.S. border. Includes Canada & US Customs border crossing.

=== Lakes & rivers ===
The following waterways pass through or are situated within the municipality's boundaries:

- Trout River (45°04′24″N 74°11′07″W) – runs along the municipality's Western and Northern border.
- Châteauguay River (45°01′56″N 74°11′08.9″W) – delineates the municipality's Eastern border.

== Demographics ==
=== Population ===
Canada census – Elgin community profile

	2021	2016	2011
Population	389 (-1.3% from 2016)	394 (-1.7% from 2011)	401 (-12.4% from 2006)
Land area	69.35 km^{2} (26.78 sq mi)	69.61 km^{2} (26.88 sq mi)	69.62 km^{2} (26.88 sq mi)
Population density	5.6/km^{2} (15/sq mi)	5.7/km^{2} (15/sq mi)	5.8/km^{2} (15/sq mi)
Median age	54.0 (M: 52.8, F: 56.0)	52.4 (M: 52.1, F: 52.6)	50.8 (M: 50.8, F: 51.0)
Private dwellings	206 (total) 175 (occupied)	221 (total) 176 (occupied)	196 (total)
Median household income	$57,200	$46,848	$.N/A

Notes: 2011 income data for this area has been suppressed for data quality or confidentiality reasons.
References: 2021 2016 2011

Historical Census Data - Elgin, Quebec

Year	Pop.	±%
1921	693	—
1931	662	−4.5%
1941	637	−3.8%
1951	539	−15.4%
1956	497	−7.8%
1961	495	−0.4%

Year	Pop.	±%
1966	427	−13.7%
1971	454	+6.3%
1976	524	+15.4%
1981	455	−13.2%
1986	436	−4.2%
1991	469	+7.6%

Year	Pop.	±%
1996	448	−4.5%
2001	449	+0.2%
2006	458	+2.0%
2011	401	−12.4%
2016	394	−1.7%
2021	389	−1.3%

Source: Statistics Canada

=== Language ===
Canada Census Mother Tongue - Elgin, Quebec
Census	Total	French			English			French & English			Other		
Year	Responses	Count	Trend	Pop %	Count	Trend	Pop %	Count	Trend	Pop %	Count	Trend	Pop %
2011	405	155	▼8.8%	38.27%	210	▼22.2%	51.85%	10	▲ n/a%	2.47%	30	▲200.0%	7.41%
2006	450	170	▲3.0%	37.8%	270	▲14.9%	60.00%	0	▼100.0%	0.00%	10	▼77.8%	2.22%
2001	455	165	▲43.5%	36.26%	235	▼17.5%	51.65%	10	▲ n/a%	2.20%	45	0.0%	9.89%
1996	445	115	n/a	25.84%	285	n/a	64.05%	0	n/a	0.00%	45	n/a	10.11%

== Local government ==
List of former mayors:

- Noëlla Daoust (...–2005)
- Jean-Pierre Proulx (2005–2009)
- Deborah Stewart (2009–present)

== Arts and culture ==
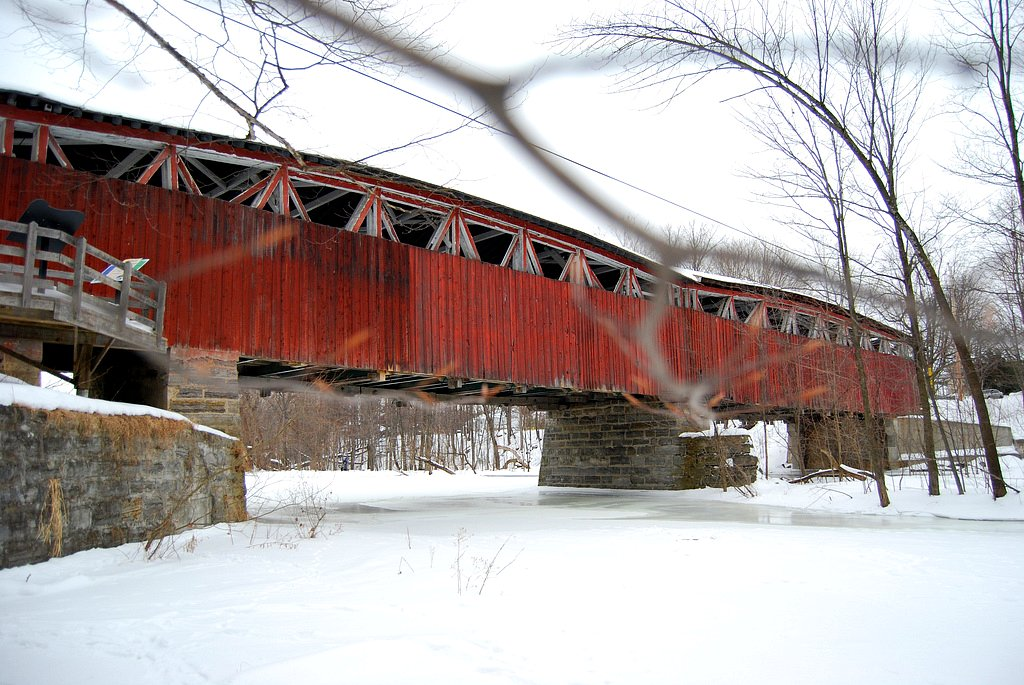
Powerscourt Covered Bridge over the Châteauguay River

A rural art and music centre offers a full summer program of professional entertainment and cultural events in a renovated old church, now named Kelso Hall. Run by community volunteers Kim Moss, Nora Quinn, and Cathleen Johnston, Kelso Hall has been host to comedian Lorne Elliott, classical string quartets, silent movies with piano accompaniment, slide-music presentations, exhibits of art, and more. (Since 2013, this project has been closed)

== See also ==
- Jamieson Line Border Crossing
- List of anglophone communities in Quebec
- List of municipalities in Quebec
