= Howard S. Billings Regional High School =

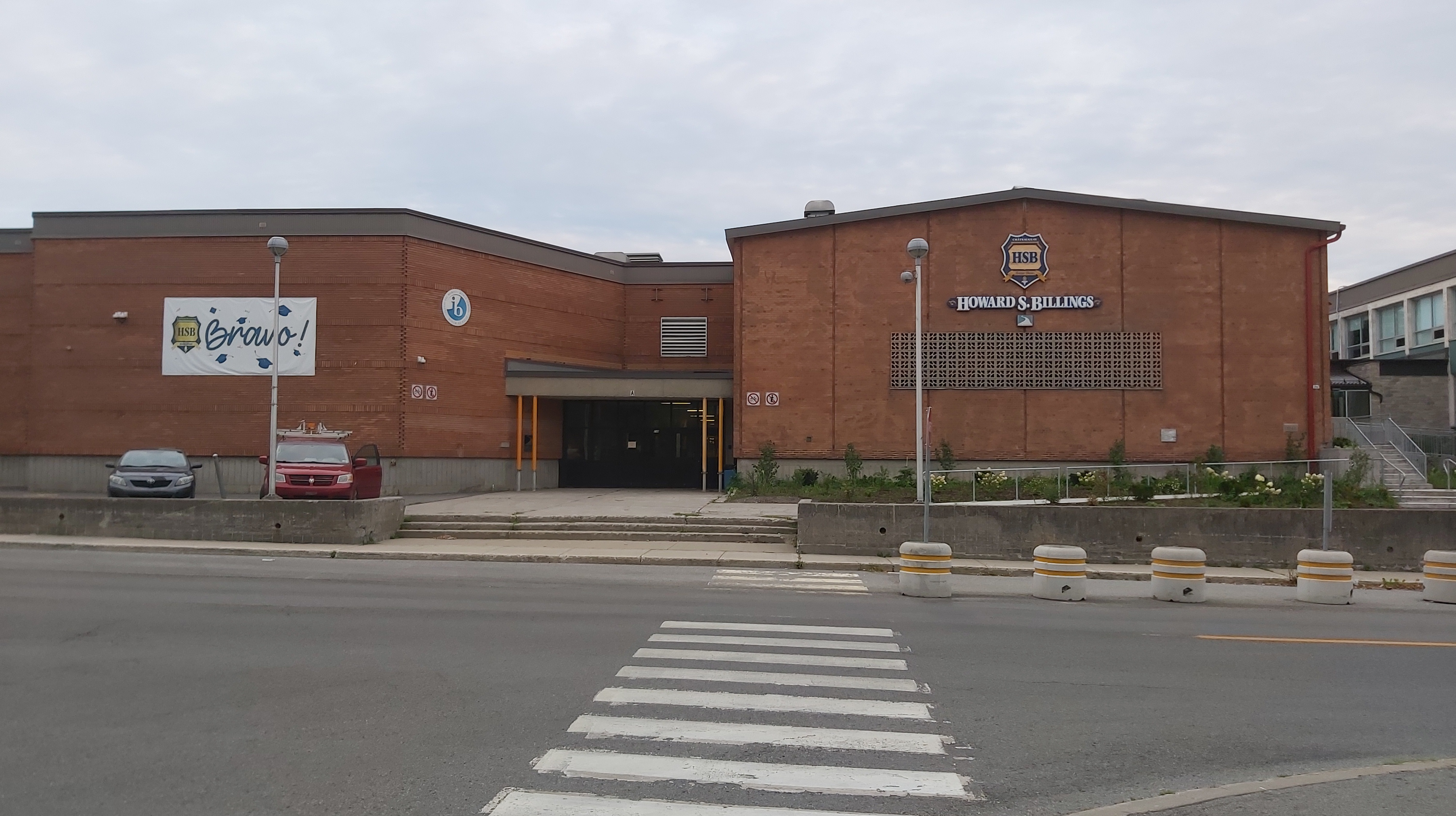
- The front entrance of the school with banner congratulating new graduates.

Location
- 210 Mcleod; Châteauguay, Quebec, J6J 2H4; Canada; 45.3639°N 73.7307°W

Information
- Type: High school
- Motto: Carpe Diem (Seize the Day)
- Founded: 1967
- School board: New Frontiers School Board
- Grades: 7 to 11
- Enrollment: approx. 850 (2019)
- Language: English
- Area: Châteauguay, Kahnawake, Léry, Mercier
- Colours: Blue and yellow
- Team name: The Blazers
- Newspaper: The Vision (Defunct)

Howard S. Billings Regional High School is an English-language public secondary school located in Châteauguay, Quebec, Canada. It was established in 1967 and is part of the New Frontiers School Board.

The school is named after Dr. Howard S. Billings, a Quebec educator who retired as associate deputy minister of education in 1967.

The school is divided into four wings, corresponding to the cardinal points. The east wing houses New Frontiers School Board offices and the classrooms used for students enrolled in the International Baccalaureate Programme.

Campus facilities:

- Library
- Computer labs
- Basketball and tennis courts
- Track & field area
- Three gymnasiums
- Weight-training room
- Cafeteria
- Auditorium
- Sound recording studio
- Art room
- Science labs
