= Rivière aux Outardes (Chateauguay River tributary) =

Location
- Country: United States, Canada
- State - Province: New York State, Quebec
- Region: Clinton County, New York (New York State), Montérégie (Quebec)
- Region: Clinton County, New York, Le Haut-Saint-Laurent Regional County Municipality

Physical characteristics
- Source
  - location: Clinton County, New York, New York State, United States
  - elevation: 48 metres (157 ft)
- Mouth
  - location: Ormstown, Le Haut-Saint-Laurent Regional County Municipality, Montérégie, Quebec, Canada
  - elevation: 40 metres (130 ft)
- Length: 18.2 km (11.3 mi)

Basin features
- Progression: Chateauguay River - Saint Lawrence River
- River system: Saint Lawrence River
- Tributaries
  - right: (upstream) Finalyason Creek, rivière aux Outardes Est, School Creek, Flynn outlet.

The Rivière aux Outardes (French pronunciation: [ʁivjɛʁ oz‿utaʁd], Bustard River) is a tributary of the Chateauguay River. It crosses the municipalities of Hinchinbrooke and Ormstown, in the Le Haut-Saint-Laurent Regional County Municipality, in the administrative region of Montérégie, in the province of Quebec, in Canada.

The surface of the rivière aux Outardes (except the rapids areas) is generally frozen from the beginning of December to the end of March; however, safe circulation on the ice is generally done from the end of December to the beginning of March. The water level of the river varies with the seasons and the precipitation; the spring flood occurs in March or April.

== Geography ==
The main neighboring hydrographic slopes are:

- north side: Chateauguay River;
- east side: Chateauguay River, Smith Creek;
- south side: Rivière aux Outardes Est;
- west side: Cluff Creek, Trout River.

The course of the "Rivière aux Outardes" begins at the confluence of several agricultural streams north of the hamlet Athelstan, east of the Trout River, southeast of the village of Huntingdon, north of the border between Canada and the United States, and south of the route 202.

The Rivière aux Outardes flows for 11.8 km (7.3 mi) to the mouth of the Rivière aux Outardes Est, in Hinchinbrooke; then 6.4 km to its mouth.

The Outardes River flows northeast in agricultural areas, more or less in parallel (south side) of Châteauguay River, and gradually approaching it. The confluence of these two rivers is located 270 metres (890 ft) upstream from the route 138 bridge spanning the Châteauguay River and 0.8 km (0.50 mi) upstream from the village bridge of Ormstown spanning the Chateauguay River.

The "Chemin de la rivière aux Outardes" runs along the Rivière aux Outardes (on the south side), between Montée Rockburn and the mouth. The river segment between the "Rivière aux Outardes Est" and the mouth, has six rapids zones.

== Toponymy ==
The toponym "Rivière aux Outardes" was formalized on December 5, 1968, at the Commission de toponymie du Québec.

== See also ==
- List of rivers of Quebec
