= Trout River (Chateauguay River tributary) =

Coordinates: 45°05′24″N 74°11′07″W

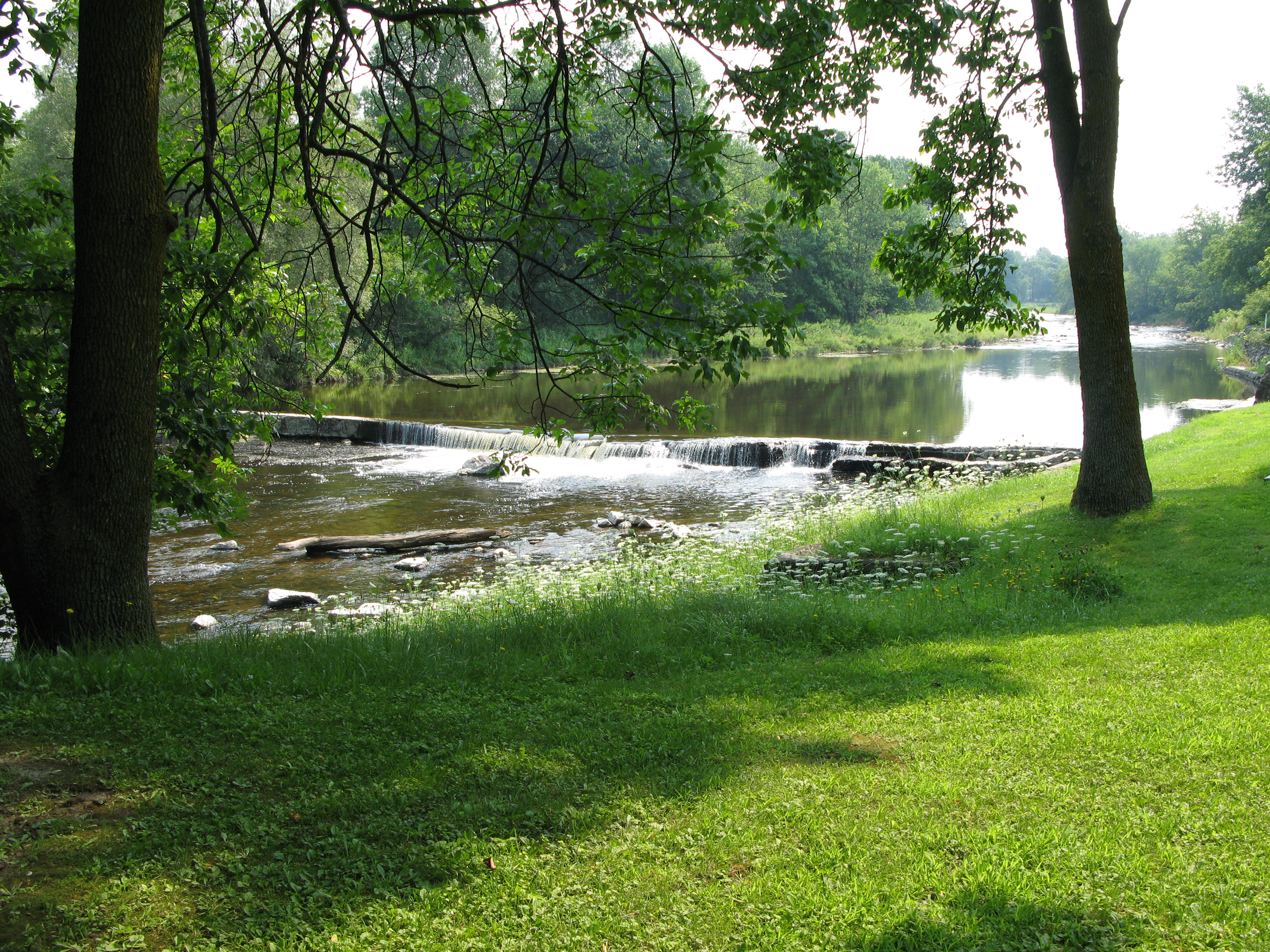
- Trout River at the St-Onge Dam
- Native name: Rivière Trout (French)

Location
- Country: United States, Canada
- State - Province: New York State, Quebec
- Region: Adirondack Park (New York State), Montérégie (Quebec)
- Region: Franklin County, New York, Le Haut-Saint-Laurent Regional County Municipality

Physical characteristics
- Source
  - location: Adirondack Park
- Mouth
  - location: Elgin, Godmanchester, Montérégie (Québec, Canada)
  - elevation: 45 metres (148 ft)
- Length: 57.6 km (35.8 mi)
- Basin size: 427.35 km^{2} (165.00 sq mi)

Basin features
- Progression: Châteauguay River - Saint Lawrence River
- River system: Saint Lawrence River
- Tributaries
  - left: (upstream) Pringle Creek (Canada), Weaver Stream (Canada), Beaver Creek (Canada), O'Reilly Creek (Canada), unidentified creek (USA).
  - right: (upstream) Murray Brook (Canada), Little Trout River (New York) (USA), Collins Brook (USA).

Trout River (French: Rivière Trout) is a tributary of Châteauguay River, flowing in:

- the Adirondack Park, in Franklin County, New York, in Northern of New York State, in United States;
- the municipalities of Godmanchester and Elgin, in the Le Haut-Saint-Laurent Regional County Municipality, in the administrative region of Montérégie, in southwestern Quebec, Canada.

This valley is mainly served in Quebec by the route 138 which passes on the west side of the river (from the border), then on the northwest side going towards the mouth. In New York State, the nearby route is Constable Street and State Highway 30.

The river surface is generally frozen from mid-December to the end of March. Safe circulation on the ice is generally done from the end of December to the beginning of March. The water level of the river varies with the seasons and the precipitation.

== Geography ==
This river originates in various rivers including the Little Trout River in the Adirondack Mountains located in upstate New York, United States.

Trout River, also called Rivière à la Truite in French, is a non-navigable and non-buoyant river: it has only 427.35 square kilometres (165.00 mi^{2}) of drainage basin that flows between the townships of Elgin and Godmanchester in front of lots granted by the Crown prior to June 1, 1884.

This private basin is owned by local residents (private watercourses: article 919. second paragraph, of the Civil Code of Quebec). The property extends to the river bed to the center (or better up to the water): which gives the right to fish and use the bottom in front of the properties (use: article 981. of Civil Code of Quebec). But private rights to the river must also respect those of others: because it is a kind of common property. There would be a legal right of way on private waterways so that people cannot be prevented from crossing the water. It is a municipal watercourse (not navigable), it is under the control of the Quebec Municipal Code and the municipality which can make regulations.

Trout River has two dams: the St-Onge Dam located in the hamlet of Trout River in Elgin near the Canada–US border. The other dam is the Hooker Dam, which is located between the hamlet of Kensington in Godmanchester and the path of the second concession to Elgin. The Trout River flows into the Châteauguay River just south of the town of Huntingdon. The municipality of Huntingdon set up a Route 138 rest stop at the confluence of the two rivers.

From its source in Adirondack Park, the Trout River descends on 57.6 kilometres (35.8 mi), with a drop of , according to the following segments:

Trout river course on the American side (segment of 34.5 kilometres (21.4 mi) with a drop of )

- 4.8 kilometres (3.0 mi) north to Moody Road, then northwest to the north limit of Adirondack Park;
- 7.2 kilometres (4.5 mi) towards the north-west, forming a large curve towards the north-east, crossing the Brainardsville Road and the Donohue Road, then turns west by cutting the Burke City Road, until at highway 11;
- 8.6 kilometres (5.3 mi) north-west until close to Constable Street, where the course of the river goes north by crossing the Town Line Road, then branches west towards the end of the segment, to Constable Street Bridge;
- 6.1 kilometres (3.8 mi) northwest, first crossing County Highway 22, forming a few loops, then bending northeast to intersect State Highway 30, to the release of the Little Trout River (New York) (coming from the southeast);
- 7.8 kilometres (4.8 mi) northerly, forming a large S and passing on the west side of Trout River State Forest, as well as more or less along State Highway 30 and crossing Stebbin Road and curving west at the end of the segment, up to the Canada-US border;

Trout river course on the Canadian side (segment of 23.1 kilometres (14.4 mi) with a drop of 22 metres (72 ft))

- 7.3 kilometres (4.5 mi) towards the north by forming a big S in agricultural area and by forming a loop towards the east at the end of the segment and another towards the west, to the bottom of a loop, opposite a small hamlet (near the meeting point of route 138 and Montée Leblanc;
- 4.2 kilometres (2.6 mi) towards the northeast, relatively in a straight line by forming a hook towards the north at the end of the segment, to the bottom of a loop which receives the Beaver stream (coming from the northeast Where is);
- 11.6 kilometres (7.2 mi) towards the northeast by winding in two zones, passing on the north side of the hamlet Kelvingrove, by collecting the Pringle stream (coming from the west), until its confluence.

The Trout River flows on the west bank of the Châteauguay River, 1.6 kilometres (0.99 mi) south of the village center of Hemmingford. From there, the current descends the course of the Château river for 60.3 kilometres (37.5 mi) to the south shore of lac Saint-Louis, at Châteauguay, south-west of Montreal.

== Toponymy ==
In Franklin County (NY, USA), this river is designated "Trout River", just like in Canada.

The Commission de toponymie du Québec formalized the name on September 22, 1976.

== See also ==
- Châteauguay River
- Elgin, Quebec
- Franklin County, New York
- Godmanchester, Quebec
- Huntingdon, Quebec
- Le Haut-Saint-Laurent Regional County Municipality
- Little Trout River
- List of rivers of New York State
- List of rivers of Quebec

== Sources ==
- Government of Quebec Quebec Ministry of the Environment, the public water service.
