= Outarde =

Outarde may refer to:

== Places ==
- Pointe-aux-Outardes, Quebec, a municipality in Quebec on the north shore of the St Lawrence estuary, between the mouths of the Outardes and Manicouagan Rivers
- Chute-aux-Outardes, a village in at the mouth of the Outardes River

== Other uses ==
- Outarde (ship, 1939)
- Outarde somalienne, the French name of a bird otherwise known as the little brown bustard (Eupodotis humilis)

== See also ==
- Rivière aux Outardes (disambiguation)
