= Powerscourt Covered Bridge =

Covered bridge in southern Quebec, Canada

Powerscourt Covered Bridge Pont Percy
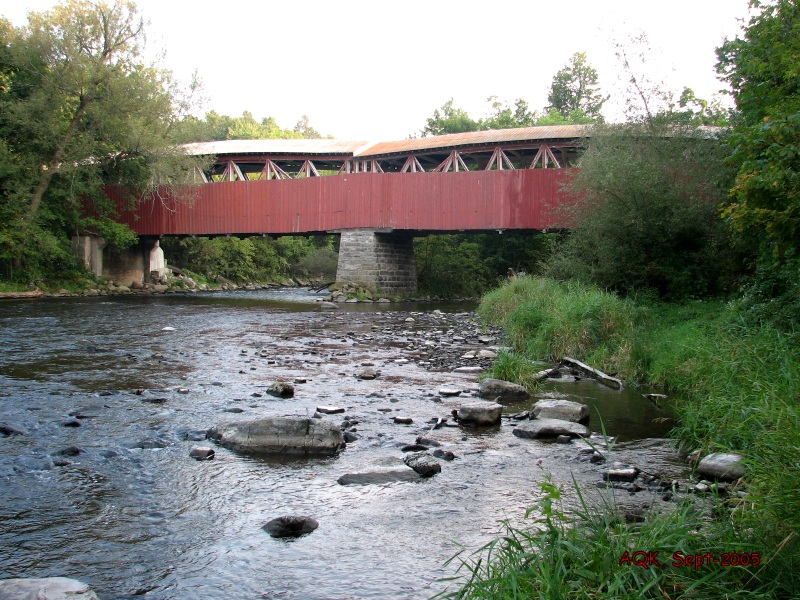
- View (August 2005) looking upriver, from the West bank (Elgin)
- Coordinates: 45.00871°N 74.15953°W
- Carries: 2-lane road (reduced to one lane + 2 sidewalks in 2010)
- Crosses: Châteauguay River
- Locale: Between Elgin and Hinchinbrooke

Characteristics
- Design: McCallum Truss
- Total length: 51 m (167 ft)
- Width: 6.2 m (20 ft)
- Height: 8 m (26 ft) to top
- Longest span: 26 m (85 ft)
- Clearance above: 3 m (9.8 ft)

History
- Opened: 1861

Statistics
- Daily traffic: Automotive and pedestrian

National Historic Site of Canada
- Official name: Powerscourt Covered Bridge National Historic Site of Canada
- Designated: 1984

Patrimoine culturel du Québec
- Type: Classified heritage immovable
- Designated: 1987

The Powerscourt Covered Bridge is a covered bridge that takes the First Concession Road across the Châteauguay River in Hinchinbrooke, Quebec. It is also known as the Percy Bridge.

It was constructed in 1861, and employs the McCallum inflexible arched truss, developed by Daniel McCallum. It was the only McCallum truss bridge that was not a railway bridge, and since wooden truss railway bridges have all but been replaced with steel and concrete bridges, it is the last bridge of its kind in the world. In 2009 it was fully restored to its original 1861 plans.

It is supported on three masonry piers and the two spans are structurally independent of each other.

The Powerscourt Covered Bridge was designated a National Historic Site of Canada in 1984 because:

- it is the only known example of a McCallum inflexible arched truss bridge still in existence;
- it is one of the oldest covered bridges that exists in Canada.

The bridge was also named an Historic Monument of Quebec in 1987. It was documented by the U.S. Historic American Engineering Record in 2003 with assistance from Public Works and Government Services Canada.

== See also ==
- List of bridges in Canada
- List of covered bridges in Quebec
