= Hinchinbrooke, Quebec =

Hinchinbrooke
- Municipality
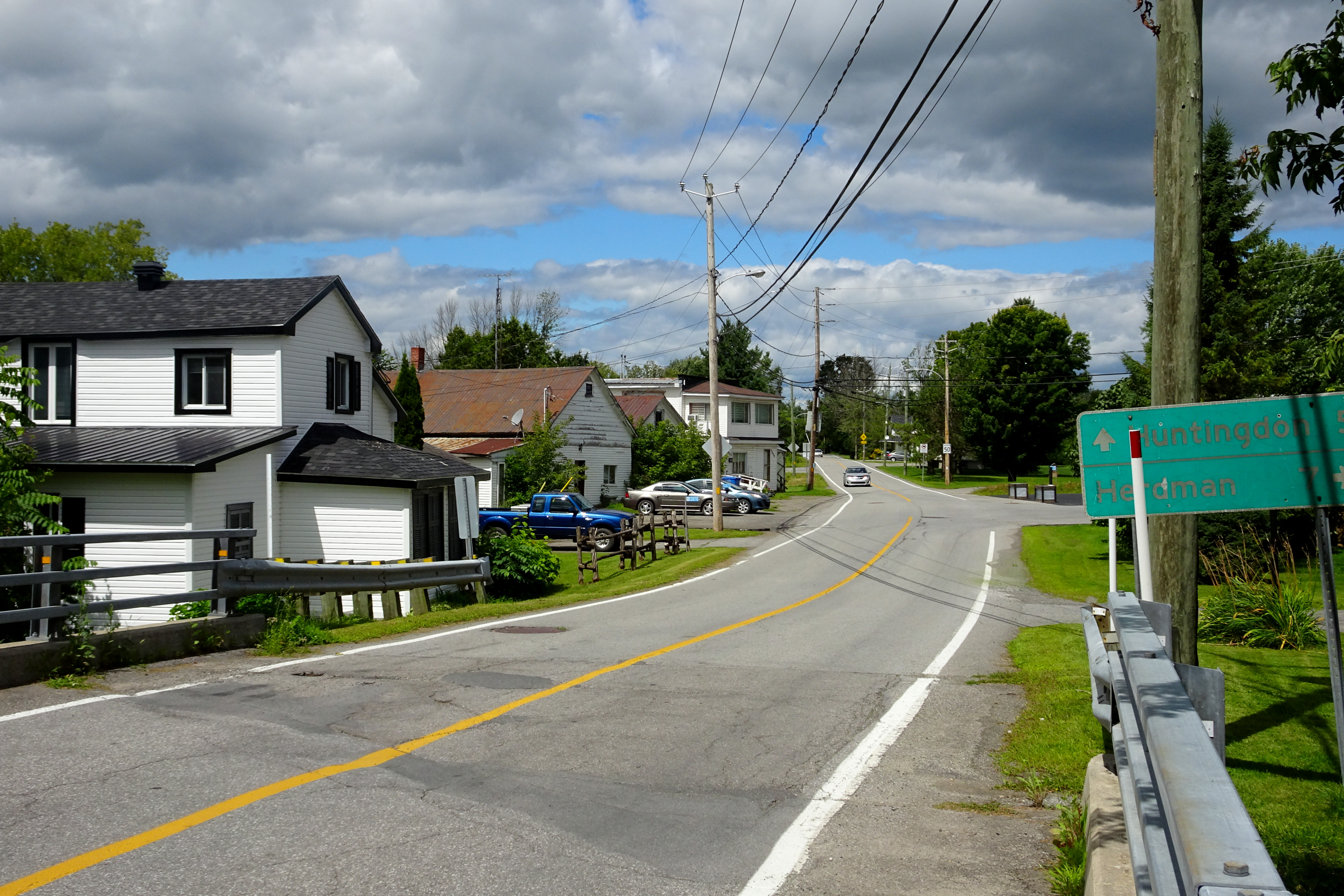
- Athelstan

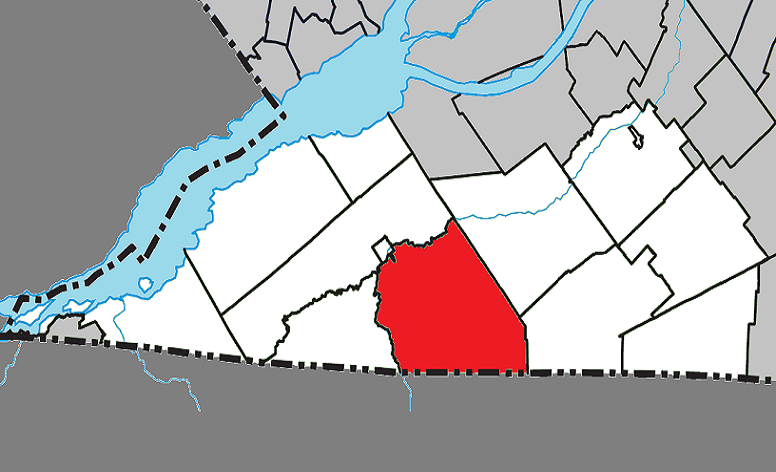
- Location within Le Haut-Saint-Laurent RCM

- Location in southern Quebec
- Coordinates: 45°03′N 74°06′W
- Country: Canada
- Province: Quebec
- Region: Montérégie
- RCM: Le Haut-Saint-Laurent
- Constituted: July 1, 1855

Government
  - Mayor: Mark Wallace
  - Federal riding: Salaberry—Suroît
  - Prov. riding: Huntingdon

Area
  - Total: 149.66 km^{2} (57.78 sq mi)
  - Land: 148.36 km^{2} (57.28 sq mi)

Population (2021)
  - Total: 2,187
  - Density: 14.7/km^{2} (38/sq mi)
  - Pop (2016-21): ▲4.0%
  - Dwellings: 1,177
- Time zone: UTC−5 (EST)
  - Summer (DST): UTC−4 (EDT)
- Postal code(s): J0S 1A0
- Area codes: 450 and 579
- Highways: R-202
- Website: mrchsl.com/municipalite/hinchinbrooke

Hinchinbrooke (or Hinchinbrook until 1993) is a rural community in southern Quebec, Canada, in the Châteauguay Valley, in the MRC de Le Haut-Saint-Laurent. The population as of the 2021 Canadian census was 2,187.

== History ==
Its first settlers were Irish who arrived around 1820. The parish was called Saint-Patrice-de-Hinchin(g)brook(e), or in English St. Patrick Hinchinbrook, named after an ancient country estate in Huntingdon, England (but without the "g" since it was not pronounced). In 1845, the Township Municipality of Hinchinbrooke was founded, but merged into the Municipality of Beauharnois Number Two on September 1, 1847 (along with Dundee, Hemmingford, Godmanchester, St. Anicet, Russeltown, and Ormstown). It was reestablished on July 1, 1855.

Since the 1980 dissolution of Huntingdon County, Hinchinbrooke is within Le Haut-Saint-Laurent Regional County Municipality.

Long written as Hinchinbrook, the spelling was officially corrected to Hinchinbrooke in 1993. On November 5, 2011, the township municipality changed statutes and became a regular municipality.

== Geography ==
The municipality is situated along the Canada–United States border. It is one of the two southernmost communities in Quebec, along with Elgin, with their tripoint with New York on the Châteauguay River being the southernmost point in the province.

=== Communities ===
The following locations reside within the municipality's boundaries:

- Athelstan (45°02′09″N 74°10′39″W) – a hamlet situated on the western border with Elgin.
- Brooklet (45°00′25″N 74°02′51″W) – a hamlet situated in the southeast.
- Herdman (45°01′34″N 74°05′43″W) – a hamlet located along Quebec Route 202 in the south.
- Parc Davignon (45°00′02″N 74°04′50″W) – a cottage community along the US border.
- Powerscourt (45°00′23″N 74°09′26″W) – a hamlet situated on the southwest border with Elgin.
- Rockburn (45°01′19″N 74°00′28″W) – a hamlet located along Quebec Route 202 in the southeast.

=== Lakes & Rivers ===
The following waterways pass through or are situated within the municipality's boundaries:

- Lac Moonlight (45°01′45″N 74°08′51″W) – a small lake in the southwest.
- Châteauguay River – runs along the municipality's western boundary.
- Rivière Hinchinbrooke (45°02′21″N 74°11′04″W)
- Rivière aux Outardes

=== Climate ===
Climate data for Hinchinbrooke
Month	Jan	Feb	Mar	Apr	May	Jun	Jul	Aug	Sep	Oct	Nov	Dec	Year
Record high °C (°F)	17.5 (63.5)	18.0 (64.4)	24.5 (76.1)	31.5 (88.7)	35.0 (95.0)	34.0 (93.2)	34.4 (93.9)	36.1 (97.0)	34.0 (93.2)	28.9 (84.0)	23.3 (73.9)	20.0 (68.0)	36.1 (97.0)
Mean daily maximum °C (°F)	−4.8 (23.4)	−2.9 (26.8)	2.5 (36.5)	11.5 (52.7)	18.9 (66.0)	23.8 (74.8)	26.1 (79.0)	25.0 (77.0)	20.7 (69.3)	13.3 (55.9)	6.1 (43.0)	−1.1 (30.0)	11.6 (52.9)
Mean daily minimum °C (°F)	−13.8 (7.2)	−12.3 (9.9)	−6.8 (19.8)	1.4 (34.5)	7.6 (45.7)	13.2 (55.8)	15.6 (60.1)	14.2 (57.6)	9.8 (49.6)	3.6 (38.5)	−1.5 (29.3)	−8.9 (16.0)	1.9 (35.4)
Record low °C (°F)	−36.7 (−34.1)	−37.2 (−35.0)	−29.5 (−21.1)	−14.0 (6.8)	−3.9 (25.0)	−0.5 (31.1)	4.0 (39.2)	1.7 (35.1)	−4.5 (23.9)	−7.8 (18.0)	−19.4 (−2.9)	−35.0 (−31.0)	−37.2 (−35.0)
Average precipitation mm (inches)	67.5 (2.66)	55.5 (2.19)	59.3 (2.33)	77.0 (3.03)	86.5 (3.41)	93.7 (3.69)	95.0 (3.74)	89.9 (3.54)	91.0 (3.58)	93.5 (3.68)	86.0 (3.39)	70.5 (2.78)	965.3 (38.00)
Source: Environment Canada based from Ormstown weather station

== Demographics ==
=== Population ===
Canada census – Hinchinbrooke community profile

	2021	2016	2011
Population	2,187 (+4.0% from 2016)	2,103 (-6.2% from 2011)	2,242 (-5.4% from 2006)
Land area	148.36 km^{2} (57.28 sq mi)	149.30 km^{2} (57.65 sq mi)	149.32 km^{2} (57.65 sq mi)
Population density	14.7/km^{2} (38/sq mi)	14.1/km^{2} (37/sq mi)	15.0/km^{2} (39/sq mi)
Median age	53.6 (M: 52.8, F: 54.4)	53.4 (M: 53.2, F: 53.8)	49.9 (M: 49.3, F: 50.5)
Private dwellings	1,177 (total) 1,026 (occupied)	1,186 (total) 969 (occupied)	1,148 (total)
Median household income	$59,600	$48,096	$.N/A

References: 2021 2016 2011

Historical Census Data - Hinchinbrooke, Quebec

Year	Pop.	±%
1861	2,725	—
1871	2,441	−10.4%
1881	2,334	−4.4%
1891	2,209	−5.4%
1901	2,018	−8.6%
1911	1,740	−13.8%
1921	1,647	−5.3%
1931	1,658	+0.7%

Year	Pop.	±%
1941	1,619	−2.4%
1951	1,726	+6.6%
1956	1,634	−5.3%
1961	1,639	+0.3%
1966	1,742	+6.3%
1971	1,911	+9.7%
1976	1,871	−2.1%
1981	2,052	+9.7%

Year	Pop.	±%
1986	2,225	+8.4%
1991	2,392	+7.5%
1996	2,407	+0.6%
2001	2,380	−1.1%
2006	2,369	−0.5%
2011	2,242	−5.4%
2016	2,103	−6.2%
2021	2,187	+4.0%

Source: Statistics Canada

=== Language ===
Canada Census Mother Tongue - Hinchinbrooke, Quebec
Census	Total	French			English			French & English			Other		
Year	Responses	Count	Trend	Pop %	Count	Trend	Pop %	Count	Trend	Pop %	Count	Trend	Pop %
2021	2,190	955	▲4.4%	43.6%	1,065	▲1,9%	48.6%	60	▲50.0%	2.7%	90	0.0%	4.1%
2016	2,100	915	▼2.7%	43.6%	1,045	▼8.7%	49.8%	40	▲14.3%	1.9%	90	▼18.2%	4.3%
2011	2,230	940	▼10.9%	42.2%	1,145	▲7.5%	51.4%	35	▲75.0%	1.6%	110	▼50.0%	4.9%
2006	2,360	1,055	▼7.0%	44.7%	1,065	0.0%	45.1%	20	▼55.6%	0.9%	220	▲76.0%	9.3%
2001	2,370	1,135	▲29.0%	47.9%	1,065	▼21.4%	44.9%	45	▲28.6%	1.9%	125	▲4.2%	5.3%
1996	2,390	880	n/a	36.8%	1,355	n/a	56.7%	35	n/a	1.5%	120	n/a	5.0%

== Economy ==
The primary industries in Hinchinbrooke are agriculture, with dairy cattle and apple farming being the most prevalent sub-sectors.

== Attractions ==
The Powerscourt Covered Bridge over the Châteauguay River was originally built in 1861, and is now a National Historic Site of Canada.

== Government ==
List of former mayors:

- Normand Crête (...–2013)
- Carolyn Cameron (2013–2021)
- Mark Wallace (2021–present)

== Notable people ==
Sir William Hales Hingston, physician and mayor of Montreal from 1875 to 1877, was born in Hinchinbrooke.

== See also ==
- List of anglophone communities in Quebec
- List of municipalities in Quebec
