= Ormstown =

- Municipality
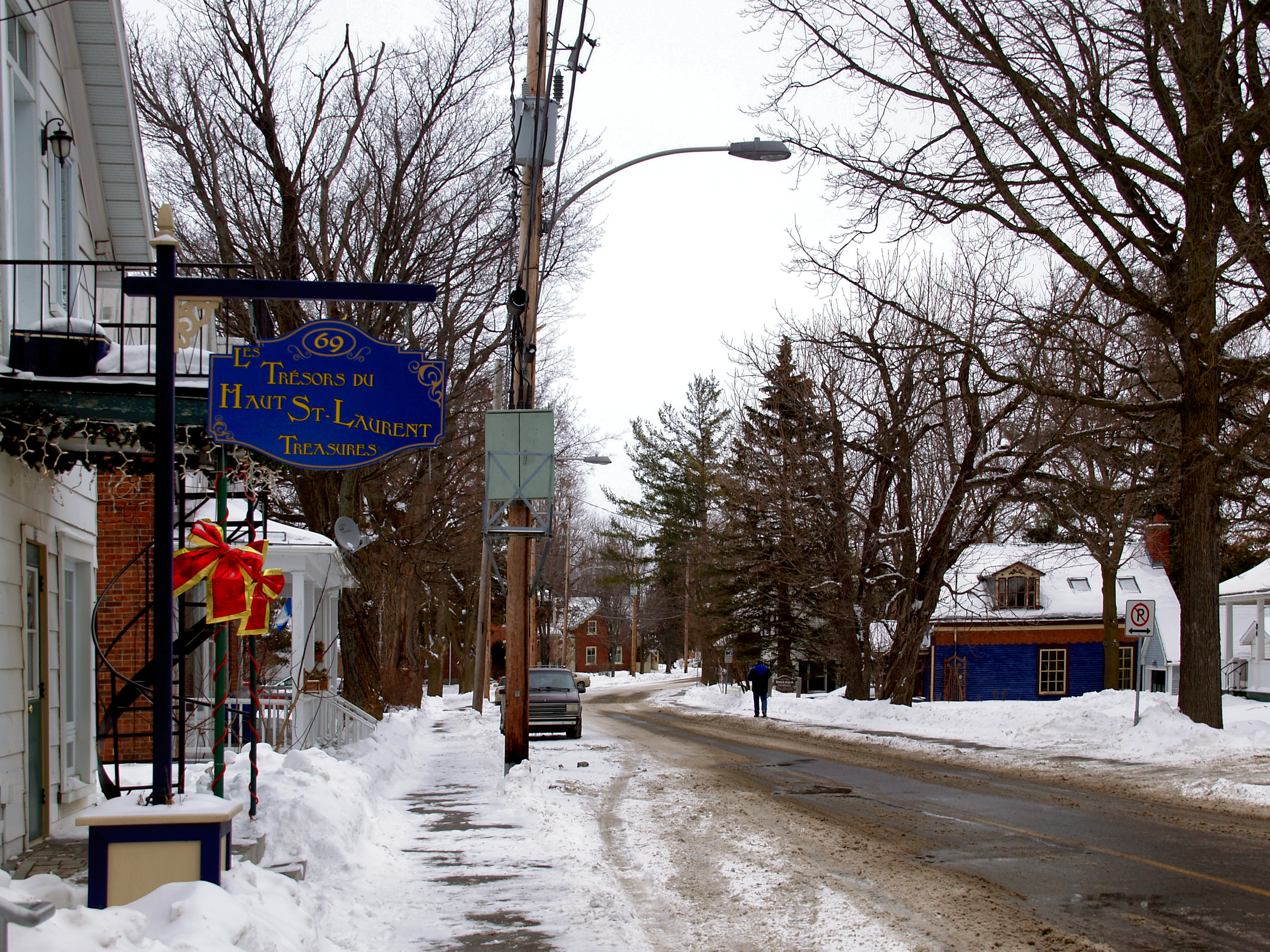

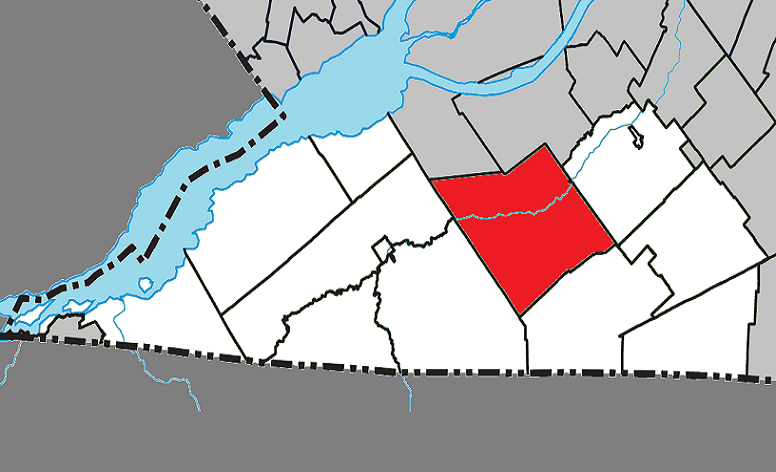
- Location within Le Haut-Saint-Laurent RCM

- Location in southern Quebec
- Coordinates: 45°07′37″N 73°59′45″W
- Country: Canada
- Province: Quebec
- Region: Montérégie
- RCM: Le Haut-Saint-Laurent
- Constituted: January 26, 2000

Government
  - Mayor: Christine McAleer
  - Federal riding: Beauharnois—Salaberry—Soulanges—Huntingdon
  - Prov. riding: Huntingdon

Area
  - Total: 143.72 km^{2} (55.49 sq mi)
  - Land: 142.24 km^{2} (54.92 sq mi)

Population (2021)
  - Total: 3,917
  - Density: 27.5/km^{2} (71/sq mi)
  - Pop (2016-21): ▲9.0%
  - Dwellings: 1,788
- Time zone: UTC−5 (EST)
  - Summer (DST): UTC−4 (EDT)
- Postal code(s): J0S 1K0
- Area codes: 450 and 579
- Highways: R-138 R-201
- Website: www.ormstown.ca

Ormstown is a municipality in Quebec, Canada, which is situated on the Châteauguay River in the heart of the Châteauguay Valley. It is approximately one hour southwest of Montreal and 20 minutes north of New York State in the United States. The population as of the 2021 Canadian census was 3,917.

Ormstown has two elementary schools, one high school (Chateauguay Valley Regional), and two adult education facilities, several restaurants and churches. Ormstown is also well known for its numerous antique dealers and unique gift shops. There is a park north of the centre of town which is home to Ormstown Beach, an urban legend created and memorialized in the 1970s with "I've been to Ormstown Beach" bumper stickers. It is a popular summer activity to cycle along the Châteauguay River. The town has traces of an old dam, which was once the source of power for the mill. People living outside the town only gained access to electricity following World War II.

== History ==
Settlement of the area began in the early 19th century and by 1820, it was populated by people from Scotland and the north of Ireland. There is uncertainty about the origin of the name Ormstown, possibly a distortion of "Ormiston", a Scottish village. Around 1860 it was also called Durham.

In 1808, a sawmill was built, followed by a Presbyterian church in 1829 and an Anglican church in 1832. In 1836, the Ormstown Post Office opened, and in 1846, the Catholic parish was established under the name Saint-Malachie-d'Ormstown, in honour of Saint Malachy.

In 1845, the Municipality of Ormstown was founded, but dissolved in 1847. In 1855, it was reestablished as the Parish Municipality of Saint-Malachie-d’Ormstown. In 1889, the main town centre split off to form the Village Municipality of Ormstown.

In the 1950s, Ormstown became the site of a significant microwave radio relay station, part of the Trans Canada Telephone System. Initially, the system passed through the major cities of Canada via towers located on top of downtown telephone buildings. Subsequently, concerns were expressed that a disaster affecting any of those city cores, such as a war or uprising, would result in an interruption of the continuity of the transcontinental communications system. The solution was to locate a "bypass" microwave site outside each of those cities with links to the east and west, as well as a short link into the city. The Ormstown facility was the bypass point for Montreal, but had further significance as it also included a link to the AT&T Long Lines TD2 microwave system in the United States.

In 2000, the village municipality merged with the surrounding parish municipality of St-Malachie d'Ormstown to form the Municipality of Ormstown.

== Geography ==
=== Communities ===
In addition to the main population centre of Ormstown, the following locations reside within the municipality's boundaries:

- Tatehurst (45°08′32″N 74°00′54″W) – a hamlet located in the northern portion along Route 201.

=== Lakes & Rivers ===
The following waterways pass through or are situated within the municipality's boundaries:

- Étang Greig (Greig Pond) (45°07′03″N 73°54′19″W) – a pond in the eastern portion.
- Rivière aux Outardes (Outardes River) (Mouth 45°07′21″N 74°00′11″W) – tributary of the Châteauguay River.
- Rivière aux Outardes Est (East Outardes River) (Mouth 45°06′01″N 74°03′54″W) – tributary of Rivière aux Outardes.
- Châteauguay River – flows west to east through the municipality.

== Demographics ==
=== Population ===
Canada census – Ormstown community profile

	2021	2016	2011
Population	3,917 (+9.0% from 2016)	3,595 (0.0% from 2011)	3,595 (-1.5% from 2006)
Land area	142.24 km^{2} (54.92 sq mi)	142.79 km^{2} (55.13 sq mi)	142.19 km^{2} (54.90 sq mi)
Population density	27.5/km^{2} (71/sq mi)	25.2/km^{2} (65/sq mi)	25.3/km^{2} (66/sq mi)
Median age	47.2 (M: 45.2, F: 50.0)	49.0 (M: 47.4, F: 50.6)	47.0 (M: 45.6, F: 47.7)
Private dwellings	1,788 (total) 1,706 (occupied)	1,641 (total) 1,542 (occupied)	1,516 (total)
Median household income	$65,000	$52,736	$.N/A

Notes: 2011 income data for this area has been suppressed for data quality or confidentiality reasons.
References: 2021 2016 2011

Historical Census Data - Ormstown, Quebec

Year	Pop.	±%
1976	3,676	—
1981	3,775	+2.7%
1986	3,661	−3.0%
1991	3,678	+0.5%
1996	3,700	+0.6%

Year	Pop.	±%
2001	3,647	−1.4%
2006	3,651	+0.1%
2011	3,595	−1.5%
2016	3,595	+0.0%
2021	3,917	+9.0%

Population amounts prior to 2000 are total of Ormstown (Village) and Saint-Malachie-d'Ormstown (Parish).
Source: Statistics Canada

=== Language ===
Canada Census Mother Tongue - Ormstown, Quebec
Census	Total	French			English			French & English			Other		
Year	Responses	Count	Trend	Pop %	Count	Trend	Pop %	Count	Trend	Pop %	Count	Trend	Pop %
2016	3,465	2,145	▼0.7%	61.90%	1,160	▼3.7%	33.48%	75	▲15.4%	2.16%	70	▲7.7%	2.02%
2011	3,495	2,160	▼2.7%	61.80%	1,205	0.0%	34.48%	65	▲30.0%	1.86%	65	▲18.2%	1.86%
2006	3,530	2,220	▼1.1%	62.89%	1,205	▲3.0%	34.13%	50	0.0%	1.42%	55	▼21.4%	1.56%
2001	3,535	2,245	▲152.2%	63.51%	1,170	▲103.5%	33.10%	50	▲66.7%	1.41%	70	▲600.0%	1.98%
1996	1,505	890	n/a	59.14%	575	n/a	38.21%	30	n/a	1.99%	10	n/a	0.66%

== Attractions ==
=== Expo Ormstown ===
One of the town's main attractions is the Expo Ormstown—formally known as the Ormstown Fair—which was started in 1910. It is held annually during the second week of June, making it Quebec's earliest spring fair. Several competitions take place at the fair: farm animals, crafts, horticulture and baked goods are evaluated by judges and can be viewed by fair goers. Other competitions include a tractor pull, demolition derby, and equestrian events. Additionally, there are carnival rides, arcades, a petting zoo, and live musical performances. The Ormstown fair attracts people from all surrounding areas.

== Government ==
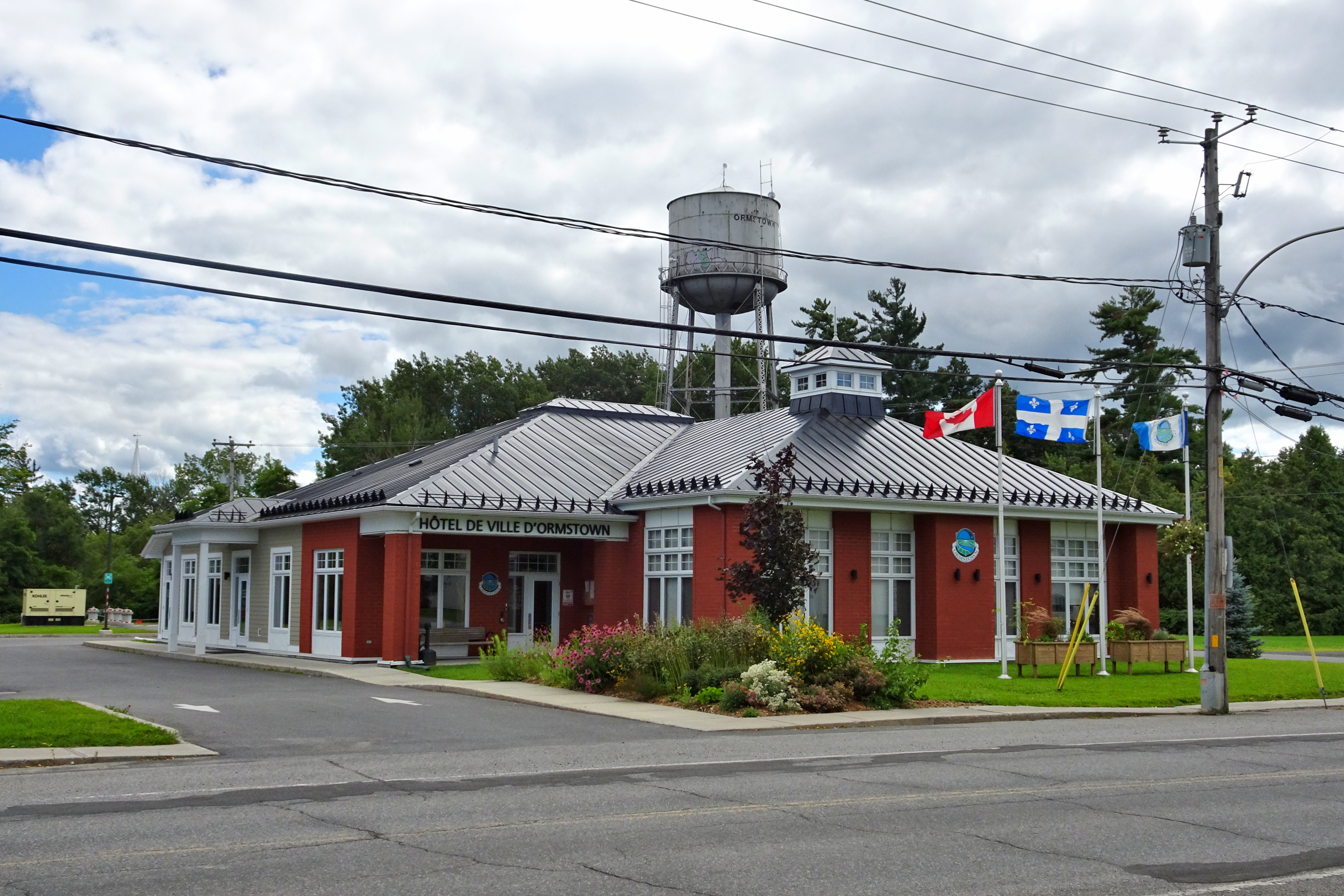
Ormstown town hall

Jacques Lapierre was elected to fill the post of mayor on November 1, 2009, replacing interim mayor Luc Lavigueur. Lavigueur took over the post after former mayor John McCaig resigned for health reasons.

List of former mayors since formation of current municipality:

1. Madeleine Himbault Greig (2000–2001)
2. John McCaig (2001–2008)
3. Luc Lavigueur (2008–2009)
4. Jacques Lapierre (2009–2013, 2017–2021)
5. Jean Côté (2013–2014)
6. Chrystian Soucy (2014–2017)
7. Christine McAleer (2021–present)

== Infrastructure ==
=== Transportation ===
Exo du Haut-Saint-Laurent formerly provided commuter and local bus services, but these have been replaced by services provided by the Haut-Saint-Laurent Regional County Municipality.

== See also ==
- List of anglophone communities in Quebec
- List of municipalities in Quebec
- Vladimir Katriuk
