= Chateauguay Valley =

Coordinates: 45°21′40″N 73°45′00″W

The Chateauguay Valley is an area of southwestern Quebec Canada, roughly encompassing the drainage basin of the Châteauguay River which flows from the Adirondack Mountains in northern New York state and joins the Saint Lawrence River near Montreal, Quebec.

The Valley is mainly made up of rural communities and is known for its agriculture and apple orchards.

It includes the area roughly stretching from Dundee and Huntingdon in the west to Hemmingford in the east and north to Châteauguay.
