= Châteauguay River =

River in the United States and Canada

Châteauguay River Chateaugay River
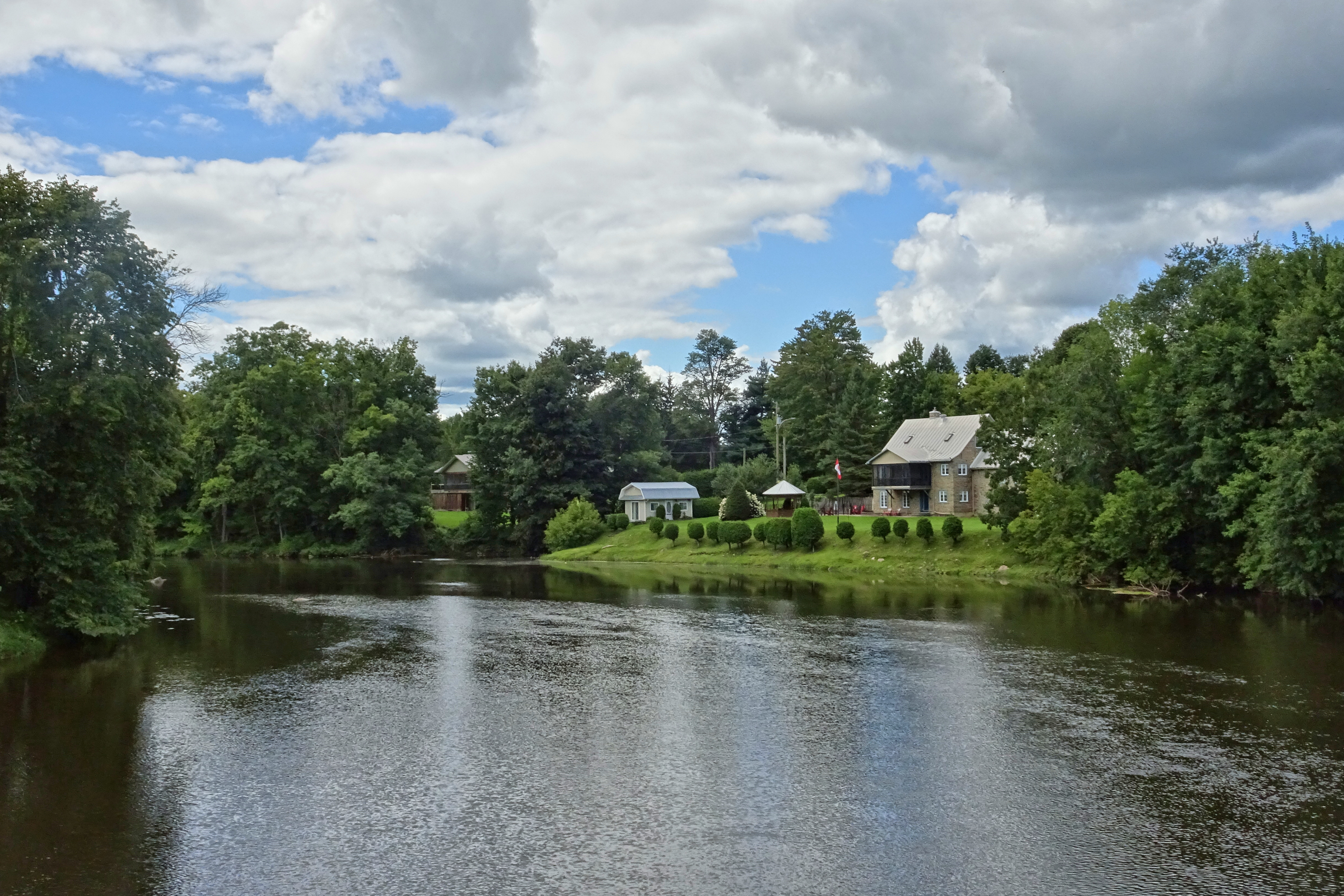
- Chateauguay River at Dewittville

Location
- Countries: United States, Canada
- Locations: New York, Quebec

Physical characteristics
- Mouth: St. Lawrence River
  - location: Châteauguay, Quebec, Canada
  - coordinates: 45°24′04″N 73°45′07″W
  - elevation: 22 metres (72 ft)
- Length: 121 km (75 mi)
- Basin size: 2,543.4 km^{2} (982.0 sq mi)

Basin features
- Tributaries
  - left: (upstream) streams in Canada: Saucier, Pouliot, Riendeau-Huot, Le Grand Marais, Bergevin, Péladeau, Turcot, Lefebvre, Georges-Vinet, La Grande Décharge, Riendeau, J.-W.-Mart, McClintock, McArdle, Dewitt, Hall, Cowan, Cunningham, Beaver.
  - right: (upstream) streams in Canada: Esturgeon river, Rose-Dulude, Riendeau-Tessier, Pécharart discharge, Feves river, English River, McCormick, Hastie, Sculy-Dubeau, Smith, Outardes River, Cluff, Schyler Landfill, Trout River, Murray.

The Châteauguay River (or Chateaugay River in the United States) is a tributary of the South Shore of the St. Lawrence River, flowing in:

- Clinton County and Franklin County, in the Adirondacks, in New York State, United States;
- the Le Haut-Saint-Laurent Regional County Municipality: crossing the municipalities of Huntingdon, Ormstown and Howick, in Montérégie region, Quebec, Canada;
- the MRC of Beauharnois-Salaberry Regional County Municipality: municipality of Sainte-Martine, in Montérégie;
- the MRC of Roussillon Regional County Municipality: city of Mercier, in Montérégie.

This valley is mainly served by the following roads:

- in Quebec (East side, from the mouth): boulevard Salaberry Nord, boulevard Salaberry Sud, chemin du rang Roy, chemin de la Beauce, rue Saint-Joseph, boulevard Saint-Jean-Baptiste-Ouest (route 138), Island Road, Fairview Road, Athelstan Road, Montée de Powerscour;
- in Quebec (West side, from the mouth): boulevard D'Youville, chemin de la Haute-Rivière, chemin du Grand-Marais, chemin du rang Dubuc, chemin du rang Touchette, chemin du rang Laberge, chemin de la Rivière-Châteauguay, rue Lambton, route 138A, route 138 (rue Châteauguay), ascent Gillmore, ascent Shearer;
- in New York State (East side, from the border): Simms Road, Chasm Road, Commons Road, Lake Street (NY 374);
- in New York State (west side, from the border): Lewis Road, Cemetery Road, Healy Road, Chase Road, Merrill Road, Lake Road, Narrows Road, Gadway Road.

The river surface is generally frozen from mid-December to the end of March. Safe circulation on the ice is generally done from the end of December to the beginning of March. The water level of the river varies with the seasons and the precipitation.

== Geography ==
The geographic slopes bordering the Châteauguay River are, to the north the St. Lawrence River (including the St. Lawrence Seaway), to the east the Noire River and the Lacolle River, to the west the Saint-Louis River.

It winds its way northward through several towns and villages in Quebec, Canada, such as Elgin, Hinchinbrooke, Huntingdon, Dewittville, Ormstown and Châteauguay, before emptying into the Saint Lawrence River near Montreal.

The Châteauguay River originates at Upper Chateauguay Lake (length: 3.0 kilometres (1.9 mi); altitude: ), in Clinton County, New York, in New York State, in Adirondacks.

The Châteauguay River flows over 106.8 kilometres (66.4 mi), with a drop of , according to the following segments:

Upper course of the river, in American territory (segment of 32.9 kilometres (20.4 mi))

- 8.0 kilometres (5.0 mi) north-west in a small mountain valley, entering in Franklin County, New York and crossing Lake Lower Chateauguay (length: 3.0 kilometres (1.9 mi); altitude: ), to its mouth;
- 24.9 kilometres (15.5 mi) north-west in a deep valley with numerous stream branches, collecting a small river (coming from the east) and a stream (coming from the south-west), passing on the west side of town of Chateaugay where the river crosses the Highway US11, up to at the Canadian border;

Intermediate course of the river, down the Canada-US border (segment of 53.7 kilometres (33.4 mi))

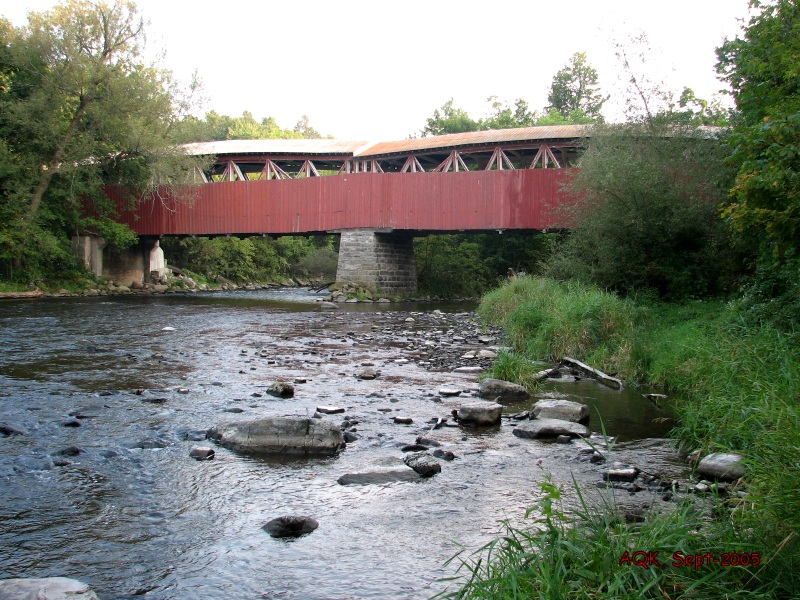
Powerscourt Covered Bridge over the Châteauguay River at Powerscourt, Hinchinbrooke

- 7.9 kilometres (4.9 mi) towards the northwest by forming some streamers in the forest zone, then forming a curve towards the west in the agricultural zone, up to the Hinchinbrooke River (coming from East);
- 5.7 kilometres (3.5 mi) to the north in Quebec in the forest and then agricultural zones, forming a loop to the southwest to pick up the Dawson-Bring stream, up to the confluence of the Trout River (coming from the southwest);
- 11.4 kilometres (7.1 mi) first towards the north by crossing the city center of Huntingdon, then towards the northeast by collecting the Cunningham stream (coming from the 'west) and Cowan Creek (coming from the west), forming an S where it collects Cluff Creek (coming from the south), up to the village bridge of Dewittville;
- 7.9 kilometres (4.9 mi) north-east, until the confluence of the rivière aux Outardes (coming from the south-west);
- 7.4 kilometres (4.6 mi) north-west passing under the bridge of route 138, crossing the village of Ormstown, collecting the stream Reid (from the southeast) and Riendeau Brook (from the northwest), to the hamlet Bryson;
- 13.4 kilometres (8.3 mi) towards the north by immediately forming a hook towards the west to collect the Lacroix-Cross watercourse, passing under the hamlet bridge Allan's Corners, collecting the Turcot stream ( coming from the west), by forming a hook towards the east at the end of the segment, until the confluence of the rivière des Anglais (coming from the south);

Lower course, downstream from the rivière des Anglais (segment of 20.2 kilometres (12.6 mi))

- 2.8 kilometres (1.7 mi) towards the north by forming a small hook towards the west, until the confluence of the Feves river (coming from the east);
- 4.1 kilometres (2.5 mi) towards the north by forming a large S, then passing on the west side of the village of Sainte-Martine, until the confluence of the rivière de l'Esturgeon (coming from the east);
- 12.0 kilometres (7.5 mi) in the agricultural area to the north by forming a hook towards the west where it collects the discharge from Le Grand Marais (coming from the south), passing under the bridge on Chemin de la Beauce, by collecting Pouliot stream (coming from the southwest), then branching northwest, to the bridge of autoroute 30;
- 3.0 kilometres (1.9 mi) in urban areas, first towards the north, passing under the René-Lévesque boulevard bridge, then branching westwards forming a large S, up to the rue Principal (west side) and rue d'Anjou (east side);
- 4.9 kilometres (3.0 mi) towards the north-west in an urban area, passing first under the railway bridge, then under the bridge of Chemin Saint-Bernard which passes over the south-eastern point of the island Saint Bernard; thence, the river makes a Y to go around Saint-Bernard Island on 2.4 kilometres (1.5 mi) to the north or on 1.8 kilometres (1.1 mi) to the west, bypassing the point from the north from Châteauguay-Station, to its mouth.

The river is home to many species of birds and fish and is a major stopping-point for migrating ducks and Canada geese.

Although polluted for many years, the river has been cleaned up and is beginning to be an eco-tourism destination for canoeing and kayaking.

The drainage basin and surrounding area is known as the Chateauguay Valley.

== Battle of the Châteauguay ==
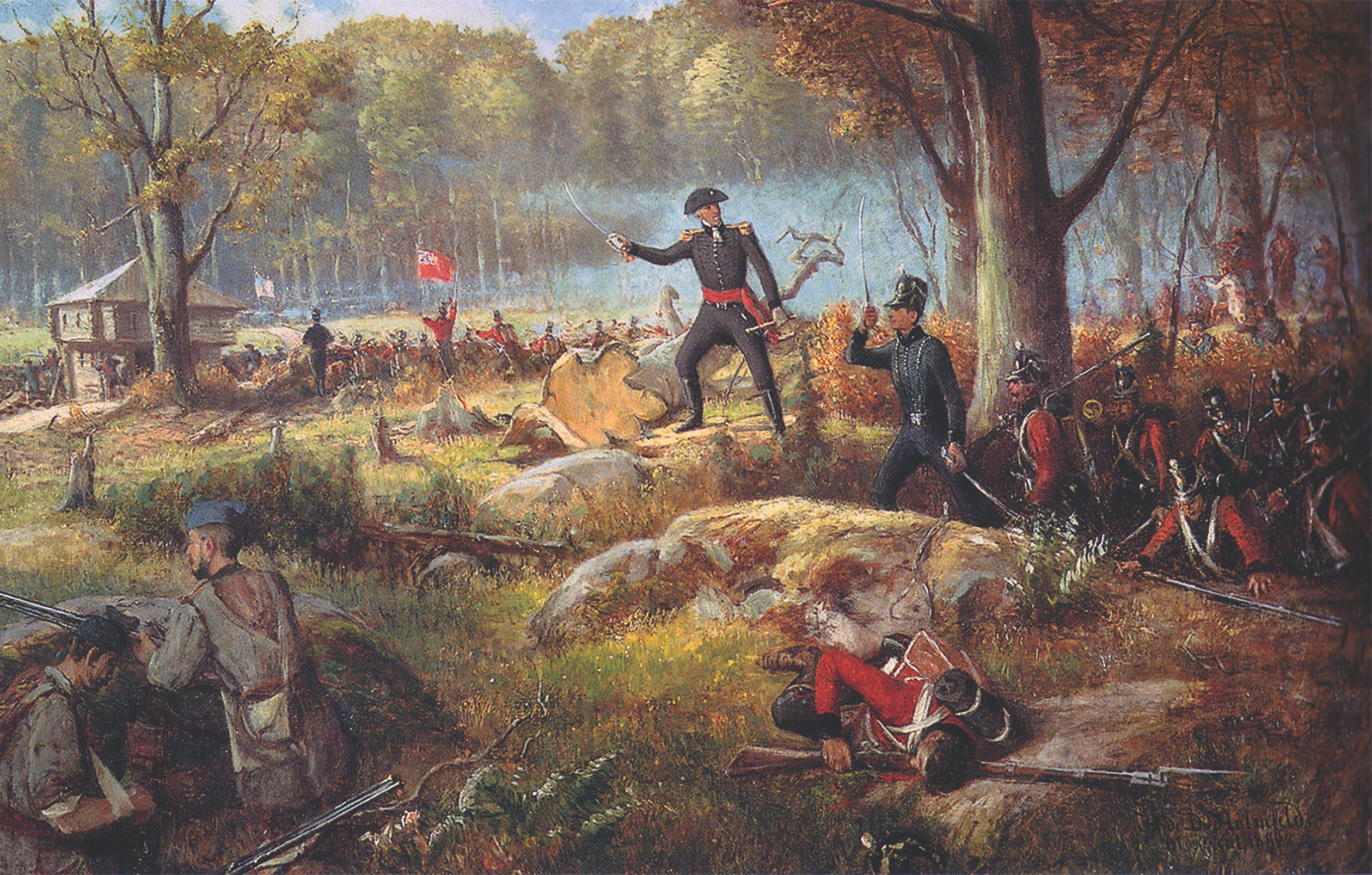
Canadian forces at the Battle of the Châteauguay, October 26, 1813, firing on American troops in the river valley

The Châteauguay River was the site of a significant battle during the War of 1812. In 1813, an American army was advancing north to try to capture Montreal. A Canadian force, composed of Canadian regular and militia units, and First Nations warriors, defeated the American forces at the battle of the Châteauguay on October 26, 1813. The battle kept Montreal from falling into American hands, which had major strategic value for keeping Upper Canada supplied and in communication with British forces in Lower Canada.

== See also ==
- List of New York rivers
- List of Quebec rivers
