= Châteauguay =

- City
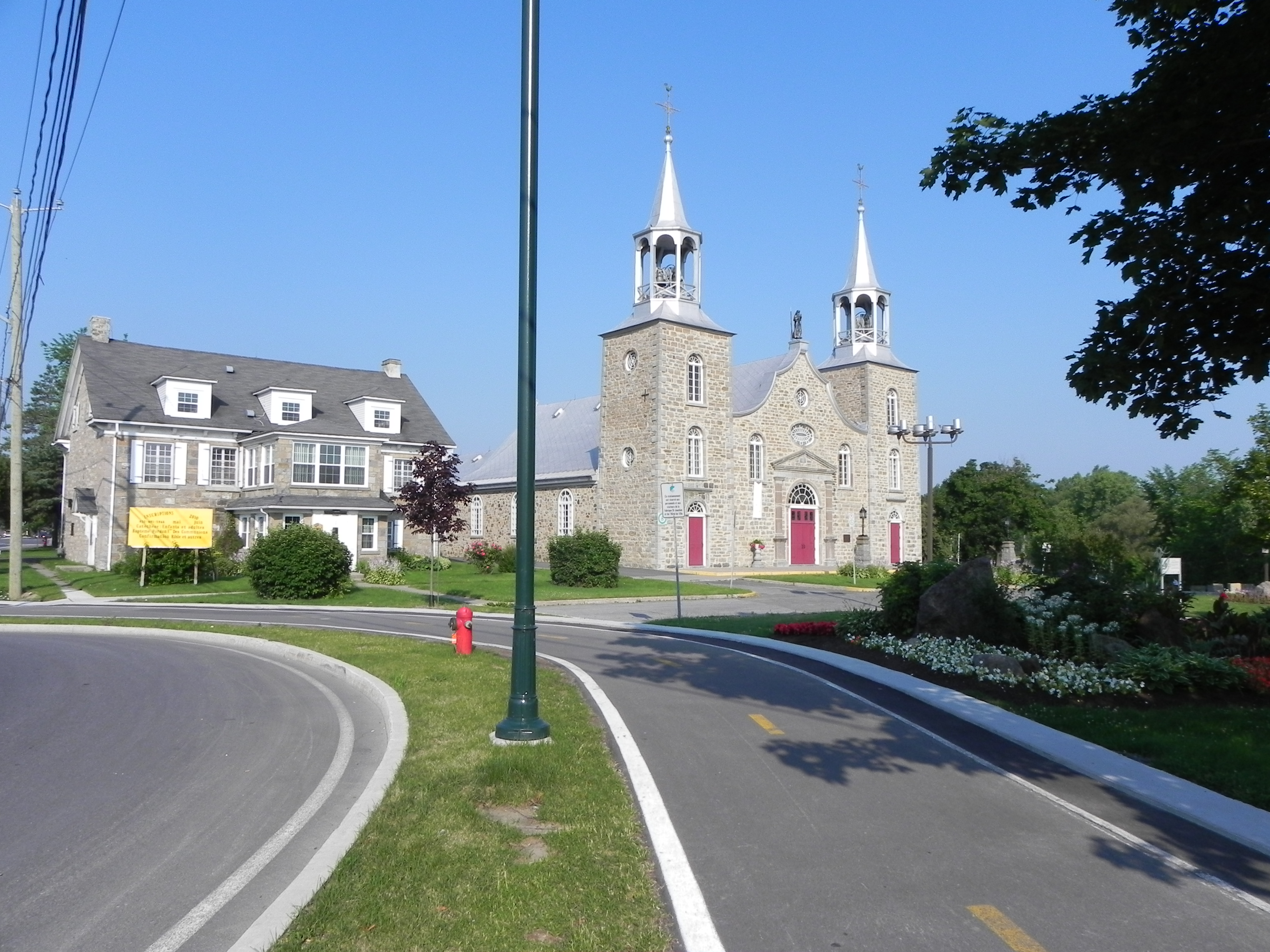

- Coat of arms
- Motto: Unita Fortior (Latin: "Stronger when United")
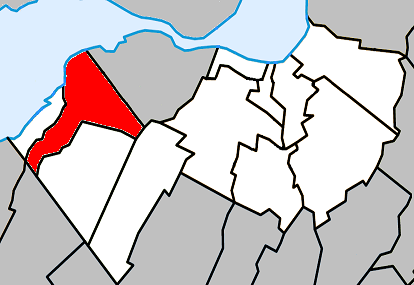
- Location within Roussillon RCM

- Location in southern Quebec
- Coordinates: 45°23′N 73°45′W
- Country: Canada
- Province: Quebec
- Region: Montérégie
- RCM: Roussillon
- Constituted: November 3, 1975

Government
  - Mayor: Éric Allard
  - Federal riding: Châteauguay—Les Jardins-de-Napierville
  - Prov. riding: Châteauguay

Area
  - City: 46.50 km^{2} (17.95 sq mi)
  - Land: 34.31 km^{2} (13.25 sq mi)
  - Urban: 50.48 km^{2} (19.49 sq mi)

Population (2021)
  - City: 50,815
  - Density: 1,481.2/km^{2} (3,836/sq mi)
  - Urban: 75,891
  - Urban density: 1,503.4/km^{2} (3,894/sq mi)
  - Pop 2016-2021: ▲6.1%
  - Dwellings: 20,412
- Time zone: UTC−5 (EST)
  - Summer (DST): UTC−4 (EDT)
- Postal code(s): J6J, J6K
- Area codes: 450 and 579
- Highways A-30: R-132; R-138
- Website: www.ville.chateauguay.qc.ca

Châteauguay (English: /ˈʃætoʊɡeɪ/ SHAT-oh-gay, French: [ʃɑtoɡɛ], locally [-ɡe]) is an off-island suburb of Montreal, in southwestern Quebec, located on both the Châteauguay River and Lac St-Louis, which is a section of the St. Lawrence River. The population of the city of Châteauguay at the 2021 Census was 50,815, and the population centre was 75,891.

== History ==
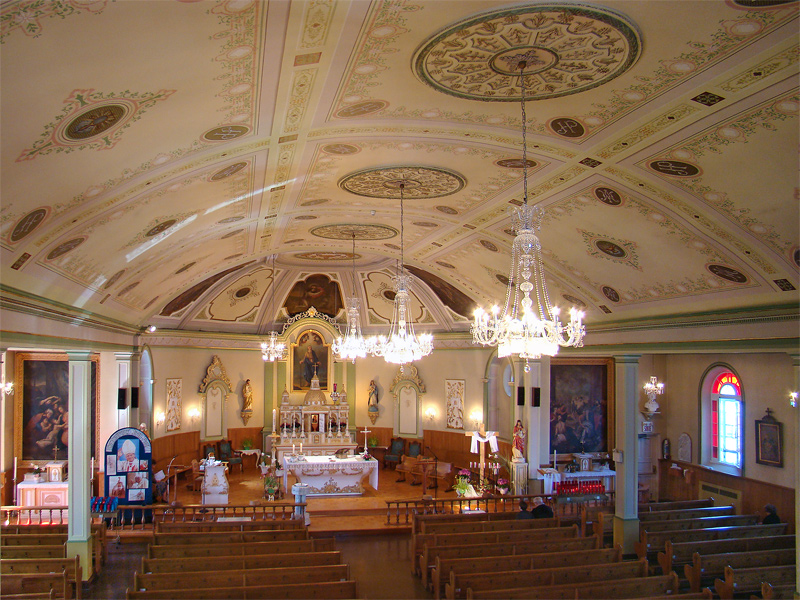
Church of Saint-Joachim, a National Historic Site of Canada

The land was first given to Charles Lemoyne by the governor of New France at the time, the Comte de Frontenac with the intention of setting up a seigneurie in the area. Afterwards the seigneurie was assumed by Zacharie Robutel de la Noue in 1706. In 1763 France relinquished its claims in Canada and Châteauguay was now under British mandate. The seigneurie was bought by Marguerite d'Youville, a founder of the Quebec religious society the Grey Nuns in 1765 and 10 years later construction began on the Church of Saint-Joachim.

Châteauguay played an important part in the colonial history of North America. With the United States having declared war on Britain in 1812, Châteauguay was seen as little more than a good vantage point to post troops to defend Montreal against an invasion. This prong of the American advance on Montreal ended with the Battle of the Châteauguay, where on October 26, 1813, Lieutenant Colonel Charles de Salaberry succeeded in halting the American force of 4,000 advancing on Montreal with only some 400 troops, mostly French-Canadian and 170 Kahnawake Mohawk warriors. The second American incursion towards Montreal was defeated shortly after at Crysler's Farm on November 11.

During the Lower Canada Rebellion, Châteauguay was the scene of a notable action involving the Patriote movement. In November 1838, members of the rebel group, including some of their leaders, were arrested: François-Maurice Lepailleur, who was later exiled to Australia, and two natives of Châteauguay, Joseph Duquet and Joseph-Narcisse Cardinal, both of whom were later hanged at Au-Pied-du-Courant Prison and subsequently interred beneath a monument to the Patriotes at Notre-Dame-des-Neiges Cemetery in Montreal.

The actual village of Châteauguay was created in 1855, after the abolition of the seigneurie system in Quebec by the United Province of Canada. Later on the city annexed two neighbouring districts, Châteauguay-Heights (1968) and Châteauguay-Centre (1975). In 1982, with the passage of the Loi sur l'aménagement et l'urbanisme, Québec, the city became part of the Roussillon Regional County Municipality.

== Demographics ==
Historical Census Data - Châteauguay, Quebec
Year	Pop.	±%
1991	39,833	—
1996	41,423	+4.0%
2001	41,003	−1.0%
2006	42,786	+4.3%
2011	45,904	+7.3%
2016	47,906	+4.4%
2021	50,815	+6.1%

In the 2021 Census of Population conducted by Statistics Canada, Châteauguay had a population of 50,815 living in 19,917 of its 20,412 total private dwellings, a change of 6.1% from its 2016 population of 47,906. With a land area of 34.31 km^{2} (13.25 sq mi), it had a population density of 1,481.1/km^{2} (3,835.9/sq mi) in 2021.

Canada census – Châteauguay community profile

	2021	2011
Population	50,815 (+6.1% from 2016)	45,904 (+7.3% from 2006)
Land area	34.31 km^{2} (13.25 sq mi)	35.89 km^{2} (13.86 sq mi)
Population density	1,481.2/km^{2} (3,836/sq mi)	1,278.9/km^{2} (3,312/sq mi)
Median age	42.8 (M: 41.6, F: 44.0)	42.2 (M: 40.9, F: 43.6)
Private dwellings	20,412 (total) 19,917 (occupied)	18,429 (total)
Median household income	$79,000	$58,008

References: 2021 2011

Châteauguay has traditionally had one of the highest proportions of English speakers in the Montérégie region. As according to the 2021 census, The prominent languages primarily spoken at home by their relative share of the population are French (56%), English (29%) and Spanish (2%).

53.4% of residents speak French as a mother tongue. Other common first languages are English (25.1%), Spanish (3.1%), Russian (2.0%), Arabic (1.9%), and Romanian (1.2%). 3.0% claim both French and English as mother tongues, while 1.1% claim both French and a non-official language.

As of 2021, Châteauguay is 66.3% Christian, down from 84.0% in 2011. 46.5% are Catholic, 7.2% are Christian n.o.s and 5.5% are Protestant. All other Christian denominations and Christian-related traditions made up 7.0% of the population including a significant community of Christian Orthodox believers (3.1%). 25.6% of residents were non-religious or secular, up from 12.1% in 2011. Other religions account for 8.1% of the population. The largest non-Christian religion is Islam, at 6.5% of residents (2.3% in 2011).

Châteauguay is 74.3% white/European, 2.7% Indigenous and 23.0% visible minorities. The largest visible minority groups are Black (11.5%), Arab (3.3%), Latin American (3.1%), and South Asian (1.5%). Châteauguay holds the highest percentage, outside of the Island of Montreal, of Black population in Quebec, which is mostly concentrated in the easternmost part of the city.

Ethnic and Cultural origins (2021)	Population	Percent
Canadian	12,020	24.0%
French n.o.s	8,540	17.1%
Québécois	4,015	8.0%
Irish	5,180	10.4%
French Canadian	2,425	4.9%
Scottish	3,120	6.2%
English	2,745	5.5%
Italian	2,480	5.0%
German	1,215	2.4%
Caucasian (White) n.o.s+ European n.o.s	1,165	2.3%
First Nations (North American Indian) n.o.s.+ North American Indigenous, n.o.s.	1,055	2.1%
Note: Includes multiple responses

Canada Census Mother Tongue - Châteauguay, Quebec
Census	Total	French			English			French & English			Other		
Year	Responses	Count	Trend	Pop %	Count	Trend	Pop %	Count	Trend	Pop %	Count	Trend	Pop %
2021	50,440	26,950	▼1.7%	53.4%	12,645	▲3.7%	25.1%	1,495	▲74.9%	3.0%	8,105	▲27.5%	16.1%
2016	47,585	27,405	▲0.0%	57.6%	12,195	▼0.5%	25.6%	855	▲11.7%	1.8%	6,355	▲34.4%	13.4%
2011	45,130	27,385	▲0.4%	60.7%	12,250	▲14.4%	27.1%	765	▲93.7%	1.7%	4,730	▲32.1%	10.5%
2006	41,970	27,285	▲1.5%	65.0%	10,710	▼1.9%	25.5%	395	▼21.8%	0.9%	3,580	▲55.7%	8.5%
2001	40,600	26,875	▲2.2%	66.2%	10,920	▼9.3%	26.9%	505	▲11.0%	1.2%	2,300	▲8.5%	5.7%
1996	40,905	26,285	n/a	64.3%	12,045	n/a	29.5%	455	n/a	1.1%	2,120	n/a	5.2%

== Government ==
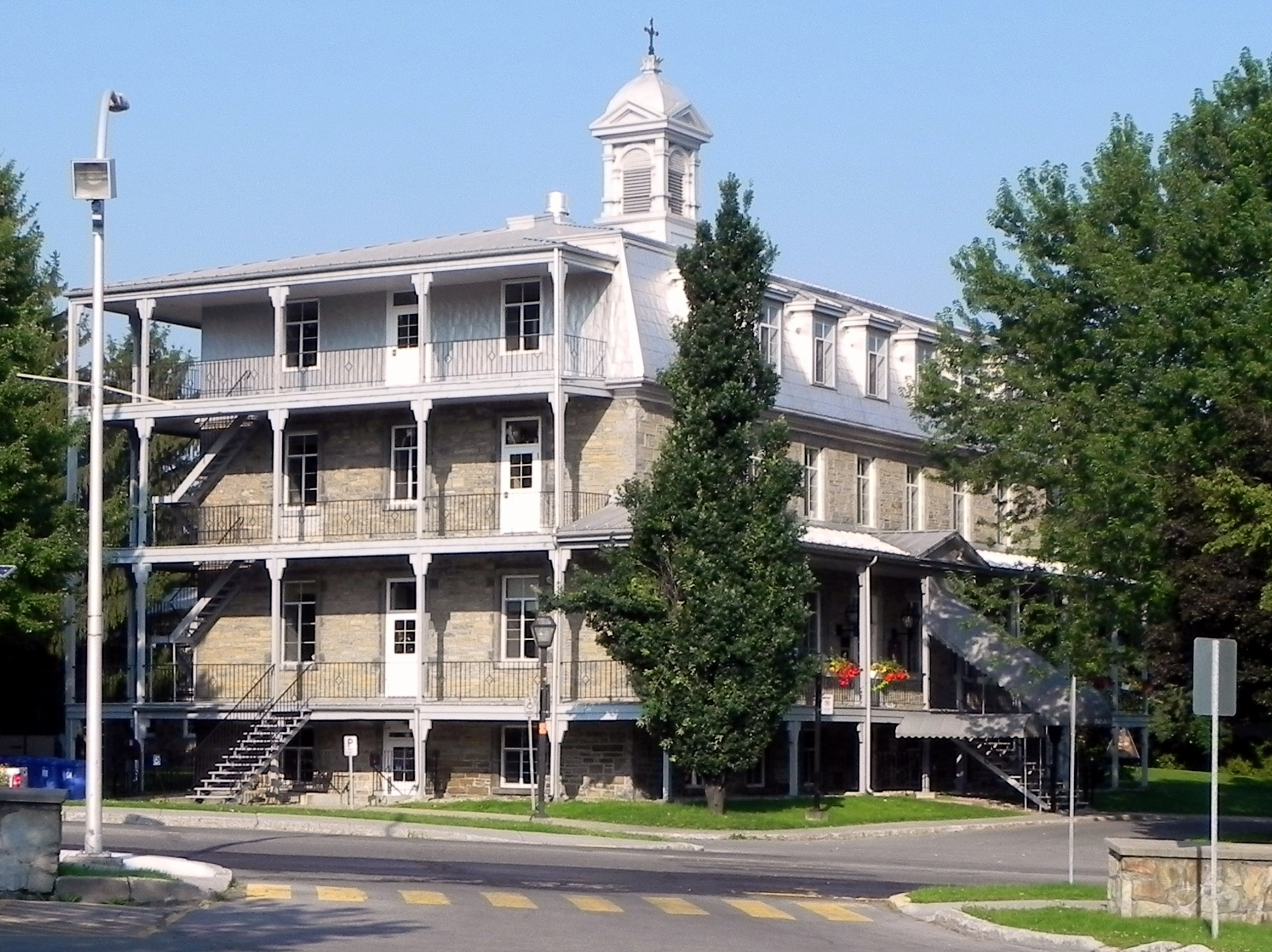
Town hall of Châteauguay

The current mayor of Châteauguay is Eric Allard who won election in November 2021.

Allard served as a city council member under the previous mayor, Pierre-Paul Routhier. Routhier was mayor from 2017 to 2021, and was preceded by Nathalie Simon who was elected mayor in 2009.

== Infrastructure ==
=== Public security ===
The Châteauguay Police have more than 130 police officers. Their duties include investigations, crime prevention and routine city patrols. The force also participates in many community efforts. The majority of these outreach programs are aimed at Châteauguay youth and focus on the prevention of drug and alcohol use which is widespread among the youth (up to 78% of the teens have used a drug on the course of last month according to a survey). The force, originally having only jurisdiction within the city limits expanded its jurisdiction over the nearby cities of Léry, Mercier, Beauharnois and Saint-Isidore between 2002 and 2007 through agreements between the municipalities. However, Mercier set up an independent policing system in 2019.

=== Utilities ===
Since 1984, Châteauguay has been home to one of the largest HVDC-back-to-back stations in the world with an operating voltage of 140 kV and a maximum transmission rate of 1000 MW.

== Transport ==
=== Public transit ===
Public transportation is assured by CITSO (Conseil Intermunicipal de Transport du Sud-Ouest). They run two Châteauguay-Angrignon loop bus routes circulating in opposite directions. A city minibus transfers commuters from the western part of the suburb to the downtown, where the other off-peak routes pass. During rush hours, more bus routes connect the various neighbourhoods with the Angrignon bus terminal and metro station. A special express bus route connects western Châteauguay and the Châteauguay Park-and-ride with downtown Montreal, only during rush hours. A reserved lane on Highway 138 eastbound makes the connection significantly faster when the Mercier Bridge is congested. The Châteauguay public transit system also offers a Taxi-Bus service which allows those people who live outside of the normal bus routes to, by way of transfer, use a taxi funded by CITSO to drop them off at specific points in the city usually within walking distance of their residence.

== Education ==
The majority of the education institutions within Châteauguay are public, with the exception of Collège Héritage. A small list of Châteauguay schools includes:

- Collège Héritage - Semi-private high school for French-speaking students (also houses 5th and 6th grade elementary school students).
- Howard S. Billings Regional High School - High school for English-speaking students.
- Louis-Philippe-Paré, more commonly known as L.P.P. - High school for French-speaking students.
- Gabrielle-Roy - Middle school for French-speaking students.
- Centennial Park Elementary - Elementary school for English-speaking students (sometimes known as CPS).
- St-Jude - Elementary school for French-speaking students.
- Mary Gardner - Elementary school for English-speaking students.
- École de La Rive - Elementary school for French-speaking students.
- Laberge - Elementary school for French-speaking students.
- Harmony School - Elementary school for English-speaking students.
- St-Jean-Baptiste - Elementary school for French-speaking students.
- St. Willibrord - Elementary school for English-speaking students.
- Gérin-Lajoie - Elementary school for French-speaking students.
- Notre-Dame-de-l'Assomption - Elementary school for French-speaking students.
- Marguerite-Bourgeoys - Middle school for French-speaking students.
- Trois-Sources - Elementary school for French-speaking students.
- Marc-André Fortier - Elementary school for French-speaking students.

NOVA Career Centre for adult students recently established itself in a building adjacent to Howard S. Billings. It was previously located in the school building.

During the 1980s, three English elementary schools became French due to a demographic shift:

- St-Paul School: The first, an English Catholic elementary school. It remained at the time property of the Commission Scolaire de Châteauguay. It was later renamed École des Trois Sources.
- Julius Richardson: The oldest of the English elementary schools in Châteauguay. It closed in the early 80s and became the Centre l'Accore d'Abottsford, later becoming an adult education centre. It was a school belonging to the then "Chateauguay Valley School Board" before being ceded to the "Commission Scolaire de Châteauguay".
- Robert A. Jobber: The final English school to close. It was shuttered at the end of the 1987–88 school year. During its final years, classroom space was leased out to the Catholic school board to house grade 6 students from neighboring École Laberge. Robert A. Jobber, which is architecturally identical to Centennial Park school, became École Gabrielle Roy. To maintain the Robert A. Jobber name, the gymnasium at Centennial Park was named in his honour.

== Media ==
The city's local newspaper is Le Soleil (The Sun). Châteauguay Express was shut down in 2014.

== Notable people ==
- IMA, a pop singer.
- Vanessa Gilles, soccer player for the Canada national team
- Rick Genest (August 7, 1985 – August 1, 2018), also known as Zombie Boy, fashion model and entertainer, famous for the corpse tattoos covering his body.
- Corey Crawford (born 31 December 1984 in Châteauguay) was a hockey goalie, who played for the Chicago Blackhawks.
- Kim St-Pierre, a goaltender for Team Canada's women hockey team, is a three-time gold medalist at the 2002, the 2006 Winter Olympics, and the 2010 Winter Olympics.
- Pierre Falardeau, creator of the Elvis Gratton series, is a Châteauguay native. The first 30 minutes of Elvis Gratton, Le King des Kings was filmed in Châteauguay.
- Award-winning cartoonist Chester Brown was raised in Châteauguay and attended Julius Richardson and Howard S. Billings schools. He was the creator of the SuperBee cartoons in the HSB yearbook.
- Veteran comic book artist Dale Eaglesham spent the first 26 years of his life in Châteauguay. He is currently illustrating Justice Society of America for DC Comics.
- Astrophysicist Hubert Reeves was born in the town west of Châteauguay, Léry.
- Annie Jack, (1839 – 1912), the first Canadian professional woman garden writer, lived and gardened in Châteauguay.
- Colin Mochrie, a comedian famous for his role on Whose Line is it Anyway?, lived in Chateauguay for five years as a child.
- Karla Homolka, serial killer who murdered three teenage girls with then-husband Paul Bernardo, lived in Chateauguay with her family for at least 2 years. Her children attended Centennial Park Elementary School.
- 2.0 Professional wrestling tag-team currently signed to All Elite Wrestling.

== Twin cities ==
- Cambrai, France
- Châteaugay, France
- Moose Jaw, Canada

== See also ==
- Châteauguay (provincial electoral district)
- Châteauguay—Lacolle
- List of anglophone communities in Quebec
- List of cities in Quebec
