= Dubois River =

River in Quebec (Canada)

- Native name: Rivière Dubois (French)

Location
- Country: Canada
- Province: Quebec
- Region: Chaudière-Appalaches, Centre-du-Québec
- MRC: Les Appalaches Regional County Municipality, L'Érable Regional County Municipality

Physical characteristics
- Source: Forest and mountain streams
  - location: Saint-Adrien-d'Irlande
  - coordinates: 46.12930°N 71.50316°W
  - elevation: 432 m (1,417 ft)
- Mouth: Bécancour River
  - location: Saint-Ferdinand
  - coordinates: 46.10444°N 71.55°W
  - elevation: 193 m (633 ft)
- Length: 6.7 km (4.2 mi)

Basin features
- Progression: Bécancour River, St. Lawrence River
- Tributaries
  - left: (upstream)
  - right: (upstream)

The Dubois River (designated "Chainey River" until 2006) is a tributary of the Bécancour River which is a tributary of the south shore of the St. Lawrence River.

The Dubois River flows through the municipalities of Saint-Adrien-d'Irlande, Irlande, in the Les Appalaches Regional County Municipality (MRC), in the administrative region of Chaudière-Appalaches, and Saint-Ferdinand of the MRC of L'Érable Regional County Municipality (Centre-du-Québec), in Quebec, Canada.

== Geography ==
The main neighboring hydrographic slopes of the Dubois River are:

- north side: Carrier stream, Bullard stream, Bécancour River;
- east side: Bullard stream, Morency stream, Bagot River;
- south side: Bécancour River, Lac à la Truite, McLean stream;
- west side: Bécancour River.

The Dubois River has its source in the municipality of Saint-Adrien-d'Irlande, at 1.9 kilometres (1.2 mi) south of the hamlet "Clapham", at 1.1 kilometres (0.68 mi) south-east of route 216 and at 0.3 kilometres (0.19 mi) from the limit of the municipality of Saint-Jean-de-Brébeuf.

From its head area, the Dubois River flows over 6.7 kilometres (4.2 mi) divided into the following segments:

- 1.8 kilometres (1.1 mi) southwesterly, to the municipal boundary between Saint-Adrien-d'Irlande, Irlande;
- 1.1 kilometres (0.68 mi) southwesterly, to the route 216 bridge;
- 3.1 kilometres (1.9 mi) southwesterly, up to the municipal boundary between Irlande and Saint-Ferdinand;
- 0.7 kilometres (0.43 mi) southwesterly, crossing route 165, to its confluence.

The Dubois River flows onto the east shore of William Lake, which is crossed to the north by the Bécancour River. This confluence is located opposite the village of Bernierville and 0.5 kilometres (0.31 mi) from the confluence of the Bécancour River whose current enters from the south of Lake William.

== Toponymy ==
The toponym "rivière Dubois" was made official on June 12, 2006, at the Commission de toponymie du Québec.

== See also ==
- List of rivers of Quebec
