= Bagot River =

River in Chaudière-Appalaches, Quebec (Canada)

- Native name: Rivière Bagot (French)

Location
- Country: Canada
- Province: Quebec
- Region: Chaudière-Appalaches
- MRC: Les Appalaches Regional County Municipality

Physical characteristics
- Source: Forest and mountain streams
  - location: Saint-Adrien-d'Irlande
  - coordinates: 46.111994°N 71.427571°W
  - elevation: 543 m (1,781 ft)
- Mouth: Bécancour River
  - location: Irlande
  - coordinates: 46.07444°N 71.48138°W
  - elevation: 194 m (636 ft)
- Length: 9.5 km (5.9 mi)

Basin features
- Progression: Bécancour River, St. Lawrence River
- Tributaries
  - left: (upstream) Ruisseau Grégoire
  - right: (upstream)

The Bagot River (in French: rivière Bagot) is a tributary of the Bécancour River which is a tributary of the south shore of the St. Lawrence River.

The Bagot River flows in the municipalities of Saint-Adrien-d'Irlande and Irlande, in the Les Appalaches Regional County Municipality (MRC), in the administrative region of Chaudière-Appalaches, in Quebec, in Canada.

== Geography ==
The main neighboring watersheds of the Bagot River are:

- north side: Ecrevisses stream, Morency stream, Bullard stream, Dubois River;
- east side: Bullard stream, Old Mill stream, Prévost stream, Blanche River (Thetford Mines), Bécancour River;
- south side: Bécancour River, Grégoire stream, Salaberry stream;
- west side: Bécancour River, Lac à la Truite, Étang Stater.

The Bagot River has its source in the municipality of Saint-Adrien-d'Irlande, on the north-western slope of Mont Saint-Adrien, at 3.0 kilometres (1.9 mi) east of the center from the village of Saint-Adrien-d'Irlande, at 8.0 kilometres (5.0 mi) north of the center of the village of Black Lake (a borough of the town of Thetford Mines) and 7.5 kilometres (4.7 mi) west of downtown Thetford Mines.

From its head area, the Bagot River flows over 9.5 kilometres (5.9 mi) divided into the following segments:

- 3.6 kilometres (2.2 mi) southwest, to the seventh rang road bridge;
- 0.8 kilometres (0.50 mi) southward, up to the municipal boundary between Saint-Adrien-d'Irlande, Irlande;
- 5.1 kilometres (3.2 mi) southwesterly, crossing under the route 265 bridge, to its confluence.

The Bagot River empties on the east bank of the Bécancour River. This confluence is located between Étang Stater and Lac à la Truite, to the south-east of the village of Bernierville and to the north-west of the hamlet of "Cranberry".

== Toponymy ==
The toponym Rivière Bagot was formalized on October 6, 1983, at the Commission de toponymie du Québec.

== See also ==
- List of rivers of Quebec
