= William Lake =

William Lake may refer to:

== People ==
- William A. Lake (1808–1861), U.S. Representative from Mississippi
- William Lake (Dean of Durham) (1817–1895), English cleric and college head
- William Lake (Dean of Antigua) (1947–2003)
- Bill Lake, Canadian actor
- Anthony Lake (William Anthony Kirsopp Lake, born 1939), U.S. government official

== Places ==
- William Lake (Québec), a lake on the Bécancour River in Centre-du-Québec, Quebec, Canada
- William Lake Provincial Park, provincial park in Manitoba
