= Fortier River (Bécancour River tributary) =

River in Centre-du-Québec, Quebec (Canada)

- Native name: Rivière Fortier (French)

Location
- Country: Canada
- Province: Quebec
- Region: Centre-du-Québec
- MRC: L'Érable Regional County Municipality

Physical characteristics
- Source: Forest and Mountain streams
  - location: Vianney
  - coordinates: 46.072568°N 71.59591°W
  - elevation: 430 m (1,410 ft)
- Mouth: Bécancour River (via William Lake)
  - location: Saint-Ferdinand
  - coordinates: 46.13583°N 71.58278°W
  - elevation: 193 m (633 ft)
- Length: 8.8 km (5.5 mi)

Basin features
- Progression: Bécancour River, St. Lawrence River
- Tributaries
  - left: (upstream) Ruisseau Larose, décharge du lac Tanguay
  - right: (upstream)

The Fortier River (in French: rivière Fortier) is a tributary of the Bécancour River (via William Lake. It flows in the municipalities of Vianney and Saint-Ferdinand, in the L'Érable Regional County Municipality (MRC), in the administrative region of Centre-du-Québec, in Quebec, in Canada.

== Geography ==
The main neighboring watersheds of the Fortier river are:

- north side: Bécancour River, ruisseau Pinette;
- east side: Bécancour River;
- south side: ruisseau Gardner;
- west side: ruisseau Larose, ruisseau Pinette.

The Fortier River has its source in the mountains, at 1.3 kilometres (0.81 mi) at south-west of a summit (elevation: 506 metres (1,660 ft), at 3.6 kilometres (2.2 mi) west of hamlet "Le Cent-Ans" and 4.1 kilometres (2.5 mi) south of William Lake.

From its source, the Fortier river flows over 8.8 kilometres (5.5 mi) generally North, with a drop of 237 metres (778 ft), divided into the following segments:

- 3.1 kilometres (1.9 mi) towards north, crossing "Route de Vianney", descending the mountain, to the fifth rang road;
- 5.7 kilometres (3.5 mi) north, crossing the sixth rang road, collecting the water of the discharge of lake Tanguay (coming from west), collecting water from ruisseau Larose and crossing route 165 in the hamlet Woodside, up to the mouth.

The Fortier river empties on the south-est bank of the Bécancour River (via William Lake) at the end of a peninsula which located north of Langlois Bay. This confluence is located 3.3 km north-west of the downtown of Saint-Ferdinand.

== Toponymy ==
The term "Fortier" turns out to be a family name of French origin.

The toponym "rivière Fortier" was made official on August 17, 1978, at the Commission de toponymie du Québec.

== See also ==
- List of rivers of Quebec
