= Val Barrette, Quebec =

Coordinates: 46.509013°N 75.353953°W

Val Barrette is an unincorporated community in Quebec, Canada. It is recognized as a designated place by Statistics Canada.

== Demographics ==
In the 2021 Census of Population conducted by Statistics Canada, Val Barrette had a population of 619 living in 307 of its 365 total private dwellings, a change of 3.3% from its 2016 population of 599. With a land area of 4.79 km^{2} (1.85 sq mi), it had a population density of 129.2/km^{2} (334.7/sq mi) in 2021.

== See also ==
- List of communities in Quebec
- List of designated places in Quebec
