= Saint-Charles-des-Grondines, Quebec =

Coordinates: 46.593110°N 72.034432°W

Saint-Charles-des-Grondines is an unincorporated community in Deschambault-Grondines, Quebec, Canada. It is recognized as a designated place by Statistics Canada.

== Demographics ==
In the 2021 Census of Population conducted by Statistics Canada, Saint-Charles-des-Grondines had a population of 475 living in 223 of its 244 total private dwellings, a change of 1.9% from its 2016 population of 466. With a land area of 7.07 km^{2} (2.73 sq mi), it had a population density of 67.2/km^{2} (174.0/sq mi) in 2021.

== See also ==
- List of communities in Quebec
- List of designated places in Quebec
