= L'Isle-aux-Coudres =

- Municipality
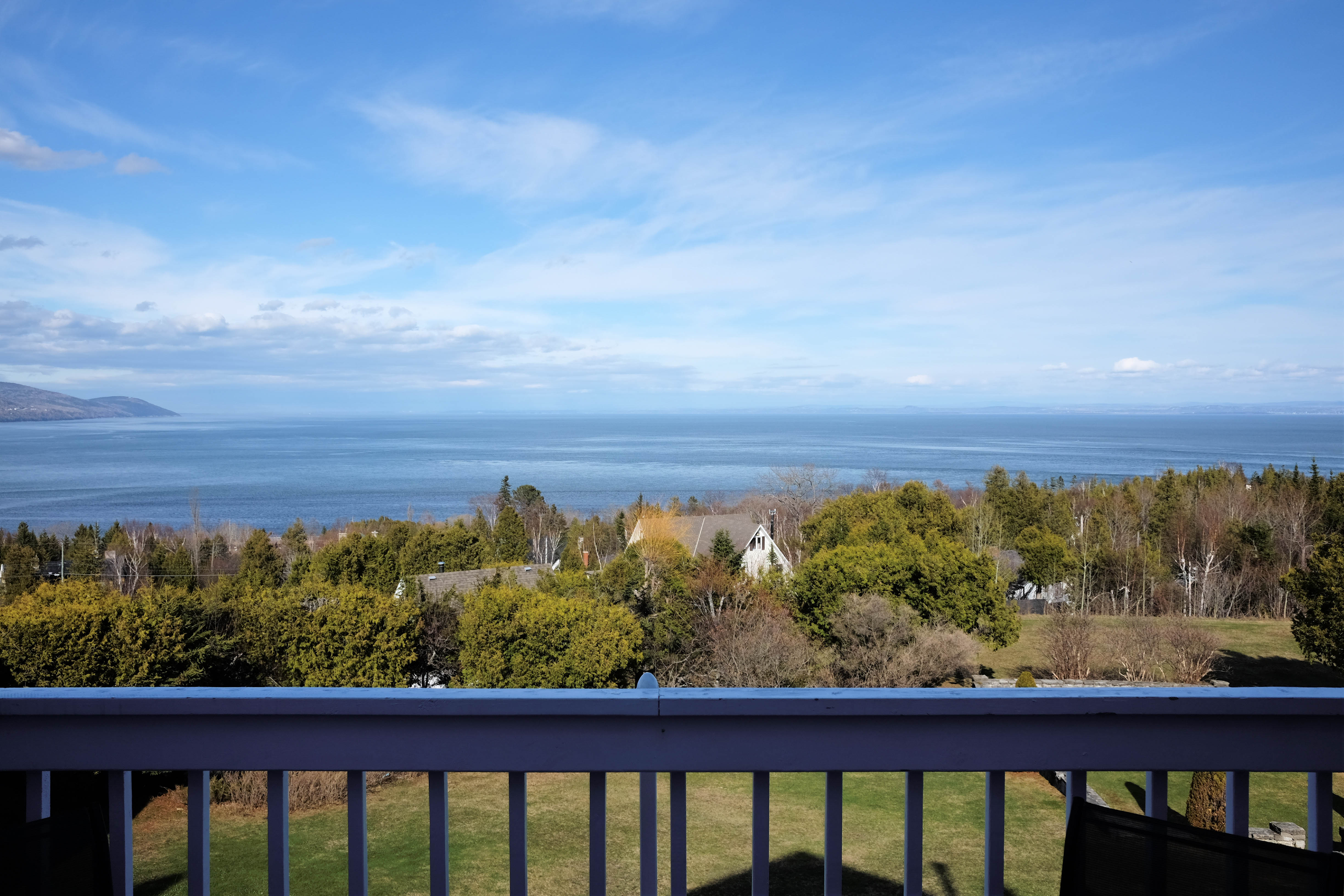

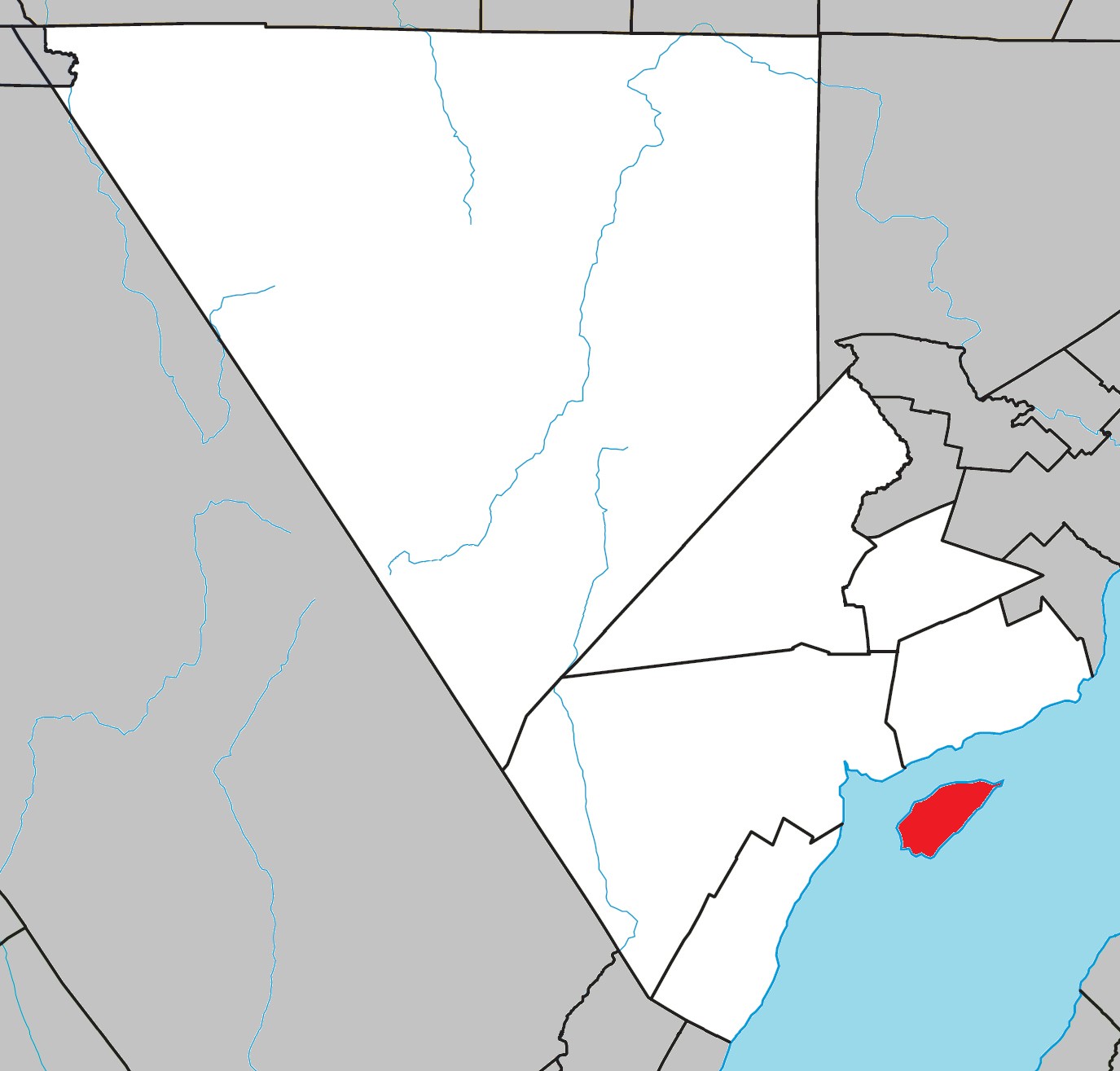
- Location within Charlevoix RCM

- Location in central Quebec
- Coordinates: 47°24′N 70°23′W
- Country: Canada
- Province: Quebec
- Region: Capitale-Nationale
- RCM: Charlevoix
- Settled: 1728
- Constituted: August 23, 2000

Government
  - Mayor: Christyan Dufour
  - Federal riding: Montmorency—Charlevoix
  - Prov. riding: Charlevoix–Côte-de-Beaupré

Area
  - Total: 100.96 km^{2} (38.98 sq mi)
  - Land: 29.46 km^{2} (11.37 sq mi)

Population (2021)
  - Total: 1,116
  - Density: 37.9/km^{2} (98/sq mi)
  - Pop (2016-21): ▼2.4%
  - Dwellings: 760
- Time zone: UTC−5 (EST)
  - Summer (DST): UTC−4 (EDT)
- Postal code(s): G0A 1X0
- Area codes: 418 and 581
- Highways: No major routes
- Website: www.municipaliteiac.ca

L'Isle-aux-Coudres (French pronunciation: [lil o kudʁ]), is a municipality located on island aux Coudres, in the St. Lawrence River, in Charlevoix Regional County Municipality, Capitale-Nationale region, Quebec, Canada.

Variations of the official name are: La Baleine, L'Île-aux-Coudres, Saint-Bernard-de-l'Île-aux-Coudres and Saint-Louis-de-l'Isle-aux-Coudres. Locally, the following variants are also noted: Île aux Coudriers, Île Elbow, Île aux Marsouins and Île aux Socles.

Whereas the modern French spelling for "island" is île, the municipality uses the old French spelling of Isle. Its population centres include La Baleine in the northeast, (Saint-Louis-de-)l'Isle-aux-Coudres in the south, and Saint-Bernard-sur-Mer in the northwest facing Baie-Saint-Paul.

Access to the island are by sea (ferry) and air (airport). The free ferry service connects Saint-Bernard-sur-Mer to Saint-Joseph-de-la-Rive on the north shore of the gulf.

It was the setting for the classic 1963 National Film Board of Canada documentary Pour la suite du monde.

== History ==
On September 6, 1535, during his second voyage to North America, the navigator Jacques Cartier named the island "couldres", after a hazel tree (Corylus cornuta), a shrub abundant in the area. In 1928, the Historic Sites and Monuments Board of Canada erected a monument commemorating the anchorage of Cartier's 3 ships and the celebration of the first mass in the interior of Canada, at Saint-Bernard-sur-Mer.

Étienne de Lessart of Ste. Anne-de-Beaupré was granted title as the first Seigneur of l'Isle-aux-Coudres by Governor Buade de Frontenac on March 4, 1677. Due to a failure to develop the property to increase its value he was forced to sell the seigneurie on October 19, 1687, to the Séminaire de Québec who began to establish a monastery on the site.

On October 29, 1687, Governor Denonville and Intendant Champigny granted the island as a seignory to the Seminary of Quebec, an act that was ratified on March 1, 1688.

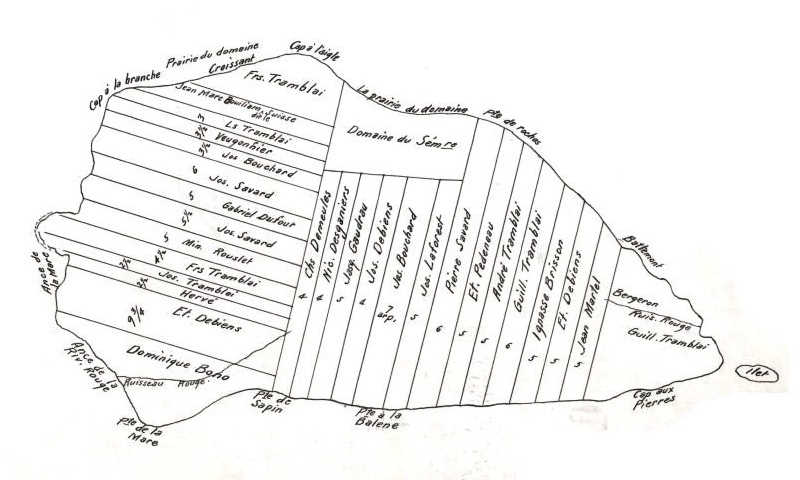
Plan of the island in 1751

In 1728, the first concessions of land were granted to settlers, and by 1741, the Parish of Saint-Louis-de-France was formed, soon after renamed to Saint-Louis-de-l'Isle-aux-Coudres. Named after Louis IX of France, it probably was also a tribute to Louis Chaumont (or Chaumonot) de La Jaunière (ca. 1700–1776), priest of Baie-Saint-Paul from 1736 to 1767. In 1845, the Parish Municipality of Saint-Louis-de-l'Isle-aux-Coudres was formed. In 1847, it was abolished, but reestablished in 1855, and would remain the only municipality covering the entire island for the next 80 years.

The community of Saint-Bernard-sur-Mer, first known as Pointe-des-Roches until 1936, only really developed from 1902 onward. The Parish of Saint-Bernard, named in honour of Bernard of Clairvaux (ca. 1090–1153), was officially founded in 1934 when it separated from the Parish of Saint-Louis, and was incorporated as the Municipality of Saint-Bernard-de-l'Île-aux-Coudres in 1936.

In 1951, the Municipality of La Baleine was incorporated, when it separated from Saint-Louis-de-l'Isle-aux-Coudres. It was named after an incident that had occurred in the late 18th century when the islanders found a carcass of a dead whale (in French: baleine) that had stranded on the island's flats. At this point, the island was divided into three municipal entities. '

On January 5, 1994, the Municipality of Saint-Bernard-de-l'Île-aux-Coudres and the Parish Municipality of Saint-Louis-de-l'Isle-aux-Coudres were merged and formed the Municipality of L'Île-aux-Coudres (new spelling). On August 23, 2000, this municipality and the Municipality of La Baleine were merged again to form the new Municipality of L'Isle-aux-Coudres (old spelling).

== Geography ==
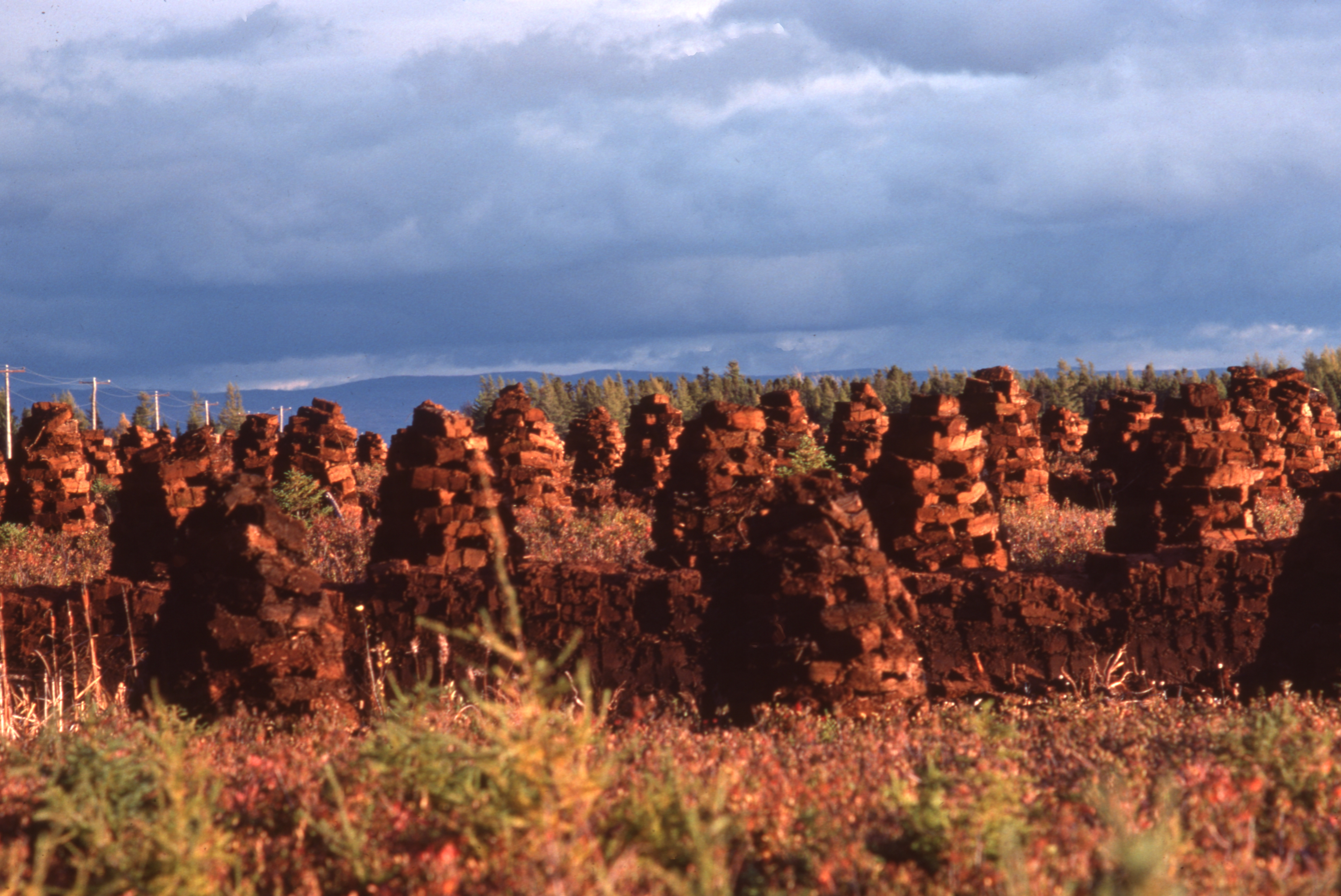
Peat bog and peat to dry

The island is about 11 kilometres (6.8 mi) long and averages 3 kilometres (1.9 mi) in width. It is thought to have been formed from material lifted up by the impact of the meteor which formed the Charlevoix region. Local streams include the Rouge River and Mare Creek.

== Demographics ==
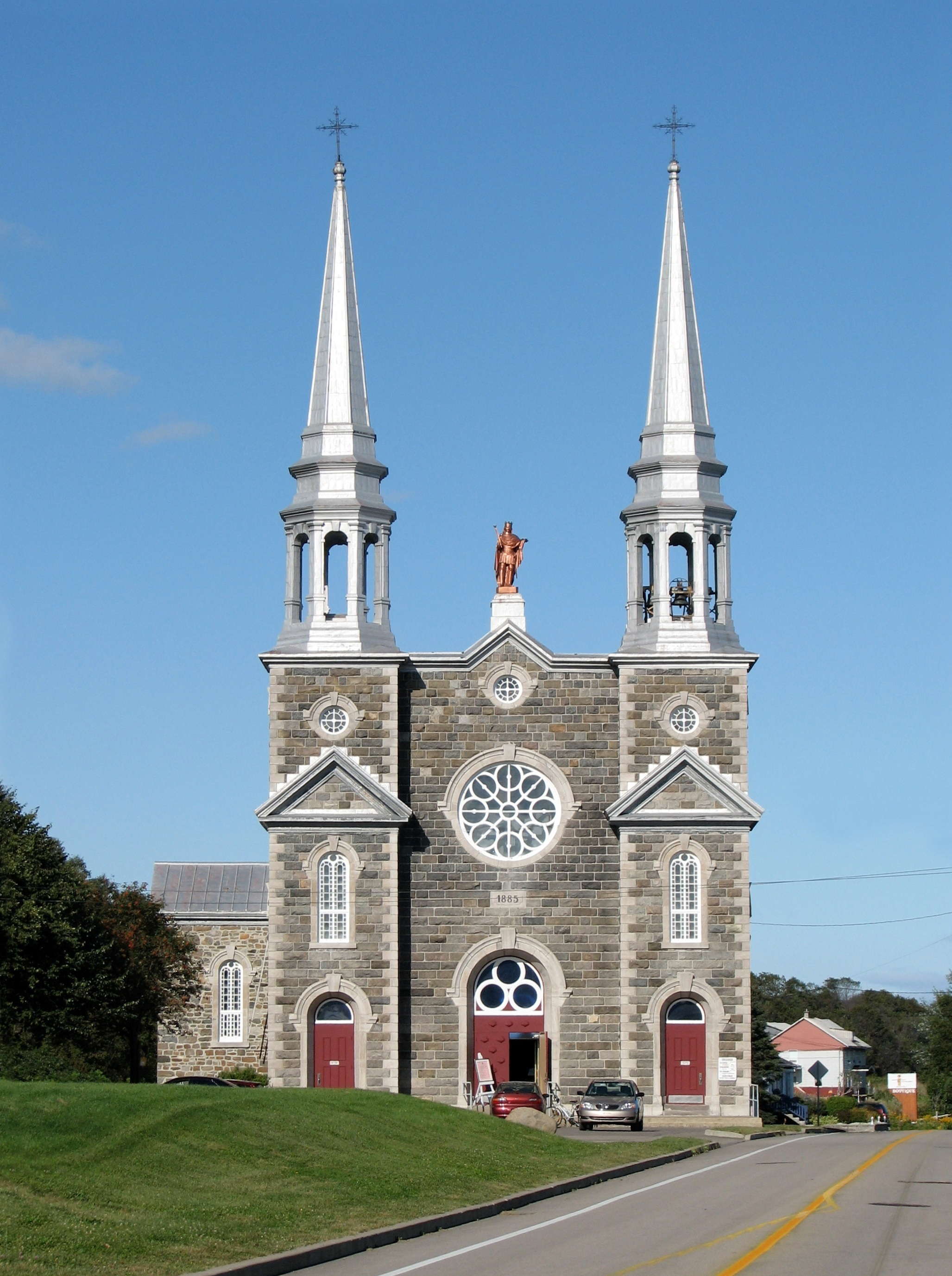
Catholic Church, Saint-François-d'Assise Parish, chemin des Coudriers

Historical census populations – L'Isle-aux-Coudres

Year	Pop.	±%
1921	1,114	—
1931	1,208	+8.4%
1941	1,409	+16.6%
1951	1,676	+18.9%
1956	1,699	+1.4%
1961	1,691	−0.5%

Year	Pop.	±%
1966	1,670	−1.2%
1971	1,522	−8.9%
1976	1,496	−1.7%
1981	1,492	−0.3%
1986	1,443	−3.3%
1991	1,383	−4.2%

Year	Pop.	±%
1996	1,345	−2.7%
2001	1,319	−1.9%
2006	1,296	−1.7%
2011	1,279	−1.3%
2016	1,143	−10.6%
2021	1,116	−2.4%

Population amount prior to 2000 are total of L'Île-aux-Coudres and La Baleine. Population amounts prior to 1994 are total of Saint-Louis-de-l'Isle-aux-Coudres (parish), Saint-Bernard-de-l'Île-aux-Coudres (municipality), and La Baleine.
Source: Statistics Canada

Private dwellings occupied by usual residents (2021): 583 (total dwellings: 760)

Mother tongue (2021):

- French as first language: 98.2%
- English as first language: 0.5%
- English and French as first language: 0.5%
- Other as first language: 0.5%

== Economy ==
Formerly, porpoise fishing was practiced on a broad basis, supplemented by some boat construction. Today tourism is the main industry, and the place is known for its historical sites, tourist accommodations, and craftspeople. On the beach near the ferry dock, there is a shipyard that is home to craftsmen who work according to ancestral techniques. The island is also a popular destination for cyclists.

== Local government ==
List of former mayors (since formation of current municipality):

- Jean-Claude Perron (2000)
- Gilbert Leclerc (2000)
- Dominique Tremblay (2000–2021)
- Christyan Dufour (2021–present)

== Image gallery ==
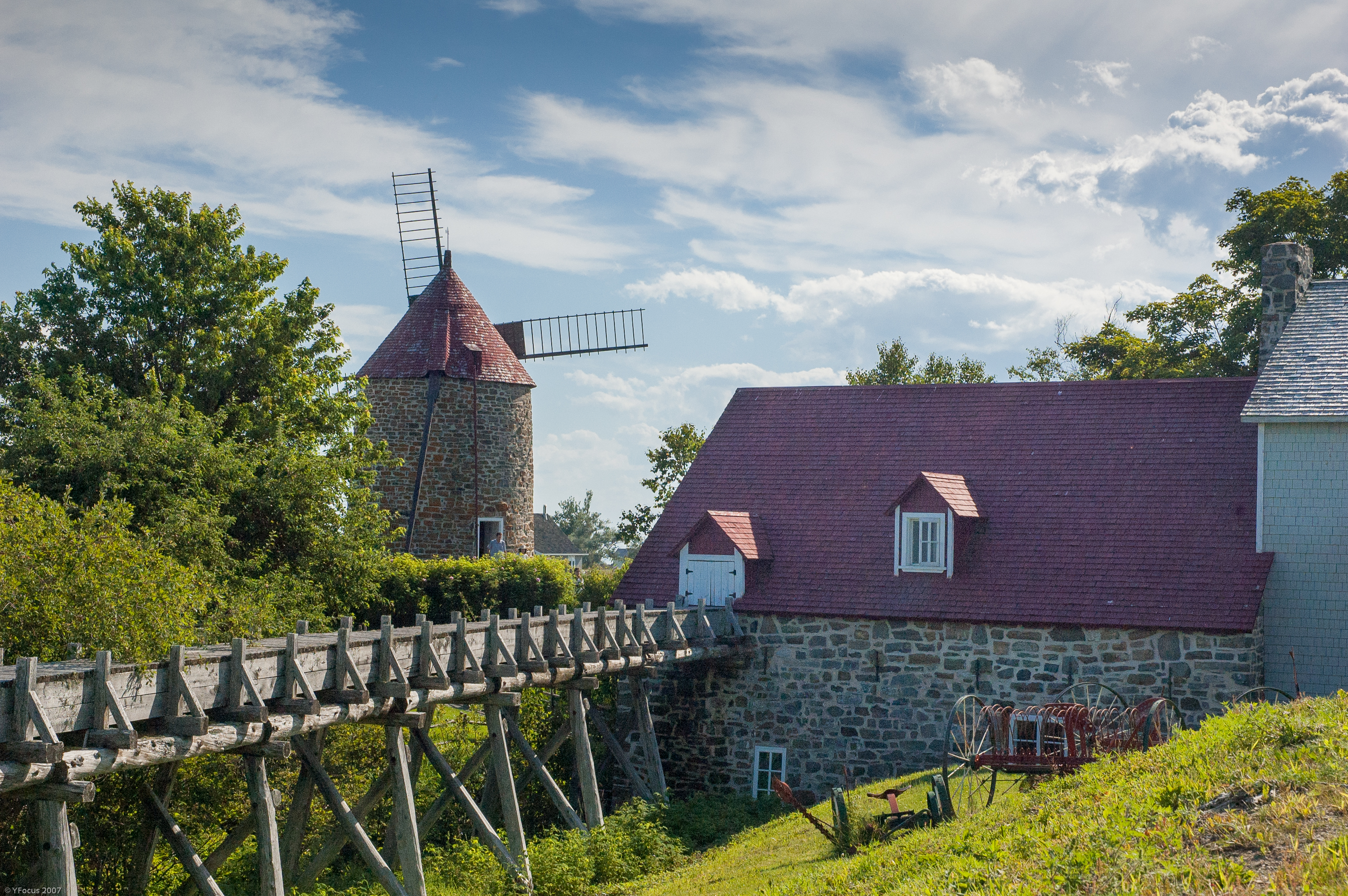
Wind and water mill heritage site

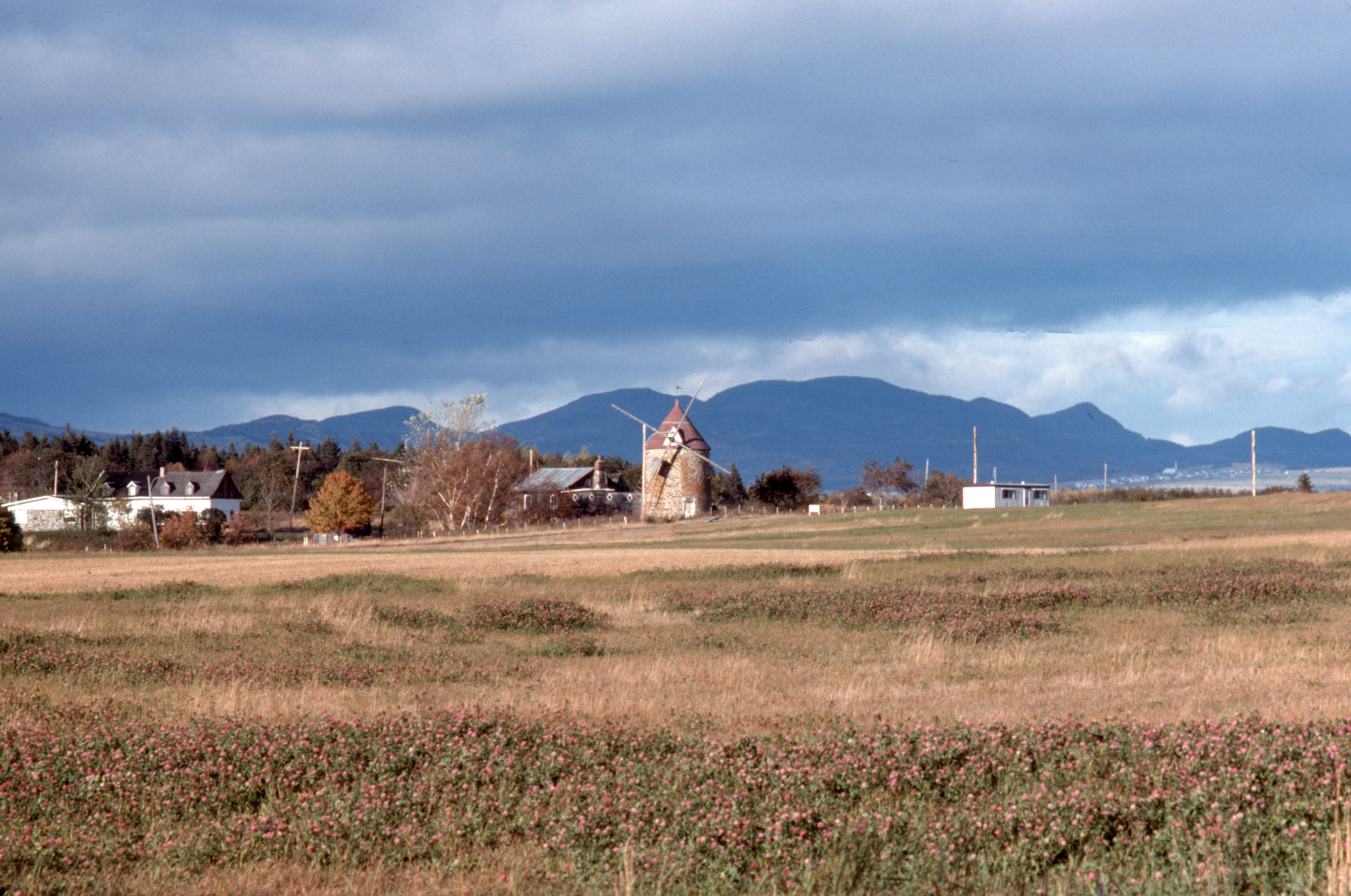
Old Desgagné-de-L'Isle-aux-Coudres windmill, 247 chemin du Moulin

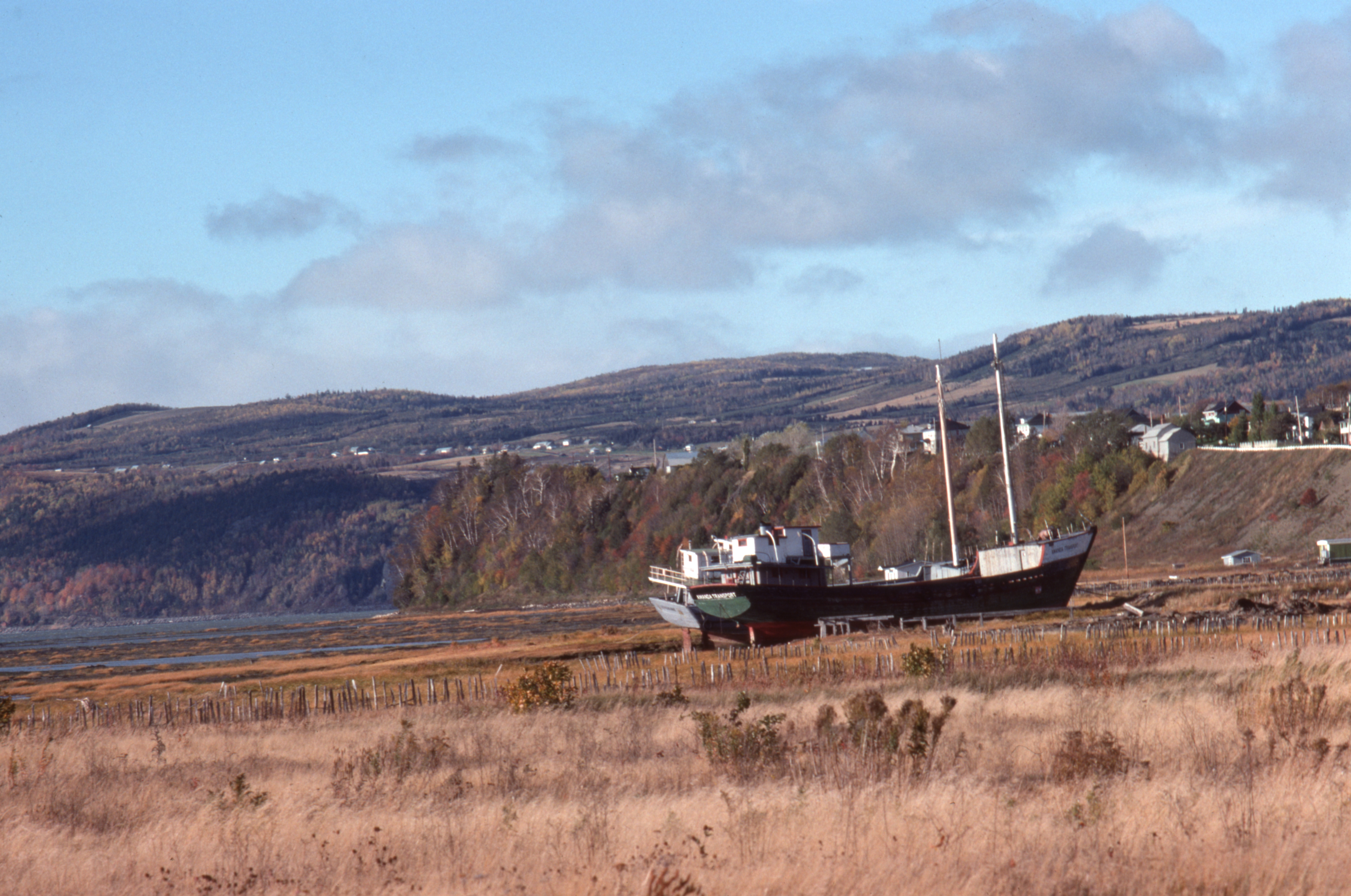
St. Lawrence schooner, in a field

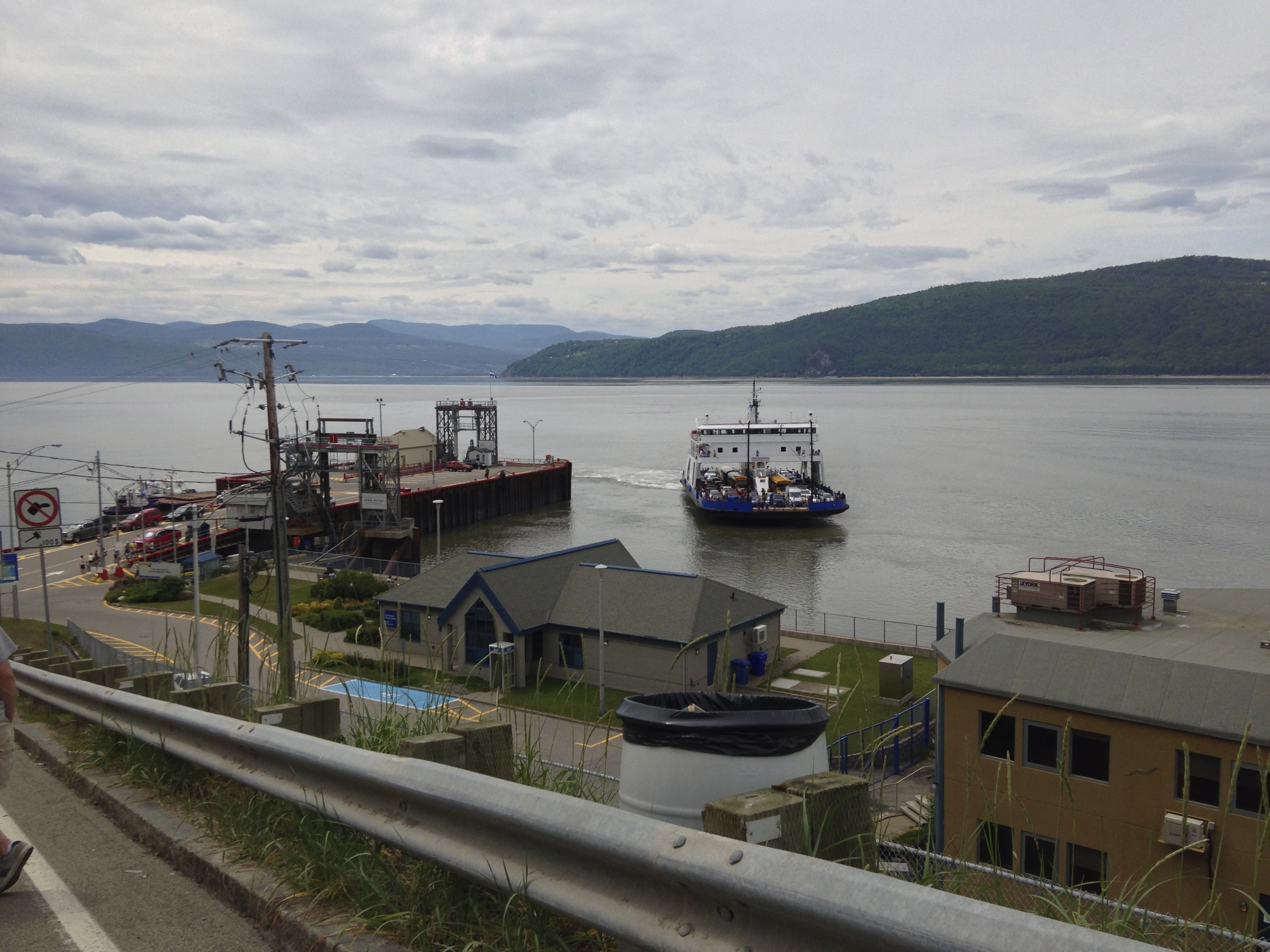
Ferries at the river station dock, Saint-Bernard-sur-Mer

== See also ==
- Société des traversiers du Québec
