= Shenley, Quebec =

Coordinates: 45.960483°N 70.831494°W

Shenley is an unincorporated community in Quebec, Canada. It is recognized as a designated place by Statistics Canada.

== Demographics ==
In the 2021 Census of Population conducted by Statistics Canada, Shenley had a population of 958 living in 409 of its 428 total private dwellings, a change of 4.6% from its 2016 population of 916. With a land area of 8.88 km^{2} (3.43 sq mi), it had a population density of 107.9/km^{2} (279.4/sq mi) in 2021.

== See also ==
- List of communities in Quebec
- List of designated places in Quebec
