= Grandes-Bergeronnes, Quebec =

Coordinates: 48.243479°N 69.545185°W

Grandes-Bergeronnes is an unincorporated community in Les Bergeronnes, Quebec, Canada. It is recognized as a designated place by Statistics Canada.

== Demographics ==
In the 2021 Census of Population conducted by Statistics Canada, Grandes-Bergeronnes had a population of 453 living in 209 of its 228 total private dwellings, a change of -7.9% from its 2016 population of 492. With a land area of 4.82 km^{2} (1.86 sq mi), it had a population density of 94.0/km^{2} (243.4/sq mi) in 2021.

== See also ==
- List of communities in Quebec
- List of designated places in Quebec
- List of former municipalities in Quebec
