= Sainte-Agathe, Quebec =

Sainte-Agathe, Quebec may refer to:

- Sainte-Agathe-des-Monts, in the Laurentides region of Quebec
- Sainte-Agathe-de-Lotbinière, Quebec, in the Chaudière-Appalaches region, formed from the 1999 amalgamation of the village and parish named Sainte-Agathe
- Sainte-Agathe, Quebec (designated place), former village now part of Sainte-Agathe-de-Lotbinière
