= Sainte-Monique, Quebec (designated place) =

Coordinates: 46.157581°N 72.537293°W

Sainte-Monique is an unincorporated community in Quebec, Canada. It is recognized as a designated place by Statistics Canada.

== Demographics ==
In the 2021 Census of Population conducted by Statistics Canada, Sainte-Monique had a population of 194 living in 78 of its 81 total private dwellings, a change of -3% from its 2016 population of 200. With a land area of 0.75 km^{2} (0.29 sq mi), it had a population density of 258.7/km^{2} (669.9/sq mi) in 2021.

== See also ==
- List of communities in Quebec
- List of designated places in Quebec
