= La Baleine, Quebec =

Coordinates: 47.402398°N 70.351118°W

La Baleine is an unincorporated community in L'Isle-aux-Coudres, Quebec, Canada. It is recognized as a designated place by Statistics Canada.

== Demographics ==
In the 2021 Census of Population conducted by Statistics Canada, La Baleine had a population of 233 living in 126 of its 175 total private dwellings, a change of 0.4% from its 2016 population of 232. With a land area of 10.52 km^{2} (4.06 sq mi), it had a population density of 22.1/km^{2} (57.4/sq mi) in 2021.

== See also ==
- List of communities in Quebec
- List of designated places in Quebec
