= Coleraine, Quebec =

Coordinates: 45.966991°N 71.372400°W

Coleraine is an unincorporated community in Saint-Joseph-de-Coleraine, Quebec, Canada. It is recognized as a designated place by Statistics Canada.

== Demographics ==
In the 2021 Census of Population conducted by Statistics Canada, Coleraine had a population of 1,067 living in 498 of its 523 total private dwellings, a change of 2.3% from its 2016 population of 1,043. With a land area of 4.17 km^{2} (1.61 sq mi), it had a population density of 255.9/km^{2} (662.7/sq mi) in 2021.

== See also ==
- List of communities in Quebec
- List of designated places in Quebec
