= Rock Island, Quebec =

Coordinates: 45.007661°N 72.098477°W

Rock Island is an unincorporated community in Stanstead, Quebec, Canada. It is recognized as a designated place by Statistics Canada.

== Demographics ==
In the 2021 Census of Population conducted by Statistics Canada, Rock Island had a population of 927 living in 416 of its 459 total private dwellings, a change of 3.3% from its 2016 population of 897. With a land area of 7.36 km^{2} (2.84 sq mi), it had a population density of 126.0/km^{2} (326.2/sq mi) in 2021.

== See also ==
- List of communities in Quebec
- List of designated places in Quebec
