= L'Île-d'Entrée, Quebec =

Coordinates: 47.272517°N 61.706782°W

L'Île-d'Entrée is an unincorporated community in Les Îles-de-la-Madeleine, Quebec, Canada. It is recognized as a designated place by Statistics Canada.

== Demographics ==
In the 2021 Census of Population conducted by Statistics Canada, L'Île-d'Entrée had a population of 74 living in 43 of its 61 total private dwellings, a change of -17.8% from its 2016 population of 90. With a land area of 3.98 km^{2} (1.54 sq mi), it had a population density of 18.6/km^{2} (48.2/sq mi) in 2021.

== See also ==
- List of communities in Quebec
- List of designated places in Quebec
