= Les Becquets, Quebec =

Coordinates: 46.503150°N 72.203467°W

Les Becquets is an unincorporated community in Saint-Pierre-les-Becquets, Quebec, Canada. It is recognized as a designated place by Statistics Canada.

== Demographics ==
In the 2021 Census of Population conducted by Statistics Canada, Les Becquets had a population of 451 living in 213 of its 231 total private dwellings, a change of -1.3% from its 2016 population of 457. With a land area of 3.03 km^{2} (1.17 sq mi), it had a population density of 148.8/km^{2} (385.5/sq mi) in 2021.

== See also ==
- List of communities in Quebec
- List of designated places in Quebec
