= Weedon Centre, Quebec =

Coordinates: 45.700005°N 71.461359°W

Weedon Centre is an unincorporated community in Quebec, Canada. It is recognized as a designated place by Statistics Canada.

== Demographics ==
In the 2021 Census of Population conducted by Statistics Canada, Weedon Centre had a population of 1,022 living in 509 of its 538 total private dwellings, a change of -3.5% from its 2016 population of 1,059. With a land area of 4.83 km^{2} (1.86 sq mi), it had a population density of 211.6/km^{2} (548.0/sq mi) in 2021.

== See also ==
- List of communities in Quebec
- List of designated places in Quebec
