= Philipsburg, Quebec =

Coordinates: 45.039150°N 73.074646°W

Philipsburg is an unincorporated community in Saint-Armand, Quebec, Canada, on Lake Champlain. It is recognized as a designated place by Statistics Canada.

The community was founded by Loyalists from New England and New York, who joined the "Loyalist exodus" to Canada after the British defeat in the American Revolutionary War. Premier of New Brunswick, William Pugsley, was a descendant of theirs.

== Demographics ==
In the 2021 Census of Population conducted by Statistics Canada, Philipsburg had a population of 292 living in 157 of its 179 total private dwellings, a change of 4.3% from its 2016 population of 280. With a land area of 1.76 km^{2} (0.68 sq mi), it had a population density of 165.9/km^{2} (429.7/sq mi) in 2021.

== See also ==
- List of communities in Quebec
- List of designated places in Quebec
