= Lac-Carré, Quebec =

Coordinates: 46.130567°N 74.473342°W

Lac-Carré is an unincorporated community in Mont-Blanc, Quebec, Canada. It is recognized as a designated place by Statistics Canada.

== Demographics ==
In the 2021 Census of Population conducted by Statistics Canada, Lac-Carré had a population of 1,031 living in 498 of its 583 total private dwellings, a change of 5.6% from its 2016 population of 976. With a land area of 1.79 km^{2} (0.69 sq mi), it had a population density of 576.0/km^{2} (1,491.8/sq mi) in 2021.

== See also ==
- List of communities in Quebec
- List of designated places in Quebec
