= De Grasse, Quebec =

Coordinates: 50.219260°N 66.215869°W

De Grasse is an unincorporated community in Sept-Îles, Quebec, Canada. It is recognized as a designated place by Statistics Canada.

== Demographics ==
In the 2021 Census of Population conducted by Statistics Canada, De Grasse had a population of 10 living in 5 of its 5 total private dwellings, up from its 2016 population of 0. With a land area of 1.38 km^{2} (0.53 sq mi), it had a population density of 7.2/km^{2} (18.8/sq mi) in 2021.

== See also ==
- List of communities in Quebec
- List of designated places in Quebec
