= Saint-Georges-de-Cacouna, Quebec =

Coordinates: 47.912017°N 69.503576°W

Saint-Georges-de-Cacouna is an unincorporated community in Cacouna, Quebec, Canada. It is recognized as a designated place by Statistics Canada.

== Demographics ==
In the 2021 Census of Population conducted by Statistics Canada, Saint-Georges-de-Cacouna had a population of 1,098 living in 523 of its 579 total private dwellings, a change of -0.1% from its 2016 population of 1,099. With a land area of 6.99 km^{2} (2.70 sq mi), it had a population density of 157.1/km^{2} (406.8/sq mi) in 2021.

== See also ==
- List of communities in Quebec
- List of designated places in Quebec
