= Amulet, Quebec =

Coordinates: 48.292058°N 79.027405°W

Amulet is an unincorporated community in Rouyn-Noranda, Quebec, Canada. It is recognized as a designated place by Statistics Canada.

== Demographics ==
In the 2021 Census of Population conducted by Statistics Canada, Amulet had a population of 1,350 living in 553 of its 573 total private dwellings, a change of 0.7% from its 2016 population of 1,340. With a land area of 1.86 km^{2} (0.72 sq mi), it had a population density of 725.8/km^{2} (1,879.8/sq mi) in 2021.

== See also ==
- List of communities in Quebec
- List of designated places in Quebec
