= Saint-Jean-de-Dieu (unconstituted locality) =

Coordinates: 48.003582°N 69.046295°W

Saint-Jean-de-Dieu is an unconstituted locality in Quebec, Canada within a larger municipality also named Saint-Jean-de-Dieu. It is recognized as a designated place by Statistics Canada.

== Demographics ==
In the 2021 Census of Population conducted by Statistics Canada, Saint-Jean-de-Dieu had a population of 1,027 living in 447 of its 471 total private dwellings, a change of 4.1% from its 2016 population of 987. With a land area of 3.35 km^{2} (1.29 sq mi), it had a population density of 306.6/km^{2} (794.0/sq mi) in 2021.

== See also ==
- List of communities in Quebec
- List of designated places in Quebec
