= Sainte-Félicité, Quebec (designated place) =

Coordinates: 48.899015°N 67.335059°W

Sainte-Félicité is an unincorporated community in Quebec, Canada. It is recognized as a designated place by Statistics Canada.

== Demographics ==
In the 2021 Census of Population conducted by Statistics Canada, Sainte-Félicité had a population of 552 living in 250 of its 266 total private dwellings, a change of -3.5% from its 2016 population of 572. With a land area of 1.82 km^{2} (0.70 sq mi), it had a population density of 303.3/km^{2} (785.5/sq mi) in 2021.

== See also ==
- List of communities in Quebec
- List of designated places in Quebec
