= Stanstead Plain, Quebec =

Stanstead Plain
- Unincorporated community
- Interactive map of Stanstead Plain
- Coordinates: 45.018679°N 72.091780°W
- Country: Canada
- Province: Quebec
- Region: Estrie

Area
  - Total: 6.72 km^{2} (2.59 sq mi)

Population (2021)
  - Total: 1,030
  - Density: 153.3/km^{2} (397/sq mi)

Stanstead Plain is an unincorporated community in Quebec, Canada. It is recognized as a designated place by Statistics Canada.

== Demographics ==
In the 2021 Census of Population conducted by Statistics Canada, Stanstead Plain had a population of 1,030 living in 459 of its 484 total private dwellings, a change of −0.7% from its 2016 population of 1,037. With a land area of 6.72 km^{2} (2.59 sq mi), it had a population density of 153.3/km^{2} (397.0/sq mi) in 2021.

== See also ==
- List of communities in Quebec
- List of designated places in Quebec
