= Saint-Bernard-de-l'Île-aux-Coudres, Quebec =

Coordinates: 47.420226°N 70.382664°W

Saint-Bernard-de-l'Île-aux-Coudres is an unincorporated community in L'Isle-aux-Coudres, Quebec, Canada. It is recognized as a designated place by Statistics Canada.

== Demographics ==
In the 2021 Census of Population conducted by Statistics Canada, Saint-Bernard-de-l'Île-aux-Coudres had a population of 541 living in 274 of its 349 total private dwellings, a change of −6.1% from its 2016 population of 576. With a land area of 7.82 km^{2} (3.02 sq mi), it had a population density of 69.2/km^{2} (179.2/sq mi) in 2021.

== See also ==
- List of communities in Quebec
- List of designated places in Quebec
