= La Pérade, Quebec =

Coordinates: 46.572005°N 72.204626°W

La Pérade is an unincorporated community in Sainte-Anne-de-la-Pérade, Quebec, Canada. It is recognized as a designated place by Statistics Canada.

== Demographics ==
In the 2021 Census of Population conducted by Statistics Canada, La Pérade had a population of 820 living in 388 of its 442 total private dwellings, a change of 0.1% from its 2016 population of 819. With a land area of 6.1 km^{2} (2.4 sq mi), it had a population density of 134.4/km^{2} (348.2/sq mi) in 2021.

== See also ==
- List of communities in Quebec
- List of designated places in Quebec
