= Andréville, Quebec =

Coordinates: 47.677600°N 69.724295°W

Andréville is a former municipality and an unincorporated community in Saint-André-de-Kamouraska, Quebec, Canada. It is recognized as a designated place by Statistics Canada.

== History ==
The municipality of Andréville was officially created on May 29, 1903 by separating from Saint-André. On February 11, 1987, Andréville and Saint-André merged together to form a new municipality also named Saint-André (now named Saint-André-de-Kamouraska).

== Demographics ==
In the 2021 Census of Population conducted by Statistics Canada, Andréville had a population of 269 living in 93 of its 99 total private dwellings, a change of 2.3% from its 2016 population of 263. With a land area of 4.24 km^{2} (1.64 sq mi), it had a population density of 63.4/km^{2} (164.3/sq mi) in 2021.

== See also ==
- List of communities in Quebec
- List of designated places in Quebec
- List of former municipalities in Quebec
