= Yamaska-Est, Quebec =

Coordinates: 46.005233°N 72.906134°W

Yamaska-Est is an unincorporated community in Quebec, Canada. It is recognized as a designated place by Statistics Canada.

== Demographics ==
In the 2021 Census of Population conducted by Statistics Canada, Yamaska-Est had a population of 268 living in 128 of its 134 total private dwellings, a change of 0.4% from its 2016 population of 267. With a land area of 0.41 km^{2} (0.16 sq mi), it had a population density of 653.7/km^{2} (1,693.0/sq mi) in 2021.

== See also ==
- List of communities in Quebec
- List of designated places in Quebec
