= Baie du Milieu, Quebec =

Coordinates: 51.465607°N 57.497590°W

Baie du Milieu (Middle Bay) is an unincorporated community in Bonne-Espérance, Quebec, Canada. It is recognized as a designated place by Statistics Canada.

== Demographics ==
In the 2021 Census of Population conducted by Statistics Canada, Baie du Milieu had a population of 15 living in 11 of its 12 total private dwellings, a change of -54.5% from its 2016 population of 33. With a land area of 9.61 km^{2} (3.71 sq mi), it had a population density of 1.6/km^{2} (4.0/sq mi) in 2021.

== See also ==
- List of communities in Quebec
- List of designated places in Quebec
