= Saint-Elzéar, Quebec =

Saint-Elzéar, Quebec may refer to:

- Saint-Elzéar, Gaspésie–Îles-de-la-Madeleine, in Bonaventure Regional County Municipality, Quebec
- Saint-Elzéar, Chaudière-Appalaches, Quebec, in La Nouvelle-Beauce Regional County Municipality
- Saint-Elzéar-de-Témiscouata, in Témiscouata Regional County Municipality, Quebec, formerly known simply as Saint-Elzéar
- Saint-Elzéar, Laval, Quebec
- Saint-Elzéar, Quebec (designated place), an unincorporated community in Saint-Elzéar, Chaudière-Appalaches, Quebec
