= Bernierville, Quebec =

Coordinates: 46.107644°N 71.571921°W

Bernierville is a former municipality and an unincorporated community in Saint-Ferdinand, Quebec, Canada. It is recognized as a designated place by Statistics Canada.

== History ==
The municipality of Bernierville was officially created on April 8, 1898 by separating from Halifax-Sud. On November 29, 2000, Bernierville was annexed by Saint-Ferdinand.

== Demographics ==
In the 2021 Census of Population conducted by Statistics Canada, Bernierville had a population of 977 living in 509 of its 609 total private dwellings, a change of -1.7% from its 2016 population of 994. With a land area of 1.99 km^{2} (0.77 sq mi), it had a population density of 491.0/km^{2} (1,271.6/sq mi) in 2021.

== See also ==
- List of communities in Quebec
- List of designated places in Quebec
- List of former municipalities in Quebec
