= Saint-Isidore, Quebec =

There are three municipalities named Saint-Isidore in Quebec:

- Saint-Isidore, Chaudière-Appalaches, Quebec, in La Nouvelle-Beauce Regional County Municipality
- Saint-Isidore, Montérégie, Quebec, in Roussillon Regional County Municipality
- Saint-Isidore-de-Clifton, in Le Haut-Saint-François Regional County Municipality
- Saint-Isidore, Quebec (designated place), a community in Saint-Isidore, Chaudière-Appalaches, Quebec
