= Bishopton, Quebec =

Coordinates: 45.583204°N 71.576126°W

Bishopton is a former municipality and an unincorporated community in Dudswell, Quebec, Canada. It is recognized as a designated place by Statistics Canada.

== History ==
The municipality of Bishop's Crossing was created on October 2, 1917 by separating from Dudswell. Fifteen years later, On November 24, 1932, the name was change to Bishopton. On October 11, 1995, Bishopton, Marbleton and Dudswell merged together to form a new municipality also named Dudswell.

== Demographics ==
In the 2021 Census of Population conducted by Statistics Canada, Bishopton had a population of 450 living in 186 of its 260 total private dwellings, a change of 2% from its 2016 population of 441. With a land area of 9.82 km^{2} (3.79 sq mi), it had a population density of 45.8/km^{2} (118.7/sq mi) in 2021.

== See also ==
- List of communities in Quebec
- List of designated places in Quebec
- List of former municipalities in Quebec
