= Saint-Isidore, Quebec (designated place) =

Coordinates: 46.583290°N 71.089862°W

Saint-Isidore is an unincorporated community in Quebec, Canada. It is recognized as a designated place by Statistics Canada.

== Demographics ==
In the 2021 Census of Population conducted by Statistics Canada, Saint-Isidore had a population of 1,333 living in 522 of its 535 total private dwellings, a change of 18.8% from its 2016 population of 1,122. With a land area of 7.44 km^{2} (2.87 sq mi), it had a population density of 179.2/km^{2} (464.0/sq mi) in 2021.

== See also ==
- List of communities in Quebec
- List of designated places in Quebec
