= Holy Trinity Anglican Church (Maple Grove, Quebec) =

Church in Quebec, Canada

Coordinates: 46.0837°N 71.530°W

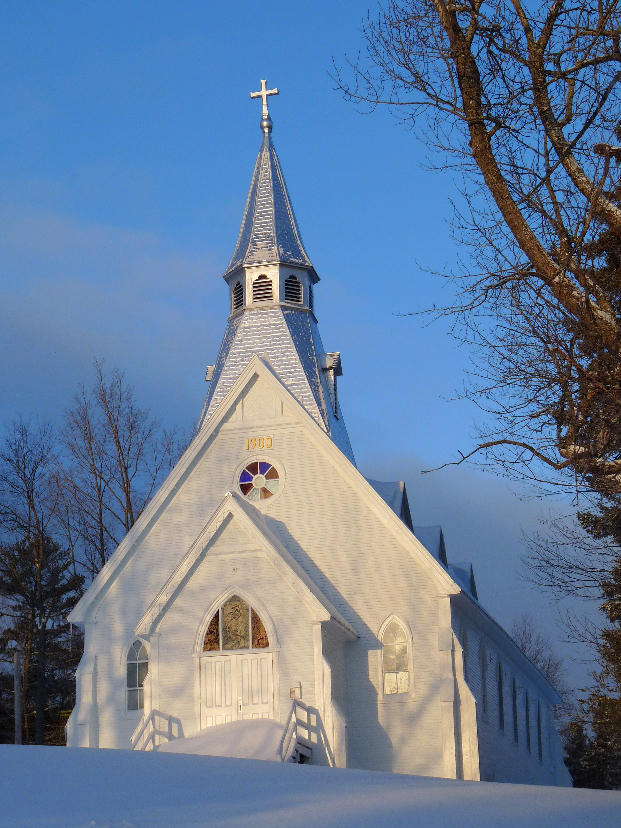
- Interactive map of the Holy Trinity Anglican Church area

General information
- Architectural style: Carpenter Gothic
- Location: Irlande, Quebec, near Thetford Mines, Canada
- Construction started: 1900
- Completed: 1902

Technical details
- Structural system: wooden, single storey with basement, steep roof,

Design and construction
- Architects: Louis Auguste Amos and Alfred Arthur Cox. Amos and Arthur, Montreal

Holy Trinity Anglican Church (French: Église Holy Trinity de Maple Grove) is a large historic Carpenter Gothic style Anglican church building located at 173 Gosford Road (173, chemin Gosford) in the village of Maple Grove in Irlande, Quebec, near Thetford Mines in the Eastern Townships of Quebec, Canada. It was designed by noted Montreal architects Louis Auguste Amos and Alfred Arthur Cox of the firm Amos and Arthur and was built of wood between 1902 and 1904 by local craftsmen Its steep pitched roof and lancet windows are typical of Carpenter Gothic churches. Adjacent to the church are its historic cemetery and its historic stone rectory (le presbytère). The cemetery is still active and is maintained by the Maple Grove Anglican Cemetery Foundation. The rectory is a bed and breakfast called Manoir d'Irlande. The church is no longer active, but is still consecrated and is opened several times a year for services including a reunion in August. In 2003, the Anglican Diocese of Montreal gave a 99-year lease on the church to the Maple Grove Heritage Foundation, which is in the process of doing restoration work. The first project completed has been the restoration of the stained glass windows.

Because of its architecture and its significance in the history of the area, it was designated a municipal heritage site by the municipality of Irlande on January 17, 2006.
