= Les Bergeronnes =

- Municipality
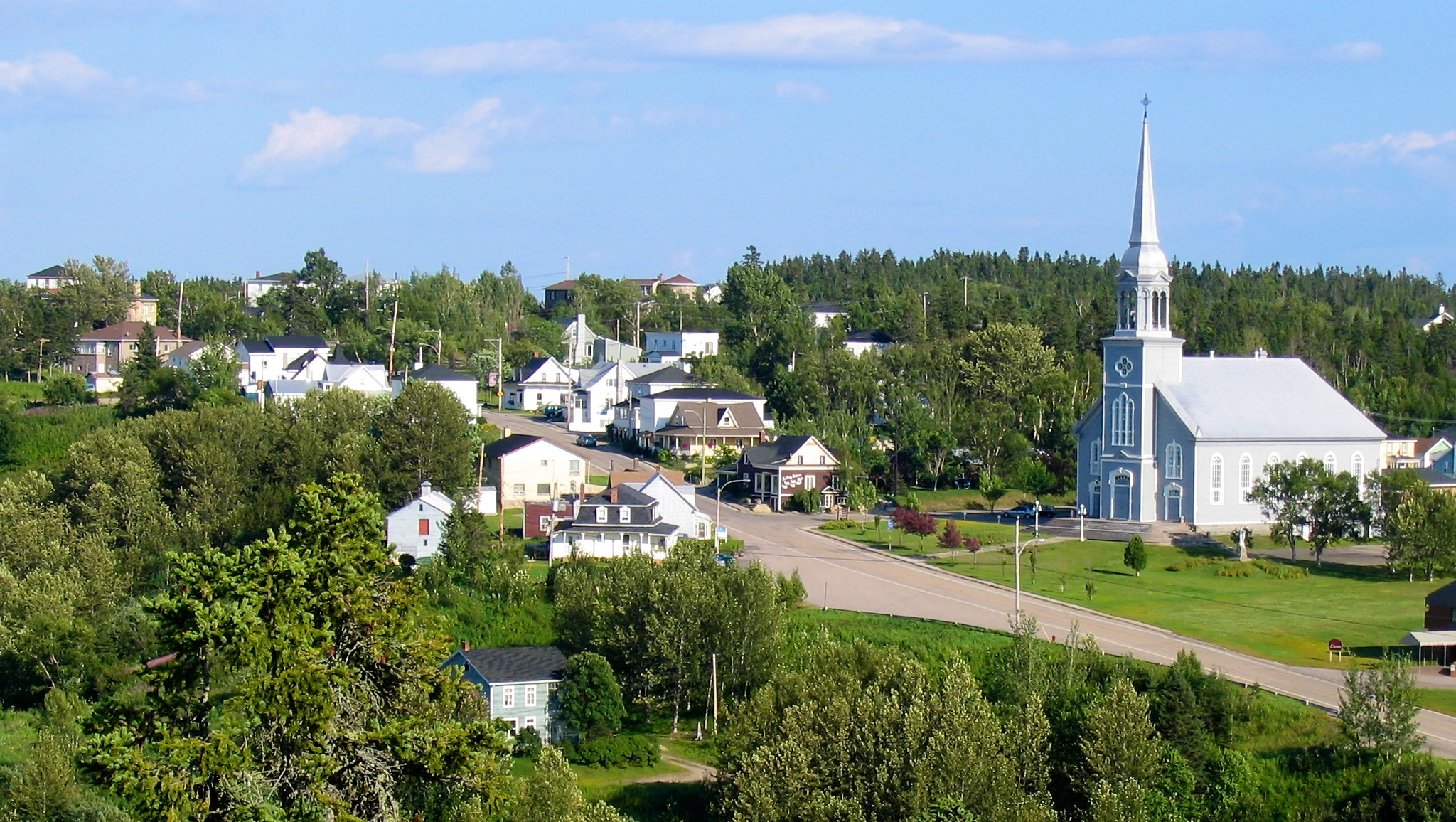
- Grandes-Bergeronnes

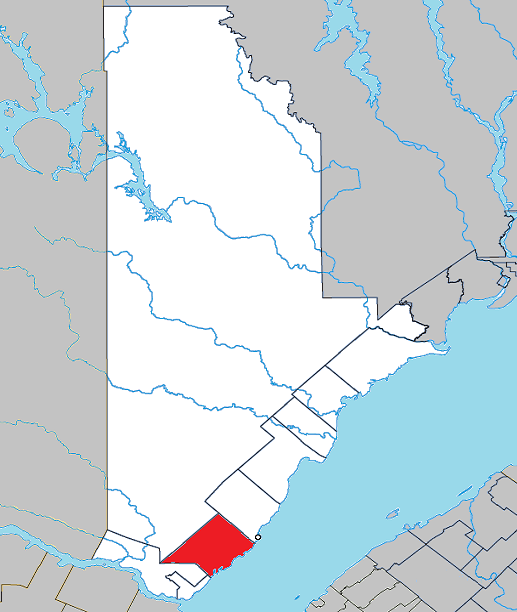
- Location within La Haute-Côte-Nord RCM

- Location in Côte-Nord region of Quebec
- Coordinates: 48°15′N 69°33′W
- Country: Canada
- Province: Quebec
- Region: Côte-Nord
- RCM: La Haute-Côte-Nord
- Settled: 1845
- Constituted: December 29, 1999

Government
  - Mayor: Nathalie Ross
  - Federal riding: Côte-Nord—Kawawachikamach—Nitassinan
  - Prov. riding: René-Lévesque

Area
  - Total: 289.16 km^{2} (111.65 sq mi)
  - Land: 268.77 km^{2} (103.77 sq mi)

Population (2021)
  - Total: 619
  - Density: 2.3/km^{2} (6.0/sq mi)
  - Pop (2016-21): ▼6.4%
  - Dwellings: 319
- Time zone: UTC−05:00 (EST)
  - Summer (DST): UTC−04:00 (EDT)
- Postal code(s): G0T 1G0
- Area codes: 418 and 581
- Highways: R-138
- Website: bergeronnes.com

Les Bergeronnes (French pronunciation: [le bɛʁʒəʁɔn]) is a municipality in the Côte-Nord region of the province of Quebec in Canada. The municipality includes the communities of Grandes-Bergeronnes, Petites-Bergeronnes and Bon-Désir.

== History ==
=== The Bon-Désir trading post ===
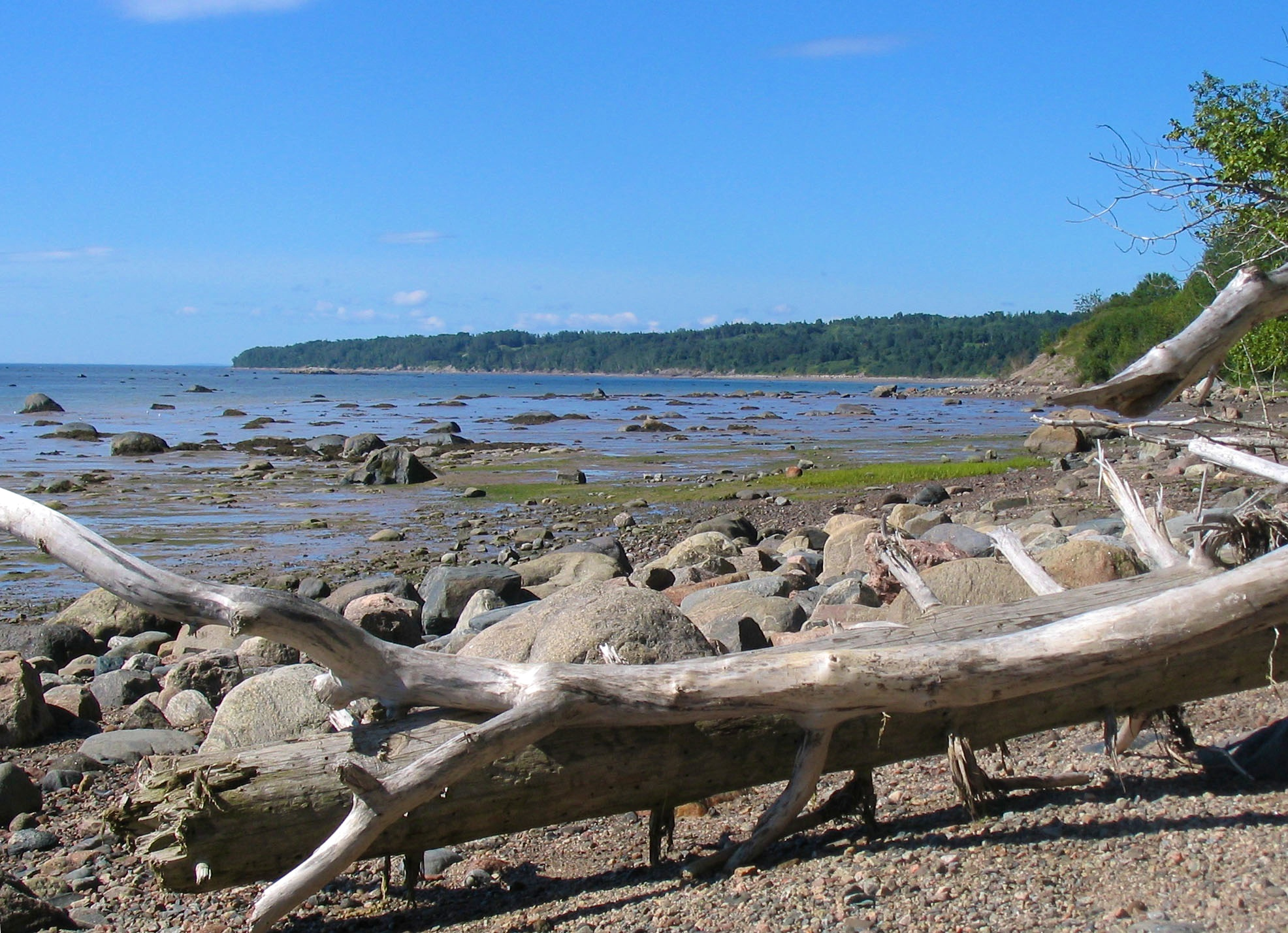
Bay of Bon Desir

After the continental glacier withdrawal 8,000 years ago, Indigenous Canadians spent the summer along the Saint Lawrence River bank in the Bergeronnes territory. Archeological excavations found several layers of whale and seal skinning tools. From the 16th to 18th century, First Nations and the Basques hunted seals in Pipounapi cove whose meaning is "Here, it does not freeze." In 1653, the surrounding territory was conceded to Lord Robert Giffard de Moncel by the governor of New France. Remains of two ovens used to collect grease for lighting were found. The first one, with double burner, was built in the late 16th century. Jesuit Evangelist Pierre Laure settled there in 1721. The following year, a chapel and a house were erected. A plot about the fact that too many religious activities - there was a daily public prayer - left no time for First Nations to hunt, led to the abandonment of the mission in 1725. In 1730, the Barragory brothers erected a whaling station and built the second oven with triple burner. Due to the lack of profit, this station was abandoned in 1773. In the absence of real development, the domain went back as Domain of the King.

At the time of Admiral Henry Wolsey Bayfield hydrographic survey around 1830, all that remained was the cellar of the house with its stone fireplace, hence the reference to Cave Cove on the map while Bon-Désir was moved three miles further west. Seals hunting went on for some times. In 1847, 136 seals were killed there.

On August 10, 1864, a landslide took off a large section of the squatters road (now part of the Morillon hiking trail). On April 11, 1896, another landslide moved down 500 acres on a two miles length strip of farmland with a dozen houses.

=== Settlement ===
During his visits in 1603 and 1626, Samuel de Champlain refers to two rivers under the names "Bergeronnette" and "Bergeronnes". It was long thought that he mistook the local larks for wagtails ("Bergeronnettes" in French). However, the name place is formed from the word "bank" and the radical "raa", widely used in Europe to denote heights. The name is probably a reference to the height of the bank.

The first homes gathered around mills. A first one was built in Petites-Bergeronnes in 1844. A sawmill and a flour mill were erected in 1845 on the Beaulieu River, a tributary with the river-Bas-de-Soie, of the Bergeronnes river at the site that will become the heart of the parish. A third mill was built in 1846 at Bon-Désir.

In 1856 a road costing $5,391.02 provides a link to Tadoussac to the west and Escoumins to the east. Until then, settlers had to carry their grain on their backs through the woods. The population reaches 200.

In 1852 the first chapel, dedicated to St. Zoe, served a little over thirty families living in the logging or agriculture. This chapel was destroyed in 1858 and rebuilt in 1869. Shortly after in the middle of the 19th century, Mission of Sainte-Zoé was founded and became a parish in 1889 receiving its first resident pastor, Arthur Guay. The actual church was built in 1912 at a cost of $28,000.

In 1874, the Bergeronnes Township was proclaimed, and in 1898, Township Municipality of Bergeronnes was formed. In 1929, the village centre on the Big Bergeronnes River separated from the township and became the Village Municipality of Grandes-Bergeronnes.

In 1918, from mid-October to mid-November, Spanish flu spread through the Saint Lawrence River north shore region: up to 46 percent of the population became infected. Bergeronnes had 976 people at this time, and 26 died from influenza.

The economic crisis of the 1930s led to the closing of wood mills. Having no land on which to fall back in expectation of better days, dozens of families left the village and accepted offers of the Ministry of Colonization to settle, around 1931, in Sainte-Thérèse-de-Colombier.

On December 29, 1999, the village and township were merged again to form the new Municipality of Les Bergeronnes.

== Climate ==
Climate data for Les Bergeronnes (Grandes-Bergeronnes), 1991–2020 normals, extremes 1951–present
Month	Jan	Feb	Mar	Apr	May	Jun	Jul	Aug	Sep	Oct	Nov	Dec	Year
Record high °C (°F)	10.0 (50.0)	10.0 (50.0)	18.0 (64.4)	26.0 (78.8)	33.3 (91.9)	34.5 (94.1)	34.4 (93.9)	35.6 (96.1)	30.5 (86.9)	23.9 (75.0)	19.9 (67.8)	11.5 (52.7)	35.6 (96.1)
Mean daily maximum °C (°F)	−8.2 (17.2)	−6.1 (21.0)	−0.8 (30.6)	6.1 (43.0)	14.0 (57.2)	19.4 (66.9)	22.3 (72.1)	21.5 (70.7)	16.5 (61.7)	9.4 (48.9)	2.9 (37.2)	−3.7 (25.3)	7.8 (46.0)
Daily mean °C (°F)	−12.5 (9.5)	−10.5 (13.1)	−5.3 (22.5)	2.2 (36.0)	9.1 (48.4)	14.4 (57.9)	17.3 (63.1)	16.6 (61.9)	11.9 (53.4)	5.8 (42.4)	−0.3 (31.5)	−7.3 (18.9)	3.5 (38.3)
Mean daily minimum °C (°F)	−16.6 (2.1)	−15.0 (5.0)	−9.4 (15.1)	−1.8 (28.8)	4.2 (39.6)	9.4 (48.9)	12.4 (54.3)	11.7 (53.1)	7.3 (45.1)	2.1 (35.8)	−3.4 (25.9)	−10.9 (12.4)	−0.8 (30.6)
Record low °C (°F)	−35.6 (−32.1)	−35.1 (−31.2)	−34.4 (−29.9)	−19.6 (−3.3)	−7.8 (18.0)	−1.9 (28.6)	3.8 (38.8)	1.4 (34.5)	−5.4 (22.3)	−13.2 (8.2)	−21.9 (−7.4)	−33.0 (−27.4)	−35.6 (−32.1)
Average precipitation mm (inches)	63.3 (2.49)	68.3 (2.69)	74.0 (2.91)	98.0 (3.86)	96.4 (3.80)	101.2 (3.98)	113.2 (4.46)	111.3 (4.38)	110.2 (4.34)	123.7 (4.87)	78.4 (3.09)	85.8 (3.38)	1,123.7 (44.24)
Average rainfall mm (inches)	11.7 (0.46)	5.3 (0.21)	20.5 (0.81)	75.7 (2.98)	99.0 (3.90)	107.1 (4.22)	115.2 (4.54)	115.0 (4.53)	110.9 (4.37)	117.7 (4.63)	54.4 (2.14)	27.4 (1.08)	860.1 (33.86)
Average snowfall cm (inches)	50.9 (20.0)	63.5 (25.0)	51.5 (20.3)	21.1 (8.3)	1.3 (0.5)	0.0 (0.0)	0.0 (0.0)	0.0 (0.0)	0.0 (0.0)	4.6 (1.8)	22.0 (8.7)	66.3 (26.1)	281.1 (110.7)
Average precipitation days (≥ 0.2 mm)	11.3	10.2	11.4	11.9	14.7	13.1	16.8	13.3	13.5	15.1	11.4	12.0	154.6
Average rainy days (≥ 0.2 mm)	1.6	1.0	3.7	10.0	14.8	13.6	17.0	13.6	13.8	14.6	8.2	3.2	115.0
Average snowy days (≥ 0.2 cm)	9.8	9.0	8.1	3.5	0.21	0.0	0.0	0.0	0.0	0.76	4.4	10.2	45.6
Mean monthly sunshine hours	92.6	113.6	156.8	167.5	203.1	224.5	234.3	215.7	166.6	119.0	83.6	75.3	1,852.7
Percentage possible sunshine	33.8	39.5	42.6	40.9	43.1	46.8	48.3	48.6	44.0	35.4	30.0	28.8	40.2
Source: Environment Canada (sun 1971–2000) April record low August record low November record high

== Demographics ==
Historical census populations – Les Bergeronnes
Year	Pop.	±%
2001	695	—
2006	655	−5.8%
2011	693	+5.8%
2016	661	−4.6%
2021	619	−6.4%
Source: Statistics Canada

Private dwellings occupied by usual residents in 2021: 289 (total dwellings: 319)

Mother tongue (2021):

- English as first language: 0%
- French as first language: 99.2%
- English and French as first language: 0.8%
- Other as first language: 0%

Historical census populations – Bergeronnes Township

Year	Pop.	±%
1921	822	—
1931	507	−38.3%
1941	550	+8.5%
1951	484	−12.0%
1956	517	+6.8%
1961	503	−2.7%
1966	395	−21.5%

Year	Pop.	±%
1971	328	−17.0%
1976	257	−21.6%
1981	263	+2.3%
1986	249	−5.3%
1991	202	−18.9%
1996	212	+5.0%

Population counts are not adjusted for boundary changes.
Source: Statistics Canada

Historical census populations – Grandes-Bergeronnes Village

Year	Pop.	±%
1931	469	—
1941	503	+7.2%
1951	743	+47.7%
1956	810	+9.0%
1961	779	−3.8%
1966	846	+8.6%

Year	Pop.	±%
1971	802	−5.2%
1976	779	−2.9%
1981	748	−4.0%
1986	696	−7.0%
1991	623	−10.5%
1996	601	−3.5%

Source: Statistics Canada

== Economy ==
Mica deposits were exploited between 1891 and 1894 at the McGee mine, east side of Lake Charlotte and from 1936 to 1938, north of Lake Sirois. In 1895, the cheddar from three cheese making factories is exported to England.

In 1928, a first electric power plant lights up the village. In the 1940s, the Coopérative d'électricité du village Bergeronnes built two plants on the Bergeronnes river with the financial support of the Office of electrification. 2.2 MW are distributed along the North Shore region, from Tadoussac to Bersimis. This equipment was later bought by Hydro-Québec in 1964. Today, a private mini-plant at the same location provides 4.2 megawatts to Hydro-Québec.

Harvesting of blueberries has long been a source of additional income for families. In 1943, the Windsor Canning was still operating a cannery in village.

The whales can still be seen in the St-Lawrence river and are an important pole of attraction with the observatory spots on the shore and whale watching excursions. In late July, the Blue Whale annual Festival is held. An important component of outdoor excursions includes bear watching, kayaking and horseback riding.

The timber industry is also active with the Coopérative forestière La Nord Côtière and Bersaco sawmill specializes in the manufacture of pallets for transportation.

== Local government ==
List of former mayors:

- Francis Bouchard (...–2021)
- Nathalie Ross (2021–present)

== Tourist attractions ==
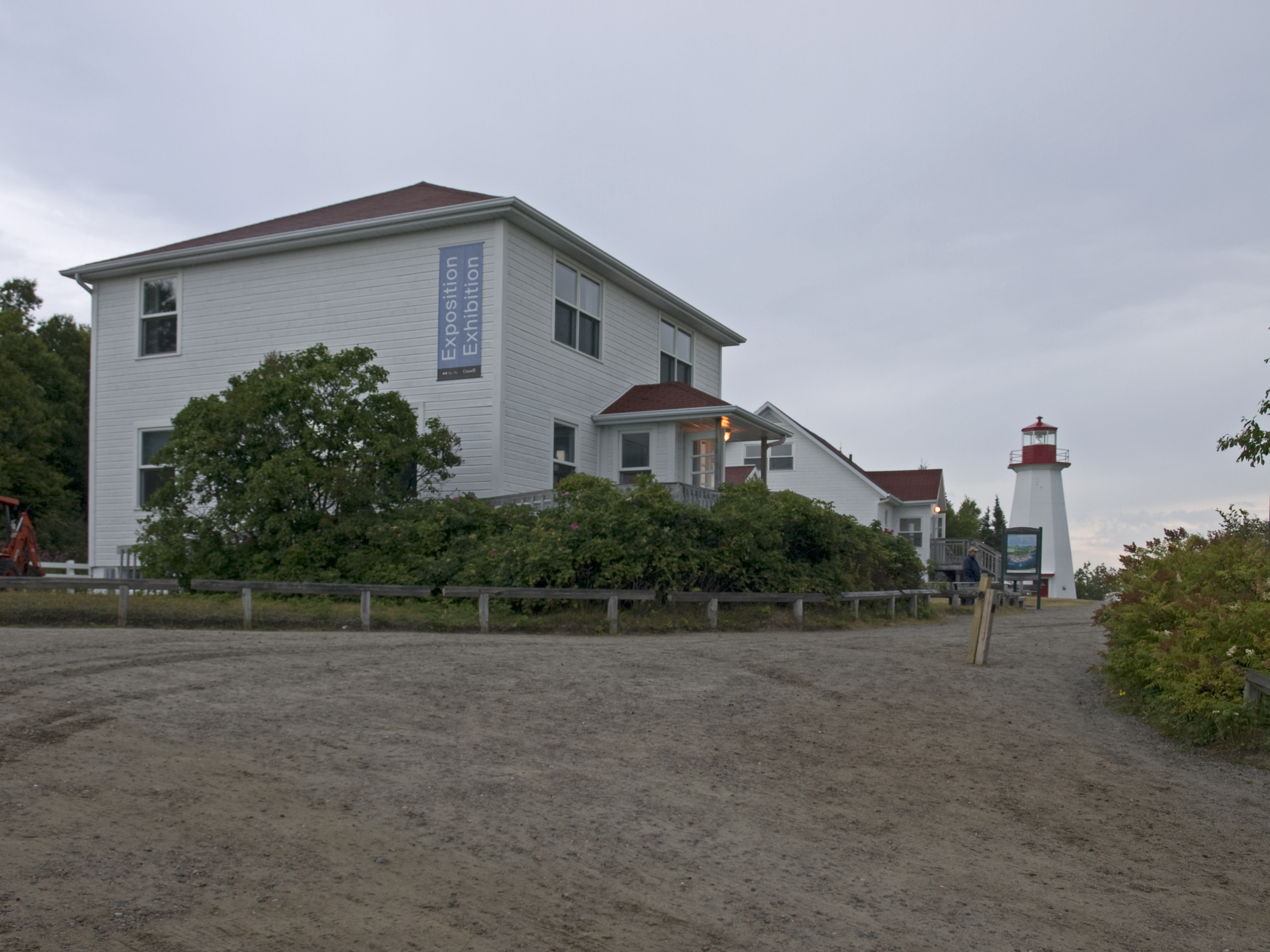
Cap de Bon Desir lighthouse

At Bon-Désir:

- Cap-de-Bon-Désir is a natural headland that is ideal for observing marine mammals. The site also provides visitors with the opportunity to participate in a variety of interpretation activities
- Located on the shores of the Saint Lawrence Estuary, offering 40 hectares of natural spaces, the Bon Désir Camp Site is the ideal place for several nature activities.

At Bergeronnes:

- The sea school of Explo-nature offers stays for students to learn about the marine environment of the Saint Lawrence
- The Pointe à John wharf is the starting point for whale-watching excursions and an excellent bird watching site.

== Priest Thibeault ==
Named pastor in 1928, Joseph Thibeault began to modernize agriculture in the village through conferences, by establishing a model farm and went as far as to buy a stallion to improve the local livestock. The following year, he supported the establishment of three nuns of Our Lady of Good Counsel, who came to found a schoolhouse. In 1938, he founded a poultry farming cooperative. At one point, as much as 1700 birds were slaughtered in 3 days time. But these facilities were destroyed by fire.

The small community was still left on its own in wintertime. Thibeault thought this was unacceptable; the priest had a tractor put on a barge and hauled down from Chicoutimi. In 1938 it was used to clear a runway that became Grandes-Bergeronnes Airport and later Les Bergeronnes Aerodrome and launch an air transportation service, called Charlevoix-Saguenay. The primarily purpose was humanitarian, as wounded and seriously ill were transported to hospitals.

After a break during the Second World War, the service resumed in 1944 with eight aircraft. It then also transported surveyors and loggers. In need of mechanics, the priest created a local technical school. But in 1948 the main hangar burned down which meant the end of the Charlevoix-Saguenay company, who had no insurance. Priest Thibault retired in 1948 because of illness.

== Priest Gendron ==
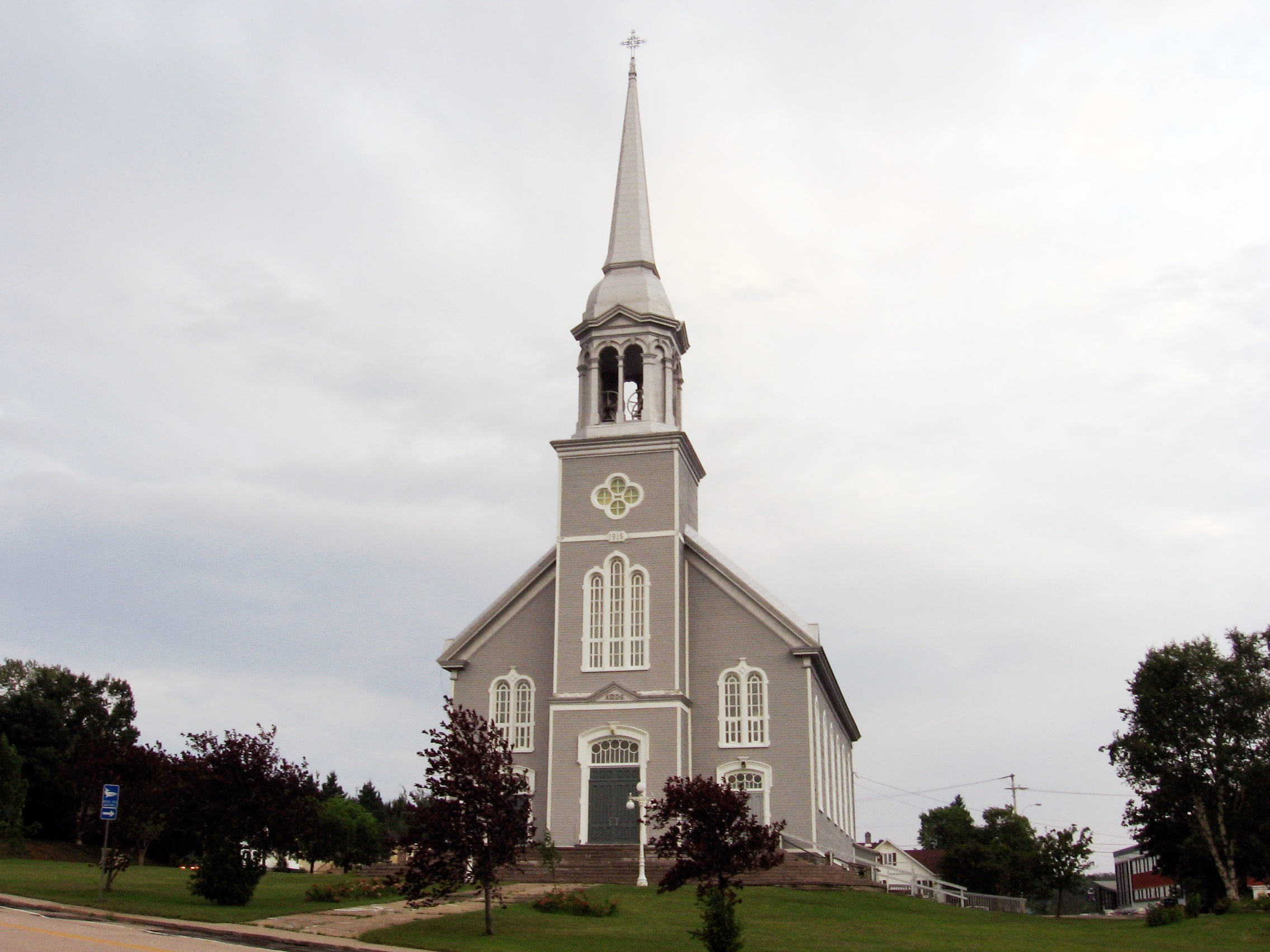
Les Bergeronnes

Priest Gendron came to Les Bergeronnes in March 1948 aboard a schooner that had slipped through the ice on the Saint Lawrence River. His priority was education. In 1952, the new building of the school of arts and crafts founded by his predecessor, is inaugurated. This building now houses municipal services. In 1954, the Dominic Savio school for commerce was opened.

In 1967, the Notre-Dame-du-Bon-Conseil pavilion provided boarding for 72 girls from outside and 90 boys from all over the region were studying at the Dominic Savio school. At the same time, the priest began the construction of civic hockey centre with an indoor ice ring. But provincial law 55 on public education was changed so that free education was only to be provided for local residents and the pavilion was converted into a hotel for a while before becoming "La maison de la mer", headquarter of the Explos-Nature group, still active today. The last work of the priest, now a bishop, was the construction of a foster care centre for elderly people.

In the 1980s, a regional high school was erected for the neighbouring Tadoussac, Les Escoumins and Sacre-Coeur students, thus confirming the educational vocation of Les Bergeronnes.

== See also ==
- List of municipalities in Quebec
