= Sainte-Agathe, Quebec (designated place) =

Coordinates: 46.383985°N 71.409556°W

Sainte-Agathe is an unincorporated community in Quebec, Canada. It is recognized as a designated place by Statistics Canada.

== Demographics ==
In the 2021 Census of Population conducted by Statistics Canada, Sainte-Agathe had a population of 585 living in 275 of its 286 total private dwellings, a change of -6.3% from its 2016 population of 624. With a land area of 4.43 km^{2} (1.71 sq mi), it had a population density of 132.1/km^{2} (342.0/sq mi) in 2021.

== See also ==
- List of communities in Quebec
- List of designated places in Quebec
