= Saint-Louis-de-l'Isle-aux-Coudres, Quebec =

Coordinates: 47.370430°N 70.409751°W

Saint-Louis-de-l'Isle-aux-Coudres is an unincorporated community in Quebec, Canada. It is recognized as a designated place by Statistics Canada.

== Demographics ==
In the 2021 Census of Population conducted by Statistics Canada, Saint-Louis-de-l'Isle-aux-Coudres had a population of 342 living in 183 of its 236 total private dwellings, a change of 2.1% from its 2016 population of 335. With a land area of 11.13 km^{2} (4.30 sq mi), it had a population density of 30.7/km^{2} (79.6/sq mi) in 2021.

== See also ==
- List of communities in Quebec
- List of designated places in Quebec
