= William Lake (Québec) =

Lake in Centre-du-Québec, Quebec (Canada)

- Lac William (French)
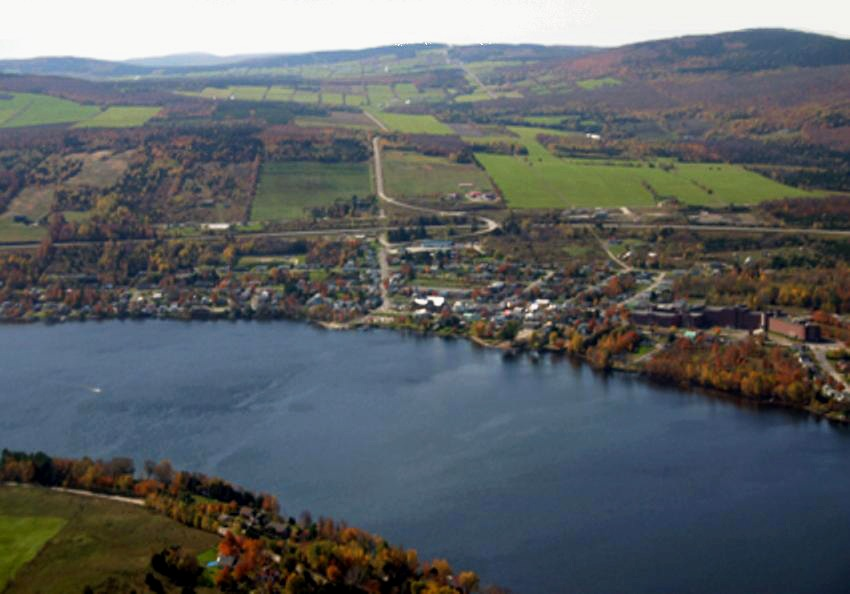
- Aerial view of Lake William and Saint-Ferdinand

- Location within Quebec
- Location: Canada, Quebec, Centre-du-Québec, L'Érable Regional County Municipality
- Coordinates: 46.12533°N 71.57184°W
- Primary inflows: (Clockwise from the mouth) Dubois River, Bécancour River, ruisseau Gardiner, Fortier River, ruisseau Pinette.
- Primary outflows: Bécancour River
- Max. length: 6.8 kilometres (4.2 mi)
- Max. width: 1.4 kilometres (0.87 mi)
- Surface area: 4.89 kilometres (3.04 mi)
- Average depth: 30 metres (98 ft)
- Surface elevation: 193 metres (633 ft)
- Frozen: End of December to beginning of March

The William Lake (in French: Lac William) is a lake located in the municipality of Saint-Ferdinand, in L'Érable Regional County Municipality (MRC), in the administrative region of Centre-du-Québec, in Quebec, in Canada. It is crossed by the Bécancour River, which flows up to the South shore of St. Lawrence River.

== Toponymy ==
The lake had been named Saint-Ferdinand by the French Canadians established on the southwest shore of the lake around 1850, but the current name comes from the Scots, living in the north. This name commemorates William Pitt, a popular statesman of England.

== Geography ==
Its area is approximately 4.899 kilometres (3.04 mi), its altitude is 193 metres (633 ft) and its maximum depth is 30 metres (98 ft).

== See also ==
- Bécancour River
