= Saint-Elzéar, Quebec (designated place) =

Coordinates: 46.406505°N 71.060387°W

Saint-Elzéar is an unincorporated community in Quebec, Canada. It is recognized as a designated place by Statistics Canada.

== Demographics ==
In the 2021 Census of Population conducted by Statistics Canada, Saint-Elzéar had a population of 1,945 living in 753 of its 764 total private dwellings, a change of 9.5% from its 2016 population of 1,776. With a land area of 6.17 km^{2} (2.38 sq mi), it had a population density of 315.2/km^{2} (816.5/sq mi) in 2021.

== See also ==
- List of communities in Quebec
- List of designated places in Quebec
