= List of designated places in Quebec =

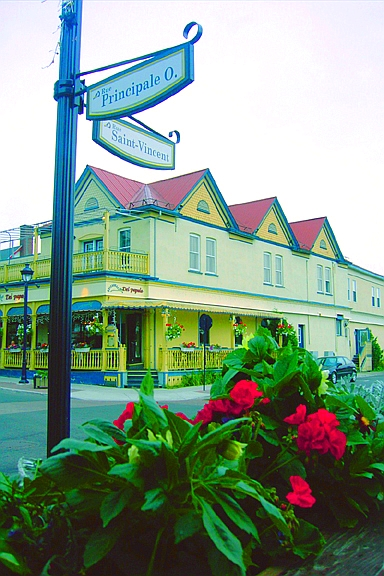
Downtown Sainte-Agathe-des-Monts, Quebec's most populous designated place

A designated place is a type of geographic unit used by Statistics Canada to disseminate census data. It is usually "a small community that does not meet the criteria used to define incorporated municipalities or Statistics Canada population centres (areas with a population of at least 1,000 and no fewer than 400 persons per square kilometre)." Provincial and territorial authorities collaborate with Statistics Canada in the creation of designated places so that data can be published for sub-areas within municipalities. Starting in 2016, Statistics Canada allowed the overlapping of designated places with population centres.

In the 2021 Census of Population, Quebec had 120 designated places, an increase from 117 in 2016. Designated place types in Quebec include 14 retired population centres, 94 dissolved municipalities (municipalité dissoute), and 12 unconstituted localities (localité non constituée). In 2021, the 120 designated places had a cumulative population of 80,697 and an average population of 672. Quebec's largest designated place is Sainte-Agathe-des-Monts with a population of 6,740.

== List ==
List of designated places in Quebec
Name	Type	2021 Census of Population				
Name	Type	Population (2021)	Population (2016)	Change (%)	Land area (km^{2})	Population density (per km^{2})
Amqui	Dissolved municipality	272	266	+2.3%	2.45	111.0/km^{2}
Amulet	Retired population centre	1,350	1,340	+0.7%	1.86	725.8/km^{2}
Andréville	Dissolved municipality	269	263	+2.3%	4.24	63.4/km^{2}
Armagh	Dissolved municipality	733	739	−0.8%	0.92	796.7/km^{2}
Aston-Jonction	Dissolved municipality	281	261	+7.7%	1.55	181.3/km^{2}
Baie du Milieu	Dissolved municipality	15	33	−54.5%	9.61	1.6/km^{2}
Beaucanton	Unconstituted locality	153	152	+0.7%	28.21	5.4/km^{2}
Beaulac	Dissolved municipality	451	434	+3.9%	8.35	54.0/km^{2}
Beebe Plain	Dissolved municipality	867	854	+1.5%	7.87	110.2/km^{2}
Bernierville	Retired population centre	977	994	−1.7%	1.99	491.0/km^{2}
Bishopton	Dissolved municipality	450	441	+2.0%	9.82	45.8/km^{2}
Blanc-Sablon	Dissolved municipality	112	116	−3.4%	0.54	207.4/km^{2}
Calumet	Dissolved municipality	521	550	−5.3%	4.75	109.7/km^{2}
Cap-Chat	Retired population centre	955	1,072	−10.9%	1.15	830.4/km^{2}
Carillon	Dissolved municipality	266	207	+28.5%	6.17	43.1/km^{2}
Chapeau	Dissolved municipality	325	373	−12.9%	5.75	56.5/km^{2}
Chevery	Unconstituted locality	226	236	−4.2%	3.93	57.5/km^{2}
Chute-aux-Outardes	Retired population centre	924	1,059	−12.7%	0.48	1,925.0/km^{2}
Clarenceville	Dissolved municipality	177	217	−18.4%	4.17	42.4/km^{2}
Coleraine	Retired population centre	1,067	1,043	+2.3%	4.17	255.9/km^{2}
Cookshire	Retired population centre	950	1,021	−7.0%	2.02	470.3/km^{2}
De Grasse	Dissolved municipality	10	0	NA	1.38	7.2/km^{2}
Deschaillons-sur-Saint-Laurent	Dissolved municipality	633	649	−2.5%	6.48	97.7/km^{2}
Eastman	Dissolved municipality	961	880	+9.2%	12.48	77.0/km^{2}
Fortierville	Dissolved municipality	396	398	−0.5%	1.16	341.4/km^{2}
Frelighsburg	Dissolved municipality	285	267	+6.7%	1.76	161.9/km^{2}
Gracefield	Dissolved municipality	620	631	−1.7%	3	206.7/km^{2}
Grandes-Bergeronnes	Dissolved municipality	453	492	−7.9%	4.82	94.0/km^{2}
Harrington Harbour	Unconstituted locality	205	229	−10.5%	2.31	88.7/km^{2}
Hébertville	Retired population centre	981	1,085	−9.6%	0.75	1,308.0/km^{2}
Henryville	Dissolved municipality	655	596	+9.9%	0.76	861.8/km^{2}
Inverness	Dissolved municipality	246	227	+8.4%	4	61.5/km^{2}
Kamouraska	Dissolved municipality	328	349	−6.0%	7.33	44.7/km^{2}
Kegashka	Unconstituted locality	124	95	+30.5%	3.06	40.5/km^{2}
La Baleine	Dissolved municipality	233	232	+0.4%	10.52	22.1/km^{2}
La Patrie	Dissolved municipality	317	299	+6.0%	0.78	406.4/km^{2}
La Pérade	Dissolved municipality	820	819	+0.1%	6.1	134.4/km^{2}
La Romaine	Unconstituted locality	63	5	+1,160.0%	1.02	61.8/km^{2}
Lac-Carré	Dissolved municipality	1,031	976	+5.6%	1.79	576.0/km^{2}
Lac-des-Écorces	Dissolved municipality	800	824	−2.9%	4.34	184.3/km^{2}
L'Annonciation	Retired population centre	1,735	1,598	+8.6%	10.12	171.4/km^{2}
L'Ascension-de-Notre-Seigneur	Retired population centre	1,116	1,134	−1.6%	2.37	470.9/km^{2}
Laurierville	Dissolved municipality	701	718	−2.4%	3.58	195.8/km^{2}
Leclercville	Dissolved municipality	252	242	+4.1%	3.05	82.6/km^{2}
Les Becquets	Dissolved municipality	451	457	−1.3%	3.03	148.8/km^{2}
Les Cèdres	Dissolved municipality	35	41	−14.6%	0.14	250.0/km^{2}
L'Île-d'Entrée	Dissolved municipality	74	90	−17.8%	3.98	18.6/km^{2}
L'Islet	Dissolved municipality	910	842	+8.1%	1.49	610.7/km^{2}
L'Islet-sur-Mer	Dissolved municipality	652	639	+2.0%	1.69	385.8/km^{2}
L'Isle-Verte	Dissolved municipality	888	861	+3.1%	8.71	102.0/km^{2}
Lorrainville	Dissolved municipality	977	964	+1.3%	3.65	267.7/km^{2}
Lourdes-de-Blanc-Sablon	Unconstituted locality	827	849	−2.6%	9.25	89.4/km^{2}
Manseau	Dissolved municipality	438	424	+3.3%	2.53	173.1/km^{2}
Mont-Saint-Grégoire	Dissolved municipality	795	939	−15.3%	1.74	456.9/km^{2}
Neuville	Dissolved municipality	1,116	1,115	+0.1%	6.87	162.4/km^{2}
Old Fort	Unconstituted locality	256	234	+9.4%	3.43	74.6/km^{2}
Philipsburg	Dissolved municipality	292	280	+4.3%	1.76	165.9/km^{2}
Radisson	Unconstituted locality	203	468	−56.6%	4.83	42.0/km^{2}
Ripon	Dissolved municipality	684	703	−2.7%	4.87	140.5/km^{2}
Rivière-Beaudette	Dissolved municipality	148	155	−4.5%	0.36	411.1/km^{2}
Rivière-Saint-Paul	Dissolved municipality	147	100	+47.0%	0.2	735.0/km^{2}
Rock Island	Dissolved municipality	927	897	+3.3%	7.36	126.0/km^{2}
Saint-Alban	Dissolved municipality	618	548	+12.8%	1.64	376.8/km^{2}
Saint-Bernard	Dissolved municipality	476	476	0.0%	0.37	1,286.5/km^{2}
Saint-Bernard-de-l'Île-aux-Coudres	Dissolved municipality	541	576	−6.1%	7.82	69.2/km^{2}
Saint-Charles-des-Grondines	Dissolved municipality	475	466	+1.9%	7.07	67.2/km^{2}
Saint-Charles-sur-Richelieu	Dissolved municipality	556	553	+0.5%	2.95	188.5/km^{2}
Saint-Chrysostome	Dissolved municipality	683	793	−13.9%	0.57	1,198.2/km^{2}
Saint-Elzéar	Dissolved municipality	1,945	1,776	+9.5%	6.17	315.2/km^{2}
Saint-Flavien	Dissolved municipality	984	975	+0.9%	6.3	156.2/km^{2}
Saint-Gabriel	Dissolved municipality	616	582	+5.8%	9.93	62.0/km^{2}
Saint-Georges-de-Cacouna	Dissolved municipality	1,098	1,099	−0.1%	6.99	157.1/km^{2}
Saint-Guillaume	Dissolved municipality	767	744	+3.1%	1.52	504.6/km^{2}
Saint-Herménégilde	Dissolved municipality	163	156	+4.5%	9.72	16.8/km^{2}
Saint-Isidore	Dissolved municipality	1,333	1,122	+18.8%	7.44	179.2/km^{2}
Saint-Jean-de-Dieu	Unconstituted locality	1,027	987	+4.1%	3.35	306.6/km^{2}
Saint-Joseph-de-la-Rive	Dissolved municipality	231	189	+22.2%	4.03	57.3/km^{2}
Saint-Léonard-d'Aston	Dissolved municipality	1,088	1,062	+2.4%	1.28	850.0/km^{2}
Saint-Liboire	Dissolved municipality	399	258	+54.7%	0.84	475.0/km^{2}
Saint-Louis-de-l'Isle-aux-Coudres	Dissolved municipality	342	335	+2.1%	11.13	30.7/km^{2}
Saint-Ludger	Dissolved municipality	120	133	−9.8%	0.14	857.1/km^{2}
Saint-Ours	Dissolved municipality	482	443	+8.8%	0.38	1,268.4/km^{2}
Saint-Patrice-de-Beaurivage	Dissolved municipality	377	310	+21.6%	0.48	785.4/km^{2}
Saint-Paulin	Dissolved municipality	690	702	−1.7%	1.2	575.0/km^{2}
Saint-Placide	Dissolved municipality	431	417	+3.4%	0.97	444.3/km^{2}
Saint-Polycarpe	Dissolved municipality	1,421	1,228	+15.7%	3.31	429.3/km^{2}
Saint-Siméon	Dissolved municipality	753	823	−8.5%	5.56	135.4/km^{2}
Saint-Sylvestre	Dissolved municipality	459	443	+3.6%	0.48	956.3/km^{2}
Saint-Ulric	Dissolved municipality	583	595	−2.0%	2.52	231.3/km^{2}
Saint-Vallier	Dissolved municipality	464	485	−4.3%	1.85	250.8/km^{2}
Saint-Victor	Dissolved municipality	1,212	1,233	−1.7%	7.06	171.7/km^{2}
Saint-Wenceslas	Dissolved municipality	368	362	+1.7%	0.57	645.6/km^{2}
Saint-Zacharie	Dissolved municipality	983	955	+2.9%	6.63	148.3/km^{2}
Sainte-Agathe	Dissolved municipality	585	624	−6.2%	4.43	132.1/km^{2}
Sainte-Agathe-des-Monts	Retired population centre	6,740	6,082	+10.8%	15.84	425.5/km^{2}
Sainte-Angèle-de-Mérici	Dissolved municipality	493	465	+6.0%	3.39	145.4/km^{2}
Sainte-Anne-du-Lac	Dissolved municipality	375	342	+9.6%	3.08	121.8/km^{2}
Sainte-Clotilde-de-Horton	Dissolved municipality	349	412	−15.3%	1.76	198.3/km^{2}
Sainte-Félicité	Dissolved municipality	552	572	−3.5%	1.82	303.3/km^{2}
Sainte-Monique	Dissolved municipality	194	200	−3.0%	0.75	258.7/km^{2}
Sault-au-Mouton	Dissolved municipality	451	509	−11.4%	4.7	96.0/km^{2}
Sawyerville	Dissolved municipality	782	802	−2.5%	12.78	61.2/km^{2}
Sayabec	Retired population centre	1,122	1,163	−3.5%	3.18	352.8/km^{2}
Scott	Dissolved municipality	842	813	+3.6%	2.31	364.5/km^{2}
Shenley	Dissolved municipality	958	916	+4.6%	8.88	107.9/km^{2}
Stanstead Plain	Dissolved municipality	1,030	1,037	−0.7%	6.72	153.3/km^{2}
Sutton	Dissolved municipality	1,787	1,782	+0.3%	9.04	197.7/km^{2}
Taschereau	Dissolved municipality	469	503	−6.8%	2.75	170.5/km^{2}
Tête-à-la-Baleine	Unconstituted locality	119	145	−17.9%	10.69	11.1/km^{2}
Upton	Dissolved municipality	1,092	1,135	−3.8%	3.13	348.9/km^{2}
Val Barrette	Dissolved municipality	619	599	+3.3%	4.79	129.2/km^{2}
Val-Brillant	Dissolved municipality	452	480	−5.8%	3.13	144.4/km^{2}
Val-David	Retired population centre	2,271	2,592	−12.4%	2.51	904.8/km^{2}
Val-Paradis	Unconstituted locality	186	155	+20.0%	38.48	4.8/km^{2}
Villebois	Unconstituted locality	173	157	+10.2%	17.78	9.7/km^{2}
Weedon Centre	Retired population centre	1,022	1,059	−3.5%	4.83	211.6/km^{2}
Wemotaci	Retired population centre	950	1,038	−8.5%	0.41	2,317.1/km^{2}
Wottonville	Dissolved municipality	515	508	+1.4%	6.58	78.3/km^{2}
Yamaska	Dissolved municipality	490	461	+6.3%	2.04	240.2/km^{2}
Yamaska-Est	Dissolved municipality	268	267	+0.4%	0.41	653.7/km^{2}
Total designated places	—	80,697	80,118	+0.7%	565.33	142.7/km^{2}
Province of Quebec	—	8,501,833	8,164,361	+4.1%	1,298,599.75	6.5/km^{2}

== See also ==
- List of census agglomerations in Quebec
- List of population centres in Quebec
- List of unconstituted localities in Quebec
- 21st-century municipal history of Quebec
