= William Lake (Dean of Antigua) =

William Vincent Lake (1947–2003) was the Dean of Antigua from 1986 to 2003.

Lake was born on the island of St. Kitts and educated at the University of the West Indies and ordained in 1973. His early posts were in Montserrat followed by a post in Aruba.

There is a cultural centre named after him in Antigua.
