= Saint-Adrien-d'Irlande =

- Municipality
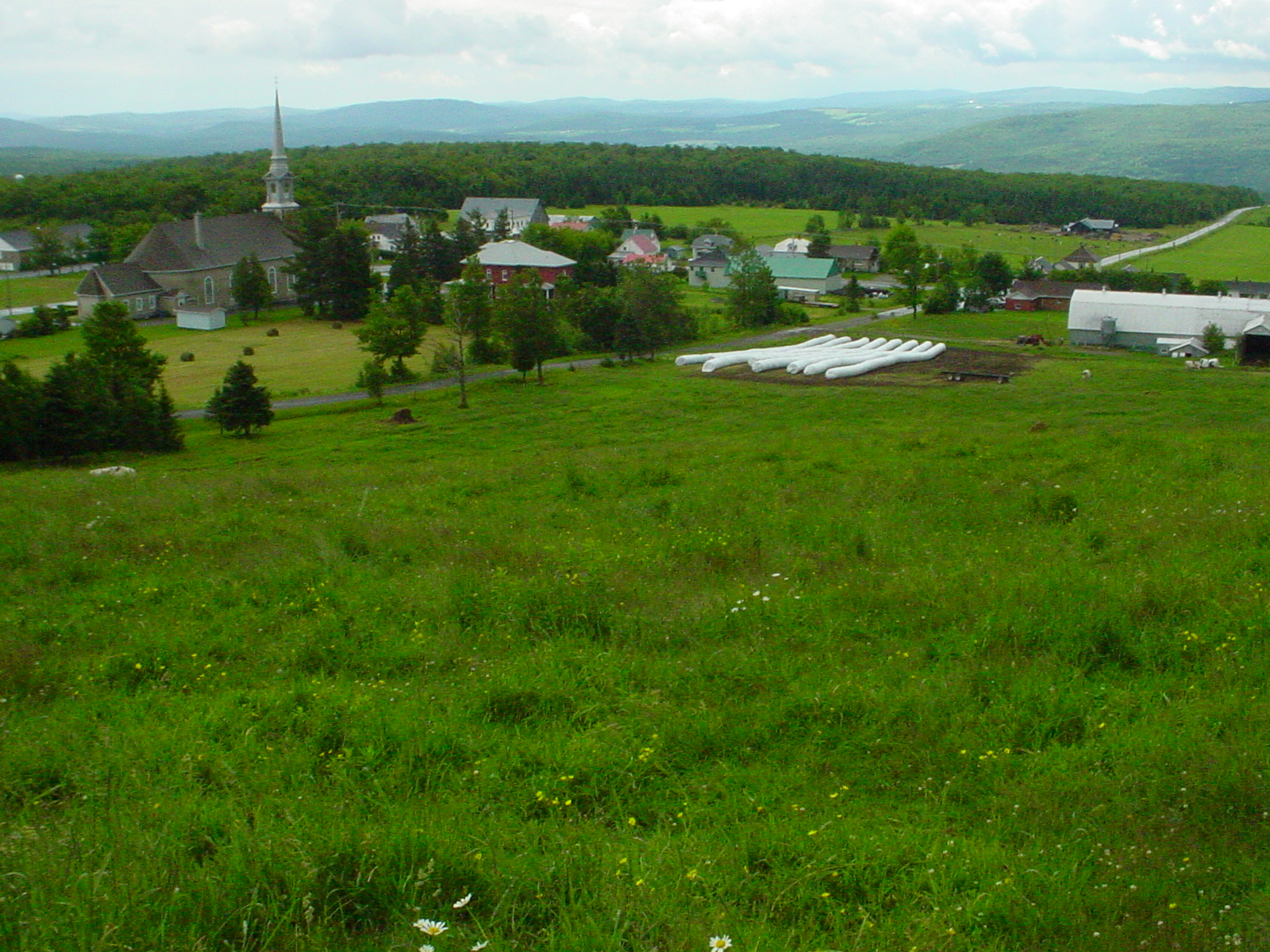

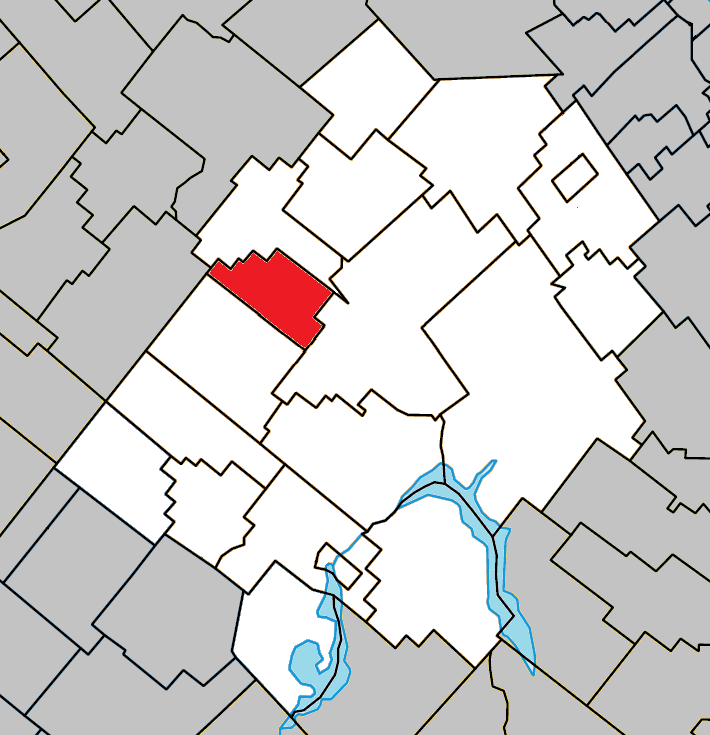
- Location within Les Appalaches RCM

- Location in province of Quebec
- Coordinates: 46°07′N 71°27′W
- Country: Canada
- Province: Quebec
- Region: Chaudière-Appalaches
- RCM: Les Appalaches
- Constituted: January 1, 1873
- Named for: Pope Adrian III and Ireland

Government
  - Mayor: Carl Croteau
  - Federal riding: Mégantic—L'Érable—Lotbinière
  - Prov. riding: Lotbinière-Frontenac

Area
  - Total: 53.00 km^{2} (20.46 sq mi)
  - Land: 53.18 km^{2} (20.53 sq mi)
- There is an apparent contradiction between two authoritative sources

Population (2021)
  - Total: 395
  - Density: 7.4/km^{2} (19/sq mi)
  - Pop 2016-2021: ▼1.0%
  - Dwellings: 209
- Time zone: UTC−5 (EST)
  - Summer (DST): UTC−4 (EDT)
- Postal code(s): G0N 1M0
- Area codes: 418 and 581
- Highways: R-216
- Website: stadriendirlande.ca

Saint-Adrien-d'Irlande (French pronunciation: [sɛ̃t‿adʁijɛ̃ diʁlɑ̃d]) is a municipality in the Municipalité régionale de comté des Appalaches in Quebec, Canada. It is part of the Chaudière-Appalaches region and the population is 400 as of 2019.

Until 1982, Saint-Adrien-d'Irlande was known as Ireland-Partie-Nord, to differentiate from the south part, today's Irlande. Then it took the name of the parish, which was named after Pope Adrian III.
