= Irlande =

- Municipality
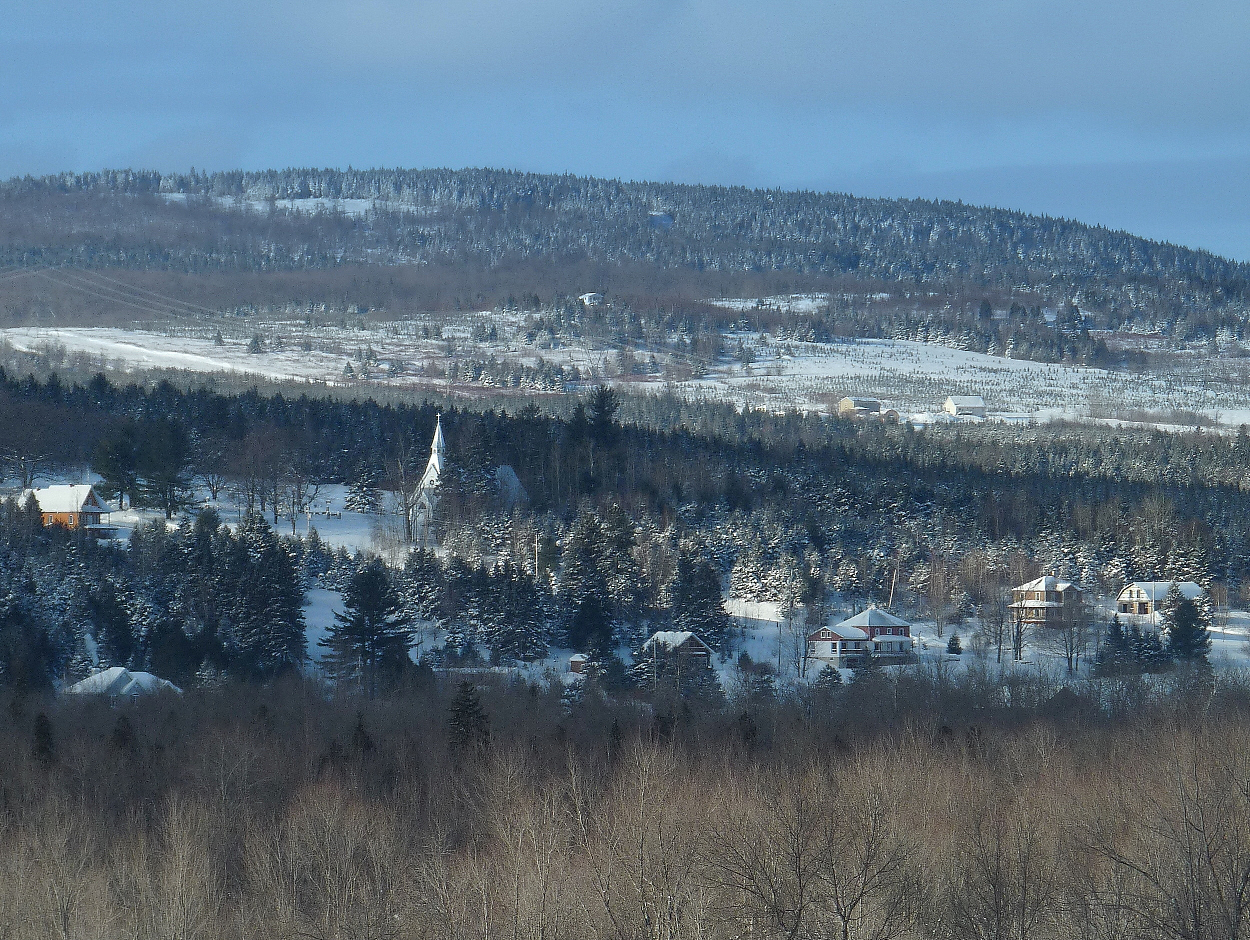

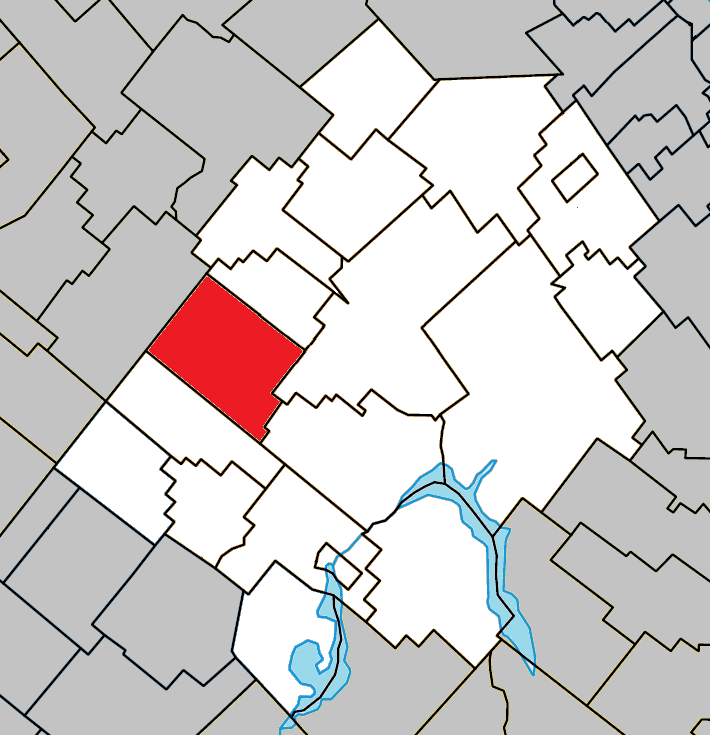
- Location within Les Appalaches RCM.

- Location in province of Quebec.
- Coordinates: 46°04′N 71°29′W
- Country: Canada
- Province: Quebec
- Region: Chaudière-Appalaches
- RCM: Les Appalaches
- Constituted: July 1, 1855

Government
  - Mayor: Jean François Hamel
  - Federal riding: Mégantic—L'Érable—Lotbinière
  - Prov. riding: Lotbinière-Frontenac

Area
  - Total: 112.10 km^{2} (43.28 sq mi)
  - Land: 109.54 km^{2} (42.29 sq mi)

Population (2021)
  - Total: 897
  - Density: 8.2/km^{2} (21/sq mi)
  - Pop 2016-2021: ▲1.5%
  - Dwellings: 435
- Time zone: UTC−5 (EST)
  - Summer (DST): UTC−4 (EDT)
- Postal code(s): G6H 2N7
- Area codes: 418 and 581
- Highways: R-165; R-216
- Website: www.mundirlande.qc.ca

Irlande (French pronunciation: [iʁlɑ̃d]) is a municipality in Les Appalaches Regional County Municipality in the Chaudière-Appalaches region of Quebec, Canada. Its population was 897 as of the Canada 2021 Census.

Irlande does not have a town or village centre, but the hamlet of Maple Grove, at the intersection of Chemins Craig and Gosford, constitutes the only notable urban agglomeration. This is where the Holy Trinity Anglican Church and the rectory are located.

The township of Ireland was first colonized by Irish settlers, who called the area "New Ireland." The municipality kept the English spelling until 1987, when it took the French "Irlande". "Irlande" is the French name for Ireland.

== History ==
Now a French-speaking area, it was formerly known as Ireland Township, a stronghold of the English-speaking community. Situated in the heart of the Appalachians, this municipality is predominantly rural. Before the wave of settlement that began in the 19th century, only the Abenaki people inhabited the area, largely due to the Thames River flowing upstream through the township. The settlement of the area known as Ireland dates back to the Constitutional Act of 1791, which formalised the township system in Canada. In the years that followed, Americans, English, Scots and Irish settled in these new colonial lands. These migratory movements led to the establishment of village settlements. The first settler in Ireland was the American Amos Hall. He settled on the very spot where the sector of Maple Grove would later be located. Born in Stonington, Connecticut, in 1761, he embarked on a military career at the age of 15. During the American Revolution, Hall became a member of the personal guard of Benedict Arnold, a general in the Continental Army. In the very early 19th century, he purchased his first plot of land in Lower Canada in Shipton, probably from the land surveyor Jessy Pennoyer. In 1804 or 1805, Hall undertook his first hunting expedition, during which he discovered Ireland. Rich in resources and well situated, Hall settled there permanently in 1807, bringing with him his wife Martha Straw and their 11 children.

When Craig Road was built in 1810, squatters such as Hall were forced to apply for title to their land, realising the risk of being evicted from the plot on which they had invested so much effort. A few years later, in 1831, work began on Gosford Road, branching off to the west from Craig Road in order to open up new regions to British colonisation. As a stronghold of the Anglican community, the canton remained predominantly English-speaking throughout the 19th century. Indeed, in 1831, the population stood at 440. Of this number, 154 were Anglicans, 80 Catholics, 78 Methodists, 54 Presbyterians and Congregationalists, 35 members of the Church of Scotland, 11 Baptists and 28 members of other religious denominations. The picture was quite different in 1871, when the census recorded a population of 990, comprising 419 Catholics, 480 Episcopalians, 28 Presbyterians, 58 Methodists and 5 members of other religious denominations. The original municipality of Ireland was officially created in 1855, and covered an area that included Saint-Joseph-de-Coleraine, Saint-Adrien-d'Irlande and most of Thetford Mines. In 1858, only three years after its creation, the name of the municipality was changed to Ireland-et-Coleraine. 15 years later, in 1873, Ireland-et-Coleraine was divided by the creation of municipality with a French-speaking majority named Ireland-Nord. The rest of Ireland-et-Coleraine forming an English-speaking majority.

However, 1891 saw the creation of the current municipality when Ireland-et-Coleraine was divided in two separate municipalities: the Coleraine part named Saint-Désiré-du-Lac-Noir and the Ireland part named Ireland-Sud. The proportion of the English-speaking population, however, remains high despite the waves of emigration affecting young Anglo-Protestants, who prefer the opportunities offered in Western Canada and the United States. Despite this significant migratory movement, construction of the second Holy Trinity Church began in 1900, a building that has stood the test of time to this day. Eventually during the middle of the 20th century, the named Ireland-Sud was shortened to simply Ireland. Then, in 1987, the name was officially translated to French to become Irlande. In 2003, the church was transferred to the local council under a long-term lease. Over the years, a number of local residents have volunteered their time to maintain and improve the site.

Since the organisation Verte Irlande was founded in 2004, cultural events for the local community have been held there every year. Verte Irlande, a grassroots initiative, led to the creation of the Association for the Protection of Lac à la Truite d’Irlande (APLTI) in 2015. This organisation, chaired by Réjean Vézina, works on the conservation of Lac à la Truite and its tributaries. Various studies are carried out in partnership with the Bécancour Watershed Consultation Group (GROBEC).
