= Saint-Ferdinand =

- Municipality
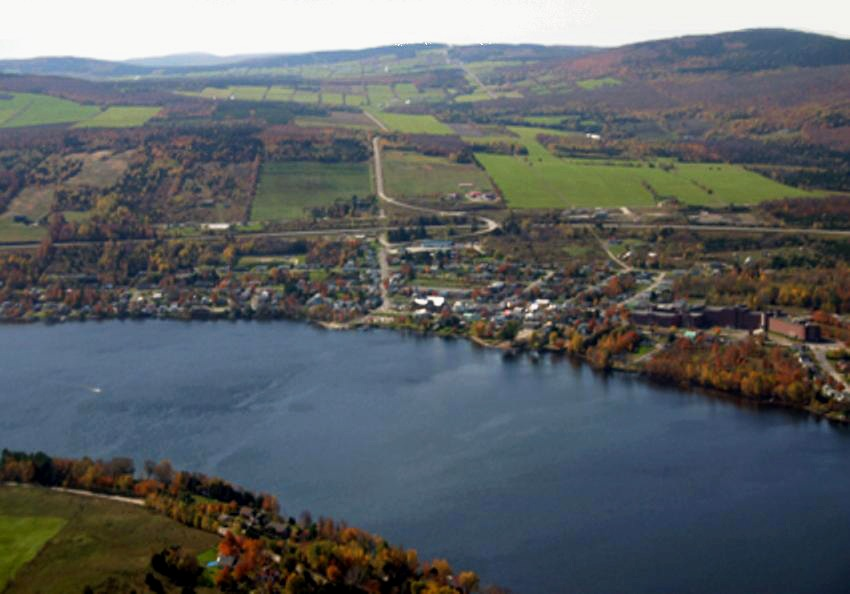
- Aerial view

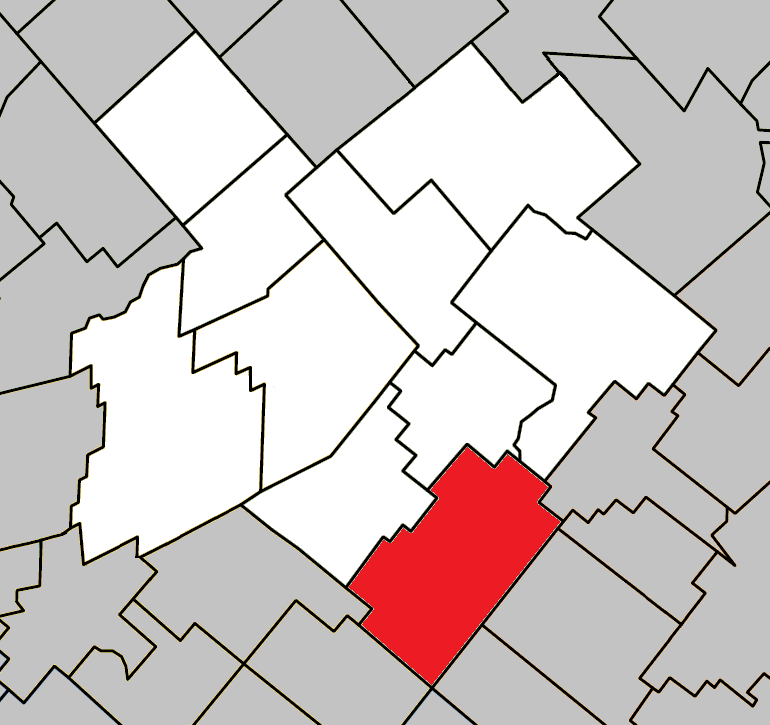
- Location within L'Érable RCM.

- Location in southern Quebec.
- Coordinates: 46°06′N 71°34′W
- Country: Canada
- Province: Quebec
- Region: Centre-du-Québec
- RCM: L'Érable
- Constituted: November 29, 2000

Government
  - Mayor: Jean Bernier
  - Federal riding: Mégantic—L'Érable—Lotbinière
  - Prov. riding: Arthabaska–L'Érable

Area
  - Total: 142.70 km^{2} (55.10 sq mi)
  - Land: 137.16 km^{2} (52.96 sq mi)

Population (2021)
  - Total: 2,007
  - Density: 14.6/km^{2} (38/sq mi)
  - Pop 2016-2021: ▼3.3%
  - Dwellings: 1,277
- Demonym: Ferdinois
- Time zone: UTC−5 (EST)
  - Summer (DST): UTC−4 (EDT)
- Postal code(s): G0N 1N0
- Area codes: 418 and 581
- Highways: R-165; R-216
- Website: www.municipalite.saint-ferdinand.qc.ca

Saint-Ferdinand (French pronunciation: [sɛ̃ fɛʁdinɑ̃]) is a municipality in the Centre-du-Québec region of the province of Quebec in Canada. It is notable for its location on the shores of William Lake on the Bécancour River, nestled within the Appalachian foothills, making Saint-Ferdinand a popular vacation spot in both summer (for sailing and surface water sports) and winter (for snowmobiling and ATV riding).

St-Ferdinand was once home to a large health care facility, the St-Julien Hospital, founded in 1870; however, rural exodus and the establishment of more advanced facilities in greater population centres such as Quebec City led to the indefinite closing of the facility in 2003, after several years of reduced operations as a long-term care facility.

Saint-Ferdinand has one elementary school, École Notre-Dame.
