= List of communities in Quebec =

This is a list of communities in Quebec. Currently, local municipalities belonging to a regional county municipality are not listed, but they can be accessed through the link to their regional county municipality. For a complete list, see List of municipalities in Quebec.

== Types of municipalities ==
- Types of municipalities in Quebec
- List of municipalities in Quebec
- List of township municipalities in Quebec
- List of united township municipalities in Quebec
- List of parish municipalities in Quebec
- List of village municipalities in Quebec
- List of cities and towns in Quebec
- List of Indian reserves in Quebec
- List of unorganized territories in Quebec

== Lists of communities ==
=== Abitibi-Témiscamingue ===
Regional County Municipalities

- Abitibi
- Abitibi-Ouest
- La Vallée-de-l'Or
- Témiscamingue

Independent City

- Rouyn-Noranda

Indian Reserves

- Kebaowek, Quebec
- Lac-Simon, Abitibi-Témiscamingue, Quebec
- Pikogan, Quebec
- Timiskaming First Nation

=== Bas-Saint-Laurent ===
Regional County Municipalities

- Kamouraska
- La Matapédia
- La Mitis
- Les Basques
- La Matanie
- Rimouski-Neigette
- Rivière-du-Loup
- Témiscouata

Indian Reserves

- Cacouna, Quebec
- Whitworth

=== Capitale-Nationale ===
Regional County Municipalities

- Charlevoix
- Charlevoix-Est
- La Côte-de-Beaupré
- La Jacques-Cartier
- L'Île-d'Orléans
- Portneuf

Independent Cities

- L'Ancienne-Lorette, Quebec
- Quebec City
- Saint-Augustin-de-Desmaures

Independent Parish

- Notre-Dame-des-Anges, Quebec

Indian Reserve

- Wendake, Quebec

=== Centre-du-Québec ===
Regional County Municipalities

- Arthabaska
- Bécancour
- Drummond
- L'Érable
- Nicolet-Yamaska

Indian Reserves

- Odanak, Quebec
- Wôlinak, Quebec

=== Chaudière-Appalaches ===
Regional County Municipalities

- Beauce-Sartigan
- Bellechasse
- La Nouvelle-Beauce
- Les Appalaches
- Les Etchemins
- L'Islet
- Lotbinière
- Montmagny
- Robert-Cliche

Independent City

- Lévis, Quebec
  - Borough of Desjardins
  - Borough of Les Chutes-de-la-Chaudière-Est
  - Borough of Les Chutes-de-la-Chaudière-Ouest

=== Côte-Nord ===
Regional county municipalities

- Caniapiscau
- La Haute-Côte-Nord
- Manicouagan
- Minganie
- Sept-Rivières

Independent municipalities

- Blanc-Sablon
- Bonne-Espérance
- Côte-Nord-du-Golfe-du-Saint-Laurent
- Gros-Mécatina
- Saint-Augustin

Indian reserves

- Essipit
- La Romaine
- Maliotenam
- Matimekosh
- Mingan
- Natashquan
- Pessamit
- Uashat

Naskapi reserved territory

- Kawawachikamach

=== Estrie ===
Regional County Municipalities

- Coaticook
- Le Granit
- Le Haut-Saint-François
- Le Val-Saint-François
- Les Sources
- Memphrémagog

Independent City

- Sherbrooke

=== Gaspésie–Îles-de-la-Madeleine ===
Regional County Municipalities

- Avignon
- Bonaventure
- La Côte-de-Gaspé
- La Haute-Gaspésie
- Le Rocher-Percé

Independent Municipalities

- Grosse-Île, Quebec
- Les Îles-de-la-Madeleine, Quebec

Indian Reserves

- Gesgapegiag, Quebec
- Listuguj, Quebec

=== Lanaudière ===
Regional County Municipalities

- D'Autray
- Joliette
- L'Assomption
- Les Moulins
- Matawinie
- Montcalm

Indian Reserve

- Manawan, Quebec

=== Laurentides ===
Regional County Municipalities

- Antoine-Labelle
- Argenteuil
- Deux-Montagnes
- La Rivière-du-Nord
- Les Laurentides
- Les Pays-d'en-Haut
- Mirabel
- Thérèse-De Blainville

Indian Reserves

- Doncaster, Quebec
- Kanesatake, Quebec

=== Laval ===
Independent City

- Laval (Laval is both a City and a Region)

=== Mauricie ===
Regional County Municipalities

- Les Chenaux
- Maskinongé
- Mékinac

Independent Cities

- La Tuque, Quebec
- Shawinigan
- Trois-Rivières

Independent Municipalities

- La Bostonnais, Quebec
- Lac-Édouard, Quebec

Indian Reserves

- Coucoucache, Quebec
- Obedjiwan, Quebec
- Wemotaci, Quebec

=== Montérégie ===
Regional County Municipalities

- Acton
- Beauharnois-Salaberry
- Brome-Missisquoi
- La Haute-Yamaska
- La Vallée-du-Richelieu
- Le Haut-Richelieu
- Le Haut-Saint-Laurent
- Les Jardins-de-Napierville
- Les Maskoutains
- Marguerite-D'Youville
- Pierre-De Saurel
- Roussillon
- Rouville
- Vaudreuil-Soulanges

Independent Cities

- Boucherville
- Brossard
- Elgin, Quebec
- Longueuil
  - Borough of Greenfield Park
  - Borough of Le Vieux-Longueuil
  - Borough of Saint-Hubert
- Saint-Bruno-de-Montarville
- Saint-Lambert, Quebec

Indian Reserves

- Akwesasne
- Kahnawake, Quebec

=== Montréal ===
Independent Cities

- Baie-d'Urfé
- Beaconsfield
- Côte Saint-Luc
- Dollard-des-Ormeaux
- Dorval
- Hampstead
- Kirkland
- L'Île-Dorval
- Montreal
  - Borough of Ahuntsic-Cartierville
  - Borough of Anjou
  - Borough of Côte-des-Neiges–Notre-Dame-de-Grâce
  - Borough of L'Île-Bizard–Sainte-Geneviève
  - Borough of LaSalle
  - Borough of Lachine
  - Borough of Le Plateau-Mont-Royal
  - Borough of Le Sud-Ouest
  - Borough of Mercier–Hochelaga-Maisonneuve
  - Borough of Montréal-Nord
  - Borough of Outremont
  - Borough of Pierrefonds-Roxboro
  - Borough of Rivière-des-Prairies–Pointe-aux-Trembles
  - Borough of Rosemont–La Petite-Patrie
  - Borough of Saint-Laurent
  - Borough of Saint-Léonard
  - Borough of Verdun
  - Borough of Ville-Marie
  - Borough of Villeray–Saint-Michel–Parc-Extension
- Montréal-Est
- Montreal West
- Mount Royal
- Pointe-Claire
- Sainte-Anne-de-Bellevue
- Westmount

Independent Village

- Senneville

=== Nord-du-Québec ===
Regional Government

- Kativik

Independent Cities

- Chapais, Quebec
- Chibougamau
- Lebel-sur-Quévillon
- Matagami

Independent Municipality

- Baie-James

Indian Reserve

- Lac-John, Quebec

Cree Villages

- Chisasibi, Quebec
- Eastmain, Quebec
- Mistissini, Quebec
- Nemaska, Quebec
- Waskaganish, Quebec
- Waswanipi, Quebec
- Wemindji, Quebec
- Whapmagoostui, Quebec

Cree Reserved Territories

- Chisasibi Reserved Territory, Quebec
- Eastmain Reserved Territory, Quebec
- Mistissini Reserved Territory, Quebec
- Nemaska Reserved Territory, Quebec
- Waskaganish Reserved Territory, Quebec
- Waswanipi Reserved Territory, Quebec
- Wemindji Reserved Territory, Quebec
- Whapmagoostui Reserved Territory, Quebec

=== Outaouais ===
Regional County Municipalities

- La Vallée-de-la-Gatineau
- Les Collines-de-l'Outaouais
- Papineau
- Pontiac

Independent City

- Gatineau

Indian Reserves

- Kitigan Zibi, Quebec
- Lac-Rapide, Quebec

=== Saguenay–Lac-Saint-Jean ===
Regional County Municipalities

- Fjord-du-Saguenay
- Lac-Saint-Jean-Est
- Domaine-du-Roy
- Maria-Chapdelaine

Independent City

- Saguenay, Quebec

Indian Reserve

- Mashteuiatsh, Quebec

== See also ==
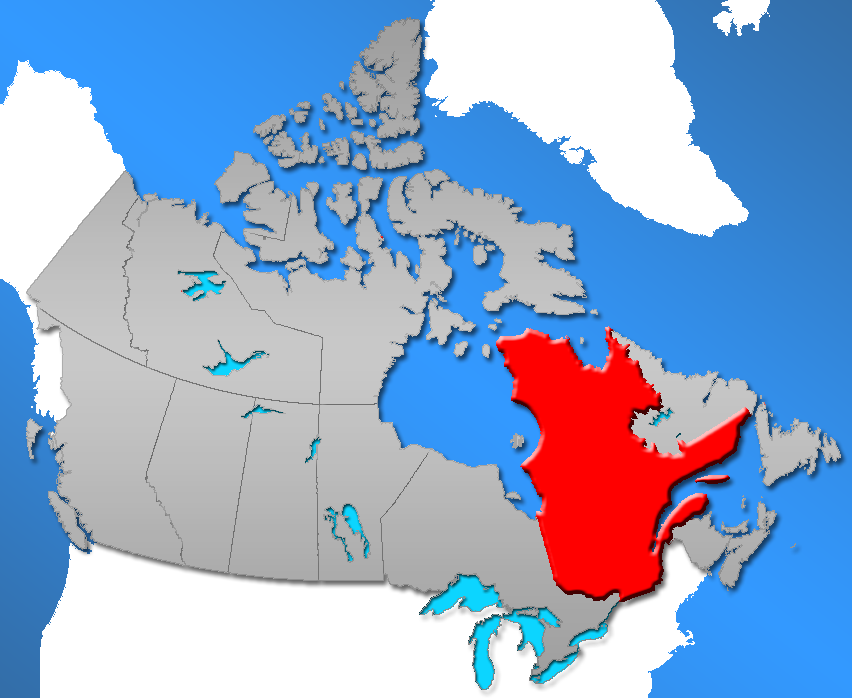
Communities in Canada's provinces and territories
- List of cities in Canada
- List of towns in Quebec
