= Grenville =

Grenville may refer to:

== People ==
- Grenville (surname)

=== People with the given name Grenville ===
- Grenville Anderson (1951–2004), Australian auto racing driver
- Grenville Astill, British archaeology at the University of Reading
- Grenville Beardsley (1898–1960), American lawyer, Attorney General of Illinois
- Grenville Berkeley (1806–1896), British politician
- Grenville Booth (1925 –1990) English footballer
- Grenville Clark (1882–1967) American lawyer and author
- Grenville Cole (1859–1924), British geologist
- Grenville Cross (born 1951), British barrister
- Grenville Davey (born 1961), English sculptor
- Grenville Dietrich (born 1960), retired Australian Rules football player
- Grenville M. Dodge (1831–1916), American Civil War officer and congressman
- Grenville C. Emery (1843–1927) American educator and author, founder of Harvard-Westlake School
- Grenville T. Emmet (1877–1937), American lawyer and diplomat
- Grenville Goodwin (c. 1898–1951), former mayor of Ottawa
- Grenville Hair (1931–1968), English footballer
- Grenville Johnston (born 1945), British accountant and Territorial Army officer
- Grenville Jones (1922–2000), Welsh political consultant and politician
- Grenville Kent (born 1965), Australian author and filmmaker
- Grenville Kleiser (1868–1953) Canadian author
- Grenville Lewis (1875–1964), American college football coach and businessman
- Grenville Mellen (1799–1841), American poet and lawyer
- Grenville Millington (born 1951), Welsh footballer
- Grenville Morris (1877–1959), Welsh footballer
- Grenville Pinto, Canadian violinist
- Grenville Turner (born 1936) British physicist
- Grenville Wilson (born 1932), English cricketer
- Grenville Dean Wilson (1833–1897), American pianist and composer
- Grenville Lindall Winthrop (1864–1943), American lawyer and art collector

== Places ==
=== Australia ===
- Cape Grenville, Queensland, Australia
- County of Grenville, Victoria, Australia
  - Electoral district of Grenville, Victoria, Australia, 1859–1927
  - Shire of Grenville, Victoria, Australia, 1861–1994

=== Canada ===
- Grenville, Quebec
- Grenville-sur-la-Rouge, Quebec
  - Grenville, Grenville-sur-la-Rouge
- Grenville Channel, a strait on the north coast of British Columbia
- Grenville County, Ontario
  - United Counties of Leeds and Grenville
  - Grenville (electoral district)
  - Grenville (provincial electoral district)
- Grenville Parish, Prince Edward Island, Canada
- Grenville Province, a geological region in eastern Canada
- Mount Grenville, British Columbia

=== Grenada ===
- Grenville, Grenada
- Grenville River

=== United States ===
- Grenville, New Mexico
- Grenville, South Dakota
- Point Grenville, a headland of Washington State

== Other uses ==
- Grenville Christian College, Ontario, Canada
- Grenville College, former boarding school in Devon, England
- Grenville College, Ballarat, former private school in Australia
- Grenville orogeny, geological mountain-building event
- Grenville Secondary School, Grenada
- HMS Grenville, several Royal Navy ships
- Grenville House, residential complex in Hong Kong
- The Two Mrs. Grenvilles, 1987 television miniseries
- Grenville steam carriage, 1875 road passenger vehicle

== See also ==
- Granville (disambiguation)
- Greenville (disambiguation)
- Grenvillite, a name given to several British political factionalists
