= Granville =

Granville may refer to:

== People and fictional characters ==
- Granville (name), including a list of people and fictional characters with the name
- Earl Granville, a title in the Peerage of Great Britain and of the UK
- Baron Granville, a title in the Peerage of England

== Places ==
=== Australia ===
- Granville, New South Wales
  - Municipality of Granville
  - Electoral district of Granville
- Granville, Queensland, a suburb of Maryborough
  - Shire of Granville, Queensland
- County of Granville, South Australia
- Granville Harbour, Tasmania

=== Canada ===
- Granville, Edmonton, Alberta
- Granville, British Columbia, former name of Vancouver
  - Granville Island, a peninsula in Vancouver
  - Granville Street, a major road in Vancouver
  - Vancouver Granville (electoral district)

=== United States ===
- Granville, Illinois
- Granville, Indiana, a former town in Wayne Township, Tippecanoe County
- Granville, Delaware County, Indiana
- Granville, Iowa
- Granville, Massachusetts
  - Granville State Forest
- Granville, Missouri
- Granville, New York, the most populous place with the name
  - Granville (village), New York
- Granville County, North Carolina
- Granville District, of the 18th century Province of North Carolina
- Granville line, a geographic feature in North Carolina
- Granville, North Dakota
- Granville, Ohio
- Granville South, Ohio
- Granville, Pennsylvania
- Granville, Tennessee
- Granville, Texas
- Granville, Vermont
  - Granville Notch, a mountain pass in Vermont
- Granville, Virginia
- Granville, West Virginia
- Granville, Wisconsin, a former town in Wisconsin and current community area in Milwaukee

=== Other countries ===
- Granville, Manche, France
  - Canton of Granville
- Granville, Jamaica
- Granville Town, now Cline Town, Freetown, Sierra Leone
- Granville, County Tyrone, Northern Ireland, UK
- Granville Fjord, Greenland

== Businesses ==
- Granville Brothers Aircraft, an American manufacturer 1929–1934
- Granville Technology Group, a former British computer company
- The Granville Hotel, Ramsgate, England

== Schools ==
- Granville Academy, Woodville, Derbyshire, UK
- Granville Christian Academy, Granville, Ohio, US
- Granville High School, Granville, Ohio, US

== Transportation ==
- Granville Airport, Washington County, New York, US
- Granville station (CTA), Chicago, Illinois, US
- Granville station (SkyTrain), Vancouver, British Columbia, Canada
- Granville railway station, Sydney, Australia
- Gare de Granville, Granville, Manche, France
- Granville Street railway station, Birmingham, UK
- Granville Road, Tsim Sha Tsui, Hong Kong

== Naval ships ==
- ARA Granville, several ships of the Argentine Navy
- USS Granville (APA-171), a US Navy attack transport

== Other uses ==
- Granville (French band)
- Granville (horse) (1933–1951)
- Granville F.C., a 19th-century Scottish football club
- US Granville, a French football club

== See also ==
- Granville Bridge (disambiguation)
- Granville Mall (disambiguation)
- Granville Station (disambiguation)
- Granville Raid, a German World War II
- Grandville (disambiguation)
- Grantville (disambiguation)
- Grenville (disambiguation)
- Troxel v. Granville, a 2000 U.S. Supreme Court case
