= List of Victory ships (G) =

This is a list of Victory ships with names beginning with G.

== Description ==
A Victory ship was a cargo ship. The cargo ships were 455 feet 3 inches (138.76 m) overall, 436 feet 6 inches (133.05 m) between perpendiculars They had a beam of 62 feet 0 inches (18.90 m), a depth of 38 feet 0 inches (11.58 m) and a draught of 28 feet 0 inches (8.53 m). They were assessed at 7,612 GRT, 4,555 NRT and 10,750 DWT.

The ships were powered by a triple expansion steam engine, driving a steam turbine via double reduction gear. This gave the ship a speed of 15.5 knots (28.7 km/h) or 16.5 knots (30.6 km/h), depending on the machinery installed.

Liberty ships had five holds. No. 1 hold was 57 feet 6 inches (17.53 m) long, with a capacity of 81,715 cubic feet (2,313.9 m^{3}), No. 2 hold was 45 feet 0 inches (13.72 m) long, with a capacity of 89,370 cubic feet (2,531 m^{3}), No. 3 hold was 78 feet 0 inches (23.77 m) long, with a capacity of 158,000 cubic feet (4,500 m^{3}), No. 4 hold was 81 feet 0 inches (24.69 m) long, with a capacity of 89,370 cubic feet (2,531 m^{3}) and No. 5 hold was 75 feet 0 inches (22.86 m) long, with a capacity of 81,575 cubic feet (2,309.9 m^{3}).

In wartime service, they carried a crew of 62, plus 28 gunners. The ships carried four lifeboats. Two were powered, with a capacity of 27 people and two were unpowered, with a capacity of 29 people.

== Gage ==
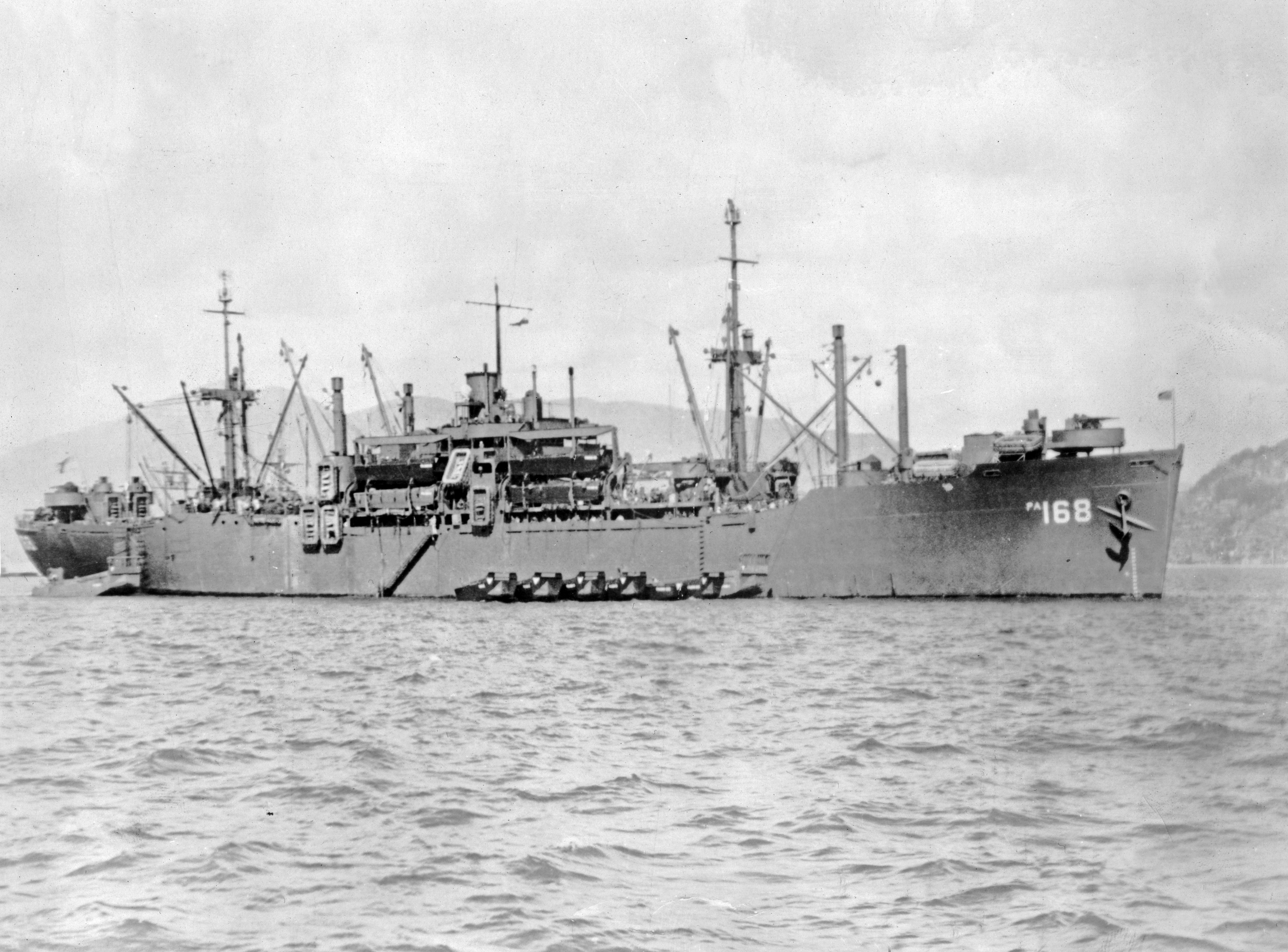
USS Gage

Gage was built by Oregon Shipbuilding Corporation, Portland, Oregon. Her keel was laid on 13 August 1944. She was launched on 14 October and delivered on 12 November. Built for the United States Navy. Decommissioned in 1946. To the United States Maritime Administration in 1958 and laid up in the James River. She was scrapped at Brownsville, Texas in July 2009.

== Gainesville Victory ==
Gainesville Victory was built by California Shipbuilding Corporation, Terminal Island, Los Angeles, California. Her keel was laid on 11 April 1944. She was launched on 9 June and delivered on 22 July. Built for the War Shipping Administration (WSA), she was operated under the management of Matson Navigation Co. Laid up at Beaumont, Texas in 1948. She was scrapped at Alang, India in 1994.

== Gallatin ==
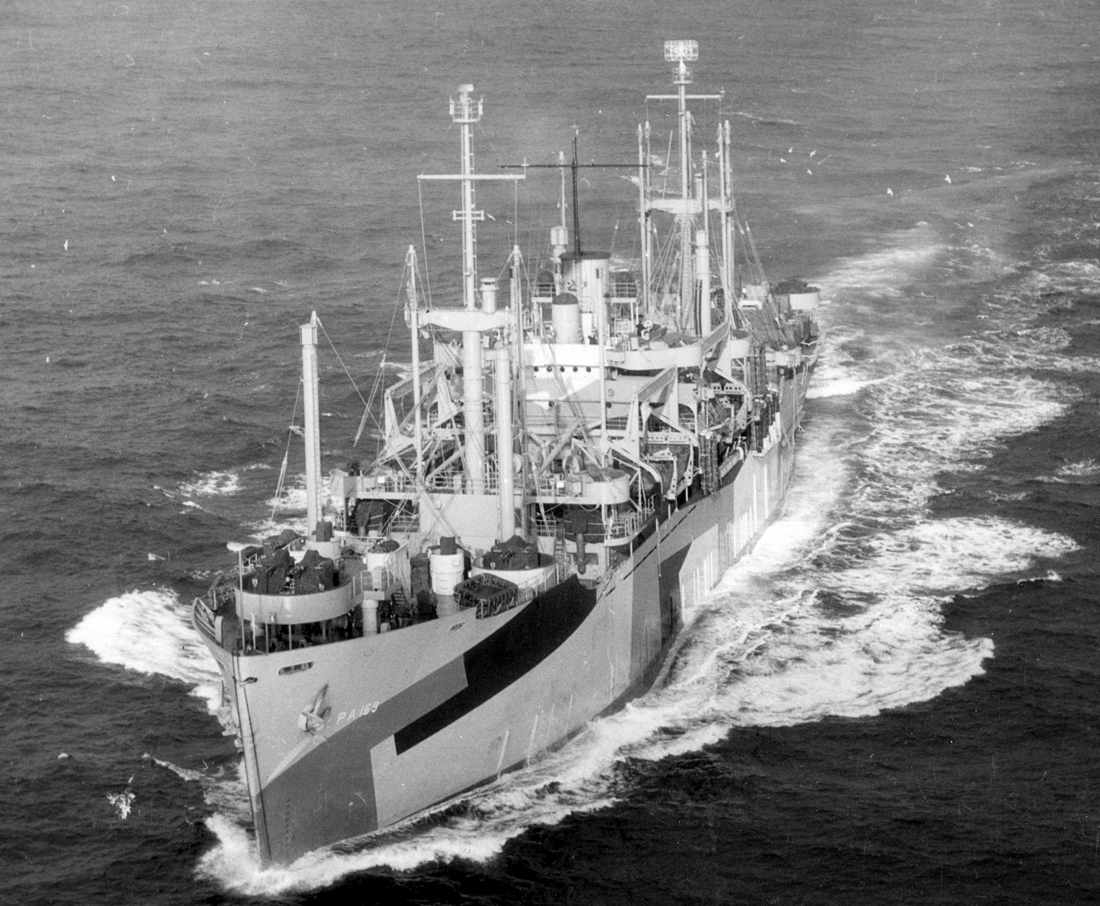
USS Gallatin

Gallatin was built by Oregon Shipbuilding Corporation. Her keel was laid on 13 August 1944. She was launched on 17 October and delivered on 15 November. Built for the United States Navy. To the United States Maritime Commission (USMC) in 1946 and laid up in the James River. She was scrapped in 2004.

== Georgetown Victory ==
Georgetown Victory was a troop transport built by Bethlehem Fairfield Shipyard, Baltimore, Maryland. Her keel was laid on 8 March 1945. She was launched on 28 April and delivered on 22 May. Built for the WSA, she was operated under the management of American Export Line. She struck rocks in Strangford Lough, United Kingdom on 30 April 1946 whilst on a voyage from Sydney, Australia to Glasgow, United Kingdom and was wrecked. The wreck was subsequently salvaged and scrapped at Troon, United Kingdom in 1951.

== Glynn ==
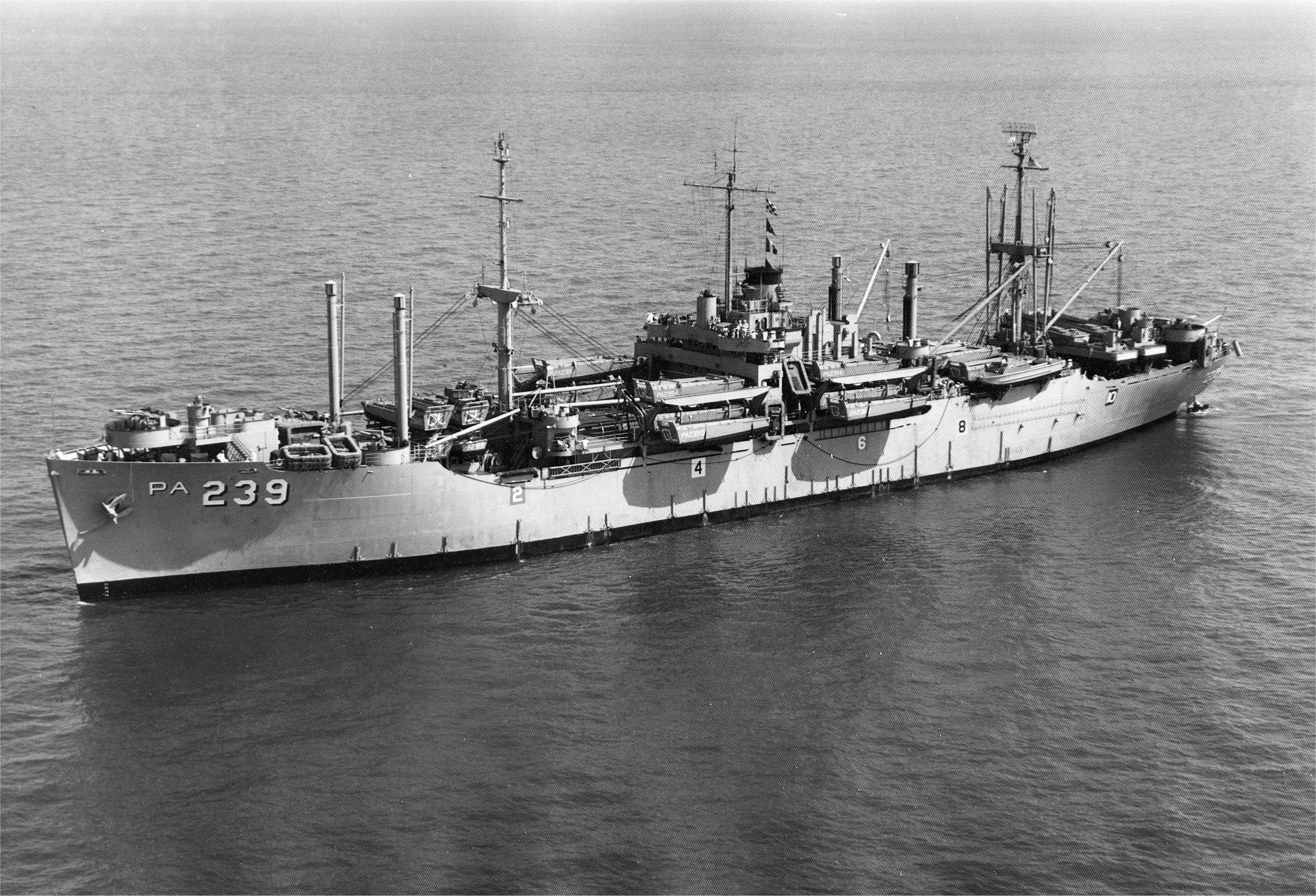
USS Glynn

Glynn was built by Oregon Shipbuilding Corporation. Her keel was laid on 18 June 1945. She was launched on 9 August and delivered on 29 October. Built for the United States Navy. Decommissioned in 1946 and laid up in reserve. Recommissioned in 1951. Decommissioned in 1955 and laid up in reserve. to the United States Maritime Administration in 1960 and laid up in the James River. She was scrapped at Barcelona, Spain in 1985.

== Gonzaga Victory ==
Gonzaga Victory was built by Oregon Shipbuilding Corporation. Her keel was laid on 17 April 1945. She was launched on 2 June and delivered on 29 June. Built for the WSA, she was operated under the management of Alaska Steamship Company. Sold in 1946 to N.V. Vereenigde Nederlandsche Scheepvaarts Maatschappij, Den Haag, Netherlands and renamed Groote Kerk. She was scrapped at Whampoa, Hong Kong in August 1970.

== Gosper ==
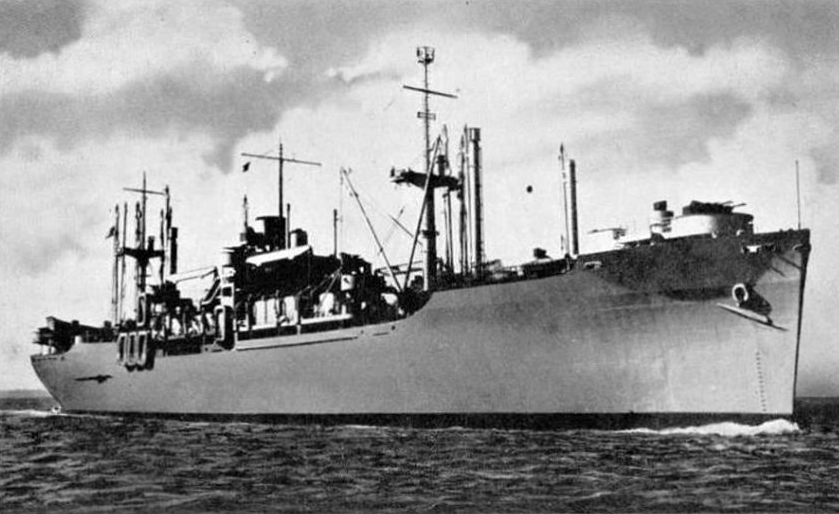
USS Gosper

Gosper was built by Oregon Shipbuilding Corporation. Her keel was laid on 29 August 1944. She was launched on 20 October and delivered on 18 November. Built for the United States Navy. To the USMC in 1946 and laid up in the James River. She was scrapped at Castellón de la Plana, Spain in 1974.

== Goucher Victory ==
Goucher Victory was built by Bethlehem Fairfield Shipyard. Her keel was laid on 18 April 1945. She was launched on 2 June and delivered on 30 June. Built for the WSA, she was operated under the management of Union Sulphur Company. To the United States Army Transportation Corps in 1946 and renamed Sgt. Howard E. Woodford. To the United States Navy in 1950, operated by the Military Sea Transportation Service (MSTS). To the United States Department of Commerce in 1952. Laid up at Olympia, Washington. She was scrapped at Taipei, Taiwan in February 1972.

== Grange Victory ==
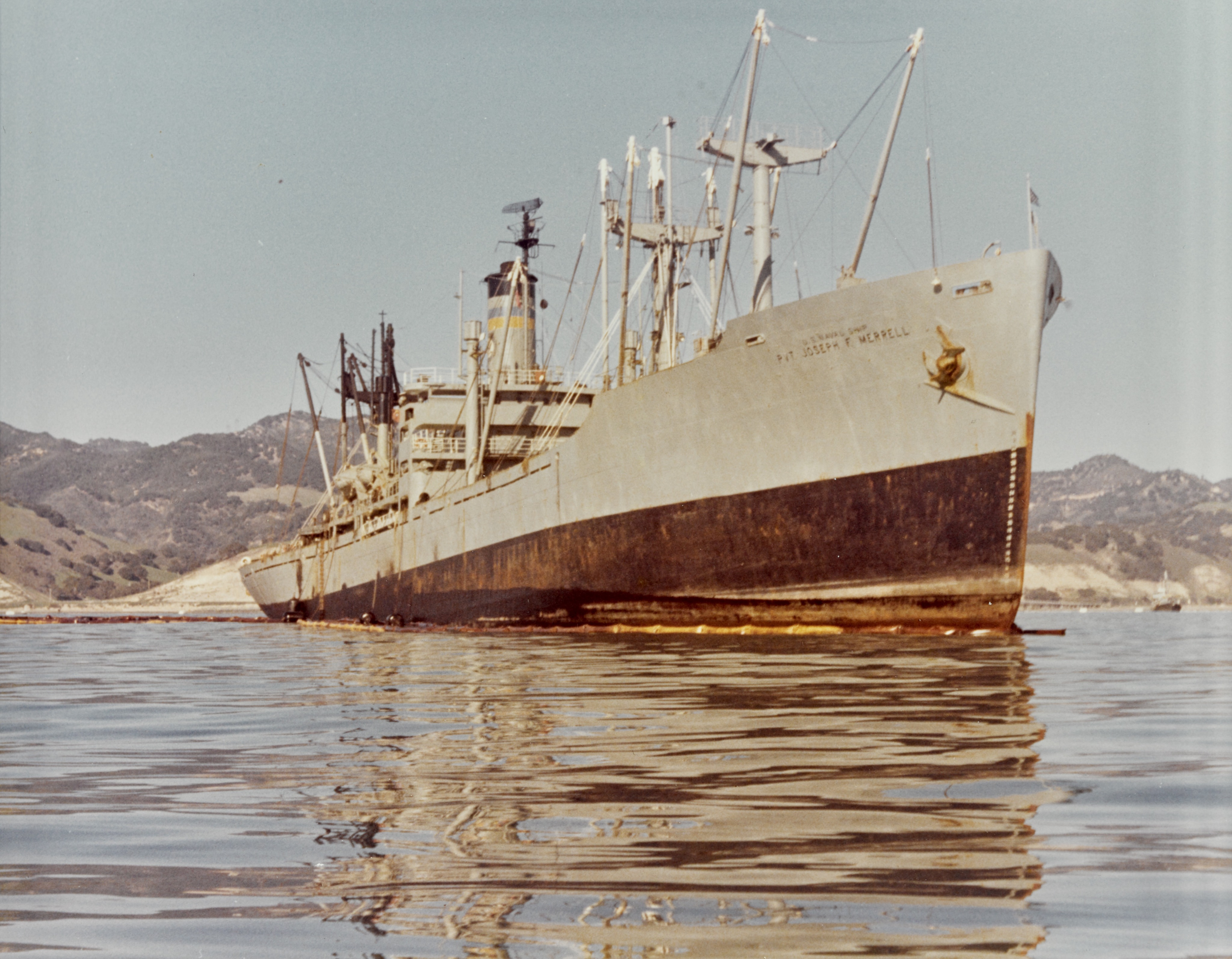
USNS Pvt. Joseph F. Merrell

Grange Victory was built by California Shipbuilding Corporation. Her keel was laid on 3 May 1944. She was launched on 28 June and delivered on 7 August. Built for the WSA, she was operated under the management of Isthmian Steamship Company. To the United States Army Transportation Corps in 1946 and renamed Pvt. Joseph F. Merrell. To the United States Navy in 1950, operated by the MSTS. She was scrapped at Kaohsiung, Taiwan in 1974.

== Granville ==
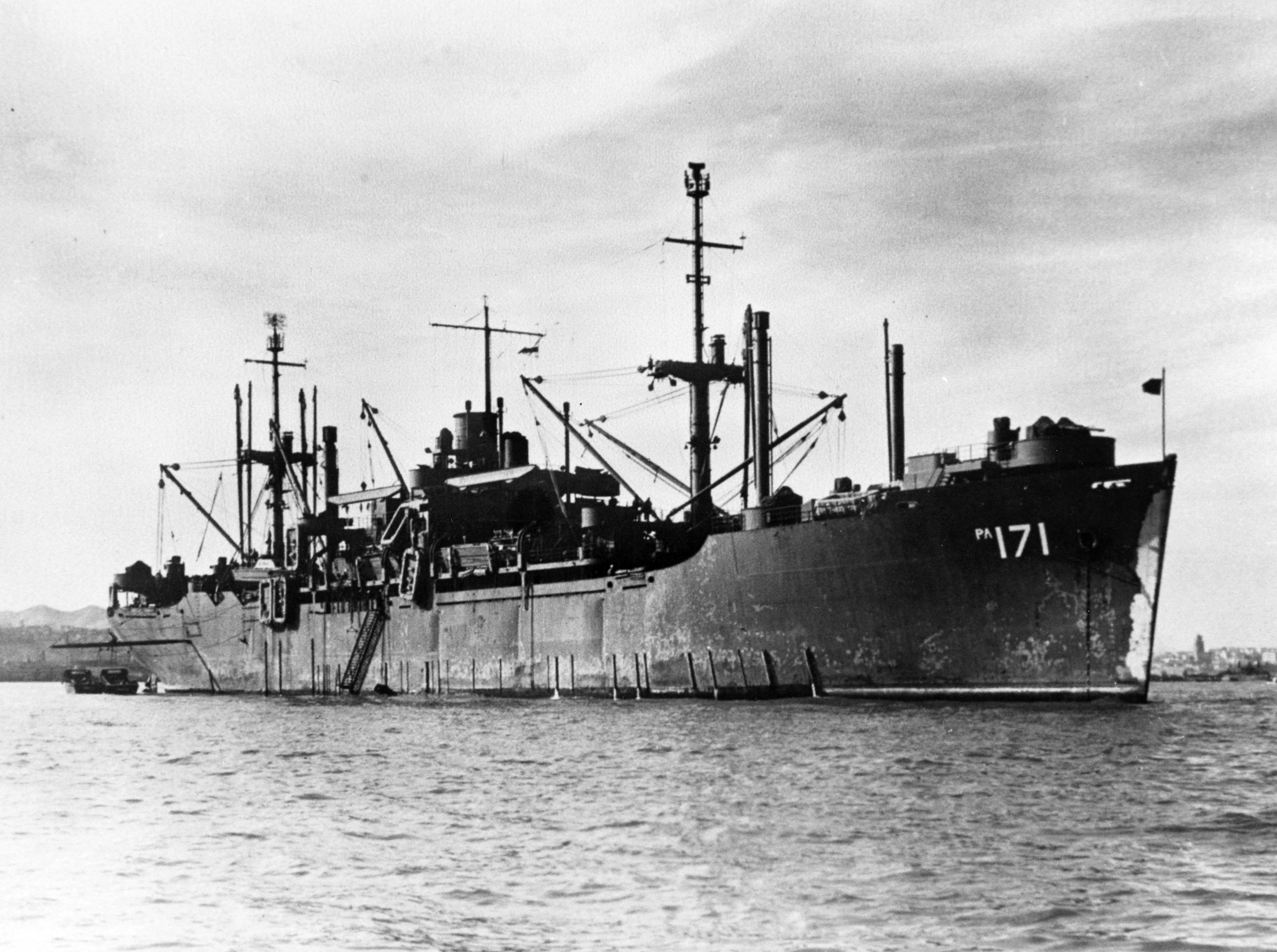
USS Granville

Granville was built by Oregon Shipbuilding Corporation. Her keel was laid on 4 September 1944. She was launched on 23 October and delivered on 21 November. Built for the United States Navy. To the USMC in 1946 and laid up in the James River. She was sold to New York shipbreakers in April 1973.

== Great Falls Victory ==
Great Falls Victory was built by Permanente Metals Corporation, Richmond, California. Her keel was laid on 4 June 1945. She was launched on 14 July and delivered on 20 August. Built for the WSA, she was operated under the management of International Freighting Corporation. Laid up at Beaumont in 1949. Returned to service in 1966 due to the Vietnam War. Operated under the management of American Mail Line. Laid up in Suisun Bay in 1973. She was scrapped at Kaohsiung in 1984.

== Greece Victory ==
Greece Victory was built by California Shipbuilding Corporation. Her keel was laid on 7 December 1943. She was launched on 3 February 1944 and delivered on 14 April. Built for the WSA, she was operated under the management of Grace Line Inc. Laid up at Mobile, Alabama in 1948. Later transferred to Olympia. She was scrapped at Portland, Oregon in April 1972.

== Greeley Victory ==
Greeley Victory was built by Permanente Metals Corporation. Her keel was laid on 24 May 1945. She was launched on 4 July and delivered on 8 August. Built for the WSA, she was operated under the management of Seas Shipping Co. Laid up at Mobile in 1948. Returned to service in 1966 due to the Vietnam War. Operated under the management of Pacific Far East Line. Laid up in the James River in 1973. She was scrapped at Kaohsiung in 1984.

== Green Bay Victory ==
Green Bay Victory was built by Oregon Shipbuilding Corporation. Her keel was laid on 2 December 1944. She was launched on 9 January 1945 and delivered on 29 January. Built for the WSA, she was operated under the management of United States Lines. Laid up in the Hudson River in 1949. Later transferred to the James River. She was scrapped at Vigo, Spain in 1985.

== Greenville Victory ==
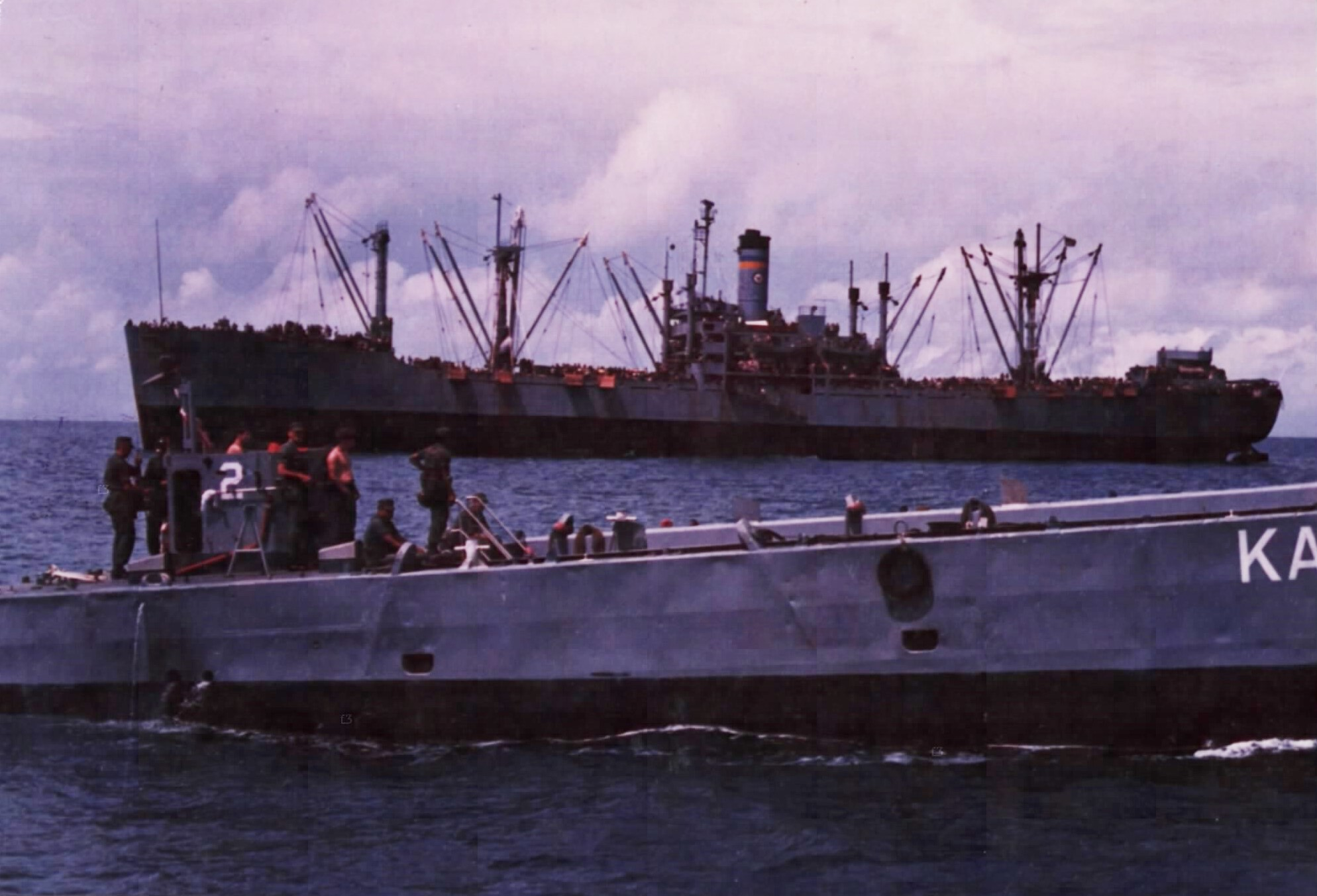
USNS Greenville Victory

Greenville Victory was built by California Shipbuilding Corporation. Her keel was laid on 21 March 1944. She was launched on 24 May and delivered on 8 July. Built for the WSA, she was operated under the management of Seas Shipping Co. Chartered to the United States Army Transportation Corps in 1948. To the United States Navy in 1950, operated by the MSTS. To the United States Maritime Administration in 1976, laid up in the James River. She was scrapped at Brownsville in 1983.

== Gretna Victory ==
Gretna Victory was built by Permanente Metals Corporation. Her keel was laid on 28 November 1944. She was launched on 20 January 1945 and delivered on 14 February. Built for the WSA, she was operated under the management of Hammond Shipping Company. Laid up at Beaumont in 1949. Later transferred to the James River. She was scrapped at Kaohsiung in 1984.

== Grimes ==
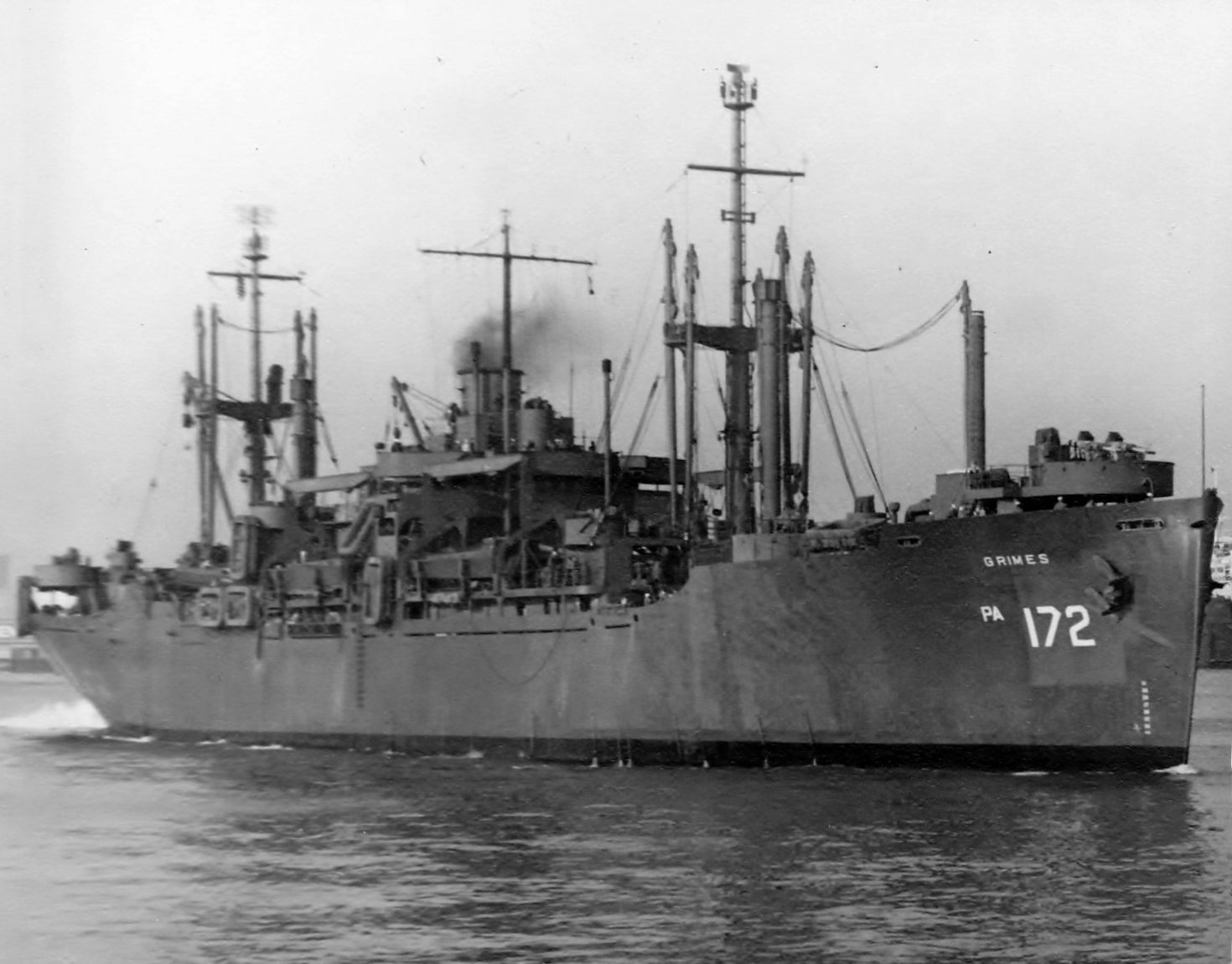
USS Grimes

Grimes was built by Oregon Shipbuilding Corporation. Her keel was laid on 8 September 1944. She was launched on 27 October and delivered on 23 November. Built for the United States Navy. Decommissioned in 1946 and laid up in reserve. To the United States Maritime Administration in 1959 and laid up at Wilmington, North Carolina. She was scrapped in 1974.

== Grinnell Victory ==
Grinnell Victory was built by Permanente Metals Corporation. Her keel was laid on 31 December 1944. She was launched on 14 February 1945 and delivered on 10 March. Built for the WSA, she was operated under the management of Hammond Shipping Company. Laid up in the James River in 1947. Returned to service in 1966 due to the Vietnam War. Operated under the management of Pacific Far East Line. Laid up at Beaumont in 1973. She was scrapped at Brownsville in 1985.

== Grove City Victory ==
Grove City Victory was built by Permanente Metals Corporation. Her keel was laid on 17 March 1945. She was launched on 28 April and delivered on 23 May. Built for the WSA, she was operated under the management of Alcoa Steamship Company. Laid up at Astoria, Washington in 1947. Returned to service in 1966 due to the Vietnam War. Operated under the management of States Steamship Co. Laid up in Suisun Bay in 1973. She was scrapped in 1993.

== Guatemala Victory ==
Guatemala Victory was built by Permanente Metals Corporation. Her keel was laid on 1 May 1944. She was launched on 13 July and delivered on 6 September. Built for the WSA, she was operated under the management of American-Hawaiian Steamship Company. Sold in 1946 to Holland-Amerika Lijn, Rotterdam, Netherlands and renamed Aalsdijk. Renamed Aalsdyk in 1954. Sold in 1960 to Maritime Foundation (Overseas) Ltd., Bermuda and renamed Hongkong Manufacturer. Sold in 1961 to Overseas Maritime Co, Monrovia, Liberia and renamed Hongkong Clipper. She was scrapped in Taiwan in 1974.

== Gustavus Victory ==
Gustavus Victory was a troop transport built by Bethlehem Fairfield Shipyard. Her keel was laid on 25 May 1945. She was launched on 9 July and delivered on 10 August. Built for the WSA, she was operated under the management of A. L. Burbank & Company, Ltd. Sold in 1947 to Compana Argentina de Navegacion Dodero, Buenos Aires, Argentina and renamed Santa Fe. Sold in 1949 to Flota Argentina de Navegacion de Ultramar, Buenos Aires. Sold in 1961 to Empresa Lineas Maritima Argentinas, Buenos Aires. She was scrapped at Campana, Argentina in 1974.
