= Greenville micropolitan area =

The Greenville micropolitan area may refer to:

- The Greenville, Mississippi micropolitan area, United States
- The Greenville, Ohio micropolitan area, United States

== See also ==
- Greenville metropolitan area (disambiguation)
- Greenville (disambiguation)
