= Granville (name) =

Granville is an English surname, a middle name, and a given name. Notable people with the name include:

== People with the surname ==
- Granville (surname)

== People with the middle name ==
- William Granville Cochran (1844–1932), American judge and politician

== People with the given name ==
- Granville Pearl Aikman (1858–1923), American judge
- Granville Bantock (1868–1946), British composer of classical music.
- Granville Bates (1882–1940), American character actor and bit player
- Granville Smith Crockett (1799–c. 1838–1846), American politician from Tennessee
- Granville Wilbur "Granny" Hamner (1927–1993), American professional baseball player
- Granville Henderson Oury, 19th century American politician, lawyer, judge, soldier, and miner
- Granville Hicks (1901–1982), American literary figure
- Granville Perkins (1830–1895), American artist and illustrator
- Granville Sharp (1735–1813), British scholar involved in the abolitionist movement
- Granville Saxton (1948–c.), British actor.
- Granville Woods (1856–1910), African-American inventor
- Granville Stanley Hall (1846–1924), American psychologist who received the first psychology doctorate in the United States
- Granville Ryrie (1865–1937) Australian general, politician, and High Commissioner to the United Kingdom
- Oral Roberts (1918–2009), American prominent televangelist
- Granville Rodrigo (1958–1999), Sri Lankan Sinhala actor and vocalist

== Fictional characters ==
- Granville (Open All Hours), played by David Jason
- Professor Granville, from Big Hero 6: The Series
- Granville Sawyer, from Miracle on 34th Street (1947), played by Porter Hall

== See also ==
- Granville (disambiguation)
- Grenville (disambiguation)
