= Greenville =

Greenville commonly refers to:

- Greenville, North Carolina, the twelfth-most populous city in North Carolina
- Greenville, South Carolina, the sixth-most populous city in South Carolina

Greenville may also refer to:

== Canada ==
- Laxgalts'ap, British Columbia, formerly named Greenville
- Greenville, Nova Scotia, in Yarmouth County
- Greenville Station, Nova Scotia, in Cumberland County
- Lower Greenville, Nova Scotia, in Cumberland County

== United States ==
- Greenville, Alabama
- Greenville, California, in Plumas County
- Greenville, Yuba County, California
- Greenville, Delaware
- Greenville, Florida
- Greenville, Georgia
- Greenville, Illinois
  - Greenville University
  - Federal Correctional Institution, Greenville
- Greenville, Indiana, in Floyd County
- Greenville, Wells County, Indiana
- Greenville, Iowa
- Greenville, Kentucky
- Manchester, Kentucky, which was founded as Greenville
- Greenville, Maine, a town
  - Greenville (CDP), Maine, a census-designated place within the town
- Greenville, Massachusetts
- Greenville, Michigan
- Greenville, Mississippi, ghost town known as "Old Greenville" in Jefferson County
- Greenville, Mississippi, in Washington County
- Greenville, Missouri
- Greenville, New Hampshire, a town
  - Greenville (CDP), New Hampshire, a census-designated place within the town
- Greenville, Jersey City, New Jersey
- Greenville, New York (disambiguation)
- Greenville, Ohio
- Greenville, Oklahoma
- Greenville, Oregon (disambiguation)
- Greenville, Pennsylvania
- Greenville Township, Somerset County, Pennsylvania
- Greenville, Rhode Island
- Greenville, Texas
- Greenville, Utah
- Greenville, Virginia
- Greenville (Raccoon's Ford, Virginia), a historic plantation home
- Greenville, Wisconsin, a town
  - Greenville (community), Wisconsin, an unincorporated community in the town of Greenville
- Greencastle, West Virginia, also called Greenville
- Greenville metropolitan area (disambiguation), multiple metropolitan areas in the U.S. with the same name

== Liberia ==
- Greenville, Liberia

== See also ==
- Greendale (disambiguation)
- Greeneville (disambiguation)
- Greensville (disambiguation)
- Grenville (disambiguation)
- List of places named for Nathanael Greene
