= Grandville =

Grandville may refer to:

== Places ==
- Grandville, Aube, a commune in France
- Grandville, Michigan, a city in the United States
- Grandville, Wallonia, a district of Oreye, Belgium
- La Grandville, a commune in Ardennes, France

== Other uses ==
- Grandville (comics), a 2009 series of graphic novels by Bryan Talbot
  - Grandville (graphic novel)
- The pseudonym of Jean Ignace Isidore Gérard Grandville (1803–1847), French caricaturist

== See also ==
- Granville (disambiguation)
