= Christmas Evans =

Welsh nonconformist minister

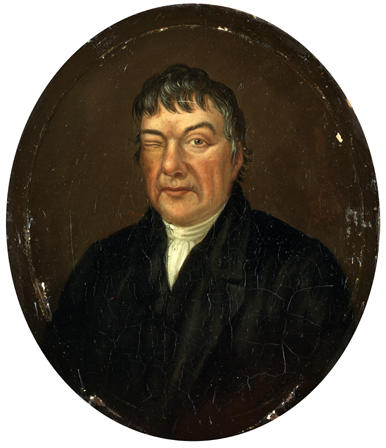
Portrait of Christmas Evans by William Roos, 1835.

Christmas Evans (25 December 1766 – 19 July 1838) was a Welsh nonconformist minister, who, according to D. M. Lloyd-Jones, was "the greatest preacher that the Baptists have ever had in Great Britain."

== Life ==
Evans was born near the village of Llandysul, Cardiganshire. His father, a shoemaker, died early, and the boy grew up as an illiterate farm labourer. At the age of seventeen, he became the servant of a Presbyterian minister, David Davies. Under the influence of a contemporary religious revival, he learned to read and write in English and Welsh. The itinerant Calvinistic Methodist preachers and the members of the Baptist church at Llandyssul further influenced him, and he soon joined the latter denomination.

In 1789 he went into North Wales as a preacher and settled for two years on the remote Llŷn Peninsula, Caernarfonshire, from where he moved to Llangefni in Anglesey. Here, on a stipend of £17 a year, supplemented by the selling of tracts, he built up a strong Baptist community, modelling his organization to some extent on that of the Calvinistic Methodists. Many new chapels were built, the money being collected on preaching tours which Evans undertook in South Wales. In 1826 Evans accepted an invitation from a congregation at Caerphilly, where he remained for two years, moving on from there in 1828 to Cardiff. In 1832, in response to urgent calls from the north, he settled in Caernarfon and again undertook the old work of building and collecting. He was also noted to have sermons in the village of Llantwit Major. He was taken ill on a tour in South Wales, in 1838, and died at Swansea.

In spite of his early disadvantages and personal disfigurement (he had lost an eye in a youthful brawl), Evans was a remarkably powerful preacher that was said to have been 7 feet tall. To a natural aptitude for this calling he united a nimble mind and an inquiring spirit; his character was simple, his piety humble and his faith fervently evangelical. For a time he came under Sandemanian influence, and when the Wesleyans entered Wales he took the Calvinist side in the bitter controversies that were frequent between 1800 and 1810. His chief characteristic was a vivid and affluent imagination, which absorbed and controlled his other abilities, and earned for him the name "The Bunyan of Wales". His sermons are entirely free from sectarianism, being intended merely to enlighten the understanding and warm the heart, and therefore well adapted to Christians in general.

In 1909 a seven volume work compiled by Grenville Kleiser entitled 'The World's Great Sermons' included Evans' famous graveyard sermon 'The World As A Graveyard' and was the only sermon in the collection by a Welsh preacher and one of the few by a Baptist.

== Death and legacy ==
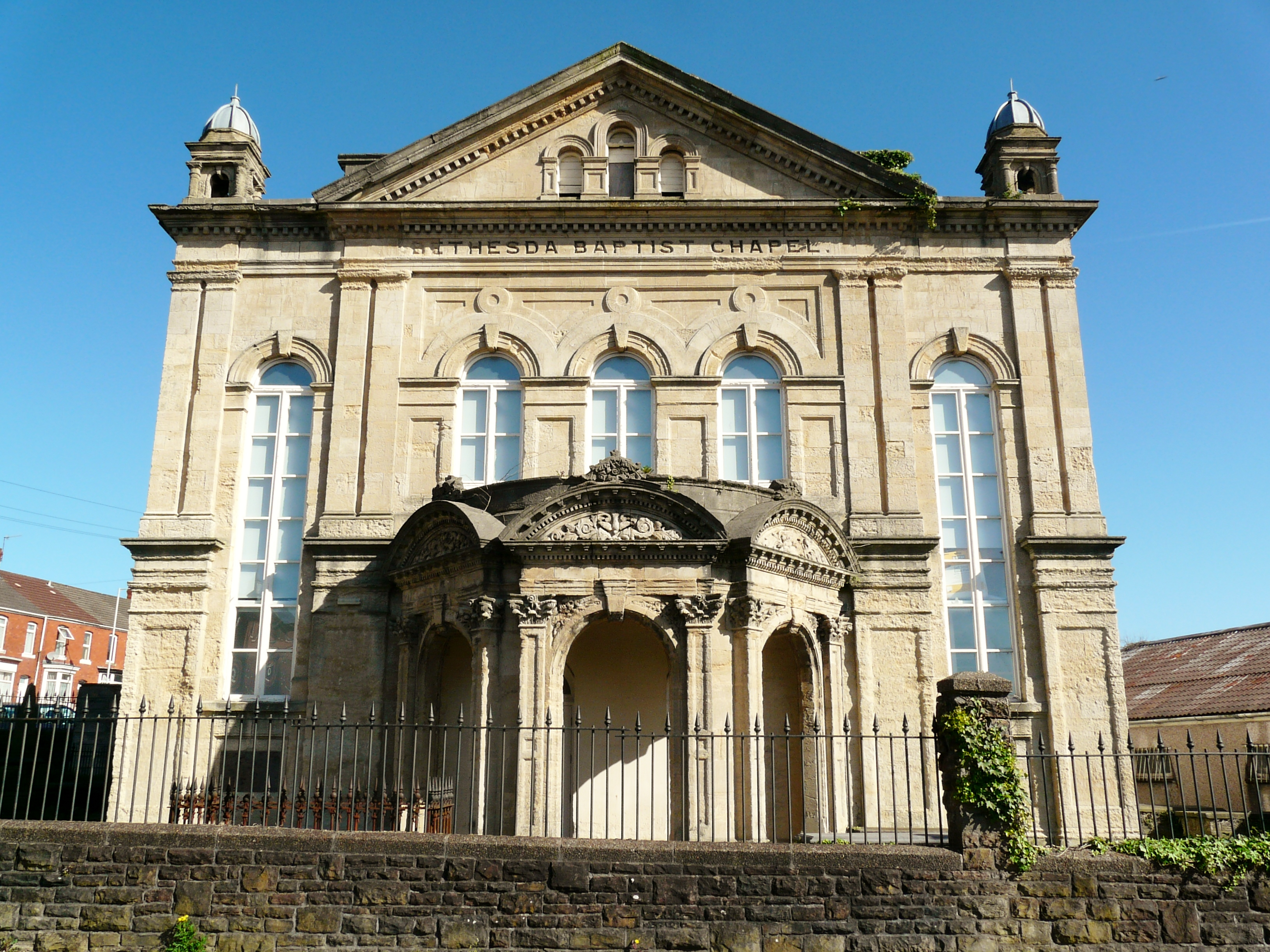
Evans' burial place - Bethesda Baptist Chapel, Swansea

He died in 1838, at the house of Daniel Davies (1797-1876) at Swansea, while on a preaching tour in South Wales, and was buried in the grounds of Swansea's Bethesda Chapel. His funeral was one of the largest ever attended in the country. It is believed to bring good luck if you kiss the headstone of Christmas Evans, making it the Swansea version of the Blarney Stone.

Evans was described by D. M. Lloyd-Jones as "the greatest preacher that the Baptists have ever had in Great Britain".

== Works ==
His works were edited by Owen Davies, in three volumes, and were published in Caernarvon between 1895 and 1897.
