= Granville Hall =

Granville Hall may refer to:

- Granville D. Hall (1837–1934), American journalist, businessman and politician
- G. Stanley Hall (1846–1924), American psychologist and educator
- USS Granville S. Hall (YAG-40), an American Liberty ship

== See also ==
- Granville Town Hall, historic building in Sydney, Australia
- Granville Mall (disambiguation)
- Granville O. Haller
