= G'ville =

G'ville may refer to:

- Gladesville, New South Wales
- Greenville (disambiguation)
