= Grenville (surname) =

Grenville is a surname, and may refer to:

- Anne Grenville, Baroness Grenville (1772–1864), English noblewoman and author
- Bevil Grenville (1596–1643), English soldier and politician
- Bernard Grenville (1567–1636), English politician
- Bruce Grenville, pseudonym of Bruce Henderson (philatelist) (born 1950), New Zealand anarchist and hoaxer
- Elizabeth Grenville (1719–1769), British artist and writer, wife of Prime Minister George Grenville
- George Grenville (1712–1770), British Prime Minister 1763–1765
- George Grenville (fl. 1571–1572), English Member of Parliament
- George Grenville (died 1595), English Member of Parliament
- George Neville-Grenville (1789–1854), English Anglican cleric, Dean of Windsor
- George Nugent-Grenville, 2nd Baron Nugent (1789–1850), British politician
- George Nugent-Temple-Grenville, 1st Marquess of Buckingham (1753–1813), British politician
- Georgina Grenville (born 1975), South African fashion model
- Henry Grenville (1717–1784), British diplomat and politician
- Hester Grenville, 1st Countess Temple (c.1690–1752), English noblewoman
- Honor Grenville, Viscountess Lisle, (c.1493–5–1566), figure of the Lisle Papers
- Kate Grenville (born 1950), Australian author
- James Grenville (1715–1783), British politician
- James Grenville, 1st Baron Glastonbury (1742–1825), British politician
- Jane Grenville (born 1958), British archaeologist and academic
- Jennifer Howard-Grenville, Canadian-British organisational scientist
- John Grenville (1928–2011), German-British historian
- John Grenville (MP for Exeter) (by 1506 – 1562 or later), English Member of Parliament
- Mark Grenville (born 1963), Guyanese cricketer
- Mary Freeman-Grenville, 12th Lady Kinloss (1922–2012), British peeress
- Mary Morgan-Grenville, 11th Lady Kinloss (1852–1944), British peeress
- Ralph Neville-Grenville (1817–1886), British politician
- Richard Grenville (1542–1591), English sailor and soldier
- Richard de Grenville (died after 1142), one of the Twelve Knights of Glamorgan
- Richard Grenville (died 1550), English Member of Parliament for Cornwall
- Richard Grenville (died 1577 or 1578), English Member of Parliament for Newport (Cornwall) and Dunheved
- Richard Grenville (1678–1727), British politician
- Richard Grenville (British Army officer) (1742–1823), British Army general
- Sir Richard Grenville, 1st Baronet (1600–1658), Royalist leader in the English Civil War
- Richard Grenville-Temple, 2nd Earl Temple (1711–1779), British politician
- Teresa Freeman-Grenville, 13th Lady Kinloss (born 1957), British peeress
- Thomas Grenville (1755–1846), British politician and bibliophile
- Thomas Grenville (died 1513), High Sheriff of Cornwall
- Thomas Grenville (Royal Navy officer) (1719–1747), British politician and naval officer
- Tina Grenville, New Zealand actor, model, presenter and writer
- William Grenville, 1st Baron Grenville (1759–1834), British Prime Minister 1806–1807

== See also ==
- Temple-Nugent-Brydges-Chandos-Grenville
- Greville (surname)
- Granville (surname)
