= Thomas Grenville (disambiguation) =

Thomas Grenville (1755–1846) was a British politician and bibliophile.

Thomas Grenville may also refer to:

- Thomas Grenville (Royal Navy officer) (1719–1747), British politician and naval officer
- Sir Thomas Grenville (died 1513), Sheriff of Cornwall

== See also ==
- Grenville (disambiguation)
