= Greeneville (disambiguation) =

Greeneville may refer to the following places in the United States:

- Greeneville (Norwich, Connecticut), a historic neighborhood in the city of Norwich, Connecticut.
- Greeneville, Tennessee, a town in and the county seat of Greene County, Tennessee.

== See also ==
- Greenville (disambiguation)
- List of places named for Nathanael Greene
