= Granville (surname) =

Granville is a surname, and may refer to:

- Alexander Granville (1874–1929), British physician and colonial administrator
- Andrew Granville (born 1962), British mathematician
- Arthur Granville (1912–1987), Welsh footballer
- Augustus Granville (1783–1872), Italian physician, writer and patriot
- Bernard Granville (1888–1936), American actor, singer and minstrel show performer
- Bernard Granville (MP died 1701) (1631–1701), English courtier and Member of Parliament
- Bevil Granville (died 1706), English soldier and governor of Barbados
- Billy Granville (born 1974), American football player
- Bonita Granville (1923–1988), American film actress and TV producer
- Brigitte Granville (born 1957), Anglo-French economist
- Charles Granville (born 1867), English book publisher
- Charles Granville, 2nd Earl of Bath (1661–1701), English soldier, politician, diplomat and courtier
- Charlotte Granville (1860–1942), British actress
- Christine Granville, cover name of Krystyna Skarbek (1908–1952), Polish agent of the British Special Operations Executive
- Damiete Charles Granville (born 1988), Nigerian model
- Danny Granville (born 1975), English footballer and coach
- Denis Granville (1637–1703), English non-juring cleric, Dean of Durham and Jacobite exile
- Edgar Granville, Baron Granville of Eye (1898–1998), British politician
- Evelyn Boyd Granville (1924–2023), mathematician, computing pioneer and programmer for the Apollo program
- Fred LeRoy Granville (1896–1932), English photographer
- George Granville, 1st Baron Lansdowne (1666–1735), English poet, playwright, and politician
- Harley Granville-Barker (1877–1946) English actor-manager, director, producer, critic and playwright
- Jake Granville (born 1989), Australian rugby league footballer
- Jane Granville, Countess of Bath (1630–1692), wife of John Granville, 1st Earl of Bath
- Jean-Jacques de Granville (1943–2022), French and French Guianan botanist, museum curator and researcher
- John Granville (diplomat) (1974–2008), diplomat with the United States Agency for International Development
- John Granville (footballer) (born 1956), Tobagonian football goalkeeper
- John Granville, 1st Earl of Bath (1628–1701), English Royalist soldier and statesman during the Civil War
- John Granville, 1st Baron Granville of Potheridge (1665–1707), English soldier, landowner and politician
- Jonathas Granville (1785–1839), Haitian soldier and diplomat
- Joseph Granville (1923–2013), American financial writer and investment speaker
- Joseph Mortimer Granville (1833–1900), English physician, author and inventor
- Laura Granville (born 1981), American tennis player
- Michael Granville (born 1978), American middle-distance runner
- Philip Granville (1894–1954), Canadian racewalker
- Ralph Granville (born 1931), Scottish footballer
- Ranulf de Glanvill (or Glanvil, Glanville, Granville, etc., died 1190), Chief Justiciar of England during the reign of King Henry II (1154–89)
- Richard Granville (1907–1972), English cricketer
- Roy Granville (1910–1986), American sound engineer
- Sydney Granville (1880–1959), British singer and actor
- Timothy Granville-Chapman (born 1947), British Army officer
- Walter Granville-Smith (1870–1938), American illustrator and painter
- William Granville (civil servant) (1785–1864), British colonial administrator
- William Anthony Granville (1863–1943), American mathematician and college president
- William Granville, 3rd Earl of Bath (1692–1711), British peer

== See also ==
- Grenville (surname)
