= William Roos (artist) =

British artist and engraver (1808–1878)

William Roos (1808 – 4 July 1878) was a Welsh artist and engraver. Several of Roos' portraits, mainly of notable Welsh figures, are owned by the National Library of Wales.

== Life history ==
Roos was born in 1808 to Thomas and Mary Roose of Bodgadfa, Amlwch on the Isle of Anglesey. Although no exact date of birth exists, he was christened on 30 April 1808. In 1858, at the National Eisteddfod at Llangollen, Roos' paintings The Death of Owen Glyndwr and The Death of Captain Wynn at Alma won the second place prize. Although based in Wales, he spent periods of time in London and frequently travelled in order to sustain his portrait work.

A popular portrait painter, several of his portraits are now held at the National Museum of Wales, including oils of preacher Christmas Evans, Thomas Charles, John Cox, and poet Talhaiarn. The Museum also houses several mezzotints and lithograph portraits by him.

=== Gallery ===
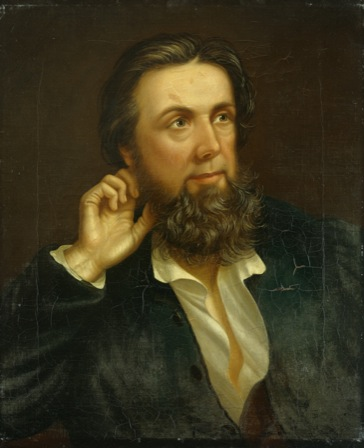
Talhaiarn (1864), National Museum Cardiff

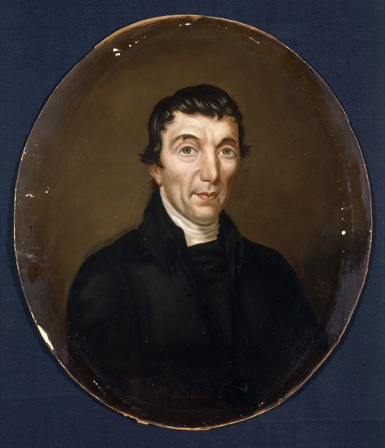
John Elias (1839), National Museum Cardiff

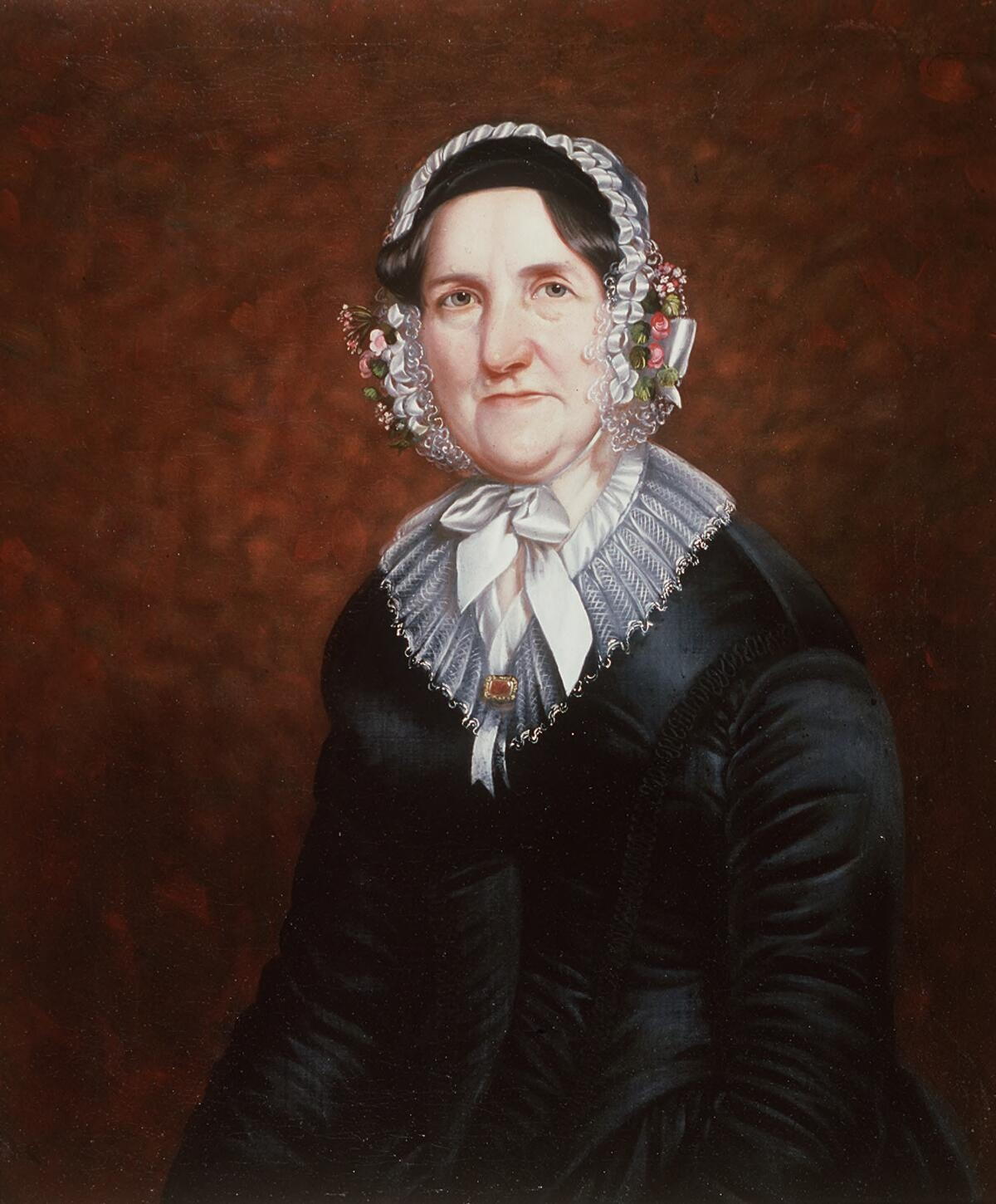
Margaret Mary Thomas (1847), National Library of Wales

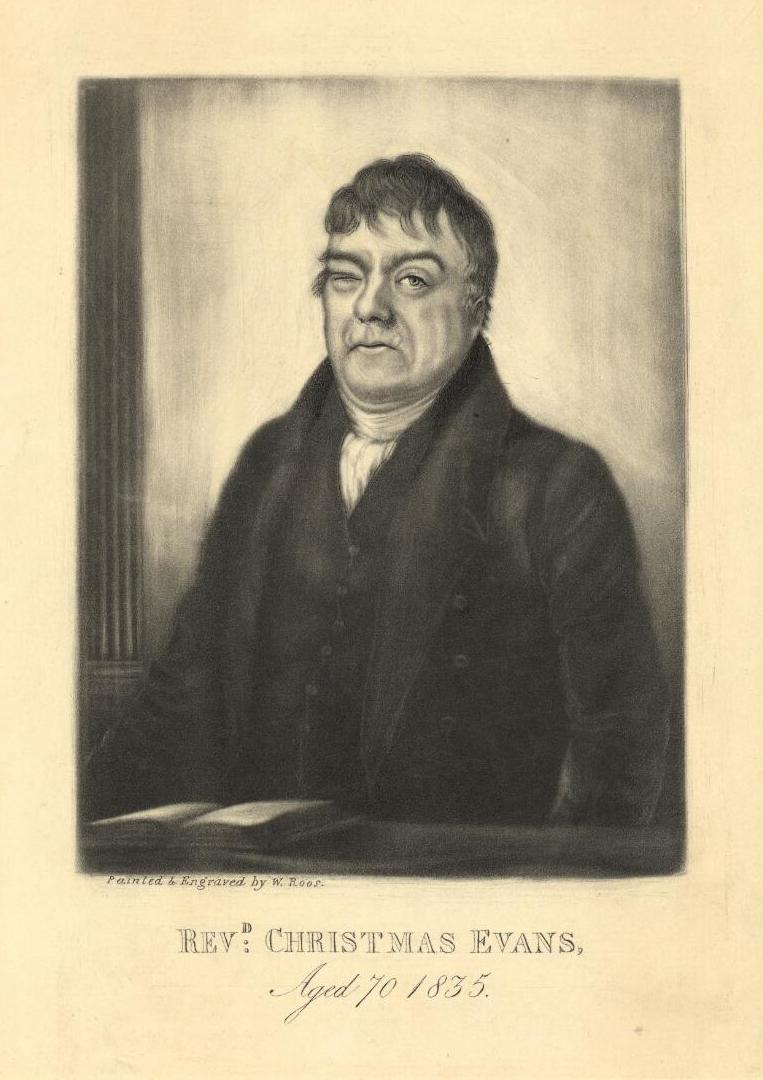
Christmas Evans (1835), mezzotint by Roos after his own painting, National Library of Wales

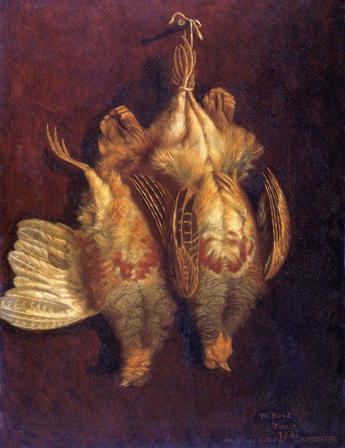
Bywyd Llonydd gyda Phetris (Still Life with Partridges) (1841), National Museum Cardiff
