= Greensville =

Greensville may refer to:

- Greensville, Ontario, Canada
- Greensville County, Virginia
- Greensville Correctional Center, a state prison facility in Greensville County, Virginia

== See also ==
- Greenville (disambiguation)
