= Scotch Road =

Road in Quebec, Canada

Coordinates: 45°40′55″N 74°35′9″W

The Scotch Road is a significant historical North-South road running through the rugged foothills of the Laurentian Mountains of Grenville-sur-la-Rouge, Quebec, Canada. It runs from its southern junction with Autoroute 50 and Route 148 near the border with the Village of Grenville, to its northern junction with the Harrington Road near Harrington. For most of its history, the Scotch Road was the main transportation route between the Village of Grenville and the once-bustling mining village of Kilmar, Quebec, situated in the hills along the Ottawa River between Ottawa and Montreal in the Laurentides region of western Quebec. It historically has served as the sole access route for the communities of McGillivray Lake, as well as the once-flourishing Scotch Road settlement.

Its name is derived from the significant number of Scottish immigrants who cleared the area for homesteads and farms from the early 19th century to the early 20th century. At its zenith, the Scotch Road settlement had a considerable population that allowed for the construction of both a post office and schoolhouse for Scottish homesteaders. The Scotch Road Cemetery, tucked away in the forest halfway up the road, holds many of the deceased Scottish settlers from this period, with notable names of McPhee, Cameron, McVicar, McGillivary, McHardy to name only a few.

In its more recent history, the Scotch Road was paralleled for most of its route (and intersected) by the now-defunct Dominion Timber and Minerals Railway from the early 1930s, until July 1981.

By 2012, the road had fallen into severe disrepair, leading the municipal government of Grenville-sur-la-Rouge, Quebec to authorize several emergency repairs.
