= Grenville, Grenville-sur-la-Rouge =

Coordinates: 45°43′N 74°40′W

Grenville (French pronunciation: [ɡʁɛnvil]) is a borough of the municipality of Grenville-sur-la-Rouge in Quebec, Canada, located on the left bank of the Ottawa River.

== History ==
Prior to April 24, 2002, it was an independent township municipality. On that date it merged with the village municipality of Calumet to form a new municipality which took the name Grenville-sur-la-Rouge, and each of the two components became boroughs of the new municipality.

The village municipality that shares the name "Grenville" remained independent; it borders on Grenville-sur-la-Rouge but is not part of it.

The name "Grenville" comes from William Wyndham Grenville, a British statesman who served briefly as British prime minister (1806–1807). While Canada was still under British rule, a canal was built by the military to bypass a series of rapids in the Ottawa River. The canal and the settlement that arose in the region were named in Lord Grenville's honour.
