= Greenville, Oregon =

Greenville, Oregon may refer to:

- Greenville, Linn County, Oregon, a populated place
- Greenville, Washington County, Oregon, a historic locale
