= Granville Bridge =

Granville Bridge may refer to:

- Granville Bridge, Maryborough, a bridge in Maryborough, Queensland, Australia
- Granville Street Bridge, a bridge in Vancouver, British Columbia

== See also ==
- Granville
