= Daniel Davies (preacher) =

Welsh Baptist minister (1797–1876)

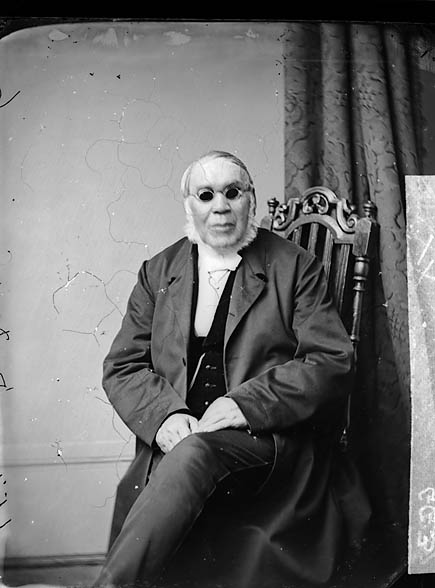
Dr Daniel Davies, Swansea (1797–1876) NLW3361968

Daniel Davies (15 November 1797 – 19 February 1876) was a Welsh Baptist preacher, also known as "Y Dyn Dall" (The Blind Man).

== Early life and education ==
Davies was born at Moelfre, Llanfair-ar-y-bryn, Carmarthenshire. His father was Joshua Davies. He was living in Dowlais, Merthyr Tydfil as a boy when he became blind after surviving smallpox. In 1815 he was admitted as a student at the Royal School for the Blind, Liverpool, where he not only learned manual skills such as basketry and weaving, but also learned to speak English.

== Career ==
Davies was 19 when he started preaching in Wales, at first as a Presbyterian, but soon as a Baptist. In the 1820s he had a stint preaching to Welsh Baptist congregations in London, but he was called to a position at Bethesda Welsh Baptist Chapel in Swansea in 1826, and served that church until 1855. Late in life he preached at various churches in Wales. He took a favorable position on state education and English-language education for Welsh children. He was noted for his intellect and his passion for learning; one acquaintance recalled of his preaching, "He was like one of those transatlantic steamers that must be seen in deep waters to be appreciated." Rev. D. T. Phillips listed him as one of the "princes of the pulpit" in Welsh history. When a visiting pastor preached in English, Davies translated the message into Welsh for his congregation. Noted Welsh preacher Christmas Evans died at the home of Daniel Davies in 1838, and Davies preached at his funeral.

He sat for a portrait with photographer John Thomas as an old man. Davies died in 1876, age 78. His gravesite is in Swansea, in a vault at the former Bethesda Welsh Baptist Chapel. He was married; his wife died before 1856. They had at least one daughter who survived him, a Mrs. J. Rowlands of Llanelly.
