= SS Georgetown Victory =

Victory ship of the United States

- Typical Victory Ship.

History

United States
- Name: SS Georgetown Victory
- Namesake: Georgetown University
- Owner: War Shipping Administration
- Operator: American Export Line
- Builder: Bethlehem-Fairfield Shipyard Corp. Baltimore, Maryland
- Laid down: 8 March 1945
- Launched: 28 April 1945
- Completed: 22 May 1945
- Fate: Wrecked and sank April 30, 1946 off Ireland

General characteristics
- Class & type: VC2-S-AP3 Victory ship
- Tonnage: 7612 GRT, 4,553 NRT
- Displacement: 15,200 tons
- Length: 455 ft (139 m)
- Beam: 62 ft (19 m)
- Draught: 28 ft (8.5 m)
- Installed power: 8,500 shp (6,300 kW)
- Propulsion: HP & LP turbines geared to a single 20.5-foot (6.2 m) propeller
- Speed: 16.5 knots
- Boats & landing craft carried: 4 Lifeboats
- Complement: 62 Merchant Marine and 28 US Naval Armed Guards
- Armament: 1 × 5 inch (127 mm)/38 caliber gun; 1 × 3 inch (76 mm)/50 caliber gun; 8 × 20 mm Oerlikon

SS Georgetown Victory was a Victory ship built for the War Shipping Administration late in World War II under the Emergency Shipbuilding program. She was a type VC2-S-AP2/WSAT cargo ship with the United States Maritime Commission (MCV) -"Victory"; hull number 653, shipyard number 1597 and built by Bethlehem Shipbuilding Corporation in Baltimore, Maryland, she was laid down on 8 March 1945. Georgetown Victory, named after Georgetown University, was launched from the Bethlehem-Fairfield shipyard at Baltimore on April 28, 1945 and completed on 22 May 1945.

Georgetown Victory was one of many new 10,500-ton class ships to be known as Victory ships, designed to replace the earlier Liberty Ships. Liberty ships were designed to be used solely for World War II, whereas Victory ships were designed to last longer and to serve the US Navy after the war. Victory ships differed from Liberty ships in that they were faster, longer, wider, taller, and had a thinner stack set farther toward the superstructure. In addition, they had a long raised forecastle.

== Troopship conversion ==
Georgetown Victory was converted from a cargo ship to a troopship able to transport up to 1,500 troops. Her cargo holds were converted to bunk beds and hammocks stacked three high for hot bunking. In the cargo hold Mess halls and exercise areas were also added. She was operated by American Export Line.

== World War II ==
Entering service near the end of the war, the Georgetown Victory and 97 other Victory troopships, were given the task of transporting the troops home as part of Operation Magic Carpet. She was operated by the American Export Lines. Georgetown Victory returned the 326th Glider Infantry Regiment home to the USA at New York Harbor on 27 August 1945, some of the Regiment also came home on the SS Cranston Victory. October 19, 1945 she arrived in Pennsylvania with 2002 troops, aboard was the 433rd Signal Battalion Heavy Construction; Headquarters and Base Service Squadrons of the 467th, 372d, 488th Air Service Groups; 1928th Ordnance Ammunition Company; 3629th, 3691st, 3633d Quartermaster Truck Companies; 5th Antiaircraft Artillery Group, Headquarters and Headquarters Battery.

== Post World War II Service ==
She arrived at Port Dickson on the west coast of Malaysia on the 19 December 1945. During the same month she took 1,400 troops home form Morotai in Indonesia to Australia On 20 January 1946 Georgetown Victory departed Labuan in East Malaysia and delivered troops to Rabaul in Papua New Guinea on 28 January 1946. Georgetown Victory arrived in Brisbane in February of 1946.

On 27 Nov. 27 1945 in Saigon the Merchant Marine seamen of the ship SS Taos Victory, SS Georgetown Victory, SS Winchester Victory and SS Kingsport Victory held a joint meeting aboard the Taos Victory. The meeting was about if American Merchant Seamen should support French Indochina Colonial actions. To quote: "THAT WHEREAS, we. as loyal American Merchant Seamen fought and sacrificed for the democratic principles and ideals as outlined at the Teheran, Yalta and San Francisco conferences, to which our country was a signatory; and whereas our Government continues to charter American owned and operated, ships flying the American flag to a foreign government, in this instance, the British Government. At which government, in turn, is permitting the French Government to transport French Colonial Combat Troops to Indochina for the purpose of suppressing the attempts of the native population to establish a free and democratic government of its own choosing, a right that has been guaranteed them at all the Three conferences. "AND WHEREAS, the fact that these troops are equipped with American weapons, clothing and food, that are being transported on American ships by American seamen, make it appear in the eyes of the native populations that our Government is carrying out the imperialist policies of the French and British And then this one: "AND WHEREAS, we, as American Merchant Seamen, as far back as 1936. attempted by strikes and protest to bring before the American public the then dangerous policy that our government was following in allowing certain selfish and greedy vested interests to sell and ship guns, cotton, oil and scrap iron to Japan. Our protests and strikes against this policy were condemned by this powerful and reactionary group."

== Ship Wreck ==
She departed Sydney with 1400 troops steaming to Glasgow in the United Kingdom. She stopped for water and fuel at Fremantle in Australia, Colombo in Sri Lanka and Aden in Yemen via the Suez Canal. On April 30, 1946, just before midnight, Georgetown Victory ran aground hard, at near top speed, 100 yards south of Killard Point, in County Down, Northern Ireland, north of Ballyhornan. All of the 1400 Royal Navy and Royal Marines aboard were rescued by a young police constable Eric Bownes who was sent as the only police officer on the scene. From 12 Midnight to 5pm the next day, Eric worked to save the 1400 men. The following day, many fishing boats from the local community came to 'loot' the S.S Georgetown and the Royal Ulster Constabulary and authorities contained all the inventory of the ship. The wreck was close to shore so some men were waded ashore with Eric and were brought to the aerodrome. The Irish Cloughey and Newcastle lifeboats were launched on the afternoon of 1 May to help. Winter storms later broke the wreck into two parts. Later, all remaining portable gear not already taken by looters was removed and the ship abandoned. The ship sections were salvaged in 1951 and consigned to the ship-breakers at Troon in Scotland. Parts of the ship are still at 54°18′45″N 5°31′15″W, where she ran aground, now a dive site.

== See also ==
- List of Victory ships
- Liberty ship
- Type C1 ship
- Type C2 ship
- Type C3 ship

== Sources ==
- Sawyer, L.A. and W.H. Mitchell. Victory ships and tankers: The history of the ‘Victory’ type cargo ships and of the tankers built in the United States of America during World War II, Cornell Maritime Press, 1974, 0-87033-182-5.
- United States Maritime Commission:
- Victory Cargo Ships
