= Granville Station =

Granville Station may refer to:

- Granville station (CTA), a station on Chicago Transit Authority's Red Line
- Granville station (SkyTrain), a SkyTrain station on the Expo Line in Metro Vancouver, Canada
- Granville Island station, a former station in Vancouver on what was a streetcar between the SkyTrain and Granville Island
- Granville railway station, on the Sydney Trains network
- Granville Street railway station, a former station in Birmingham on what was the West Suburban Railway, now the Cross City Line
- Granville station (Manche), a TER Normandie station in Granville, Manche, France
