= Lower Greenville, Nova Scotia =

Community in Nova Scotia, Canada

Coordinates: 45°38′16.32″N 63°36′53.55″W

Lower Greenville in Nova Scotia

Lower Greenville is a community in the Canadian province of Nova Scotia, located in Cumberland County.
