= Granville line =

Line of demarcation between counties in North Carolina

The Granville Line is a historical and geographic feature in North Carolina. Counties in the coastal region of the Carolina colony began to be formed in the latter 17th century. In 1711, the colony was divided into North Carolina and South Carolina. As settlement moved westward in North Carolina, additional counties were formed to meet the needs of governance in the expanding colony.

In 1753, Rowan County was formed from Anson County. This had the effect of splitting the counties along an east–west line approximately halfway between the borders with Virginia and South Carolina. This line was named "Earl Granville's Line," and fell just north of 35½º north latitude. The Granville Line continued to serve as a baseline for boundaries as new counties were formed. Today, the Granville Line is evident on maps of North Carolina counties as a straight demarcation dividing Chatham, Randolph, Davidson, Rowan, and Iredell Counties on the northern side of the Line from Moore, Montgomery, Stanly, Cabarrus, and Mecklenburg Counties on the south.
