= SS Greece Victory =

Victory ship of the United States

- Typical Victory Ship.

History

United States
- Name: SS Greece Victory
- Namesake: Greece
- Owner: War Shipping Administration
- Operator: Grace Line
- Builder: California Shipbuilding Company, Los Angeles
- Laid down: December 7, 1943
- Launched: February 3, 1944
- Completed: April 14, 1944
- Fate: Scrapped 1972 in Portland, Oregon.

General characteristics
- Class & type: VC2-S-AP3 Victory ship
- Tonnage: 7612 GRT, 4,553 NRT
- Displacement: 15,200 tons
- Length: 455 ft (139 m)
- Beam: 62 ft (19 m)
- Draught: 28 ft (8.5 m)
- Installed power: 8,500 shp (6,300 kW)
- Propulsion: HP & LP turbines geared to a single 20.5-foot (6.2 m) propeller
- Speed: 16.5 knots
- Boats & landing craft carried: 4 Lifeboats
- Complement: 62 Merchant Marine and 28 US Naval Armed Guards
- Armament: 1 × 5 inch (127 mm)/38 caliber gun; 1 × 3 inch (76 mm)/50 caliber gun; 8 × 20 mm Oerlikon

The SS Greece Victory was the second Victory ship built during World War II under the Emergency Shipbuilding program. She was launched by the California Shipbuilding Company on February 3, 1944, and completed on April 14, 1944. The ship's United States Maritime Commission designation was VC2- S- AP3, hull number 2. SS Greece Victory served in the Pacific Ocean during World War II. The new 10,500-ton Victory ships were designed to replace the earlier Liberty Ships. Liberty ships were designed to be used just for World War II. Victory ships were designed to last longer and serve the US Navy after the war. The Victory ship differed from a Liberty ship in that they were: faster, longer and wider, taller, had a thinner stack set farther toward the superstructure and had a long raised forecastle.

SS Greece Victory was christened by Mrs. Calypsn Picheon, wife of Ehas Pichnon, the Greece consul general on February 4, 1944. The launching of The SS Greece Victory splashed into the water of Terminal Island to enter the Pacific War.

== World War II ==
Greece Victory was operated by Grace Line under charter with the Maritime Commission and War Shipping Administration. SS Greece Victory took supplies to troops on Russell Islands and Guadalcanal. She also helped in the capture of Tulagi as part of Operation Watchtower in May 1944. She supplied a number of Tank Landing Ships in World War II, including the USS LST-481.

== Post World War II ==
SS Greece Victory served as merchant marine naval supplying goods for the Korean War. About 75 percent of the personnel going to Korea for the Korean War came by the merchant marine. SS Greece Victory transported goods, mail, food and other supplies. About 90 percent of the cargo was moved by merchant marine naval ships to the war zone. SS Greece Victory made trip between November 18, 1950, and December 23, 1952, helping American forces engaged against Communist aggression in South Korea.

SS Greece Victory took supplies to the Arctic in 1952. The USCGC Eastwind icebreaker cutter, built in 1944, broke the ice for Greece Victory to take supplies on the Arctic Cruise for scientific test. Eastwind was one of four vessels of her class. The Greece Victory had a radio station on her, her call letter were KWLT in 1956.

She spent time laid up in Mobile, Alabama and Olympia, Washington as part of the National Defense Reserve Fleet. In 1972 she was scrapped in Portland, Oregon.

== See also ==
- List of Victory ships
- Type C1 ship
- Type C2 ship
- Type C3 ship

== Sources ==
- Sawyer, L.A. and W.H. Mitchell. Victory ships and tankers: The history of the ‘Victory’ type cargo ships and of the tankers built in the United States of America during World War II, Cornell Maritime Press, 1974, 0-87033-182-5.
- United States Maritime Commission:
- Victory Cargo Ships
