= Richard Granville =

English cricketer

Personal information
- Full name: Richard St Leger Granville
- Born: 24 April 1907; Kings Worthy, Hampshire, England
- Died: 8 August 1972 (aged 65); Banbury, Oxfordshire, England
- Batting: Right-handed
- Relatives: Francis Compton (great-uncle)

Domestic team information
- Years: Team
- 1934: Warwickshire

Career statistics
Competition	First-class
Matches	1
Runs scored	9
Batting average	4.50
100s/50s	–/–
Top score	7
Balls bowled	–
Wickets	–
Bowling average	–
5 wickets in innings	–
10 wickets in match	–
Best bowling	–
Catches/stumpings	–/–
- Source: Cricinfo, 7 May 2012

Richard St Leger Granville (24 April 1907 – 8 August 1972) was an English cricketer. Granville was a right-handed batsman. He was born at Kings Worthy, Hampshire.

Granville made a single first-class appearance for Warwickshire against Leicestershire at Edgbaston in the 1934 County Championship. Warwickshire won the toss and elected to bat, making 163 all out in their first-innings, with Granville who batted at number seven scoring 2 runs before he was dismissed by Ewart Astill. Leicestershire responded in their first-innings with 125 all out, to which Warwickshire responded in their second-innings with 148 all out, with Granville making 7 runs before he was dismissed by Astill once more. Warwickshire went on to win the match by 78 runs. This was his only major appearance for Warwickshire.

He died at Banbury, Oxfordshire, on 8 August 1972. His great-uncle, Francis Compton, was a first-class cricketer and a member of parliament.
