= Grenville Secondary School =

Location
- Grenville, St. Andrews; Grenada
- Coordinates: 12.119876°N 61.626453°W

Information
- Motto: Una Amore Aedificare
- Established: 1983
- Principal: Mr. Kwame Hypolite
- Teaching staff: >20
- Enrollment: 400-500
- Colors: Orange, Black

Grenville Secondary School is a co-educational institution located in Grenville, St. Andrews parish, Grenada. Founded in 1983, it has a student population of 400 to 500 students and a teaching staff of over 20. The school's motto is 'Together We Build in Love' (Latin: Una Amore Aedificare).

== History ==
On September 9, 1983, the Grenville Secondary School opened as Jeremiah Richardson Secondary School, with 116 students and six staff. Within a month, the school's enrollment had increased to 186. Stephen Wall was the school's first principal.
