= Greenville metropolitan area =

The Greenville metropolitan area may refer to:

- Greenville micropolitan area, Mississippi, United States
- Greenville metropolitan area, North Carolina, United States
- Greenville micropolitan area, Ohio, United States
- Greenville metropolitan area, South Carolina, United States

== See also ==
- Greenville (disambiguation)
