= Calumet, Quebec =

Coordinates: 45.648580°N 74.643638°W

Calumet is a former municipality and an unincorporated community in Grenville-sur-la-Rouge, Quebec, Canada. It is recognized as a designated place by Statistics Canada.

== History ==
The village municipality of Calumet was officially created on February 8, 1918 by separating from the township municipality of Grenville. On April 24, 2002, Calumet and the township of Grenville merged together to form the municipality of Grenville-sur-la-Rouge.

== Demographics ==
In the 2021 Census of Population conducted by Statistics Canada, Calumet had a population of 521 living in 247 of its 270 total private dwellings, a change of -5.3% from its 2016 population of 550. With a land area of 4.75 km^{2} (1.83 sq mi), it had a population density of 109.7/km^{2} (284.1/sq mi) in 2021.

== See also ==
- List of communities in Quebec
- List of designated places in Quebec
- List of former municipalities in Quebec
