= Grenville Pinto =

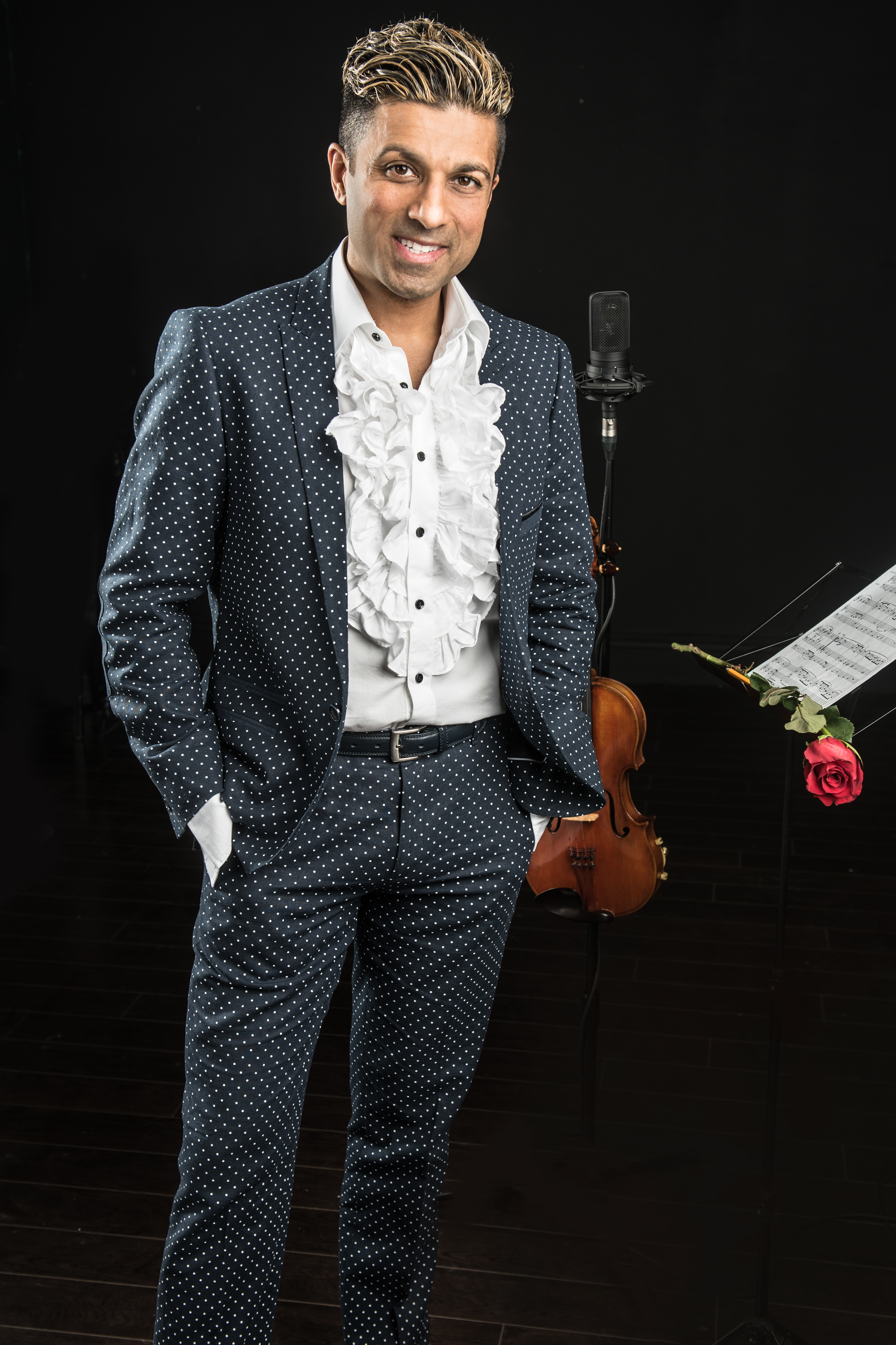
- Grenville Pinto

Background information
- Origin: Hamilton, Ontario
- Genres: Classical music, rock, pop, folk, thrash metal, heavy metal, hard rock, symphonic metal, progressive rock, progressive metal
- Occupation: Musician
- Instrument: Violin
- Years active: 1989–present
- Website: gpinto.com

Grenville Pinto is a Canadian violinist, recording artist, entertainer and composer based in Toronto, Ontario. He was trained under the Royal Conservatory of Music and was also a member of the Philharmonic Orchestra in Hamilton.

== Biography ==
Grenville was born in Hamilton, Ontario in a musical family. His mother plays and teaches piano and his father is a singer. His two sisters are professional pianists who have accompanied him on numerous occasions. Grenville attended McMaster University in Hamilton where he received his bachelor's degree in commerce.

Grenville is a classically trained musician who studied music at the Royal Conservatory of Music, Toronto. He has been playing violin since the age of seven and has performed for thousands of events. He has shared concert stages with many artists including two time Juno award winner singer/songwriter Serena Ryder, tenor Michael Ciufo, instrumentalist Pavlo, international pops symphony singer Sarah Pacheco, and many others. He has performed across North America for special events and in numerous concerts including various TEDx events, he has also appeared on various national television shows including Rich Bride Poor Bride and 100 Huntley Street.

== Discography ==
- Compilation (2007)
- Playtime (2010)
- Christmas Glow (2012)
- Perfect Day (2014)
