= Grandville (graphic novel) =

2009 graphic novel by Bryan Talbot

- The front cover of Grandville, the first volume the Grandville series.
- Page count: 104 pages
- Publisher: Jonathan Cape (UK); Dark Horse Comics (US); Milady (France); Comma 22 (Italy); Nicola Pesce Editore (Italy); Jemma Press (Greece); Reservoir Books (Spain); Comics Centrum (Czech Republic)

Creative team
- Writers: Bryan Talbot
- Artists: Bryan Talbot

Original publication
- Date of publication: 15 October 2009
- Language: English
- ISBN: 978-0224084888

Grandville is the first of a five-part British graphic novel series written and drawn by Bryan Talbot. Published on 15 October 2009, it is a mixture of the steampunk, alternative history and thriller genres. It is set in a world in which France won the Napoleonic Wars and invaded Britain, and in which the world is populated mostly by anthropomorphic animals. The book follows a British anthropomorphic badger, Detective Inspector Archie LeBrock of Scotland Yard, investigating a murder which leads him to visit Paris in order to solve the crime, which itself leads him to uncover a political conspiracy.

== Publication history ==
=== Development ===
Talbot writes in his book that Grandville is inspired by the work of Jean Ignace Isidore Gérard, who worked under the name J.J. Grandville, and Albert Robida. He states he is also inspired by Sir Arthur Conan Doyle, Rupert Bear and Quentin Tarantino. References are made to them in the book. For example, there is a building called "Robida Tower" and an early scene set in England takes place in a village called "Nutwood", the setting of the Rupert Bear stories.

Grandville makes several references to modern day political events. There are references to the war on terror, weapons of mass destruction and the September 11 attacks. There are also references to other works, such as The Adventures of Tintin.

== Plot ==
=== Setting ===
Grandville is set in a steampunk world, featuring steam-powered motor vehicles, air transport, robots (known as "Automatons") and televisions. In this world, Britain lost the Napoleonic War and was invaded by France, and the British royal family were guillotined. Britain was later given independence from the French Empire following "a prolonged campaign of civil disobedience and anarchist bombings." Following independence, Britain became "The Socialist Republic of Britain". 23 years later, by which time the English is only spoken in rural communities, Britain is linked to the French Empire by the Channel railway bridge, and Paris is the biggest city in the world.

The vast population in Grandville are anthropomorphic animals. Humans do exist, however. Having evolved in Angoulême, they are referred to by the French as "doughfaces". This is most likely because compared to animal facial features, human faces appear as pale and smooth, reminiscent of the dough substances used to make bread. Having never gained citizens' rights, and are considered menial workers. They are not allowed passports and so have never made it to Britain.

=== Story ===
The book begins with a chase in the streets of Paris, also known as Grandville, in which British diplomat Raymond Leigh-Otter (an otter) escapes from a group of assassins. The action then cuts to Leigh-Otter's house, in which he is found shot dead and the local police are inspecting the body. Detective Inspector Archie LeBrock of Scotland Yard, a large, heavily built badger, arrives with his assistant, Detective Roderick Ratzi (a rat), and deduces that Leigh-Otter was in fact murdered, after LeBrock notices that Leigh-Otter is holding the gun in his right paw when in fact he is left-handed. Thus, they go to Paris in order to investigate.

After LeBrock and Ratzi check into their hotel, they learn that Leigh-Otter often met up with a female guest, Coco (a very attractive cat), the dresser for music hall star Sarah Blairow (a badger). After further investigation they learn that others have also committed suicide, including Coco. As LeBrock goes to meet Sarah, he finds that some assassins have come to kill her. LeBrock gets rid of them and learns that they are working for an organisation called "The Knights of Lyon". LeBrock tells Sarah to go into hiding while he and Ratzi try to solve the case.

While LeBrock attempts to find more information by interviewing the British ambassador, Honourable Citizen Turtell (a tortoise), Ratzi learns the Knights of Lyon are a medieval religious cult possibly connected to the Knights Templar. They visit the Robida Tower ground zero site, which had been bombed by British anarchists, causing tension between Britain and France. Two assassins approach LeBrock, who makes his way to a Turkish bath. LeBrock stops them and learns that the assassins do not know who they are working for, knowing them only as "The Knights". LeBrock kills them.

Ratzi investigates another of the suicides, that of Professor Tope (a mole), pioneer of automaton engineering. After talking to his son, they learn he had an assistant called Snowy Milou (white Wire Fox Terrier). After searching Tope's old lab, LeBrock receives a telephone call from Sarah asking him to visit, because she is worried about her safety. She seduces LeBrock after he arrives and the two make love.

The next day, LeBrock learns that Milou has become an opium addict and drug dealer. Ratzi uncovers a photograph which features Tope and several other public figures: Jean-Marie Lapin (a rabbit), a far-right nationalist politician and now Prime Minister who came to power following the bombing of Robida Tower, promising a "War on Terror"; Madame Krupp (a wombat), an arms manufacturer and newspaper owner; the Archbishop of Paris (a chimpanzee); Reinhardt (a rhinoceros) the Minister for War; and Hyen (a hyena), Chief of Police and Secret Service. LeBrock believes they are the Knights of Lyon and goes to investigate the Archbishop.

LeBrock meets up with Milou and learns from him the whereabouts of the Archbishop. LeBrock and Ratzi capture the Archbishop, tie him to a chair and threaten to kill him by setting fire to him. LeBrock deduces that the attack on Robida Tower was organised by the Archbishop and the other Knights (with the help of Tope), who used the British anarchists as scapegoats. Under pressure, the Archbishop tells them that they did it because they believed they could protect French society from decadency and atheism by uniting them against a common enemy. An attempt to unite the people by having a war in French Indo-China had failed, so the Knights began to spread stories of a British super-bomb aimed at Paris. Their final plan is to launch a skyship from Krupp's estate and fly it into the Paris Opera House, where thousands will be watching the Trans-Empire Song Contest. Afterwards, LeBrock sets the Archbishop on fire, killing him. Outside, LeBrock tells Ratzi that he believes that Leigh-Otter was not a diplomat, but a member of the British Secret Service trying to stop the Knights' plan.

As LeBrock and Ratzi arrive back at the hotel, they receive a message from Sarah saying that she is in danger. The two arrive at her hideout to find she is being held captive by the assassins. During a shoot-out, Sarah is killed and Ratzi badly injured. The following morning, LeBrock asks a human bellboy at the hotel to collect some things for him - things he will use to make bombs. LeBrock makes his way to the Krupp estate, where the Knights are preparing for the attack on the Opera House. LeBrock sets off his bombs and shoots Krupp, Hyen, Lapin and Reinhardt. Krupp's dying words, to LeBrock, are that the Knights were loyal to the Emperor. He realises that they are not "The Knights of Lyons", but "The Knights of The Lion", the lion being Emperor Napoleon XII, the head of state. LeBrock is hit over the head with a chair by Reinhardt, who was not dead but only injured. Reinhardt makes his way to the skyship and prepares to leave. LeBrock follows him and grabs hold of the skyship as it takes off. Not seeing LeBrock, Reinhardt sets the skyship's course and prepares to jump out. As he opens the door, LeBrock jumps in. Reinhardt charges at him, but falls out of the door. As he falls, LeBrock shoots him dead. LeBrock then changes the skyship's course, crashing it into Napoleon's palace.

The next day the public learns the truth about the Knights and the attack on Robida Tower, with some wondering if a revolution might happen following the news. LeBrock meets up again with Ratzi in hospital.

== Reception ==
Grandville has received positive reviews.

Ryan Agee from The Skinny gave Grandville four out of five stars, writing: "Corny puns abound, but this is a stunningly well drawn book with a compelling mystery, and a great detective team at it's [sic] heart. Great stuff."

Neel Mukherjee in The Times was also positive saying: "It's a playful, allusive book in which there's a witty touch or deliciously knowing in-joke on almost every page: the French press whipping up Anglophobia; LeBrock's Holmes-like unpacking of apparently innocent signs, which yield vital information, when he makes his first appearance; the drug-addled Milou/Snowy, dreaming of plotlines of Tintin books in his opium-induced stupors. The numerous fight sequences are simply cracking, especially the beautifully rendered sprays of blood and, throughout, the glossy gorgeousness fills your eyes."

Rich Johnston from Bleeding Cool wrote that: "I love this comic. It's big, bold, brash, insanely detailed and has badgers torturing frogs. There are steam powered carriages and robots, gratuitous violence, big explosions, lots of kicking, a decent ending and Inspector LeBrock finding himself a long, long way from Wind In the Willows. It can be appreciated on so many levels and with so many potential fanbases basically performing bukkake upon the pages, it should appeal to a lot of people. even those who have a problem with a talking snobby French fish butler with legs. Also, don't try to work out the evolutionary timelines. It will just mess with your head. But do enjoy."

Joe McCulloch from The Savage Critics was less positive however, writing: "This doesn't automatically lend itself to a tremendous amount of depth, frankly, and the somewhat stale, vengeful nature of Talbot's plot leaves it teetering on the edge of embarrassing-silly instead of fun-silly."
