= Temple-Nugent-Brydges-Chandos-Grenville =

Temple-Nugent-Brydges-Chandos-Grenville is a surname, and may refer to:

- Anne Elizabeth Temple-Nugent-Brydges-Chandos-Grenville, Duchess of Buckingham (1779–1836), English peeress
- Richard Temple-Nugent-Brydges-Chandos-Grenville, 1st Duke of Buckingham and Chandos (1776–1839), British landowner and politician
- Richard Temple-Nugent-Brydges-Chandos-Grenville, 2nd Duke of Buckingham and Chandos (1797–1861), British Tory politician
- Richard Temple-Nugent-Brydges-Chandos-Grenville, 3rd Duke of Buckingham and Chandos (1823–1889), British soldier, politician and administrator
