= Grenville-sur-la-Rouge =

- Municipality
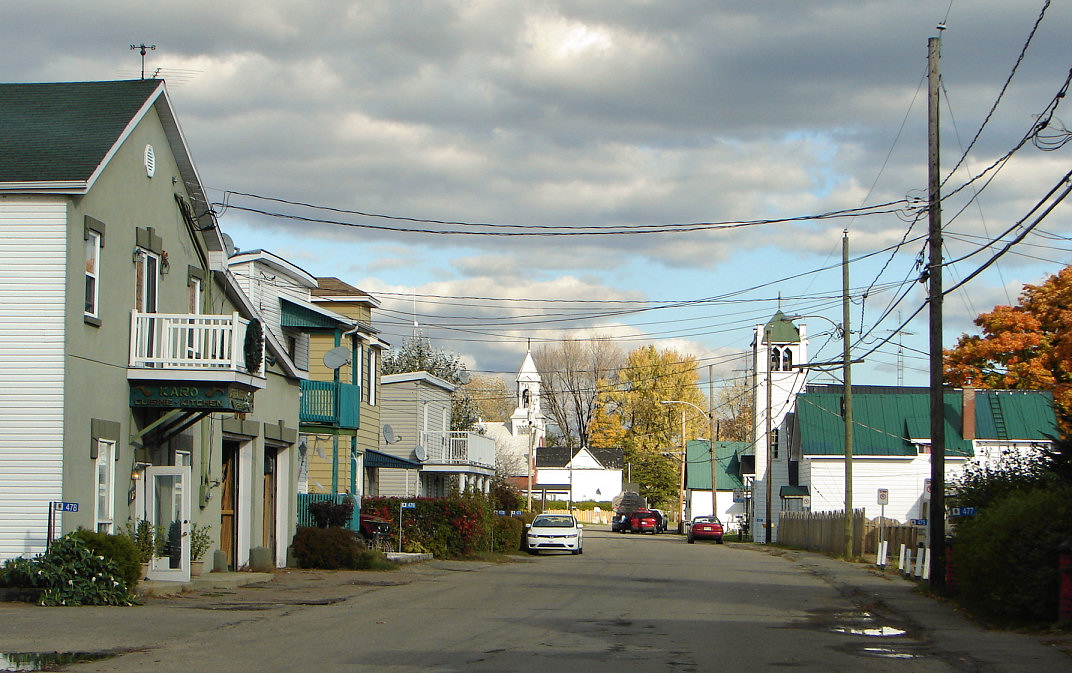
- Calumet's quiet main street

- Coat of arms
- Mottoes: Latin: Fraternitas, Aequalitas, Soliditas; ('Fraternity, Equality, Solidarity')
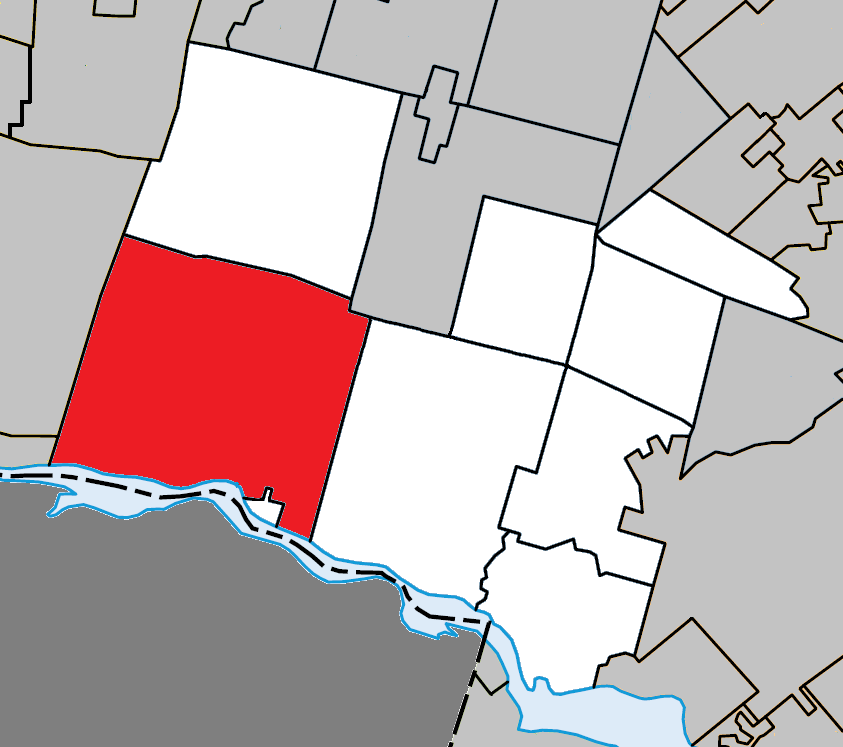
- Location within Argenteuil RCM

- Location in central Quebec
- Coordinates: 45°39′N 74°38′W
- Country: Canada
- Province: Quebec
- Region: Laurentides
- RCM: Argenteuil
- Constituted: April 24, 2002
- Boroughs: List: Calumet; Grenville

Government
  - Mayor: Tom Arnold
  - Federal riding: Argenteuil—La Petite-Nation
  - Prov. riding: Argenteuil

Area
  - Total: 329.10 km^{2} (127.07 sq mi)
  - Land: 313.61 km^{2} (121.09 sq mi)

Population (2021)
  - Total: 2,883
  - Density: 9.2/km^{2} (24/sq mi)
  - Pop 2016-2021: ▲2.1%
  - Dwellings: 1,808
- Time zone: UTC−5 (EST)
  - Summer (DST): UTC−4 (EDT)
- Postal code(s): J0V 1J0
- Area code: 819
- Highways; A-50: R-148; R-327; R-344
- Website: www.grenvillesurlarouge.ca/en/

Grenville-sur-la-Rouge (French pronunciation: [ɡʁɛnvil syʁ la ʁuʒ]) is a municipality in the Argenteuil Regional County Municipality in the Laurentides region of Quebec, Canada. It is a predominantly Francophone community situated along the southern border of Quebec between Montreal and Ottawa.

Most of the population of just over 2,800 live in a rural setting; the villages of Calumet and Pointe-au-Chêne comprise under 1,000 residents in total.

== History ==
Although the area has been settled for over 200 years, Grenville-sur-la-Rouge is a relatively new creation. It was formed in 2002 (as an ordinary municipality) by the merger of the village municipality of Calumet with the township municipality of Grenville; the latter is not to be confused with the neighbouring and still-independent village municipality of Grenville. Each of the two components, Calumet and Grenville, acquired the status of boroughs within the new municipality.

The name "Grenville" comes from William Wyndham Grenville, a British statesman who served briefly as British prime minister (1806–1807). While Canada was still under British rule, the Grenville Canal was built by the military to bypass a series of rapids in the Ottawa River. The canal and the settlement that arose in the region were named in Lord Grenville's honour.

The name "Rouge" derives from the municipality's location on the Rouge River, which runs from north to south roughly through the centre of the municipality. In English, Grenville-sur-la-Rouge means "Grenville-on-the-Rouge".

=== Flooding ===
In April 2019, record high water levels on the Rouge River made authorities order evacuation of parts of the community as a precaution in case the Bell Falls, or Chute-Bell, hydroelectric dam collapsed.

In 2021 the mayor of Grenville renewed calls for a beaver cull after nearly 200 beaver dams caused extensive flooding.

== Geography ==
Grenville-sur-la-Rouge covers a rectangular area along the shore of the Ottawa River and extends northward into the foothills of the Laurentian Mountains. The neighbouring village of Grenville is located on the Ottawa River.

The territory of Grenville-sur-la-Rouge includes several smaller neighbourhoods and communities, including Avoca, Bell Falls, Grenville Bay, Kilmar, Marelan, and Pointe-au-Chêne. The municipality includes a peninsula, L'Île ('the island'), that extends into the Ottawa River. Located between the outlets of the Rouge and Calumet Rivers, the peninsula's sheltered beaches, including the plage de la baie Pumpkinseed are known to birdwatchers for the variety of wading and shore birds that visit seasonally.

== Demographics ==
In the 2021 Census of Population conducted by Statistics Canada, Grenville-sur-la-Rouge had a population of 2,883 living in 1,376 of its 1,808 total private dwellings, a change of 2.1% from its 2016 population of 2,824. With a land area of 313.61 km^{2} (121.09 sq mi), it had a population density of 9.2/km^{2} (23.8/sq mi) in 2021.

Canada census – Grenville-sur-la-Rouge community profile

	2021	2016	2011
Population	2,883 (+2.1% from 2016)	2,824 (+2.8% from 2011)	2,746 (+0.9% from 2006)
Land area	313.61 km^{2} (121.09 sq mi)	317.65 km^{2} (122.65 sq mi)	315.85 km^{2} (121.95 sq mi)
Population density	9.2/km^{2} (24/sq mi)	8.9/km^{2} (23/sq mi)	8.7/km^{2} (23/sq mi)
Median age	53.2 (M: 54.0, F: 52.4)	52.2 (M: 52.2, F: 52.1)	50.4 (M: 50.8, F: 49.8)
Private dwellings	1,808 (total) 1,376 (occupied)	1,916 (total)	1,899 (total)
Median household income	$61,600	$54,016	$n/a

References: 2021 2016 2011

Historical census populations – Grenville-sur-la-Rouge

Year	Pop.	±%
2006	2,721	—
2011	2,746	+0.9%

Year	Pop.	±%
2016	2,824	+2.8%
2021	2,883	+2.1%

Source: Statistics Canada

- Languages:
  - English as first language: 26.4%
  - French as first language: 68.1%
  - English and French as first language: 3.1%
  - Other as first language: 1.7%
- Religious affiliation:
  - Catholic 57.8%
  - Protestant 14.1%
  - Other religions 0.6%
  - No religious affiliation 27.3%
- Experienced labour force:
  - Agriculture, forestry, fishing and hunting 5.5%
  - Mining, quarrying, and oil and gas extraction 4.8%
  - Utilities 0.7%
  - Construction 10.0%
  - Manufacturing 16.9%
  - Wholesale trade 1.7%
  - Retail trade 12.1%
  - Transportation and warehousing 4.1%
  - Information and cultural industries 0.7%
  - Finance and insurance 1.4%
  - Real estate and rental and leasing 0.7%
  - Professional, scientific and technical services 4.1%
  - Administrative and support, waste management and remediation services 2.8%
  - Educational services 4.1%
  - Health care and social assistance 11.4%
  - Arts, entertainment and recreation 1.7%
  - Accommodation and food services 5.5%
  - Other services (except public administration) 5.5%
  - Public administration 3.4%

== Economy ==
Many of the properties along the primary and secondary roads are established farms operated by third and fourth generation families. Forests cover a significant percentage of region and supports a limited amount of logging for regional pulp and paper mills, such as the Fraser Papers mill in Thurso, Quebec.

Tourism is an important part of the local economy, with several whitewater adventure companies being established along the Rouge River. First commercialized in the late 1970s, the Rouge River has become Quebec's most popular whitewater rafting location and is considered one of the best in North America. Local owners have also turned century-old homes into Bed & Breakfasts, which are especially popular in the fall.

The 2001 Statistics Canada census reports that the majority of Grenville-sur-la-Rouge's residents earn income from non-resource based sectors.

== Arts and culture ==
In the late 1960s, Alfred Joseph Casson (1892–1992) of Group of Seven fame, spent some time in what is now known as Grenville-sur-la-Rouge capturing the beautiful scenery on the lower Ottawa Valley. Paul Duval, in his biography of Casson wrote:

In 1958 Casson retired from Sampson Matthews Limited, which enabled him to devote himself full-time to painting. Although the Ontario countryside had been his main focus, starting in 1966 he turned his attention more seriously to Quebec. Up until this time, his experience there had been limited to a two-week trip to Lac La Pêche in 1950. As Duval writes, "Casson was persuaded at last to paint in Quebec by A.Y. Jackson ... Jackson spoke enthusiastically about the painting possibilities around the town of Grenville, a half-French, half-English community where he had stayed as a guest of Munroe Putnam." The Putnams, while in Toronto buying a number of sketches by Casson, invited him to their home to paint with Jackson. Casson made six consecutive summer trips to Grenville, exploring and painting the surrounding countryside, with Jackson showing him the choicest painting places. Duval writes, "Near to Grenville, were Harrington, Avoca and Montebello, all ideal landscape sites offering a rich variety of topography ... Altogether he painted at least 150 oil sketches while based at Grenville, more than he had ever done of any one specific place." This fine canvas reflects Casson's deep regard for this beautiful countryside.

Examples of Casson's painting from the region include:

- Rain at Grenville, Quebec (1967)
- Grenville, Quebec (1968)
- Farm Near Grenville, Quebec (1968). This work sold for $106,000 CAD in 2005
- Hill Country, Harrington, Quebec (1969)
- Morning Mist Rouge River, Quebec (1971)

== Government ==
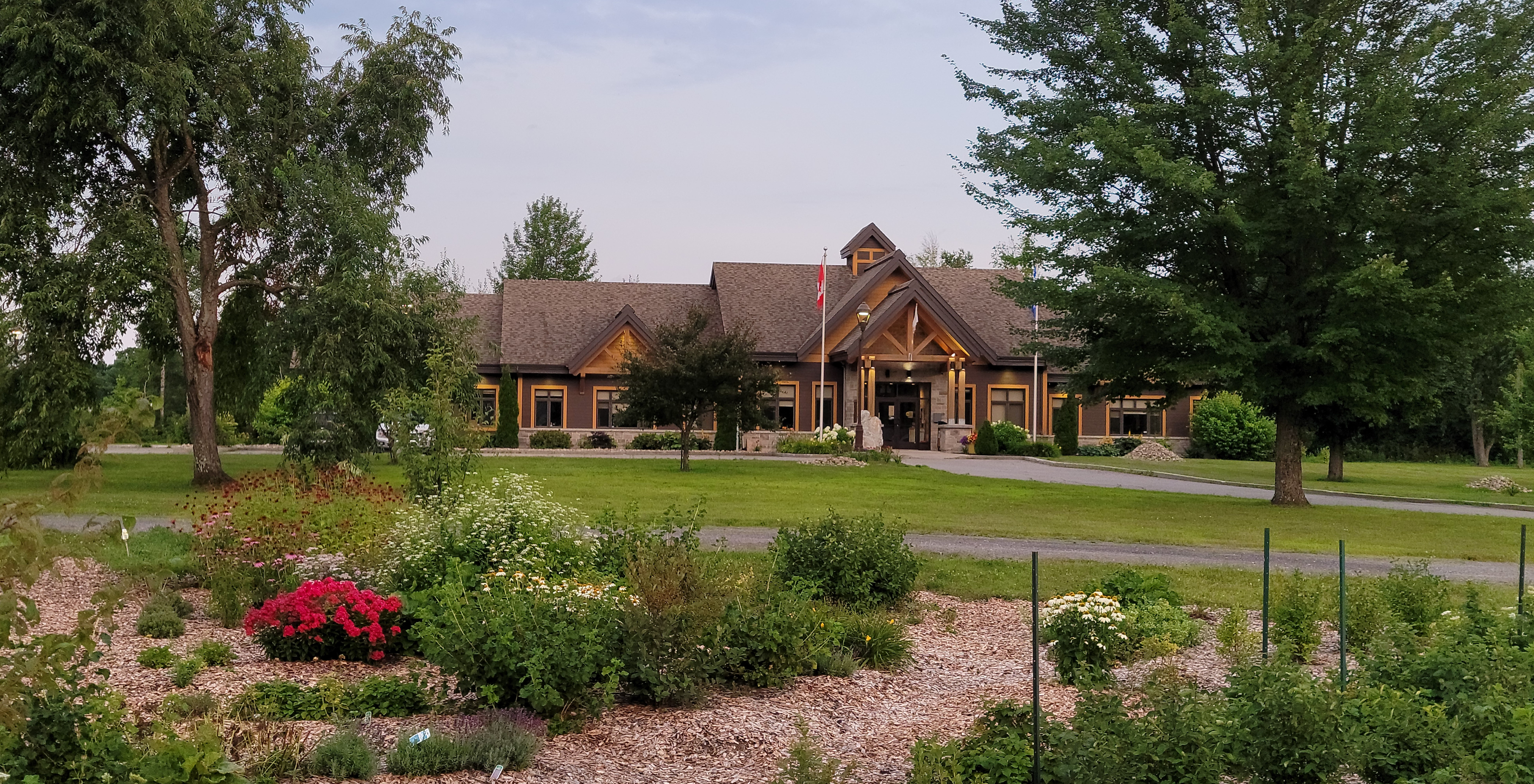
Town hall of Grenville-sur-la-Rouge, in July 2022

Local government comprises a mayor and councillors. The current mayor is Tom Arnold.

List of former mayors:

- H. Gary Cowan (2005–2009)
- Jean-Marc Fillion (2009–2010)
- John Saywell (2011–2012, 2013–2017)
- Diane Monette (interim, 2011–2013)
- Michel Brosseau (2013)
- Tom Arnold (2017–present)

== Infrastructure ==
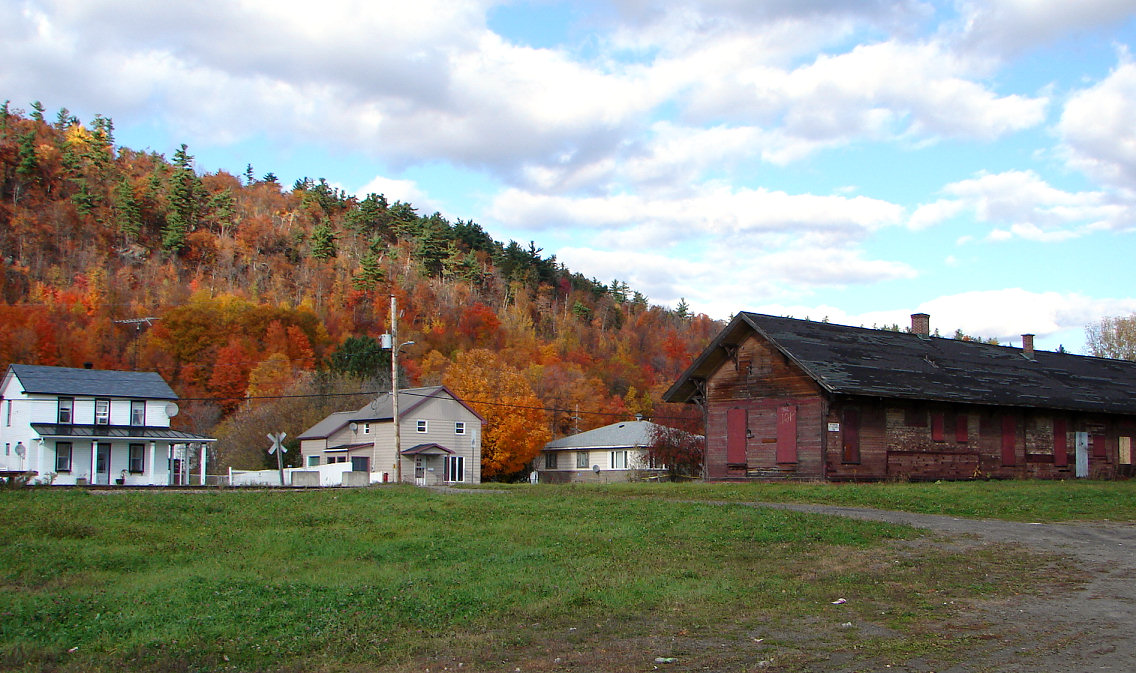
Derelict train station at Calumet

Route 148 and Route 344 are east–west highways that traverse the southern region of the municipality. Autoroute 50, an east–west highway, is also in the southern region with three interchanges in Grenville-sur-la-Rouge. Route 344 briefly passes through the Village of Grenville where one can cross over the Long-Sault Bridge to Hawkesbury, Ontario. The Long-Sault Bridge is the only bridge that crosses the Ottawa River between Ottawa and Montreal. The primary north–south access roads are the Rouge River Road, the Scotch Road, and Avoca Road. These secondary roads provide access to the communities of Avoca, Kilmar and Bell Falls.

== Education ==
The Commission scolaire de la Rivière-du-Nord operates French-language public schools.

- École polyvalente Lavigne in Lachute

The Sir Wilfrid Laurier School Board operates English-language public schools:

- Grenville Elementary School in Grenville serves most of the city, except what is east of Route 327 and Lac Keatley
- Laurentian Elementary School in Lachute serves a portion
- Laurentian Regional High School in Lachute

== See also ==
- List of anglophone communities in Quebec
- List of municipalities in Quebec
