= Greenville, Washington County, Oregon =

Coordinates: 45.592891°N 123.114275°W

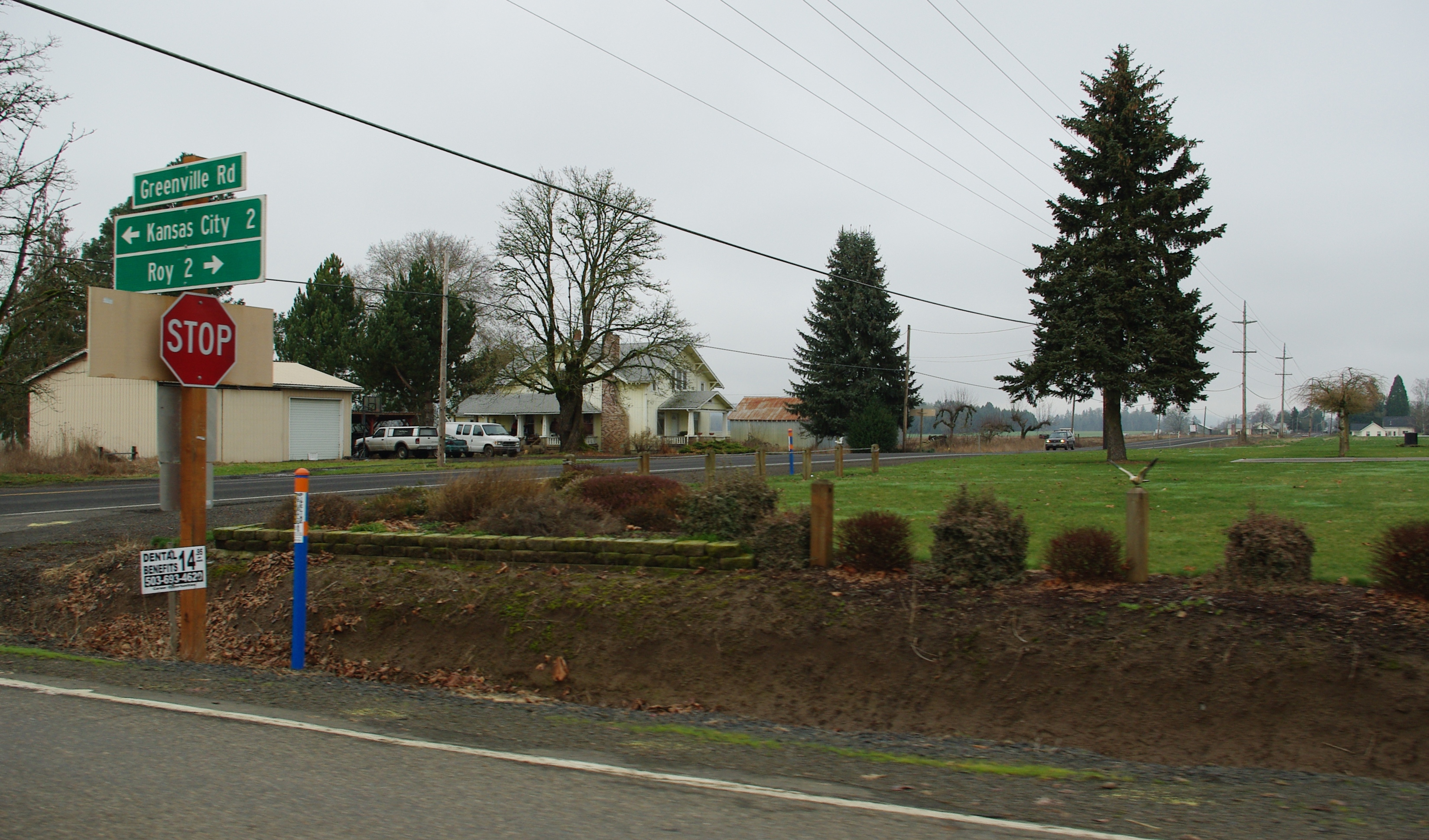
Greenville Road at Oregon 47

Greenville is an unincorporated historic community in Washington County, Oregon, United States. It is located approximately two miles south of Banks on Oregon Route 47.

Greenville post office was established in 1871 and ran until 1907, when it was moved to the location of the former Banks post office and renamed Banks. Greenville was likely a descriptive name for the verdant surroundings.

At one time the community had a school, built in the 1870s, which as of 1990 was being used as a storage shed. The area is part of the Forest Grove Rural Fire Protection District.
