= ARA Granville =

At least two ships of the Argentine Navy have been named Granville:

- ARA Granville (M-4), a Bouchard-class minesweeper commissioned in 1937 and decommissioned in 1967.
- ARA Granville (P-33), a Drummond-class corvette launched in 1980.
