= Jennifer Howard-Grenville =

Organisational scientist

- Born: Jennifer Howard

Academic background
- Education: Massachusetts Institute of Technology
- Thesis: Inside out : a cultural study of environmental work in semiconductor manufacturing (2000)

Jennifer A. Howard-Grenville is a Canadian-British organisational scientist, and Diageo Professor of Organisation Studies at the Cambridge Judge Business School. She is known for her work on organisation change, environmental sustainability, and organisational culture.

== Education ==
Howard-Grenville received a B.Sc. in Engineering Physics from Queen’s University in 1990. She was awarded a Rhodes Scholarship in 1990 and received an M.A. in Politics, Philosophy, and Economics from the University in Oxford in 1992. In 2000, she obtained a Ph.D. in Technology, Policy, and Management from the Massachusetts Institute of Technology.

== Career ==
After receiving her Ph.D. in 2000, Howard-Grenville served as a postdoctoral fellow at the Yale School of Forestry and Environmental Studies for one year before moving to Boston University School of Management. From 2007 until 2015 she was at the University of Oregon's Lundquist College of Business serving first as an assistant professor and then associate professor, where for the year 2013 she was the Thomas C. Stewart Distinguished Professor. In In 2015, Howard-Grenville moved to the Cambridge Judge Business School, where as of 2024 she is the Diageo Professor of Organisation Studies at Cambridge Judge Business School.

== Work ==
Howard-Grenville is known for her work on business sustainability, the future of work, and leadership of change through culture. While at the University of Oregon, Howard-Grenville worked with students on Industrial ecology and implemented projects that would benefit the community.

== Honours and awards ==
In 2010, Howard-Grenville and co-authors received the Academy of Management Division Best Paper Award from the Academy of Management Journal for their paper Sensemaking from the Body: An Enactive Ethnography of Rowing the Amazon. Howard-Grenville was elected a fellow of the Academy of Social Sciences in 2021.

== Selected publications ==
- Howard-Grenville, Jennifer A. (2005). "The Persistence of Flexible Organizational Routines: The Role of Agency and Organizational Context". Organization Science. 16 (6): 618–636. doi:10.1287/orsc.1050.0150. ISSN 1047-7039.
- Parmigiani, Anne; Howard-Grenville, Jennifer (2011). "Routines Revisited: Exploring the Capabilities and Practice Perspectives". Academy of Management Annals. 5 (1): 413–453. doi:10.5465/19416520.2011.589143. ISSN 1941-6520.
- Howard-Grenville, Jennifer; Buckle, Simon J.; Hoskins, Brian J.; George, Gerard (2014). "Climate Change and Management". Academy of Management Journal. 57 (3): 615–623. doi:10.5465/amj.2014.4003. ISSN 0001-4273.
- George, Gerard; Howard-Grenville, Jennifer; Joshi, Aparna; Tihanyi, Laszlo (2016). "Understanding and Tackling Societal Grand Challenges through Management Research". Academy of Management Journal. 59 (6): 1880–1895. doi:10.5465/amj.2016.4007. ISSN 0001-4273.
