= Greenville, New York =

Greenville is the name of some places in the U.S. state of New York:

- Greenville, Orange County, New York, a town
- Greenville, Westchester County, New York, a CDP, commonly known as Edgemont
- Greenville, Greene County, New York, a town
  - Greenville (CDP), Greene County, New York, in the center of that town
- Greenville, New York: fictional town in What Mad Universe
