= Grenville, Grenada =

Grenville
- Town
- Nicknames: La Baye, Rainbow City
- Location within Grenada
- Coordinates: 12°07′09″N 61°37′35″W
- Country: Grenada
- Parish: Saint Andrew
- Elevation: 3.3 ft (1 m)

Population
  - Total: 2,400
- Time zone: UTC-4

Grenville is the third largest town in Grenada, after St. George's and Gouyave and it is the capital of the largest parish, Saint Andrew. It is one of four coastal villages located about halfway up the eastern coast of the Caribbean island of Grenada that make up the Grenville Bay Area.

The town has a population of about 2,400 residents, with many more in the surrounding region. It serves as an economic and transportation hub for that part of the island, and once was home to the largest nutmeg-processing plant in Grenada. The town's marketplace houses a variety of fruit, vegetable, craft and meat stalls. Although open every day, the most popular day for activity is Saturday, the island's traditional 'market day'. A newly opened bus terminal on Sendal Street allows for organized public transportation in the form of minibuses to and from the town.

This town is not only heavily involved in the agriculture export industry, but is also home to some of the island's top institutions. For example, Grenville's Anglican Church and Saint Andrew's Anglican Primary School stand at the north end of Victoria Street, the main thoroughfare along the bay. The St. Andrew's Anglican Secondary School, Grenville Secondary School, St. Joseph's Convent Grenville, the St. Andrew's Methodist School and the St. Andrew's Roman Catholic School, are five other schools located within this town that are all nationally noted for their academic and athletic performance. Overall, this town comprises multiple clothing stores, supermarkets, a fish market, a playing field, and the parish's main judicial institutions: Grenville Magistrate's Court and Grenville Police Station.

Grenville's surrounding villages are also main attractions of St. Andrew. Pearls Airport, Grenada's first airport is on the outskirts of the town. It is no longer used for aviation, but skeletons of abandoned Air Cuba planes are still present. Also, just north of Grenville is one of Grenada's largest playing fields known as Progress Park. Sir Eric Gairy, the first Prime Minister of Grenada, was born in a village just north of Grenville known as Dunfermline.

== History ==
Although founded and named after George Grenville (British Prime Minister, 1763–65), Grenville is also known by locals as La Baye (its former French name translating to "The Beach").

The village "Marquis" was St. Andrew's first town but Grenville has been the parish's new capital since 1796. Its first courthouse was then built on Sendal Street in c.1886, later being rebuilt as Grenville Magistrate's Court on Ben Jones Street in 1981. The cricket ground Progress Park is located in the town and has hosted major cricket matches.

== Education ==
The town of Grenville hosts three secondary schools: the St. Joseph's Convent, the St. Andrew's Anglican Secondary School and the Grenville Secondary School.

- Grenville Secondary School
