= USS Granville =

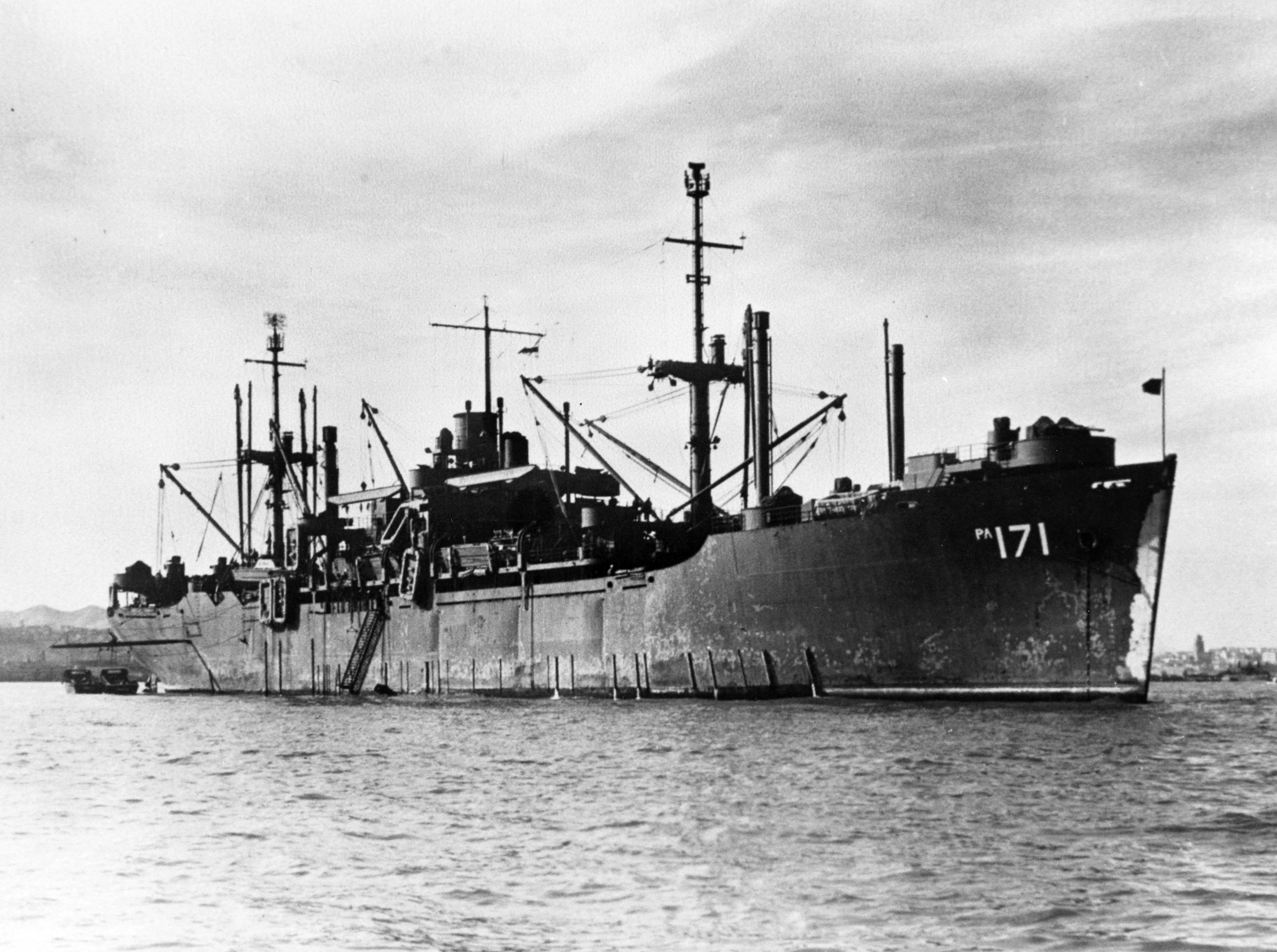
- Granville, probably in San Francisco Bay, 1945 or 1946

History

United States
- Name: USS Granville
- Namesake: Granville County, North Carolina
- Ordered: as type VC2-S-AP5
- Builder: Oregon Shipbuilding Corp
- Laid down: 4 September 1944
- Launched: 23 October 1944
- Acquired: 21 November 1944
- Commissioned: 21 November 1944
- Decommissioned: 10 May 1946
- Stricken: 21 May 1946
- Fate: Sold for scrapping 9 April 1973

General characteristics
- Tonnage: 7,608 GRT
- Displacement: 12,450 tons (full load)
- Length: 455 ft 0 in (138.68 m)
- Beam: 62 ft 0 in (18.90 m)
- Draught: 24 ft 0 in (7.32 m)
- Propulsion: one Westinghouse geared turbine, two Babcock & Wilcox header-type boilers, one propeller, design shaft horsepower 8,500
- Speed: 19 knots
- Boats & landing craft carried: two LCM, twelve LCVP, three LCPU
- Capacity: 150,000 cu. ft, 2,900 tons
- Complement: 56 Officers 480 Enlisted
- Armament: one 5 in (130 mm) gun mount, four 40 mm gun mounts, ten 20 mm gun mounts

USS Granville (APA-171) was a Haskell-class attack transport inservice with the United States Navy from 1944 to 1946. She was scrapped in 1973.

== History ==
Named after a county in North Carolina, Granville (APA-171) was launched 23 October 1944 by the Oregon Shipbuilding Corp., Portland, Oregon, under a United States Maritime Commission contract; sponsored by Mrs. Lowell Stockman; transferred to the Navy 21 November 1944 and commissioned the same day.

=== World War II ===
Granville began her transport duties when she cleared San Francisco, California, 26 January 1945 carrying passengers to Pearl Harbor, the Marshalls, Carolines and Marianas. Departing Honolulu 18 April 1945 Granville sortied from Saipan 2 May to land 1,350 troops of the U.S. 10th Army on Okinawa 6–8 May. Already begun, Okinawa was the climax of America's amphibious sweep across the Pacific Ocean.

Departing Okinawa 15 May 1945 Granville delivered casualties to San Francisco 10 June via Ulithi, Guam and Pearl Harbor. Clearing San Francisco 26 June she called again at Okinawa with more troops. Granville departed Okinawa 23 August and loaded occupation troops at Lingayen Gulf 10–20 September 1945. Putting her troops ashore at Wakayama, Japan, 25 September she called at Mindanao, Philippine Islands, 9–14 October to embark 1,447 troops of the 2d Battalion, 34th Infantry Regiment. Granville sailed from Mindanao 15 October and landed her troops at Matsuyama 21–24 October 1945; part of the U.S. 5th Fleet landing of the U.S. X Corps (Central Occupation Group), U.S. 6th Army in Kyūshū and western Honshū.

Departing Matsuyama, Japan 28 October 1945, Granville was assigned to the "Operation Magic Carpet" fleet carrying veteran troops to the United States from the Solomons, New Guinea, Admiralties, New Hebrides, and New Caledonia. She returned to San Francisco from her last voyage 25 January 1946, sailed from San Francisco 15 February and reached Norfolk, Virginia, 9 March 1946 via the Panama Canal Zone.

=== Decommissioning and fate ===
Granville decommissioned there 10 May 1946. She was returned to the Maritime Commission the next day and her name stricken from the Navy List 21 May 1946. Placed in the National Defense Reserve Fleet, she was berthed in James River, Virginia. She was sold for scrapping in 1973.

== Awards ==
Granville earned one battle star for World War II service. Her crew was eligible for the following medals:

- American Campaign Medal
- Asiatic–Pacific Campaign Medal (1)
- World War II Victory Medal
- Navy Occupation Medal (with Asia Clasp)
