= Grenville Kleiser =

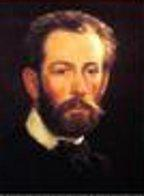
A Portrait of Grenville Kleiser

Grenville Kleiser (1868– 1953) was a North American author. He was the author of a long list of inspirational books and guides to oratorical success and personal development. Kleiser also worked as an instructor in Public Speaking at Yale Divinity School, Yale University.

Kleiser was born in 1868 in Toronto, Ontario, Canada. He married Elizabeth Thompson in 1894. He died on August 27, 1953 in New York City.

== Works ==
- How to Speak in Public (1906)
- Humorous Hits and How to Hold an Audience (1908)
- The World's Great Sermons, Volume 01: Basil to Calvin (1908, as editor)
- The World's Great Sermons, Volume 02: Hooker to South (1908, as editor)
- The World's Great Sermons, Volume 03: Massillon to Mason (1908, as editor)
- The World's Great Sermons, Volume 04: L. Beecher to Bushnell (1908, as editor)
- The World's Great Sermons, Volume 05: Guthrie to Mozley (1908, as editor)
- The World's Great Sermons, Volume 06: H.W. Beecher to Punshon (1908, as editor)
- The World's Great Sermons, Volume 07: Hale to Farrar (1908, as editor)
- The World's Great Sermons, Volume 08: Talmage to Knox Little (1908, as editor)
- The World's Great Sermons, Volume 09: Cuyler to Van Dyke (1908, as editor)
- The World's Great Sermons, Volume 10: Drummond to Jowett - General Index (1908, as editor)
- Fifteen Thousand Useful Phrases (1917)
- How to Argue and Win (1910)
- Stories that Take (1910)
- Phrases for Public Speakers and Paragraphs for Study (1910, as compiler)
- Christ, the Master Speaker (1910, as compiler)
- Helpful Hints on Writing and Reading (1911, as compiler)
- How to Read and Declaim (1911)
- Miscellaneous Studies in Prose (1911, as compiler)
- Richard Chenevix Trench, The Study of Words (1911, condensed by)
- Models for Study (1911, as compiler)
- Kleiser's Complete Guide to Public Speaking (1915)
- Talks on Talking (1916)
- Inspiration and Ideals. Thoughts for Every Day (1917)
- Successful Methods of Public Speaking (1919)
- Model Speeches for Practise (1920, as compiler)
- The Training of a Public Speaker (1920)
- How to Sell Through Speech (1920)
- Impromptu Speeches: How to Make Them (1920)
- Something to Say: and How to Say It (1920)
- Word Power: How to Develop It (1920)
- How to Build Mental Power
- How to Develop Self-confidence in Speech and Manner
- How to Improve Your Conversation
- How to Develop Power and Personality in Speaking
- Great Speeches and How to Make Them
- Make Your Life Worth Living
- Hugh Blair, Lectures on Rhetoric (editor)
- Training for Power and Leadership
- Mail Course in Public Speaking
- Mail Course in Practical English
- Mail Course in Business Success
- George Campbell, The Philosophy of Rhetoric (editor)
- How to Speak Without Notes
- Vital English for Speakers and Writers
- Salesmanship and Advertising
- Daily Steps to Power
- Talks on Efficiency
- Letters that Produce Results
- ’’The Most Vital Thing in Life’’ (poem)
- How to Make and Save Money
- ’’You Can’t Fool God’’ (poem)
