= Granville Mall =

Granville Mall may refer to the following malls in Canada:

- Granville Mall, Halifax
- Granville Mall, Vancouver
