= List of former municipalities in Quebec =

The Province of Quebec currently has 1,128 local municipalities including 233 cities, 655 municipalities and 42 villages, 131 parishes and 42 townships. In addition, there are 662 communities that previously held some form of urban municipality status. These include 176 former cities or towns, 190 regular municipalities, 121 villages, 133 parishes and 41 townships. These communities no longer exist as independent urban municipalities due to amalgamation, annexation or dissolution.

In the context of this list, "annexed" means that the former municipality disappeared after being annexed by an existing municipality or following the creation of a new municipality formed under the bases and with the institutions of an existing municipality. Meanwhile, "merged" means that the former municipality was merged with one or multiple municipalities to form a new municipality. Usually, unlike annexed municipalities, none of the merged municipalities is considered to be the legitimate successor of the new municipality. In both cases, some of these former municipalities still have a special status within the current municipalities that they are part of. For example, like a borough, district or neighbourhood.

== Bas-Saint-Laurent ==
Bas-Saint-Laurent

Former municipality	Former status	Other former name	Disappearance date	Disappearance reason	Population at time of disappearance	Became part of:
Andréville	Village		February 11, 1987	Merged with Saint-André	354	Saint-André_{(Now named Saint-André-de-Kamouraska)}
Cabano	City		May 10, 2010	Merged with Notre-Dame-du-Lac	3,199	Cabano-Notre-Dame-du-Lac_{(Now named Témiscouata-sur-le-Lac)}
Fleuriault	Municipality		January 7, 1989	Annexed	545	Saint-Gabriel_{(Now named Saint-Gabriel-de-Rimouski)}
Le Bic	Municipality		September 16, 2009	Annexed	2,946	Rimouski
Les Boules	Municipality		July 4, 2002	Merged with Métis-sur-Mer	402	Métis-sur-Mer
Luceville	Village		August 29, 2001	Merged with Sainte-Luce	1,421	Sainte-Luce-Luceville_{(Now named Sainte-Luce)}
Mont-Lebel	Municipality		January 1, 2002	Annexed	334	Rimouski
Nazareth	Village		September 16, 1967	Annexed	1,965	Rimouski
Notre-Dame-du-Lac	City		May 10, 2010	Merged with Cabano	2,060	Cabano-Notre-Dame-du-Lac_{(Now named Témiscouata-sur-le-Lac)}
Notre-Dame-du-Sacré-Cœur	Parish		September 16, 1967	Annexed	2,384	Rimouski
Petit-Matane	Municipality		September 26, 2001	Annexed	1,360	Matane
Pointe-au-Père	City	Sainte-Anne-de-la-Pointe-au-Père (1882–1988)	January 1, 2002	Annexed	4,171	Rimouski
Rimouski-Est	Village		January 1, 2002	Annexed	2,058	Rimouski
Saint-Benoît-Joseph-Labre	Parish		January 16, 1991	Annexed	2,191	Amqui
Saint-Edmond	Municipality		December 17, 1997	Merged with Lac-au-Saumon	239	Lac-au-Saumon
Saint-Éleuthère	Municipality	Pohénégamook (1903-1923)	November 3, 1973	Merged with: -Sully -Saint-Pierre-d’Estcourt	1,592	Pohénégamook
Saint-François-Xavier	Parish		April 22, 1892	Dissolved	860	Saint-Modeste and Viger_{(Now named Saint-Épiphane)}
Saint-Georges-de-Cacouna	Parish	Kakonna (1855-1969)	March 22, 2006	Merged with Saint-Georges-de-Cacouna	674	Cacouna
Saint-Georges-de-Cacouna	Village	Saint-Georges-de-Kakouna (1869-1969)	March 22, 2006	Merged with Saint-Georges-de-Cacouna	1,098	Cacouna
Saint-Germain-de-Rimouski	Parish		December 16, 1967	Annexed	297	Rimouski
Saint-Guy	Municipality		July 31, 2024	Merged with Lac-des-Aigles	76	Lac-des-Aigles
Saint-Jacques-le-Majeur-de-Causapscal	Parish		December 31, 1997	Annexed	731	Causapscal
Saint-Jean-Baptiste	Municipality		June 13, 2001	Annexed	759	Mont-Joli
Saint-Jean-Baptiste-de-l'Isle-Verte	Municipality		February 9, 2000	Merged with L'Isle-Verte	596	L'Isle-Verte
Saint-Jérôme-de-Matane	Parish	Matane (1855–1969)	September 26, 2001	Annexed	1,165	Matane
Saint-Joseph-de-la-Rivière-Bleue	Parish		June 14, 1975	Merged with Saint-Joseph-de-la-Rivière-Bleue	691	Rivière-Bleue
Saint-Joseph-de-la-Rivière-Bleue	Village		June 14, 1975	Merged with Saint-Joseph-de-la-Rivière-Bleue	1,429	Rivière-Bleue
Saint-Louis-de-Kamouraska	Parish	Kamouraska (1855-1969)	April 1, 1987	Merged with Kamouraska	358	Kamouraska
Saint-Luc-de-Matane	Municipality	Tessier (1880–1904), Saint-Luc (1904–1997)	September 26, 2001	Annexed	899	Matane
Saint-Mathias-de-Cabano	Parish		July 19, 1969	Annexed	668	Cabano_{(Now part of Témiscouata-sur-le-Lac)}
Saint-Nil	Municipality		December 18, 1982	Merged with Saint-René-de-Matane	0	Saint-René-de-Matane
Saint-Onésime-d'Ixworth	Municipality		September 3, 2025	Annexed	522	La Pocatière
Saint-Patrice-de-la-Rivière-du-Loup	Parish	Rivière-du-Loup (1855–1969)	December 30, 1998	Annexed	3,080	Rivière-du-Loup
Saint-Paulin-Dalibaire	Parish		November 27, 1982	Annexed	0	Les Méchins
Saint-Pierre-d’Estcourt	Parish		November 3, 1973	Merged with: -Saint-Éleuthère -Sully	1,104	Pohénégamook
Saint-Pierre-du-Lac	Parish		December 20, 1986	Merged with Val-Brillant	443	Val-Brillant
Saint-Thomas-de-Cherbourg	Parish		November 27, 1982	Annexed	0	Les Méchins
Saint-Ulric-de-Matane	Parish	Saint-Ulric (1869-1969)	January 12, 2000	Merged with Saint-Ulric	945	Rivière-Blanche_{(Now named Saint-Ulric)}
Sainte-Anne-de-la-Pocatière	Parish		September 3, 2025	Annexed	1,597	La Pocatière
Sainte-Blandine	Parish		January 1, 2002	Annexed	2,218	Rimouski
Sainte-Cécile-du-Bic	Parish		January 29, 1972	Annexed	1,226	Bic_{(Now part of Rimouski)}
Sainte-Marie-de-Sayabec	Parish		December 24, 1982	Merged with Sayabec	452	Sayabec
Sainte-Odile-sur-Rimouski	Parish		January 1, 2002	Annexed	1,463	Rimouski
Sully	Municipality	Escourt (1915-1919), Saint-David-d’Escourt (1919-1966)	November 3, 1973	Merged with: -Saint-Éleuthère -Saint-Pierre-d’Estcourt	1,263	Pohénégamook

== Saguenay–Lac-Saint-Jean ==
Saguenay–Lac-Saint-Jean

Former municipality	Former status	Other former name	Disappearance date	Disappearance reason	Population at time of disappearance	Became part of:
Arvida	City		January 1, 1975	Annexed	18,448	Jonquière_{(Now part of Saguenay)}
Bagotville	Parish	Bagotville-Partie-Nord-Ouest-du-Township-de-Bagot (1859-1954)	January 1, 1976	Merged with: -Bagotville -Port-Alfred -Grande-Baie	3,420	La Baie_{(Now part of Saguenay)}
Bagotville	Town		January 1, 1976	Merged with: -Port-Alfred -Grande-Baie -Bagotville	6,041	La Baie_{(Now part of Saguenay)}
Chicoutimi	City		February 18, 2002	Merged with: -Jonquière -La Baie -Laterrière -Lac-Kénogami -Shipshaw -Tremblay	60,008	Saguenay
Chicoutimi-Nord	City	Sainte-Anne-de-Chicoutimi (1893–1954)	January 1, 1976	Annexed	14,086	Chicoutimi_{(Now part of Saguenay)}
Delisle	Municipality		February 21, 2001	Annexed	4,256	Alma
Dolbeau	City		December 17, 1997	Merged with Mistassini	8,310	Dolbeau-Mistassini
Grande-Baie	Municipality		January 1, 1976	Merged with: -Bagotville -Port-Alfred -Bagotville	1,112	La Baie_{(Now part of Saguenay)}
Hébertville-Station	Village		January 1, 2026	Annexed	1,229	Hébertville
Isle-Maligne	Town		July 6, 1962	Annexed	2,070	Alma
Jeanne-d’Arc	Municipality	Saint-Henri-de-Taillon (1916–1918)	February 19, 1932	Annexed	169	Sainte-Monique
Jonquière	City	Saint-Dominique-de-Jonquière (1904-1912)	February 18, 2002	Merged with: -Chicoutimi -La Baie -Laterrière -Lac-Kénogami -Shipshaw -Tremblay	54,842	Saguenay
Kénogami	City		January 1, 1975	Annexed	10,970	Jonquière_{(Now part of Saguenay)}
La Baie	City		February 18, 2002	Merged with: -Chicoutimi -Jonquière -Laterrière -Lac-Kénogami -Shipshaw -Tremblay	19,940	Saguenay
Lac-à-la-Croix	Municipality		January 6, 1999	Merged with Métabetchouan	1,013	Métabetchouan-Lac-à-la-Croix
Lac-Kénogami	Municipality	Kénogami (1897-1986)	February 18, 2002	Merged with: -Chicoutimi -Jonquière -La Baie -Laterrière -Shipshaw -Tremblay	1,834	Saguenay
Laterrière	City		February 18, 2002	Merged with: -Chicoutimi -Jonquière -La Baie -Lac-Kénogami -Shipshaw -Tremblay	4,969	Saguenay
Métabetchouan	City		January 6, 1999	Merged with Lac-à-la-Croix	3,474	Métabetchouan-Lac-à-la-Croix
Mistassini	City		December 17, 1997	Merged with Dolbeau	6,904	Dolbeau-Mistassini
Naudville	Town		July 6, 1962	Annexed	4,475	Alma
Notre-Dame-d’Hébertville	Village		December 16, 1972	Annexed	1,506	Hébertville
Notre-Dame-de-Laterrière	Parish		December 31, 1983	Merged with Laterrière	3,128	Laterrière_{(Now part of Saguenay)}
Port-Alfred	Town		January 1, 1976	Merged with: -Bagotville -Grande-Baie -Bagotville	9,228	La Baie_{(Now part of Saguenay)}
Racine	Town		January 22, 1944	Annexed	172	Arvida_{(Now part of Saguenay)}
Riverbend	Town		July 6, 1962	Annexed	270	Alma
Rivière-du-Moulin	Town		January 1, 1976	Annexed	4,393	Chicoutimi_{(Now part of Saguenay)}
Saguenay (Note: Not to be confused with the current city of Saguenay)	Town		December 19, 1975	Annexed	39	Chicoutimi_{(Now part of Saguenay)}
Saint-Alexis-de-la-Grande-Baie	Village		June 20, 1953	Annexed	2,974	Port-Alfred_{(Now part of Saguenay)}
Saint-Amédée	Municipality		August 16, 1926	Annexed	889	Péribonka
Saint-André	Municipality		November 29, 1969	Merged with Saint-André	225	Saint-André-du-Lac-Saint-Jean
Saint-André	Village		November 29, 1969	Merged with Saint-André	457	Saint-André-du-Lac-Saint-Jean
Saint-Bruno	Municipality		January 1, 2026	Annexed	2,902	Hébertville
Saint-Cœur-de-Marie	Village		August 25, 1979	Merged with Delisle	1,249	Delisle_{(Now part of Alma)}
Saint-Dominique-de-Jonquière	Parish		January 1, 1975	Annexed	4,596	Jonquière_{(Now part of Saguenay)}
Saint-Jean-Eudes	Village		August 15, 1970	Annexed	2,721	Arvida_{(Now part of Saguenay)}
Saint-Jean-Vianney	Village		July 9, 1977	Annexed	0	Shipshaw_{(Now part of Saguenay)}
Saint-Jérôme	Parish		June 21, 1975	Merged with Saint-Jérôme	1,092	Métabetchouan_{(Now part of Métabetchouan-Lac-à-la-Croix)}
Saint-Jérôme	Village		June 21, 1975	Merged with Saint-Jérôme	1,910	Métabetchouan_{(Now part of Métabetchouan-Lac-à-la-Croix)}
Saint-Joseph-d’Alma	Municipality		January 1, 1976	Annexed	2,334	Alma
Saint-Louis-de-Chambord	Parish	Métabetchouan (1931-1934)	December 8, 1973	Merged with Chambord	748	Chambord
Saint-Méthode	Municipality		June 12, 1996	Annexed	1,048	Saint-Félicien
Saint-Michel-de-Mistassini	Municipality		January 3, 1976	Annexed	1,348	Mistassini_{(Now part of Dolbeau-Mistassini)}
Saint-Thomas-d’Aquin	Municipality		September 25, 1971	Merged with Lac-Bouchette	679	Lac-Bouchette
Sainte-Croix	Parish		January 1, 1976	Merged with Lac-à-la-Croix	655	Lac-à-la-Croix_{(Now part of Métabetchouan-Lac-à-la-Croix)}
Shipshaw	Municipality		February 18, 2002	Merged with: -Chicoutimi -Jonquière -La Baie -Laterrière -Lac-Kénogami -Tremblay	2,878	Saguenay
Tremblay	Township		February 18, 2002	Merged with: -Chicoutimi -Jonquière -La Baie -Laterrière -Lac-Kénogami -Shipshaw	3,579	Saguenay
Val-Jalbert	Village		January 1, 1971	Annexed	27	Saint-Louis-de-Chambord_{(Now part of Chambord)}

== Capitale-Nationale ==
Capitale-Nationale

Former municipality	Former status	Other former name	Disappearance date	Disappearance reason	Population at time of disappearance	Became part of:
Beauport	City		January 1, 2002	Annexed	72,813	Quebec City
Beauport-Ouest	Municipality		January 7, 1967	Annexed	1,484	Beauport_{(Now part of Quebec City)}
Bélair	Town	Saint-Gérard-Magella (1909-1965)	December 29, 1973	Merged with Val-Saint-Michel	4,505	Val-Bélair_{(Now part of Quebec City)}
Cap-à-l'Aigle	Village		December 1, 1999	Merged with: -La Malbaie-Pointe-au-Pic -Rivière-Malbaie -Saint-Fidèle -Sainte-Agnès	713	La Malbaie
Cap-Rouge	City	Saint-Félix-du-Cap-Rouge (1872–1983)	January 1, 2002	Annexed	13,700	Quebec City
Charlesbourg	City		January 1, 2002	Annexed	70,310	Quebec City
Charlesbourg-Est	Municipality	Saint-Charles-de-Charlesbourg (1917–1927)	January 1, 1976	Annexed	1,487	Charlesbourg_{(Now part of Quebec City)}
Charlesbourg-Ouest	Municipality		May 1, 1973	Annexed	1,745	Quebec City
Château-d’Eau	Town		February 20, 1965	Annexed	1,057	Loretteville_{(Now part of Quebec City)}
Courville	Town		January 1, 1976	Annexed	6,222	Beauport_{(Now part of Quebec City)}
Deschambault	Municipality		February 27, 2002	Merged with Grondines	1,263	Deschambault-Grondines
Duberger	Town	La Petite-Rivière (1902–1963)	August 1, 1970	Annexed	8,489	Quebec City
Giffard	City		January 1, 1976	Annexed	13,135	Beauport_{(Now part of Quebec City)}
Grondines	Municipality		February 27, 2002	Merged with Deschambault	702	Deschambault-Grondines
L’Ancienne-Lorette (Note: Not to be confused with the current city of L'Ancienne-Lorette)	Parish		December 26, 1970	Annexed	5,113	Sainte-Foy_{(Now part of Quebec City)}
La Baleine	Municipality		August 23, 2000	Merged with L'Île-aux-Coudres	279	L'Isle-aux-Coudres
La Malbaie (Note: Not to be confused with the current city of La Malbaie)	City		February 15, 1995	Merged with Pointe-au-Pic	3,968	La Malabie-Pointe-au-Pic_{(Now part of La Malbaie)}
La Malbaie-Pointe-au-Pic	City		December 1, 1999	Merged with: -Rivière-Malbaie -Saint-Fidèle -Cap-à-l'Aigle -Sainte-Agnès	4,918	La Malbaie
Lac-Saint-Charles	City		January 1, 2002	Annexed	8,912	Quebec City
Les Écureuils	Municipality	Saint-Jean-Baptiste-des-Écureuils (1855–1949)	January 21, 1967	Annexed	1,067	Donnacona
Les Saules	Town	Sainte-Monique-des-Saules (1953–1960)	January 1, 1970	Annexed	6,242	Quebec City
Limoilou	Town		December 30, 1909	Annexed	1,006	Quebec City
Loretteville	City	Saint-Ambroise (1904–1913)	January 1, 2002	Annexed	13,737	Quebec City
Montcalm	Town	Quebec (1855–1908)	January 1, 1913	Annexed	3,899	Quebec City
Montmorency	Town		January 1, 1976	Annexed	4,949	Beauport_{(Now part of Quebec City)}
Neufchâtel	Town	Saint-Ambroise (1855–1963)	January 1, 1971	Annexed	6,618	Quebec City
Notre-Dame-de-Portneuf	Parish		July 4, 2002	Annexed	1,659	Portneuf
Notre-Dame-des-Laurentides	Town		January 1, 1976	Annexed	5,080	Charlesbourg_{(Now part of Quebec City)}
Orsainville	Town		January 1, 1976	Annexed	12,520	Charlesbourg_{(Now part of Quebec City)}
Pointe-au-Pic	Village		February 15, 1995	Merged with La Malbaie	952	La Malabie-Pointe-au-Pic_{(Now part of La Malbaie)}
Pointe-aux-Trembles	Parish		January 2, 1997	Merged with Neuville	2,248	Neuville
Rivière-du-Gouffre	Municipality		January 3, 1996	Annexed	1,305	Baie-Saint-Paul
Rivière-Malbaie	Municipality		December 1, 1999	Merged with: -La Malbaie-Pointe-au-Pic -Saint-Fidèle -Cap-à-l'Aigle -Sainte-Agnès	2,022	La Malbaie
Saint-Basile-Sud	Village		March 1, 2000	Merged with Saint-Basile	1,684	Saint-Basile
Saint-Bernard-de-l'Île-aux-Coudres	Municipality		January 5, 1994	Merged with Saint-Louis-de-l'Isle-aux-Coudres	651	L'Île-aux-Coudres
Saint-Casimir-Est	Village		July 25, 1981	Merged with Saint-Casimir	396	Saint-Casimir
Saint-Charles-des-Grondines	Parish	Grondines (1855-1969)	April 21, 1984	Merged with Saint-Charles-des-Grondines	328	Grondines_{(Now part of Deschambault-Grondines)}
Saint-Charles-des-Grondines	Village		April 21, 1984	Merged with Saint-Charles-des-Grondines	364	Grondines_{(Now part of Deschambault-Grondines)}
Saint-Émile	City		January 1, 2002	Annexed	10,940	Quebec City
Saint-Étienne-de-la-Malbaie	Municipality	Saint-Étienne-de-Murray-Bay (1855–1957)	August 14, 1965	Annexed	1,171	La Malbaie
Saint-Fidèle	Municipality	Saint-Fidèle-de-Mont-Murray (1855-1997)	December 1, 1999	Merged with: -La Malbaie-Pointe-au-Pic -Rivière-Malbaie -Cap-à-l'Aigle -Sainte-Agnès	946	La Malbaie
Saint-Gabriel-Ouest	Municipality		October 5, 1985	Annexed	220	Saint-Gabriel-de-Valcartier
Saint-Joseph-de-Deschambault	Parish	Deschambault (1855-1969)	December 27, 1989	Merged with Deschambault	358	Deschambault_{(Now part of Deschambault-Grondines)}
Saint-Joseph-de-la-Rive	Village		September 19, 2001	Annexed	204	Les Éboulements
Saint-Louis-de-l'Isle-aux-Coudres	Parish		January 5, 1994	Merged with Saint-Bernard-de-l'Île-aux-Coudres	450	L'Île-aux-Coudres
Saint-Malo	Village		April 14, 1908	Annexed		Quebec City
Saint-Michel-Archange	Municipality		January 1, 1976	Annexed	4,069	Beauport_{(Now part of Quebec City)}
Saint-Sauveur-de-Québec	Village	Saint-Roch (1855–1872), Saint-Sauveur (1872–1887)	September 27, 1889	Annexed	12,846	Quebec City
Sainte-Agnès	Parish		December 1, 1999	Merged with: -La Malbaie-Pointe-au-Pic -Rivière-Malbaie -Saint-Fidèle -Cap-à-l'Aigle	675	La Malbaie
Sainte-Foy	City		January 1, 2002	Annexed	72,547	Quebec City
Sainte-Jeanne-de-Pont-Rouge	Municipality	Sainte-Jeanne-de-Neuville (1868-1957)	January 3, 1996	Merged with Pont-Rouge	1,966	Pont-Rouge
Sainte-Thérèse-de-Lisieux	Municipality	Beauport (1855–1945)	January 1, 1976	Annexed	2,723	Beauport_{(Now part of Quebec City)}
Sillery	City	Saint-Colomb-de-Sillery (1856–1947)	January 1, 2002	Annexed	11,909	Quebec City
Val-Bélair	City		January 1, 2002	Annexed	21,332	Quebec City
Val-Saint-Michel	Town		December 29, 1973	Merged with Bélair	2,050	Val-Bélair_{(Now part of Quebec City)}
Vanier	City	Québec-Ouest (1916–1966)	January 1, 2002	Annexed	11,054	Quebec City
Villeneuve	Town	Beauport-Est (1921–1951)	January 1, 1976	Annexed	4,062	Beauport_{(Now part of Quebec City)}

== Mauricie ==
Mauricie

Former municipality	Former status	Other former name	Disappearance date	Disappearance reason	Population at time of disappearance	Became part of:
Baie-de-Shawinigan	Village		September 2, 1998	Annexed	265	Shawinigan
Belleau	Municipality		April 21, 1984	Merged with Saint-Alexis	10	Saint-Alexis-des-Monts
Cap-de-la-Madeleine	City		January 1, 2002	Annexed	32,534	Trois-Rivières
Est-de-la-Paroisse-de-Sainte-Flore	Municipality		May 10, 1930	Annexed	1,334	Grand-Mère_{(Now part of Shawinigan)}
Fermont	Village		March 30, 1939	Annexed	30	Saint-Maurice
Grand-Mère	City		January 1, 2002	Annexed	13,179	Shawinigan
Haute-Mauricie	Municipality		August 25, 1993	Annexed	2,574	La Tuque
Hunterstown	Township		February 27, 1988	Merged with: -Saint-Paulin -Saint-Paulin	219	Saint-Paulin
La Croche	Municipality	Langelier (1921–1999)	March 26, 2003	Annexed	549	La Tuque
La Pérade	Village		May 10, 1989	Merged with Sainte-Anne-de-la-Pérade	944	Sainte-Anne-de-la-Pérade
La Visitation-de-Champlain	Parish		December 11, 1982	Merged with Champlain	1,014	Champlain
La Visitation-de-la-Pointe-du-Lac	Municipality	Pointe-du-Lac (1955–1969)	February 11, 1978	Annexed	1,385	Pointe-du-Lac_{(Now part of Trois-Rivières)}
Lac-à-la-Tortue	Parish	Saint-Théophile (1895–1981)	January 1, 2002	Annexed	3,039	Shawinigan
Montauban	Village		January 3, 1976	Merged with Notre-Dame-des-Anges	246	Notre-Dame-de-Montauban
Notre-Dame-des-Anges	Village		January 3, 1976	Merged with Montauban	790	Notre-Dame-de-Montauban
Notre-Dame-des-Anges-de-Montauban	Parish		June 7, 1969	Annexed	240	Notre-Dame-des-Anges_{(Now part of Notre-Dame-de-Montauban)}
Parent	Village		March 26, 2003	Annexed	326	La Tuque
Pointe-du-Lac	Municipality		January 1, 2002	Annexed	6,902	Trois-Rivières
Saint-Alexis	Parish		April 21, 1984	Merged with Belleau	2,478	Saint-Alexis-des-Monts
Saint-Antoine-de-la-Rivière-du-Loup	Municipality	Rivière-du-Loup-en-Haut (1855–1969)	December 31, 1988	Annexed	4,505	Louiseville
Saint-Georges	Village	Turcotte (1915–1919)	January 1, 2002	Annexed	3,854	Shawinigan
Saint-Gérard-des-Laurentides	Parish		January 1, 2002	Annexed	2,176	Shawinigan
Saint-Jean-des-Piles	Parish		January 1, 2002	Annexed	713	Shawinigan
Saint-Joseph-de-Maskinongé	Parish	Maskinongé (1855-1969)	April 25, 2001	Merged with Maskinongé	1,151	Maskinongé
Saint-Louis-de-France	City	Saint-Louis (1904–1969)	January 1, 2002	Annexed	7,246	Trois-Rivières
Saint-Michel-des-Forges	Municipality		December 30, 1961	Annexed	1,789	Trois-Rivières
Sainte-Anne-d’Yamachiche	Parish	Yamachiche (1855-1969)	December 26, 1987	Merged with Yamachiche	1,489	Yamachiche
Sainte-Flore	Parish		March 28, 1970	Annexed	1,800	Grand-Mère_{(Now part of Shawinigan)}
Sainte-Marthe-du-Cap	City	Sainte-Marthe-du-Cap-de-la-Madeleine (1916–1993)	January 1, 2002	Annexed	6,162	Trois-Rivières
Shawinigan-Est	Village		February 13, 1925	Annexed		Shawinigan Falls_{(Now named Shawinigan)}
Shawinigan-Est	Village		August 31, 1957	Annexed	2,451	Shawinigan Falls_{(Now named Shawinigan)}
Shawinigan-Sud	City	Almaville (1912–1948)	January 1, 2002	Annexed	11,544	Shawinigan
Trois-Rivières-Ouest	City	Trois-Rivières (1855–1963)	January 1, 2002	Annexed	23,287	Trois-Rivières
Tuque Falls	Village		March 24, 1911	Merged with La Tuque		La Tuque

== Estrie ==
Estrie

Former municipality	Former status	Other former name	Disappearance date	Disappearance reason	Population at time of disappearance	Became part of:
Agnès	Village		March 14, 1907	Merged with Mégantic	288	Mégantic_{(Now named Lac-Mégantic)}
Ascot	Municipality		January 1, 2002	Annexed	6,908	Sherbrooke
Barford	Township		December 30, 1998	Annexed	656	Coaticook
Barnston	Township		December 30, 1998	Annexed	1,500	Coaticook
Beebe Plain	Village		February 15, 1995	Merged with: -Rock Island -Stanstead Plain	975	Stanstead
Bishopton	Village	Bishop's Crossing (1917-1932)	October 11, 1995	Merged with: -Marbleton -Dudswell	352	Dudswell
Brome (Note: Not to be confused with the current municipality of Brome)	Township		January 2, 1971	Merged with: -Foster -Knowlton	1,763	Lac-Brome
Brompton	Township		December 30, 1998	Annexed	2,157	Bromptonville_{(Now part of Sherbrooke)}
Brompton Gore	Municipality		February 15, 1995	Annexed	422	Racine
Bromptonville	City	Brompton Falls (1902–1903)	January 1, 2002	Annexed	5,571	Sherbrooke
Clifton-Partie-Est	Township	Clifton (1874-1969)	December 24, 1997	Merged with Saint-Isidore-d'Auckland	374	Saint-Isidore-de-Clifton
Compton-Station	Municipality		December 8, 1999	Annexed	858	Compton
Cookshire	City		July 24, 2002	Merged with Eaton	1,543	Cookshire-Eaton
Courcelles	Municipality		January 1, 2024	Merged with Saint-Évariste-de-Forsyth	814	Courcelles-Saint-Évariste
Deauville	Municipality	Petit-Lac-Magog (1917–1945)	January 1, 2002	Annexed	2,895	Sherbrooke
Ditton	Township	Ditton-et-Clinton (1876-1880)	December 24, 1997	Merged with La Patrie	519	La Patrie
Eaton	Municipality		July 24, 2002	Merged with Cookshire	2,766	Cookshire-Eaton
Fleurimont	City	Ascot Nord (1937–1971)	January 1, 2002	Annexed	16,521	Sherbrooke
Fontainebleau	Municipality	Saint-Raymond-de-Pennafort-de-Weedon (1915–1957)	December 24, 1997	Annexed	137	Weedon
Foster	Village		January 2, 1971	Merged with: -Knowlton -Brome	523	Lac-Brome
Gayhurst-Partie-Sud-Est	Township	Gayhurst (1905-1969)	February 25, 1998	Merged with: -Risborough -Saint-Ludger	187	Saint-Ludger
Hatley-Partie-Ouest	Township	Hatley (1917-1969)	September 27, 1995	Merged with Hatley	476	Hatley
Knowlton	Village		January 2, 1971	Merged with: -Foster -Brome	1,486	Lac-Brome
Lennoxville	City		January 1, 2002	Annexed	4,963	Sherbrooke
Marbleton	Village		October 11, 1995	Merged with: -Bishopton -Dudswell	477	Dudswell
Melbourne (Note: Not to be confused with the current township of Melbourne)	Village		December 29, 1999	Annexed	531	Richmond
New Rockland	Village		May 18, 1926	Annexed	81	Kingsbury
Omerville	Village		October 9, 2002	Annexed	2,361	Magog
Philipsburg	Village		February 3, 1999	Annexed	245	Saint-Armand
Rainville	Municipality	Farnham-Ouest (1855–1962)	March 8, 2000	Annexed	1,855	Farnham
Risborough	Municipality	Risborough-et-Marlow (1900-1969), Risborough-et-Partie-de-Marlow (1969-1992)	February 25, 1998	Merged with: -Saint-Ludger -Gayhurst-Partie-Sud-Est	942	Saint-Ludger
Rock Forest	City		January 1, 2002	Annexed	18,667	Sherbrooke
Rock Island	City		February 15, 1995	Merged with: -Beebe Plain -Stanstead Plain	1,067	Stanstead
Saint-Élie-d’Orford	Municipality		January 1, 2002	Dissolved	7,947	Sherbrooke, Saint-Denis-de-Brompton and Orford
Saint-Gérard	Village	Lac-Weedon (1886–1924)	February 9, 2000	Annexed	514	Weedon
Saint-Grégoire-de-Greenlay	Village		December 29, 1999	Annexed	611	Windsor
Saint-Isidore-d'Auckland	Municipality	Auckland (1870-1964)	December 24, 1997	Merged with Clifton-Partie-Est	604	Saint-Isidore-de-Clifton
Saint-Mathieu-de-Dixville	Municipality		September 27, 1995	Merged with Dixville	356	Dixville
Sawyerville	Village		April 25, 2001	Merged with Eaton	832	Eaton_{(Now part of Cookshire-Eaton)}
Shefford-Ouest	Village		August 20, 1966	Annexed	406	Bromont
Shipton	Municipality		March 17, 1999	Annexed	2,914	Danville
Stanstead Plain	Village		February 15, 1995	Merged with: -Rock Island -Beebe Plain	1,059	Stanstead
Stukely	Municipality	South Stukely (1855-1969), Stukely-Sud (1969-1993)	May 30, 2001	Merged with Eastman	444	Eastman
Sweetsburgh	Village		February 1, 1964	Annexed	958	Cowansville
Trois-Lacs	Municipality	La Rochelle (1950–1961)	December 8, 1999	Annexed	502	Asbestos_{(Now named Val-des-Sources)}
Weedon-Centre	Village		December 11, 1996	Merged with Weedon	1,195	Weedon
Wottonville	Village		March 10, 1993	Merged with Wotton	627	Wotton

== Montréal ==
Montréal

Former municipality	Former status	Other former name	Disappearance date	Disappearance reason	Population at time of disappearance	Became part of:
Ahuntsic	Village		June 4, 1910	Annexed	366	Montreal
Anjou	City	Saint-Léonard-de-Port-Maurice (1916–1956)	January 1, 2002	Annexed	38,015	Montréal
Beaurivage-de-la-Longue-Pointe	Village		June 4, 1910	Annexed	873	Montreal
Bordeaux	Town	Saint-Joseph-de-Bordeaux (1898–1906)	June 4, 1910	Annexed	491	Montreal
Bout-de-l’Isle	Municipality		March 28, 1964	Annexed	1,666	Sainte-Anne-de-Bellevue
Cartierville	Town		December 22, 1916	Annexed	905	Montreal
Côte-de-Liesse	Parish	La Présentation-de-la-Sainte-Vierge (1895–1954)	April 1, 1958	Dissolved	165	Dorval, Lachine_{(Now part of Montréal)} and Saint-Laurent_{(Now part of Montréal)}
Côte-des-Neiges	Town	Notre-Dame-des-Neiges-Ouest (1889–1907)	June 4, 1910	Annexed	401	Montreal
Côte-Saint-Louis	Town		December 19, 1893	Annexed	2,972	Montreal
L'Île-Bizard	City	Saint-Raphaël-de-l’Île-Bizard (1955–1995)	January 1, 2002	Annexed	13,861	Montréal
Lachine	City		January 1, 2002	Annexed	40,222	Montréal
LaSalle	City	Lachine (1855–1886), Saints-Anges-de-Lachine (1886–1912)	January 1, 2002	Annexed	73,983	Montréal
Laval-de-Montréal	Town	Pointe-aux-Trembles (1855–1916)	January 1, 1925	Annexed	539	Pointe-aux-Trembles_{(Now part of Montréal)}
Longue-Pointe	Town		June 4, 1910	Annexed	2,519	Montreal
Lorimier	Village	La Côte-la-Visitation (1871–1895)	May 29, 1909	Annexed	1,279	Montreal
Maisonneuve	City	Hochelaga (1863–1883)	February 9, 1918	Annexed	18,684	Montreal
Montréal-Nord	City	La Visitation-du-Sault-au-Récollet (1855–1915)	January 1, 2002	Annexed	83,600	Montréal
Notre-Dame	Municipality	Montréal (1855–1870)	June 10, 1884	Annexed	11,405	Notre-Dame-de-Grâce-Ouest_{(Now part of Montréal)}
Notre-Dame-de-Grâce	Town	Notre-Dame-de-Grâce-Ouest (1876–1906)	June 4, 1910	Annexed	2,225	Montreal
Notre-Dame-de-Liesse	Parish		March 28, 1964	Annexed	1,164	Saint-Laurent_{(Now part of Montréal)}
Notre-Dame-des-Neiges	Town	Côte-des-Neiges (1863–1889)	April 25, 1908	Annexed	1,156	Montreal
Outremont	City		January 1, 2002	Annexed	22,933	Montréal
Pierrefonds	City	Sainte-Geneviève (1855–1958)	January 1, 2002	Annexed	54,963	Montréal
Pointe-aux-Trembles	City	Saint-Jean-Baptiste-de-la-Pointe-aux-Trembles (1905–1912)	July 17, 1982	Annexed	36,270	Montreal
Rivière-des-Prairies	Town		July 20, 1963	Annexed	10,054	Montréal
Rosemont	Village	Petite-Côte (1895–1905)	June 4, 1910	Annexed	315	Montreal
Roxboro	City		January 1, 2002	Annexed	5,642	Montréal
Saint-Gabriel	Village		January 1, 1887	Annexed	4,506	Montreal
Saint-Henri	City		October 30, 1905	Annexed	21,192	Montreal
Saint-Jean-Baptiste	Town		January 15, 1886	Annexed	5,874	Montreal
Saint-Jean-de-Dieu	Parish		January 1, 1981	Annexed	2,826	Montreal
Saint-Laurent	City		January 1, 2002	Annexed	77,391	Montréal
Saint-Léonard	City	Saint-Léonard-de-Port-Maurice (1886–1962)	January 1, 2002	Annexed	69,604	Montréal
Saint-Louis	Town	Saint-Louis-du-Mile-End (1878–1895)	December 31, 1900	Annexed	3,537	Montreal
Saint-Michel	City	Saint-Michel-de-Laval (1912–1915)	October 24, 1968	Annexed	71,446	Montréal
Saint-Paul	Town	Côte-Saint-Paul (1875–1897)	June 4, 1910	Annexed	1,496	Montreal
Saint-Pierre	City	Saint-Pierre-aux-Liens (1894–1908)	January 1, 2000	Annexed	4,739	Lachine_{(Now part of Montréal)}
Sainte-Cunégonde-de-Montréal	City	Sainte-Cunégonde (1876–1890)	December 4, 1905	Annexed	10,912	Montreal
Sainte-Geneviève	Village		June 18, 1935	Annexed	286	Sainte-Geneviève-de-Pierrefonds_{(Now part of Montréal)}
Sainte-Geneviève	City	Sainte-Geneviève-de-Pierrefonds (1904–1959)	January 1, 2002	Annexed	3,278	Montréal
Saraguay	Village		April 25, 1964	Annexed	443	Montreal
Sault-au-Récollet	Town		December 22, 1916	Annexed	1,311	Montreal
Summerlea	Town		December 21, 1912	Annexed	161	Lachine_{(Now part of Montréal)}
Tétreaultville-de-Montréal	Village		June 4, 1910	Annexed		Montreal
Verdun	City	La Rivière-Saint-Pierre (1875–1876)	January 1, 2002	Annexed	60,564	Montréal
Ville-Émard	Town	Côte-Saint-Paul (1878–1902), Boulevard-Saint-Paul (1902–1908)	June 4, 1910	Annexed	241	Montreal
Villeray	Village		September 11, 1905	Annexed	509	Montreal

== Outaouais ==
Outaouais

Former municipality	Former status	Other former name	Disappearance date	Disappearance reason	Population at time of disappearance	Became part of:
Aldfield	Township		January 1, 1975	Merged with: -Sainte-Cécile-de-Masham -Wakefield -Masham-Nord -Wakefield	546	La Pêche
Aylmer	City	Lucerne (1975–1976)	January 1, 2002	Annexed	36,085	Gatineau
Aylmer	Town		January 1, 1975	Merged with: -Lucerne -Deschênes	7,198	Lucerne_{(Now part of Gatineau)}
Buckingham	City		January 1, 2002	Annexed	11,668	Gatineau
Cameron	Township		March 22, 1980	Merged with Bouchette	234	Bouchette
Chapeau	Village		December 30, 1998	Merged with: -L'Isle-aux-Allumettes -L'Isle-aux-Allumettes-Partie-Est	442	L'Isle-aux-Allumettes
Deschênes	Village		January 1, 1975	Merged with: -Aylmer -Lucerne	1,806	Lucerne_{(Now part of Gatineau)}
Eardley	Township		January 1, 1975	Merged with: -Quyon -Onslow -Onslow-Partie-Sud	1,222	Pontiac
Hull	City		January 1, 2002	Annexed	66,246	Gatineau
L'Isle-aux-Allumettes-Partie-Est	Township		December 30, 1998	Merged with: -Chapeau -L'Isle-aux-Allumettes	450	L'Isle-aux-Allumettes
Lytton	Township		September 19, 2001	Merged with Montcerf	252	Montcerf-Lytton
Masham-Nord	Township	Masham (1855-1969)	January 1, 1975	Merged with: -Sainte-Cécile-de-Masham -Wakefield -Aldfield -Wakefield	347	La Pêche
Masson-Angers	City	Masson (1980–1992)	January 1, 2002	Annexed	9,799	Gatineau
Montcerf	Municipality		September 19, 2001	Merged with Lytton	474	Montcerf-Lytton
Northfield	Municipality		March 13, 2002	Merged with: -Gracefield -Wright	521	Wright-Gracefield-Northfield_{(Now named Gracefield)}
Onslow	Township		January 1, 1975	Merged with: -Quyon -Eardley -Onslow-Partie-Sud	217	Pontiac
Onslow-Partie-Sud	Township	Onslow (1876-1969)	January 1, 1975	Merged with: -Quyon -Eardley -Onslow	592	Pontiac
Perkins	Municipality	Templeton-Nord (1908-1960)	January 1, 1975	Merged with: -Portland-Ouest -Wakefield-Partie-Est	1,461	Val-des-Monts
Pointe-Gatineau	Town		January 1, 1975	Annexed	15,640	Gatineau
Portland-Ouest	Municipality	Portland (1906-1953)	January 1, 1975	Merged with: -Perkins -Wakefield-Partie-Est	409	Val-des-Monts
Quyon	Village		January 1, 1975	Merged with: -Eardley -Onslow -Onslow-Partie-Sud	879	Pontiac
Sainte-Angélique	Parish		November 29, 2000	Merged with Papineauville	634	Papineauville
Sainte-Cécile-de-Masham	Municipality	Partie-Sud-du-Canton-de-Masham (1913-1940)	January 1, 1975	Merged with: -Wakefield -Aldfield -Masham-Nord -Wakefield	2,111	La Pêche
Templeton	Village		January 1, 1975	Annexed	3,684	Gatineau
Templeton-Est	Municipality		January 1, 1975	Annexed	1,977	Gatineau
Templeton-Est-Partie-Est	Municipality		January 1, 1975	Annexed	253	Gatineau
Templeton-Ouest	Municipality		January 1, 1975	Annexed	1,030	Gatineau
Touraine	City	Hull (1889–1966)	January 1, 1975	Annexed	9,643	Gatineau
Vinoy	Municipality	Suffolk (1920-1923)	August 21, 1996	Merged with Chénéville	125	Chénéville
Wakefield	Township		January 1, 1975	Merged with: -Sainte-Cécile-de-Masham -Wakefield -Aldfield -Masham-Nord	1,039	La Pêche
Wakefield	Village		January 1, 1975	Merged with: -Sainte-Cécile-de-Masham -Aldfield -Masham-Nord -Wakefield	325	La Pêche
Wakefield-Partie-Est	Municipality	Wakefield (1892-1969)	January 1, 1975	Merged with: -Perkins -Portland-Ouest	746	Val-des-Monts
Wright	Township		March 13, 2002	Merged with: -Northfield -Gracefield	1,137	Wright-Gracefield-Northfield_{(Now named Gracefield)}

== Abitibi-Témiscamingue ==
Abitibi-Témiscamingue

Former municipality	Former status	Other former name	Disappearance date	Disappearance reason	Population at time of disappearance	Became part of:
Amos-Est	Municipality	Figuery-et-Dalquier (1918-1950)	January 17, 1987	Annexed	4,241	Amos
Amos-Ouest	Municipality	Figuery-et-Dalquier (1917–1949)	February 9, 1974	Annexed	2,087	Amos
Angliers	Village		January 1, 2018	Merged with Laverlochère	303	Laverlochère-Angliers
Arntfield	Municipality		January 1, 2002	Annexed	471	Rouyn-Noranda
Barville	Town		February 11, 1978	Merged with Fiedmont	84	Fiedmont-et-Barraute_{(Now part of Barraute)}
Beaudry	Municipality		February 9, 2000	Annexed	1,139	Rouyn-Noranda
Bellecombe	Municipality		January 1, 2002	Annexed	731	Rouyn-Noranda
Bourlamaque	Town		October 12, 1968	Annexed	4,122	Val-d'Or
Cadillac	City		January 1, 2002	Annexed	828	Rouyn-Noranda
Cléricy	Municipality	Saint-Joseph-de-Cléricy (1978–1998)	January 1, 2002	Annexed	481	Rouyn-Noranda
Cloutier	Municipality		January 1, 2002	Annexed	351	Rouyn-Noranda
Colombourg	Municipality		March 6, 2002	Annexed	749	Macamic
D'Alembert	Municipality		January 1, 2002	Annexed	920	Rouyn-Noranda
Destor	Municipality		January 1, 2002	Annexed	391	Rouyn-Noranda
Dubuisson	Municipality		January 1, 2002	Annexed	1,686	Val-d'Or
Évain	Municipality		January 1, 2002	Annexed	3,750	Rouyn-Noranda
Fiedmont	Municipality	Fiedmont-et-Barraute (1918-1969)	February 11, 1978	Merged with Barville	857	Fiedmont-et-Barraute_{(Now part of Barraute)}
Fiedmont-et-Barraute	Municipality		January 5, 1994	Merged with Barraute	1,023	Barraute
La Morandière	Municipality		January 1, 2023	Merged with Rochebaucourt	205	La Morandière-Rochebaucourt
Lac-Dufault	Municipality		January 29, 1997	Annexed	978	Rouyn-Noranda
Lac-Lemoine	Municipality		October 12, 1968	Annexed	1,983	Val-d'Or
Laverlochère	Municipality	Saint-Isidore (1912-1977)	January 1, 2018	Merged with Angliers	675	Laverlochère-Angliers
Letang	Municipality		March 26, 1988	Annexed	475	Témiscaming
McWatters	Municipality	Kinojévis (1979–1981)	January 1, 2002	Annexed	1,815	Rouyn-Noranda
Mercier	Town		March 11, 1948	Merged with Rouyn	347	Rouyn_{(Now part of Rouyn-Noranda)}
Mont-Brun	Municipality	Saint-Norbert-de-Mont-Brun (1978–1997)	January 1, 2002	Annexed	519	Rouyn-Noranda
Montbeillard	Municipality		January 1, 2002	Annexed	728	Rouyn-Noranda
Noranda	City		July 5, 1986	Merged with Rouyn	8,767	Rouyn-Noranda
Notre-Dame-de-Lourdes-de-Lorrainville	Parish		February 16, 1994	Merged with Lorrainville	391	Lorrainville
Notre-Dame-des-Quinze-du-Canton-Guigues	Municipality	Guigues (1913)	January 1, 1952	Annexed	495	Notre-Dame-du-Nord
Rochebaucourt	Municipality		January 1, 2023	Merged with La Morandière	146	La Morandière-Rochebaucourt
Rollet	Municipality		January 1, 2002	Annexed	356	Rouyn-Noranda
Rouyn	City		July 5, 1986	Merged with Noranda	17,224	Rouyn-Noranda
Saint-Félix-de-Dalquier	Municipality		January 1, 2025	Annexed	1,026	Amos
Saint-Guillaume-de-Granada	Municipality		December 13, 1995	Annexed	2,573	Rouyn-Noranda
Sullivan	Municipality		January 1, 2002	Annexed	3,529	Val-d'Or
Val-Senneville	Municipality	Pascalis (1940–1980)	January 1, 2002	Annexed	2,479	Val-d'Or
Vassan	Municipality		January 1, 2002	Annexed	988	Val-d'Or

== Côte-Nord ==
Côte-Nord

Former municipality	Former status	Other former name	Disappearance date	Disappearance reason	Population at time of disappearance	Became part of:
Bergeronnes	Township		December 29, 1999	Merged with Grandes-Bergeronnes	212	Les Bergeronnes
De Grasse	City		September 8, 1984	Annexed	278	Moisie_{(Now part of Sept-Îles)}
Gagnon	City		May 31, 1991	Dissolved	4	
Gallix	Municipality		February 12, 2003	Annexed	671	Sept-Îles
Grandes-Bergeronnes	Village		December 29, 1999	Merged with Bergeronnes	601	Les Bergeronnes
Hauterive	City		January 1, 1983	Annexed	13,995	Baie-Comeau
Les Sept-Cantons-Unis-du-Saguenay	United Townships		January 1, 1989	Dissolved	0	
Letellier	Township		January 1, 1989	Dissolved	86	
Moisie	City		February 12, 2003	Annexed	930	Sept-Îles
Rivière-Pentecôte	Municipality		February 19, 2003	Annexed	622	Port-Cartier
Rivière-Pigou	Municipality		October 29, 1983	Merged with Moisie	43	Moisie_{(Now part of Sept-Îles)}
Sacré-Coeur-de-Jésus	Parish	Tadoussac (1863-1927)	June 30, 1973	Merged with Sacré-Coeur-de-Jésus-Village	562	Sacré-Coeur
Sacré-Coeur-de-Jésus-Village	Municipality		June 30, 1973	Merged with Sacré-Coeur-de-Jésus	1,252	Sacré-Coeur
Saint-Luc-de-Laval	Municipality		January 5, 1980	Annexed	2,539	Forestville
Saint-Paul-du-Nord	Municipality	Saint-Paul-de-Mille-Vaches (1898-1931)	May 28, 1997	Merged with Sault-au-Mouton	767	Saint-Paul-du-Nord-Sault-au-Mouton_{(Now named Longue-Rive)}
Sault-au-Mouton	Village		May 28, 1997	Merged with Saint-Paul-du-Nord	643	Saint-Paul-du-Nord-Sault-au-Mouton_{(Now named Longue-Rive)}
Tadoussac (Note: Not to be confused with the current municipality of Tadoussac)	Parish		April 9, 1949	Dissolved	176	

== Gaspésie–Îles-de-la-Madeleine ==
Gaspésie–Îles-de-la-Madeleine

Former municipality	Former status	Other former name	Disappearance date	Disappearance reason	Population at time of disappearance	Became part of:
Baie-de-Gaspé-Nord	Township		January 1, 1971	Annexed	488	Gaspé
Baie-de-Gaspé-Sud	Municipality		January 1, 1971	Annexed	1,013	Gaspé
Barachois	Municipality	Saint-Pierre-de-la-Malbaie-Numéro-Un (1876-1953)	January 1, 1971	Merged with: -Bridgeville -Cap-d’Espoir -Percé -Saint-Pierre-de-la-Malbaie-Numéro-Deux	571	Percé
Bassin	Municipality	Havre-Aubert (1875-1959)	January 1, 1972	Merged with Havre-Aubert	1,797	Île-du-Havre-Aubert_{(Now part of Les Îles-de-la-Madeleine)}
Bridgeville	Municipality		January 1, 1971	Merged with: -Barachois -Cap-d’Espoir -Percé -Saint-Pierre-de-la-Malbaie-Numéro-Deux	1,018	Percé
Cap-aux-Meules	Village		January 1, 2002	Merged with: -Fatima -Grande-Entrée -Havre-aux-Maison -L’Étang-du-Nord -L’Île-du-Havre-Aubert	1,659	Les Îles-de-la-Madeleine
Cap-d’Espoir	Municipality	Anse-du-Cap (1868-1935)	January 1, 1971	Merged with: -Barachois -Bridgeville -Percé -Saint-Pierre-de-la-Malbaie-Numéro-Deux	1,649	Percé
Capucins	Municipality	Romieux (1914–1953)	March 15, 2000	Annexed	280	Cap-Chat
Carleton	City		October 4, 2000	Merged with Saint-Omer	2,886	Carleton-Saint-Omer_{(Now named Carleton-sur-Mer)}
Carleton-sur-Mer (Note: Not to be confused with the current city of Carleton-sur-Mer)	Municipality		August 26, 1972	Merged with Carleton	1,384	Carleton_{(Now part of Carleton-sur-Mer)}
Douglas	Township		January 1, 1971	Annexed	898	Gaspé
Fatima	Municipality		January 1, 2002	Merged with: -Grande-Entrée -Havre-aux-Maisons -L’Étang-du-Nord -L’Île-du-Havre-Aubert -Cap-aux-Meules	2,686	Les Îles-de-la-Madeleine
Grande-Cascapédia	Municipality		June 2, 1999	Merged with Saint-Jules	261	Cascapédia_{(Now named Cascapédia–Saint-Jules)}
Grande-Entrée	Municipality		January 1, 2002	Merged with: -Fatima -Havre-aux-Maisons -L’Étang-du-Nord -L’Île-du-Havre-Aubert -Cap-aux-Meules	660	Les Îles-de-la-Madeleine
Grande-Grève	Municipality	Cap-des-Rosiers (1870–1944)	January 1, 1971	Annexed	846	Gaspé
Grande-Rivière-Ouest	Municipality	Petite-Rivière-Ouest (1932)	September 21, 1974	Merged with: -Grande-Rivière -Petit-Pabos	1,410	Grande-Rivière
Haldimand	Municipality	Partie-Ouest-du-Canton-de-Douglas (1879–1953)	January 1, 1971	Annexed	706	Gaspé
Havre-Aubert	Municipality	Havre-Aubert-Est (1951-1964)	January 1, 1972	Merged with Bassin	1,133	Île-du-Havre-Aubert_{(Now part of Les Îles-de-la-Madeleine)}
Havre-aux-Maisons	Municipality		January 1, 2002	Merged with: -Fatima -Grande-Entrée -L’Étang-du-Nord -L’Île-du-Havre-Aubert -Cap-aux-Meules	2,057	Les Îles-de-la-Madeleine
L’Anse-aux-Griffons	Municipality		January 1, 1971	Annexed	1,254	Gaspé
L'Étang-du-Nord	Municipality		January 1, 2002	Merged with: -Fatima -Grande-Entrée -Havre-aux-Maison -L’Île-du-Havre-Aubert -Cap-aux-Meules	2,944	Les Îles-de-la-Madeleine
L'Île-d'Entrée	Village		June 14, 2000	Annexed	175	L’Île-du-Havre-Aubert_{(Now part of Les Îles-de-la-Madeleine)}
L’Île-du-Havre-Aubert	Municipality		January 1, 2002	Merged with: -Fatima -Grande-Entrée -Havre-aux-Maison -L’Étang-du-Nord -Cap-aux-Meules	2,275	Les Îles-de-la-Madeleine
Newport	Municipality		June 27, 2001	Merged with: -Chandler -Pabos -Pabos Mills -Saint-François-de-Pabos	2,029	Pabos_{(Now named Chandler)}
Pabos Mills	Municipality		June 27, 2001	Merged with: -Chandler -Newport -Pabos -Saint-François-de-Pabos	1,578	Pabos_{(Now named Chandler)}
Paspébiac-Ouest	Municipality		August 20, 1997	Annexed	709	Paspébiac
Petit-Pabos	Municipality		September 21, 1974	Merged with: -Grande-Rivière -Grande-Rivière-Ouest	682	Grande-Rivière
Port-Daniel	Municipality		January 17, 2001	Merged with Sainte-Germaine-de-l'Anse-aux-Gascons	1,755	Port-Daniel-Gascons
Port-Daniel-Partie-Est	Township		April 18, 1990	Merged with Port-Daniel-Partie-Ouest	900	Port-Daniel_{(Now part of Port-Daniel–Gascons)}
Port-Daniel-Partie-Ouest	Township		April 18, 1990	Merged with Port-Daniel-Partie-Est	1,096	Port-Daniel_{(Now part of Port-Daniel–Gascons)}
Rivière-au-Renard	Municipality	Fox (1855–1933)	January 1, 1971	Annexed	2,888	Gaspé
Saint-Alban-du-Cap-des-Rosiers	Municipality		January 1, 1971	Annexed	842	Gaspé
Saint-François-de-Pabos	Municipality		June 27, 2001	Merged with: -Chandler -Newport -Pabos -Pabos Mills	708	Pabos_{(Now named Chandler)}
Saint-Jules	Municipality		June 2, 1999	Merged with Grande-Cascapédia	412	Cascapédia_{(Now named Cascapédia-Saint-Jules)}
Saint-Majorique	Municipality	Sydenham-Sud (1921–1966)	January 1, 1971	Annexed	1,006	Gaspé
Saint-Maurice	Parish		January 1, 1971	Annexed	2,338	Gaspé
Saint-Norbert-du-Cap-Chat	Parish		October 19, 1968	Merged with Cap-Chat	1,830	Cap-Chat
Saint-Omer	Parish		October 4, 2000	Merged with Carleton	1,381	Carleton-Saint-Omer_{(Now named Carleton-sur-Mer)}
Saint-Pierre-de-la-Malbaie-Numéro-Deux	Municipality		January 1, 1971	Merged with: -Barachois -Bridgeville -Percé -Cap-d’Espoir	1,082	Percé
Sainte-Germaine-de-l'Anse-aux-Gascons	Municipality		January 17, 2001	Merged with Port-Daniel	1,281	Port-Daniel–Gascons
Tourelle	Municipality	Saint-Joachim-de-Tourelle (1923-1984)	February 2, 2000	Merged with Sainte-Anne-des-Monts	1,566	Sainte-Anne-des-Monts-Tourelle_{(Now named Sainte-Anne-des-Monts)}
York	Municipality		January 1, 1971	Annexed	993	Gaspé

== Chaudière-Appalaches ==
Chaudière-Appalaches

Former municipality	Former status	Other former name	Disappearance date	Disappearance reason	Population at time of disappearance	Became part of:
Amiante	Village		January 1, 1929	Annexed	386	Thetford Mines
Aubert-Gallion	Municipality	Saint-Georges (1856–1969)	September 26, 2001	Annexed	2,209	Saint-Georges
Beauceville-Est	Town		March 14, 1973	Annexed	2,192	Beauceville
Beaulac	Village		March 15, 2000	Merged with Garthby	397	Beaulac-Garthby
Bernières	Municipality	Saint-Nicolas-Sud (1912-1968)	September 21, 1994	Merged with Saint-Nicolas	6,831	Bernières-Saint-Nicolas _{(Now part of Lévis)}
Bienville	Village		February 8, 1924	Annexed	1,462	Lauzon_{(Now part of Lévis)}
Black Lake	City	Lac-Noir (1906–1908)	October 17, 2001	Annexed	4,408	Thetford Mines
Buckland	Township		January 1, 1888	Dissolved	541	
Charny	City	Notre-Dame-du-Perpétuel-Secours-de-Charny (1903–1924)	January 1, 2002	Annexed	10,507	Lévis
East Broughton Station	Village		January 5, 1994	Annexed	1,191	East Broughton
Francoeur	Village		April 6, 1974	Merged with Saint-Apollinaire	1,186	Saint-Apollinaire
Garthby	Township		March 15, 2000	Merged with Beaulac	399	Beaulac-Garthby
L’Enfant-Jésus	Parish		March 22, 1989	Merged with Vallée-Jonction	813	Vallée-Jonction
L'Islet-sur-Mer	Municipality		January 1, 2000	Merged with: -L'Islet -Saint-Eugène	1,786	L'Islet-sur-Mer-Saint-Eugène-l'Islet_{(Now named L'Islet)}
Lauzon	City		September 1, 1989	Merged with Lévis	13,620	Lévis-Lauzon_{(Now named Lévis)}
Leeds-Partie-Est	Township	Partie-Est-du-Township-de-Leeds (1882–1969)	October 12, 1974	Annexed	681	Saint-Pierre-de-Broughton
Linière	Village		April 13, 1994	Merged with Saint-Côme-de-Kennebec	1,143	Saint-Côme-de-Linière_{(Now named Saint-Côme-Linière)}
Louis-Joliette	Municipality		October 1, 1977	Merged with Sainte-Claire	548	Sainte-Claire
Nelson	Township		January 19, 1985	Annexed	226	Sainte-Agathe_{(Now part of Sainte-Agathe-de-Lotbinière)}
Notre-Dame-de-Bon-Secours-de-l’Islet	Parish	Islet (1855-1969)	November 29, 1989	Merged with L’Islet-sur-Mer	1,137	L’Islet-sur-Mer_{(Now part of L'Islet)}
Notre-Dame-de-la-Victoire	Parish		February 1, 1917	Annexed	1,251	Lévis
Pintendre	Municipality	Saint-Louis-de-Pintendre (1901–1986)	January 1, 2002	Annexed	6,209	Lévis
Pontbriand	Municipality	Saint-Antoine-de-Pontbriand (1910–1987)	October 17, 2001	Annexed	858	Thetford Mines
Rivière-Blanche	Municipality		December 14, 1994	Annexed	978	Thetford Mines
Rivière-Boyer	Municipality		October 9, 1976	Annexed	867	Saint-Henri
Robertsonville	Village		October 17, 2001	Annexed	1,829	Thetford Mines
Sacré-Coeur-de-Marie-Partie-Sud	Municipality	Sacré-Coeur-de-Marie (1910-1969)	February 14, 2001	Merged with Saint-Méthode-de-Frontenac	668	Adstock
Saint-Agapit-de-Beaurivage	Parish		April 14, 1979	Merged with Saint-Agapitville	1,076	Saint-Agapit
Saint-Agapitville	Village		April 14, 1979	Merged with Saint-Agapit-de-Beaurivage	1,672	Saint-Agapit
Saint-Cajetan-d'Armagh	Parish	Armagh (1861-1890)	December 22, 1993	Merged with Armagh	814	Armagh
Saint-Charles	Village		December 22, 1993	Merged with Saint-Charles-Borromée	979	Saint-Charles-de-Bellechasse
Saint-Charles-Borromée	Parish		December 22, 1993	Merged with Saint-Charles	1,184	Saint-Charles-de-Bellechasse
Saint-Côme-de-Kennebec	Parish		April 13, 1994	Merged with Linière	1,958	Saint-Côme-de-Linière_{(Now named Saint-Côme-Linière)}
Saint-David-de-l’Auberivière	City		August 1, 1990	Annexed	5,769	Lévis-Lauzon_{(Now named Lévis)}
Saint-Elzéar-de-Beauce	Municipality	Saint-Elzéar-de-Linière (1855-1969)	November 30, 1994	Merged with Saint-Elzéar	602	Saint-Elzéar
Saint-Éphrem-de-Tring	Village		December 24, 1997	Merged with Saint-Éphrem-de-Beauce	1,248	Saint-Éphrem-de-Beauce
Saint-Étienne-de-Lauzon	Municipality	Saint-Étienne (1957–1984)	January 1, 2002	Annexed	8,897	Lévis
Saint-Eugène	Parish	Saint-Eugène-de-l'Islet (1869-1969)	January 1, 2000	Merged with: -L'Islet -L'Islet-sur-Mer	1,158	L'Islet-sur-Mer-Saint-Eugène-l'Islet_{(Now named L'Islet)}
Saint-Évariste-de-Forsyth	Municipality	Forsyth (1855-1870)	January 1, 2024	Merged with Courcelles	511	Courcelles-Saint-Évariste
Saint-François-de-Beauce	Municipality	Saint-François (1855–1957)	February 25, 1998	Annexed	1,357	Beauceville
Saint-François-Ouest	Municipality		February 25, 1998	Annexed	1,263	Beauceville
Saint-Gédéon	Parish	Marlow (1900–1911)	February 12, 2003	Annexed	553	Saint-Gédéon-de-Beauce
Saint-Georges-Est	Parish		September 26, 2001	Annexed	3,555	Saint-Georges
Saint-Georges-Ouest	City		May 23, 1990	Annexed	6,352	Saint-Georges
Saint-Henri-de-Lauzon	Parish	Saint-Henri (1855-1969)	November 1, 1975	Merged with Saint-Henri	1,225	Saint-Henri
Saint-Honoré	Parish		April 19, 2000	Merged with Shenley	691	Saint-Honoré-de-Shenley
Saint-Jean-Chrysostome	City		January 1, 2002	Annexed	17,089	Lévis
Saint-Joseph-de-la-Pointe-de-Lévy	Parish	Pointe-Lévi (1855–1969)	January 1, 2002	Annexed	913	Lévis
Saint-Louis-de-Lotbinière	Parish	Lotbinière (1855-1969)	January 1, 1979	Merged with Lotbinière	699	Lotbinière
Saint-Méthode-de-Frontenac	Municipality	Adstock (1888-1894), Saint-Méthode-d'Adstock (1894-1945)	February 14, 2001	Merged with Sacré-Coeur-de-Marie-Partie-Sud	1,613	Adstock
Saint-Nicolas	City		September 21, 1994	Merged with Bernières	7,600	Bernières-Saint-Nicolas_{(Now part of Lévis)}
Saint-Nicolas	City	Bernières-Saint-Nicolas (1994–1996)	January 1, 2002	Annexed	16,645	Lévis
Saint-Rédempteur	City		January 1, 2002	Annexed	6,349	Lévis
Saint-Romuald	City	Saint-Romuald-d’Etchemin (1855–1982)	January 1, 2002	Annexed	10,825	Lévis
Saint-Telesphore	Parish		December 18, 1965	Merged with Saint-Romuald-d’Etchemin	385	Saint-Romuald-d’Etchemin_{(Now part of Lévis)}
Saint-Théophile-de-Beauce	Parish		June 28, 1975	Merged with Saint-Théophile	659	Saint-Théophile
Saint-Thomas	Parish		April 2, 1966	Merged with Montmagny	4,565	Montmagny
Saint-Victor-de-Tring	Municipality		December 31, 1996	Merged with Saint-Victor	1,183	Saint-Victor
Sainte-Agathe	Parish		February 3, 1999	Merged with Sainte-Agathe	561	Sainte-Agathe-de-Lotbinière
Sainte-Agathe	Village		February 3, 1999	Merged with Sainte-Agathe	675	Sainte-Agathe-de-Lotbinière
Sainte-Anne-du-Lac	Village		October 24, 2001	Annexed	63	Adstock
Sainte-Emmélie	Parish	Sainte-Emmélie-de-Lotbinière (1863-1969)	January 26, 2000	Merged with Leclercville	322	Leclercville
Sainte-Germaine-du-Lac-Etchemin	Parish		October 10, 2001	Merged with Lac-Etchemin	1,565	Lac-Etchemin
Sainte-Hélène-de-Breakeyville	Parish		January 1, 2002	Annexed	3,639	Lévis
Shenley	Township		April 19, 2000	Merged with Saint-Honoré	1,009	Saint-Honoré-de-Shenley
Taschereau-Fortier	Municipality		March 29, 1995	Merged with Scott	903	Scott
Thetford-Partie-Sud	Township	Sud-du-Canton-de-Thetford (1885–1969)	October 17, 2001	Annexed	3,030	Thetford Mines

== Laval ==
Laval

Former municipality	Former status	Other former name	Disappearance date	Disappearance reason	Population at time of disappearance	Became part of:
Auteuil	Town	Sainte-Rose-de-Lima (1855-1950), Sainte-Rose-Est (1950-1961)	August 6, 1965	Merged with: -Chomedey -Duvernay -Laval-des-Rapides -Laval-Ouest -Pont-Viau -Sainte-Rose -Fabreville -Laval-sur-le-Lac -Saint-François -Saint-Vincent-de-Paul -Sainte-Dorothée -Ville-des-Îles-Laval -Vimont	2,603	Laval
Chomedey	City		August 6, 1965	Merged with: -Duvernay -Laval-des-Rapides -Laval-Ouest -Pont-Viau -Sainte-Rose -Auteuil -Fabreville -Laval-sur-le-Lac -Saint-François -Saint-Vincent-de-Paul -Sainte-Dorothée -Ville-des-Îles-Laval -Vimont	30,445	Laval
Duvernay	City	Saint-Vincent-de-Paul (1855-1957)	August 6, 1965	Merged with: -Chomedey -Laval-des-Rapides -Laval-Ouest -Pont-Viau -Sainte-Rose -Auteuil -Fabreville -Laval-sur-le-Lac -Saint-François -Saint-Vincent-de-Paul -Sainte-Dorothée -Ville-des-Îles-Laval -Vimont	10,939	Laval
Fabreville	Town	Sainte-Rose (1914-1957)	August 6, 1965	Merged with: -Chomedey -Duvernay -Laval-des-Rapides -Laval-Ouest -Pont-Viau -Sainte-Rose -Auteuil -Laval-sur-le-Lac -Saint-François -Saint-Vincent-de-Paul -Sainte-Dorothée -Ville-des-Îles-Laval -Vimont	5,213	Laval
L'Abord-à-Plouffe	Town		April 1, 1961	Merged with: -Saint-Martin -Renaud	8,099	Chomedey_{(Now part of Laval)}
Laval-des-Rapides	City		August 6, 1965	Merged with: -Chomedey -Duvernay -Laval-Ouest -Pont-Viau -Sainte-Rose -Auteuil -Fabreville -Laval-sur-le-Lac -Saint-François -Saint-Vincent-de-Paul -Sainte-Dorothée -Ville-des-Îles-Laval -Vimont	19,227	Laval
Laval-Ouest	City	Plage-Laval (1930-1951)	August 6, 1965	Merged with: -Chomedey -Duvernay -Laval-des-Rapides -Pont-Viau -Sainte-Rose -Auteuil -Fabreville -Laval-sur-le-Lac -Saint-François -Saint-Vincent-de-Paul -Sainte-Dorothée -Ville-des-Îles-Laval -Vimont	5,440	Laval
Laval-sur-le-Lac	Town		August 6, 1965	Merged with: -Chomedey -Duvernay -Laval-des-Rapides -Laval-Ouest -Pont-Viau -Sainte-Rose -Auteuil -Fabreville -Saint-François -Saint-Vincent-de-Paul -Sainte-Dorothée -Ville-des-Îles-Laval -Vimont	620	Laval
Pont-Viau	City		August 6, 1965	Merged with: -Chomedey -Duvernay -Laval-des-Rapides -Laval-Ouest -Sainte-Rose -Auteuil -Fabreville -Laval-sur-le-Lac -Saint-François -Saint-Vincent-de-Paul -Sainte-Dorothée -Ville-des-Îles-Laval -Vimont	16,077	Laval
Renaud	Town	Saint-Martin (1855-1959)	April 1, 1961	Merged with: -Saint-Martin -L'Abord-à-Plouffe	2,138	Chomedey_{(Now part of Laval)}
Saint-François	Town	Saint-François-de-Sales-Isle-Jésus (1855-1958)	August 6, 1965	Merged with: -Chomedey -Duvernay -Laval-des-Rapides -Laval-Ouest -Pont-Viau -Sainte-Rose -Auteuil -Fabreville -Laval-sur-le-Lac -Saint-Vincent-de-Paul -Sainte-Dorothée -Ville-des-Îles-Laval -Vimont	5,122	Laval
Saint-Martin	City		April 1, 1961	Merged with: -L'Abord-à-Plouffe -Renaud	6,440	Chomedey_{(Now part of Laval)}
Saint-Vincent-de-Paul	Town		August 6, 1965	Merged with: -Chomedey -Duvernay -Laval-des-Rapides -Laval-Ouest -Pont-Viau -Sainte-Rose -Auteuil -Fabreville -Laval-sur-le-Lac -Saint-François -Sainte-Dorothée -Ville-des-Îles-Laval -Vimont	11,214	Laval
Sainte-Dorothée	Town		August 6, 1965	Merged with: -Chomedey -Duvernay -Laval-des-Rapides -Laval-Ouest -Pont-Viau -Sainte-Rose -Auteuil -Fabreville -Laval-sur-le-Lac -Saint-François -Saint-Vincent-de-Paul -Ville-des-Îles-Laval -Vimont	5,297	Laval
Sainte-Rose	City		August 6, 1965	Merged with: -Chomedey -Duvernay -Laval-des-Rapides -Laval-Ouest -Pont-Viau -Auteuil -Fabreville -Laval-sur-le-Lac -Saint-François -Saint-Vincent-de-Paul -Sainte-Dorothée -Ville-des-Îles-Laval -Vimont	7,571	Laval
Ville-des-Îles-Laval	Town		August 6, 1965	Merged with: -Chomedey -Duvernay -Laval-des-Rapides -Laval-Ouest -Pont-Viau -Sainte-Rose -Auteuil -Fabreville -Laval-sur-le-Lac -Saint-François -Saint-Vincent-de-Paul -Sainte-Dorothée -Vimont	823	Laval
Vimont	Town	Saint-Elzéar-de-Laval (1904-1956), Saint-Elzéar (1956-1962)	August 6, 1965	Merged with: -Chomedey -Duvernay -Laval-des-Rapides -Laval-Ouest -Pont-Viau -Sainte-Rose -Auteuil -Fabreville -Laval-sur-le-Lac -Saint-François -Saint-Vincent-de-Paul -Sainte-Dorothée -Ville-des-Îles-Laval	4,150	Laval

== Lanaudière ==
Lanaudière

Former municipality	Former status	Other former name	Disappearance date	Disappearance reason	Population at time of disappearance	Became part of:
Joliette-Sud	Municipality	Saint-Charles-Borromée-Sud (1957)	November 12, 1966	Annexed	974	Joliette
La Plaine	City	Saint-Joachim (1922–1969)	June 27, 2001	Annexed	14,413	Terrebonne
Lac-Paré	Parish		November 13, 1991	Merged with Chertsey	193	Chertsey
Lachenaie	City	Saint-Charles-de-Lachenaie (1861–1972)	June 27, 2001	Annexed	18,489	Terrebonne
Lanoraie-d'Autray	Municipality		December 6, 2000	Merged with Saint-Joseph-de-Lanoraie	1,904	Lanoraie
Laurentides	City	Saint-Lin (1857-1883)	March 1, 2000	Merged with Saint-Lin	2,703	Saint-Lin-Laurentides
Le Gardeur	City	Saint-Paul-l’Ermite (1857–1978)	June 1, 2002	Annexed	17,668	Repentigny
Masson-et-Laviolette	Municipality		March 3, 1979	Merged with Saint-Michel-des-Saints	97	Saint-Michel-des-Saints
Sacré-Coeur-de-Crabtree	Municipality	Sacré-Coeur-de-Jésus (1921–1991)	October 23, 1996	Annexed	1,143	Crabtree
Saint-Antoine-de-Lavaltrie	Parish		May 16, 2001	Merged with Lavaltrie	4,385	Lavaltrie
Saint-Gérard-Majella	Parish		July 1, 2000	Annexed	4,207	L'Assomption
Saint-Joseph-de-Lanoraie	Parish		December 6, 2000	Merged with Lanoraie-d'Autray	1,855	Lanoraie
Saint-Lin	Municipality	Saint-Lin-de-Lachenaye (1855-1969)	March 1, 2000	Merged with Laurentides	9,336	Saint-Lin-Laurentides
Saint-Louis-de-Terrebonne	Parish	Terrebonne (1855–1969)	June 8, 1985	Annexed	14,172	Terrebonne
Saint-Viateur	Parish		January 7, 1998	Merged with Saint-Cuthbert	201	Saint-Cuthbert

== Laurentides ==
Laurentides

Former municipality	Former status	Other former name	Disappearance date	Disappearance reason	Population at time of disappearance	Became part of:
Ayersville	Village		April 30, 1966	Merged with Lachute	2,957	Lachute
Beaux-Rivages	Municipality	Est-du-Canton-de-Campbell (1912-1953), Lac-des-Écorces (1953-1984)	October 10, 2002	Merged with: -Lac-des-Écorces -Val-Barrette	1,192	Beaux-Rivages-Lac-des-Écorces-Val-Barrette_{(Now named Lac-des-Écorces)}
Bel-Air	Village		January 1, 1913	Annexed		Saint-Eustache
Bellefeuille	City	Saint-Jérôme (1855–1966)	January 1, 2002	Annexed	14,066	Saint-Jérôme
Bellerive-sur-le-Lac	Municipality	Loranger (1920-1921), Lacaille (1921-1931), Bellerive (1931-1962)	October 30, 1971	Merged with: -Nominingue -Loranger	118	Lac-Nominingue_{(Now named Nominingue)}
Brownsburg	Village		October 6, 1999	Merged with Chatham	2,583	Brownsburg-Chatham
Brunet	Municipality	Campbell (1900–1953)	May 29, 1971	Annexed	1,520	Mont-Laurier
Calumet	Village		April 24, 2002	Merged with Grenville	554	Grenville-sur-la-Rouge
Carillon	Village		December 29, 1999	Merged with: -Saint-André-Est -Saint-André-d'Argenteuil	258	Saint-André-Carillon_{(Now named Saint-André-d'Argenteuil)}
Chatham	Township		October 6, 1999	Merged with Brownsburg	4,100	Brownsburg-Chatham
Décarie	Township		December 30, 1976	Merged with Sainte-Anne-du-Lac	416	Sainte-Anne-du-Lac
Des Ruisseaux	Municipality	Robertson-et-Pope (1898–1975)	January 8, 2003	Annexed	5,401	Mont-Laurier
Grenville (Note: Not to be confused with the current municipality of Grenville)	Township	2,109	April 24, 2002	Merged with Calumet		Grenville-sur-la-Rouge
Joly	Township		January 27, 1973	Merged with Labelle	442	Labelle
L’Annonciation	Village		December 18, 2002	Merged with: -Marchand -Sainte-Véronique	1,984	Rivière-Rouge
Lac-Carré	Village	Saint-Faustin-Station (1922-1947)	January 3, 1996	Merged with Saint-Faustin	801	Saint-Faustin-Lac-Carré_{(Now named Mont-Blanc)}
Lafontaine	City		January 1, 2002	Annexed	9,477	Saint-Jérôme
Lesage	Municipality		January 20, 1973	Merged with: -Prévost -Shawbridge	1,190	Shawbridge_{(Now named Prévost)}
Loranger	Township		October 30, 1971	Merged with: -Bellerive-sur-le-Lac -Nominingue	332	Lac-Nominingue_{(Now named Nominingue)}
Marchand	Municipality		December 18, 2002	Merged with: -L’Annonciation -Sainte-Véronique	1,420	Rivière-Rouge
Mont-Gabriel	City		November 21, 1981	Merged with Mont-Rolland	25	Mont-Rolland_{(Now part of Sainte-Adèle)}
Mont-Rolland	Village		August 27, 1997	Annexed	2,882	Sainte-Adèle
New Glasgow	Village		May 3, 2000	Annexed	157	Sainte-Sophie
Oka-sur-le-Lac	City		August 12, 1982	Annexed	0	Oka
Rapide-de-l’Original	Village		May 25, 1915	Annexed		Mont-Laurier
Saint-André-Est	Village		December 29, 1999	Merged with: -Carillon -Saint-André-d'Argenteuil	1,471	Saint-André-Carillon_{(Now named Saint-André-d'Argenteuil)}
Saint-Antoine	City	Saint-Antoine-des-Laurentides (1949–1967)	January 1, 2002	Annexed	11,488	Saint-Jérôme
Saint-Antoine-des-Laurentides	Parish	Saint-Jérôme (1855-1966)	January 1, 1971	Merged with: -Saint-Janvier-de-Lacroix -Saint-Augustin -Saint-Benoît -Sainte-Scholastique -Saint-Augustin -Saint-Canut -Saint-Hermas -Saint-Janvier-de-Blainville -Sainte-Monique -Sainte-Scholastique	934	Sainte-Scholastique_{(Now named Mirabel)}
Saint-Augustin	Village		January 1, 1971	Merged with: -Saint-Janvier-de-Lacroix -Saint-Benoît -Sainte-Scholastique -Saint-Antoine-des-Laurentides -Saint-Augustin -Saint-Canut -Saint-Hermas -Saint-Janvier-de-Blainville -Sainte-Monique -Sainte-Scholastique	478	Sainte-Scholastique_{(Now named Mirabel)}
Saint-Augustin	Parish		January 1, 1971	Merged with: -Saint-Janvier-de-Lacroix -Saint-Augustin -Saint-Benoît -Sainte-Scholastique -Saint-Antoine-des-Laurentides -Saint-Canut -Saint-Hermas -Saint-Janvier-de-Blainville -Sainte-Monique -Sainte-Scholastique	1,325	Sainte-Scholastique_{(Now named Mirabel)}
Saint-Benoît	Village		January 1, 1971	Merged with: -Saint-Janvier-de-Lacroix -Saint-Augustin -Sainte-Scholastique -Saint-Antoine-des-Laurentides -Saint-Augustin -Saint-Canut -Saint-Hermas -Saint-Janvier-de-Blainville -Sainte-Monique -Sainte-Scholastique	550	Sainte-Scholastique_{(Now named Mirabel)}
Saint-Canut	Parish		January 1, 1971	Merged with: -Saint-Janvier-de-Lacroix -Saint-Augustin -Saint-Benoît -Sainte-Scholastique -Saint-Antoine-des-Laurentides -Saint-Augustin -Saint-Hermas -Saint-Janvier-de-Blainville -Sainte-Monique -Sainte-Scholastique	1,248	Sainte-Scholastique_{(Now named Mirabel)}
Saint-Faustin	Municipality	Saint-Faustin-Sud (1957-1960)	January 3, 1996	Merged with Lac-Carré	1,410	Saint-Faustin-Lac-Carré_{(Now named Mont-Blanc)}
Saint-Hermas	Parish		January 1, 1971	Merged with: -Saint-Janvier-de-Lacroix -Saint-Augustin -Saint-Benoît -Sainte-Scholastique -Saint-Antoine-des-Laurentides -Saint-Augustin -Saint-Canut -Saint-Janvier-de-Blainville -Sainte-Monique -Sainte-Scholastique	1,060	Sainte-Scholastique_{(Now named Mirabel)}
Saint-Janvier-de-Blainville	Parish		January 1, 1971	Merged with: -Saint-Janvier-de-Lacroix -Saint-Augustin -Saint-Benoît -Sainte-Scholastique -Saint-Antoine-des-Laurentides -Saint-Augustin -Saint-Canut -Saint-Hermas -Sainte-Monique -Sainte-Scholastique	2,477	Sainte-Scholastique_{(Now named Mirabel)}
Saint-Janvier-de-Lacroix	Municipality		January 1, 1971	Merged with: -Saint-Augustin -Saint-Benoît -Sainte-Scholastique -Saint-Antoine-des-Laurentides -Saint-Augustin -Saint-Canut -Saint-Hermas -Saint-Janvier-de-Blainville -Sainte-Monique -Sainte-Scholastique	1,198	Sainte-Scholastique_{(Now named Mirabel)}
Saint-Jérusalem-d’Argenteuil	Parish		January 1, 1971	Dissolved	2,546	Lachute and Sainte-Scholastique_{(Now named Mirabel)}
Saint-Jovite	City		November 22, 2000	Merged with: -Mont-Tremblant -Saint-Jovite	4,609	Mont-Tremblant
Saint-Jovite	Parish	DeSalaberry-et-Grandison (1881-1960)	November 22, 2000	Merged with: -Saint-Jovite -Mont-Tremblant	1,708	Mont-Tremblant
Saint-Sauveur-des-Monts	Village		September 11, 2002	Merged with Saint-Sauveur	3,316	Saint-Sauveur
Sainte-Agathe-Nord	Municipality	Sainte-Agathe (1863–1991)	February 27, 2002	Annexed	1,571	Sainte-Agathe-des-Monts
Sainte-Agathe-Sud	Village		January 1, 1999	Annexed	2,209	Sainte-Agathe-des-Monts
Sainte-Monique	Parish		January 1, 1971	Merged with: -Saint-Janvier-de-Lacroix -Saint-Augustin -Saint-Benoît -Sainte-Scholastique -Saint-Antoine-des-Laurentides -Saint-Augustin -Saint-Canut -Saint-Hermas -Saint-Janvier-de-Blainville -Sainte-Scholastique	1,223	Sainte-Scholastique_{(Now named Mirabel)}
Sainte-Véronique	Village	Turgeon (1904-1984)	December 18, 2002	Merged with: -Marchand -L’Annonciation	1,050	Rivière-Rouge
Val-Barrette	Village		October 10, 2002	Merged with: -Beaux-Rivages -Lac-des-Écorces	612	Beaux-Rivages-Lac-des-Écorces-Val-Barrette_{(Now named Lac-des-Écorces)}

== Montérégie ==
Montérégie

Former municipality	Former status	Other former name	Disappearance date	Disappearance reason	Population at time of disappearance	Became part of:
Châteauguay-Centre	Town	Saint-Joachim-de-Châteauguay (1855–1960)	November 3, 1975	Annexed	17,942	Châteauguay
Châteauguay Heights	Town		September 7, 1968	Annexed	1,238	Châteauguay
Como-Est	Village		June 7, 1969	Merged with: -Hudson -Hudson Heights	1,025	Hudson
Coteau-Landing	Village		May 18, 1994	Merged with Coteau-Station	1,552	Coteaux_{(Now named Les Coteaux)}
Coteau-Station	Village		May 18, 1994	Merged with Coteau-Landing	1,061	Coteaux_{(Now named Les Coteaux)}
Dorion	City		March 16, 1994	Merged with Vaudreuil	5,920	Vaudreuil-Dorion
Douville	Town		January 1, 1976	Annexed	3,267	Saint-Hyacinthe
Fort-Chambly	Town	Chambly (1848-1952)	September 18, 1965	Merged with Chambly	1,987	Chambly
Grande-Île	Municipality		April 24, 2002	Annexed	4,559	Salaberry-de-Valleyfield
Greenfield Park	City		January 1, 2002	Annexed	16,978	Longueuil
Hudson Heights	Village	Como (1877-1921), Hudson (1921-1926)	June 7, 1969	Merged with: -Como-Est -Hudson	1,543	Hudson
Iberville	City	Christieville (1846-1859)	January 24, 2001	Merged with: -Saint-Jean-sur-Richelieu -Saint-Luc -L'Acadie -Saint-Athanase	9,635	Saint-Jean-Iberville_{(Now named Saint-Jean-sur-Richelieu)}
Jacques-Cartier	City		August 16, 1969	Annexed	52,527	Longueuil
L'Acadie	Municipality	Sainte-Marguerite-de-Blairfindie (1870-1956)	January 24, 2001	Merged with: -Iberville -Saint-Jean-sur-Richelieu -Saint-Luc -Saint-Athanase	5,474	Saint-Jean-Iberville_{(Now named Saint-Jean-sur-Richelieu)}
L'Ange-Gardien	Village	Canrobert (1870-1956)	December 31, 1997	Merged with Saint-Ange-Gardien	599	Ange-Gardien
La Providence	Town		January 1, 1976	Annexed	4,709	Saint-Hyacinthe
Laflèche	City	Mackayville (1947–1959)	October 30, 1971	Annexed	13,433	Saint-Hubert_{(Now part of Longueuil)}
LeMoyne	City		January 1, 2002	Annexed	4,855	Longueuil
Maple Grove	City		January 1, 2002	Annexed	2,628	Beauharnois
Melocheville	Village	Lac-Saint-Louis (1919–1953)	January 1, 2002	Annexed	2,449	Beauharnois
Milton	Township		January 1, 1864	Dissolved	2,790	Saint-Valérien-de-Milton and Sainte-Cécile-de-Milton
Montréal-Sud	Town		January 28, 1961	Annexed	5,319	Longueuil
Notre-Dame	Municipality	Laprairie (1855–1952)	March 25, 1978	Annexed	2,729	Brossard
Notre-Dame-de-Bon-Secours	Municipality		March 15, 2000	Annexed	1,516	Richelieu
Notre-Dame-de-Saint-Hyacinthe	Parish	Saint-Hyacinthe (1855–1969)	December 27, 2001	Annexed	866	Saint-Hyacinthe
Notre-Dame-du-Mont-Carmel	Parish		September 13, 2001	Merged with Lacolle	940	Lacolle
Nouveau-Salaberry	Municipality		October 21, 1944	Annexed	1,043	Salaberry-de-Valleyfield
Pointe-du-Moulin	Town		April 14, 1984	Annexed	249	Notre-Dame-de-l'Île-Perrot
Préville	Town		May 3, 1969	Annexed	1,299	Saint-Lambert
Saint-André-d'Acton	Parish		January 26, 2000	Annexed	2,487	Acton Vale
Saint-Ange-Gardien	Parish		December 31, 1997	Merged with L'Ange-Gardien	1,312	Ange-Gardien
Saint-Antoine-Abbé-Partie-Nord-Est	Parish	Saint-Antoine-Abbé (1860-1969)	March 3, 1973	Merged with Franklin	313	Franklin
Saint-Antoine-de-Padoue	Parish	Saint-Antoine (1855–1890)	November 6, 1982	Annexed	585	Saint-Antoine-sur-Richelieu
Saint-Athanase	Parish		January 24, 2001	Merged with: -Iberville -Saint-Jean-sur-Richelieu -Saint-Luc -L'Acadie	6,546	Saint-Jean-Iberville_{(Now named Saint-Jean-sur-Richelieu)}
Saint-Charles	Parish		March 22, 1995	Merged with Saint-Charles-sur-Richelieu	1,231	Saint-Charles-sur-Richelieu
Saint-Clément	Parish		February 21, 1957	Annexed	765	Beauharnois
Saint-Denis	Parish		December 24, 1997	Merged with Saint-Denis	1,147	Saint-Denis-sur-Richelieu
Saint-Denis	Village		December 24, 1997	Merged with Saint-Denis	994	Saint-Denis-sur-Richelieu
Saint-Éphrem-d'Upton	Parish		February 25, 1998	Merged with Upton	858	Upton
Saint-François-Xavier-de-Verchères	Parish	Verchères (1855-1969)	September 18, 1971	Merged with Verchères	1,110	Verchères
Saint-Grégoire-le-Grand	Parish		December 21, 1994	Merged with Mont-Saint-Grégoire	2,138	Mont-Saint-Grégoire
Saint-Hilaire-sur-Richelieu	Town	Saint-Hilaire (1912-1963)	March 12, 1966	Merged with Mont-Saint-Hilaire	2,911	Mont-Saint-Hilaire
Saint-Hubert	City		January 1, 2002	Annexed	75,912	Longueuil
Saint-Hyacinthe-le-Confesseur	Parish		December 27, 2001	Annexed	1,126	Saint-Hyacinthe
Saint-Ignace-du-Coteau-du-Lac	Parish		February 6, 1982	Merged with Coteau-du-Lac	1,934	Coteau-du-Lac
Saint-Jean-Chrysostome	Parish	Russeltown (1855-1858)	September 29, 1999	Merged with Saint-Chrysostome	1,737	Saint-Chrysostome
Saint-Jean-l’Évangéliste	Parish		April 25, 1970	Annexed	2,801	Saint-Jean_{(Now part of Saint-Jean-sur-Richelieu)}
Saint-Joseph	Town		January 1, 1976	Annexed	4,945	Saint-Hyacinthe
Saint-Joseph-de-Soulanges	Parish		March 9, 1985	Merged with Les Cèdres	2,349	Les Cèdres
Saint-Luc	City		January 24, 2001	Merged with: -Iberville -Saint-Jean-sur-Richelieu -L'Acadie -Saint-Athanase	18,371	Saint-Jean-Iberville_{(Now named Saint-Jean-sur-Richelieu)}
Saint-Malachie-d'Ormstown	Parish	Ormstown (1855-1958)	January 26, 2000	Merged with Ormstown	2,096	Ormstown
Saint-Michel-d'Yamaska	Parish		December 19, 2001	Merged with: -Yamaska -Yamaska-Est	1,017	Yamaska
Saint-Michel-de-Rougemont	Parish		January 26, 2000	Merged with Rougemont	1,463	Rougemont
Saint-Michel-de-Vaudreuil	Village		July 10, 1963	Merged with Vaudreuil	897	Vaudreuil_{(Now part of Vaudreuil-Dorion)}
Saint-Paul-de-Châteauguay	Municipality		September 8, 1999	Annexed	1,362	Sainte-Martine
Saint-Pierre-de-Sorel	Parish	Sorel (1861–1870)	January 29, 1992	Annexed	5,467	Sorel_{(Now part of Sorel-Tracy)}
Saint-Thomas-d'Aquin	Parish		December 27, 2001	Annexed	4,196	Saint-Hyacinthe
Saint-Timothée	City		April 24, 2002	Annexed	8,299	Salaberry-de-Valleyfield
Sainte-Anne-de-Varennes	Parish	Varennes (1855-1969)	August 26, 1972	Merged with Varennes	2,882	Varennes
Sainte-Cécile	Parish		July 22, 1967	Annexed	869	Salaberry-de-Valleyfield
Sainte-Cécile	Village		July 25, 1931	Annexed	457	Salaberry-de-Valleyfield
Sainte-Hélène	Parish		July 9, 1977	Merged with Sainte-Hélène-de-Bagot	806	Sainte-Hélène-de-Bagot
Sainte-Madeleine-de-Rigaud	Parish		November 29, 1995	Merged with Rigaud	3,267	Rigaud
Sainte-Marie-de-Monnoir	Parish		June 14, 2000	Annexed	2,126	Marieville
Sainte-Rosalie	City		December 27, 2001	Annexed	4,153	Saint-Hyacinthe
Sainte-Rosalie	Parish		December 27, 2001	Annexed	1,571	Saint-Hyacinthe
Sorel	City	William-Henry (1848-1860)	March 15, 2000	Merged with Tracy	23,248	Sorel-Tracy
Tracy	City	Saint-Joseph (1875-1954)	March 15, 2000	Merged with Sorel	12,773	Sorel-Tracy
Vaudreuil	City		March 16, 1994	Merged with Dorion	11,187	Vaudreuil-Dorion
Yamaska-Est	Village		December 19, 2001	Merged with: -Yamaska -Saint-Michel-d'Yamaska	250	Yamaska

== Centre-du-Québec ==
Centre-du-Québec

Former municipality	Former status	Other former name	Disappearance date	Disappearance reason	Population at time of disappearance	Became part of:
Arthabaska	City		June 23, 1993	Merged with: -Victoriaville -Sainte-Victoire-d'Arthabaska	7,584	Victoriaville-Arthabaska_{(Now named Victoriaville)}
Baieville	Village		March 26, 1983	Merged with: -Saint-Antoine-de-la-Baie-du-Febvre -Saint-Joseph-de-la-Baie-du-Febvre	390	Baie-du-Febvre
Bécancourt	Village		October 17, 1965	Merged with: -Gentilly -La Rochelle -Laval -Villers -Bécancour -Saint-Edouard-de-Gentilly -Saint-Grégoire-le-Grand -Sainte-Angèle-de-Laval -Sainte-Gertrude -Très-Précieux-Sang-de-Notre-Seigneur	320	Bécancour
Bernierville	Village		November 29, 2000	Annexed	1,871	Saint-Ferdinand
Chénier	Municipality		December 12, 1981	Merged with Tingwick	1,085	Tingwick
Chester-Nord	Municipality		November 30, 1994	Merged with Saint-Norbert-d'Arthabaska	239	Saint-Norbert-d'Arthabaska
Chester-Ouest	Township		December 18, 1982	Merged with Chesterville	528	Chesterville
Deschaillons	Village		May 23, 1990	Merged with Deschaillons-sur-Saint-Laurent	304	Deschaillons-sur-Saint-Laurent
Drummondville-Ouest	Village	Saint-Félix (1941–1943)	November 12, 1966	Annexed	2,057	Drummondville
Drummondville-Sud	City	Saint-Simon-de-Drummond (1937–1959)	December 26, 1981	Annexed	9,420	Drummondville
Gentilly	Village		October 17, 1965	Merged with: -Bécancourt -La Rochelle -Laval -Villers -Bécancour -Saint-Edouard-de-Gentilly -Saint-Grégoire-le-Grand -Sainte-Angèle-de-Laval -Sainte-Gertrude -Très-Précieux-Sang-de-Notre-Seigneur	677	Bécancour
Grantham	Municipality	Grantham-Ouest (1936–1991)	December 22, 1993	Annexed	7,709	Drummondville
Halifax-Nord	Township		December 17, 1997	Merged with Sainte-Sophie	345	Sainte-Sophie-d'Halifax
Horton	Township		March 1, 1858	Annexed	85	Bulstrode_{(Now named Saint-Valère)}
La Rochelle	Village		October 17, 1965	Merged with: -Bécancourt -Gentilly -Laval -Villers -Bécancour -Saint-Edouard-de-Gentilly -Saint-Grégoire-le-Grand -Sainte-Angèle-de-Laval -Sainte-Gertrude -Très-Précieux-Sang-de-Notre-Seigneur	673	Bécancour
Laval	Village		October 17, 1965	Merged with: -Bécancourt -Gentilly -La Rochelle -Villers -Bécancour -Saint-Edouard-de-Gentilly -Saint-Grégoire-le-Grand -Sainte-Angèle-de-Laval -Sainte-Gertrude -Très-Précieux-Sang-de-Notre-Seigneur	484	Bécancour
Les Becquets	Village		February 22, 1986	Merged with Saint-Pierre-les-Becquets	525	Saint-Pierre-les-Becquets
Nicolet-Sud	Municipality		December 27, 2000	Annexed	367	Nicolet
Norbertville	Village		October 21, 2009	Annexed	266	Saint-Norbert-d'Arthabaska
Notre-Dame-de-Pierreville	Parish		June 13, 2001	Merged with: -Pierreville -Saint-Thomas-de-Pierreville	813	Pierreville
Pontgravé	Village		January 1, 1908	Annexed		Chénier_{(Now part of Tingwick)}
Saint-Antoine-de-la-Baie-du-Febvre	Parish		March 26, 1983	Merged with: -Baieville -Saint-Joseph-de-la-Baie-du-Febvre	640	Baie-du-Febvre
Saint-Charles-de-Drummond	Municipality	Wendover-et-Simpson (1864–1988)	July 7, 2004	Annexed	5,798	Drummondville
Saint-Edouard-de-Gentilly	Parish		October 17, 1965	Merged with: -Bécancourt -Gentilly -La Rochelle -Laval -Villers -Bécancour -Saint-Grégoire-le-Grand -Sainte-Angèle-de-Laval -Sainte-Gertrude -Très-Précieux-Sang-de-Notre-Seigneur	1,428	Bécancour
Saint-Grégoire-le-Grand	Parish		October 17, 1965	Merged with: -Bécancourt -Gentilly -La Rochelle -Laval -Villers -Bécancour -Saint-Edouard-de-Gentilly -Sainte-Angèle-de-Laval -Sainte-Gertrude -Très-Précieux-Sang-de-Notre-Seigneur	1,187	Bécancour
Saint-Jacques-de-Horton	Municipality		March 26, 1997	Merged with: -Sainte-Clotilde-de-Horton -Sainte-Clothilde-de-Horton	225	Sainte-Clotilde-de-Horton
Saint-Jean-Baptiste	Municipality	Grantham (1864–1942)	June 25, 1955	Annexed	4,805	Drummondville
Saint-Jean-Baptiste-de-Nicolet	Parish		December 27, 2000	Annexed	3,076	Nicolet
Saint-Jean-Deschaillons	Parish		July 13, 1901	Annexed	2,300	Deschaillons_{(Now part of Deschaillons-sur-Saint-Laurent)}
Saint-Joseph-de-Blandford	Parish		December 31, 1997	Merged with Manseau	446	Manseau
Saint-Joseph-de-Grantham	Town		February 12, 1955	Annexed	6,576	Drummondville
Saint-Joseph-de-la-Baie-du-Febvre	Parish		March 26, 1983	Merged with: -Baieville -Saint-Antoine-de-la-Baie-du-Febvre	359	Baie-du-Febvre
Saint-Léonard	Parish		April 13, 1994	Merged with Saint-Léonard-d'Aston	1,223	Saint-Léonard-d'Aston
Saint-Nicéphore	City	Wickham (1867–1944)	July 7, 2004	Annexed	9,966	Drummondville
Saint-Raphaël-Partie-Sud	Parish	Saint-Raphaël (1916-1969)	March 26, 1997	Merged with Aston-Jonction	219	Aston-Jonction
Saint-Thomas-de-Pierreville	Parish		June 13, 2001	Merged with: -Pierreville -Notre-Dame-de-Pierreville	705	Pierreville
Sainte-Anastasie-de-Nelson	Parish		September 18, 1976	Merged with Lyster	1,178	Lyster
Sainte-Angèle-de-Laval	Parish		October 17, 1965	Merged with: -Bécancourt -Gentilly -La Rochelle -Laval -Villers -Bécancour -Saint-Edouard-de-Gentilly -Saint-Grégoire-le-Grand -Sainte-Gertrude -Très-Précieux-Sang-de-Notre-Seigneur	805	Bécancour
Sainte-Anne-du-Sault	Municipality		March 9, 2016	Annexed	1,268	Daveluyville
Sainte-Gertrude	Parish		October 17, 1965	Merged with: -Bécancourt -Gentilly -La Rochelle -Laval -Villers -Bécancour -Saint-Edouard-de-Gentilly -Saint-Grégoire-le-Grand -Sainte-Angèle-de-Laval -Très-Précieux-Sang-de-Notre-Seigneur	1,091	Bécancour
Sainte-Julie	Municipality	Sainte-Julie-de-Somerset (1855-1858), Somerset-Nord (1858-1950)	November 26, 1997	Merged with Laurierville	671	Laurierville
Sainte-Marie	Village		December 23, 1976	Merged with Sainte-Marie-de-Blandford	181	Sainte-Marie-de-Blandford
Sainte-Philomène-de-Fortierville	Parish		June 3, 1998	Merged with Fortierville	286	Fortierville
Sainte-Sophie	Municipality		December 17, 1997	Merged with Halifax-Nord	317	Sainte-Sophie-d'Halifax
Sainte-Victoire-d'Arthabaska	Parish		June 23, 1993	Merged with: -Arthabaska -Victoriaville	7,313	Victoriaville-Arthabaska_{(Now named Victoriaville)}
Très-Précieux-Sang-de-Notre-Seigneur	Parish		October 17, 1965	Merged with: -Bécancourt -Gentilly -La Rochelle -Laval -Villers -Bécancour -Saint-Edouard-de-Gentilly -Saint-Grégoire-le-Grand -Sainte-Angèle-de-Laval -Sainte-Gertrude	482	Bécancour
Vianney	Municipality	Sud-Ouest-du-Canton-d’Halifax-Sud (1913–1981)	November 29, 2000	Annexed	183	Saint-Ferdinand
Villers	Village		October 17, 1965	Merged with: -Bécancourt -Gentilly -La Rochelle -Laval -Bécancour -Saint-Edouard-de-Gentilly -Saint-Grégoire-le-Grand -Sainte-Angèle-de-Laval -Sainte-Gertrude -Très-Précieux-Sang-de-Notre-Seigneur	362	Bécancour

== See also ==
- Municipal history of Quebec
- List of municipalities in Quebec
- 2000–06 municipal reorganization in Quebec
- 2002–2006 municipal reorganization of Montreal
- Amalgamation of the Halifax Regional Municipality
- Amalgamation of Toronto
- Amalgamation of Winnipeg
- Edmonton annexations
- List of municipal amalgamations in Alberta
- List of municipal amalgamations in New Brunswick
- Manitoba municipal amalgamations, 2015
