= Saint-Eugène, Chaudière-Appalaches, Quebec =

Human settlement in L'Islet, Quebec, Canada

Coordinates: 47°05′25″N 70°19′55″W

Saint-Eugène (French pronunciation: [sɛ̃t‿øʒɛn]) was a former parish municipality in the Chaudière-Appalaches region of Quebec. On January 1, 2000, it amalgamated with L'Islet and L'Islet-sur-Mer to form a new municipality which was initially called L'Islet-sur-Mer–Saint-Eugène–L'Islet but soon changed its name to simply L'Islet.
