= Lac-des-Aigles =

- City
- Aerial view of Lac-des-Aigles

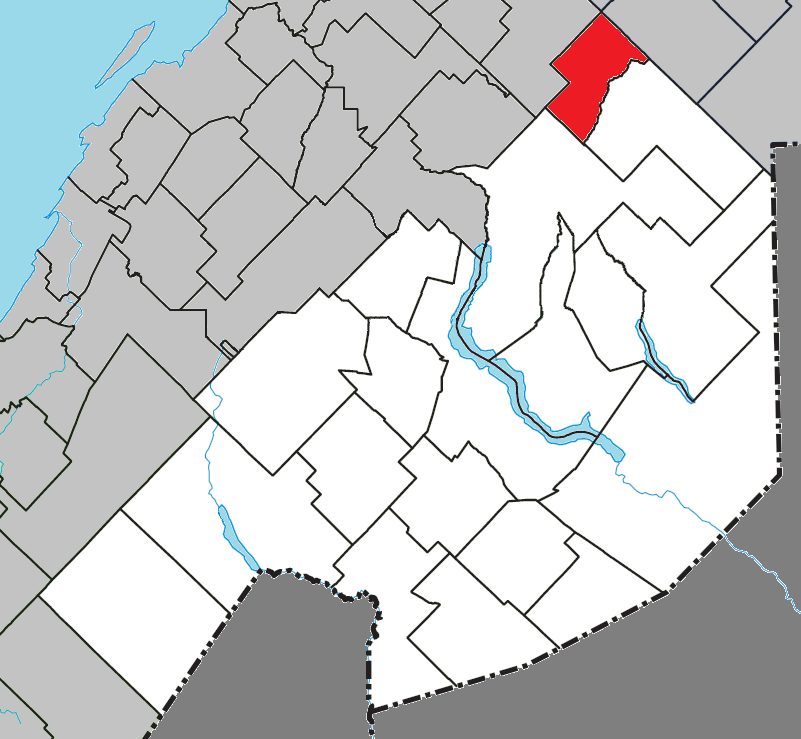
- Location within Témiscouata RCM

- Location in eastern Quebec
- Coordinates: 47.9886°N 68.6764°W
- Country: Canada
- Province: Quebec
- Region: Bas-Saint-Laurent
- RCM: Témiscouata
- Constituted: July 31, 2024

Government
  - Mayor: Michel Dubé
  - Federal riding: Côte-du-Sud—Rivière-du-Loup—Kataskomiq—Témiscouata (Lac-des-Aigles), Rimouski-Neigette—Mitis—Matapédia—Les Basques (Saint-Guy)
  - Prov. riding: Rivière-du-Loup–Témiscouata–Les Basques

Area
  - Total: 235.02 km^{2} (90.74 sq mi)
  - Land: 226.17 km^{2} (87.32 sq mi)

Population (2021)
  - Total: 571
  - Density: 2.5/km^{2} (6.5/sq mi)
  - Pop 2016-2021: ▲0.8%
  - Dwellings: 354
- Time zone: UTC−5 (EST)
  - Summer (DST): UTC−4 (EDT)
- Postal code(s): G0K 1V0, G0K 1W0
- Area codes: 418 and 581
- Highways: R-232; R-296
- Website: www.lacdesaigles.ca/

Lac-des-Aigles (French pronunciation: [lak dez‿ɛɡl]) is a city in the Témiscouata Regional County Municipality of the Bas-Saint-Laurent region of Quebec, Canada. The population is 571. Its economy is mainly based on agriculture and forestry. It is located southeast of Rimouski, near Esprit-Saint. It was created on July 31, 2024 by the merger of the municipalities of Lac-des-Aigles and Saint-Guy.

== History ==
Settlement of the area began in 1931 with the arrival of land-clearers from Saint-Clément, Saint-Hubert, Bégon and Hocquart, who were short of space. The municipality of Lac-des-Aigles was officially created in 1948. On July 31, 2024, the municipalities of Saint-Guy and Lac-des-Aigles merged to form the town of Lac-des-Aigles.

== Geography ==
=== Climate ===
Climate data for Lac-des-Aigles, Quebec: 320 m (1050 ft) (1981–2010 normals, extremes 1963–2004)
Month	Jan	Feb	Mar	Apr	May	Jun	Jul	Aug	Sep	Oct	Nov	Dec	Year
Record high °C (°F)	11.5 (52.7)	10.5 (50.9)	16.7 (62.1)	26.5 (79.7)	31.7 (89.1)	32.0 (89.6)	33.5 (92.3)	33.3 (91.9)	30.0 (86.0)	25.0 (77.0)	17.5 (63.5)	10.5 (50.9)	33.5 (92.3)
Mean daily maximum °C (°F)	−9.7 (14.5)	−7.3 (18.9)	−1.5 (29.3)	6.1 (43.0)	14.9 (58.8)	20.3 (68.5)	22.6 (72.7)	21.5 (70.7)	15.8 (60.4)	8.8 (47.8)	0.7 (33.3)	−5.7 (21.7)	7.2 (45.0)
Daily mean °C (°F)	−14.5 (5.9)	−12.4 (9.7)	−6.5 (20.3)	1.4 (34.5)	9.1 (48.4)	14.5 (58.1)	17.0 (62.6)	15.8 (60.4)	10.7 (51.3)	4.5 (40.1)	−2.9 (26.8)	−9.9 (14.2)	2.2 (36.0)
Mean daily minimum °C (°F)	−19.4 (−2.9)	−17.5 (0.5)	−11.6 (11.1)	−3.3 (26.1)	3.3 (37.9)	8.5 (47.3)	11.3 (52.3)	10.1 (50.2)	5.5 (41.9)	0.1 (32.2)	−6.4 (20.5)	−14.0 (6.8)	−2.8 (27.0)
Record low °C (°F)	−37.0 (−34.6)	−34.5 (−30.1)	−31.0 (−23.8)	−22.5 (−8.5)	−10.6 (12.9)	−3.0 (26.6)	2.2 (36.0)	−1.5 (29.3)	−6.7 (19.9)	−13.3 (8.1)	−22.5 (−8.5)	−33.5 (−28.3)	−37.0 (−34.6)
Average precipitation mm (inches)	99.2 (3.91)	85.2 (3.35)	85.7 (3.37)	94.8 (3.73)	111.9 (4.41)	114.2 (4.50)	132.9 (5.23)	113.9 (4.48)	109.8 (4.32)	113.3 (4.46)	108.2 (4.26)	101.8 (4.01)	1,270.9 (50.03)
Average snowfall cm (inches)	87.4 (34.4)	74.4 (29.3)	69.0 (27.2)	44.2 (17.4)	6.2 (2.4)	0.0 (0.0)	0.0 (0.0)	0.0 (0.0)	0.3 (0.1)	9.3 (3.7)	51.3 (20.2)	84.9 (33.4)	427 (168.1)
Average precipitation days (≥ 0.2 mm)	18.7	15.7	16.2	14.3	15.3	14.6	15.8	15.5	16.1	16.3	18.4	18.9	195.8
Average snowy days (≥ 0.2 cm)	18.0	15.2	14.6	8.1	1.3	0.0	0.0	0.0	0.1	3.1	12.9	17.8	91.0
Source: Environment Canada

== Demographics ==
=== Population ===
Canada census – Lac-des-Aigles community profile

	2021	2016	2011
Population	495 (-3.3% from 2016)	512 (-7.1% from 2011)	551 (-9.5% from 2006)
Land area	86.63 km^{2} (33.45 sq mi)	86.67 km^{2} (33.46 sq mi)	87.06 km^{2} (33.61 sq mi)
Population density	5.7/km^{2} (15/sq mi)	5.9/km^{2} (15/sq mi)	6.3/km^{2} (16/sq mi)
Median age	53.6 (M: 55.2, F: 53.2)	51.5 (M: 51.5, F: 51.5)	47.2 (M: 46.6, F: 47.7)
Private dwellings	289 (total)	286 (total)	284 (total)
Median household income	$58,000	$42,880	$41,015

References: 2021 2016 2011

Historical Census Data - Lac-des-Aigles, Quebec
Year	Pop.	±%
1951	1,537	—
1956	1,698	+10.5%
1961	1,547	−8.9%
1966	1,262	−18.4%
1971	958	−24.1%
1976	787	−17.8%
1981	789	+0.3%
1986	746	−5.4%
1991	678	−9.1%
1996	644	−5.0%
2001	657	+2.0%
2006	609	−7.3%
2011	551	−9.5%
2016	512	−7.1%
2021	495	−3.3%

=== Language ===
Canada Census Mother Tongue - Lac-des-Aigles, Quebec
Census	Total	French			English			French & English			Other		
Year	Responses	Count	Trend	Pop %	Count	Trend	Pop %	Count	Trend	Pop %	Count	Trend	Pop %
2021	495	490	▼3.0%	99.0%	0	0.0%	0.0%	0	▼100.0%	0.0%	0	0.0%	0.0%
2016	515	505	▼6.5%	98.1%	0	▼100.0%	0.0%	5	▲ n/a%	1.0%	0	▼100.0%	0.0%
2011	550	540	▼9.2%	98.2%	5	▼50.0%	0.9%	0	0.0%	0.0%	5	▼50.0%	0.9%
2006	610	595	▼7.8%	97.5%	10	▲ n/a%	1.6%	0	0.0%	0.0%	10	▲ n/a%	1.6%
2001	655	645	▲0.8%	98.5%	0	0.0%	0.0%	0	0.0%	0.0%	0	0.0%	0.0%
1996	640	640	n/a	100.0%	0	n/a	0.0%	0	n/a	0.0%	0	n/a	0.0%

== Government ==
The southern part of Lac-des-Aigles forms part of the federal electoral district of Côte-du-Sud—Rivière-du-Loup—Kataskomiq—Témiscouata, which has been represented by Bernard Généreux of the Conservative Party of Canada since 2025. Meanwhile, the former municipality of Saint-Guy belongs to the riding of Rimouski-Neigette—Mitis—Matapédia—Les Basques and has been represented by Maxime Blanchette-Joncas of the Bloc Québécois since 2019. Provincially, Lac-des-Aigles is part of the Rivière-du-Loup–Témiscouata–Les Basques electoral district and is represented by Ariane Boyer of the Parti Québécois since 2026.

== See also ==
- List of cities in Quebec
