= Sacré-Cœur-de-Jésus, Lanaudière, Quebec =

Former parish municipality in Lanaudière, Quebec, Canada

Coordinates: 45.963°N 73.484°W

Sacré-Cœur-de-Jésus (French pronunciation: [sakʁe kœʁ də ʒezy]) was a former municipality in the Joliette Regional County Municipality in the Lanaudière region of Quebec.

On February 2, 1991, it changed its name and its status to the municipality of Sacré-Cœur-de-Crabtree to avoid confusion with a different parish municipality also called Sacré-Cœur-de-Jésus, in the Chaudière-Appalaches region. On October 23, 1996, Sacré-Cœur-de-Crabtree and the municipality of Crabtree (formerly a village, until June 12, 1993) amalgamated to form a new municipality, the modern-day municipality of Crabtree, Quebec.
