= Saint-Gérard-Majella, Lanaudière, Quebec =

Saint-Gérard-Majella
- Former municipality
- Location in Quebec
- Coordinates: 45°53′50″N 73°25′50″W
- Country: Canada
- Province: Quebec
- Region: Lanaudière
- RCM: L'Assomption
- settled: 1719

Saint-Gérard-Majella (French pronunciation: [sɛ̃ ʒeʁaʁ maʒɛla]) is a village and former parish municipality in the Lanaudière region of Quebec. On 1 July 2000 it merged into L'Assomption, Quebec. Earlier, on 24 May 2000, parts of its territory had been annexed to Crabtree and to Saint-Paul.
