= Saint-Guy, Quebec =

Saint-Guy
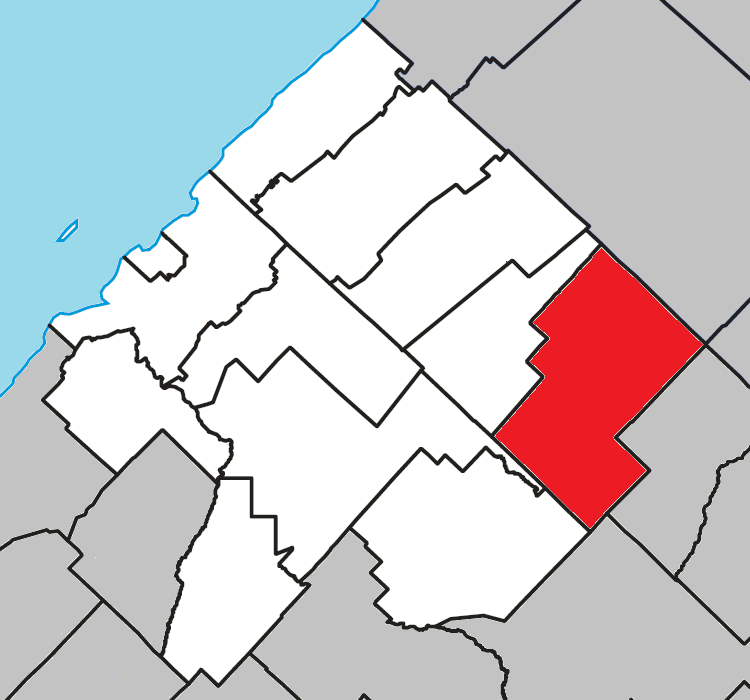
- Location within Les Basques RCM

- Location in eastern Quebec
- Coordinates: 48°02′N 68°47′W
- Country: Canada
- Province: Quebec
- Region: Bas-Saint-Laurent
- RCM: Les Basques
- Constituted: January 1, 1958

Government
  - Mayor: Roger Rioux
  - Federal riding: Rimouski-Neigette—Témiscouata —Les Basques
  - Prov. riding: Rivière-du-Loup-Témiscouata

Area
  - Total: 143.10 km^{2} (55.25 sq mi)
  - Land: 139.54 km^{2} (53.88 sq mi)

Population (2021)
  - Total: 76
  - Density: 0.5/km^{2} (1.3/sq mi)
  - Pop 2016-2021: ▲40.7%
  - Dwellings: 65
- Time zone: UTC−5 (EST)
  - Summer (DST): UTC−4 (EDT)
- Postal code(s): G0K 1W0
- Area codes: 418 and 581
- Highways: R-296

Saint-Guy is a former municipality in the Bas-Saint-Laurent region of Quebec, Canada, now part of the city of Lac-des-Aigles.

== Climate ==
Climate data for Saint-Guy, Quebec: 320 m (1050 ft) (1981–2010 normals, extremes 1963–2004)
Month	Jan	Feb	Mar	Apr	May	Jun	Jul	Aug	Sep	Oct	Nov	Dec	Year
Record high °C (°F)	11.5 (52.7)	10.5 (50.9)	16.7 (62.1)	26.5 (79.7)	31.7 (89.1)	32.0 (89.6)	33.5 (92.3)	33.3 (91.9)	30.0 (86.0)	25.0 (77.0)	17.5 (63.5)	10.5 (50.9)	33.5 (92.3)
Mean daily maximum °C (°F)	−9.7 (14.5)	−7.3 (18.9)	−1.5 (29.3)	6.1 (43.0)	14.9 (58.8)	20.3 (68.5)	22.6 (72.7)	21.5 (70.7)	15.8 (60.4)	8.8 (47.8)	0.7 (33.3)	−5.7 (21.7)	7.2 (45.0)
Daily mean °C (°F)	−14.5 (5.9)	−12.4 (9.7)	−6.5 (20.3)	1.4 (34.5)	9.1 (48.4)	14.5 (58.1)	17.0 (62.6)	15.8 (60.4)	10.7 (51.3)	4.5 (40.1)	−2.9 (26.8)	−9.9 (14.2)	2.2 (36.0)
Mean daily minimum °C (°F)	−19.4 (−2.9)	−17.5 (0.5)	−11.6 (11.1)	−3.3 (26.1)	3.3 (37.9)	8.5 (47.3)	11.3 (52.3)	10.1 (50.2)	5.5 (41.9)	0.1 (32.2)	−6.4 (20.5)	−14.0 (6.8)	−2.8 (27.0)
Record low °C (°F)	−37.0 (−34.6)	−34.5 (−30.1)	−31.0 (−23.8)	−22.5 (−8.5)	−10.6 (12.9)	−3.0 (26.6)	2.2 (36.0)	−1.5 (29.3)	−6.7 (19.9)	−13.3 (8.1)	−22.5 (−8.5)	−33.5 (−28.3)	−37.0 (−34.6)
Average precipitation mm (inches)	99.2 (3.91)	85.2 (3.35)	85.7 (3.37)	94.8 (3.73)	111.9 (4.41)	114.2 (4.50)	132.9 (5.23)	113.9 (4.48)	109.8 (4.32)	113.3 (4.46)	108.2 (4.26)	101.8 (4.01)	1,270.9 (50.03)
Average snowfall cm (inches)	87.4 (34.4)	74.4 (29.3)	69.0 (27.2)	44.2 (17.4)	6.2 (2.4)	0.0 (0.0)	0.0 (0.0)	0.0 (0.0)	0.3 (0.1)	9.3 (3.7)	51.3 (20.2)	84.9 (33.4)	427 (168.1)
Average precipitation days (≥ 0.2 mm)	18.7	15.7	16.2	14.3	15.3	14.6	15.8	15.5	16.1	16.3	18.4	18.9	195.8
Average snowy days (≥ 0.2 cm)	18.0	15.2	14.6	8.1	1.3	0.0	0.0	0.0	0.1	3.1	12.9	17.8	91.0
Source: Environment Canada

== Demographics ==
=== Population ===
Canada census – Saint-Guy community profile

	2021	2016	2011
Population	76 (-40.7% from 2016)	54 (-40.7% from 2011)	91 (+2.2% from 2006)
Land area	139.54 km^{2} (53.88 sq mi)	139.82 km^{2} (53.98 sq mi)	139.05 km^{2} (53.69 sq mi)
Population density	0.5/km^{2} (1.3/sq mi)	0.4/km^{2} (1.0/sq mi)	0.7/km^{2} (1.8/sq mi)
Median age	61.2 (M: 60.78, F: 61.2)	63.5 (M: 60.7, F: 68.0)	54.5 (M: 55.0, F: 54.2)
Private dwellings	65 (total)	66 (total)	72 (total)
Median household income		$31,680	$.N/A

Notes: Income data for this area has been suppressed for data quality or confidentiality reasons.
References: 2021 2016 2011

Historical Census Data - Saint-Guy, Quebec
Year	Pop.	±%
1991	157	—
1996	108	−31.2%
2001	106	−1.9%
2006	89	−16.0%
2011	91	+2.2%
2016	54	−40.7%
2021	76	+40.7%

=== Language ===
Canada Census Mother Tongue - Saint-Guy, Quebec
Census	Total	French			English			French & English			Other		
Year	Responses	Count	Trend	Pop %	Count	Trend	Pop %	Count	Trend	Pop %	Count	Trend	Pop %
2021	80	75	▲36.4%	93.8%	0	0.0%	0.0%	0	0.0%	0.0%	0	0.0%	0.0%
2016	55	55	▼38.9%	100.0%	0	0.0%	0.0%	0	▼100.0%	0.0%	0	0.0%	0.0%
2011	95	90	▲11.1%	94.7%	0	0.0%	0.0%	5	▲ n/a%	5.3%	0	0.0%	0.0%
2006	80	80	▼15.8%	100.0%	0	0.0%	0.0%	0	0.0%	0.0%	0	0.0%	0.0%
2001	95	95	0.0%	100.0%	0	0.0%	0.0%	0	0.0%	0.0%	0	0.0%	0.0%
1996	95	95	n/a	100.0%	0	n/a	0.0%	0	n/a	0.0%	0	n/a	0.0%

== See also ==
- List of former municipalities in Quebec
