= Norbertville, Quebec =

Former village municipality in Quebec, Canada

Coordinates: 46°6′38.1″N 71°49′27.4″W

Norbertville, Quebec is a former village in Centre-du-Québec, Quebec, Canada. Route 263 goes through it. Its population was 266 as of the 2006 census.

It was merged into Saint-Norbert-d'Arthabaska as of October 21, 2009.

== Sources ==
- (Google Maps)
