= Saint-Gédéon, Chaudière-Appalaches, Quebec =

Coordinates: 45°51′09″N 70°38′25″W

Saint-Gédéon was the name of both a former village municipality and a former parish municipality in the Chaudière-Appalaches region of Quebec.

On July 19, 1997, the village municipality of Saint-Gédéon became the municipality of Saint-Gédéon-de-Beauce. On February 12, 2003, the parish municipality of Saint-Gédéon merged into Saint-Gédéon-de-Beauce.
