= L'Assomption =

- City
- Ville de L'Assomption
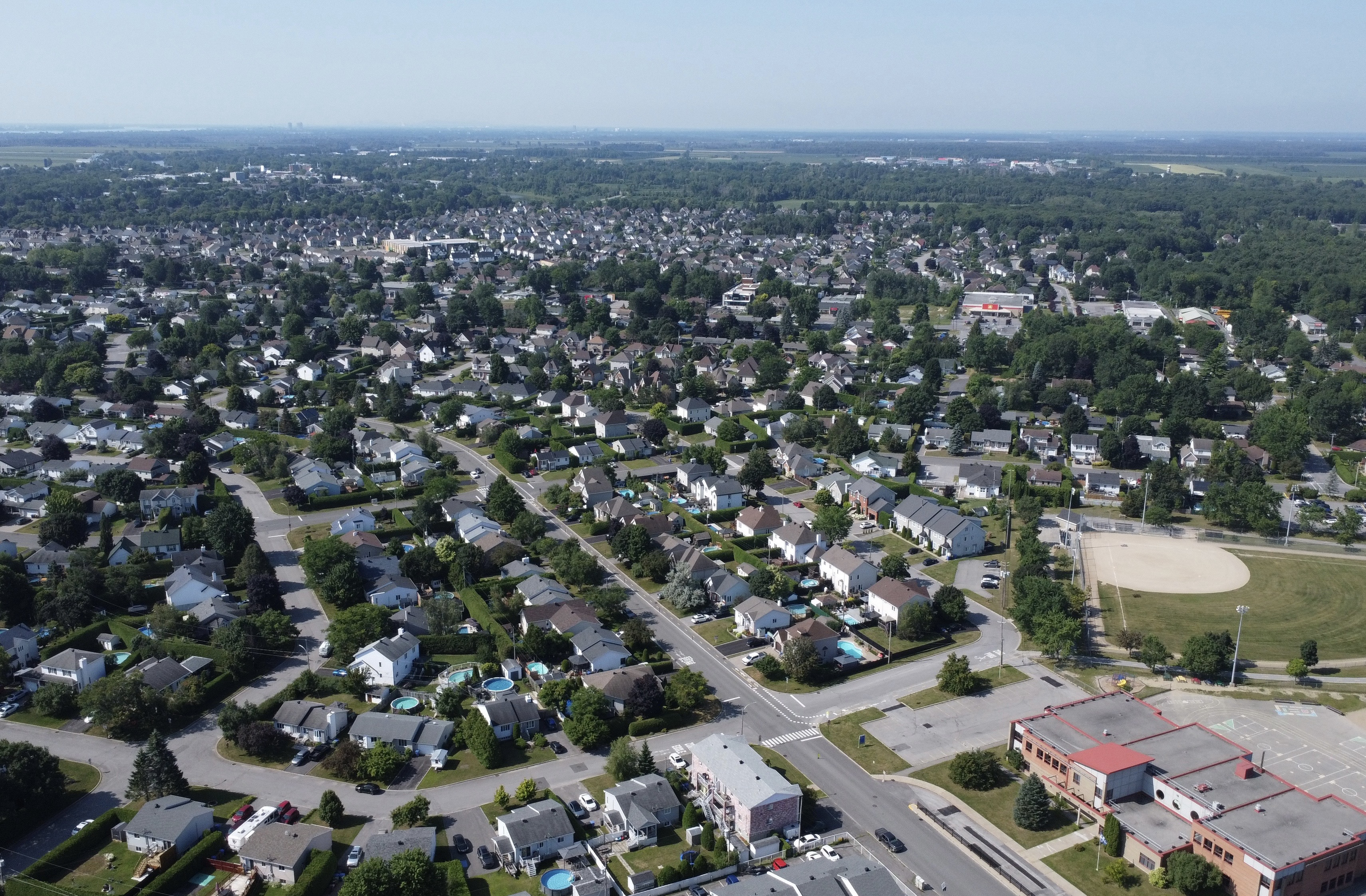

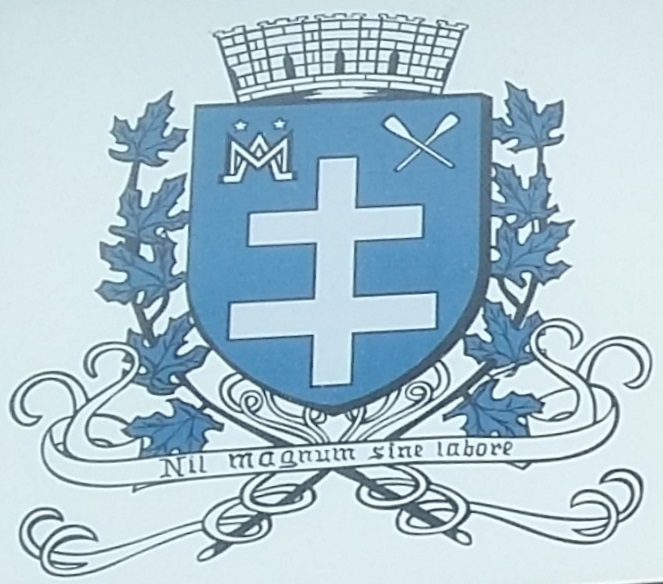
- Coat of arms

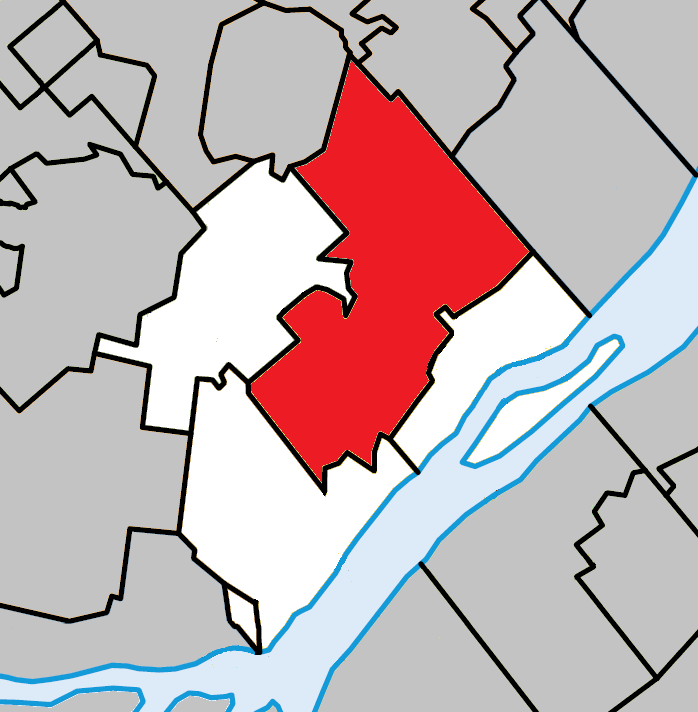
- Location within L'Assomption RCM

- Location in central Quebec
- Coordinates: 45°48′40″N 73°25′53″W
- Country: Canada
- Province: Quebec
- Region: Lanaudière
- RCM: L'Assomption
- Settled: 1670s
- Constituted: July 1, 2000

Government
  - Mayor: Sébastien Nadeau
  - Fed. riding: Repentigny
  - Prov. riding: L'Assomption

Area
  - Total: 100.99 km^{2} (38.99 sq mi)
  - Land: 98.74 km^{2} (38.12 sq mi)
  - Urban: 11.63 km^{2} (4.49 sq mi)

Population (2021)
  - Total: 23,442
  - Density: 237.4/km^{2} (615/sq mi)
  - Urban: 16,443
  - Urban density: 1,413.7/km^{2} (3,661/sq mi)
  - Change 2016–21: ▲4.5%
  - Dwellings: 9,369
- Time zone: UTC−05:00 (EST)
  - Summer (DST): UTC−04:00 (EDT)
- Postal code(s): J5W
- Area codes: 450, 579
- Highways A-40: R-339 R-341; R-343 R-344
- Website: www.ville.lassomption.qc.ca

L'Assomption (French pronunciation: [lasɔ̃psjɔ̃]) is an off-island suburb of Montreal, in southwestern Quebec, Canada, on the L'Assomption River. It is the seat of the Regional County Municipality of L'Assomption. It is located on the outer fringes of the Montreal urban area.

L'Assomption incorporated as a city in 1992. Its population was 20,065 in 2011.

Most of the economy of L'Assomption depends on the agricultural industries of the surrounding plains. It is also the cultural centre of the region.

== History ==
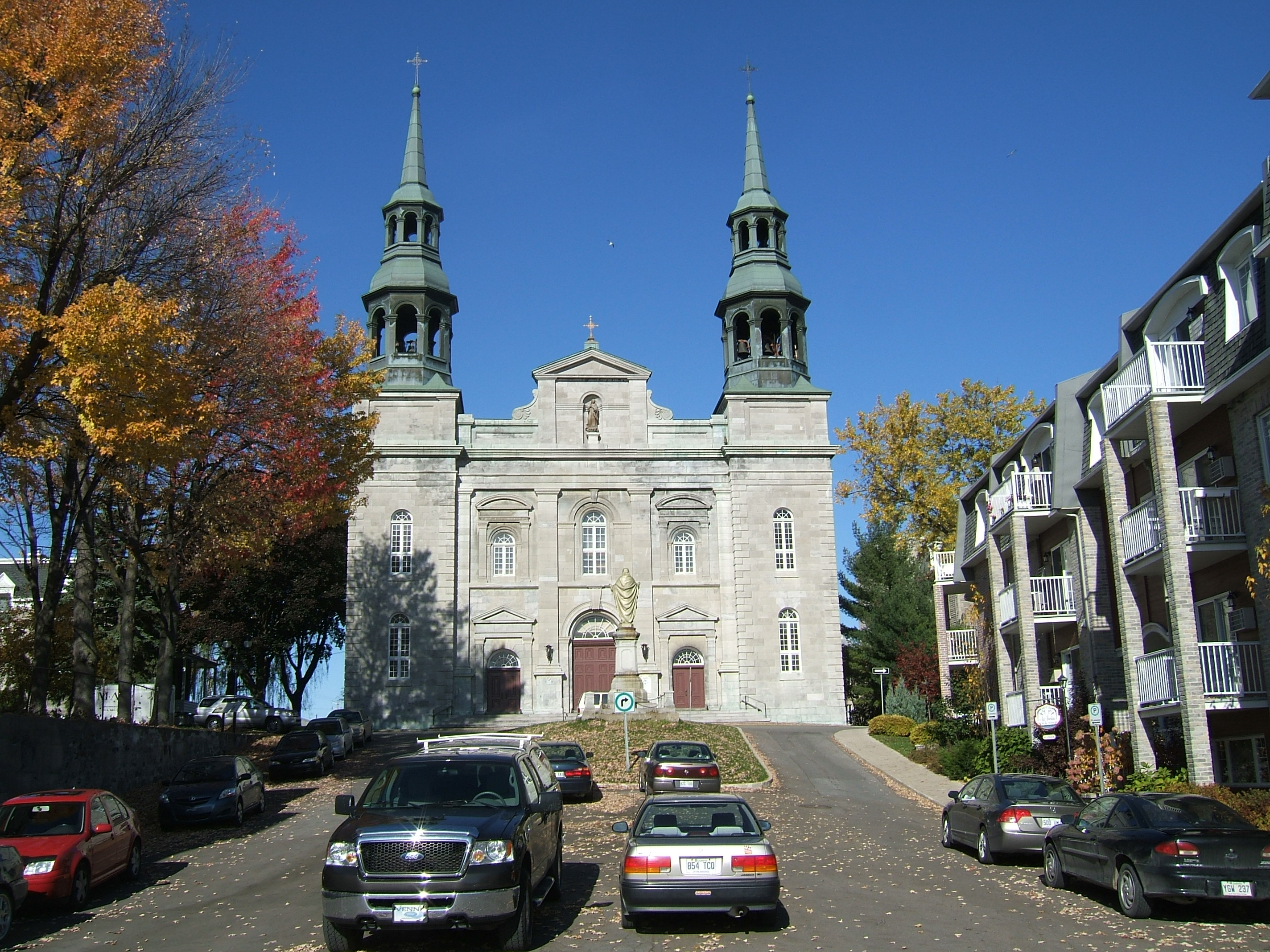

In 1647, the L'Assomption Seignory was granted to Pierre Legardeur de Repentigny and was named after the river that had been named as such since the 17th century. Between 1640 and 1700, a settlement formed inside a large horseshoe-shaped meander of the L'Assomption River. Amerindians had already been visiting the site since ancient times and called it Outaragasipi,meaning "Winding River," in reference to the river's course. Since they would drag their canoes across the peninsula as a shortcut for the meandre, the settlement was first called Le Portage.

In 1717, the parish was formed and would be known as Saint-Pierre-du-Portage-de-l'Assomption and also as Saint-Pierre-et-Saint-Paul-du-Portage. In 1766, the village saw an influx of Acadian settlers. Between 1774 and 1888, L'Assomption was the most prosperous and important town between Montreal and Trois-Rivières.

In 1845, the L'Assomption Municipality was established. It was abolished in 1847 but reestablished as a parish municipality in 1855. In 1846, the village itself became a separate village municipality and obtained town status in 1888.

In 1992, the town and the parish municipalities were merged again, and on July 1, 2000, the neighbouring parish municipality of Saint-Gérard-Majella was merged withVille de L'Assomption.

In December 2010, the 1,300-worker Electrolux factory announced that it would close and relocate to Memphis, Tennessee.

== Geography ==
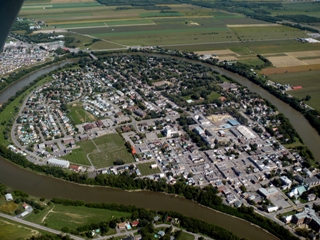

Communities:

- Domaine-Beaudoin-Papin
- Domaine-des-Fleurs
- L'Assomption
- Saint-Gérard-Majella

=== Climate ===
Climate data for L'Assomption (1991–2020 normals, extremes 1930–2020)
Month	Jan	Feb	Mar	Apr	May	Jun	Jul	Aug	Sep	Oct	Nov	Dec	Year
Record high °C (°F)	12.8 (55.0)	11.0 (51.8)	26.0 (78.8)	31.0 (87.8)	36.2 (97.2)	36.1 (97.0)	37.2 (99.0)	37.2 (99.0)	36.7 (98.1)	29.4 (84.9)	22.3 (72.1)	16.4 (61.5)	37.2 (99.0)
Mean daily maximum °C (°F)	−5.9 (21.4)	−4.0 (24.8)	1.8 (35.2)	10.8 (51.4)	19.2 (66.6)	24.3 (75.7)	26.6 (79.9)	25.5 (77.9)	21.1 (70.0)	13.0 (55.4)	5.4 (41.7)	−1.9 (28.6)	11.3 (52.3)
Daily mean °C (°F)	−10.9 (12.4)	−9.4 (15.1)	−3.2 (26.2)	5.5 (41.9)	13.2 (55.8)	18.4 (65.1)	20.7 (69.3)	19.6 (67.3)	15.2 (59.4)	8.1 (46.6)	1.3 (34.3)	−6.1 (21.0)	6.0 (42.8)
Mean daily minimum °C (°F)	−16.0 (3.2)	−14.8 (5.4)	−8.3 (17.1)	0.1 (32.2)	7.2 (45.0)	12.4 (54.3)	14.8 (58.6)	13.7 (56.7)	9.2 (48.6)	3.2 (37.8)	−2.7 (27.1)	−10.2 (13.6)	0.7 (33.3)
Record low °C (°F)	−43.3 (−45.9)	−43.3 (−45.9)	−40.6 (−41.1)	−19.4 (−2.9)	−7.2 (19.0)	−1.7 (28.9)	3.3 (37.9)	0.6 (33.1)	−5.5 (22.1)	−12.2 (10.0)	−25.0 (−13.0)	−42.8 (−45.0)	−43.3 (−45.9)
Average relative humidity (%) (at 15:00 LST)	69.1	63.7	58.2	50.0	49.3	53.5	56.1	55.9	57.4	60.8	67.6	73.3	59.6
Source: Environment Canada

== Demographics ==
In the 2021 Census of Population conducted by Statistics Canada, L'Assomption had a population of 23,442 living in 9,206 of its 9,369 total private dwellings, a change of 4.5% from its 2016 population of 22,429. With a land area of 98.74 km^{2} (38.12 sq mi), it had a population density of 237.4/km^{2} (614.9/sq mi) in 2021.

Canada census – L'Assomption community profile

	2021	2016	2011
Population	23,442 (+4.5% from 2016)	22,429 (+11.8% from 2011)	20,065 (+20.0% from 2006)
Land area	98.74 km^{2} (38.12 sq mi)	98.99 km^{2} (38.22 sq mi)	98.90 km^{2} (38.19 sq mi)
Population density	237.4/km^{2} (615/sq mi)	226.6/km^{2} (587/sq mi)	202.9/km^{2} (526/sq mi)
Median age	40.0 (M: 39.2, F: 40.4)	38.5 (M: 37.9, F: 39.1)	37.9 (M: 37.2, F: 38.7)
Private dwellings	9,369 (total) 9,206 (occupied)	8,932 (total)	8,189 (total)
Median household income	$87,000	$74,159	$61,590

References: 2021 2016 2011

Historical Census Data – L'Assomption, Quebec

Year	Pop.	±%
1851	1,084	—
1861	1,279	+18.0%
1871	1,210	−5.4%
1881	1,313	+8.5%
1891	1,256	−4.3%
1901	1,605	+27.8%
1911	1,747	+8.8%
1921	1,320	−24.4%
1931	1,576	+19.4%

Year	Pop.	±%
1941	1,829	+16.1%
1951	2,688	+47.0%
1956	3,683	+37.0%
1961	4,448	+20.8%
1966	4,662	+4.8%
1971	4,915	+5.4%
1976	4,832	−1.7%
1981	4,844	+0.2%
1986	5,280	+9.0%

Year	Pop.	±%
1991	5,706	+8.1%
1996	11,366	+99.2%
2001	15,625	+37.5%
2006	16,738	+7.1%
2011	20,065	+19.9%
2016	22,429	+11.8%
2021	23,442	+4.5%

Population counts are not adjusted for boundary changes and mergers.
Source: Statistics Canada

Canada Census Mother Tongue – L'Assomption, Quebec
Census	Total	French			English			French & English			Other		
Year	Responses	Count	Trend	Pop %	Count	Trend	Pop %	Count	Trend	Pop %	Count	Trend	Pop %
2021	23,245	21,775	▲2.4%	93.7%	245	▲19.5%	1.1%	165	▲43.5%	0.7%	865	▲61.7%	3.7%
2016	22,220	21,270	▲11.0%	95.7%	205	▲5.1%	0.9%	115	▲15.0%	0.5%	535	▲50.7%	2.4%
2011	19,815	19,165	▲19.0%	96.7%	195	▼2.5%	1.0%	100	▲185.7%	0.5%	355	▲77.5%	1.8%
2006	16,545	16,110	▲7.5%	97.4%	200	▲8.1%	1.2%	35	▼22.2%	0.2%	200	▲53.8%	1.2%
2001	15,340	14,980	▲37.8%	97.7%	185	▲131.2%	1.2%	45	▲28.6%	0.3%	130	▲160.0%	0.9%
1996	11,035	10,870	n/a	98.5%	80	n/a	0.7%	35	n/a	0.3%	50	n/a	0.5%

== Education ==
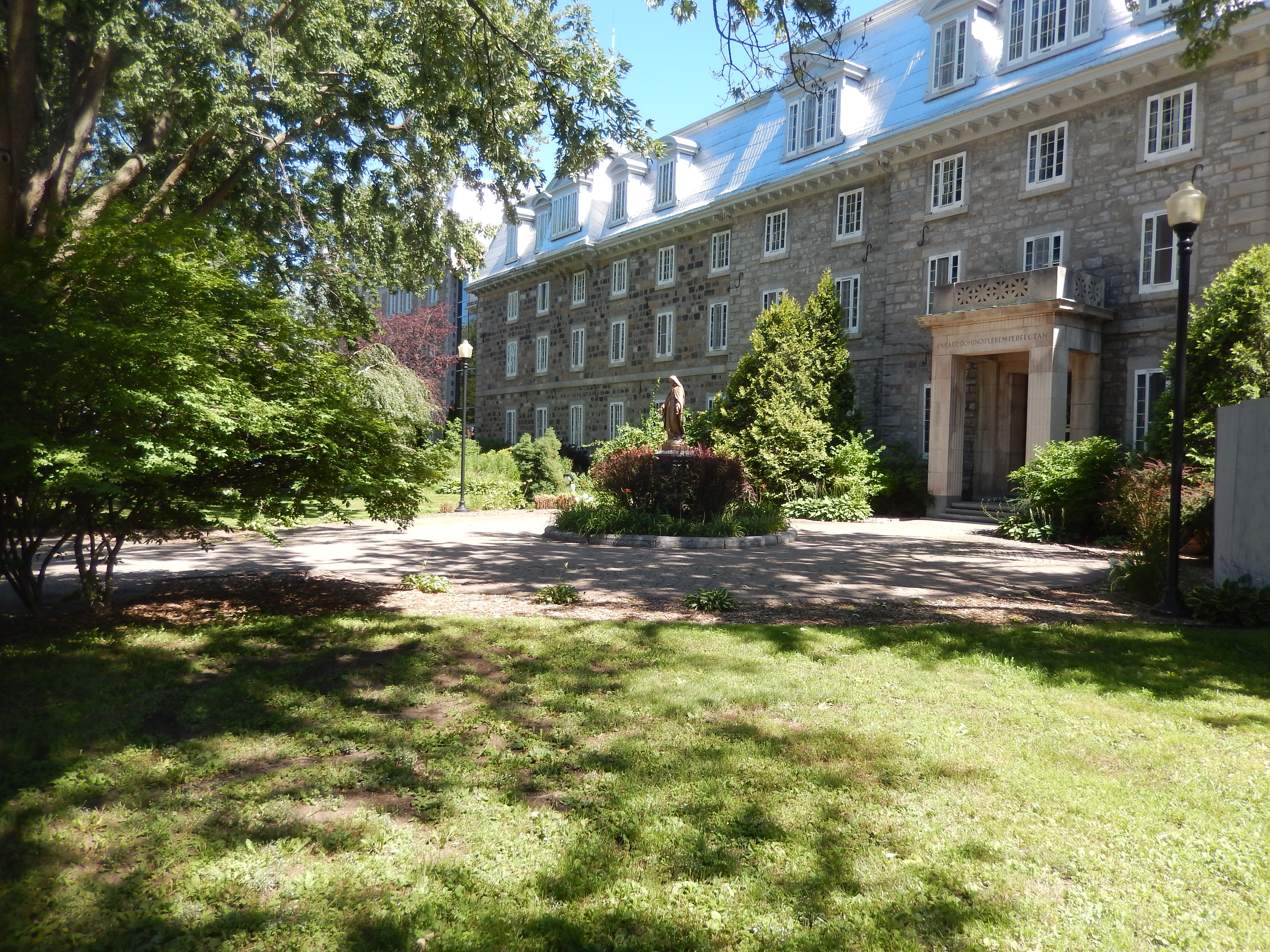
The Collège de l'Assomption was founded in 1832. The school building has remained on the same site since its creation, making it an official historical site.

The Sir Wilfrid Laurier School Board operates anglophone public schools, including:

- Joliette Elementary School in Saint-Charles-Borromée

The Commission scolaire des Affluents is the main school board in the region. It operates many francophone public schools, both at the elementary and high school levels, including:

- Paul-Arseneau High School in l'Assomption
- Armand-Corbeil High School in Terrebonne
- Jean-Baptiste Meilleur High School in Repentigny
- Point-du-Jour Elementary School in l'Assomption

The city is also home to the Collège de l'Assomption, a private High School of historical renown, as well as the Cégep Régional de Lanaudière in l'Assomption.

== See also ==
- List of cities in Quebec
