= L'Islet-sur-Mer, Quebec =

Coordinates: 47.128453°N 70.371089°W

L'Islet-sur-Mer is an unincorporated community in L'Islet, Quebec, Canada. It is recognized as a designated place by Statistics Canada.

== Demographics ==
In the 2021 Census of Population conducted by Statistics Canada, L'Islet-sur-Mer had a population of 652 living in 294 of its 315 total private dwellings, a change of 2% from its 2016 population of 639. With a land area of 1.69 km^{2} (0.65 sq mi), it had a population density of 385.8/km^{2} (999.2/sq mi) in 2021.

== See also ==
- List of communities in Quebec
- List of designated places in Quebec
