= Victoria Day (disambiguation) =

Victoria Day is a Canadian holiday celebrating the Canadian monarch's official birthday.

Victoria Day may also refer to:

- Victoria Day (Australia), a ceremony celebrating the state of Victoria, Australia
- Victoria Day (Scotland), a holiday in parts of Scotland
- Victoria Day (Sweden), a celebration of Swedish crown princess Victoria's birthday
- Victoria Day (album), a 2009 album by Melissa McClelland
- Victoria Day (film), a 2009 film by David Bezmozgis
- Victoria Day (athlete) (born 1972), British sprinter
