= Public holidays in Canada =

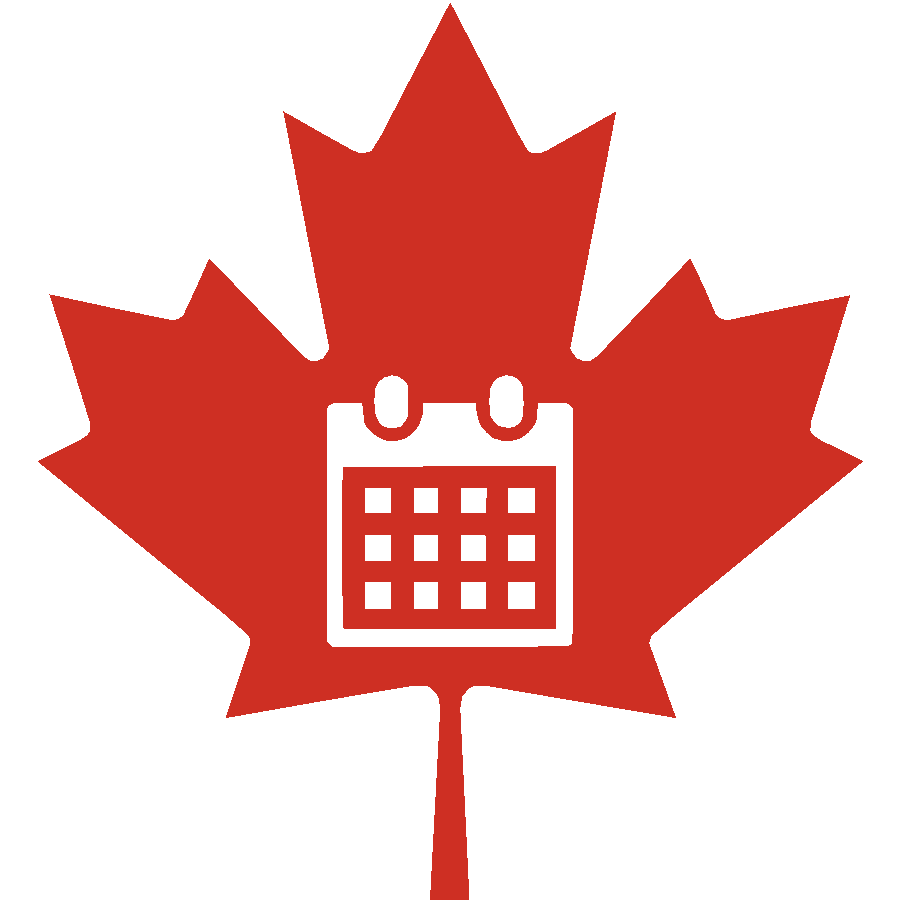
- Also called: French: Jours fériés au Canada
- Observed by: Residents of Canada
- Type: National, provincial, federal
- Celebrations: Various
- Observances: NATIONWIDE (in bold) and FEDERAL (in italics): New Year's Day; Good Friday; Easter Monday; Victoria Day; Canada Day; Civic Holiday; Labour Day; Truth and Reconciliation Day; Thanksgiving Day; Remembrance Day; Christmas Day; Boxing Day

Public holidays in Canada (Note: French: Jours fériés au Canada) known as statutory holidays, stat holidays, or simply stats (French: jours fériés), consist of a variety of cultural, nationalistic, and religious holidays that are legislated in Canada at the federal or provincial and territorial levels. While many of these holidays are honoured and acknowledged nationwide, provincial and territorial legislation varies in regard to which are officially recognized.

There are five nationwide statutory holidays and six additional holidays for federal employees. Each of the 13 provinces and territories observes a number of holidays in addition to the nationwide days, but each varies in regard to which are legislated as either statutory, optional, or not at all.

Many public and private employers, as well as school systems, provide additional days off around the end of December, often including at least a full or half-day on December 24 (Christmas Eve) or December 31 (New Year's Eve) or in some cases, the entire week between Christmas and New Year. While not officially legislated in any capacity, internationally notable cultural holidays such as Valentine's Day, Saint Patrick's Day, Halloween, Mother's Day, and Father's Day are traditionally observed by Canadians as part of Canadian culture.

== Statutory holidays ==
A statutory holiday (also known as "stats" or "general" or "public" holiday) in Canada is legislated either through the federal government or a provincial or territorial government. Most workers, public and private, are entitled to take the day off with regular pay. However, some employers may require employees to work on such a holiday, but the employee must either receive a day off in lieu of the holiday or must be paid at a premium rate – usually 1 1/2 (known as "time and a half") or twice (known as "double time") the regular pay for their time worked that day, in addition to the holiday pay. In most provinces, when a statutory holiday falls on a normal day off (generally a weekend), the following workday is considered a statutory holiday. Statistics Canada shows an average of 11 paid statutory holidays per year in regard to all firms and corporations operating within the province.

=== Nationwide statutory holidays in Canada ===
| Date | English name | French name | Remarks |
|---|---|---|---|
| January 1 | New Year's Day | Jour de l'An | Celebrates the first day of every year in the Gregorian calendar |
| Variable date between March 20 and April 23 | Good Friday | Vendredi saint | Commemorates the crucifixion of Jesus, on the Friday preceding Easter. In Quebec, non-federally regulated employers must give either Good Friday or Easter Monday as a statutory holiday, though some give both days. |
| July 1 | Canada Day | Fête du Canada | Celebrates Canada's 1867 Confederation and establishment of dominion status. In Newfoundland and Labrador, observed concurrently with Memorial Day. |
| First Monday in September | Labour Day | Fête du travail | Celebrates economic and social achievements of workers |
| December 25 | Christmas Day | Noël | Celebrates the nativity of Jesus |

=== Federal statutory holidays, also observed in some provinces ===
In addition to the nationwide holidays listed above, the following holidays are mandated by federal legislation for federally regulated employees. All banks and post offices commemorate these holidays, and they are statutory in some provinces and territories.

| Date | English name | French name | Remarks |
|---|---|---|---|
| In lieu of Good Friday (Stat Holiday), Monday after Easter Day | Easter Monday | Lundi de Pâques | Variable date between March 23 and April 26. Celebrates the resurrection of Jesus. Not a statutory holiday in any province or territory; however, in Quebec employers must give either Good Friday or Easter Monday as a statutory holiday, though most give both days. Banks remain open (legally they cannot close for more than three consecutive days except in emergencies), but employees often receive a "floating" paid day off to be taken on or near the holiday. This is not one of the nine "General Holidays" as defined by the Canada Labour Code – Part III. As such, there is no legal requirement for private sector employers in federally regulated industries to provide Easter Monday as a paid holiday to employees. However, many federal government offices will be closed on this day. |
| Monday preceding May 25 | Victoria Day | Officially la Fête de Victoria (more commonly called la Fête de la Reine) or Journée nationale des Patriotes | Celebrates the birthday of the reigning Canadian monarch; however, the date does not change with the change of monarch, being instead fixed on the birthday of Queen Victoria, the sovereign at the time of Canadian Confederation and establishment of dominion status in 1867. Some French-Canadians celebrate instead Adam Dollard des Ormeaux, a French-Canadian hero from the New France times on this day; officially National Patriots' Day in Quebec. Statutory holiday in Alberta, British Columbia, Manitoba, Northwest Territories, Nunavut, Ontario, Quebec (coincides with National Patriots' Day), Saskatchewan, and Yukon. A holiday in New Brunswick under the Days of Rest Act. Not a statutory holiday in the eastern provinces of Nova Scotia, Prince Edward Island, or Newfoundland and Labrador. |
| First Monday in August | Civic Holiday | Congé civique | Statutory holiday in British Columbia (British Columbia Day), New Brunswick (New Brunswick Day), Northwest Territories (Civic Holiday), Nunavut (Civic Holiday), and Saskatchewan (Saskatchewan Day). Civic holiday (may be a paid vacation day depending on employer) in Alberta (Heritage Day), Manitoba (Terry Fox Day), Ontario (Colonel By Day, John Galt Day, Simcoe Day, and others), and Nova Scotia (Natal Day). Not an official statutory holiday in Ontario, but it is widely observed. Not observed in Newfoundland and Labrador, Quebec, or Yukon. Not observed in Prince Edward Island, though many businesses instead observe a holiday for the Gold Cup Parade, held on the third Friday in August. |
| September 30 | National Day for Truth and Reconciliation | Journée nationale de la vérité et de la réconciliation | Commemorates the victims of the Canadian Indian residential school system. Unofficial observance of this date began in 2013 as Orange Shirt Day, a local educational event in Williams Lake, British Columbia. The day has been a holiday for employees of the federal government and federally-regulated industries since 2021. As of 2023, the day is observed as a statutory holiday for all workers in British Columbia, Prince Edward Island, the Northwest Territories, Nunavut, and Yukon. Schools and some public services close for the day in Manitoba, New Brunswick, Nova Scotia, and Newfoundland and Labrador. |
| Second Monday in October | Thanksgiving Day | Action de grâce | A day to give thanks for the things one has at the close of the harvest season. Statutory holiday in most jurisdictions of Canada: Alberta, British Columbia, Manitoba, Northwest Territories, Nunavut, Ontario, Quebec, Saskatchewan, and Yukon. An optional holiday in the Atlantic provinces of Prince Edward Island, Newfoundland and Labrador, New Brunswick and Nova Scotia. In New Brunswick, included under the Days of Rest Act. |
| November 11 | Remembrance Day | Jour du Souvenir | Commemorates Canada's war dead. Anniversary of the armistice ending World War I in 1918. Statutory holiday in Alberta, British Columbia, New Brunswick, Newfoundland and Labrador, Northwest Territories, Nunavut, Prince Edward Island, Saskatchewan, and Yukon. In Manitoba, an "Official day of Observance", not a statutory holiday. In Nova Scotia, addressed in the Remembrance Day Act, which prohibits employers from allowing employees to work and prohibits employees from working with exceptions for required services. Employers have the option of giving Remembrance Day or an alternate day off. Not a statutory holiday in Quebec and Ontario. |
| December 26 | Boxing Day | Lendemain de Noël | A holiday with mixed and uncertain origins and definitions. Provincially, a statutory holiday in Ontario. A holiday in New Brunswick under the Days of Rest Act. Many employers across the country observe Boxing Day as a paid day off. |

=== Other common holidays ===
| Date | English name | French name | Remarks |
|---|---|---|---|
| Third Monday in February | Family Day; Louis Riel Day (Manitoba); Islander Day (Prince Edward Island); Heritage Day (Nova Scotia) | Fête de la famille; Journée Louis Riel (MB); Fête des Insulaires (PE); Fête du Patrimoine (NS) | Statutory holiday under various names in Alberta, Ontario, Saskatchewan, Manitoba, Prince Edward Island, New Brunswick, and Nova Scotia. British Columbia previously celebrated Family Day on the second Monday in February between 2013 and 2018. However, British Columbia celebrates Family Day on the third Monday in February from 2019 onward. New Brunswick began observing Family Day on the third Monday in February in 2018. Not observed elsewhere. |
| One full week during the month of March (timing varies) | March break; Spring break | Congé de mars; Congé du printemps; Semaine de relâche | Week-long closure of public schools across all provinces and territories. Often used as an opportunity for families with schoolchildren to go on vacation. Although March break rarely coincides with the Easter weekend, in 2018 Prince Edward Island schools considered merging it with the Easter holiday. |

=== One-off holidays ===
Governments in Canada have declared one-off holidays on certain occasions, such as the death of a Canadian monarch. A one-off holiday was declared after the death of George VI on February 15, 1952, and after the death of Elizabeth II on September 19, 2022.

September 19 was named a national day of mourning (French: Jour de deuil national) to commemorate Elizabeth II as Canada's head of state. The day was a holiday for federal government employees. The provinces of British Columbia, New Brunswick, Newfoundland and Labrador, Nova Scotia, and Prince Edward Island also enacted provincial equivalents for the federal holiday. The provinces of Alberta, Ontario, Manitoba, Saskatchewan, and Quebec did not enact any holiday.

== Provincial and territorial holidays ==
Provinces and territories generally adopt the same holidays as the federal government with some variations.

| Date | AB | BC | MB | NB | NL | NT | NS | NU | ON | PE | QC | SK | YT |
|---|---|---|---|---|---|---|---|---|---|---|---|---|---|
| January 1 | New Year's Day | | | | | | | | | | | | |
| Third Monday in February | Family Day | | Louis Riel Day | Family Day | | | Heritage Day | | Family Day | Islander Day | | Family Day | |
| Friday preceding Easter Day (Note: Variable date between March 20 and April 23) | Good Friday (Note: In Quebec, employers must choose between Good Friday and Easter Monday for their statutory holiday.) | | | | | | | | | | | | |
| Monday after Easter Day (Note: Variable date between March 23 and April 26) | | | | | | Easter Monday | | | | | Easter Monday | | |
| Monday preceding May 25 | Victoria Day | | | | | Victoria Day | | Victoria Day | | | National Patriots' Day | Victoria Day | |
| June 21 | | | | | | National Indigenous Peoples Day | | | | | | | National Indigenous Peoples Day |
| June 24 | | | | | | | | | | | Saint-Jean-Baptiste Day | | |
| July 1 | Canada Day | | | | Memorial Day | Canada Day | | | | | | | |
| July 9 | | | | | | | | Nunavut Day | | | | | |
| First Monday in August | | British Columbia Day | | New Brunswick Day | | Civic Holiday | | Civic Holiday | | | | Saskatchewan Day | |
| Third Monday in August | | | | | | | | | | | | | Discovery Day |
| First Monday in September | Labour Day | | | | | | | | | | | | |
| September 30 | | National Day for Truth and Reconciliation | Orange Shirt Day | | | National Day for Truth and Reconciliation | | National Day for Truth and Reconciliation | | National Day for Truth and Reconciliation | | | National Day for Truth and Reconciliation |
| Second Monday in October | Thanksgiving Day | | | | | Thanksgiving Day | | Thanksgiving Day | | | Thanksgiving Day | | |
| November 11 | Remembrance Day | | | Remembrance Day | | | | | | Remembrance Day | | Remembrance Day | |
| December 25 | Christmas Day | | | | | | | | | | | | |
| December 26 | | | | | | Boxing Day | | | Boxing Day | | | | |
| Total stat. holidays | 9 | 11 | 9 | 8 | 6/15 | 13 | 6/7 | 11/13 | 9 | 8 | 8 | 10 | 11 |

=== Alberta ===
Five nationwide statutory holidays, four provincial holidays as well as three "optional holidays".

Provincial statutory

- Alberta Family Day – third Monday in February
- Victoria Day – last Monday preceding May 25
- Thanksgiving – second Monday in October
- Remembrance Day – November 11

Optional

- Easter Monday – variable date between March 23 and April 26
- Heritage Day – first Monday of August
- Alberta Day – September 1
- National Day for Truth and Reconciliation – September 30
- Boxing Day – December 26

=== British Columbia ===
Five nationwide and six provincial statutory holidays.

Provincial statutory

- Family Day – third Monday of February
- Victoria Day – last Monday preceding May 25
- British Columbia Day – first Monday of August
- National Day for Truth and Reconciliation – September 30
- Thanksgiving – second Monday of October
- Remembrance Day – November 11

=== Manitoba ===
Five nationwide and three provincial statutory holidays, as well as two optional holidays. Remembrance Day and Boxing Day are not statutory holidays.

Provincial statutory

- Louis Riel Day – third Monday in February
- Victoria Day – last Monday preceding May 25
- Thanksgiving – second Monday in October

Optional

- Terry Fox Day (Civic Holiday) – first Monday in August
- Remembrance Day – an "official day of observance"

=== New Brunswick ===
Five nationwide and five provincial statutory holidays. Although prescribed as public holidays, Victoria Day, Thanksgiving, and Boxing Day are not paid public holidays.

Provincial statutory

- Family Day – third Monday in February (since 2018)
- New Brunswick Day – first Monday in August
- Remembrance Day – November 11

Optional

- Victoria Day
- Thanksgiving
- Boxing Day

=== Newfoundland and Labrador ===
Five nationwide and one provincial statutory holiday. Thanksgiving is not a statutory holiday. Canada Day is not a statutory holiday as July 1 is Memorial Day.

Provincial statutory

- Memorial Day – July 1
- Armistice Day (Remembrance Day) – November 11

Optional

The following is a list of designated paid holidays for government employees.

- Saint Patrick's Day – March 17
- Saint George's Day – April 23
- Victoria Day – Monday preceding May 25
- June Holiday – temporary name, formerly known as Discovery Day until 2020; Monday closest to June 24
- Orangemen's Day – Monday closest to July 12
- National Day for Truth and Reconciliation – September 30
- Thanksgiving – second Monday in October
- Boxing Day – December 26
- One additional day in each year that, in the opinion of the permanent head, is recognized to be a civic holiday in the area in which the employee is employed. If no civic holiday is provided, the employee shall be granted an additional day at a time to be determined by the permanent head.

These have not been observed as statutory holidays since 1992. They are, however, observed by the provincial government. Unlike most other provinces, there is no province-wide holiday on the first Monday in August. It may be seen as redundant due to the Royal St. John's Regatta, which is observed as a civic holiday in St. John's on the first Wednesday in August (or, in case of poor weather, the next suitable day thereafter). Harbour Grace and Labrador City have a similar holiday for their regatta in late July. All other municipalities are entitled to designate one day a year as a civic holiday; however, many do not take advantage of this.

=== Northwest Territories ===
Five nationwide holidays and eight territorial statutory holidays.

Territorial statutory

- Easter Monday – Monday following Easter
- Victoria Day – Monday preceding May 25
- National Indigenous Peoples Day – June 21
- Civic Holiday – first Monday in August
- National Day of Truth and Reconciliation – September 30
- Thanksgiving – second Monday of October
- Remembrance Day – November 11
- Boxing Day – December 26

=== Nova Scotia ===
Five nationwide holidays plus two provincial holidays. Victoria Day, Thanksgiving, and Boxing Day are not statutory holidays but most businesses and retail are closed Boxing Day. Most statutory holidays can be substituted for a mutually agreeable alternative paid day off in lieu or employers can require employees to work at a premium rate of pay. Several types of employment, including workplaces covered by a collective agreement, are exempt from provincial rules governing statutory holidays.

Provincial statutory

- Heritage Day – This holiday is held on the third Monday of February since 2015, and celebrates notable people, events and locations from the province's history. In 2015, Heritage Day celebrated Black Nova Scotian civil rights activist and businesswoman Viola Desmond.
- Remembrance Day – November 11; this holiday has been governed separately from all other public holidays in Nova Scotia since 1981: it is illegal for any person to offer any goods or real property for sale on this date, or to accept or offer employment in exchange for gain or reward. There are special exemptions for workers who are employed in certain categories but an alternative day off with pay must be offered in lieu.

Optional

- Natal Day – first Monday in August; not a statutory holiday but a common day off in Halifax Regional Municipality.

=== Nunavut ===
Five nationwide and six territorial statutory holidays.

Territorial statutory

- Victoria Day – Monday preceding May 25
- Nunavut Day – July 9
- Civic Holiday – first Monday in August
- Truth and Reconciliation – September 30
- Thanksgiving – second Monday in October
- Remembrance Day – November 11

=== Ontario ===
Five nationwide and four provincial statutory holidays. Martin Luther King Jr. Day was officially recognized in Toronto in 2018 and has also been in Ottawa, though not as a paid holiday.

Provincial statutory

- Family Day – third Monday in February
- Victoria Day – Monday preceding May 25
- Thanksgiving Day – second Monday of October
- Boxing Day – December 26

Optional

- Civic Holiday – first Monday in August
- Remembrance Day – November 11

=== Prince Edward Island ===
Five nationwide and three provincial statutory holidays.

Provincial statutory

- Islander Day – third Monday in February (originally second)
- Truth and Reconciliation Day – September 30
- Remembrance Day – November 11

Optional

- Gold Cup Parade Day – third Friday in August. Celebrated in the capital city of Charlottetown marking the end of the Provincial Exhibition and the Gold Cup and Saucer race at the Charlottetown Driving Park. The day is observed as a holiday by some businesses in the central and eastern areas of the province.

=== Quebec ===
In Quebec, there are five nationwide and three provincial statutory holidays. Remembrance Day and Boxing Day are not statutory holidays, and there is no civic holiday in August. Many details of employment law are different in Quebec. The official statutory holidays are:

- January 1 (New Year's Day)
- Good Friday or Easter Monday at the employer's choice
- Monday preceding May 25 (National Patriots' Day)
- June 24 (Saint-Jean-Baptiste Day)
- July 1. If this date falls on a Sunday: July 2 (Canada Day)
- First Monday in September (Labour Day)
- Second Monday in October (Thanksgiving Day)
- December 25 (Christmas Day).

Optional

- Construction Holiday (French: Vacances de la construction) takes place during the last two weeks of July and also the last two weeks of December for Christmas holidays. While it applies officially only to the construction industry, many other Quebecers arrange to take their vacations during these two weeks.

=== Saskatchewan ===
Five nationwide and five provincial statutory holidays.

Provincial statutory

- Family Day – third Monday in February
- Victoria Day – Monday preceding May 25
- Saskatchewan Day – first Monday in August. Celebration of Saskatchewan history and culture similar to Canada Day.
- Thanksgiving Day – second Monday in October
- Remembrance Day – November 11

=== Yukon ===
Five nationwide and four territorial statutory holidays. In addition, Easter Monday, Boxing Day, and Heritage Day are statutory for public service workers. Many employers give their employees days off that may not be statutory holidays in the particular province, particularly Boxing Day.

Territorial statutory

- Victoria Day – Monday preceding May 25
- Discovery Day – third Monday in August
- Thanksgiving Day – second Monday in October
- Remembrance Day – November 11
- National Aboriginal Day – June 21; since 2017

Optional

The following days are not Yukon statutory holidays:

- Heritage Day – Friday preceding the last Sunday in February; optional for non-public service workers.
- Easter Monday
- Boxing Day – December 26

=== Municipal holidays ===
Some municipalities also have local statutory holidays. For instance, the morning of the Stampede Parade is often given as a half-day holiday in the city of Calgary. In Ontario, the August Civic Holiday is not defined provincially, but by each municipality.

== Civic holidays ==
Civic Holiday (French: congé civique) is a public holiday in Canada celebrated on the first Monday in August.

Though the first Monday of August is celebrated in most of Canada as a public holiday, it is only officially known as "Civic Holiday" in Nunavut and the Northwest Territories, where it is a territorial statutory holiday.

In other provinces and municipalities, the holiday is known by a variety of names, including British Columbia Day in British Columbia, New Brunswick Day in New Brunswick, and Saskatchewan Day in Saskatchewan; all of these places celebrate the date as a provincial statutory holiday.

The holiday is celebrated as Heritage Day in Alberta; Natal Day in Nova Scotia, in commemoration of the founding of the Halifax–Dartmouth area; Natal Day on Prince Edward Island celebrating the birth of the province; and as Terry Fox Day in Manitoba, in honour of the Manitoba-born athlete.

The date is also celebrated as several municipal holidays in Ontario, such as Simcoe Day in Toronto, John Galt Day in Guelph, and Colonel By Day in Ottawa.

Despite its special designations, the day is not a statutory holiday in Nova Scotia, Manitoba, Alberta, or Ontario; however, it is commonly observed by all levels of government, financial institutions and some businesses.

The word civic is in reference to municipalities (such as cities, towns, etc.), as this day is not legislatively mandated a public holiday across the country by the Canadian federal government and is often given a different, more specific name by some municipalities or provinces.

== Proposed holidays ==
The other leading candidate for a new holiday is a weekend in February to celebrate the anniversary of the Canadian flag, or more likely a general "Heritage Day". February 15 is already designated as Flag Day, but this is simply a day of commemoration, not a statutory holiday.

In April 2014, a private member's bill to make Remembrance Day a legal holiday and give it the same status as Canada Day was introduced to the House of Commons. Bill C-597 passed second reading in the House of Commons by a margin of 258 to 2; however, it did not become law.

In 2001, members of the 14th Legislative Assembly of the Northwest Territories passed the National Aboriginal Day Act, making it the first jurisdiction in Canada to recognize this day as a formal statutory holiday.

== Holidays occurring on non-work days ==
For federally regulated workers, if a holiday occurs on a day that is normally not worked, then "another day off with pay will be provided".

When New Year's Day, Canada Day, Remembrance Day, Christmas Day or Boxing Day falls on a Saturday or Sunday which a federally regulated worker would not normally work, they are entitled to a holiday with pay on the working day immediately before or after the holiday. If one of the other holidays falls on a weekend, then the employer must add a holiday with pay to their employees’ annual vacation or give them a paid day off at another mutually convenient time.

== Other observances ==
- Groundhog Day, February 2
- Valentine's Day, February 14
- National Flag of Canada Day, February 15
- International Women's Day, March 8
- Commonwealth Day, the second Monday in March. This has been observed as a holiday in some Commonwealth countries.
- Saint Patrick's Day, March 17
- April Fool's Day, April 1
- Tartan Day, April 6
- Earth Day, April 22
- Red Dress Day, May 5
- Victory in Europe Day, May 8
- Mother's Day, second Sunday of May
- Father's Day, third Sunday of June
- Loyalist Day, June 19, celebrating Canada's Loyalist heritage, particularly in Ontario and New Brunswick (also the day Upper Canada was created, now Ontario)
- National Indigenous Peoples Day, June 21 as part of the Celebrate Canada series
- Canadian Multiculturalism Day, June 27 as part of the Celebrate Canada series
- National Peacekeepers' Day, August 9 observed on the closest Sunday
- National Grandparents' Day, second Sunday in September
- National Family Week, week preceding Thanksgiving
- Halloween, October 31
- National Day of Remembrance and Action on Violence Against Women, December 6

== See also ==
- Canadian folklore
- Canadian identity
- Canadian values
- Cottage country
- List of festivals in Canada
- List of holidays by country
