= May long weekend =

May long weekend may refer to:

== Canada ==
- Victoria Day, the second to last Monday in May and its preceding Saturday and Sunday, a three-day weekend for most residents

== United States ==
- Memorial Day, the last Monday in May and its preceding Saturday and Sunday, a three-day weekend for most residents
