= Civic Holiday =

Annual public holiday in Canada

- Official name: Civic Holiday (federal, NU, NT, ON); British Columbia Day (BC); Heritage Day (AB); New Brunswick Day (NB); Saskatchewan Day (SK); Natal Day (NS); Terry Fox Day (MB)
- Observed by: Canada (most jurisdictions)
- Type: Public
- Date: First Monday in August
- 2025 date: August 4
- 2026 date: August 3
- 2027 date: August 2
- 2028 date: August 7
- Frequency: Annual

Civic Holiday (French: congé civique) is a public holiday in Canada celebrated on the first Monday in August.

Though the first Monday of August is celebrated in most of Canada as a public holiday, it is only officially known as "Civic Holiday" in Nunavut and the Northwest Territories, where it is a territorial statutory holiday.

In other provinces and municipalities, the holiday is known by a variety of names, including British Columbia Day in British Columbia, New Brunswick Day in New Brunswick, and Saskatchewan Day in Saskatchewan; all of these places celebrate the date as a provincial statutory holiday.

The holiday is celebrated as Heritage Day in Alberta; Natal Day in Nova Scotia, in commemoration of the founding of the Halifax–Dartmouth area; Natal Day on Prince Edward Island celebrating the birth of the province; and as Terry Fox Day in Manitoba, in honour of the Manitoba-born athlete.

The date is also celebrated as several municipal holidays in Ontario, such as Simcoe Day in Toronto, John Galt Day in Guelph, and Colonel By Day in Ottawa.

Despite its special designations, the day is not a statutory holiday in Nova Scotia, Manitoba, Alberta, or Ontario; however, it is commonly observed by all levels of government, financial institutions and some businesses.

The word civic is in reference to municipalities (such as cities, towns, etc.), as this day is not legislatively mandated a public holiday across the country by the Canadian federal government and is often given a different, more specific name by some municipalities or provinces.

== Alberta ==
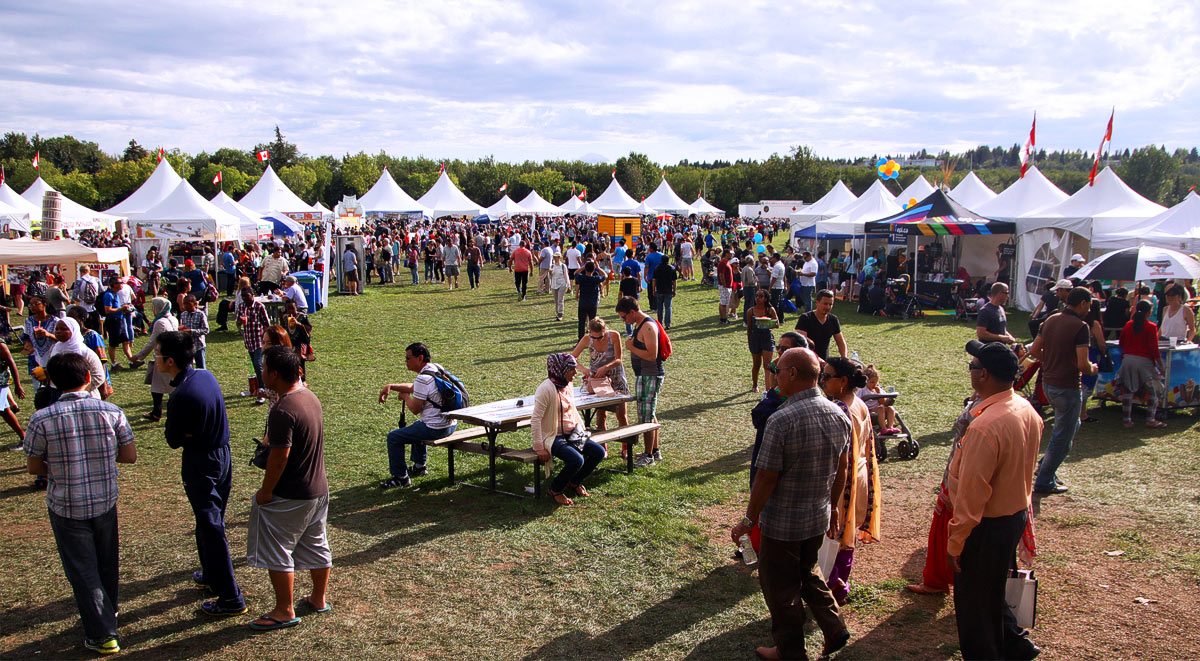
Celebration of Heritage Day at the Edmonton Heritage Festival in 2015

In 1974, the Government of Alberta, acting through Minister of Culture Horst A. Schmid, declared the first Monday in August an annual holiday to recognize and celebrate the varied cultural heritage of Albertans, known as "Heritage Day". This gave rise in 1976 to the Edmonton Heritage Festival, a three-day celebration of food, dance, and handicrafts of cultures from around the world. Heritage Day was officially abolished in 1990 and replaced with Family Day, observed in February, but is still widely recognized and celebrated.

== British Columbia ==
In February 1970, member of the Legislative Assembly (MLA) Agnes Kripps called for the creation of a new provincial holiday but failed to get anything passed before the 1972 election despite support from Premier W. A. C. Bennett.

In 1974, Surrey MLA Ernie Hall, part of the BC NDP government of Dave Barrett, introduced legislation in the provincial legislature to establish the day as a provincial statutory holiday.

As the name suggests, British Columbia Day, commonly referred to as BC Day, celebrates the history, heritage, and culture of British Columbia.

== Manitoba ==
In Manitoba, the first Monday in August is celebrated as "Terry Fox Day" in honour of athlete and cancer research activist Terry Fox, who was born in Winnipeg in 1958.

The province marked the first Terry Fox Day on 3 August 2015, making Manitoba the first province to name a day in Fox's honour. British Columbia and Ontario have since begun to celebrate "Terry Fox Day" on the second Sunday of September, as that is usually the national date for the Terry Fox Run.

== New Brunswick ==
In New Brunswick, the first Monday in August is celebrated as "New Brunswick Day".

It was first proposed in October 1974 by Progressive Conservative premier Richard Hatfield as part of his party's re-election platform. It was first observed on Monday, 4 August 1975.

== Nova Scotia ==
In Nova Scotia, the first Monday in August is celebrated as "Natal Day" in the Halifax–Dartmouth area and Annapolis Royal, which began in 1895 as a celebration of the province's history. In the late 1900s, the rest of the province became entitled to celebrate a civic holiday, which falls on the same day as Natal Day. It is not a statutory holiday.

Dartmouth Natal Day Road Race, one of the longest running road races in North America, is part of the Natal Day festivities in the Halifax Regional Municipality.

== Ontario ==
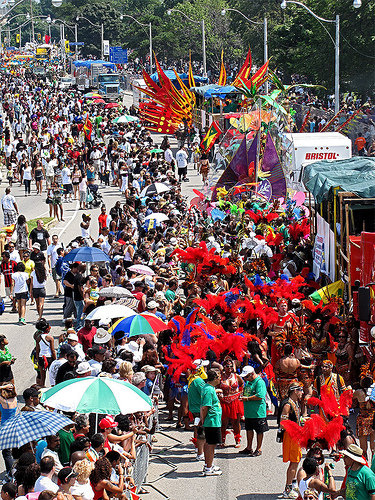
Caribana festivities in Toronto include the Parade of Bands on the civic holiday.

In Ontario, the first Monday of August is technically a municipal holiday, as it is not designated as an official statutory holiday by provincial legislation. Various private member's bills have been introduced in the Ontario Legislature attempting to make it official, but none have passed to date.

As such, the holiday takes on different names and celebrates different subjects according to municipality. Many Ontario municipalities have chosen to honour a significant local person or organization in order to localize the celebration; when not given a local name (such as in Mississauga), the day is often generically referred to as "Civic Holiday" or "August Civic Holiday".

In 2008, the Ontario Legislature passed a law identifying the first of August as "Emancipation Day", as the British Parliament abolished slavery in the British Empire as of 1 August 1834. This still did not make it an official holiday, however. The Toronto Caribbean Carnival, formerly known as Caribana, is held the same weekend in Toronto.

The Civic Holiday is now known by one of a number of local appellations, including, among others:

- "Founders' Day" in Brantford (named in 1982): each year, the Brantford Heritage Committee submits a report to City Council with the name or organization that is to be recognized on that day.
- "Joseph Brant Day" in Burlington: celebrating Joseph Brant, the Mohawk chief who became known for his treaty negotiations and loyalty to the British.
- "James Cockburn Day" in Cobourg (1999): celebrating James Cockburn, one of the "fathers of Confederation".
- "John Galt Day" in Guelph (2006): celebrating John Galt, the Scottish novelist and businessman who founded the city.
- "George Hamilton Day" in Hamilton: celebrating George Hamilton, the eponymous founder of the city.
- "McLaughlin Day" in Oshawa (1983): celebrating Robert McLaughlin, who brought General Motors to Oshawa.
- "Colonel By Day" in Ottawa (1996): celebrating Colonel John By, who led the construction of the Rideau Canal and founded Bytown, which became the city of Ottawa.
- "Peter Robinson Day" in Peterborough: celebrating Peter Robinson.
- "Alexander Mackenzie Day" in Sarnia (1998): celebrating Alexander Mackenzie, the 2nd Prime Minister of Canada
- "Simcoe Day" in Toronto: celebrating John Graves Simcoe, the first lieutenant-governor of Upper Canada and the leading proponent of the Act Against Slavery.
- "Benjamin Vaughan Day" in Vaughan: celebrating the eponymous Benjamin Vaughan

Although a work holiday is given to employees of the federal, provincial, and many municipal governments (usually by inclusion in the contract with the employees' union), the Government of Ontario has not defined this day as a statutory holiday that all employers must treat as a holiday, and it is not mentioned in Ontario's Employment Standards Act nor the Retail Business Holidays Act.

Schools are generally already closed, regardless of the holiday's status, because of summer vacation.

=== Simcoe Day ===
In 1869, the city of Toronto became the first to introduce the civic holiday when the Toronto City Council called for a midsummer holiday for a "day of recreation". In 1875, the City Council fixed the first Monday in August as a Civic Holiday.

The holiday was renamed "Simcoe Day" in 1969 in honour of John Graves Simcoe, the first lieutenant-governor of Upper Canada, who established York (now Toronto) as the capital of Ontario, and who was the leading proponent of the Act Against Slavery. However, a motion at the Ontario Municipal Association to extend the name change across Ontario failed. According to proclamations from the city, this name continues to apply in Toronto.

== Prince Edward Island ==
The holiday is not an official holiday, although some businesses may close for the day. Additionally, federal workers receive the day off and federal services are closed, but municipal and provincial services and workers have varying decisions made on their status, with some choosing to have a day off in celebration of the Gold Cup Parade instead. This leads to a mix of openings and closings across the province. The capital city of Charlottetown has its own Natal Day, in early June, not to be confused with Nova Scotia's Natal Day.

== Saskatchewan ==
An official holiday on the first Monday in August was first proposed in Saskatchewan on 17 March 1975, by Gordon Snyder, Saskatchewan's Minister of Labour. The holiday was already celebrated by businesses across Saskatchewan, but Snyder wanted it to be a recognized statutory holiday known as "Saskatchewan Day". His proposal was approved in June of that year and the first Saskatchewan Day was celebrated that August.

The first Monday of August in Saskatchewan is therefore a statutory holiday as designated in the Labour Standards Act.

== Non-observing jurisdictions ==
The first Monday in August is not generally observed as a holiday in Quebec, parts of Newfoundland and Labrador, or Yukon, but replacement summer holidays may be observed as follows:

- Quebec observes Saint-Jean-Baptiste Day on 24 June.
- In Yukon, Discovery Day is observed on the third Monday of August instead; it commemorates the 1896 discovery of gold in the territory and the start of the Klondike Gold Rush.
- In Newfoundland and Labrador, the Shops Closing Act provides for a civic holiday on the date of the Royal St. John's Regatta (usually the first Wednesday of August) in St. John's, the date of the Harbour Grace Regatta (usually the fourth Saturday in July) in Harbour Grace, and a date fixed by the applicable municipal council in all other municipalities. Several of these communities use the first Monday in August as a civic holiday; Corner Brook uses the third Monday in February (celebrated in most other provinces as Family Day), while others have not selected any date.
  - Due to the cancellation of the Royal St. John's Regatta in 2020 during the COVID-19 pandemic, the city made a one-time exception, with provincial approval, setting the first Monday of August that year as the civic holiday instead, in alignment with the other observing jurisdictions.

== See also ==
- Public holidays in Canada
