= National Patriots' Day =

Canadian public holiday

National Patriots' Day Journée nationale des Patriotes
- The green, white and red tricolour used by the Parti patriote between 1832 and 1838.
- Official name: Journée nationale des Patriotes
- Also called: Fête des patriotes (Patriots' Holiday)
- Observed by: Quebeckers
- Type: Historical, secular, patriotic
- Celebrations: marches, music concerts, banquets, fireworks, public speeches, awards ceremonies
- Ends: TR
- Date: Monday before 25th of May
- 2025 date: May 19, 2025
- 2026 date: May 18, 2026
- 2027 date: May 24, 2027
- 2028 date: May 22, 2028
- Frequency: annual

National Patriots' Day (French: Journée nationale des Patriotes) is a statutory holiday observed annually in the Canadian province of Quebec, on the Monday preceding 25 May. The holiday was established by the Lieutenant Governor of Quebec-in-Council in 2003, according to the Parti Quebecois premier Bernard Landry: "to underline the importance of the struggle of the patriots of 1837–1838 for the national recognition of our people, for its political liberty and to obtain a democratic system of government." Before 2003, the Monday preceding 25 May of each year was unofficially the Fête de Dollard, a commemoration initiated in the 1920s to coincide with Victoria Day, a federal holiday occurring annually on the same date.

== History ==
The citizens of Saint-Denis-sur-Richelieu organized, in 1937, the Fêtes du centenaire de 1837, in order to commemorate the "struggles of the Patriotes of 1837–1838 for liberty, the national recognition of our people and for democracy." The festivities took place at various sites across the municipality, and some residents produced souvenirs of the event.

Beginning in 1962, on the 125th anniversary of the 1837 Rebellions, a public gathering in Saint-Denis-sur-Richelieu to mark the rebellion became an annual event. On 6 October 1982, the so-called Patriots' Day was declared by the Quebec Governor-in-Council as occurring each year on the Sunday closest to 23 November. The desire to see the Journée des patriotes gained a more official character and incited some citizens to campaign for the celebration to be declared a statutory holiday, either as a new holiday or in replacement of an existing one. In 1987, the Club Souverain de l'Estrie started the movement "For a paid holiday in memory of the Patriots," while other organizations, such as the Saint-Jean-Baptiste Society of Montreal and the Comité du 15 février 1839 (founded by Pierre Falardeau in 1997 to help finance the movie February 15, 1839 (15 février 1839)), later joined in the campaign.

During the provincial congress of the nationalist Parti Québécois (May 5–7, 2000), party members adopted a resolution inviting the government to replace the traditional holiday with a nationalist one.

On 21 November 2001, provincial premier Bernard Landry proposed a motion in the National Assembly of Quebec inviting that body to "underline the importance of the struggle of the Patriots of 1837–1838." An Order in Council was then issued on 20 November the following year, establishing the Journée des patriotes—thenceforth known as National Patriots' Day—as the Monday preceding 25 May, thereby replacing the Fête de Dollard. The moving from November to May was motivated by the will to highlight the starting point of the numerous public meetings organized by citizens throughout Lower Canada from May to November 1837 in reaction to the passing of British Home Secretary Lord John Russell's Ten Resolutions by the House of Commons.

The first official replacement holiday took place on 19 May 2003.

== See also ==
- History of Quebec
- Patriote movement
- Quebec nationalism
- Quebec independence movement
