= Adam Dollard des Ormeaux =

French colonial soldier in Quebec mythologized as a colonial hero

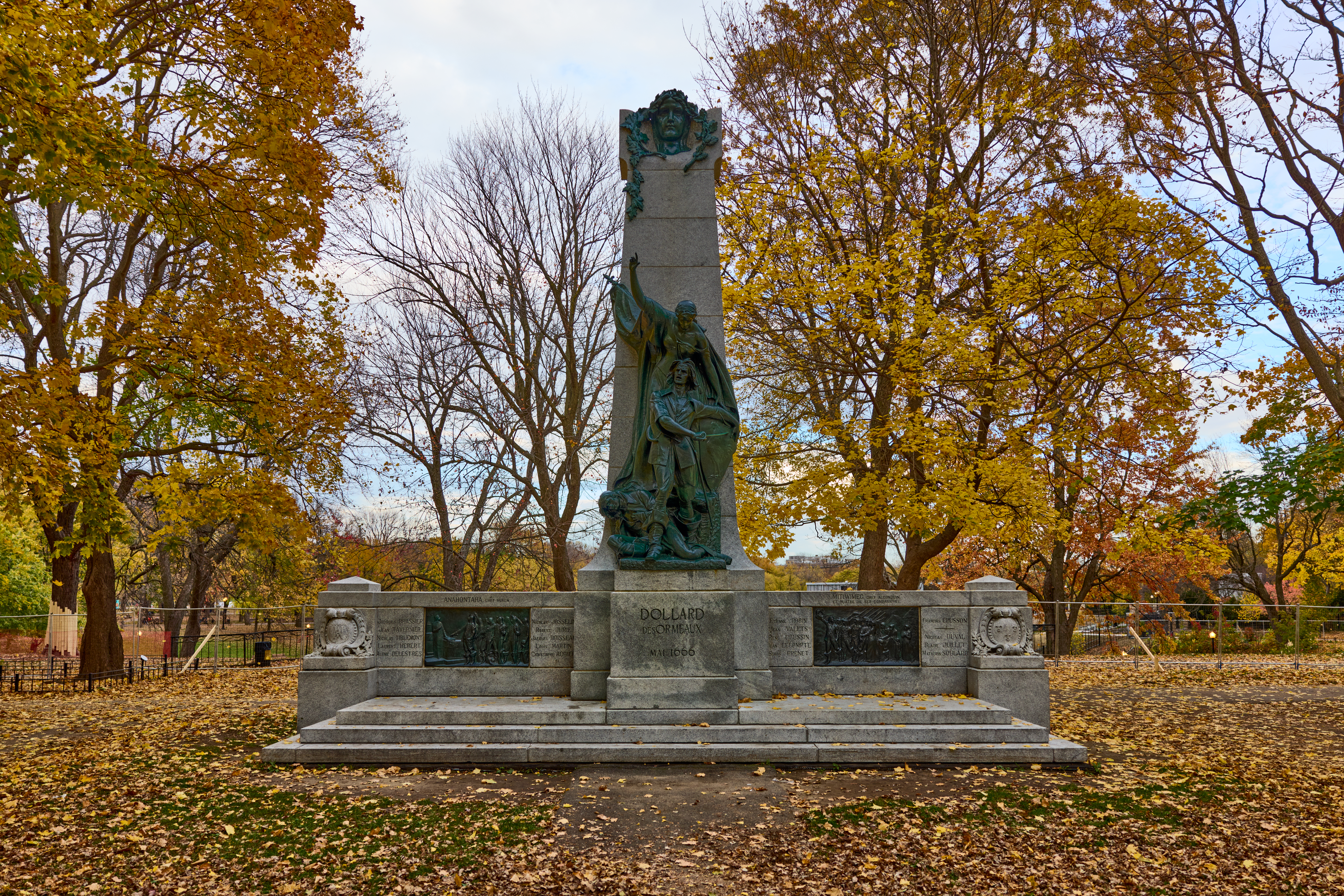
- Alfred Laliberté's Adam Dollard des Ormeaux in La Fontaine Park, Montreal
- Born: July 23, 1635; Ormeaux, Brie, France
- Died: May 21, 1660 (aged 24); Carillon, New France
- Known for: Battle of Long Sault

Adam Dollard des Ormeaux (July 23, 1635 – May 21, 1660) is an iconic figure in the history of New France (modern-day Quebec). Arriving in the colony in 1658, Dollard was appointed the position of garrison commander of Fort Ville-Marie (now Montreal). In the spring of 1660, Dollard led an expedition up the Ottawa River to wage war on the Haudenosaunee. Accompanied by seventeen other Frenchmen, Dollard arrived at the foot of Long Sault (near present-day Carillon, Quebec) on May 1 and settled his troops at an abandoned Algonquin fort. He was then joined by forty Wendat (Huron) and four Algonquin allies. Vastly outnumbered by the Haudenosaunee, Dollard and his companions died at the Battle of Long Sault somewhere between May 9 and May 12. The exact nature or purpose of Dollard's 1660 expedition is uncertain; however, most historians agree that Dollard set out to conduct a "petite guerre" (ambush) against the Haudenosaunee, in order to delay (or prevent altogether) their imminent attack on Ville-Marie. For these reasons, Dollard is regarded as one of the saviours of New France.

== Dollard in New France ==
Dollard was born in Lumigny-Nesles-Ormeaux, France in 1635. At the age of 24, he settled in Montreal and took up a career in the military. Aside from some military experience, nothing is known of his activities prior to his arrival in Canada. In Ville-Marie, Dollard had attained a rather positive reputation. In Histoire de Montréal, François Dollier de Casson portrays Dollard as "a youth of courage and of good family" and in the Jesuit Relations, Dollard is described as a "man of accomplishment and generalship". Most importantly, Dollard had gained the trust of Paul de Chomedey, Sieur de Maisonneuve, who authorized Dollard's expedition to Long Sault river.

There is little verifiable evidence regarding Dollard's reason for being in Canada, but it is possible he was contemplating life as a settler in the colony. Tellingly, by the end of 1659, Maisonneuve gave him a piece of land comprising 30 arpents (10 hectares). Upon Dollard's death, Pierre Picoté de Belestre inherited his land.

== Expedition west and the Battle of Long Sault ==
Engraving depicting Adam Dollard with a keg of gunpowder above his head, during the Battle of Long Sault.

Against the advice of seasoned Aboriginal fighters, Dollard got the support of the governor of Montreal, Paul Chomedey de Maisonneuve, to organize an expedition west. The group comprised about 16 volunteers who had little or no experience in Aboriginal warfare. After a 10-day canoe trip up the Ottawa River, they set up camp not far from Carillon, Quebec, in a former stockade. They were soon surrounded by about 700 Haudenosaunee and after a siege lasting several days, they were all killed or captured in what became known as the Battle of Long Sault. For reasons unknown, the Haudenosaunee did not continue east to capture Ville-Marie. The events were witnessed by about 40 Wendat allies who at times had joined the colonists in the stockade and at other times had harried the Haudenosaunee from outside. According to some scholars, the battle so weakened the Haudenosaunee they cancelled their planned attack on Ville-Marie (Montreal) and returned home. For over a century Dollard des Ormeaux became a heroic figure in New France, and Quebec, as he exemplified selfless personal sacrifice, as well as martyrdom for the church, and for the colony. Agreements on the validity of this interpretation are debatable.

The reason why Dollard and his companions attempted to ambush the Haudenosaunee is up for debate. Tradition holds that Dollard was anticipating a Haudenosaunee attack on Ville-Marie (Montreal) and that in response, he amassed the small force of seventeen Frenchmen, four Algonquins, and about forty Wendat to defend the town. They fought to the death and because of this supposedly saved Ville-Marie from a Haudenosaunee invasion. But there are many scholars who claim his reasons were not quite as noble.

According to André Vachon, some historians claim that Dollard was in debt and thereby sought to steal the furs from the Haudenosaunee who were returning from their winter hunt. This theory has been criticized. One such criticism points to the fact that Paul Chomedey de Maisonneuve approved of this expedition, which implies that the goals of the expedition was at the very least partially sanctioned by the colony's civil service or military command. However, a more historical analysis of the context of late 17th century New France is better for establishing a more concrete cause for this mission.

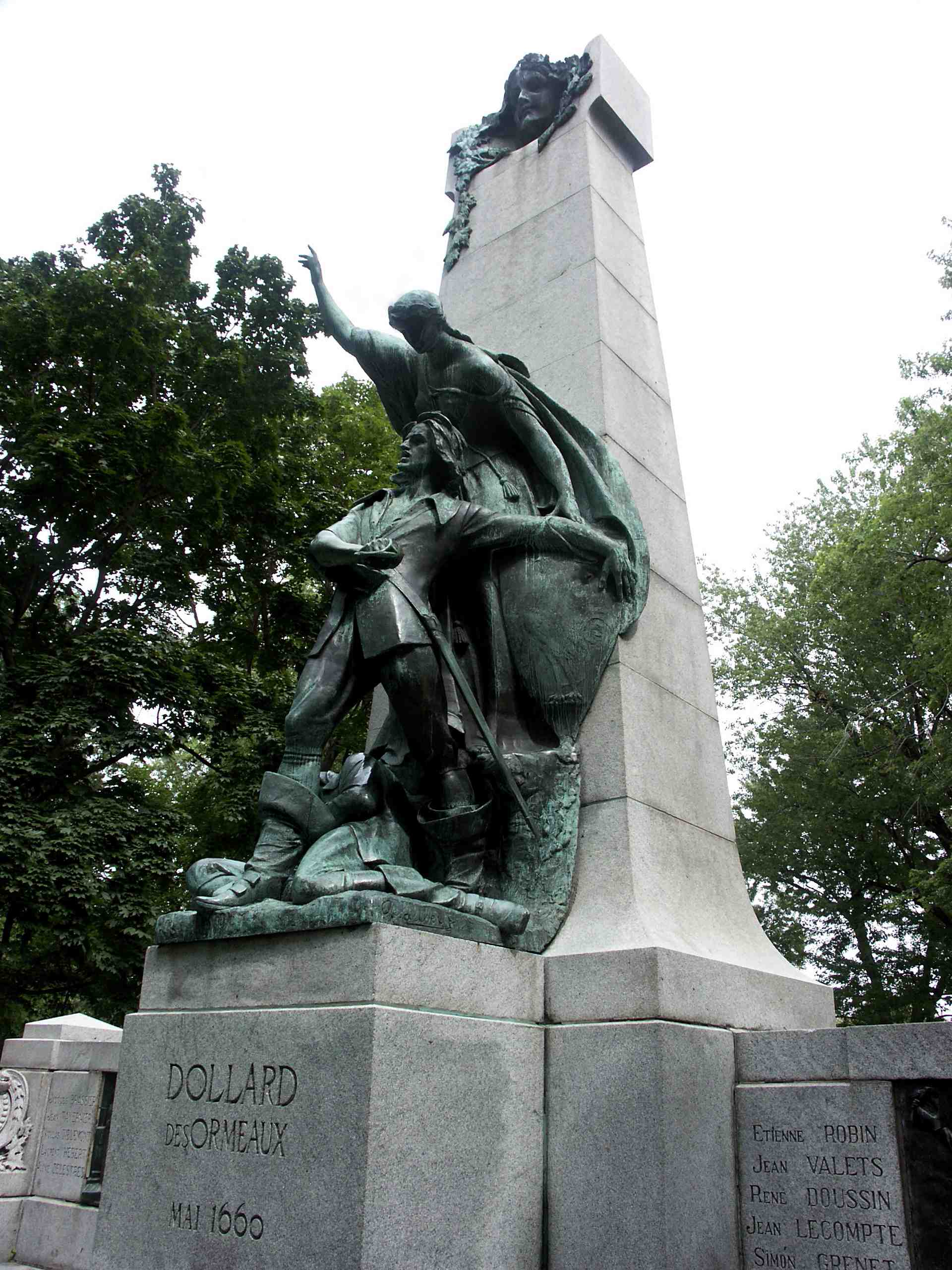
Monument in Parc Lafontaine

Many historians, such as John A. Dickinson, argue that not enough attention has been given to considerations of indigenous culture in this debate. The Haudenosaunee and the Wendat at this time were in conflict with one another. Prior to 1660, the Haudenosaunee wiped out a great many Wendat leaving very few of them in the area around Ville-Marie. Moreover, indigenous warfare, among other things, involves codes of honour. Therefore, as some historians argue, the forty Wendat who went up the Ottawa River to intercept the Haudenosaunee did so to fight them because of issues involving honour. Where as the reasons for the Haudenosaunee not to attack Montreal can simply be that the Haudenosaunee did not have any immediate conflict with the French.

The location of the battle is a topic of intense controversy. Traditionally, the battle was fought along the Ottawa River near Carillon, Quebec. This location is based on nationalistic traditions on the part of Quebec historians. Supporters of this location also refer to the countless texts written after the event and for many years after which maintain this tradition. However, other scholars place the event on the southern side of the Ottawa River on what is now the Ross Farm in Ontario. The location being either in Ontario or Quebec has cultural implications. However, both sides of the debate agree that Dollard and his French and Indigenous comrades would have taken the route following the Ottawa River since they sought to intercept the Haudenosaunee coming back from their winter hunt. Similar to the Carillon advocates, the Ross farm advocates, in part, base their conclusions on tradition. Traditions include known battles between French and Haudenosaunee in this area, old French inhabitants of the area placing the battle there, and also from the testimony of a Wendat eyewitness to the battle. Archeological evidence is also referenced by Ross farm advocates. Archeological excavations of palisades (in which Dollard and his comrades fought in) and considerations of topography coincide with the testimonies of the Wendat survivors along with other oral and written traditions.

== Cultural legacy ==
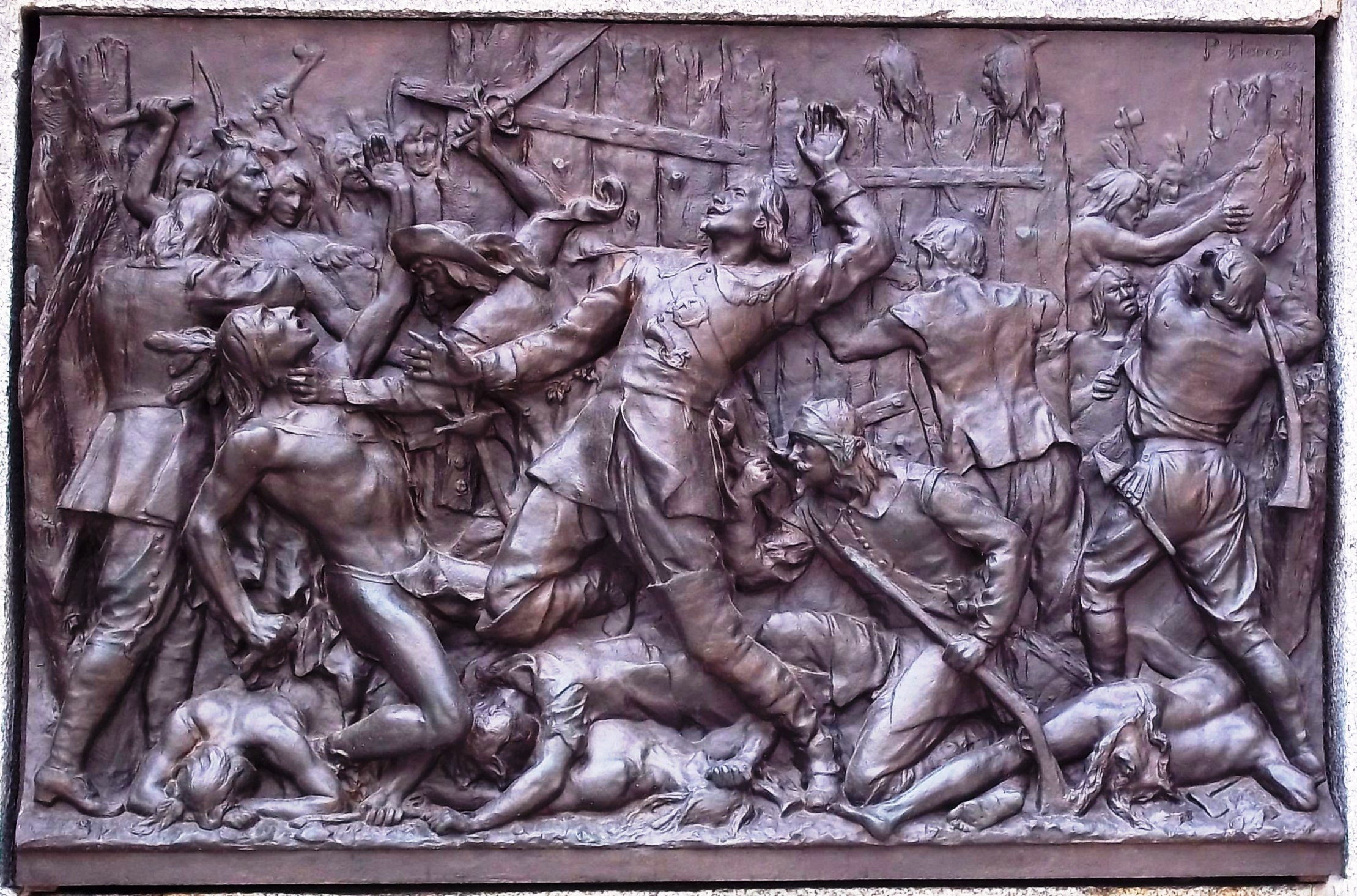
Maisonneuve Monument: Dollard des Ormeaux in the Battle of Long Sault

=== Representations of Dollard as a cultural figure in French Canadian history ===
The first sources written concerning the Battle of Long Sault are a series of letters composed by Marie Guyart, founder of the Ursuline institute of New France, and a collection of compiled documents from various Jesuit missionaries entitled Relations. These sources, written immediately after Dollard's death in 1660, give descriptive accounts of the battle and emphasize the perceived dualism between Christianity and the barbarism of the Natives. Although he is singled out as the leader in these earliest recorded stories, Dollard des Ormeaux is not the main focus of the battle.

In 1672, François Dollier de Casson wrote Histoire de Montréal. His book included a chapter dedicated solely to Dollard des Ormeaux and the Battle of Long Sault. This work marked a shift in Dollard's personal role in the battle. In Dollier's account, Dollard becomes a central heroic figure. He is characterized by an air of mystery and strong leadership abilities. He also occupies a more active role in the proceedings. Similar to Guyart's account, Dollard is aligned with Christianity in opposition to the barbarism of the Natives.

These accounts of Dollard provided a basis that allowed him to develop into and be upheld as a heroic figure in French-Canadian culture, post-British conquest. These sources also set a precedent of anti-Native American sentiment surrounding the veneration of Dollard.

With the exception of a brief mention in the work of Charlevoix in the 1700s, Dollard and the Battle of Long Sault does not reappear in French Canadian writing until the 1840s. The re-emergence of the tale coincides with the union of Upper and Lower Canada and the ensuing fear that French Canadians would lose control over their rights. The story of Dollard was used by authors in this period, such as François-Xavier Garneau, to secure a space for the French in the national history of Canada. Garneau's text emphasizes the loyalty of Dollard and his soldiers to their nation and the unity of their action.

The rise of industrialization and ultramontanism in the 1860s marked another shift in the story of Dollard. The Catholic Church had become an influential representative of French Canadian interests within the country. To provide ideal moral models, the Catholic clergy wrote versions of history with an emphasis on Christian heroes. In 1865, Étienne-Michel Faillon published L'Histoire de la colonie française au Canada which included an account of the Battle of Long Sault. Faillon's writing places heavy emphasis on the duality between Christianity and barbarity. The language used by Faillon is aggrandizing and glorifies Dollard and his soldiers far more than previous accounts. Dollard, in Faillon's account, becomes an ideal model of Christian morality. Faillon's text became the canon of the Dollard story in French Canadian culture. This attitude was perpetuated throughout the early 1900s. The writing of Lionel Groulx, for instance, portrays Dollard as a figure of French Canadian nationalism and Catholicism. Groulx's writing, in particular, emphasizes the youth of Dollard and upholds him as a model for French Canadian children.

Since controversy has come to light surrounding the circumstances of the Battle of Long Sault, modern historians have challenged traditional visions of Dollard as a hero in Quebec culture. Notable historians on this subject include E. R. Adair and Gustave Lanctot.

=== English history ===
Dollard not only occupies a prominent position in French Canadian culture but also appears as a figure in English Canadian history.

In the 1860s, US historian Francis Parkman wrote an English account of the Battle of Long Sault. His version focuses less on Catholicism and instead uses the story as a model of continuity of European settlements in the Canadas.

=== The arts ===
There have been tributes to Dollard des Ormeaux in Canadian poetry, theatre, and literature. As a response to French marginalization throughout Canada, a lot of this work generally focuses on themes of heroism and the strength of French Canadian ancestors. The art also often explores Dollard's martyrdom for the growth of a nation. Natives are largely absent in these bodies of work and when represented, often depicted as negative figures.

=== Public statues ===
- A monument to Dollard des Ormeaux, created by sculptor Alfred Laliberté and the architect Alphonse Venne, was inaugurated in Parc Lafontaine on June 24, 1920.
- A bas-relief on the Maisonneuve Monument at Place d'Armes, Montreal, sculpted by Louis-Philippe Hébert, portrays Dollard des Ormeaux in the Battle of Long Sault.

=== Holiday ===
In francophone Quebec, as of the 1920s, Victoria Day was commonly known as the Fête de Dollard. After the Quiet Revolution, for some years in the 1970s it was quasi-officially referred to as the Fête de Dollard et de Chénier. In 2003, provincial legislation officially declared the date to be National Patriots' Day.

=== Toponymy ===
In Quebec, as well as the Montreal suburb Dollard-des-Ormeaux, there are dozens of places, including streets, squares, and parks, which commemorate the name.
