= Battle of Long Sault =

1660 battle during the Beaver Wars

- Part of the Beaver Wars
- Engraving depicting Adam Dollard des Ormeaux with a keg of gunpowder above his head.
Date	Five days in early May 1660
Location	Long Sault, Ottawa River, New France

Belligerents
France; Wendat; Algonquin	Haudenosaunee

Commanders and leaders
(Kingdom of France) Adam Dollard des Ormeaux †; Etienne Annahotaha (fr) †; Mituvemeg †	Unknown

Strength
17 French militia 44 Wendat warriors 1 fort	~700 warriors 1 fort

Casualties and losses
54 killed 1 captured (killed later); 1 fort captured	Very Heavy
- Both the Iroquois and the French used war-canoes during the engagement. Two of the Iroquois canoes were damaged and all of the French canoes were destroyed.; The one French prisoner was later killed after the battle.

The Battle of Long Sault occurred over a five-day period in early May 1660 during the Beaver Wars. It was fought between French colonial militia, with their Wendat (Huron) and Algonquin allies, against the Haudenosaunee Confederacy (Iroquois).

Some historians theorize that the Haudenosaunee called off an intended attack on French settlements because one of their chiefs was killed in this battle, while others claim that the battle provided enough trophies to temper Haudenosaunee aims.

== Background ==
An Haudenosaunee war party encamped along the Ottawa River was preparing to attack Ville-Marie (modern day Montreal), Québec and Trois-Rivières. Adam Dollard des Ormeaux, the 24-year-old commander of the Ville-Marie garrison, requested and received permission from Governor Paul Chomedey de Maisonneuve to launch a preemptive surprise attack on the war party. Dollard's expedition was sixteen volunteer riflemen and four Algonquin warriors, including Chief Mituvemeg; they left Ville-Marie in late-April with several canoes of supplies.

The expedition's journey to the Long Sault rapids on the Ottawa was slow, and they arrived on or around May 1. It reportedly took a week to get past the strong current just off of Montreal island, before entering the Ottawa through the Lake of Two Mountains. The expedition occupied an old Algonquin fort to ambush the Haudenosaunee; they were soon reinforced by 40 Wendat, under chief Etienne Annahotaha (fr.) The fort was made from trees planted in a circle and cut down to the trunks. The expedition added an exterior palisade but preparations were not complete when the Haudenosaunee arrived.

== Battle ==
The Haudenosaunee war party had 200 warriors, including several enslaved Wendat fighting for the Haudenosaunee, and advanced down the Ottawa in canoes. Five warriors in two canoes landed and were ambushed by the French; the French had predicted the Haudenosaunee's likely landing place and set the ambush after spotting the canoes. The Haudenosaunee were driven off with four casualties by French musket fire. Next, the main Haudenosaunee force landed and made an immediate and unsuccessful assault on the fort. The Haudenosaunee invested the fort, which included building their own fort. Dollard refused an Haudenosaunee parley, fearing a ruse; in response, the Haudenosaunee captured the undefended French canoes. The second Haudenosaunee attack used the scrapped French canoes as fuel to burn the French fort's walls; the second assault was repulsed, and among the Haudenosaunee casualties was the Seneca chief.

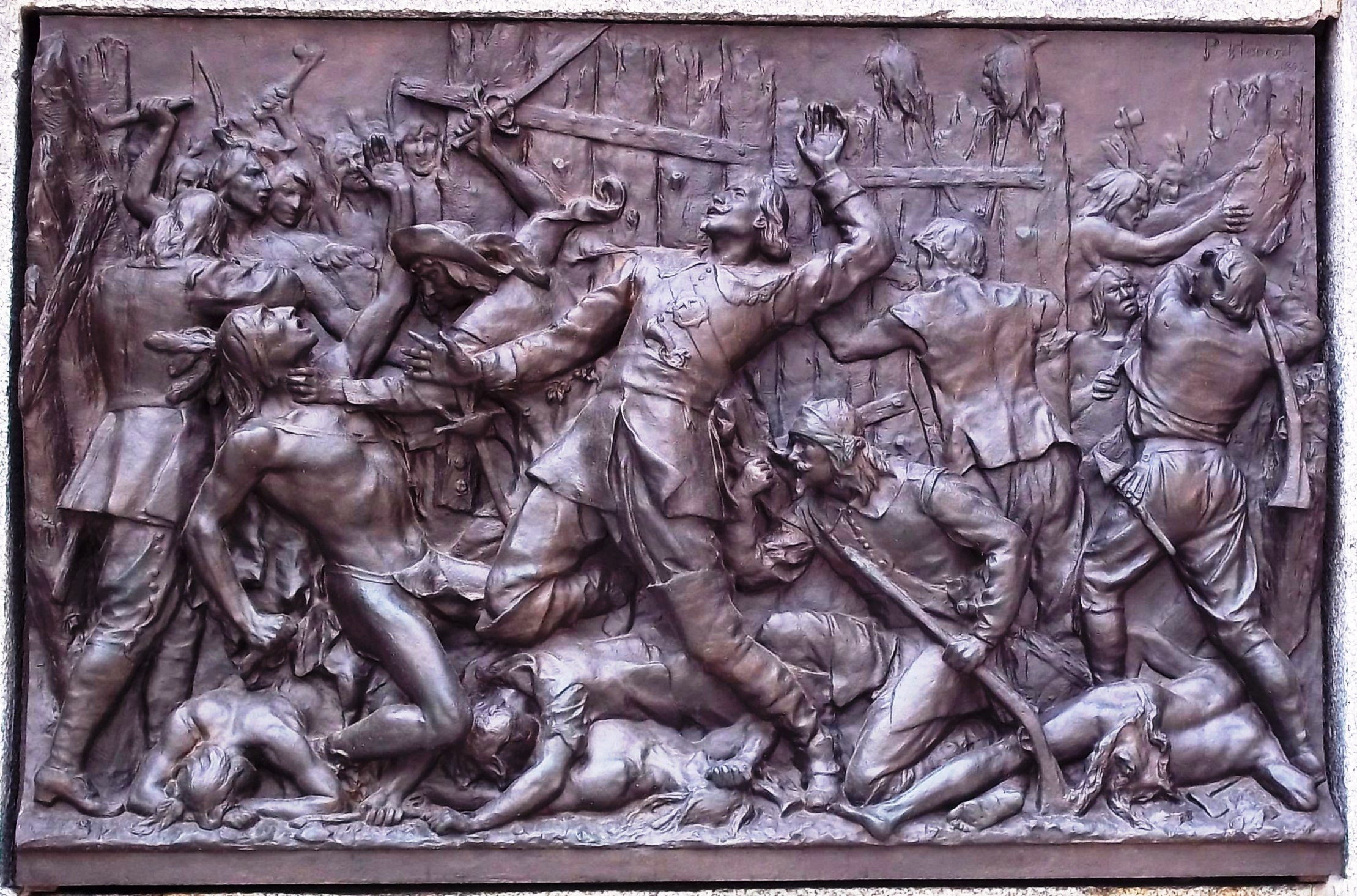
A monument in Montreal featuring an engraving of the battle.

Some of the defenders sortied, cut off the head from the Seneca chief's body, and returned to mount the head on the palisade. A third Haudenosaunee assault also failed. The Haudenosaunee sent a canoe upstream for reinforcements; a second war party with 500 men, originally moving on Ville-Marie, responded. The Wendat slaves shouted promises of fair treatment for any Wendat who abandoned the French; all of the Wendat, except Chief Annahotaha, deserted. The Haudenosaunee killed all but five of the deserters; the survivors later returned to Ville-Marie with news of the French defeat. The second war party arrived on the fifth day of the battle before the fourth assault.

The fourth assault advanced using mantlets, made from three logs attached together, which were effective shields against French musketry. The French food supplies were nearly exhausted. The Haudenosaunee entered the fort through a breach created with knives and axes and by climbing the walls. Dollard threw a keg of burning gunpowder from atop the wall; the bomb struck the palisade and caused many French casualties when it exploded within the fort. Dollard was killed as the Haudenosaunee stormed the fort. There were four French survivors; three were seriously wounded and burned alive in the fort, and the Haudenosaunee later tortured and killed the fourth.

Archibald Lampman's epic poem "At the Long Sault" calls Dollard "Daulac".

== Historiography ==
The deaths of Dollard des Ormeaux and his men were recounted by Catholic nuns and entered into official church history. For over a century, Dollard des Ormeaux became a heroic figure in New France, and then in Quebec, who exemplified selfless personal sacrifice, who had been martyrs for the church, and for the colony. 19th-century historians such as François-Xavier Garneau converted the battle into a religious and nationalistic epic in which zealous Roman Catholics deliberately sacrificed themselves to fend off an attack on New France.

However, there were other versions of the story, even then, that raised questions about Dollard's intentions and actions. For one, many historians now believe that Dollard and his men went up the Ottawa River for other reasons and did not even know of the approaching Haudenosaunee. Nevertheless, Dollard did indeed divert the Haudenosaunee army temporarily from its objective in 1660, thereby allowing the settlers to harvest their crop and escape famine.

Some historians have claimed that all Frenchmen including Dollard were killed in the last valiant explosion of the famous grenade that had not made it over the wall of the fort and landed in the midst of the remaining French. Others claim that some were captured and tortured to death, and in some extreme cases even cannibalized by the Haudenosaunee. Also there are variations as to who relayed the fate of Dollard des Ormeaux, some versions claim it was Wendat survivors who delivered the grim news to the French at Ville-Marie, others claim that Catholic nuns recounted the story.

Modern historians have looked beyond the politically charged elements surrounding Dollard des Ormeaux and come up with theories that differ from the traditionally told stories of his life and demise. For instance, some have hypothesized that Dollard's motivation for heading west from Ville Marie may not have been to head off the Haudenosaunee war party. Instead, it was well known at the time that the Haudenosaunee finished their hunting expeditions for furs in the spring, and an enterprising Frenchman with military experience, such as Dollard, may have been tempted to test his mettle by risking the voyage up the Ottawa River.

Some historians have also posited that the Haudenosaunee did not continue to Montreal because it was not representative of Haudenosaunee warfare tactics. Haudenosaunee war parties sought the trophies of battle and taking prisoners. If Dollard des Ormeaux and his party did indeed stave off the Haudenosaunee attack for seven days, their defeat would have satisfied that goal and aspect of Haudenosaunee warfare.

While skeptical of Dollard's "heroic martyrdom" narrative, historian Mark Bourrie accepts that "the big Iroquois army to the south of the Long Sault was close to Montreal and might have been heading for [it]," in which case the claims of 19th-century historians about the battle's military significance "may be true," and the battle may be thought of as "French Canada's Alamo."

== See also ==
- French and Indian Wars
