= Dartmouth Natal Day Road Race =

Annual road race in Dartmouth, Nova Scotia, Canada

- Date: Natal Day (first Monday in August)
- Location: Dartmouth, Nova Scotia
- Event type: Road Race
- Distance: 2 mile & 6 mile routes
- Established: 1907
- Website: https://www.nataldayroadrace.ca/

The Dartmouth Natal Day Road Race is one of the longest running road races in North America. The event is part of the Natal Day festivities in the Halifax Regional Municipality.

== History ==
The first Natal Day Road Race took place in 1907. Dartmouthian Chris Wolfe ran the Boston Marathon that year, finishing 23rd. This spurred the Natal Day committee to add a road race to the festivities for that year.

The following year, the route took runners around Halifax Harbour and the Bedford Basin, with the race starting in Halifax, continuing through Bedford and finishing in Dartmouth. After witnessing the start of the race, spectators took a ferry across the harbour to watch the finishers.

Notable Canadian marathon runner Johnny Miles won the race in 1925.

The current race includes both a 2 mile (1 loop) and 6 mile (3 loops) race taking place on a route through downtown Dartmouth.
