= Carillon, Quebec =

Coordinates: 45.567668°N 74.375957°W

Carillon is a former municipality and an unincorporated community in Saint-André-d'Argenteuil, Quebec, Canada. It is recognized as a designated place by Statistics Canada.

== History ==
The municipality of Carillon was officially created on September 20, 1887 by separating from Argenteuil. On December 29, 1999, Carillon merged with Saint-André-Est and Saint-André-d'Argenteuil to form the municipality of Saint-André-Carillon which was eventually renamed to Saint-André-d'Argenteuil.

== Demographics ==
In the 2021 Census of Population conducted by Statistics Canada, Carillon had a population of 266 living in 115 of its 126 total private dwellings, a change of 28.5% from its 2016 population of 207. With a land area of 6.17 km^{2} (2.38 sq mi), it had a population density of 43.1/km^{2} (111.7/sq mi) in 2021.

== See also ==
- List of communities in Quebec
- List of designated places in Quebec
- List of former municipalities in Quebec
