= Natal Day =

Annual holiday in Nova Scotia, Canada

- Nova Scotian Flag
- Date 2025: Monday, August 4th, 2025
- Date 2026: Monday, August 3rd, 2026
- Website: https://www.natalday.org

Natal Day is a non-statutory holiday in Nova Scotia, Canada, celebrated on the first Monday in August. It coincides with other Civic Holidays across Canada.

== History ==
Natal Day was originally celebrated on June 21, to commemorate the establishment of Halifax.

The tradition may have been created by the Nova Scotia Philanthropic Society who inaugurated an annual picnic in 1839 to celebrate the founding of Halifax.

Historical celebrations included; pig, sheep, and ox roasts, horse races, regattas, track and field event (hurdles, high jump, foot races etc.), greasy pig contests, and greasy pole contests among others. Public drunkenness was a frequent issue with reports on Natal Day of 1894 of civilians sneaking beer from the military canteen which ultimately led to a drunken brawl between civilians and soldiers. In 1876 reports from McNab's Island picnic reported "there was not much enjoyment there... for drunkenness and fighting prevailed generally, and there were many bruised faces and black eyes" and a new word jubilated was coined to refer to the drunk and disorderly – with those completely unable to celebrate due to drunkenness being referred to as jubilous.

The first official Natal Day celebrations were held in August 1895 to mark the arrival of the new branch railroad line connecting to Dartmouth. While the rail construction was delayed, Dartmouth moved forward with a regatta and fireworks display.

In 1897, Natal Day celebrations corresponded with Queen Victoria's Diamond Jubilee. During the week long celebration which fell over June 21, the 'Jubilee' or 'Nymph' Fountain was unveiled in the Halifax Public Gardens by Ishbel, Marchioness of Aberdeen and Temair, the wife of John Campbell Gordon, 7th Earl of Aberdeen and Governor-General of Canada (1893-98).

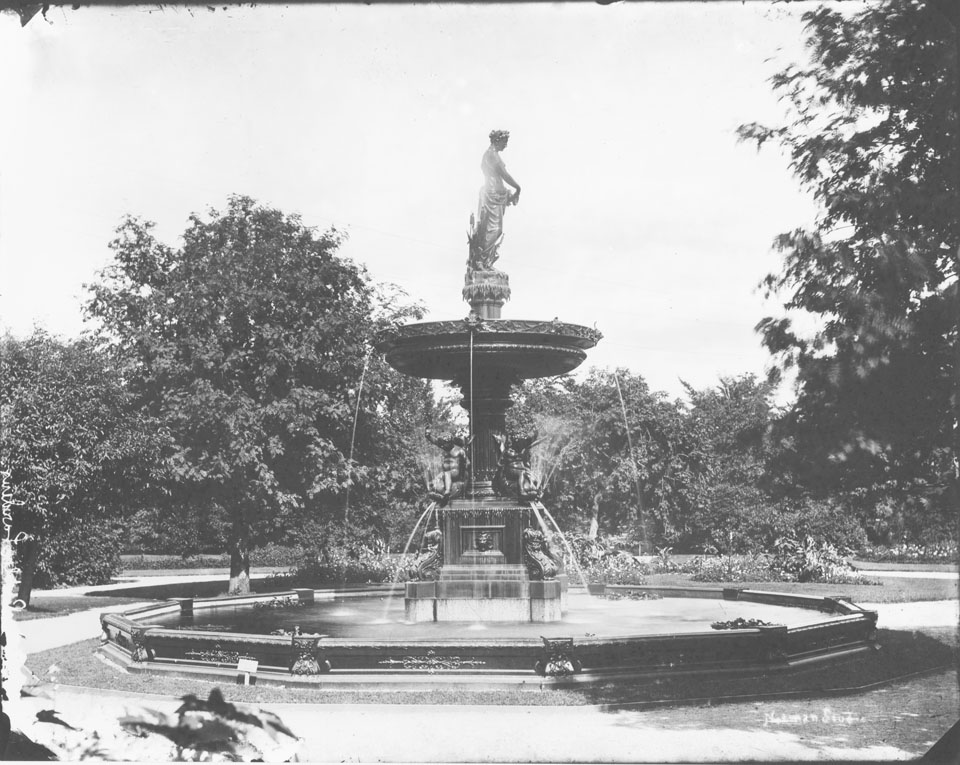
Public Gardens, Jubilee Fountain (1897)

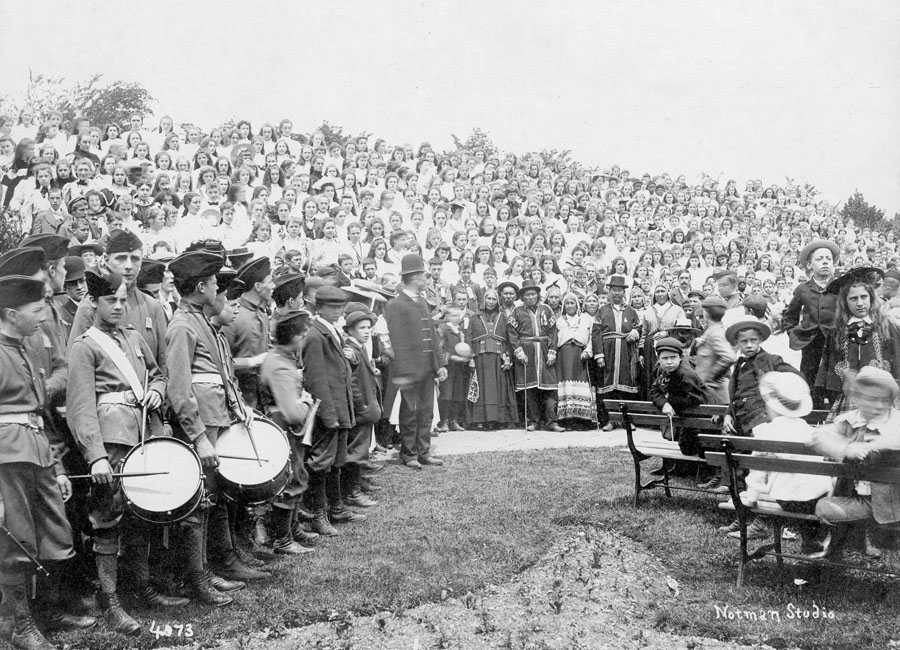
Crowd at the unveiling, including several Mi'kmaq in traditional dress.

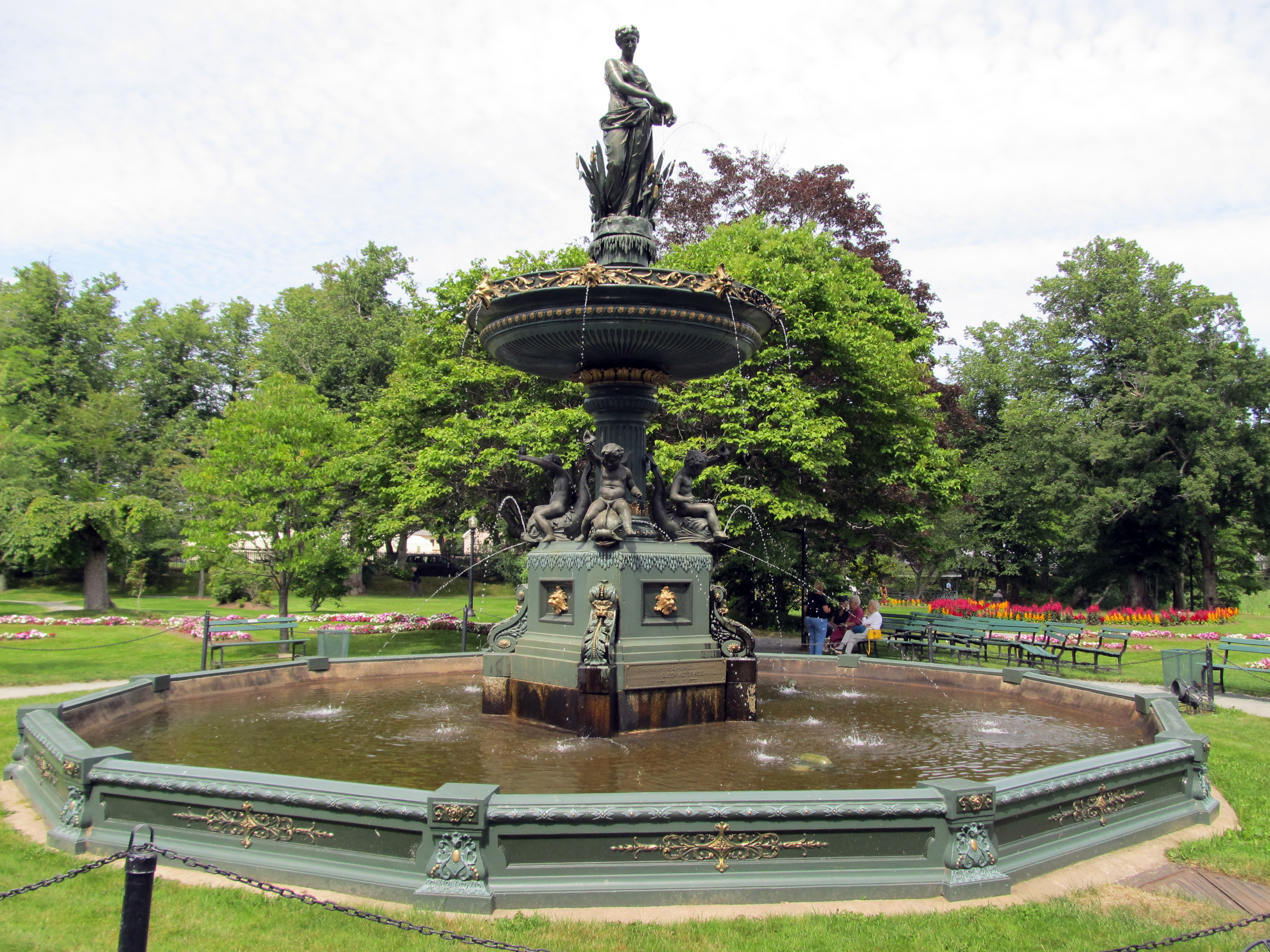
Jubilee Fountain in 2017

The name Natal Day gained popularity in 1899 with the publication of Centenary Ode, by Halifax poet laureate John A. Bell on the 150th anniversary of the founding of Halifax.

Once more we greet thee, Natal Day,
The claim to greet thee ours alone;
With blithesome songs and banners gay,
The joy that stirs our hearts be shown.

An hundred years and fifty more
Thy morning light hath blest our eyes,
And still with ever-widening roar
Our voices to thy praises rise.

We hail thee as the dawning sun
Illumes the darkness with his ray,
And though his course be but begun
We know 'twill be a glorious day.

So, till a thousand years have rolled,
May every circling hour increase
The strength of ties that ne'er grow old,
The love of liberty and peace.

— John A. Bell

By 1906, Halifax declared a half-holiday on the same day as Dartmouth’s Natal Day, solidifying the tradition of an August celebration.

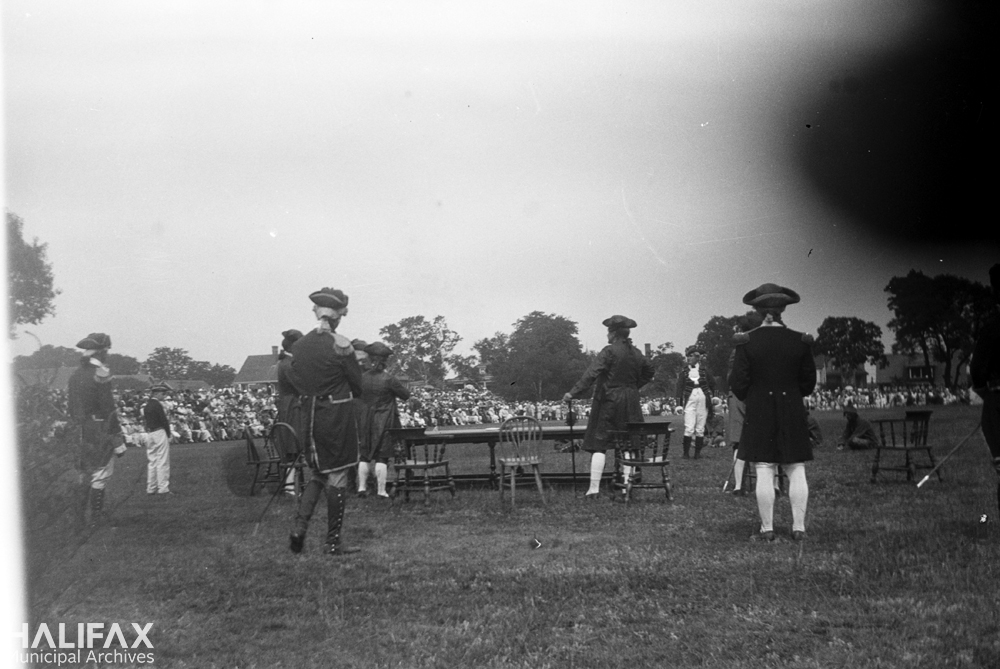
Actors in costume and crowds gathered to watch the re-enactment of Cornwallis' landing. This photo is likely from the 175th anniversary of the founding of the city of Halifax, August 4 to 16, 1924, part of a Natal Day celebration.

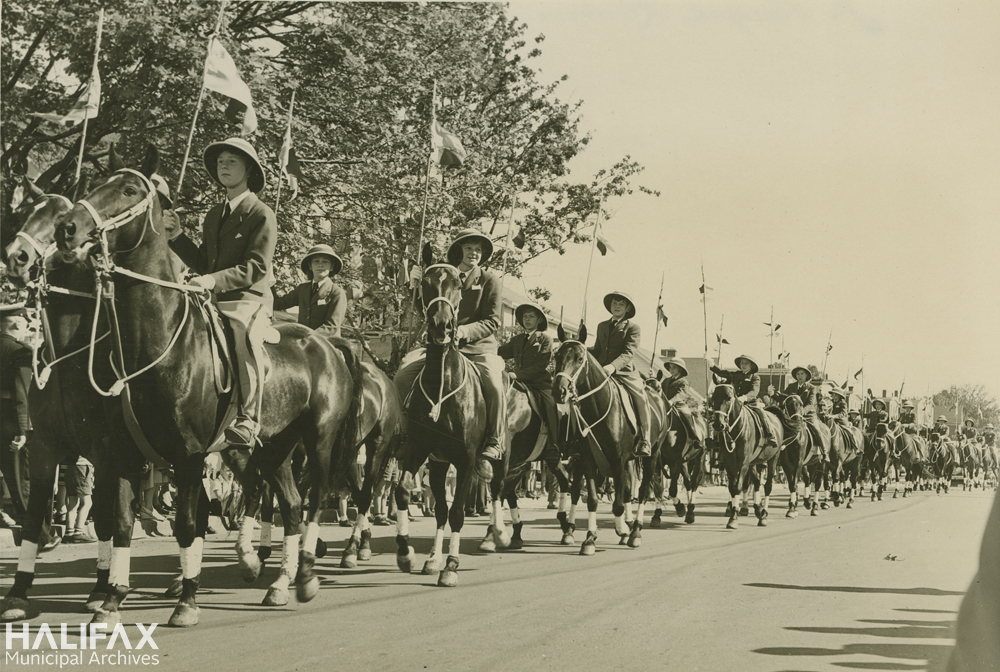
Mounted Halifax Junior Bengal Lancers in the Dartmouth Bicentenary Natal Day Parade. (1950)

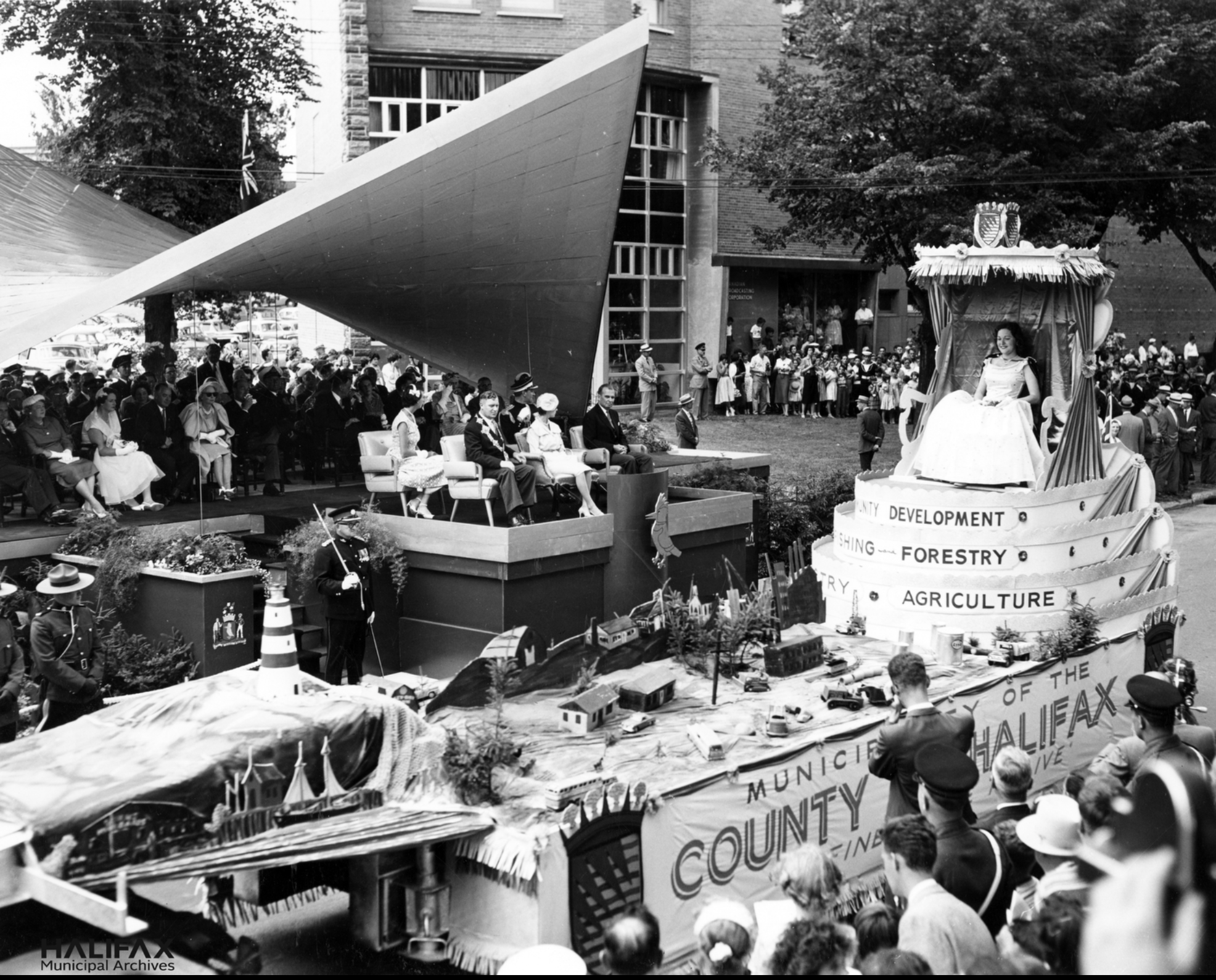
County Float in the 1958 Natal Day Parade with Miss Halifax County viewed by Princess Margaret, City of Halifax Mayor Charles Vaughan from the royal platform outside the CBC Television studios on Bell Rd.

== Celebrations ==
Natal Day weekend is marked by events across Nova Scotia including parades, picnics, concerts, local markets, street performers, fireworks, and a local road race.

The national historic site Fort Anne in Annapolis Royal hosts encampment reenactments of 18th-century British military camps over Natal Day weekend as well as a historic parade.

Since 1907, Dartmouth has hosted the Dartmouth Natal Day Road Race making it one of the oldest road running races in North America. The event was added to celebrate Dartmouthian Chris Wolfe running the Boston Marathon.

== Controversy ==
Natal Day's status as a non-statutory holiday or retail closing day is the source of some controversy. While the Civic Holiday is recognized as a statutory holiday by government offices, many unionized employers and several other provinces (including British Columbia, New Brunswick, Northwest Territories, Nunavut and Saskatchewan) – it is not a mandated or paid holiday in Nova Scotia. City services are often reduced and employers may opt to close without paying employees, in addition, employees who are scheduled to work do not have the right to refuse. Nova Scotia ties P.E.I. and Newfoundland & Labrador for the lowest number of public holidays in Canada with six.

In 1931, a statue of Edward Cornwallis was unveiled in downtown Halifax over Natal Day weekend to commemorate the 182nd anniversary of the founding of Halifax. In July 2017, protests surrounding the removal of the statue – due to Cornwallis' treatment of indigenous people, the 1749 scalp proclamation, and its general homage to colonial history – demanded the city remove the statue by Natal Day. While city officials, including mayor Mike Savage, initially disagreed, the statue was subsequently removed and place in temporary storage in January 2018 in consultation with local First Nations after threats were made to tear the statue down during an upcoming planned protest.

== See also ==
- Mi'kmaq
