= Victoria Day (Scotland) =

Public holiday in Scotland

- Observed by: Scotland
- Date: last Monday before or on 24 May
- 2025 date: 19 May
- 2026 date: 18 May
- 2027 date: 24 May
- 2028 date: 22 May
- Frequency: Annual

Victoria Day (Scottish Gaelic: Latha Victoria) is a public holiday in parts of Eastern Central Scotland, chiefly the cities of Dundee and Edinburgh, although it was formerly more widespread. It is celebrated on the last Monday before or on 24 May and commemorates Queen Victoria's birthday (24 May 1819), exactly like Victoria Day in Canada.

Traditionally schools, and some offices and shops, are closed on Victoria Day, but it is not a bank holiday, meaning that government offices and banks remain open. Because of its proximity to the Spring Bank Holiday a week later, Victoria Day is often marked on that date. As with many public holidays very few shops in Scotland now observe it.

In 2017, the City of Dundee council lists the Spring Bank Holiday (29 May) as Victoria Day, whilst the City of Edinburgh lists Victoria Day as being 22 May. It is no longer listed as a recognised public holiday in areas where it was formerly observed, including Renfrewshire and Perth and Kinross.
