= Victoria Day =

Canadian public holiday

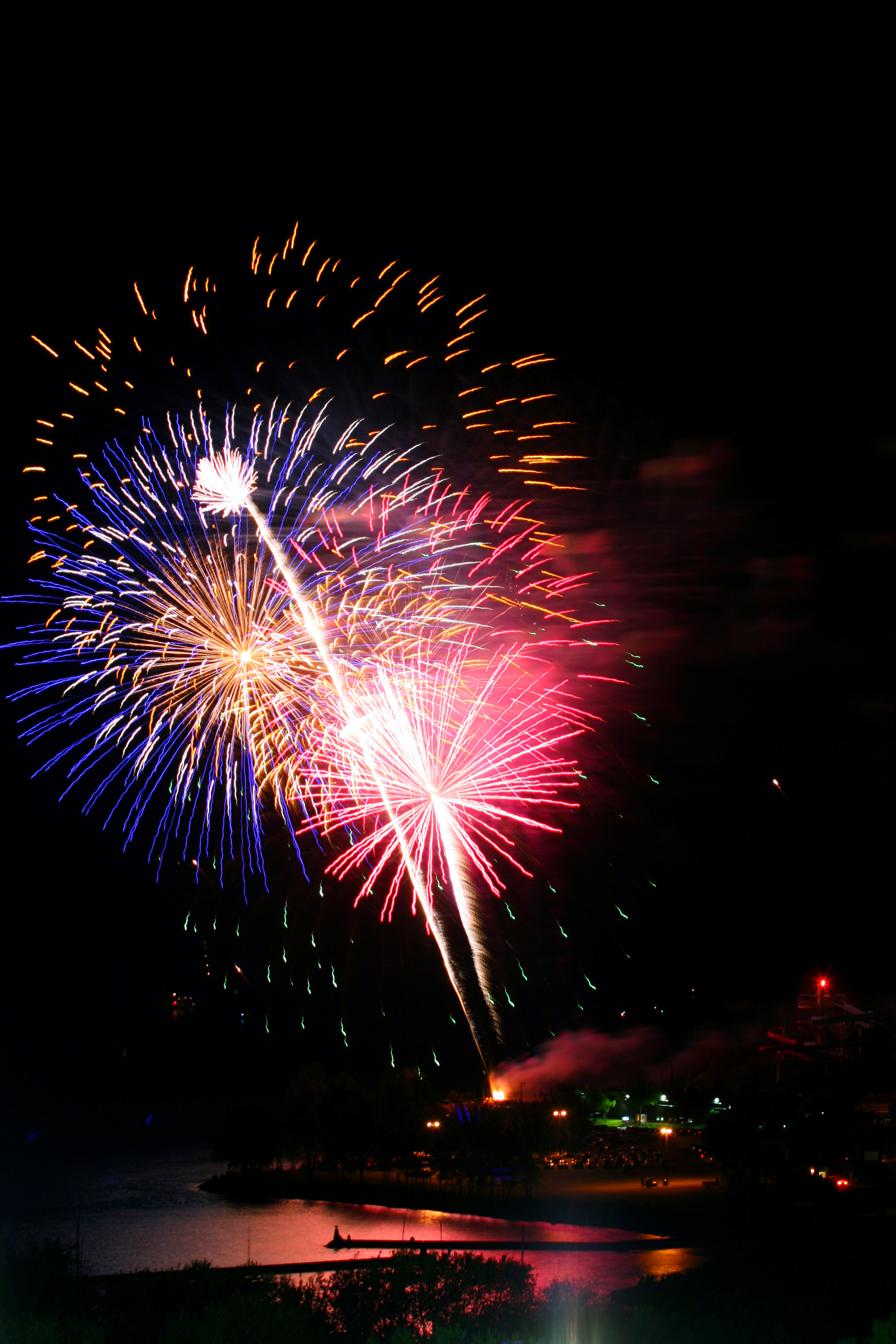
- Victoria Day fireworks display from Ontario Place, Toronto, in 2010
- Official name: Victoria Day; French: Fête de la Reine
- Also called: May Long Weekend, May Long, May Two-Four, May Run, Firecracker Day
- Observed by: Canadians
- Type: Historical, cultural, nationalist
- Significance: Birthday of Queen Victoria
- Celebrations: Fireworks, parades, barbecues
- Date: Last Monday preceding May 25
- 2025 date: May 19, 2025
- 2026 date: May 18, 2026
- 2027 date: May 24, 2027
- 2028 date: May 22, 2028
- Frequency: Annual
- Related to: Sovereign's Birthday; Commonwealth Day (until 1977)

Victoria Day (French: Fête de la Reine, lit. 'Celebration of the Queen') is a federal Canadian public holiday observed on the last Monday preceding May 25 to honour Queen Victoria, who is known as the "Mother of Confederation". The holiday has existed in Canada since at least 1845, originally on Victoria's natural birthday, May 24. It falls on the Monday between the 18th and the 24th (inclusive) and, so, is always the penultimate Monday of May (May 18 in 2026 and May 24 in 2027). Victoria Day is a federal statutory holiday, as well as a holiday in six of Canada's ten provinces and all three of its territories. The holiday has always been a distinctly Canadian observance and continues to be celebrated across the country. It is informally considered the start of the summer season in Canada.

The same date is also, since 1952, recognized as the currently reigning Canadian monarch's official birthday (though, previously, that event had been marked in Canada typically on each monarch's actual birthday). In Quebec, before 2003, the Monday preceding May 25 of each year was unofficially the Fête de Dollard, a commemoration of Adam Dollard des Ormeaux, initiated in the 1920s to coincide with Victoria Day. In 2003, provincial legislation officially created National Patriots' Day (French: Journée nationale des Patriotes) on the same date.

== History ==
Royal birthdays for members of French and British royal families were commemorated in various parts of Canada since the 17th century. These were ad hoc commemorations, rather than holidays enshrined in law. Early commemorations were typically marked by an official ceremony, such as a levee and military review, banquets, and sporting events. Several different days were used to celebrate a sovereign's birthday. The birth date for George III, June 4, was observed from the late 18th century to decades after his death in 1820. Until the mid-19th century, the monarch's birthday was more of a military occasion than a civil celebration, as it was the day when able-bodied men in the colony assembled into their militia units for their compulsory military training, as well as attended reviews and celebrations in commemoration of the monarch.

Shortly after the Canadas were united into the Province of Canada, the Parliament sought to create a new public holiday that would form common ground between English and French Canadians, helping them transcend their religious and cultural differences. The birthday of Queen Victoria was selected to be transformed into a public holiday, as it was a date that appealed to both English and French Canadians. At the time, loyalty to the Crown was seen as a key trait that distinguished Canada from the United States and the monarchy was viewed as a "guarantor of minority rights" in the colony. The Queen's birthday was officially designated as a public holiday by legislation passed in 1845, transforming the date from a military event to a civilian holiday and making it Canada's now-oldest official holiday.

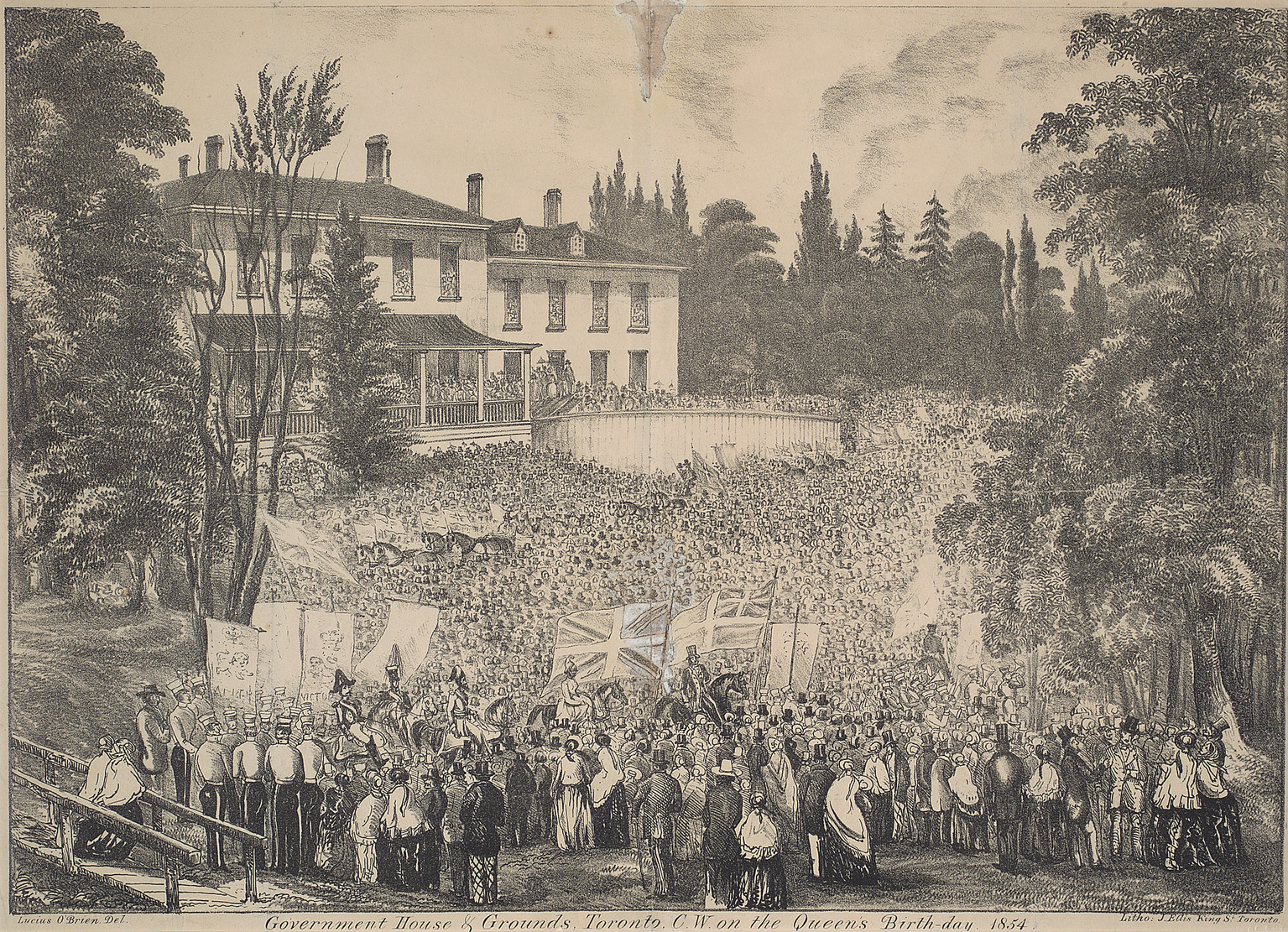
Crowds gather outside Government House in Toronto, Canada West (now Ontario), on Victoria Day, 1854

On Victoria's 35th birthday, in 1854, some 5,000 residents of Canada West gathered in front of Government House (near present-day King and Simcoe Streets in Toronto) to "give cheers to their queen". An example of a typical 19th-century celebration of the Queen's birthday took place on May 24, 1866, in Omemee, also in Canada West: The town mounted a day-long fête, including pre-dawn serenades, picnics, athletic competitions, a display of illuminations, a torch-light procession, and a gun salute at midnight. By Canadian Confederation in 1867, Victoria Day celebrations were held in communities in Ontario and Quebec and would later spread to other parts of the country as it expanded.

Even as the inhabitants of the Red River Colony, in the then-British territory of Rupert's Land, resisted Canadian expansion, clashing with agents of Canada's government in 1869 and 1870 as Canada negotiated the purchase of Rupert's Land from Britain, the Red River Colony's provisional government celebrated Victoria's birthday with a show of skill at the militia's drill.

The day had become a "patriotic holiday" by the 1890s. Amid the Victoria's Diamond Jubilee in 1897, the Senate passed a bill that aimed to fix the Queen's birthday in perpetuity as a holiday in her honour. It was sent to the House of Commons, where it languished as a private member's bill without government support. It was not until after Victoria's death in May 1901 that the Queen's Birthday was made a perpetual statutory holiday by which to remember the late Queen, who was deemed the "Mother of Confederation". Some members of Parliament proposed the holiday keep the name Queen's Birthday, while others proposed changing it to Queen Victoria Day or Victorian Empire Day. The name Victoria Day was selected by Prime Minister Wilfrid Laurier, who wanted to avoid an imperialist name that would antagonize French Canadians. The Crown-in-Council, the following year, designated May 24 as the official birthday of King Edward VII.

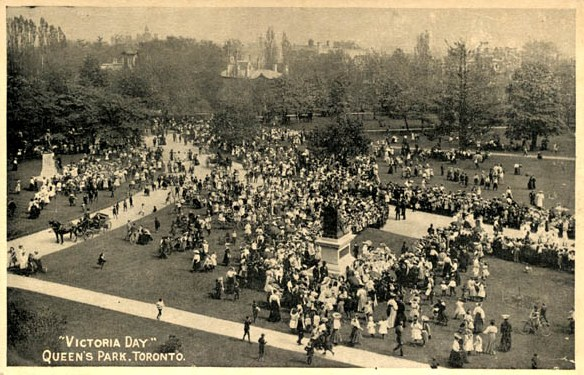
Victoria Day celebrations at Queen's Park, in Toronto, 1910

Victoria Day served as the King's official birthday until 1910, when King George V acceded to the throne. From then until 1952, Victoria Day only honoured Queen Victoria's contribution to Canadian Confederation, with the reigning monarch's official birthday typically observed in June, instead. However, for King George VI's tour of Canada in 1939, the King's official birthday was changed to May 20, so he could be present for official festivities; still, Victoria Day was also treated as a day to celebrate the King's birthday.

In 1952, the date for Victoria Day was made variable, changing from May 24 to the last Monday before May 25 each year, ensuring that most Canadians would receive a long weekend. The monarch's official birthday in Canada was, by annual viceregal proclamations between 1953 and 1956, made to fall on the same day as Victoria Day. On January 31, 1957, the link was made permanent by royal proclamation.

=== Relation with Empire Day ===
Cover for the 1952 Empire Day program issued by Ontario's Department of Education. Empire Day took place the weekday before Victoria Day from 1898 to 1976.

Shortly after Queen Victoria's Diamond Jubilee in 1898, Clementina Trenholme advocated the creation of Empire Day, a complementary auxiliary event that would occur the weekday before the Queen's Birthday. Empire Day was not intended to be a general holiday like Victoria Day, but, was instead intended to provide schools and civic institutions the opportunity to implement activities and lessons on Canada and the British Empire before the monarch's official birthday. The event was adopted by several schools in Ontario, Nova Scotia, and Quebec. May 24 was, by imperial decree in 1904, made Empire Day throughout the British Empire.

In 1958, Empire Day was renamed Commonwealth Day. In 1977, the day was moved to the second Monday in March, ending its association as an "opening act" to Victoria Day in Canada.

=== Incidents ===
Victoria Day celebrations have been marred by major tragedy at least twice. In 1881, the passenger ferry Victoria overturned in the Thames River near London, Ontario. The boat departed in the evening with 600 to 800 people on board—three times the allowed passenger capacity—and capsized partway across the river, drowning some 182 individuals, including a large number of children who had been with their families for Victoria Day picnics at Springbank Park. The event came to be known as the "Victoria Day disaster".

The Point Ellice Bridge disaster occurred in Victoria, British Columbia, on May 26, 1896, when a bridge collapsed under the weight of a streetcar overloaded with passengers on their way to attend Victoria Day celebrations.

== Provincial and territorial legislation ==
Most workplaces in Canada are regulated by the provincial or territorial governments. Therefore, although Victoria Day is a statutory holiday for federal purposes, whether an employee is entitled to a paid day off generally depends on the province or territory of residence (with the exception of employees in federally regulated workplaces such as banks).

The status of Victoria Day in each of the provinces and territories is as follows: It is a general holiday in Alberta, Manitoba, the Northwest Territories, and Yukon and is a statutory holiday in British Columbia, Ontario, and Saskatchewan. Victoria Day is not a paid public holiday but is a government holiday in: Newfoundland and Labrador; Nova Scotia, where it is also not a designated retail closing day, but is considered a "non-statutory holiday"; and Prince Edward Island, although provincial legislation defines "holiday" to include Victoria Day. In Nunavut and New Brunswick, the date is set as a general holiday (for New Brunswick, a prescribed day of rest on which retail businesses must be closed) to mark the reigning sovereign's official birthday.

Beginning in the 1920s, French Canadians in Quebec informally called the May holiday Fête de Dollard, after Adam Dollard des Ormeaux, an early colonist of New France. In 2002, the provincial government of Quebec replaced Fête de Dollard with National Patriots' Day, which commemorates the patriotes of the Lower Canada Rebellion of 1837.

Jurisdiction	Paid holiday (for provincially regulated employees)
Alberta	Yes
British Columbia	Yes
Manitoba	Yes
Newfoundland and Labrador	No (government employees only)
New Brunswick	No (but retail businesses must be closed)
Nova Scotia	No
Ontario	Yes (except for employees of the Crown and certain public bodies)
Prince Edward Island	No
Quebec	Yes (equivalent holiday)
Saskatchewan	Yes
Northwest Territories	Yes
Nunavut	Yes
Yukon	Yes

== Practice ==
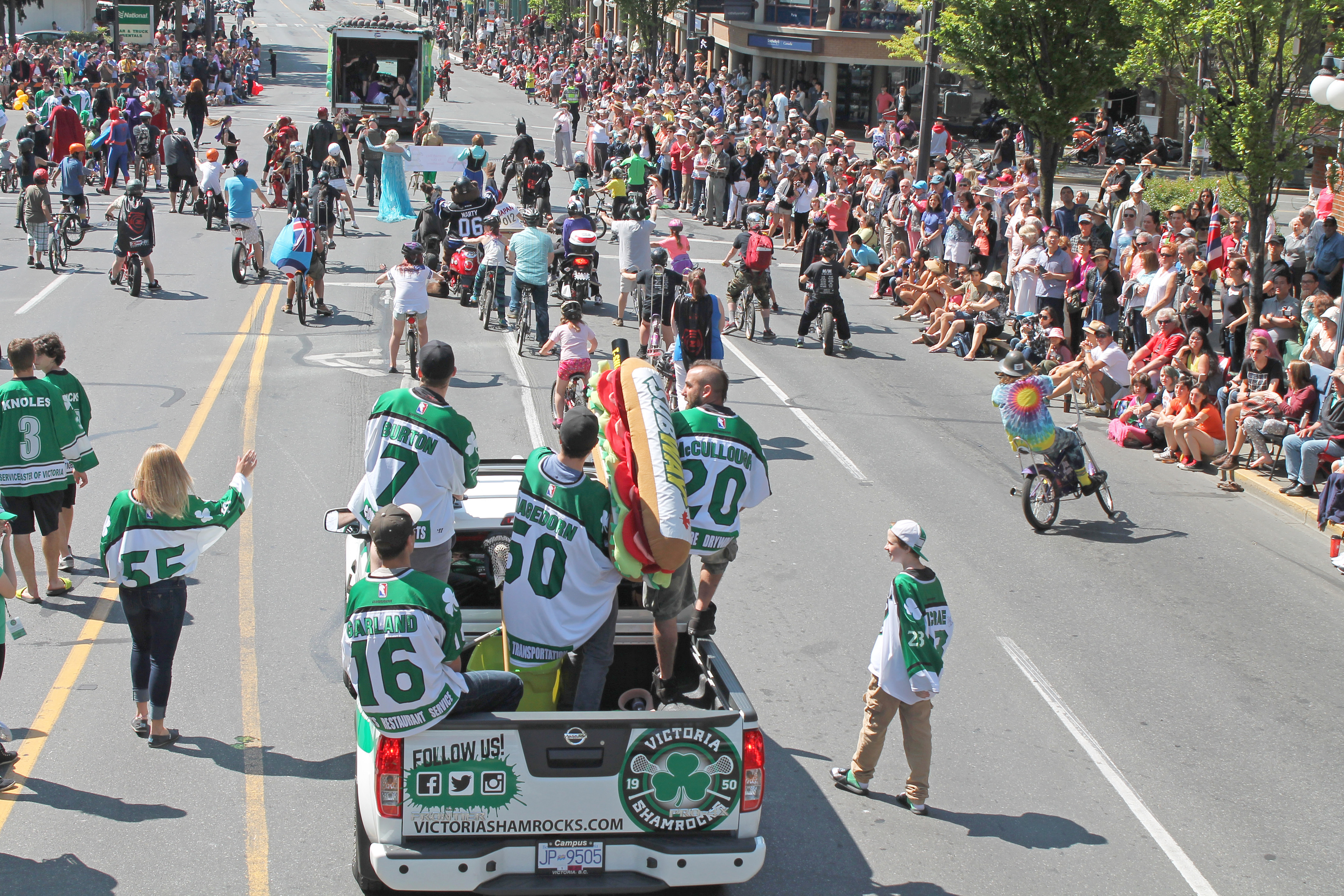
A crowd lines a street in Victoria, British Columbia, for the 2015 Victoria Day parade

Canada is the only country that commemorates Queen Victoria with an official holiday. Federal government protocol dictates that, on Victoria Day, the Royal Union Flag is to be flown from sunrise to sunset at all federal government buildings—including airports, military bases, and other Crown owned property across the country—where physical arrangements allow (i.e. where a second flag pole exists, as the Royal Union Flag can never displace the national flag).

Several cities hold a parade on the holiday, with the most prominent being that which has taken place since 1898 in the monarch's namesake city of Victoria, British Columbia. In nearby New Westminster, the Victoria Day weekend is distinguished by the Hyack Anvil Battery Salute, a tradition created during colonial times as a surrogate for a 21-gun salute: Gunpowder is placed between two anvils, the top one upturned, and the charge is ignited, hurling the upper anvil into the air. Other celebrations include an evening fireworks show, such as that held at Ashbridge's Bay Beach in the east end of Toronto, and at Ontario Place, in the same city.

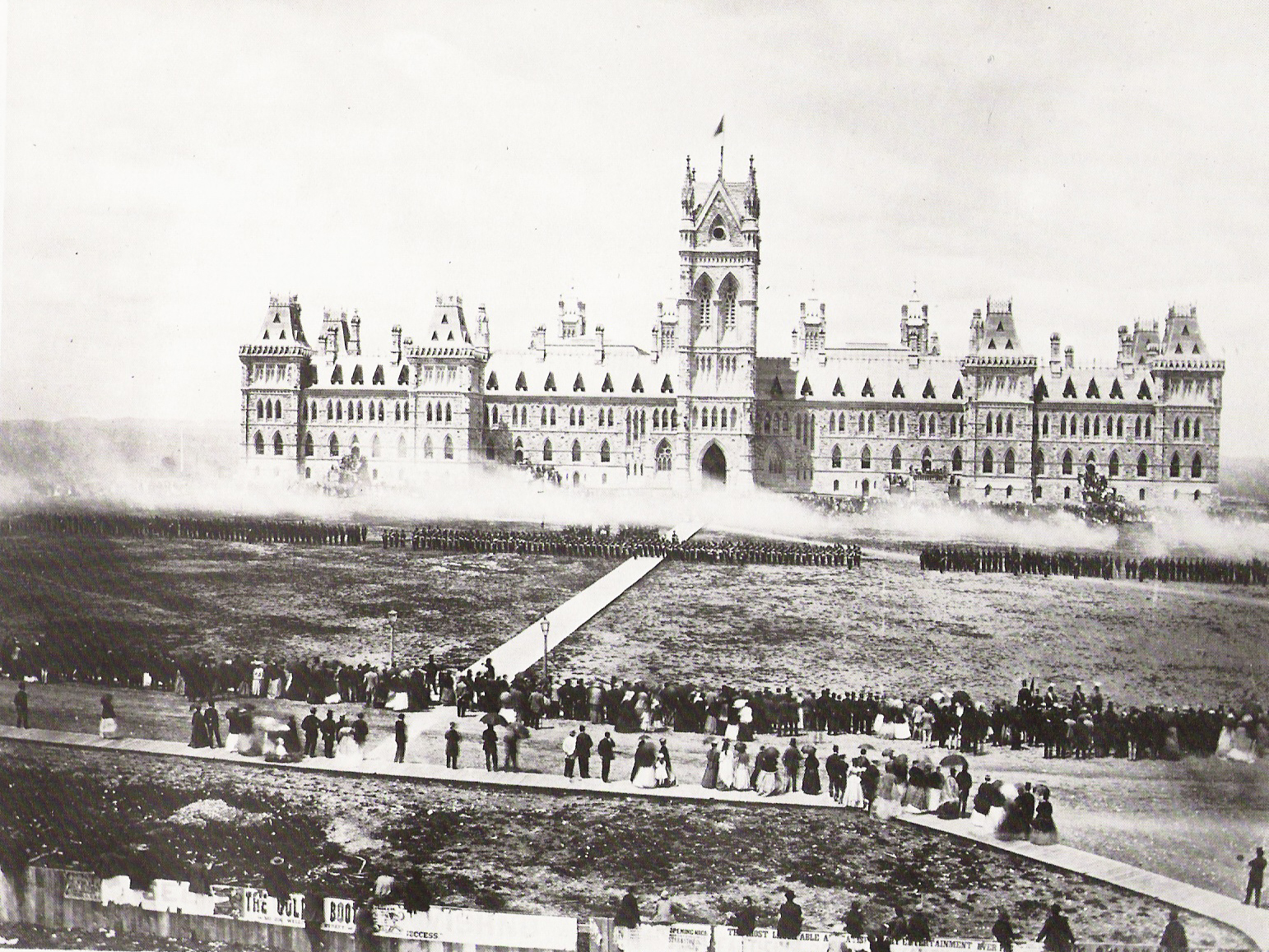
Members of the Canadian Militia perform a feu-de-joie at Parliament Hill in Ottawa for the Queen's Birthday Review, 1868

In Ottawa, the traditional Trooping the Colour ceremony takes place on Parliament Hill or occasionally at Rideau Hall. The reviewing officer in the ceremony is the monarch, with members of the royal family, the governor general, the minister of national defence, or the chief of the defence staff taking the sovereign's place in their absence. The participating units in the parade include personnel of the Governor General's Foot Guards and The Canadian Grenadier Guards, both of which are part of the ad hoc Ceremonial Guard.

Across the country, Victoria Day serves as the unofficial marker of the end of the winter social season and, thus, the beginning of the summer social calendar. Banff, Alberta's Sunshine Village ends its lengthy ski season on Victoria Day and, likewise, it is during this long weekend that many summer businesses—such as parks, outdoor restaurants, bicycle rentals, city tour operators, etc.—will open. Victoria Day is also a mark of the beginning of the cottage season, when cottage owners may reverse the winterization of their property. Gardeners in Canada will similarly regard Victoria Day as the beginning of spring, as it falls at a time when one can be fairly certain that frost will not return until the next autumn. There is also a change in fashion: lighter-coloured summer clothing was traditionally worn from Victoria Day through to Labour Day.

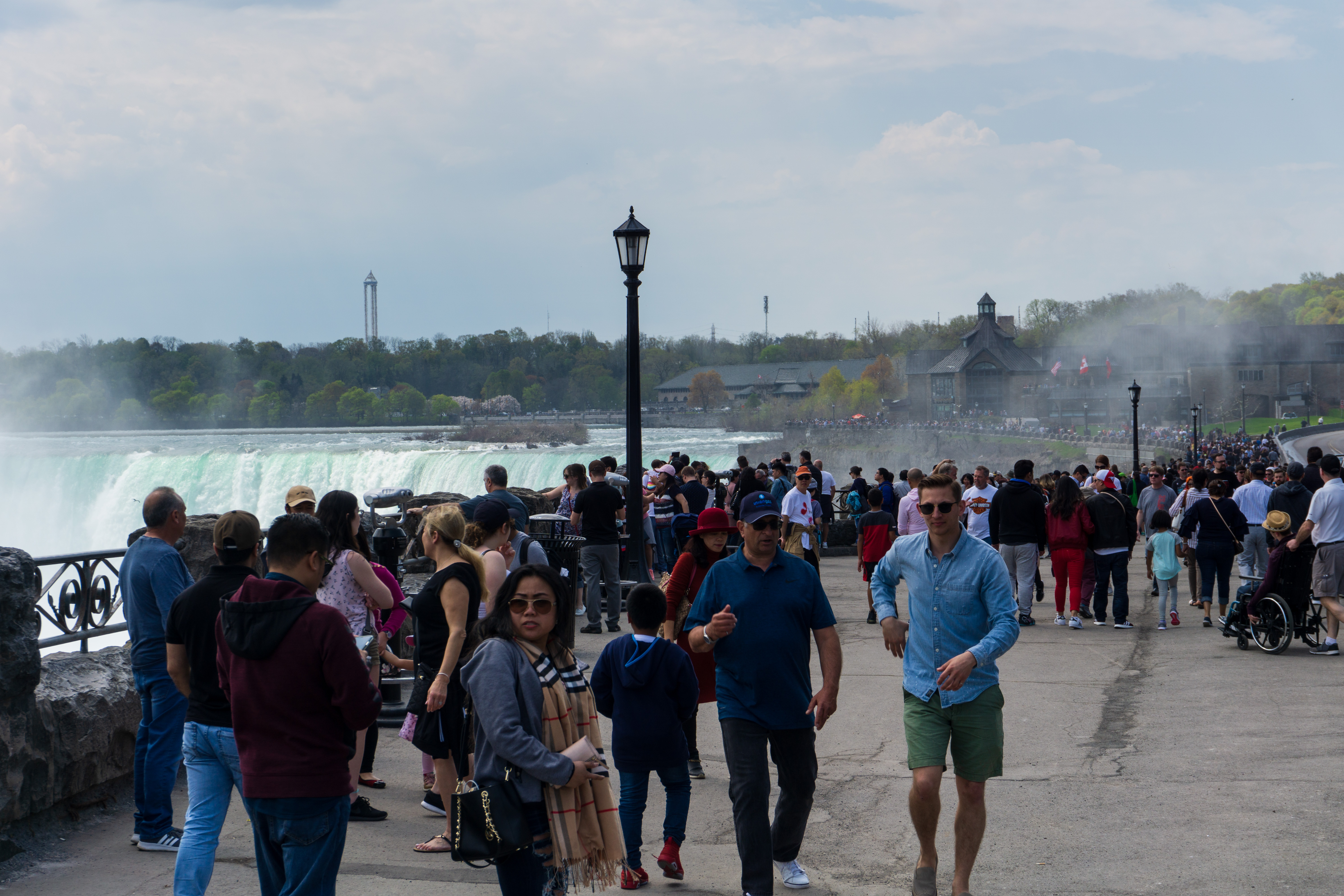
A large group of people looking at Niagara Falls during the Victoria Day long weekend in 2019

The holiday is colloquially known in parts of Canada as "May Two-Four", a double entendre that refers both to the date around which the holiday falls (May 24) and the Canadian slang for a case of twenty-four beers (a "two-four"), a drink popular during the long weekend. The holiday weekend may also be known as the "May long weekend", "May Long", or in Timmins and surrounding areas, "May Run",. The term "Firecracker Day" was also once employed in Ontario.

A traditional rhyme about Victoria Day goes as follows: "The twenty-fourth of May / Is the Queen's birthday; / If they don't give us a holiday / We'll all run away!" The holiday is referenced in the song "Lakeside Park" by Canadian rock band Rush, from their 1975 album Caress of Steel. The song contains the line, "everyone would gather on the 24th of May, sitting in the sand to watch the fireworks display".

== See also ==
- Monarchism in Canada
- Bermuda Day
- Memorial Day
- Victoria Day (Scotland)
