= LaSalle station (Exo) =

Railway station in Montreal, Quebec, Canada

LaSalle
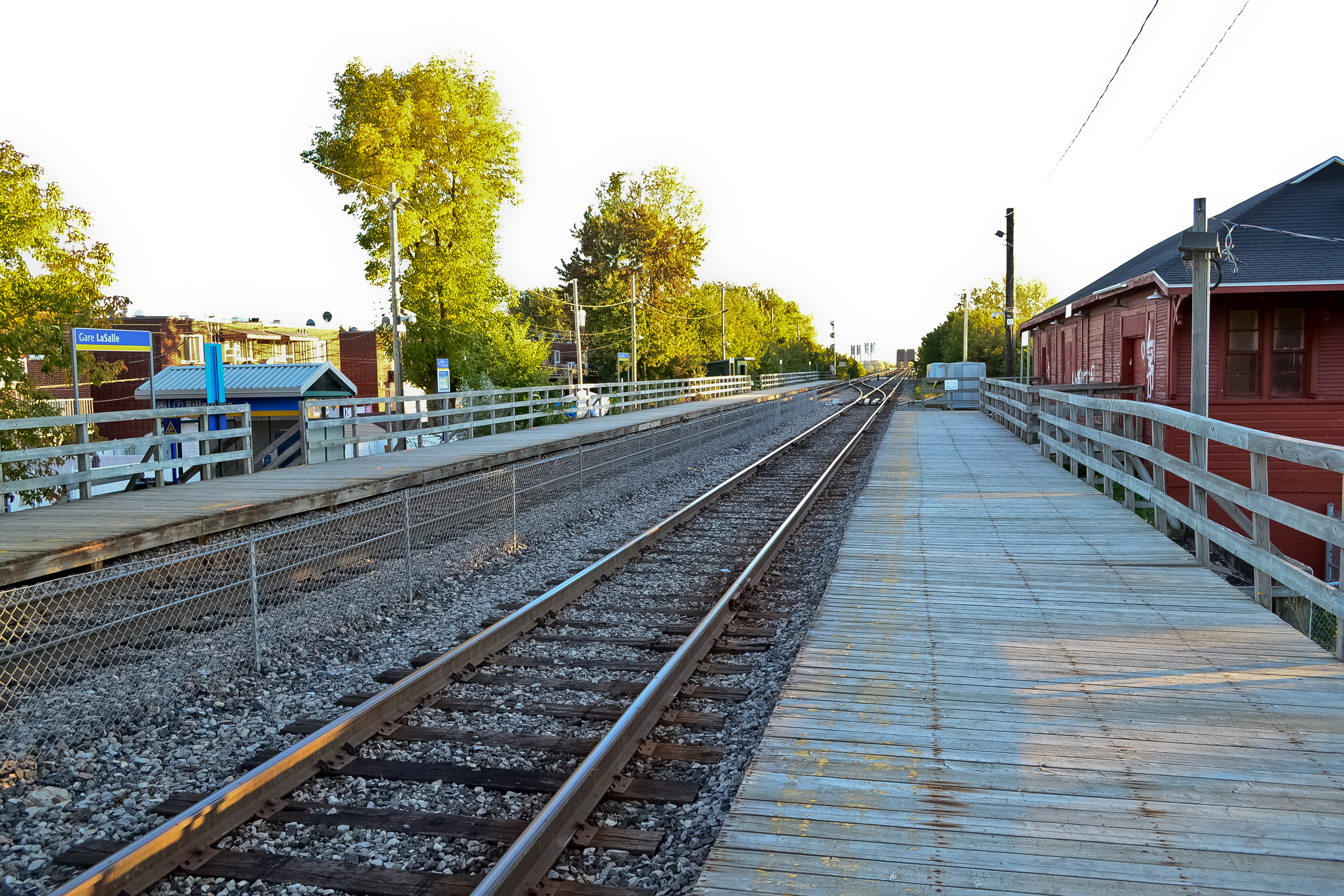

General information
- Location: 9 Highlands Avenue; LaSalle, Quebec H8R 3N2
- Coordinates: 45°25′32″N 73°39′25″W
- Operator: Exo
- Platforms: 2 side platforms
- Tracks: 2
- Connections: STM bus

Construction
- Parking: None
- Cycle facilities: 24 spaces

Other information
- Fare zone: ARTM: A
- Website: Lasalle station (RTM)

Passengers
- 2019: 145,700

Services
Preceding station	Exo	Following station
Du Canal toward Lucien-L'Allier	Line 14 – Candiac	Sainte-Catherine toward Candiac
Former services
Preceding station	Canadian Pacific Railway	Following station
Adirondack Junction toward Wells River	Montreal – Wells River	Montreal West toward Montreal Windsor
Adirondack Junction toward McAdam	Montreal – McAdam	Montreal West toward Montreal Windsor
Location

LaSalle station is a commuter rail station operated by Exo in the borough of LaSalle in Montreal, Quebec, Canada. It opened September 4th, 2001.

It is served by the Candiac line, and is the last station on the island of Montreal. It is located in ARTM fare zone A.

== Location ==
The station is accessible from Highlands Avenue north of LaSalle Boulevard to the west, and Airlie Street to the east.

== Connecting bus routes ==
Société de transport de Montréal
No.	Route	Connects to	Service times / notes
101	Saint-Patrick	Lionel-Groulx; Angrignon; Terminus Lafleur / Newman	Weekdays only
110	Centrale	Angrignon	Daily
