= Exo Richelain / Roussillon sector =

- Parent: Exo
- Founded: July 1st, 2017
- Service area: La Prairie, Candiac, Saint-Constant, Sainte-Catherine and others
- Service type: Bus service, paratransit
- Routes: 38
- Hubs: Terminus La Prairie, Terminus Montcalm-Candiac, Terminus Georges-Gagné
- Annual ridership: 1,640,073 (2024)
- Operator: Transdev
- Website: https://exo.quebec/en/trip-planner/bus/LRRS

The Exo Richelain / Roussillon sector is the division of Exo that delivers bus service to the municipalities of La Prairie, Candiac, Delson, Saint-Constant, Saint-Philippe and Sainte-Catherine, which are suburbs southeast of Montreal, Quebec, Canada. The territory serviced lies in the Roussillon Regional County Municipality.

== History ==
At the time when Exo was created in 2017, the territory that this now sector covers was served by three organizations:

- CIT Richelain that covered bus service for La Prairie, Candiac and Saint-Philippe (and prior to 2001 the communities that now form Saint-Jean-sur-Richelieu);
- CIT Roussillon, created in 1984 and providing commuter bus service to Delson, Saint-Constant and Sainte-Catherine; and
- TARSO, that offered paratransit to all of the municipalities above.

The expired contract for transport services between Transdev Limocar and CIT Roussillon was a 10-year contract that ended on July 15, 2018. In 2018, Exo awarded Transdev the contract to run service for the Richelain sector. The contract start date was January 1, 2019 and runs till June 30, 2024 with a 3-year option for exo to extend the contract till June 30, 2027.

Exo operated Roussillon and Le Richelian as their own sectors until they were merged on July 31, 2023, when the Réseau express métropolitain opened. The new sector's bus network was reconfigured to send commuters heading downtown to Panama and Brossard stations instead of Terminus Centre-Ville.

== Services ==
=== Local bus routes ===
Local routes
No.	Route	Connects to	Service times / notes
134	Saint-Philippe - Candiac	Terminus Montcalm-Candiac	Daily
135	Taxi collectif Saint-Philippe - Candiac (Gare)	Candiac	Weekdays, peak only
140	La Prairie (Balmoral - Briqueterie - Magdeleine)	Terminus La Prairie	Daily
141	La Prairie (Magdeleine - Briqueterie - Balmoral)	Terminus La Prairie	Daily
142	Candiac (Montcalm - Fouquet - Haendel)	Terminus Montcalm-Candiac	Weekdays only
143	Candiac - La Prairie	Terminus Montcalm-Candiac	Weekdays only
144	La Prairie (Symbiocité)	Terminus La Prairie	Daily
145	Taxi Collectif Candiac / Delson (Industriel)	Terminus Georges-Gagné; Terminus Montcalm-Candiac	Weekdays, peak only
146	Candiac (Deauville - Carrefour - Gare)	Candiac; Terminus Montcalm-Candiac	Weekdays only
147	Candiac (Barcelone - Carrefour - Gare)	Candiac; Terminus Montcalm-Candiac	Weekdays only
150	Sainte-Catherine (Brébeuf - Montchamp - Gare)	Sainte-Catherine	Weekdays, peak only
151	Delson (Principale N.) - Sainte-Catherine	Terminus Georges-Gagné	Weekdays only
152	Delson (Principale Sud - Gare)	Delson; Terminus Georges-Gagné	Weekdays only
153	Saint-Constant (Saint-Pierre - Gare - Beauvais)	Saint-Constant; Terminus Georges-Gagné	Weekdays only
154	Sainte-Catherine (Marie-Victorin - Écluses)	Terminus Georges-Gagné	Weekdays only
155	Delson - Saint-Constant (Gare Sainte-Catherine)	Sainte-Catherine; Terminus Georges-Gagné	Weekdays only
156	Saint-Constant (Smartcentres - Monchamp - Gare)	Sainte-Catherine; Terminus Georges-Gagné	Weekdays only
157	Taxi collectif Sainte-Catherine (Éperviers-Orioles)	Terminus Georges-Gagné	Weekdays, peak only
158	Taxi collectif Sainte-Catherine (Industriel)	Terminus Georges-Gagné	Weekdays, peak only

=== On-demand bus routes ===
On-demand bus routes
No.	Route	Connects to	Service times / notes
355	Candiac, Delson, Saint-Constant, Sainte-Catherine	Candiac; Delson; Saint-Constant; Sainte-Catherine; Terminus Georges-Gagné; Terminus Montcalm-Candiac	Weekends and statutory holidays, day and evening; Reserve between 30 minutes and 7 days in advance; Reservations via exo transport à la demande mobile app

=== Express bus routes ===
Express routes
No.	Route	Connects to	Service times / notes
450	La Prairie (Magdeleine) – Terminus Brossard	Brossard	Weekdays, peak only
451	La Prairie (Briqueterie) – Terminus Brossard	Brossard	Weekdays, peak only
452	La Prairie (Symbiocité-Briqueterie) – Terminus Brossard	Brossard	Weekdays, peak only
453	La Prairie (Vieux La Prairie) – Terminus Panama	Panama	Weekdays, peak only
454	Candiac (Charlemagne) – Terminus Brossard	Brossard	Weekdays, peak only
455	Candiac (Deauville) – Terminus Brossard	Brossard	Weekdays, peak only
456	Candiac (Fouquet) – Terminus Brossard	Brossard	Weekdays, peak only
457	Saint-Philippe – Terminus Brossard	Brossard	Weekdays, peak only
459	Candiac – Terminus Panama	Panama; Terminus Montcalm-Candiac	Weekdays, peak only
550	La Prairie – Longueuil (Cégep É.-Montpetit)	Longueuil–Université-de-Sherbrooke; Terminus La Prairie	Weekdays only
551	Candiac – Longueuil (Cégep É.-Montpetit)	Longueuil–Université-de-Sherbrooke; Terminus Montcalm-Candiac	Weekdays only
552	Saint-Constant - Delson - Terminus Brossard	Brossard; Sainte-Catherine	Weekdays, peak only
553	Sainte-Catherine - Delson - Terminus Panama	Panama	Weekdays, peak only
554	Delson - Terminus Brossard	Brossard; Terminus Georges-Gagné	Weekdays, peak only
555	Delson - Longueuil (Cégep É.-Montpetit)	Longueuil–Université-de-Sherbrooke; Terminus Georges-Gagné	Weekdays only
556	Delson - Montréal (Angrignon - Cégep A-Laurendeau)	Angrignon; Terminus Lafleur / Newman; Terminus Georges-Gagné	Weekdays only

== Former Exo Roussillon bus routes ==
Exo Roussillon bus routes
No.	Route description
30	Off-peak local circuit, with routes 30A and 30B running in opposite directions.
31	Sainte-Catherine (via Jogues/des Cascades)
32	Sainte-Catherine (via St-Laurent/des Ecluses)
33	Sainte-Catherine and Saint-Constant
34	Saint-Constant
35	Saint-Constant and Delson
36	Delson South
37/115	Delson North
100	Express Georges Gagné / Terminus Centre-Ville
130	Terminus Centre-Ville (via Terminus Panama, Taschereau Blvd, CLSC Kateri, Principale Nord) Georges Gagné
200	Ville Lasalle, Metro Jolicoeur (via Cégep André-Laurendeau & Metro Angrignon) Georges Gagné
210	Longueuil, Terminus Longueuil (via Collège Édouard-Montpetit Georges Gagné )

== See also ==
- Exo bus services
