= Sainte-Catherine station (Exo) =

Railway station in Quebec, Canada

Sainte-Catherine
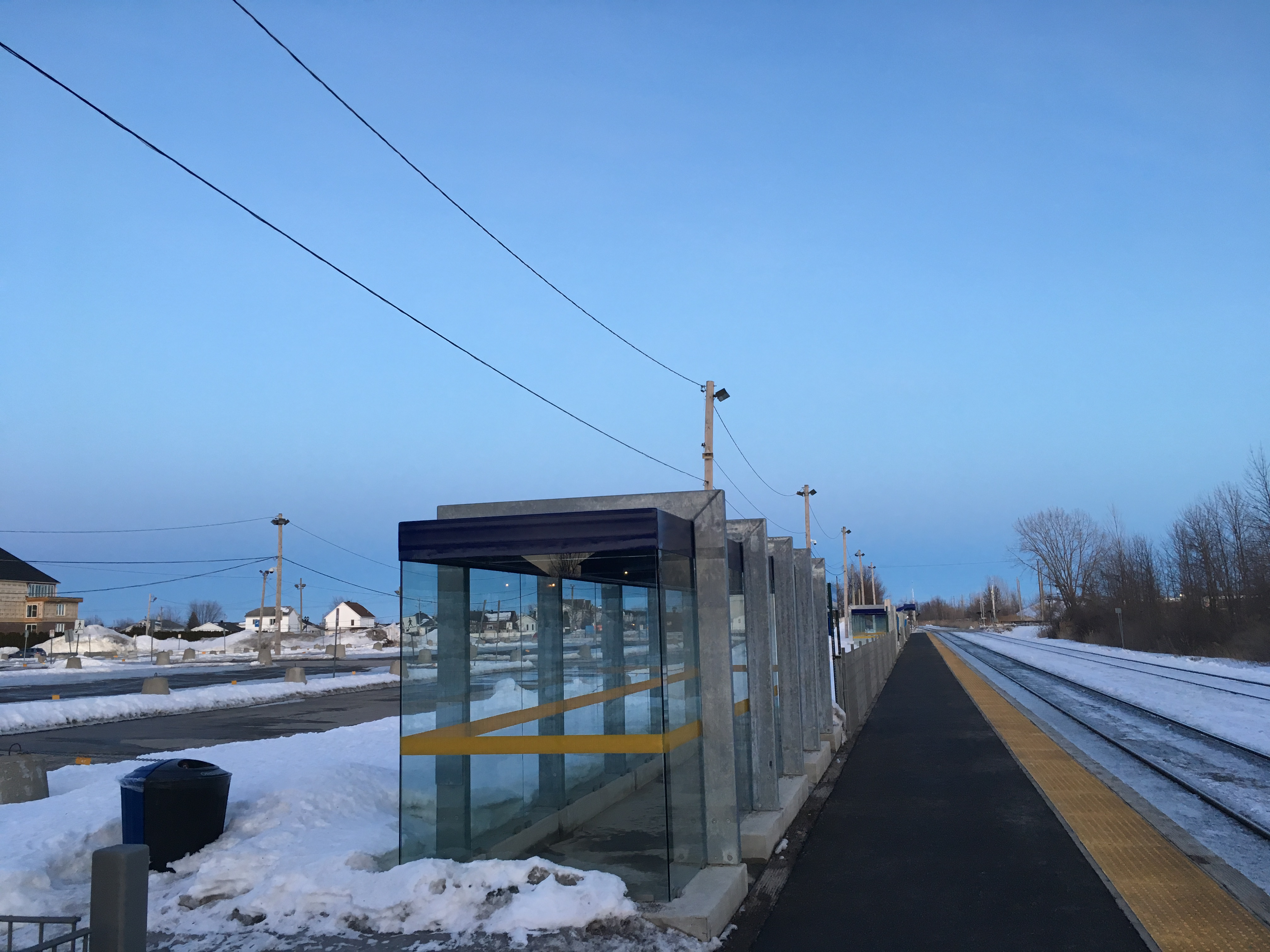

General information
- Location: 333 Sainte-Catherine Road; Saint-Constant, Quebec J5A 1V7
- Coordinates: 45°22′55″N 73°35′59″W
- Operator: Exo
- Platforms: 2 side platforms (1 in active use)
- Tracks: 2
- Connections: Exo bus services

Construction
- Parking: 824 spaces
- Cycle facilities: 30 spaces

Other information
- Fare zone: ARTM: C
- Website: Sainte-Catherine (RTM)

History
- Opened: September 4, 2001

Passengers
- 2019: 555,900

Services
Preceding station	Exo	Following station
LaSalle toward Lucien-L'Allier	Line 14 – Candiac	Saint-Constant toward Candiac
Location

Sainte-Catherine station (French pronunciation: [sɛ̃t katʁin]) is a commuter rail station operated by Exo in Saint-Constant, Quebec, Canada. It is served by the Candiac line.

== Connecting bus routes ==
Exo Richelain / Roussillon sector
No.	Route	Connects to	Service times / notes
150	Sainte-Catherine (Brébeuf - Montchamp - Gare)		Weekdays, peak only
155	Delson - Saint-Constant (Gare Sainte-Catherine)	Terminus Georges-Gagné	Weekdays only
156	Saint-Constant (Smartcentres - Monchamp - Gare)	Terminus Georges-Gagné	Weekdays only
552	Saint-Constant - Delson - Terminus Brossard	Brossard	Weekdays, peak only
