= Du Canal station =

Commuter Railway Station in Montreal

Du Canal
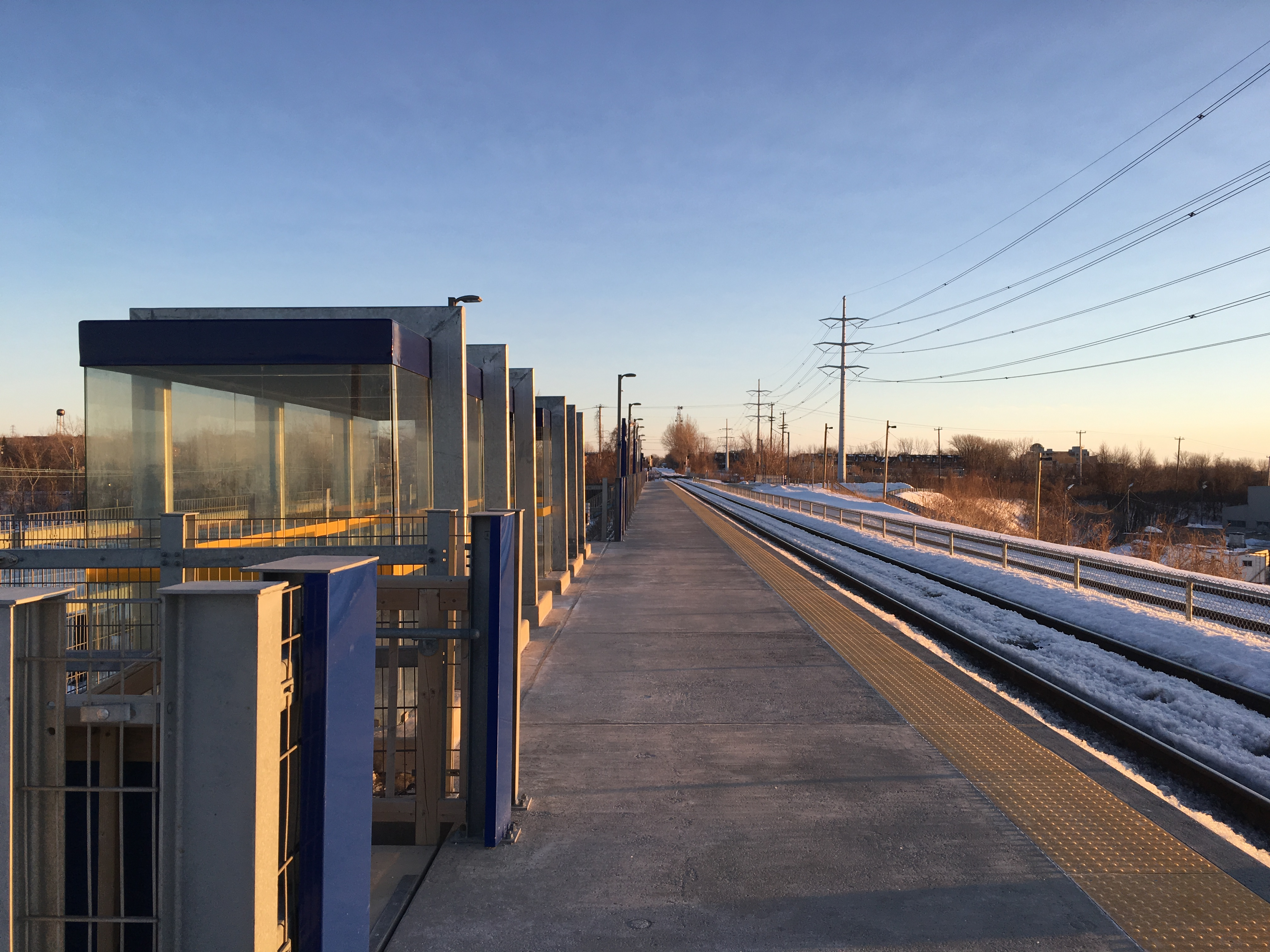

General information
- Location: 115 Saint-Joseph Blvd., Montreal, Quebec; Canada
- Coordinates: 45°26′21″N 73°39′21″W
- Operator: Exo
- Platforms: 2 side platforms
- Tracks: 2
- Connections: STM bus

Construction
- Parking: 150 places
- Cycle facilities: 14 places

Other information
- Fare zone: ARTM: A
- Website: Du Canal station (exo.quebec)

History
- Opened: January 16, 2017; 9 years ago

Passengers
- 2019: 50,900

Services
Preceding station	Exo	Following station
Montréal-Ouest toward Lucien-L'Allier	Line 14 – Candiac	LaSalle toward Candiac
Location

Du Canal station (French pronunciation: [dy kanal]) is a commuter rail station operated by Exo in the borough of Lachine in Montreal, Quebec, Canada. It is served by the Candiac line.

The station was opened as part of the strategy to reduce traffic congestion during the Turcot Interchange reconstruction.

== Connecting bus routes ==
Société de transport de Montréal
No.	Route	Connects to	Service times / notes
90	Saint-Jacques	Vendôme; Atwater	Daily
356 ☾	Lachine / YUL Aéroport / Des Sources	Frontenac; Atwater; Montréal-Ouest; Dorval; Des Sources; Sunnybrooke; Pierrefonds-Roxboro	Night service Connects to Montréal-Trudeau International Airport
