= Saint-Constant station =

Railway station in Quebec, Canada

Saint-Constant
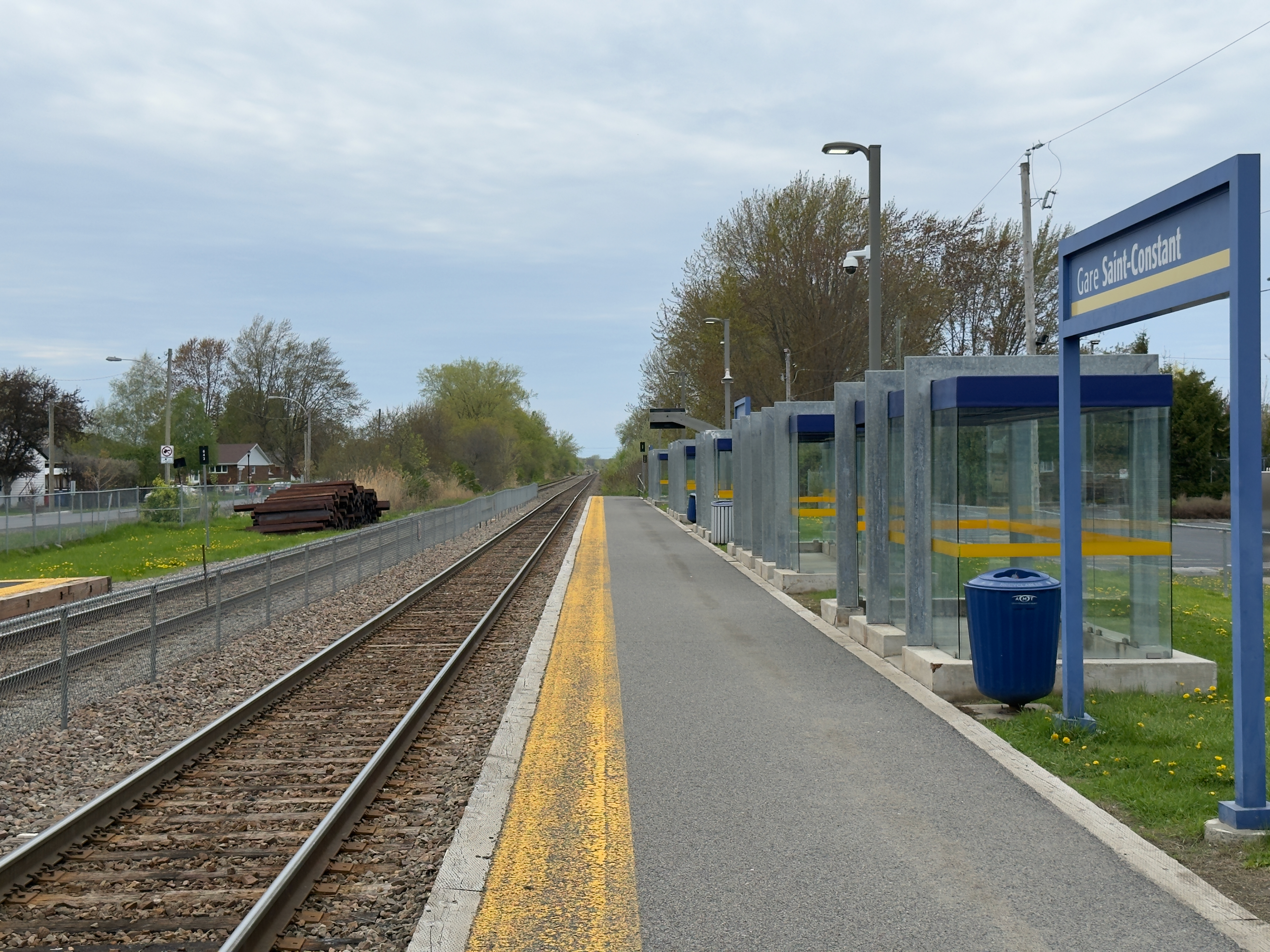
- Platform 1 at Saint-Constant station

General information
- Location: 122A Saint-Pierre Street; Saint-Constant, Quebec J5A 1H8
- Coordinates: 45°22′24″N 73°34′04″W
- Operator: Exo
- Platforms: 2 side platforms
- Tracks: 2
- Connections: Exo bus services

Construction
- Parking: 350 spaces
- Cycle facilities: 42 spaces

Other information
- Fare zone: ARTM: C
- Website: Saint-Constant (RTM)

History
- Opened: September 4, 2001

Passengers
- 2019: 302,100 (Exo)

Services
Preceding station	Exo	Following station
Sainte-Catherine toward Lucien-L'Allier	Line 14 – Candiac	Delson toward Candiac
Former services
Preceding station	Canadian Pacific Railway	Following station
Delson toward Wells River	Montreal – Wells River	Adirondack Junction toward Montreal Windsor
Delson toward McAdam	Montreal – McAdam	Adirondack Junction toward Montreal Windsor
Location

Saint-Constant station (French pronunciation: [sɛ̃ kɔ̃stɑ̃]) is a commuter rail station operated by Exo in Saint-Constant, Quebec, Canada. It is served by the Candiac line.

== Connecting bus routes ==
Exo Richelain / Roussillon sector
No.	Route	Connects to	Services times / notes
153	Saint-Constant (Saint-Pierre - Gare - Beauvais)	Terminus Georges-Gagné	Weekdays only
