= Delson station =

Railway station in Quebec, Canada

Delson
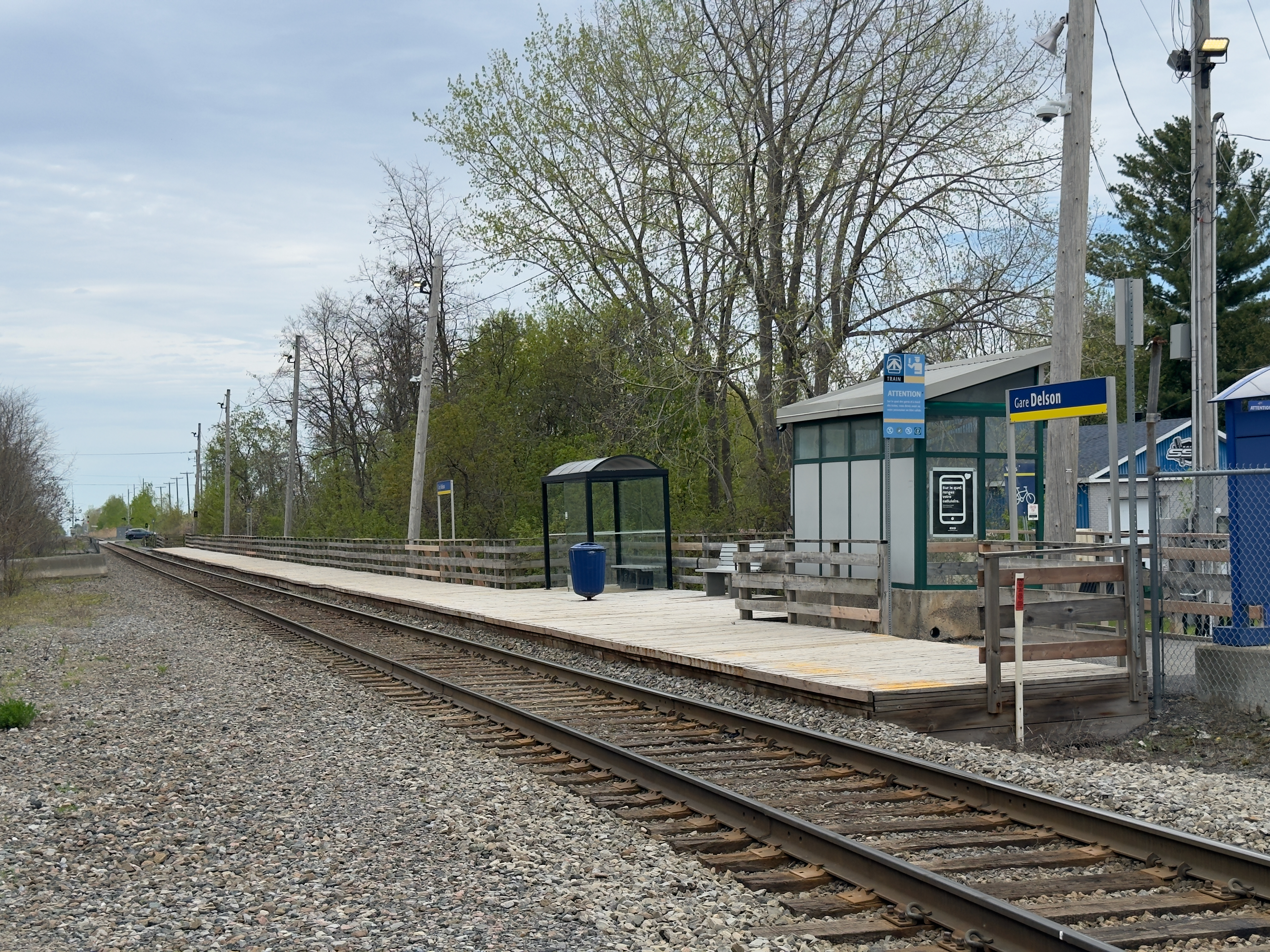
- Platform at Delson station, seen from the level crossing at rue Principale sud

General information
- Location: 1 Station Road; Delson, Quebec J5B 2A2
- Coordinates: 45°22′05″N 73°32′42″W
- Operator: Exo
- Platforms: 1 side platform
- Tracks: 1
- Connections: Exo bus services

Construction
- Parking: 106 spaces
- Cycle facilities: 7 spaces

Other information
- Fare zone: ARTM: C
- Website: Delson (RTM)

History
- Opened: September 4, 2001

Passengers
- 2019: 59,900

Services
Preceding station	Exo	Following station
Saint-Constant toward Lucien-L'Allier	Line 14 – Candiac	Candiac Terminus
Former services
Preceding station	Canadian Pacific Railway	Following station
Saint-Philippe toward Wells River	Montreal – Wells River	Saint-Constant toward Montreal Windsor
Saint-Philippe toward McAdam	Montreal – McAdam	Saint-Constant toward Montreal Windsor
Preceding station	Canadian National Railway	Following station
Saint-Constant (CN) toward Fort Covington	Montreal – Fort Covington	La Tortue toward Montreal
Preceding station	Napierville Junction Railway	Following station
Terminus	Main Line	Saint Mathieu toward Rouses Point
Location

Delson station is a commuter rail station operated by Exo in Delson, Quebec, Canada. It is served by Exo line 14 - Candiac.

== Connecting bus routes ==
Exo Richelain / Roussillon
No.	Route	Connects to	Service times / notes
152	Delson (Principale Sud - Gare)	Terminus Georges-Gagné	Weekdays only
