= Cégep André-Laurendeau =

Public college in Montreal, Quebec

Cegep André-Laurendeau
- Type: Public
- Established: 1973
- Academic affiliations: ACCC, CCAA, QSSF, AUCC
- Director: Claude Roy
- Students: 5300
- Address: 1111, rue Lapierre; Montreal, Quebec; H8N 2J4; 45°26′11″N 73°36′20″W
- Campus: Suburban
- Colours: Orange and blue
- Nickname: AL* Boomerang
- Mascot: Ideal
- Website: www.claurendeau.qc.ca

The Cégep André-Laurendeau is a public French-language college in the LaSalle borough of Montreal, Quebec, Canada. It primarily serves the southwestern areas of the city of Montreal

It is recognized for its high-quality programs. It is the only public college on the island of Montreal to offer the International Baccalaureate. The college offers 13 pre-university programs, 13 technical programs and over 15 continuing education programs. The college also has 2 research centres, it is the 4th most research-intensive college in the province of Quebec.

== History ==
The college traces its origins to the merger of several institutions which became public ones in 1967, when the Quebec system of CÉGEPs was created. Cégep André-Laurendeau was named after André Laurendeau, a novelist, playwright, essay writer, journalist and politician in Quebec, Canada.

== Programs ==
The Province of Quebec awards a Diploma of Collegial Studies for two types of programs: two years of pre-university studies or three years of vocational (technical) studies. The pre-university programs, which take two years to complete, cover the subject matters which roughly correspond to the additional year of high school given elsewhere in Canada in preparation for a chosen field in university. The technical programs, which take three-years to complete, apply to students who wish to pursue a skill trade.

== Notable figures ==
- Jean-François Belzile, philosophy professor, writer and founder of the "Ligue national d'argumentation"
- André Lamoureux, retired political science professor, political commentator and collaborator of the Huffington Post
- Alain Therrien, retired economics professor, member of the Quebec National Assembly
- Yolande Villemaire, retired French literature professor, writer and poet
- Franz Schürch, philosophy professor, writer and poet

== See also ==
- CIT Roussillon Bus No. 200 (week day bus service to the south shore)
- Higher education in Quebec
- List of colleges and universities named after people
- List of colleges in Quebec
