= Candiac line =

Commuter rail service in Greater Montreal, Quebec

Candiac
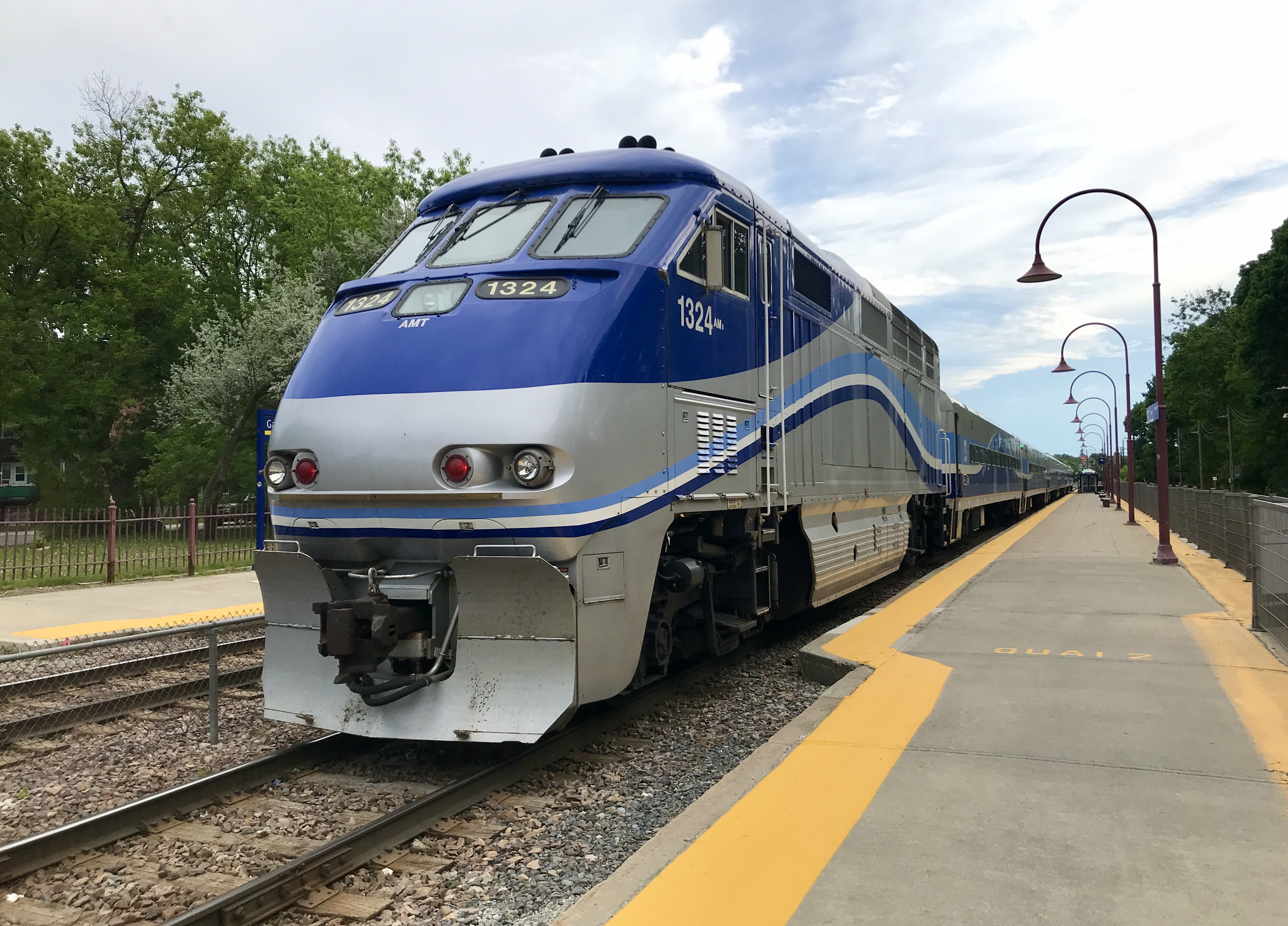
- A train at Montreal-West station

Overview
- Owner: Exo
- Line number: 14
- Locale: Greater Montreal
- Termini: Lucien-L'Allier; Candiac
- Stations: 9
- Website: Candiac line (RTM)

Service
- Type: Commuter rail
- System: Exo commuter rail
- Operator(s): Alstom
- Daily ridership: 3,739 (2025)
- Ridership: 976,120 (2025)

History
- Opened: 1887

Technical
- Line length: 25.6 km (15.9 mi)
- Track gauge: 1,435 mm (4 ft 8 1/2 in) standard gauge
- Electrification: No
- Operating speed: 60 mph (97 km/h)
Route map
Candiac line highlighted in teal

Candiac (also designated line 14, formerly known as Delson–Candiac) is a commuter rail service in Greater Montreal, Quebec. It is operated by Exo, the organization that operates the commuter rail network in Greater Montreal.

The Candiac line was originally operated by the Canadian Pacific Railway (CPR) as part of its South-Eastern railway line between Windsor Station and Farnham from 1887 until 1980. The former AMT resumed passenger service on this line in 2001, while Exo assumed current service on June 1, 2017.

There are nine inbound and nine outbound trains each weekday.

== Overview ==
This line links the Lucien-L'Allier station in downtown Montreal with Candiac, on Montreal's South Shore.

The line offers nine departures every weekday towards Montreal and nine return trips to Candiac every weekday. Most departures are during rush hour, but three are offered during off-peak hours in each direction.

== History ==
=== AMT service ===
The former Agence Métropolitaine de Transport (AMT) started service on this line on September 4, 2001, with two round trips every day. One trainset was used for both departures. In September 2003, service was increased to four round trips per day and a second trainset was used. Service was extended to Candiac in 2005, at which point the line was renamed as the Delson-Candiac line. In 2009, two additional departures were added in each direction with leased trainsets being used until new locomotives and rolling stock is received.

Service on the line was suspended from February 17 to March 9, 2006, after the derailment of six Canadian Pacific freight cars on February 17. The freight cars derailed on the Saint-Laurent Railway Bridge used by the train service. This was one of the longest disruptions in train service for the AMT. High winds were a factor in that derailment. In September 2013, CP banned AMT's multilevel coaches from the bridge during high wind conditions (85 km/h or more), deeming them potentially unstable in such conditions. After that AMT has used only its single-level 700 series coaches on this line, but has now returned to the Multilevel 3000 series coaches after the 700 series was retired.

The line was renamed on July 1, 2010, from "Delson-Candiac" to simply "Candiac" to standardize formatting across the network.

On January 16, 2017, a new station named Du Canal was opened on Saint-Joseph Boulevard in Lachine. This project was part of MTQ's mitigation measures for the reconstruction of the Turcot Interchange.

=== RTM/Exo service ===
On June 1, 2017, the AMT was dissolved and replaced by two new governing bodies, the Autorité régionale de transport métropolitain (ARTM) and the Réseau de transport métropolitain (RTM). The RTM took over all former AMT services, including this line.

In May 2018, the RTM rebranded itself as Exo, and in that process updated all line names with a number each and updated their line colours. The Candiac line became Exo 4, and its line colour was updated to a lighter pastel shade of blue. In 2023, the service was renumbered to line 14 in order to be unique within the Montreal rail network, and its line colour was changed to a pastel shade of turquoise.

== Projects ==
To improve service and attract new users on the Candiac line, the AMT had planned to carry out two major projects:

- Improving railway infrastructure on the Adirondack/Lacolle subdivision. The $20-million project included improving signaling, adding a siding for freight trains, refurbishing switches and improving pedestrian crossings. Work was scheduled to be completed by 2014.
- Building a new layover facility (overnight service and storage yard) at the end of the line. Construction was linked to the railway improvement project above.

The possibility of extending the Candiac Line another 20 kilometres beyond the new layover facility to Saint-Jean-sur-Richelieu and Saint-Philippe was also examined by the Quebec Government in 2014. In 2016, the study's final report rejected that option, citing longer travel times by train for people in the area.

== List of stations ==
These stations are on the Candiac line:

Station	Location	Connections	Zones
Lucien-L'Allier	Ville-Marie, Montreal	Lucien-L'Allier Metro station Buses	A
Vendôme	Côte-des-Neiges–Notre-Dame-de-Grâce, Montreal	Vendôme Metro station Buses	A
Montréal-Ouest	Montreal West	STM: 51, 105, 123, 162, 356	A
Du Canal	Lachine, Montreal	STM: 90, 356	A
LaSalle	LaSalle, Montreal	STM: 101, 110	A
Sainte-Catherine	Sainte-Catherine	Exo: 150, 155, 156, 552	C
Saint-Constant	Saint-Constant	Exo: 153	C
Delson	Delson	Exo: 152	C
Candiac	Candiac	Exo: 135, 146, 147	C

The commuter line operates over these Canadian Pacific Railway lines:

Subdivision	Start		End	
Westmount Subdivision	Lucien L'Allier	0.1	Montreal West	4.6
South Junction Lead	Montreal West	0.0	South Junction*	0.7
Adirondack Subdivision	South Junction*	43.9	Candiac	33.2

Note: South Junction is not a passenger stop.
