= Saint-Constant, Quebec =

Saint-Constant
- City
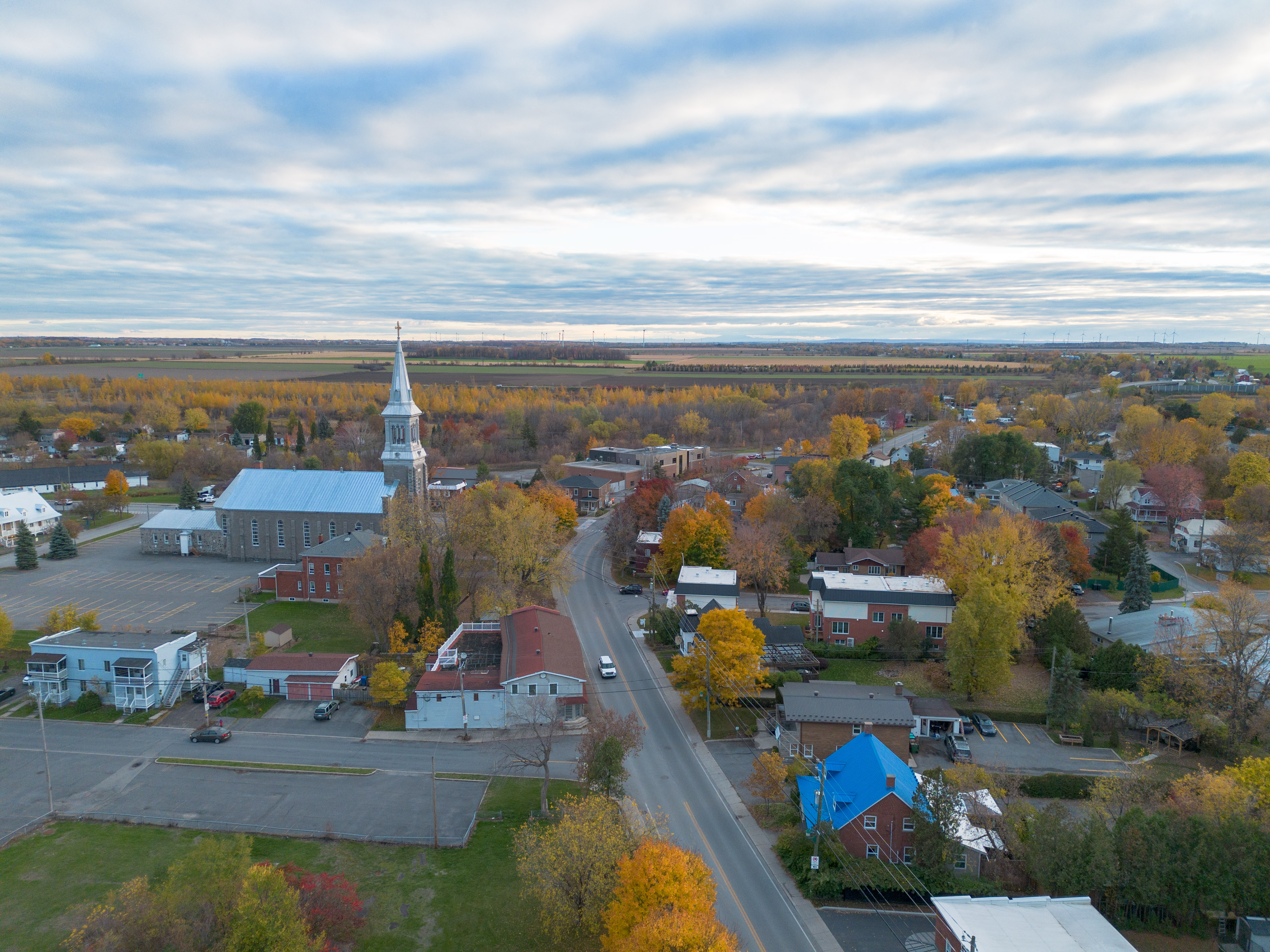
- St-Constant in 2025

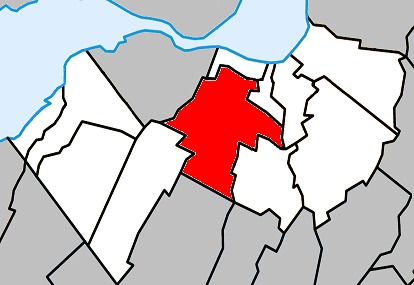
- Location within Roussillon RCM

- Location in southern Quebec
- Coordinates: 45°22′N 73°34′W
- Country: Canada
- Province: Quebec
- Region: Montérégie
- RCM: Roussillon
- Constituted: July 1, 1855

Government
  - Mayor: Jean-Claude Boyer
  - Federal riding: La Prairie
  - Prov. riding: Sanguinet

Area
  - Total: 57.12 km^{2} (22.05 sq mi)
  - Land: 57.06 km^{2} (22.03 sq mi)

Population (2021)
  - Total: 29,954
  - Density: 524.9/km^{2} (1,359/sq mi)
  - Pop (2016-21): ▲9.5%
  - Dwellings: 11,502
- Time zone: UTC−5 (EST)
  - Summer (DST): UTC−4 (EDT)
- Postal code(s): J5A
- Area codes: 450 and 579
- Highways: A-30 A-730; R-132 R-209
- Website: www.ville.saint-constant.qc.ca

Saint-Constant (French pronunciation: [sɛ̃ kɔ̃stɑ̃]) is a city in southwestern Quebec, Canada. It is located on the south shore of Montreal in the Roussillon Regional County Municipality of the Montérégie region. The population as of the Canada 2016 Census was 27,359.

== History ==
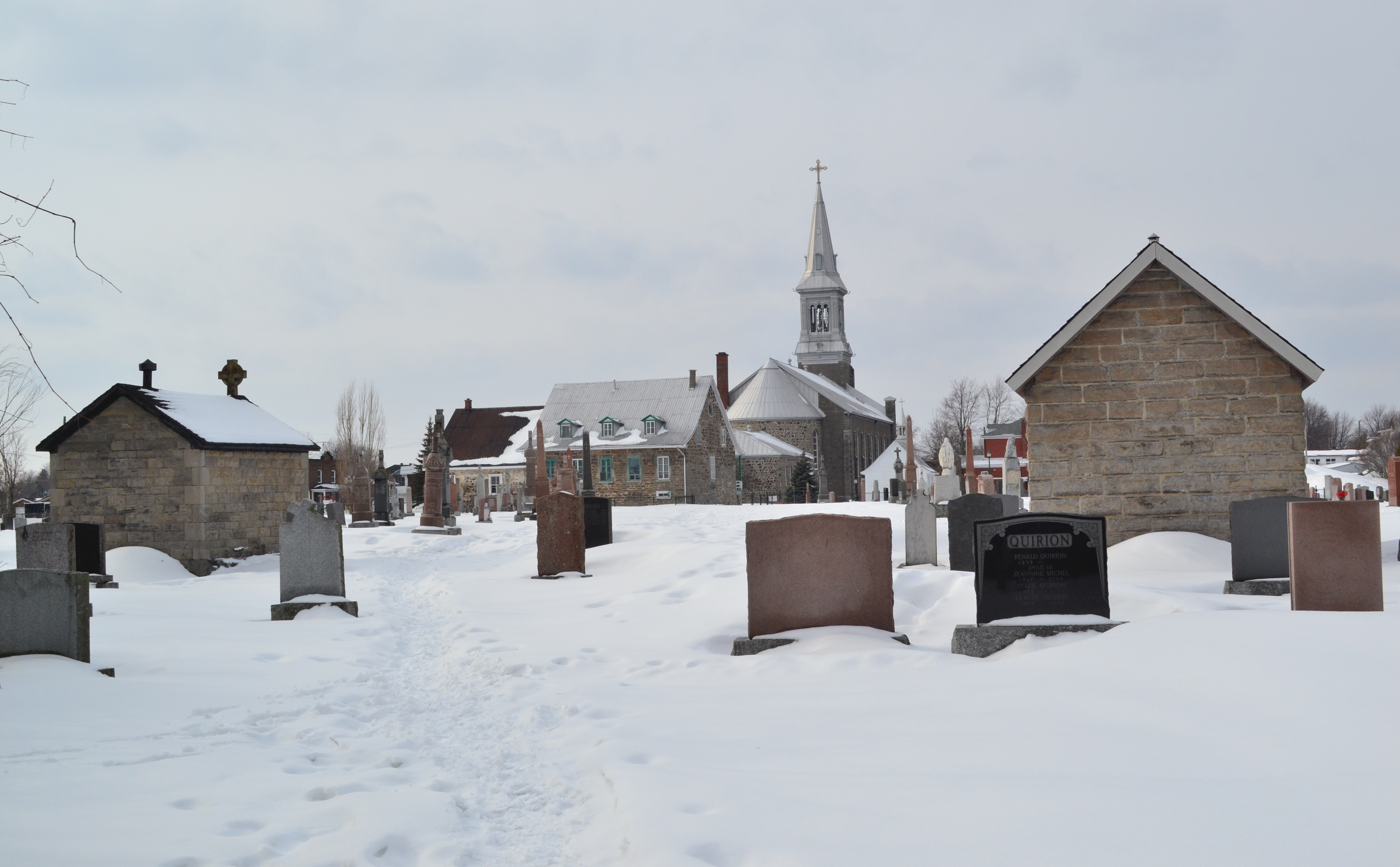
Historic presbytery of Saint-Constant

Early settlement took place in 1725 as a result of the opening of the St. Pierre concession. The Côte Saint-Pierre mission (first name of the parish) began in 1750 with the construction of a church and two years later, the parish registers opened. Rang Saint-Pierre was the central concession of the Sault-Saint-Louis seigneurie and extended into the seigneurie of LaSalle. In 1815 Rang Saint-Pierre was nicknamed "Black Cattle Road" because it was the way cattle were transported from New York to Montreal. Centrally located in what was then Laprairie County, the village of Saint-Constant was the only location of voting from 1829 to 1841. Residents of the area witnessed or took part in the Lower Canada Rebellion of 1837–1838.

Local administrative structures emerged in Saint-Constant in 1845 with the introduction of the parish municipality and the school board. However, the vast territory of the parish of Saint-Constant was already subdivided for Saint-Rémi (1840), Saint-Édouard (1833), and Saint-Isidore (1833). This trend continued with the establishment of Saint-Michel (1854), Saint-Mathieu (1919) and Sainte-Thérèse-de-Delson (1932). One of the mayors, Solime Cardinal (1815–1897), was the maternal grandfather of Charles-Émile "Charley" Trudeau, a successful French Canadian entrepreneur who became the father of Pierre Elliott Trudeau, 15th Prime Minister of Canada, and grandfather of Justin Trudeau, 23rd Prime Minister of Canada.

Saint-Constant was transformed by the construction of the Canadian National Railway and Canadian Pacific Railway in the last quarter of the nineteenth century. The electrification of the village occurred around 1918 and rural electrification was completed in 1939. The Rue Saint-Pierre was extended from Montées des Bouleaux/Rue Sainte-Catherine, in the direction of Route 132 in 1950. Starting in the 1950s, suburban development occurred in Saint-Constant, allowing it to obtain city status in 1973.

== Demographics ==
In the 2021 Census of Population conducted by Statistics Canada, Saint-Constant had a population of 29,954 living in 11,313 of its 11,502 total private dwellings, a change of 9.5% from its 2016 population of 27,359. With a land area of 57.06 km^{2} (22.03 sq mi), it had a population density of 525.0/km^{2} (1,359.6/sq mi) in 2021.

Canada census – Saint-Constant community profile

	2021	2016	2011
Population	29,954 (+9.5% from 2016)	27,359 (+9.5% from 2011)	24,980 (+4.3% from 2006)
Land area	57.06 km^{2} (22.03 sq mi)	57.13 km^{2} (22.06 sq mi)	56.83 km^{2} (21.94 sq mi)
Population density	524.9/km^{2} (1,359/sq mi)	478.9/km^{2} (1,240/sq mi)	439.5/km^{2} (1,138/sq mi)
Median age	40.0 (M: 39.6, F: 40.4)	38.8 (M: 38.4, F: 39.2)	38.0 (M: 37.7, F: 38.4)
Private dwellings	11,502 (total)	10,282 (total)	9,109 (total)
Median household income	$101,000	$86,604	$78,274

References: 2021 2016 2011

Historical Census Data - Saint-Constant, Quebec

Year	Pop.	±%
1861	2,388	—
1871	1,898	−20.5%
1881	1,722	−9.3%
1891	1,572	−8.7%
1901	1,525	−3.0%
1911	1,395	−8.5%
1921	1,411	+1.1%
1931	1,769	+25.4%

Year	Pop.	±%
1941	1,578	−10.8%
1951	1,925	+22.0%
1956	3,136	+62.9%
1961	4,108	+31.0%
1966	4,971	+21.0%
1971	5,728	+15.2%
1976	7,659	+33.7%
1981	9,938	+29.8%

Year	Pop.	±%
1986	12,508	+25.9%
1991	18,424	+47.3%
1996	21,933	+19.0%
2001	22,577	+2.9%
2006	23,957	+6.1%
2011	24,980	+4.3%
2016	27,359	+9.5%
2021	29,954	+9.5%

Source: Statistics Canada

Canada Census Mother Tongue - Saint-Constant, Quebec
Census	Total	French			English			French & English			Other		
Year	Responses	Count	Trend	Pop %	Count	Trend	Pop %	Count	Trend	Pop %	Count	Trend	Pop %
2021	29,885	23,230	▲1.4%	77.8%	1,700	▲18.9%	5.7%	525	▲59.1%	1.8%	3,865	▲64.1%	12.9%
2016	26,695	22,905	▲5.6%	85.8%	1,430	▲13.9%	5.4%	330	▲29.4%	1.2%	2,355	▲56.0%	8.8%
2011	24,705	21,685	▼0.3%	87.8%	1,255	▲17.3%	5.1%	255	▲96.2%	1.0%	1,510	▲67.8%	6.1%
2006	23,850	21,750	▲6.2%	91.2%	1,070	▼3.6%	4.5%	130	▲8.3%	0.6%	900	▲15.4%	3.8%
2001	22,490	20,480	▲3.7%	91.1%	1,110	▲7.8%	4.9%	120	▼38.5%	0.5%	780	▼14.8%	3.5%
1996	21,885	19,745	n/a	90.2%	1,030	n/a	4.7%	195	n/a	0.9%	915	n/a	4.2%

== Attractions ==
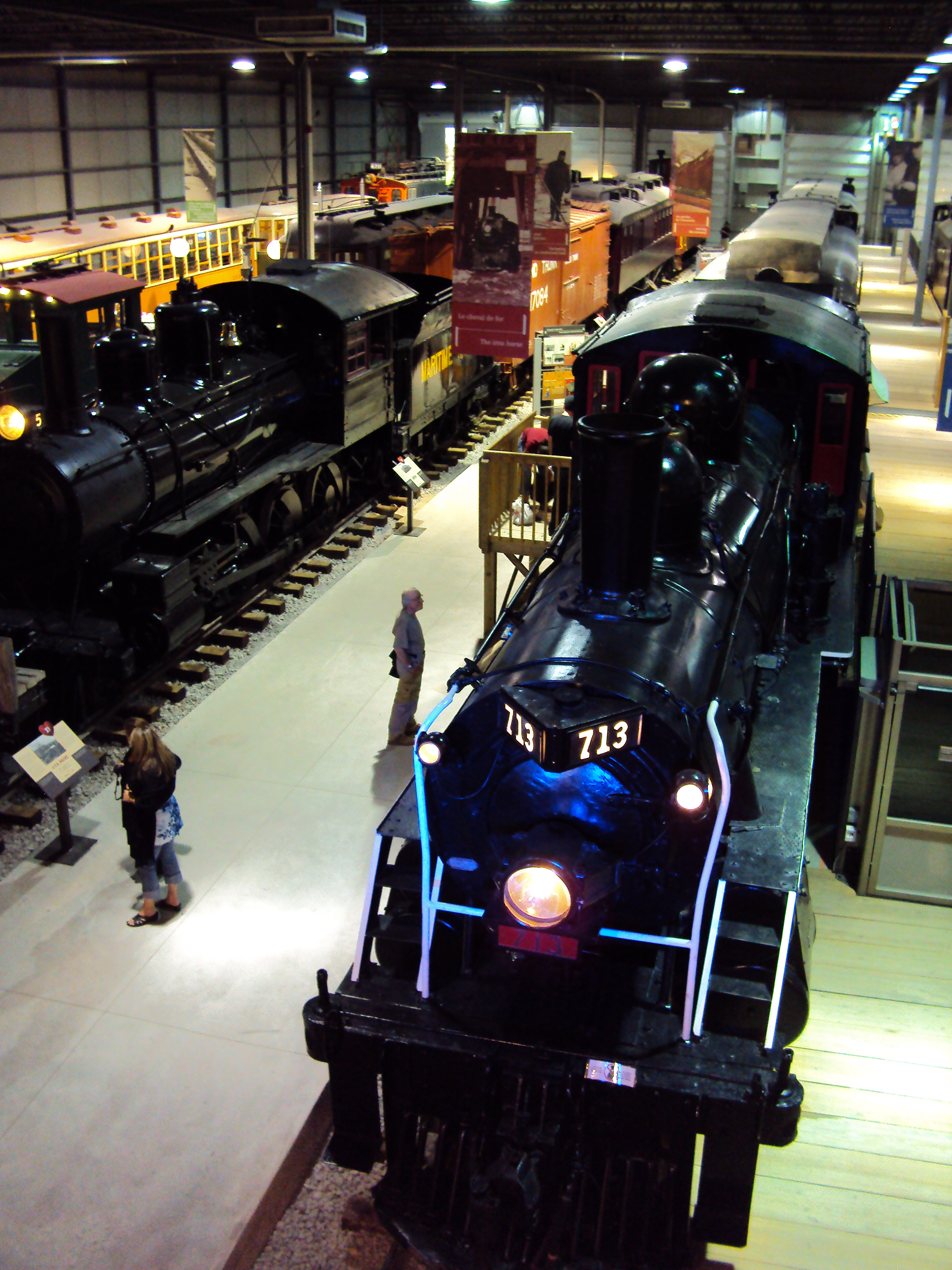
Canadian Railway Museum

Saint-Constant is home to the Canadian Railway Museum.

== Government ==
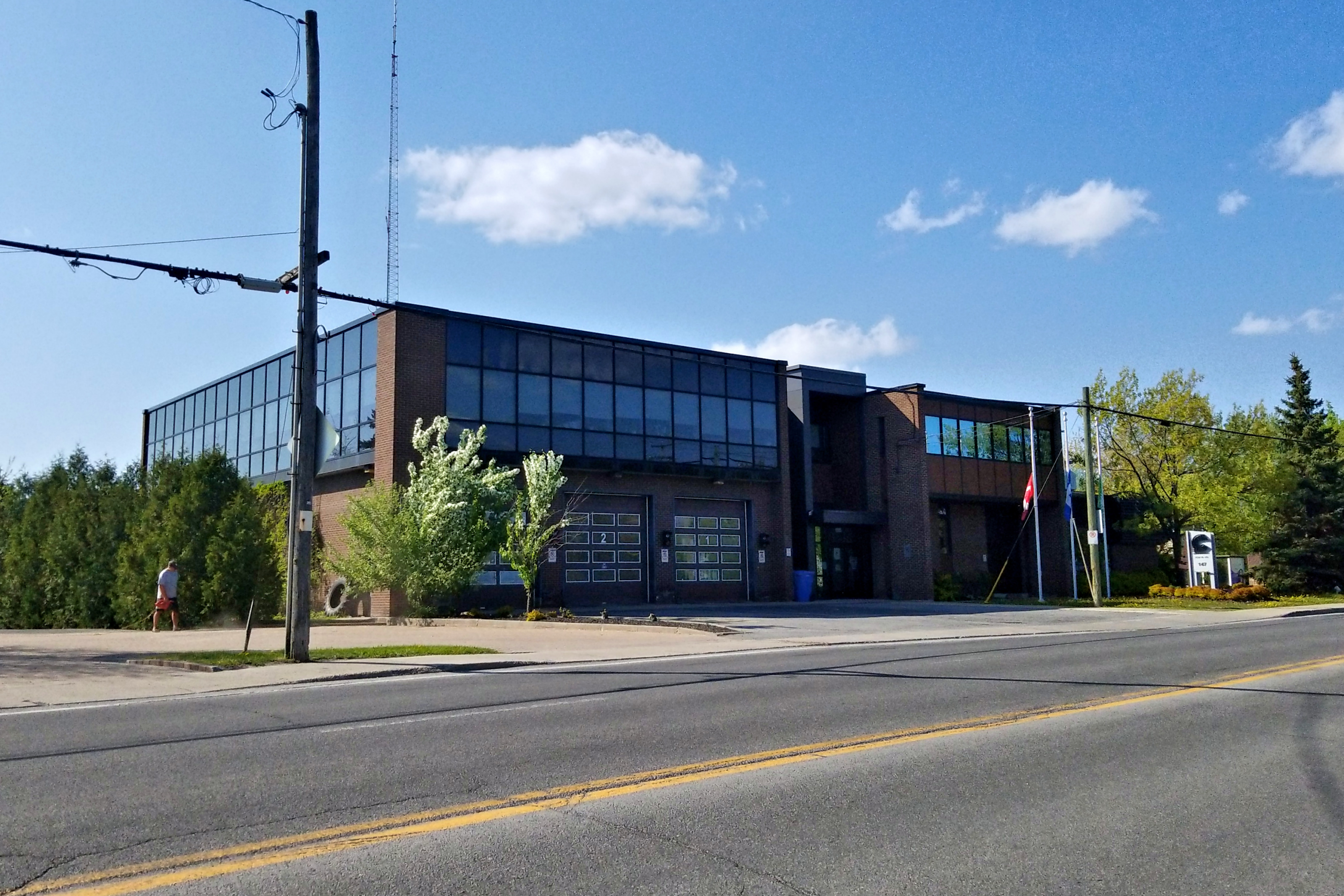
City hall of Saint-Constant

List of former mayors:

- Daniel Ashby (...–2005)
- Gilles Pépin (2005–2013)
- Jean-Claude Boyer (2013–present)

== Infrastructure ==
Local bus service in Saint-Constant is provided by the Réseau de transport métropolitain's Roussillon sector. Saint-Constant is also served by the Saint-Constant and Sainte-Catherine stations on the Réseau de transport métropolitain's Candiac line.

== See also ==
- Saint-Regis River
- List of cities in Quebec
