= Candiac station =

Railway station in Candiac, Quebec, Canada

Candiac
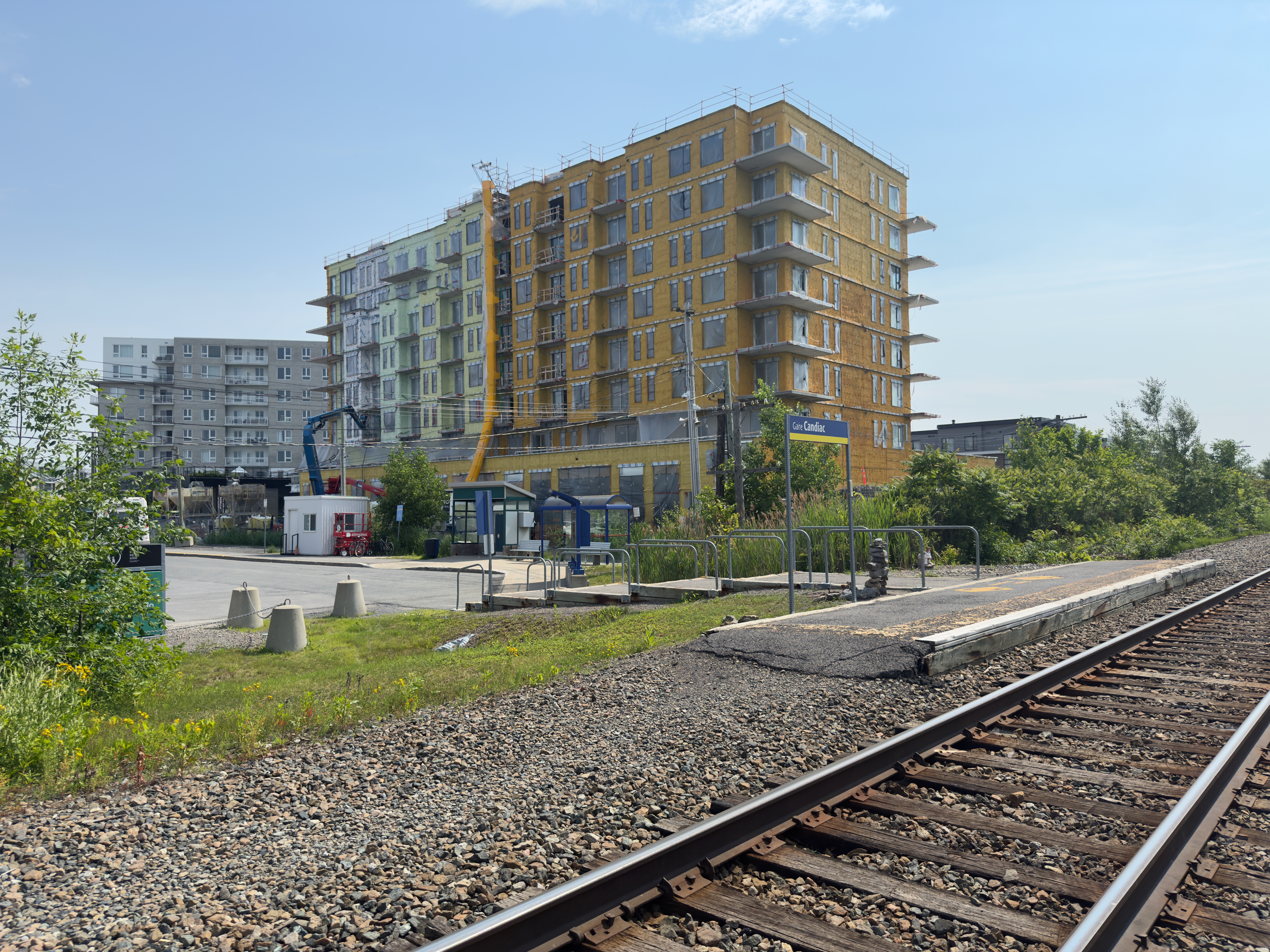
- Station platform, with shelter, park and ride, and new TOD apartments being built in the background

General information
- Location: 201 Sorbonne Street; Candiac, Quebec J5R 0B2
- Coordinates: 45°21′39″N 73°30′53″W
- Operator: Exo
- Platforms: 1 side platform
- Tracks: 1
- Connections: Exo bus services

Construction
- Parking: 343 spaces
- Cycle facilities: 7 spaces
- Accessible: No

Other information
- Fare zone: ARTM: C
- Website: Candiac (Exo)

History
- Opened: January 31, 2005

Passengers
- 2019: 142,000

Services
Preceding station	Exo	Following station
Delson toward Lucien-L'Allier	Line 14 – Candiac	Terminus
Location

Candiac station is a commuter rail station operated by Exo in Candiac, Quebec, Canada.

It is the outbound terminus of the Exo line 13 - Candiac. The platform is only 10 metres (30 ft) long, requiring selective door operation.

== History ==
It was announced in 2004 that the Agence métropolitaine de transport (AMT) would extend the Delson commuter line to Candiac. On April 11, 2005 the station was inaugurated with two morning departures and two evening arrivals on weekdays.

In 2019 the city of Candiac announced that the vacant land surrounding the station was selected by the Montreal Metropolitan Community to pilot a transit-oriented development project.

== Connecting bus routes ==
Exo Richelain / Roussillon
No.	Route	Connects to	Services times / notes
135	Taxi collectif Saint-Philippe - Candiac (Gare)		Weekdays, peak only
146	Candiac (Deauville - Carrefour - Gare)	Terminus Montcalm-Candiac	Weekdays only
147	Candiac (Barcelone - Carrefour - Gare)	Terminus Montcalm-Candiac	Weekdays only
