= Lucien-L'Allier station (Exo) =

Railway station in Montreal, Quebec, Canada

Lucien-L'Allier
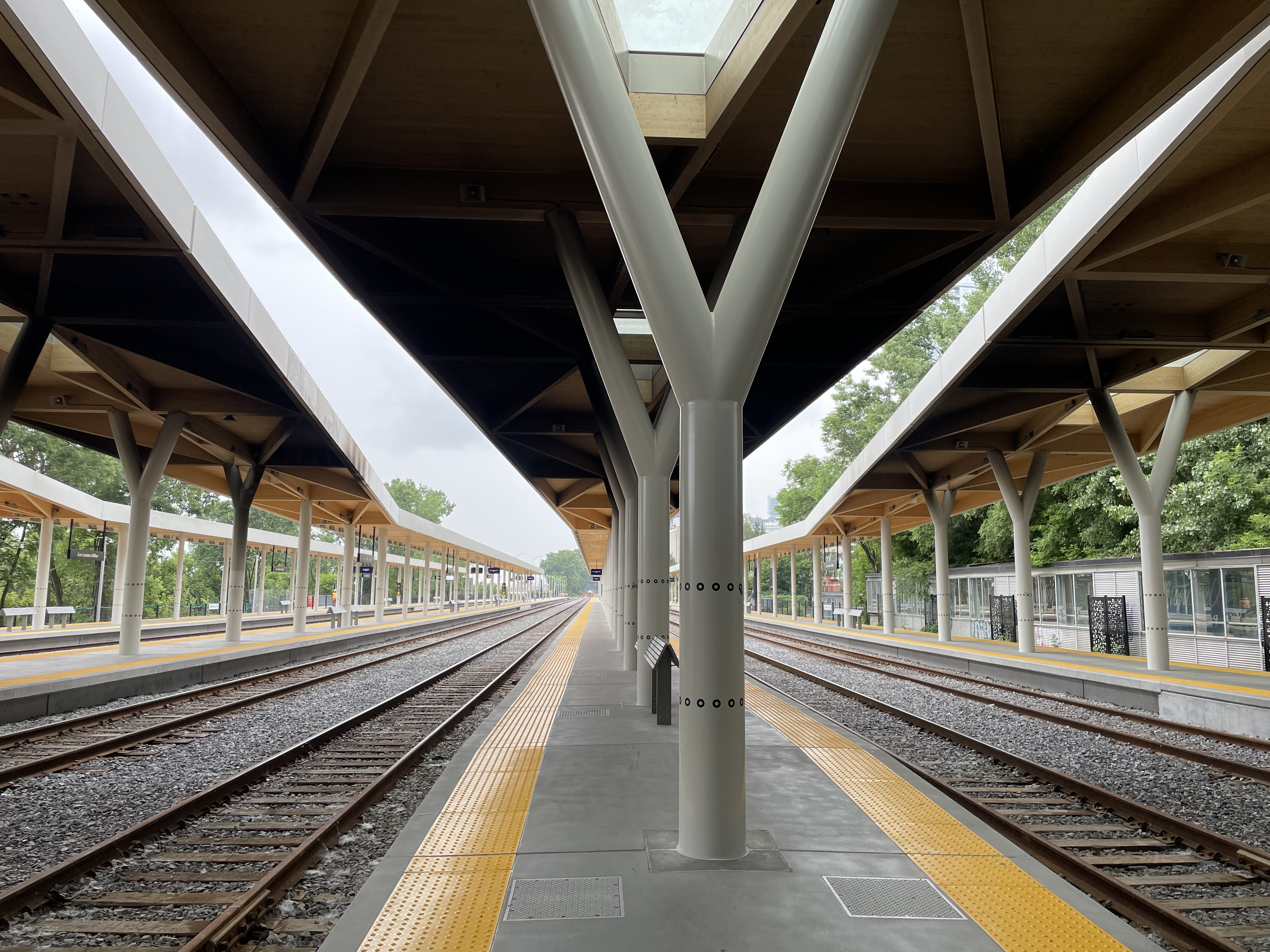
- Boarding area after renovation.

General information
- Location: 1290 Montreal Canadiens Avenue; Montreal, Quebec H3B 2S2; Canada
- Coordinates: 45°29′43″N 73°34′11″W
- Operator: Exo
- Platforms: 4 island platforms
- Tracks: 8
- Connections: Lucien-L'Allier; STM bus

Construction
- Parking: None
- Cycle facilities: None
- Accessible: Platforms only, trains not accessible

Other information
- Fare zone: ARTM: A

History
- Opened: January 18, 1997

Passengers
- 2019: Vaudreuil-Hudson: 2,072,400; Saint-Jérôme: 751,300; Candiac: 598,800; Total: 3,422,500

Services
Preceding station	Exo	Following station
Vendôme toward Hudson	Line 11 – Vaudreuil–Hudson	Terminus
Vendôme toward Saint-Jérôme	Line 12 – Saint-Jérôme	Terminus
Vendôme toward Candiac	Line 14 – Candiac	Terminus
Track layout
Location

Lucien-L'Allier station (French pronunciation: [lysjɛ̃ lalje]) is a commuter rail terminal in Montreal, Quebec, Canada. It is the terminal for Exo's Vaudreuil-Hudson, Saint-Jérôme, and Candiac lines. Lucien-L'Allier is in ARTM fare zone A. It is one of the two downtown terminals for Montreal commuter trains, the other being Montreal Central Station.

== Origin of name ==
Lucien L'Allier station takes its name from the nearby Lucien L'Allier Montreal Metro station. This station is in turn named for rue Lucien-L'Allier, the original name of which, rue de l'Aqueduc, was changed in order to commemorate Lucien L'Allier, chief engineer for the initial network of the Montreal Metro and for the construction of Saint Helen's Island and Île Notre-Dame for Expo 67.

Originally, the terminus of the commuter rail line was the monumental Windsor Station (Gare Windsor), which was also the headquarters of Canadian Pacific Railway until it moved to Calgary in 1996. This station was separated from the rails by the construction of the Molson Centre (now Bell Centre), which integrated a new commuter railway terminal. Originally called Terminus Windsor, this new terminal was renamed Gare Lucien-L'Allier to reduce confusion with the original Windsor Station, which still exists but is no longer a railway station.

== Station closure and repairs ==
On February 12, 2024, Exo announced that this station would be closed starting April 1, 2024, for repair works to bring it up to modern standards. The existing platforms were repaired and canopies added above them. Following the closure, the Vaudreuil-Hudson, Saint-Jérôme, and Candiac lines were affected. The Vaudreuil-Hudson and Candiac lines shortened service to Vendôme station, whereas service on the Saint-Jérôme line was shortened to Parc station, although some trains continued on to Montréal-Ouest station.

Service to Lucien L'Allier Station resumed on December 21, 2024, for the Vaudreuil-Hudson line and December 23, 2024, for the Saint-Jérôme and Candiac lines.

== Location ==
The station is located at 1290 Avenue des Canadiens-de-Montréal (the street was formerly called Rue de la Gauchetière), near the historic Windsor Station, and is connected by an enclosed walkway to Lucien-L'Allier Metro station.

Terminus Lucien-L'Allier is the eastern end of the Canadian Pacific Railway's Westmount Subdivision.

== Connections ==
=== STM bus routes ===
For STM bus routes accessible from this station, see Lucien-L'Allier station (Montreal Metro).

=== Metro stations ===
- Lucien-L'Allier (Orange Line)
