= Exo commuter rail =

Commuter rail system in Greater Montreal, Quebec

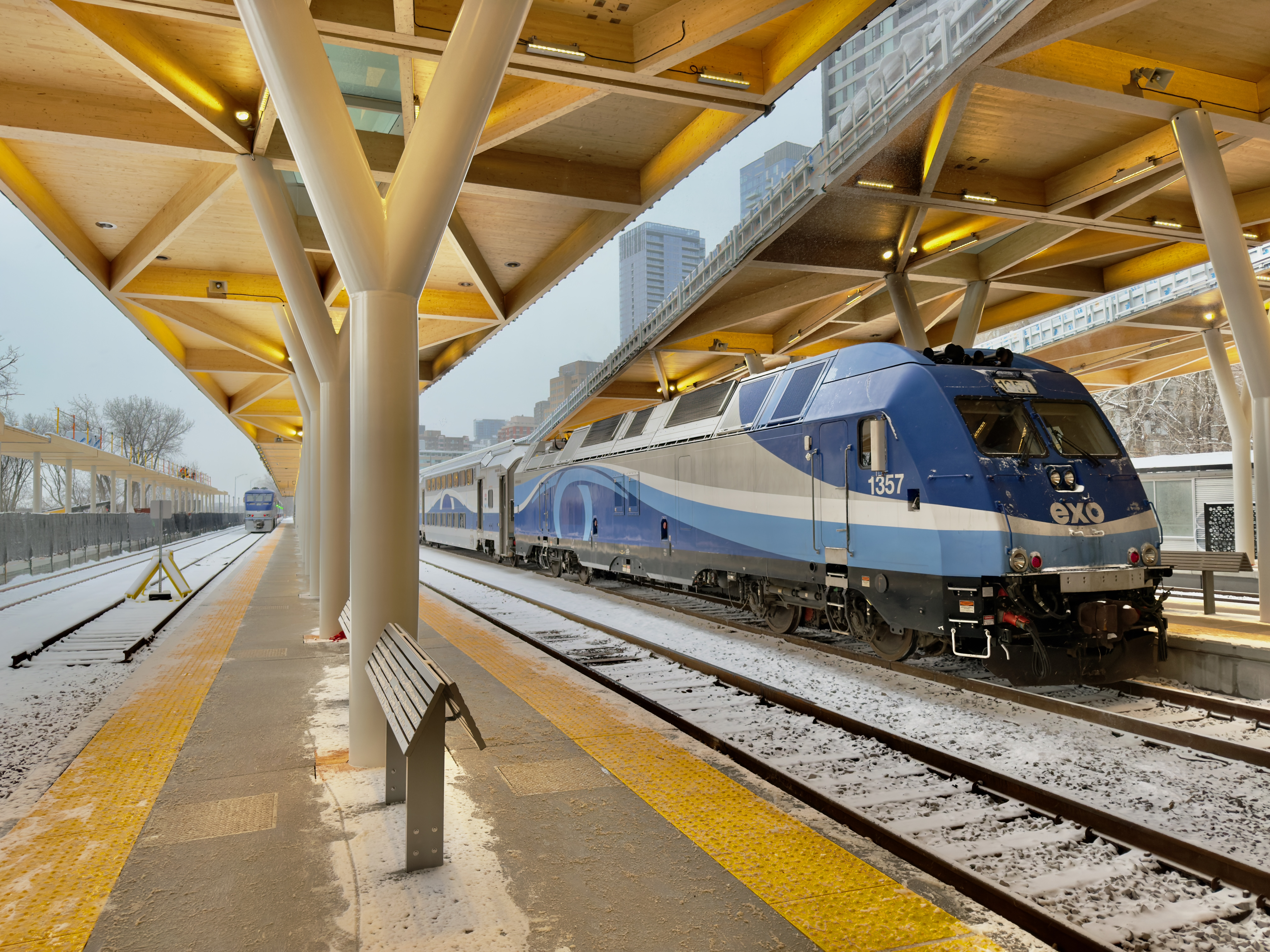
- Platform and wooden canopy, with a train stationed, at Lucien-L'Allier station

Overview
- Owner: Exo
- Locale: Greater Montreal
- Transit type: Commuter rail
- Number of lines: 5
- Line number: Line 11 – Vaudreuil–Hudson; Line 12 – Saint-Jérôme; Line 13 – Mont-Saint-Hilaire; Line 14 – Candiac; Line 15 – Mascouche
- Number of stations: 53
- Daily ridership: 30,600 (2025)
- Annual ridership: 7,986,685 (2025)
- Website: exo.quebec

Operation
- Began operation: 1859 (first section); January 1, 1996 (as AMT); June 1, 2017 (as Réseau de transport métropolitain, later Exo)
- Operator: Alstom
- Reporting marks: EXOX, AMXX
- Infrastructure managers: Canadian National Railway; Canadian Pacific Kansas City; Réseau de transport métropolitain; Infra RAIL (CDPQ Infra)
- Number of vehicles: 41 locomotives; 206 coaches

Technical
- System length: 225.7 kilometres (140.2 mi)
System map
Key

Exo commuter rail (reporting marks EXOX, AMXX) is a system of five radial commuter rail services serving the Greater Montreal area. The network is operated by Alstom using trackage owned by Exo, the Canadian National Railway (CN), and Canadian Pacific Kansas City (CPKC).

Exo's commuter trains are its highest-profile division. It uses diesel-electric push-pull trains. The Mont-Saint-Hilaire and Mascouche lines run on CN trackage, while the Vaudreuil–Hudson, Saint-Jérôme, and Candiac lines run on CPKC trackage and operate out of Lucien L'Allier terminus. The Saint-Jérôme line also runs on Exo's own trackage between Sainte-Thérèse and Saint-Jérôme, as does the Mascouche line between Repentigny and Mascouche and the Vaudreuil–Hudson line between Vaudreuil and Hudson.

Operation of all commuter rail was provided by contract to CN and CP (on their respective rail networks) until June 30, 2017. Operations were taken over by Alstom (then Bombardier Transportation) beginning July 1, 2017, on an 8-year contract. In March 2026, operations of the commuter rail will be awarded to Transdev Canada, starting July 1, 2027, on a ten year contract.

The train lines are part of Greater Montreal's integrated public transit network including bus, regional rail (REM) and Metro, coordinated by the Autorité régionale de transport métropolitain (ARTM). Many train stations serve local bus terminals, and a few provide connections to Metro, REM and Via Rail and Amtrak national rail services.

== History ==
=== Takeover from private rail operators ===
Canadian National (CN) and Canadian Pacific (CP) had long operated commuter trains in the Montreal area, but by the 1980s, their services had dwindled to one route each. The Commission de transport de la communauté de Montréal (CTCUM, predecessor of the STM), which already managed Metro and bus services across the Island of Montreal, assumed management of CN's Deux-Montagnes commuter service and CP's Rigaud service in 1982 as the two railways began scaling back their services.

In 1997, management and financing of both lines was transferred to the newly created Agence métropolitaine de transport (AMT), which had been established to distribute funding and coordinate transportation planning among the numerous transit operators throughout the Greater Montreal Region.

=== Service expansion ===
Later that year, the AMT inaugurated service between Blainville and Jean-Talon (now Parc) train station in Montreal's Park Extension district. Originally, the service was designed to provide a temporary alternative for motorists from Laval and the North Shore of Montreal, while the Highway 117 Dufresne Bridge was being repaired. The service proved to be so popular that the AMT continued to fund it, and even extended a number of trains to the Lucien-L'Allier station downtown in 1999, and continues to provide off-peak daytime weekday service on this line. The service was extended further north to Saint-Jérôme in January 2007.

In 2000, the AMT inaugurated its service to McMasterville, and later extended it to Mont-Saint-Hilaire in September 2002.

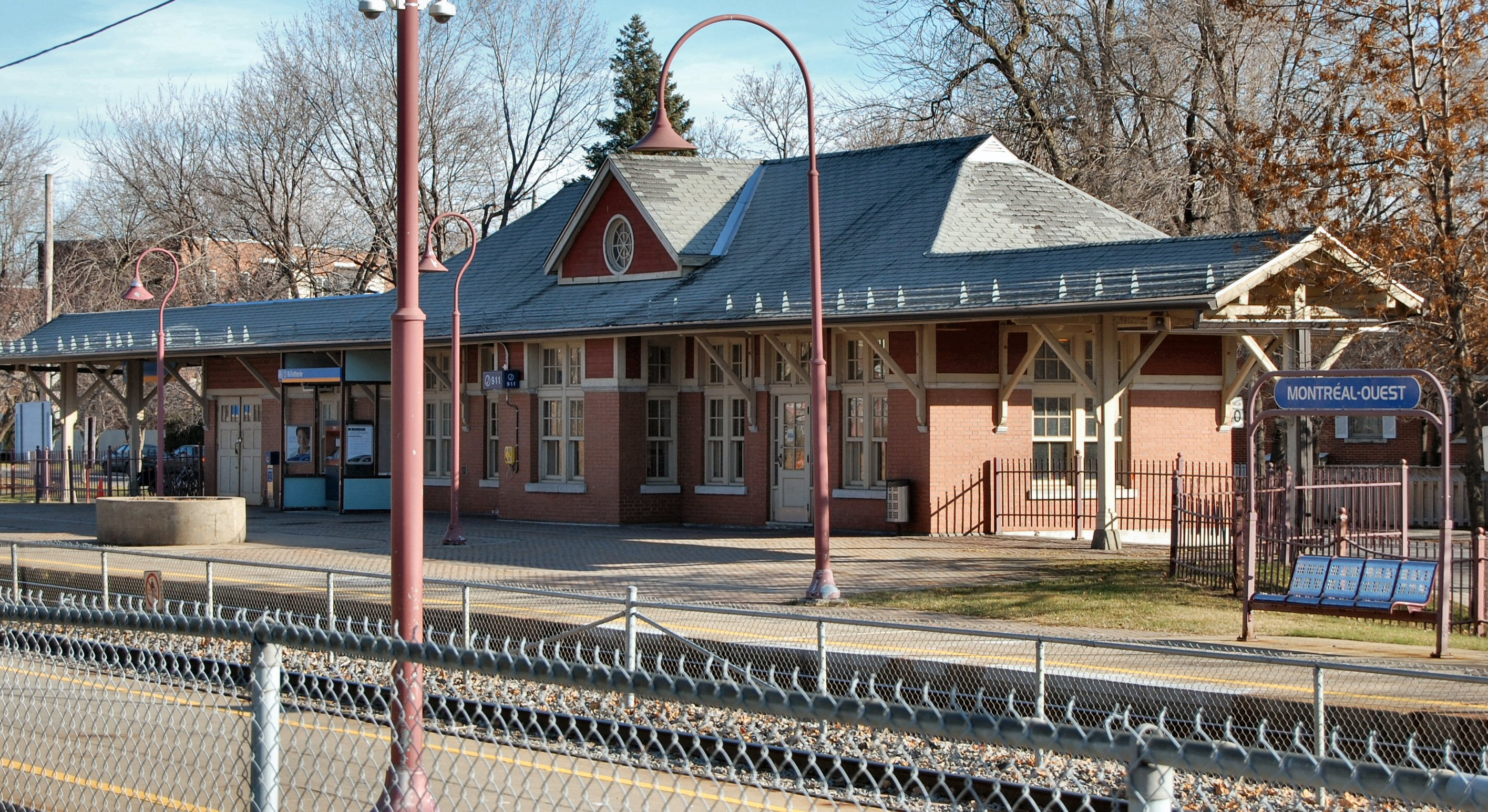
Montréal-Ouest station in Montreal West

In 2001, the AMT initiated a pilot project, launching service on a fifth line to Delson. This was later extended to Candiac in 2005.

A new Train de l'Est (East Train) line to Mascouche was announced by the Quebec government in March 2006. After delays and cost overruns, it started service in December 2014.

In 2014, the AMT acquired the entire Deux-Montagnes line from CN, including the right of way, infrastructure, trackage, other railway equipment, grounds, curb lanes, rights in the Mount Royal tunnel and air rights, in a $97 million transaction.

=== Creation of Exo ===
On June 1, 2017, the AMT was disbanded in a reorganization of metropolitan transit authorities. A new agency, the Réseau de transport métropolitain (RTM) was created to be responsible for operating commuter rail and suburban transit services. In May 2018, the RTM adopted the Exo brand (stylized exo, all-lowercase), to represent the sub- and exurban nature of its service area.

In 2019, Exo proceeded to rebrand all of its lines with numbers in the format "exo1", "exo2", etc. When the ARTM launched its new metropolitan signage in 2023, Exo renumbered the lines again starting at "11". It also adopted a new logo for train service in a distinctive colour to differentiate from other rapid transit services, rolling out progressively on signage since 2020.

Evolution of the Montreal suburban rail network logo
Logo used by the CTCUM and STCUM until 1997

Logo used by the AMT from 1997 until 2020

Logo used by Exo as of 2020, part of the ARTM's uniform metropolitan signage

=== Alignment with the REM ===
The construction of the Réseau express métropolitain (REM) initially led to the closure of the Mount Royal Tunnel in May 2020, causing the Deux-Montagnes line to terminate at Bois-Franc station. From that point, most trains on the Mascouche line terminated at Ahuntsic station, with transfer to the metro possible at Sauvé, and certain rush hour trains were rerouted around the western end of Montreal in order to reach Central Station from the south. On December 31, 2020, the Deux-Montagnes line was closed permanently for conversion to the REM.

The REM includes a station built as a new terminus for the Mascouche line, at Côte-de-Liesse, allowing access to downtown via transfer to the REM. The REM station entered service on November 17, 2025, and the Exo station opened on January 12, 2026, at which point service to Central Station was discontinued.

In May 2023, Exo announced that Lucien-L'Allier terminal would be closed starting April 2024 to rebuild the platforms and add a canopy. Trains on the Candiac, Vaudreuil-Hudson and Saint-Jérôme lines would terminate at Vendôme. Service to Lucien-L'Allier resumed on December 21, 2024, for the Vaudreuil-Hudson line and December 23, 2024, for the Saint-Jérôme and Candiac lines.

== Lines ==
Commuter train lines
Train lines	Line length	Dates of service			Trains per day			Outbound terminus			Inbound terminus		Ref
Train lines	Line length	Begun	Discontinued	Resumed	M–F	Sat.	Sun.	Extended service	Regular service	Short turn service	Regular service	Short turn service	Ref
Vaudreuil–Hudson	51.2 km (31.8 mi)	1887			14 out, 13 in	4	3	Hudson (3/weekday)	Vaudreuil	Beaconsfield (1/weekday)	Lucien-L'Allier		
Saint-Jérôme	62.8 km (39.0 mi)	1882	1980	1997	14	6	6	Saint-Jérôme			Lucien-L'Allier	Parc (3/weekday); De la Concorde (weekends)	
Mont-Saint-Hilaire	34.9 km (21.7 mi)	1859	1988	2000	7	0	0	Mont-Saint-Hilaire			Gare Centrale		
Candiac	25.6 km (15.9 mi)	1887	1981	2001	9	0	0	Candiac			Lucien-L'Allier		
Mascouche	44 km (27 mi)	1945	1969	2014	8	0	0	Mascouche			Côte-de-Liesse		

== Fares ==
As of July 1, 2026

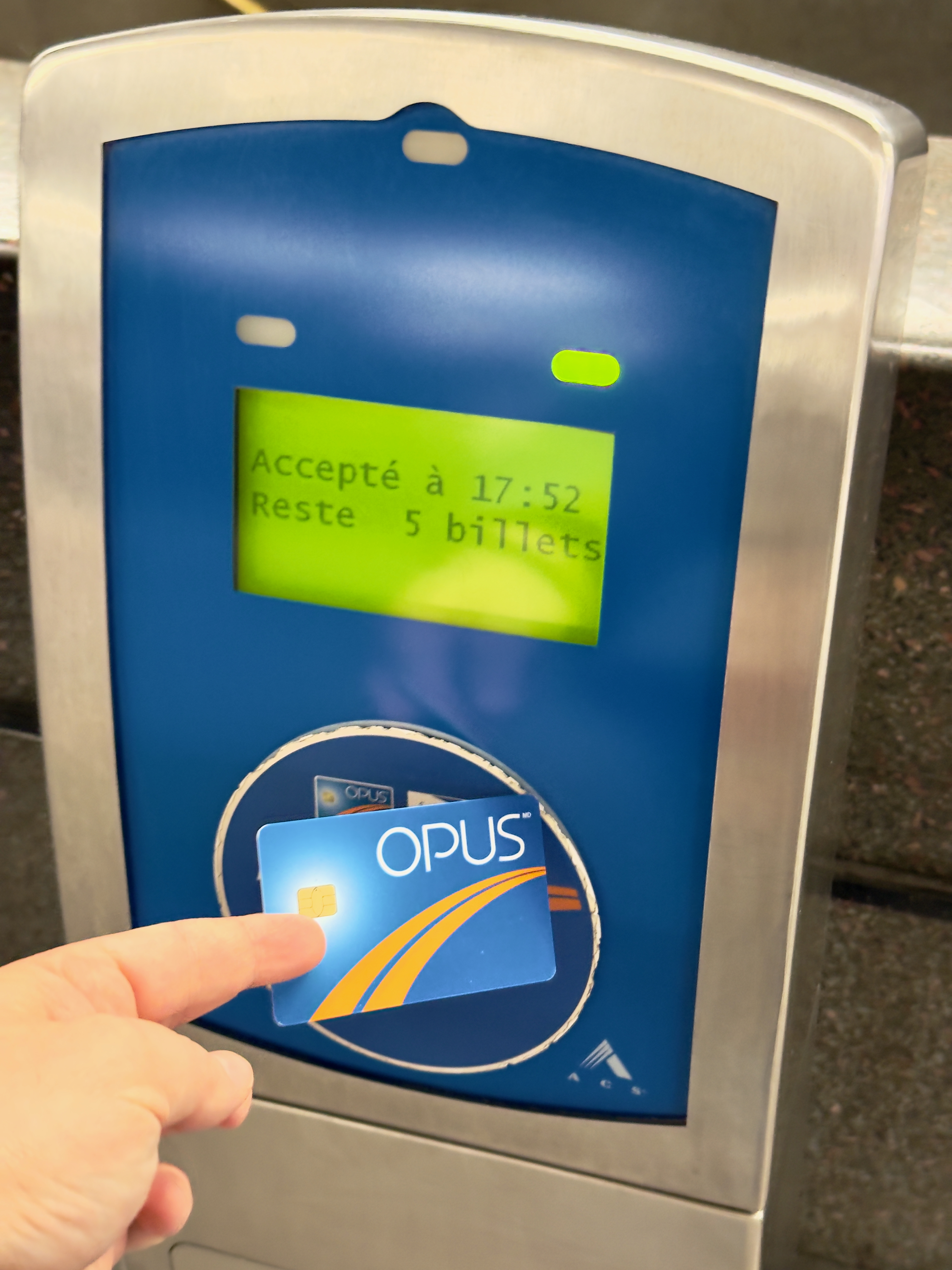
Close-up of a passenger validating their Opus card on a ticket validator, at the concourse of Montreal Central station.

Exo services operate within the Autorité régionale de transport métropolitain (ARTM)'s integrated fare structure for Greater Montreal. Trains on the network operate within fare zones A, B and C. All Modes fares include passage on the commuter rail network, as well as bus, metro and the Réseau express métropolitain. Train-specific fares were retired in July 2025.

There are no fare gates at train stations. Instead, a proof-of-payment system is used, where riders are expected to validate their ticket on the platform. Fare inspectors randomly check tickets. Tickets and passes are now sold by automated vending machines at stations, either onto an Opus card or a cardboard Occassionel card.

=== Funding ===
Financing for the rail network's operations (including maintenance, rolling stock, equipment and salaries) is handled by Exo, which is funded primarily by the Agence régionale du transport métropolitain.

== Rolling stock ==
Exo has a variety of rolling stock, some of it acquired from GO Transit, the rest built specifically for it. There are a total of 256 cars and locomotives in the fleet.

=== Locomotives ===
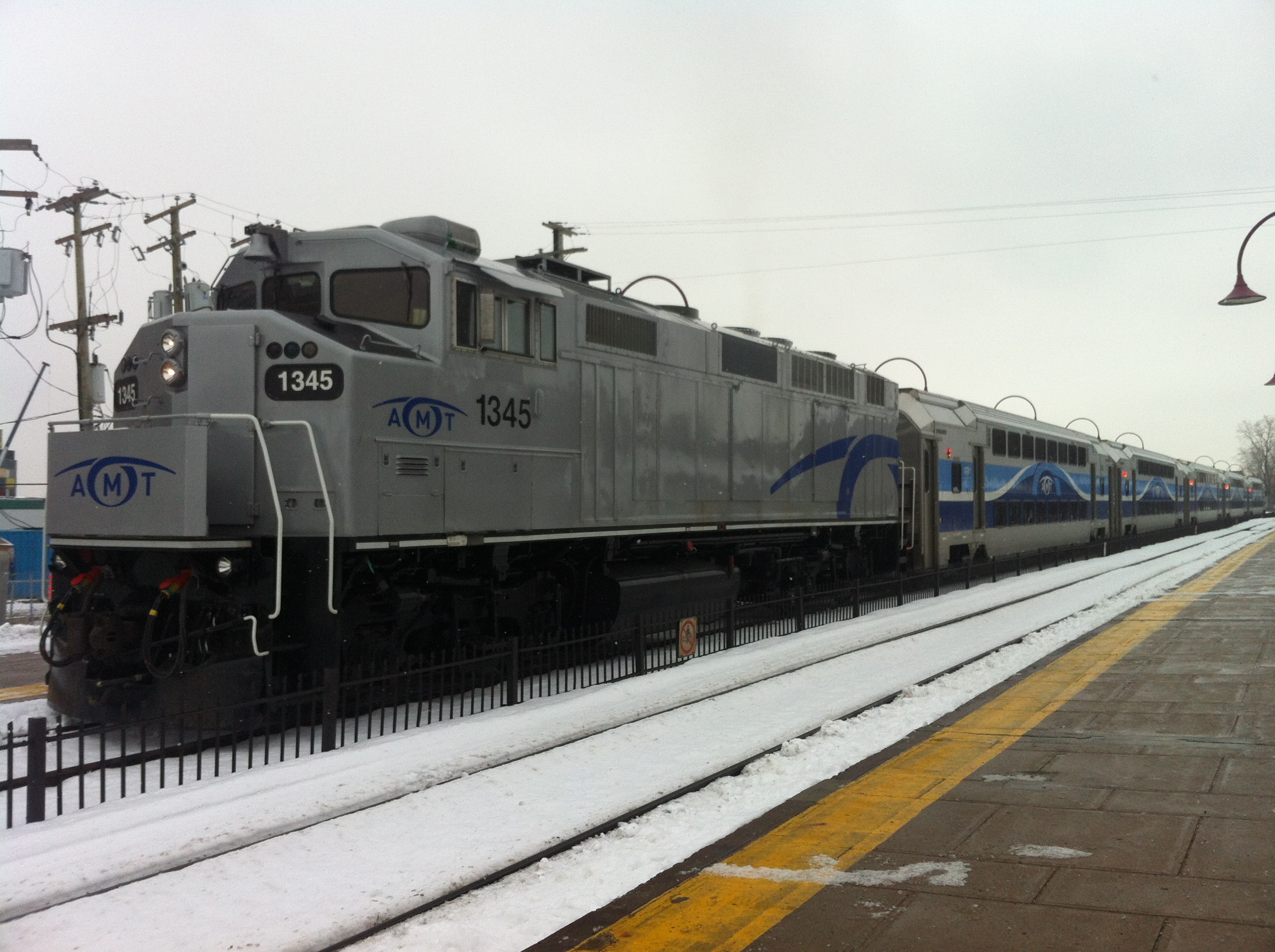
EMD F59PH locomotive from Delson-Candiac at Vendôme station

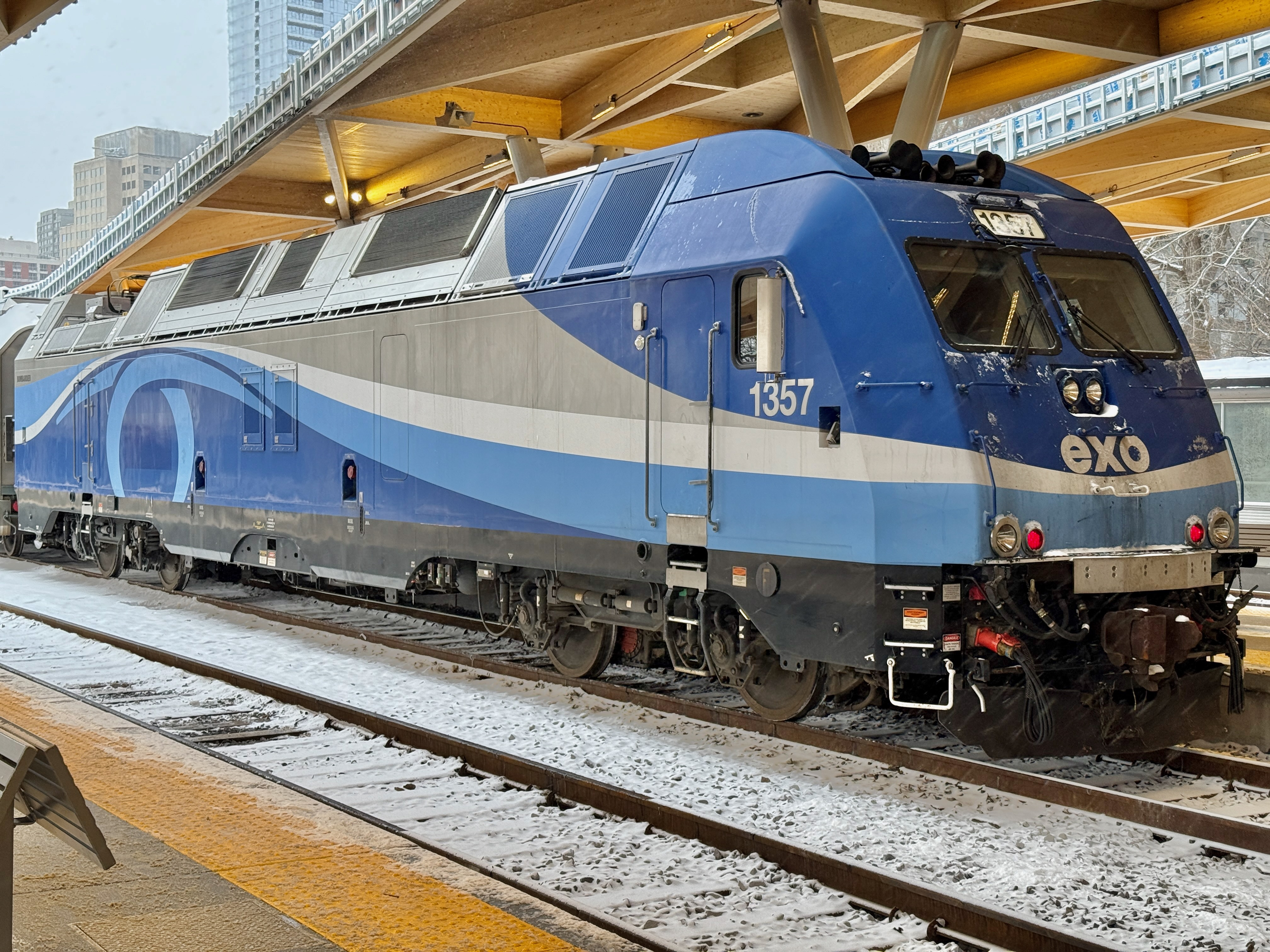
ALP-45DP locomotive from Vaudreuil-Hudson at Lucien-L'Allier station

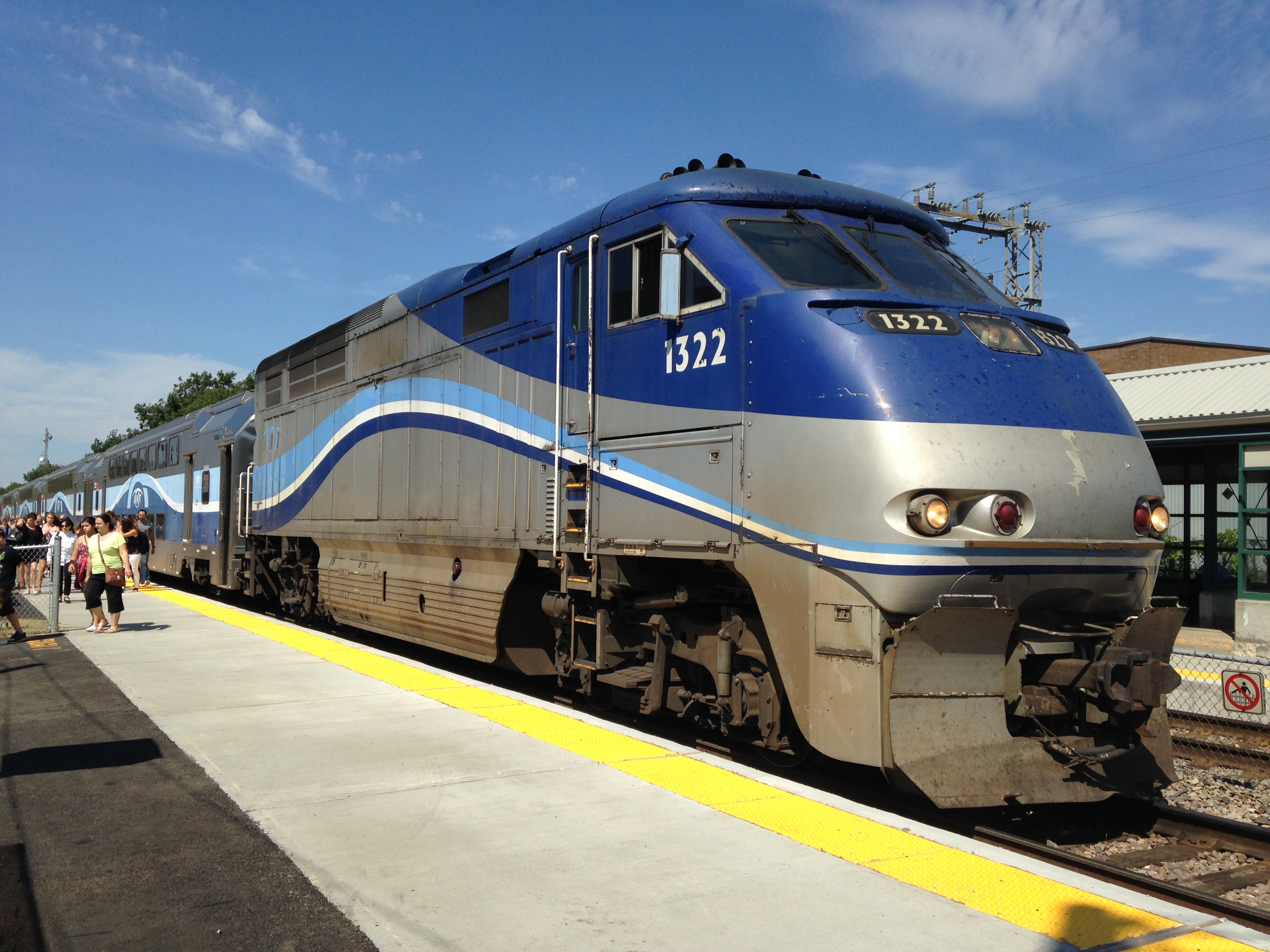
F59PHI locomotive at Parc station

==== Current locomotives ====
Maker	Model	Number in service	Numbered	Year built	Comments
Electro-Motive Diesel	F59PHI	8	1320–1330	2000	Used on the Vaudreuil-Hudson, Saint-Jérôme, and Candiac lines. Locomotives 1321, 1322 and 1330 are currently at CAD Rail industries for a rebuild.
Electro-Motive Diesel	F59PH	5	1341–1345	1990	Acquired from GO Transit. Used on the Mont-Saint-Hilaire and Mascouche lines. 1346 is in storage following its wreck in November 2023. Locomotives 1340, 1347, 1348 and 1349 were sold to GO Transit in April 2026, renumbered 580, 581, 582, and 583.
Bombardier	ALP-45DP	20	1350–1369	2011	Used on the Mont-Saint-Hilaire, Vaudreuil-Hudson, and Saint-Jérôme lines.
Siemens Mobility US	EC-42	4	1400-1409	2024	Used on the Saint-Jérôme and Vaudreuil-Hudson lines

==== Future locomotives ====
On January 28, 2022, Exo announced that it had ordered 10 Siemens Charger locomotives to replace their older F59PH locomotives. On November 18, 2024, the first unit was delivered and began tests around July. The first locomotive, 1400, entered service on the afternoon of November 3, 2025, on the Saint-Jérôme line. The remaining locomotives will be gradually delivered throughout 2026.

==== Retired locomotives ====
Maker	Model	Number in class	Numbered	Year built	Service years	Comments
Electro-Motive Diesel	F40PH	15	270–271, 274, 293, 301–302, 310, 330, 400, 418	1977–1985	2000s–2010s	Ex-Amtrak, (Note: Mostly the same numbers, except for 330, which is ex-VRE V33, nee-Amtrak 365; 310, which is ex-VRE V31, nee-Amtrak 392; and 418, which is ex-Amtrak 318.) leased from Rail World. All sold off to various leasing firms, tourist railroads, or other commuter railroads. (Note: Some units later leased to MBTA in 2015. Afterwards; 270 and 274 to Trinity Railway Express 130-131; 271 to Tshiuetin Rail Transportation 602; 310 to LTEX, then Steam Railroading Institute; 30 to Grand Canyon Railway 365 in 2023. Others sold to Rolling Stock Solutions in 2022.)
Electro-Motive Diesel	F40PH	15	243, 287, 319, 331, 372, 411	1977–1985	2000s–2010s	Ex-Amtrak; leased from Titan Rail. All sold off to various leasing firms, tourist railroads, or other commuter railroads. (Note: Some units sold to Rolling Stock Solutions in 2022.)
Electro-Motive Diesel	F40PH-2CAT	2	4117–4118	1981	2008–2012	Leased from NJ Transit until the arrival of the ALP-45DP locomotives.
Electro-Motive Diesel	GP40FH-2	5	4135, 4137, 4140, 4143, 4144	1966–1967	2008–2012	Leased from NJ Transit until the arrival of the ALP-45DP locomotives.
Electro-Motive Diesel	F59PH (Note: Distinct from the 1340 series locomotives still in service.)	3	526, 530, 532	1988	2010s	Ex-GO Transit; leased from Rail World.
Electro-Motive Diesel	F59PH	3	18523, 18524, 18531	1988	2010s	Ex-GO Transit; leased from Rosen-Beaudin Leasing.
Electro-Motive Diesel	FP7	6	1300–1305	1952	1982–2001	Ex-CP 4070–4075, 4040. Replaced by the F59PHI locomotives in 2001. 1301 now on the DGVR as "WM 243". 1306 to the Stourbridge Line as "PRR 9880".
Electro-Motive Diesel	FP7	6	1306	1951	1982–2001	Ex-CP 4070–4075, 4040. Replaced by the F59PHI locomotives in 2001. 1301 now on the DGVR as "WM 243". 1306 to the Stourbridge Line as "PRR 9880".
Electro-Motive Diesel	GP9RM	4	1310–1313	1959	1990-2010s	Ex-Canadian National, rebuilt by CN in 1990. 1311 preserved at Exporail.

=== Passenger cars ===
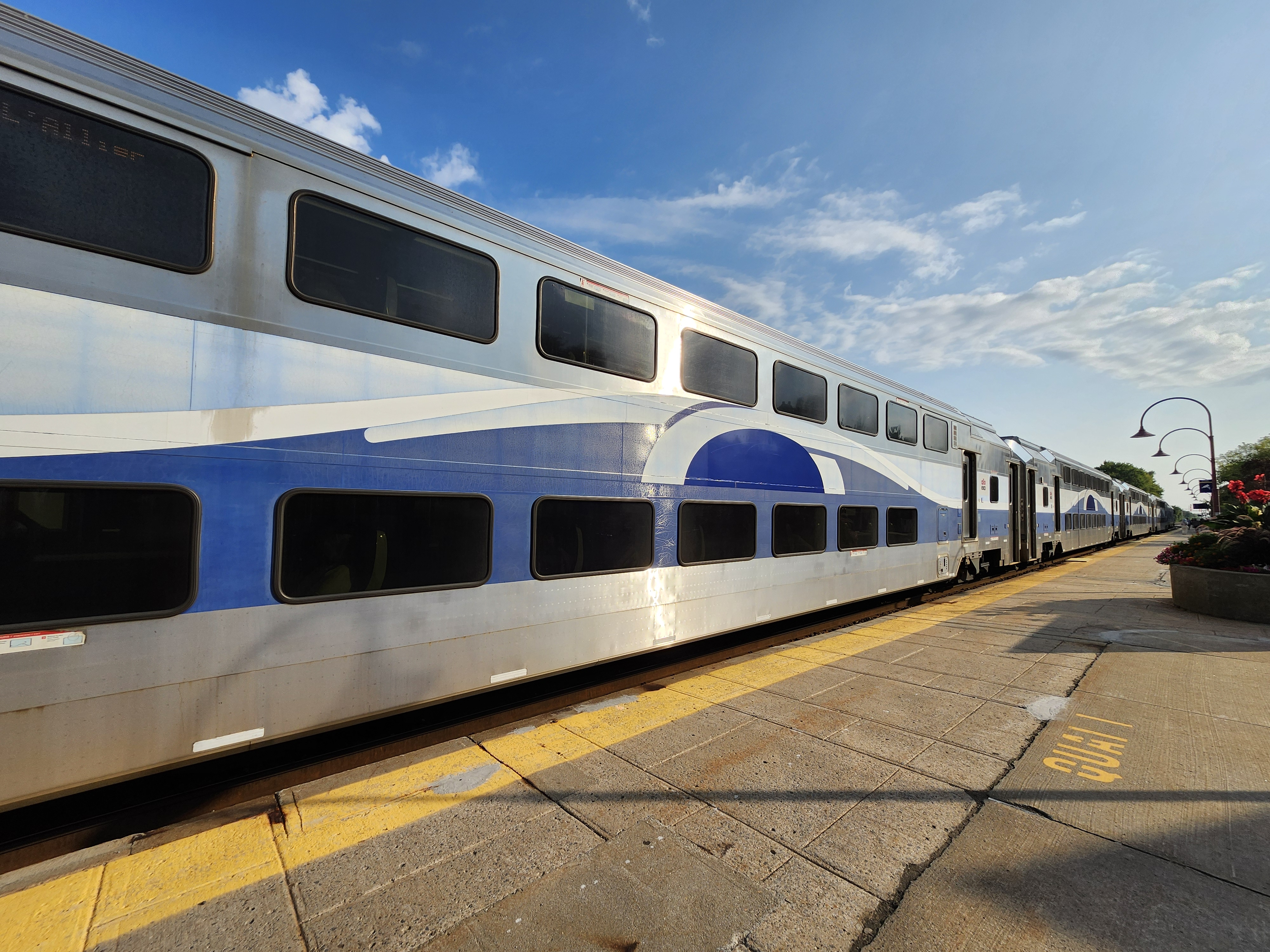
Bombardier Multilevel cars

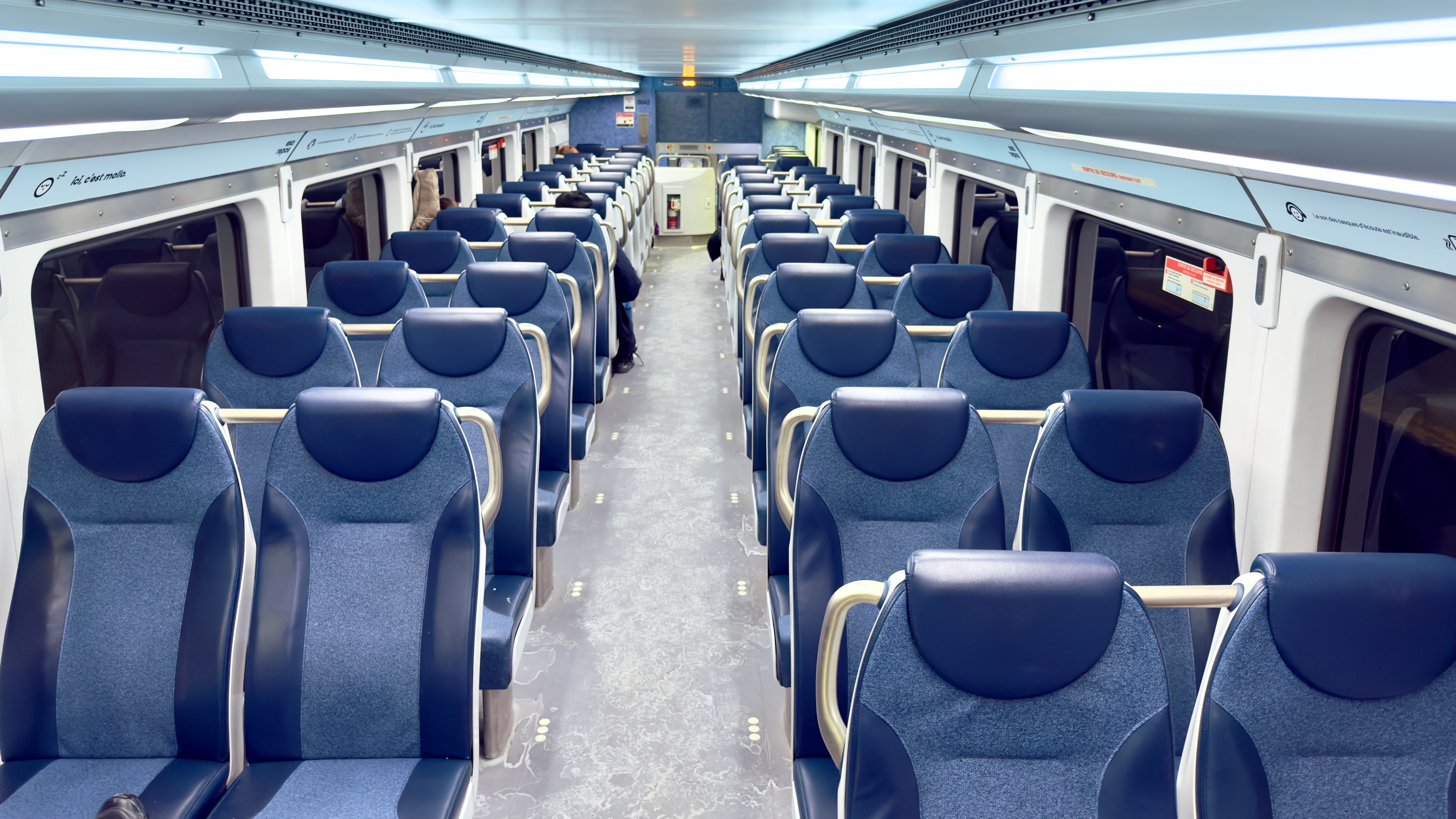
The interior of the upper level an Bombardier Multilevel commuter train

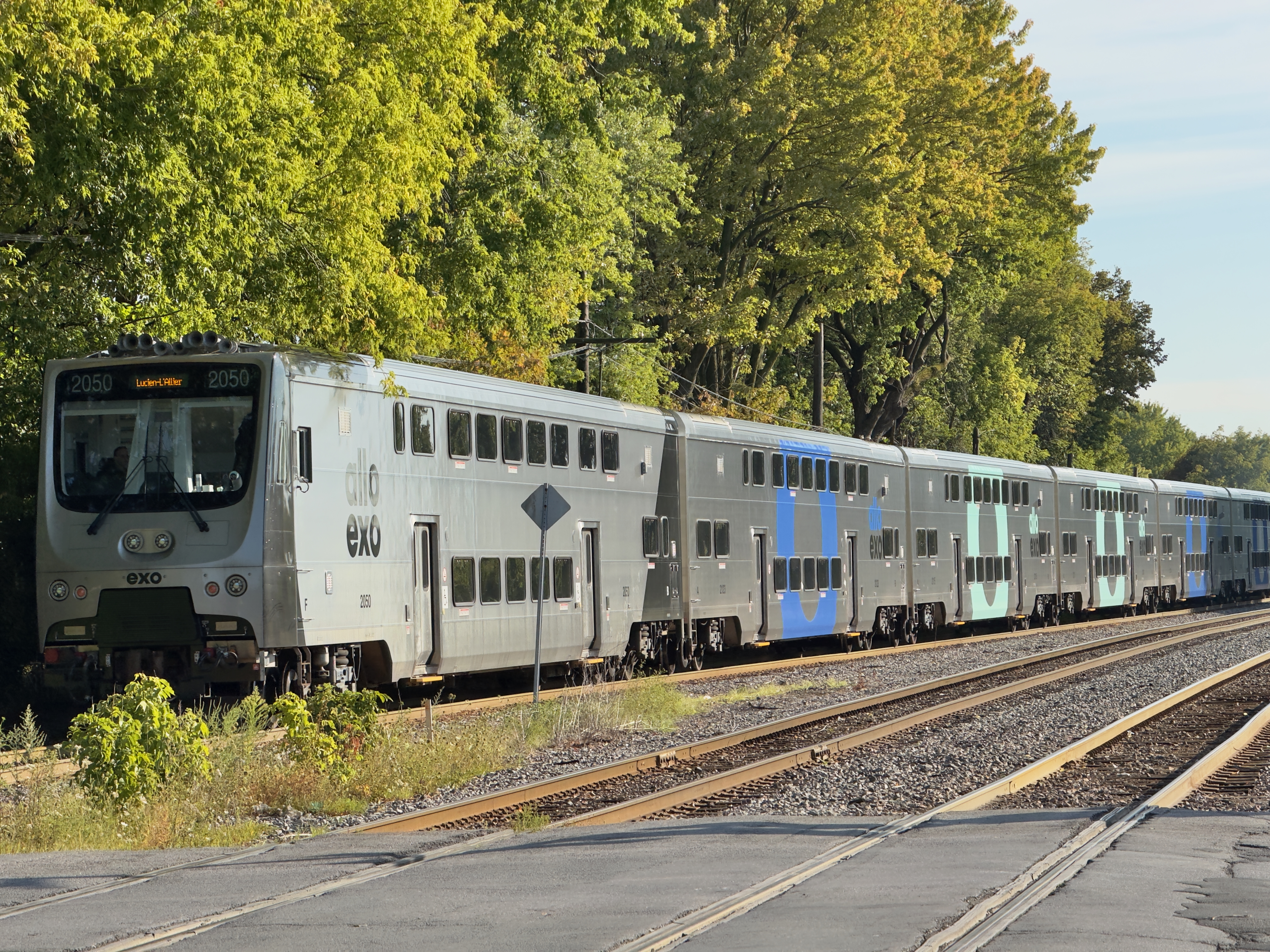
CRRC cars leaving Montréal-Ouest station.

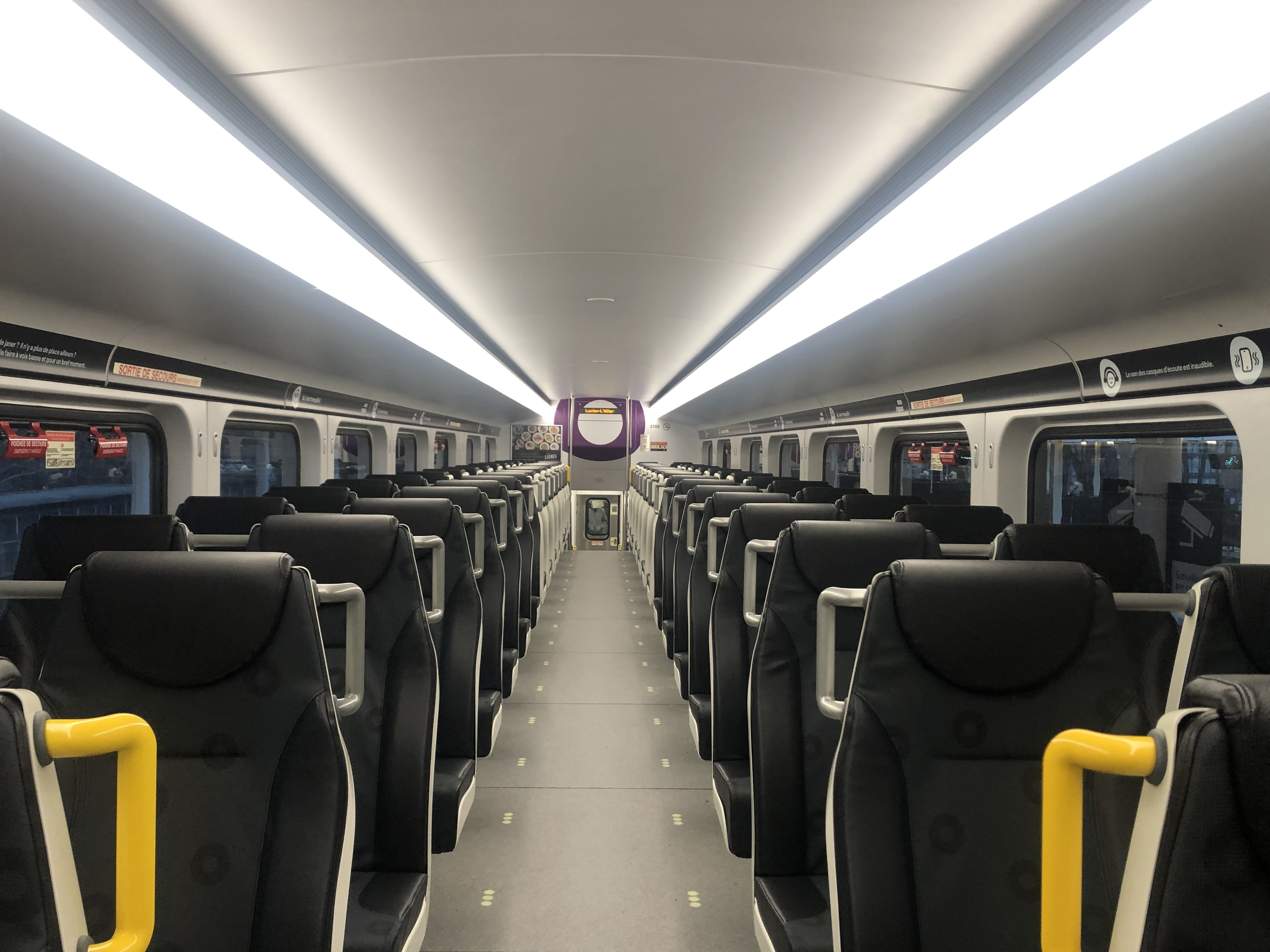
Interior of a CRRC coach car

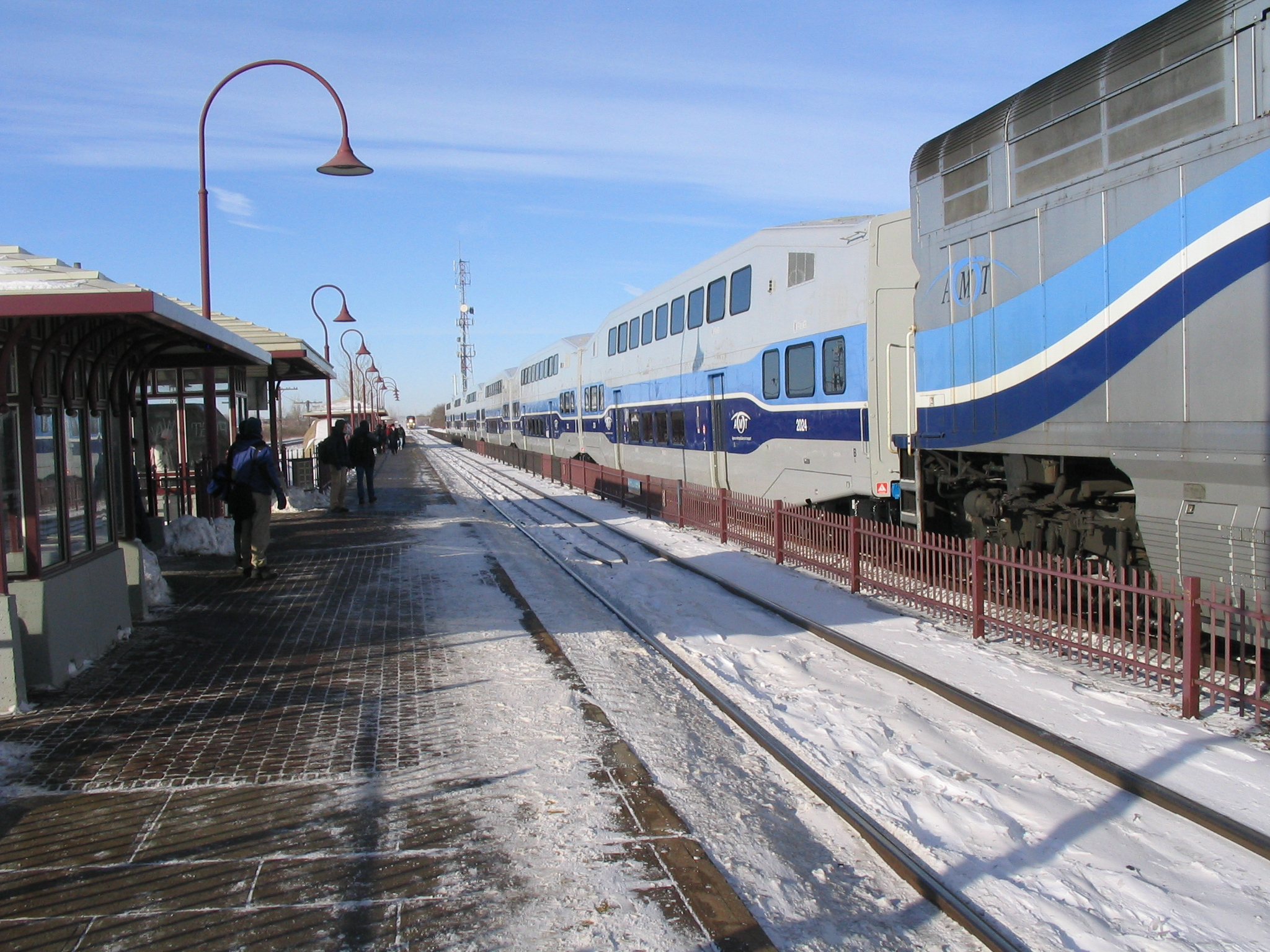
Bombardier BiLevel cars

==== Current coaches ====
Maker	Model	Number in service	Numbered	Year built	Comments
Bombardier Transportation	Bombardier Bi-level Coach	22	2000–2003	2004	Control cars. Low platform only
Bombardier Transportation	Bombardier Bi-level Coach	22	2020–2037	2005	Low platform only
Bombardier Transportation	Bombardier MultiLevel Coach	160	3000 series	2009–2011	High and low platform compatibility. Required for service on Mascouche and Mont St-Hilaire line
CRRC Tangshan	Bi-level coaches	44	2050 series	2022–2025	Entered service June 2024; Low platform only Cars 2126–2135 (salmon and red colours) are wheelchair accessible.

==== Retired coaches ====
Maker	Model	Number built	Numbered	Year built	Comments
Bombardier Transportation	Single-level coaches	24	701–708, 720–735	1989	Renovated 2011–2013. Retired in 2022 following delivery of new coaches. Sold to SEPTA in April 2026.
Hawker Siddeley	RTC-85SP/D coaches	80	102–111, 200–204, 1036–1103, 1201–1258	1967–1976	Ex-GO Transit. Retired after the arrival of the Bombardier MultiLevel Coaches. Car 104 on display at the Toronto Railway Museum in GO Transit colours.
Canadian Vickers	Gallery Car	9	900–901, 920–926	1969	Ex-Canadian Pacific Railway. Retired in 2010.
Morrison–Knudsen	Single-level coaches	14	5156–5234	1987–1988	Leased from NJ Transit in the late-2000s and early 2010s.

===== Other retired rolling stock =====
Maker	Model	Number built	Numbered	Year built	Comments
Canadian Car and Foundry	Head-end power cars	7	600–606	1958	Former boxcars rebuilt into head-end power cars by the Canadian National Railway in 1989, for use alongside the GP9RMs.
Bombardier Transportation	MR-90	58	400 series	1994–1995	Electric multiple units used only on the Deux-Montagnes line. Retired in 2020 when the Deux-Montagnes line was closed for conversion to the Réseau express métropolitain.

==== Further details ====
The 22 bilevel coaches are in operation on the Saint-Jérôme line. The AMT did not purchase additional bilevels as it sought to standardize its train fleet with the arrival of the multi-level coaches.

On December 18, 2007, the AMT awarded Bombardier a $386 million contract to build 160 multi-level commuter cars. These cars are based on NJ Transit's Multilevel series, and are able to enter the Mount Royal Tunnel, unlike the older GO-style BiLevel cars. They are numbered in the 3000s.

== See also ==
- Exo bus services
- Réseau express métropolitain
