= Exo (public transit) =

Regional public transport system in Greater Montreal, Quebec

- An Exo bus in Downtown Montreal (left); An outbound train on the Saint-Jérôme line (right)

Overview
- Locale: Greater Montreal
- Transit type: Commuter rail; Bus service; Paratransit; On-demand transit
- Number of lines: 5 (commuter rail); 219 (bus)
- Number of stations: 52 rail stations; 11 bus termini
- Annual ridership: 16,613,172 (bus); 7,051,965 (commuter rail); 736,451 (paratransit); 90,725 (on demand); (2024)
- Chief executive: Marc Rousseau
- Headquarters: 700 rue de la Gauchetière, Montreal, Quebec, Canada
- Website: exo.quebec/en

Operation
- Began operation: 1859 (first section); 1 January 1996 (as AMT); 1 June 2017 (as Réseau de transport métropolitain/Exo)
- Reporting marks: EXOX, AMXX
- Infrastructure managers: Canadian National Railway; Canadian Pacific Kansas City; Réseau de transport métropolitain
- Number of vehicles: 41 locomotives; 206 passenger cars (2024)

Exo, stylized as exo and officially known as the Réseau de transport métropolitain (French pronunciation: [ʁezo də tʁɑ̃spɔʁ metʁɔpɔlitɛ̃], RTM; English: Metropolitan Transportation Network), is a public transport system in Greater Montreal, including the Island of Montreal, Laval (Île Jésus), and communities along both the North Shore of the Mille-Îles River and the South Shore of the St. Lawrence River. It was created on 1 June 2017, taking over Montreal's commuter rail services from the former Agence métropolitaine de transport as well as bus and paratransit services from the various suburban municipal and intermunicipal transit agencies. Exo operates the second busiest such system in Canada after Toronto's GO Transit.

Exo's territory is concurrent with Montreal Metropolitan Community limits, with the addition of the Kahnawake First Nations reserve and the city of Saint-Jérôme. It serves a population of approximately 4 million people who make more than 174,000 trips daily in the 4,258.97 km^{2} (1,644.40 sq mi) area radiating from Montreal.

== History ==
A regional transit agency in Greater Montreal was first created by the Quebec government in 1995 with the Agence métropolitaine de transport, with the mandate of developing, coordinating and promoting transit throughout the area; improve and develop the commuter rail network, and; encourage integration of different modes of transit. On 20 December 1996, the AMT took over responsibility of the commuter trains from the Société de transport de la Communauté urbaine de Montréal (STCUM).

On 1 June 2017, the AMT was disbanded in a reorganization of metropolitan transit authorities. A new agency, the Réseau de transport métropolitain (RTM) was created to be responsible for operating commuter rail and suburban transit services.

In May 2018, the RTM adopted the Exo brand (stylized exo, all-lowercase), to represent the sub- and exurban nature of its service area.

== Partners in transport ==
Exo's parent agency, the Autorité régionale de transport métropolitain (ARTM), is charged with transportation planning for the Greater Montreal area.

Exo operates commuter train service as well as the bus service outside of the three main population centres of Greater Montreal. In these areas service is provided by the Société de Transport de Montréal on the Island of Montreal, the Société de Transport de Laval in Laval, and the Réseau de transport de Longueuil for the urban agglomeration of Longueuil.

== Commuter rail ==
Exo commuter rail (reporting marks EXOX, AMXX) is a system of five radial commuter rail services serving the Greater Montreal area. The network is operated by Alstom using trackage owned by Exo, the Canadian National Railway (CN), and Canadian Pacific Kansas City (CPKC).

Exo's commuter trains are its highest-profile division. It uses diesel-electric push-pull trains. The Mont-Saint-Hilaire and Mascouche lines run on CN trackage, while the Vaudreuil–Hudson, Saint-Jérôme, and Candiac lines run on CPKC trackage and operate out of Lucien L'Allier terminus. The Saint-Jérôme line also runs on Exo's own trackage between Sainte-Thérèse and Saint-Jérôme, as does the Mascouche line between Repentigny and Mascouche and the Vaudreuil–Hudson line between Vaudreuil and Hudson.

Operation of all commuter rail was provided by contract to CN and CP (on their respective rail networks) until June 30, 2017. Operations were taken over by Alstom (then Bombardier Transportation) beginning July 1, 2017, on an 8-year contract. In March 2026, operations of the commuter rail will be awarded to Transdev Canada, starting July 1, 2027, on a ten year contract.

The train lines are part of Greater Montreal's integrated public transit network including bus, regional rail (REM) and Metro, coordinated by the Autorité régionale de transport métropolitain (ARTM). Many train stations serve local bus terminals, and a few provide connections to Metro, REM and Via Rail and Amtrak national rail services.

== Buses ==
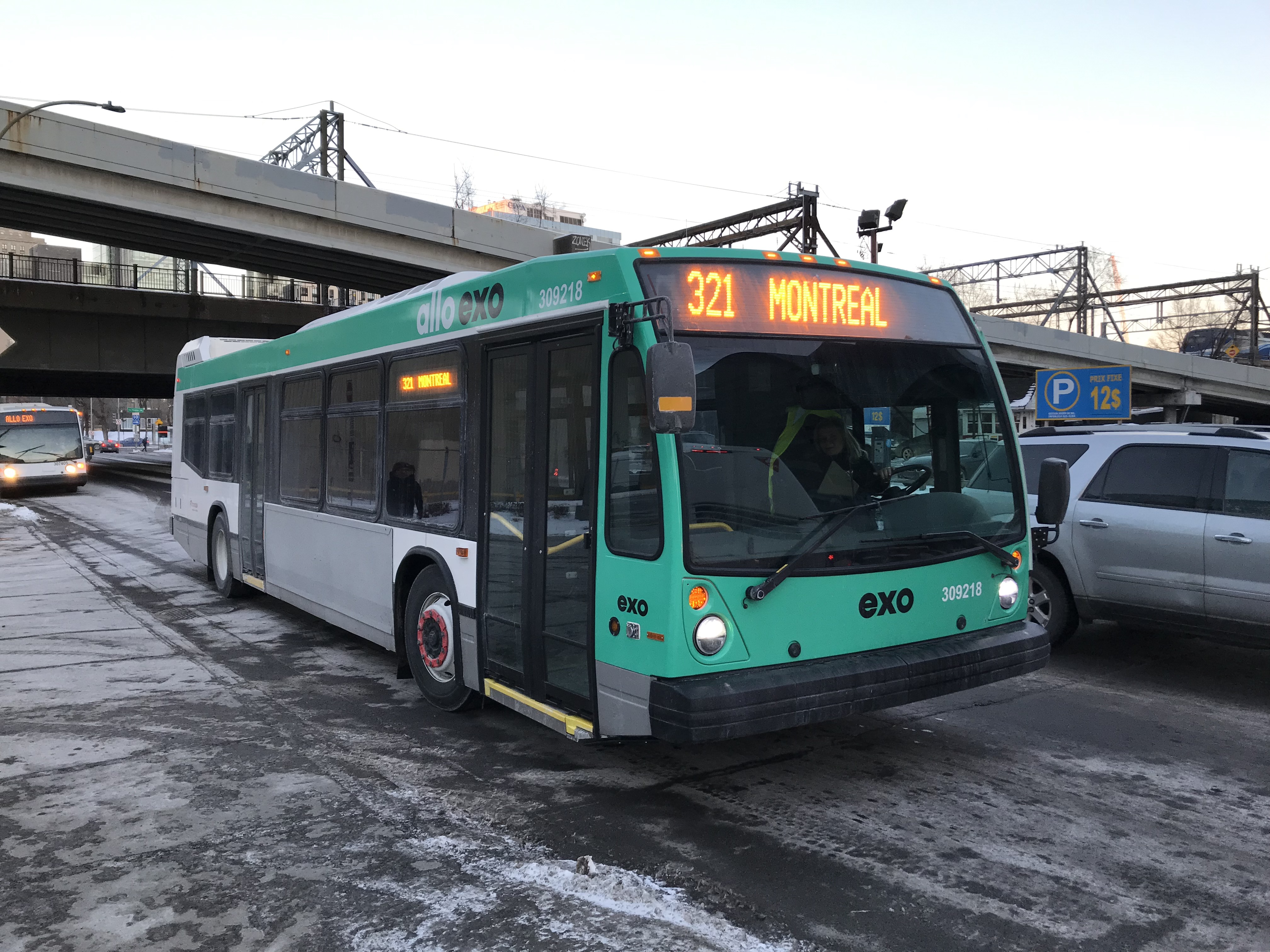
An Exo commuter bus in Downtown Montreal.

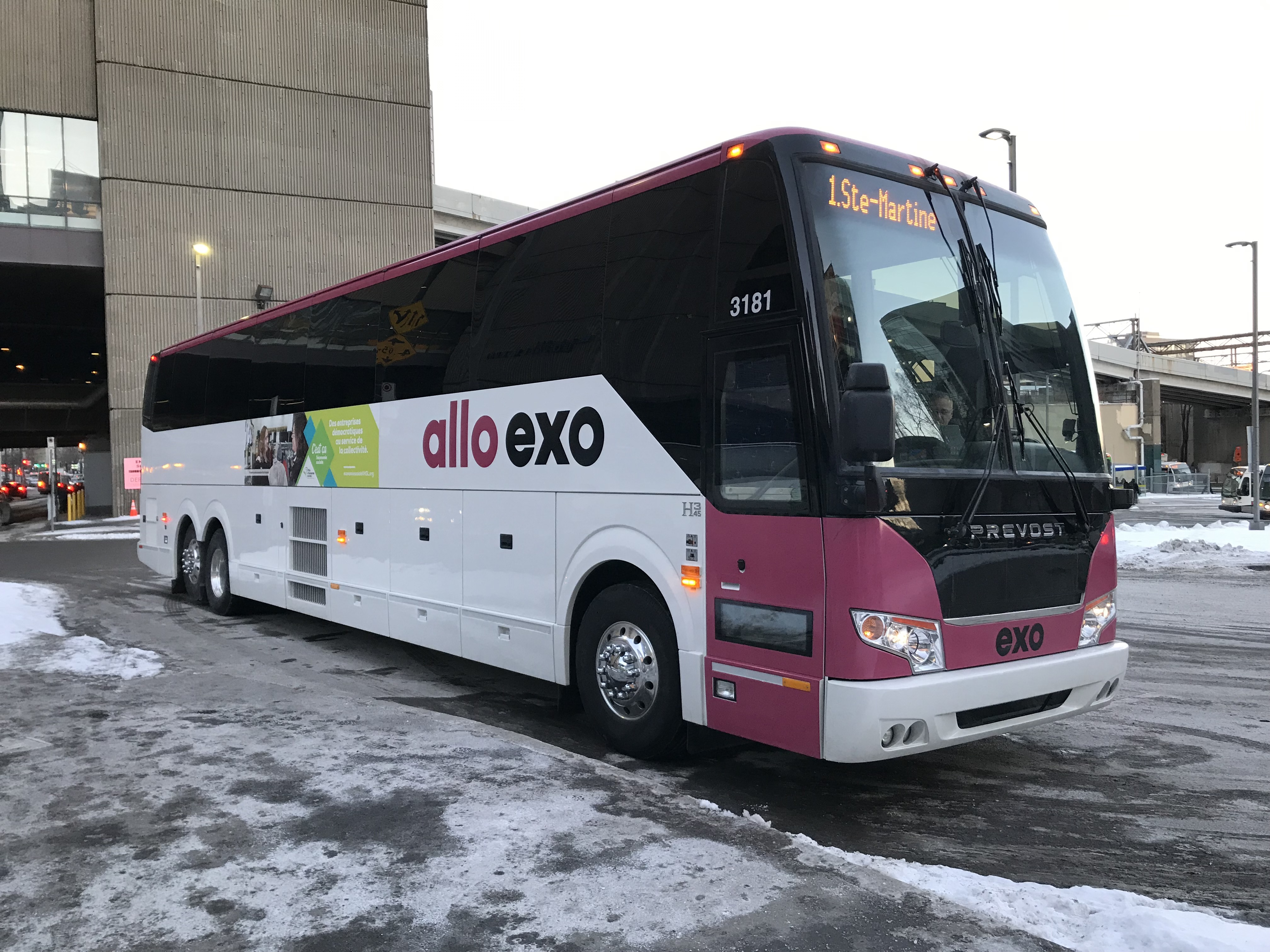
An Exo commuter coach at Mansfield Terminal in Downtown Montreal, headed for Sainte-Martine.

Exo runs multiple bus lines through its subsidiaries serving Montréal suburbs.

Exo operates all commuter bus services for the North Shore and South Shore suburbs, excepting the cities of Longueuil and Laval, which have their own transit agencies.

These bus services are operated mostly through 13 bus terminals, of which most belong to Exo :

- Terminus La Prairie
- Terminus Châteauguay
- Terminus Georges-Gagné
- Terminus Montcalm-Candiac
- Terminus Repentigny
- Terminus Terrebonne
- Terminus Sainte-Julie
- Stationnement incitatif Beloeil
- Terminus Chambly
- Terminus Contrecoeur

== Fares ==
Exo services operate within the Autorité régionale de transport métropolitain (ARTM)'s integrated fare structure for Greater Montreal, which manages its fare schedule and fare zones.

In 2022 the ARTM began a multi-year program of updating and simplifying the fare schedule. Through this process, and as the Réseau express métropolitain replaced some train and bus services, certain legacy fares were retained and new transitional fares were created, with the objective of slowly raising prices over time to match the simplified fare structure and then ultimately be phased out—a process called lissage (smoothing). As of July 2024, Exo commuter rail and certain bus sectors still have these unique fares.

== Ridership ==
In 2018, Exo carried 174,710 passengers on a typical weekday: 77,210 on the trains and 97,500 by commuter bus, including adapted transport.

Number of Passenger Trips (2024)
Rail lines
Vaudreuil–Hudson line	2,730,671
Saint-Jérôme line	2,250,728
Mont-Saint-Hilaire line	866,901
Candiac line	804,488
Mascouche line	399,177
Subtotal – Rail lines	7,051,965
Bus routes and on-demand
Exo North Shore buses	9,298,734
Exo South Shore buses	7,314,438
Exo Paratransit	736,451
On-demand transit	90,725
Subtotal – Bus system	17,440,348
Total – Exo System	24,492,313

== See also ==
- Autorité régionale de transport métropolitain
- Public transport in Canada
