= Westmount station =

Railway station in Montreal, Quebec, Canada

Westmount
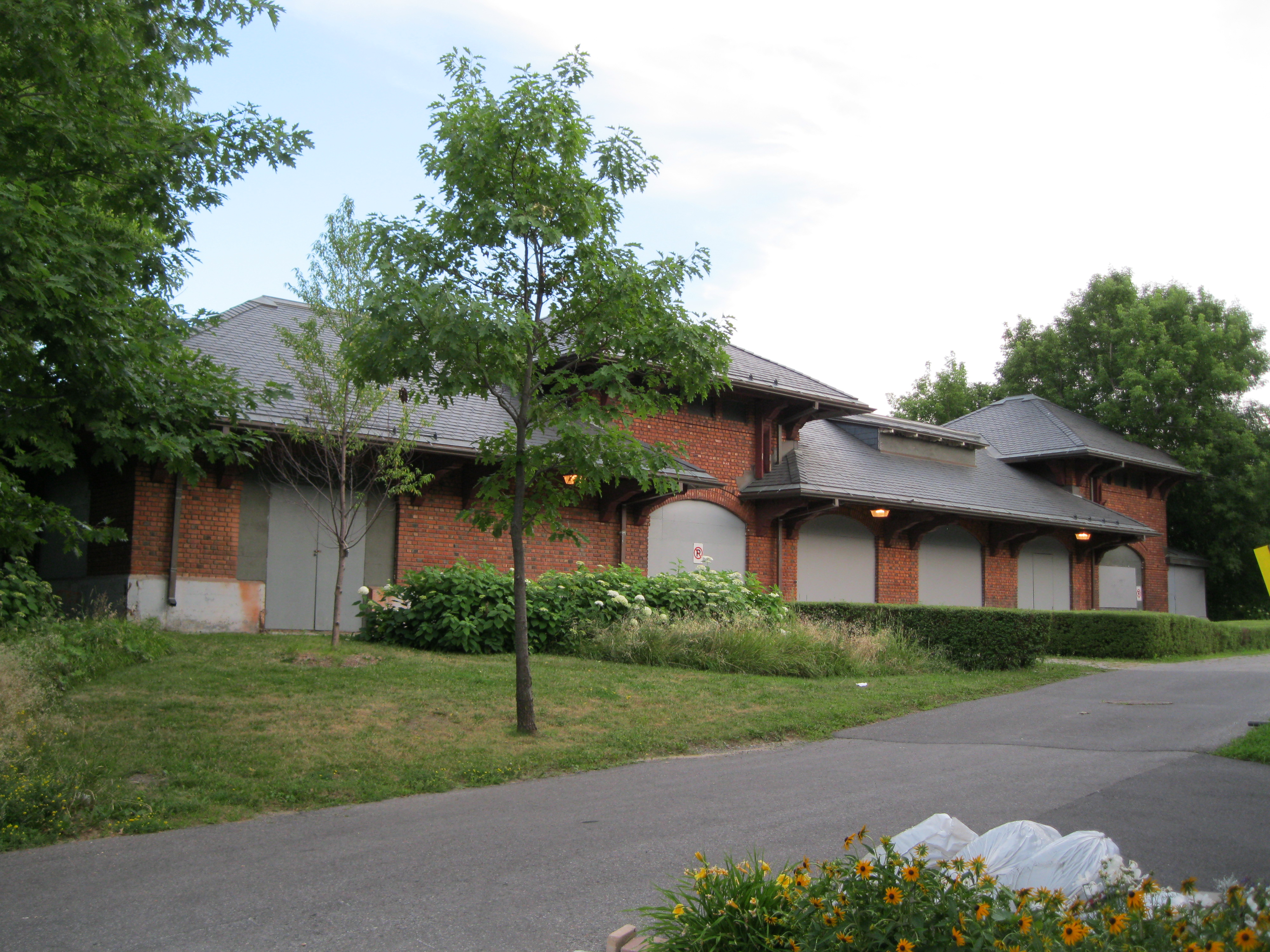
- Westmount railway station in 2012

General information
- Location: 4848 Saint Catherine Street West; Westmount, Quebec
- Coordinates: 45°28′36″N 73°35′53″W
- Line: Canadian Pacific Railway

History
- Opened: 1907
- Closed: 1984

Former services
Preceding station	Canadian Pacific Railway	Following station
Montreal West toward Vancouver	Main Line	Montreal Windsor Terminus
Montreal West toward Quebec	Montreal – Quebec	Montreal Windsor Terminus
Montreal West toward Ottawa	Ottawa – Montreal; Short Line	Montreal Windsor Terminus
Montreal West toward Rigaud	Montreal – Rigaud local stops	Montreal Windsor Terminus
Montreal West toward Detroit	Detroit – Montreal	Montreal Windsor Terminus
Montreal West toward Wells River	Montreal – Wells River	Montreal Windsor Terminus
Montreal West toward McAdam	Montreal – McAdam	Montreal Windsor Terminus
Preceding station	New York Central Railroad	Following station
Montreal West toward Utica	Adirondack Division	Montreal Terminus
Preceding station	Amtrak	Following station
Montreal West toward New York (Grand Central)	Adirondack bypassed 1983	Montreal Terminus

Heritage Railway Station (Canada)
- Designated: 1994
- Reference no.: 7097
Location

The Westmount station (French: Gare de Westmount) is a disused railway station in the city of Westmount, Quebec, Canada. Its address is 4848 Saint Catherine Street West at the bottom of Victoria Avenue in the Victoria Village neighbourhood. It was designed for the Canadian Pacific Railway by the company architect, W.S. Painter, and was completed in 1907.

== History ==
The station was expanded twice, in 1923 and 1927. The station is a testament to the rapid development of Westmount as a suburb of Montreal between 1890 and 1914. "The building’s architecture is typical of railway stations, composed of a long rectangular one-storey pavilion under a gabled roof and hipped caps, with a projecting bay that was once the ticket office, and corbels retaining the eaves."

The station closed with the end of VIA passenger service, circa 1984. Train service was moved to the Vendôme station, incorporating bus, train and metro service. The Westmount station was offered to the City of Westmount for a dollar in 1985, on condition that it be moved from the site. After much local protest, in 1989 it was allowed to stay on-site. The City approved the purchased of the building and the land under it in 1998. In 1999, the City passed a by-law authorizing permitted use of the facility: a heritage interpretive centre, an exhibition centre or a public park and square

The station was used for a "ski train" departing "Friday night or Saturday morning during the winter season, heading for the Laurentians. The cars were a forest of skis standing in the racks between the seats. It was always a noisy, colourful crowd of enthusiastic skiers."

As of 2008, the station is owned by the city of Westmount. The station closed to passenger service in 1984. It was recognized as a Heritage Railway Station according to the Heritage Railway Stations Protection Act in 1994. The station does not have municipal heritage protection and sits vacant.

Councilor Philip A. Cutler proposed to convert it into a tech hub during a 2016 council meeting in Westmount. He used the transformation of Notman House as a precedent and visited as part of a fact-finding mission.

== See also ==
- The Adirondack – the last intercity train to use this station
