= Montréal-Ouest station =

Railway station in Montreal, Quebec, Canada

Montréal-Ouest
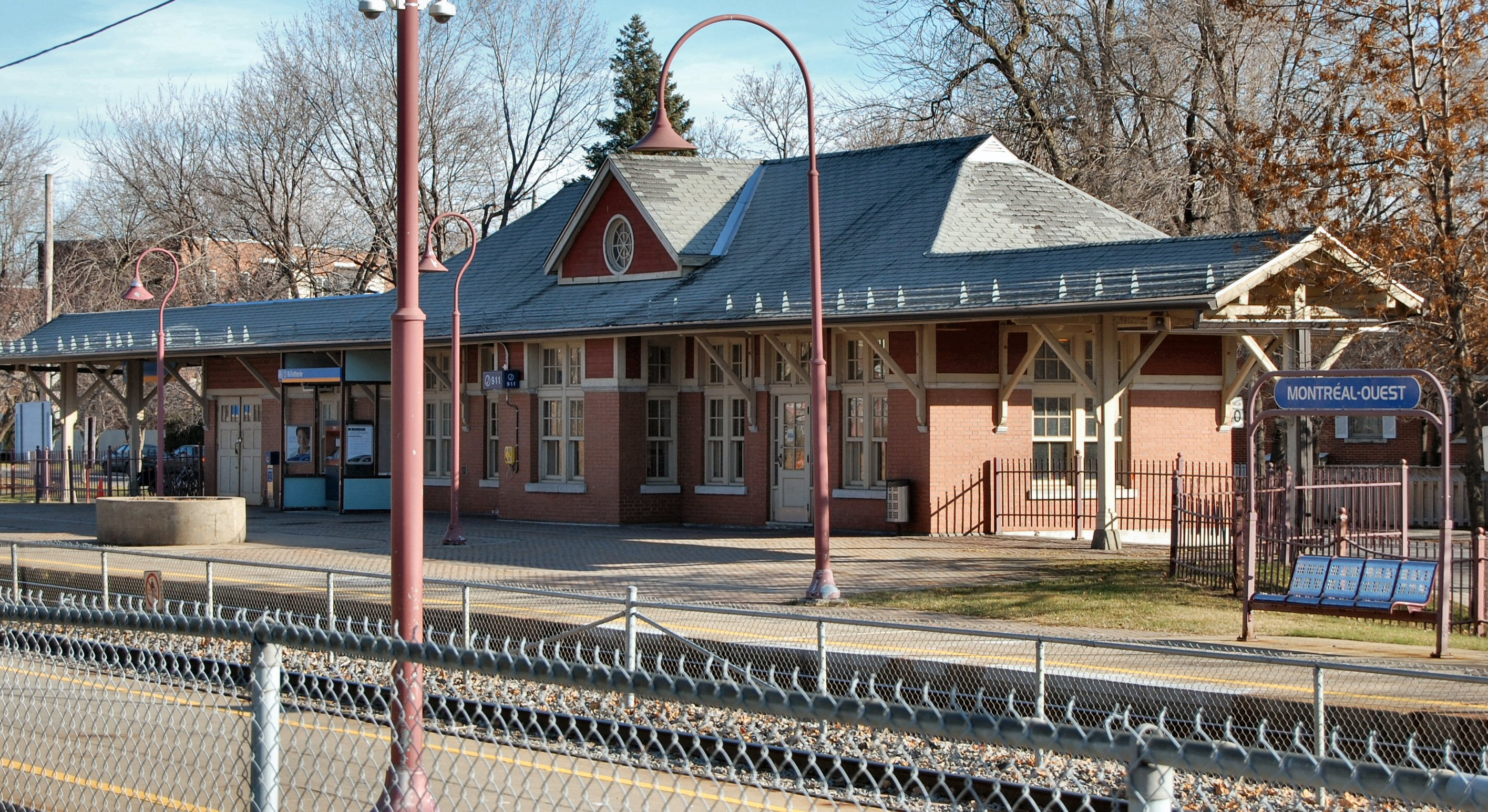

General information
- Location: 7499 Harley Avenue; Montreal, Quebec H4B 1L7
- Coordinates: 45°27′13″N 73°38′30″W
- Operator: Exo
- Platforms: 3 side platforms
- Tracks: 3
- Connections: STM bus

Construction
- Parking: 12 Park-and-Ride and 2 Carpooling spaces
- Cycle facilities: 15 spaces

Other information
- Fare zone: ARTM: A
- Website: Montreal-Ouest Station (RTM)

History
- Opened: 14 April 1889
- Former names: Montreal Junction

Passengers
- 2019: Vaudreuil-Hudson: 537,500; Saint-Jérôme: 239,300; Candiac: 130,100; Total: 906,900

Services
Preceding station	Exo	Following station
Lachine toward Hudson	Line 11 – Vaudreuil–Hudson	Vendôme toward Lucien-L'Allier
Parc toward Saint-Jérôme	Line 12 – Saint-Jérôme	Vendôme toward Lucien-L'Allier
Du Canal toward Candiac	Line 14 – Candiac	Vendôme toward Lucien-L'Allier
Former services
Preceding station	Canadian Pacific Railway	Following station
Ottawa toward Vancouver	Main Line	Westmount toward Montreal Windsor
Montreal Park Avenue toward Quebec	Montreal – Quebec	Westmount toward Montreal Windsor
Pointe Claire toward Ottawa	Ottawa – Montreal; Short Line	Westmount toward Montreal Windsor
Grovehill toward Rigaud	Montreal – Rigaud local stops	Westmount toward Montreal Windsor
Ste. Annes toward Detroit	Detroit – Montreal	Westmount toward Montreal Windsor
LaSalle toward Wells River	Montreal – Wells River	Westmount toward Montreal Windsor
LaSalle toward McAdam	Montreal – McAdam	Westmount toward Montreal Windsor
Preceding station	New York Central Railroad	Following station
Valleyfield toward Utica	Adirondack Division	Westmount toward Montreal
Preceding station	Amtrak	Following station
Rouses Point toward New York (Grand Central)	Adirondack bypassed 1983	Westmount toward Montreal
Track layout
Location

Montréal-Ouest station (French pronunciation: [mɔ̃ʁeal wɛst]) is a commuter rail station in the Montreal borough of Notre-Dame-de-Grâce, adjacent to the border with the town of Montreal West, Quebec, Canada. It serves the Exo Vaudreuil–Hudson, Saint-Jérôme, and Candiac lines. Montréal-Ouest station is located in ARTM fare zone A, and has 20 parking spaces. It is the station where these three lines come together as one towards Lucien-L'Allier station.

== Origin of name ==
Montréal-Ouest takes its name from the town of Montreal West, which this station serves. The town's main street, Westminster Avenue, crosses the tracks directly to the west of the station building.

== History ==
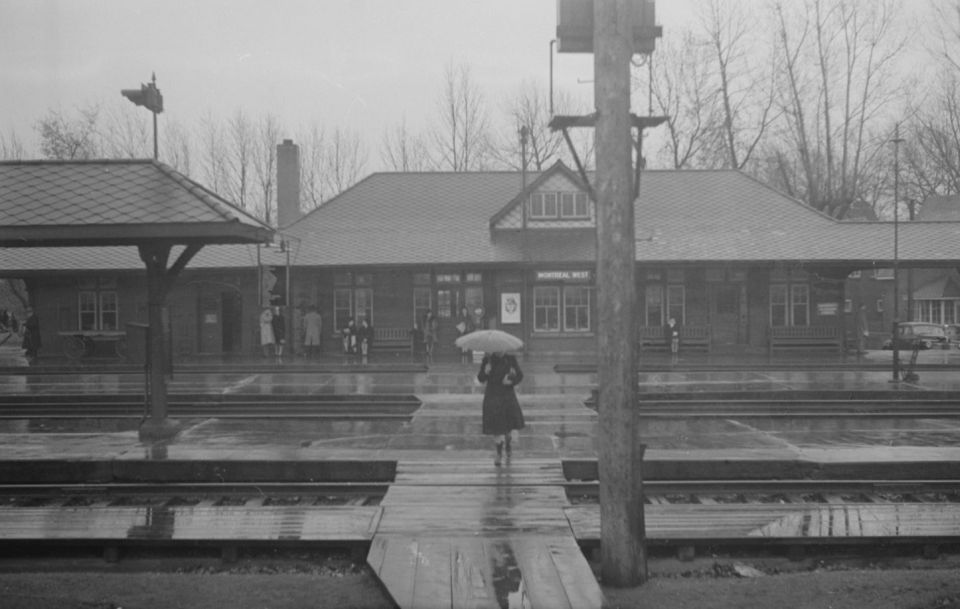
The station in October 1946

The station opened on 14 April 1889, when the Canadian Pacific Railway's Windsor Station and its approach tracks came into service. Its original name was Montreal Junction, the second place to bear this name, because it was (as it still is today) the place where numerous CPR passenger lines came together near the Montreal terminal. The present Montreal-West station was built in 1905.

Until about the 1970s there were 4 tracks at the station. Track 1 (the southernmost track, closest to the station) was removed. In the 1980s the crossover from North Junction into the station (track 4) was removed, but was restored in 1999 when the Blainville train line (now Saint-Jérôme line) started downtown service. It was not until 2003, however, that Saint-Jérôme trains stopped at Montréal-Ouest. At that point, the northernmost track (now signed as Track 3) was served by an island platform, which also served track 2.

In 2019, however, another side platform was built north of the station, with the northern face of the island platform fenced off. A new head house was built north of the tracks, opening in Fall 2023 and connecting Sherbrooke Street and the Elmhurst bus loop with track 3 and the passenger tunnel to the other tracks and the station building.

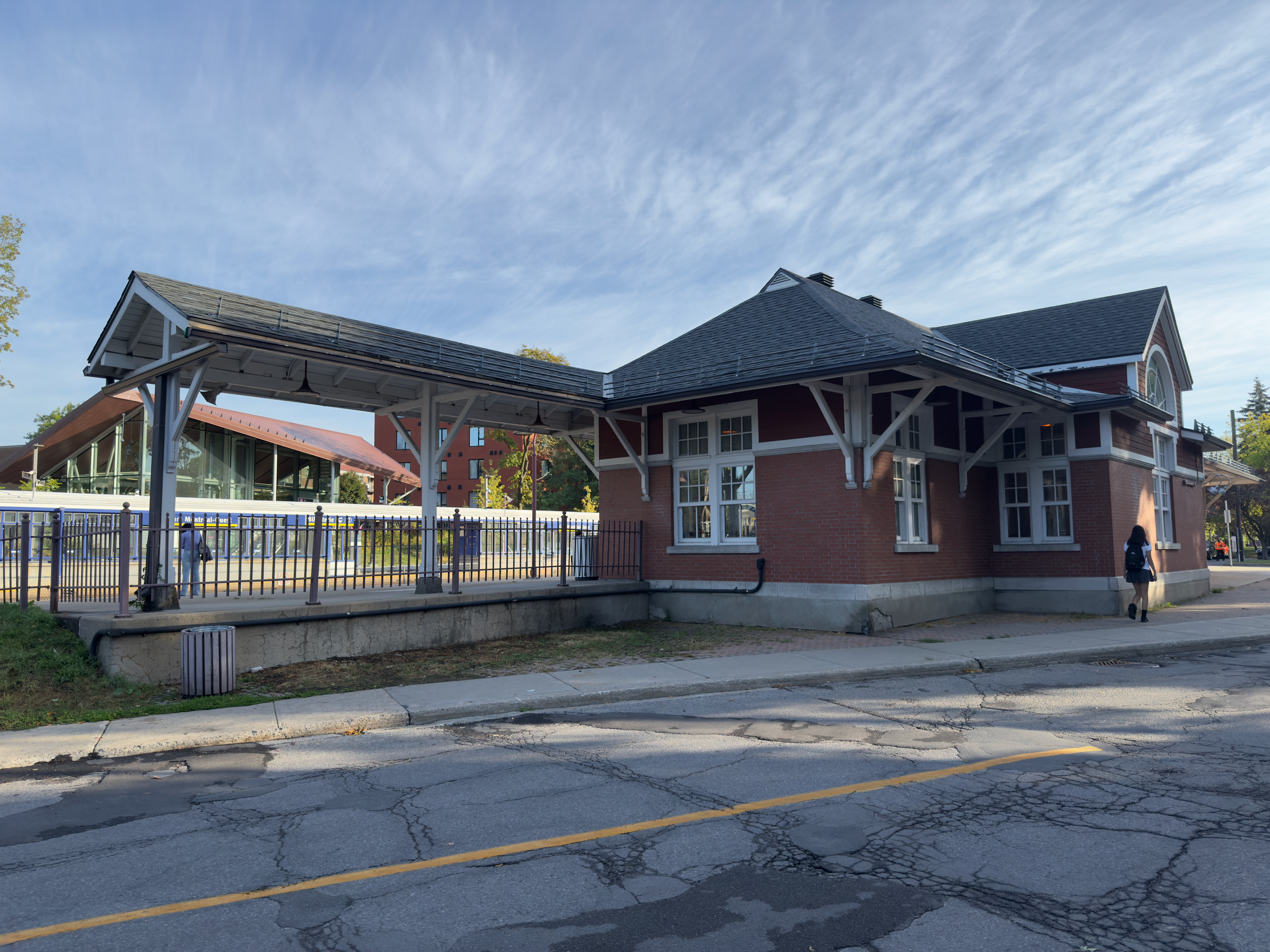
Station building with its head houses to tracks 2 and 3 in the background.

Along with Beaconsfield station, it is the only station on the line to retain its original station building (1889) in passenger use. In addition to ticketing facilities, the station building houses an underpass that connects to two headhouses on the island platform.

Prior to the reform of the ARTM's fare structure in July 2022, this station was in zone 1.

== Train services ==
=== Current ===
- Vaudreuil–Hudson line: (1889–1982 by CP, 1982–1996 by the STCUM, 1996–2017 by the Agence Métropolitaine de Transport (AMT), 2017–present, by Exo)
- Saint-Jérôme line: (1951–1980 by CP, 1999–2017 by the AMT, 2017–present, by Exo)
- Candiac line: (1889–1980 by CP, 2001–2017 by the AMT, 2017–present, by Exo)

=== Former ===
- Boston (The Alouette/The Red Wing: 1926–1959)
- Canadian train to Chicago: (1914–1940)
- Canadian train to Vancouver: (1955–1979)
- The Atlantic Limited: (1955-1979)
- The Adirondack: (1974–1986)

Most trains on these lines ran from Place Viger until it closed on 31 May 1951. They served Montreal-West only when their terminal was Windsor Station—a few trains until June 1951, all of them thereafter.

- Quebec City (via Trois-Rivières): (1951–1984)
- Ottawa via Montebello: (1951–1981)
- Mont-Laurier: (1951–1981)

== Connecting bus routes ==
Société de transport de Montréal
No.	Route	Connects to	Service times / notes
51	Édouard-Montpetit	Laurier; Édouard-Montpetit; Université-de-Montréal; Snowdon	Daily Some rush hour services start and end at Snowdon metro
105	Sherbooke	Vendôme	Daily
123	Dollard / Shevchenko		Daily
162	Westminster	Villa-Maria	Daily
356 ☾	Lachine / YUL Aéroport / Des Sources	Frontenac; Atwater; Du Canal; Dorval; Des Sources; Sunnybrooke; Pierrefonds-Roxboro	Night service Connects to Montréal-Trudeau International Airport

== See also ==
- The Adirondack, The last intercity train to use this station
