= Drury's =

Former Canadian restaurant

Drury's was a noted restaurant that existed in Montreal, Quebec between 1868 and 1959. Founded by John Drury in 1868, the restaurant served as a tavern and alehouse. The restaurant was passed down to Jimmy Drury (son of John) and sold in 1938 to Leo Dandurand. The restaurant underwent significant changes during the 1930s and it increasingly became well known throughout the city and outside the city. In November 1959, the restaurant was expropriated by the City of Montreal causing the closure of Drury's.

== Origin ==
Drury's was founded in 1868, by an Irish fellow named John Drury; it started out as an old English chop house and tavern located in Montreal, Quebec on the corner of Windsor and St. Antoine street. Drury's was relocated across the street to Osborne Street in 1888, following the Canadian Pacific Railway’s enlargement of the Windsor station.

== Early Days ==
Drury’s received popular attention from the president of the Canadian Pacific Railway during the late 19th century, Thomas George Shaughnessy. The CPR president grew deeply fond of the restaurant and engaged in business talks daily at Drury’s with notable figures like J. P. Morgan, Jay Gould, and James J. Hill.

== New Management ==
Drury’s underwent significant changes following 1938, when the son of the founder Jimmy Drury sold the restaurant to a successful entrepreneur Leo Dandurand. The new owner didn’t attempt to make changes that would affect the great atmosphere of the restaurant however did some renovations to enhance the visual aesthetics. Wall to wall carpeting was installed as well as upgraded to a full liquor license replacing the beer license, and this resulted in Drury’s being regarded as a tavern into being recognized as the Club. Dandurand brought in a world class chef and hired waitresses to tend the customers in the restaurant. "Soon Drury’s was transformed from a simple chop house into one of the finest eating establishments in North America."

== Architecture ==
Drury's was just as famous for its environment as it was for its delicious dishes and fine tasting wines. Outside, the restaurant appeared as an old London chophouse with tall windows in stone frames. The restaurant was entered from the western side under a large canopy and old-fashioned lamps. An immense wooden door standing in the entrance reminded the customer of the Victorian architecture. Oppose to one large dining room filled with numerous of tables, there were a number of small rooms with tables to resemble the Victorian style building. Dark panelling and large comfortable leather chairs provided a sense of home and relaxation, and the stained glass windows cut off the customers from the world outside them.

== Cuisines ==
Popular courses at Drury's included roast rib of beef, steak and kidney pie, chicken pot pie, and English mutton chop. The roast rib of beef came was served anywhere from rare to well-done and with Yorkshire pudding. The steak and kidney pie came in individual casseroles along with small button mushrooms, round pellets of carrot and turnip, peas and onions. The dish was served with broccoli and hollandaise sauce as well as a rich gravy. The chicken pot pie also came in separate casseroles with large pieces of chicken breast that was served with the round pellets of turnip, carrot and potato, peas and onions.

== Famous Patrons ==
Drury's became a hotspot for visiting celebrities between the 1930s to 1950s as the restaurant served the likes of Sir Anthony Eden, Eleanor Roosevelt, Vincent Massey, Charles Boyer, Mary Pickford, Jack Benny, Leopold Stokowski and Maurice Chevalier.

== The End ==
On Tuesday morning of November 2, 1959, Dandurand walked into his office to see an envelope from the City of Montreal sitting on his desk. The letter served as a notification that the city would be commencing a street widening project in 30 days' time and Drury's was set to be expropriated. It was well known that there was a project to widen Osborne Street, however the previous municipal government under mayor Jean Drapeau designed a solution to avoid any interference with Drury's property. In 1959, the administration under Mayor Sarto Fournier had different intentions than those of M. Drapeau, and the expropriation of Drury's was in effect.

"Yet perhaps the most impressive thing about Drury’s is how widely it was known outside of Montreal. No one who dined there seemed to be able to forget it and its legion of friends are spread through many lands. To these, the knowledge that Montreal is without Drury’s will bring a sense of loss. It is as yet uncertain whether a new Drury’s is to arise. But some tears were certainly shed Saturday night for the old place looking out across Dominion Square. For in its closing, something has gone out of the city’s life.". The excerpt above was taken from the December 1, 1959 issue of the Montreal Gazette just a couple days after the closing of the Drury's restaurant in Montreal.
