= Victoria Village, Westmount =

Victoria Village Village Victoria (French)
- Neighbourhood
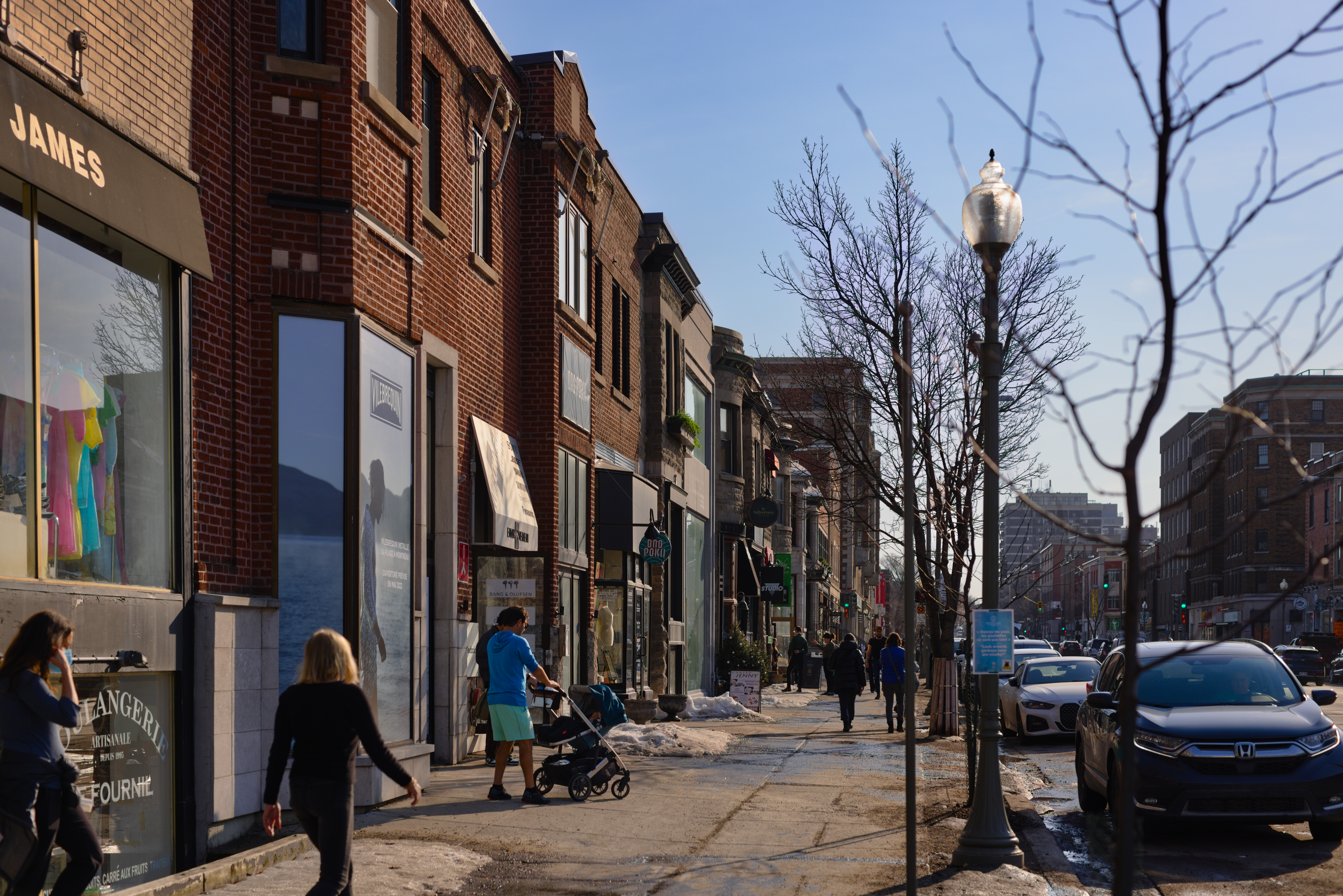
- Storefronts along Sherbrooke Street in Victoria Village, March 2022

- Location of Victoria Village on the Island of Montreal
- Coordinates: 45.478983°N 73.6034497°W
- Country: Canada
- Province: Quebec
- City: Westmount
- Time zone: UTC−5 (EST)
  - Summer (DST): UTC−4 (EDT)
- Postal code span: H3Z
- Area codes: 514 and 438

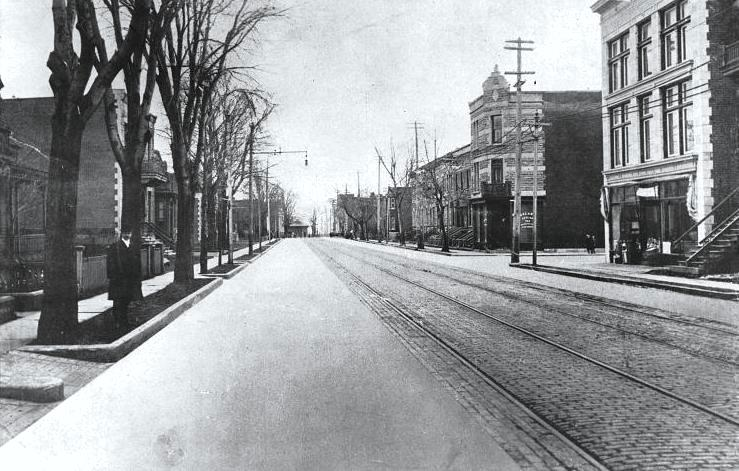
Victoria Avenue in 1910

Victoria Village (French: Village Victoria, pronounced [vilaʒ viktɔʁja]) is a commercial and residential neighbourhood in the southwest corner of the city of Westmount, in Greater Montreal, Quebec, Canada. Victoria Village's commerce is centred along Sherbrooke Street and Victoria Avenue; some other businesses are located on Prince Albert Avenue, Claremont Avenue, and Somerville Avenue.

The neighbourhood features a variety of businesses including restaurants, coffee shops, grocers, and clothing stores, many of which are independent. Some higher-end outlets are now also located in Victoria Village. Outdoor gear manufacturer Arc'teryx opened its first compact "Arc'type" location in Canada in the neighbourhood in 2021, followed by Canada's first Vilebrequin swimwear store in 2022.

The Westmount Park and Public Library are located near Victoria Village to the east. On the west, the neighbourhood extends to the Montreal border, where it meets the district of Notre-Dame-de-Grâce (NDG). Le Sud-Ouest borders it to the south, beyond the former train station and across the Canadian Pacific Railway tracks. Vendôme station in NDG provides the Montreal Metro's closest access to the neighbourhood, and it is also connected to NDG and downtown by multiple Montreal bus routes including the 104 Cavendish and 105 Sherbrooke.
