= Vendôme station =

Montreal Metro station

Vendôme

General information
- Location: 5160, boul. de Maisonneuve Ouest; Montreal, Quebec H4A 3S9; Canada
- Coordinates: 45°28′26″N 73°36′14″W
- Operator: Société de transport de Montréal
- Platforms: 2 side platforms
- Tracks: 2
- Connections: Vaudreuil-Hudson line; Saint-Jérôme line; Candiac line; STM bus

Construction
- Depth: 6.1 metres (20 feet), 57th deepest
- Accessible: Yes
- Architect: Desnoyers, Mercure, Leziy, Gagnon, Sheppard et Gélinas

Other information
- Fare zone: ARTM: A

History
- Opened: 7 September 1981

Passengers
- 2024: 6,031,289 ▲41.56%
- Rank: 6 of 68

Services
| Preceding station | Montreal Metro | Following station |
|---|---|---|
| Villa-Maria toward Côte-Vertu | Orange Line | Place-Saint-Henri toward Montmorency |
Location

Vendôme station (French pronunciation: [vɑ̃dom]) is an intermodal transit station in the borough of Côte-des-Neiges–Notre-Dame-de-Grâce in Montreal, Quebec, Canada, near the town of Westmount in the Westmount Adjacent area of Notre-Dame-de-Grâce that adjoins the Décarie Expressway. It is operated by the Société de transport de Montréal (STM) and serves the Orange Line of the Montreal Metro.

The Metro station connects to Exo's commuter rail network by a pedestrian tunnel, permitting access to platforms providing service on the Vaudreuil-Hudson, Saint-Jérôme and Candiac lines.

== Overview ==
Originally, two stations were supposed to be built between Place-Saint-Henri and Villa-Maria: Northcliffe and Westmount. However, opposition from Westmount residents as well as instability in the underlying rock formation forced their consolidation into one station, with the result that the tunnel between Vendôme and Place-Saint-Henri is the longest on the Island of Montreal.

The station is a normal side platform station with an entrance near the midpoint of the platforms. The main entrance is located on De Maisonneuve Boulevard and another entrance is located in the bus loop. The structure sits directly above the platforms and includes and surrounds the sunken mezzanine. It is the network's deepest station without escalators or moving sidewalks.

The station was designed by the firm of Desnoyers, Mercure, Leziy, Gagnon, Sheppard et Gélinas. It contains a plaque commemorating Jean Descaris, a 17th-century pioneer, and his descendant Alphonse Décarie, on whose land Vendôme and Villa-Maria Metro stations were built. The adjacent train station is in Fare Zone 1.

== Accessibility and MUHC Hospital connection ==
A short tunnel under the railway tracks links this Metro station to the McGill University Health Centre, which opened in 2015. Initially, the tunnel provided access only to a secondary entrance building on the hospital campus, with a door between the tunnel and the underground parking garage kept locked; however, the access to the underground parking was later opened to the public and pedestrian paths through the garage provided, offering indoor access from the metro to the hospital. Although the secondary entrance building has an elevator, the new tunnel was not wheelchair accessible, with only stair access to the metro and commuter trains. This lack of provision was criticised by advocates.

In fall 2017, construction began on another entrance to the station, located east of the bus loop. This was designed to offer a wheelchair-accessible direct connection between the metro station, the commuter train platforms, and the hospital via a pedestrian tunnel. The choice to construct a second access was made because retrofitting the existing access was deemed prohibitively expensive. The new entrance pavilion also includes new public art. The new entrance was opened on May 31, 2021, making the station fully accessible.

Ground level windows

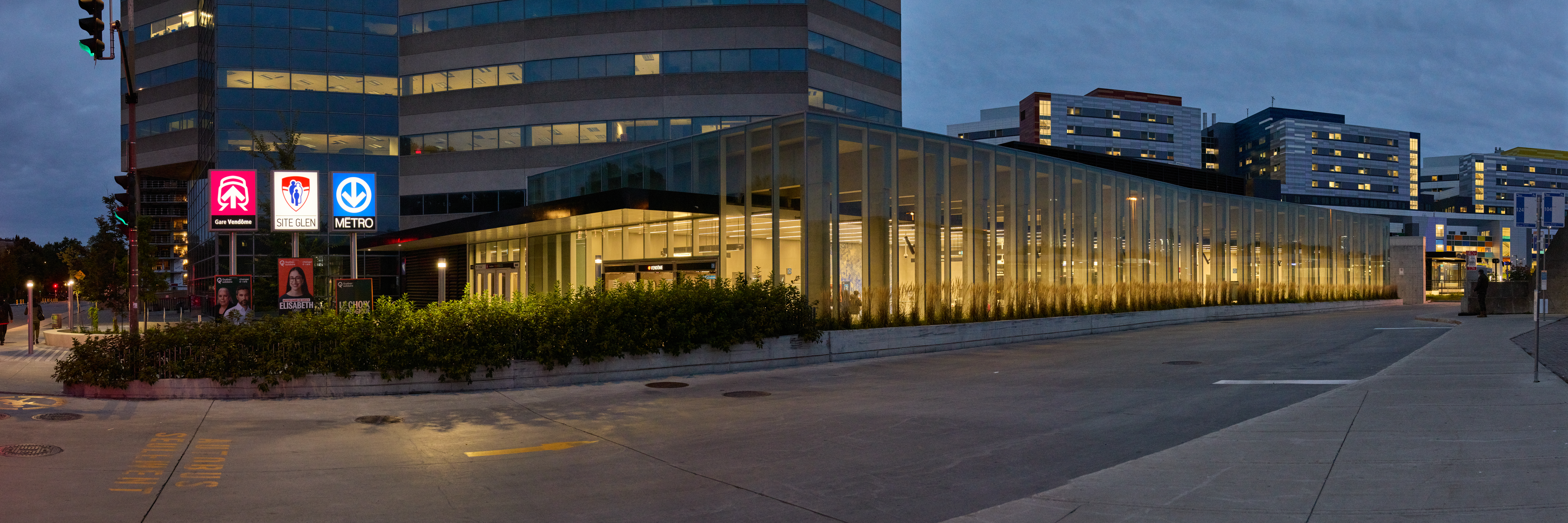
Exterior of new entrance pavilion viewed at night

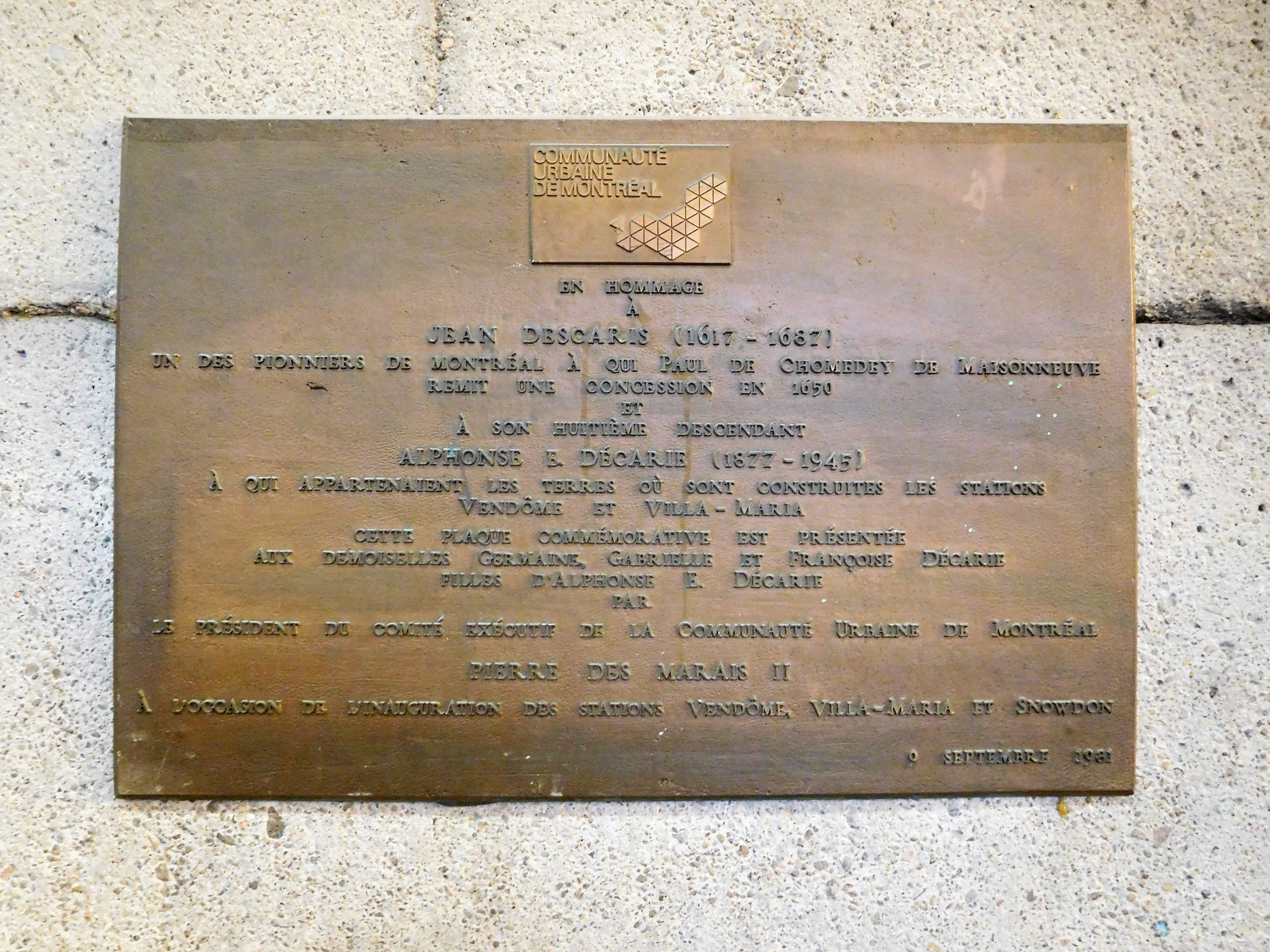
The memorial plaque

== Artwork ==
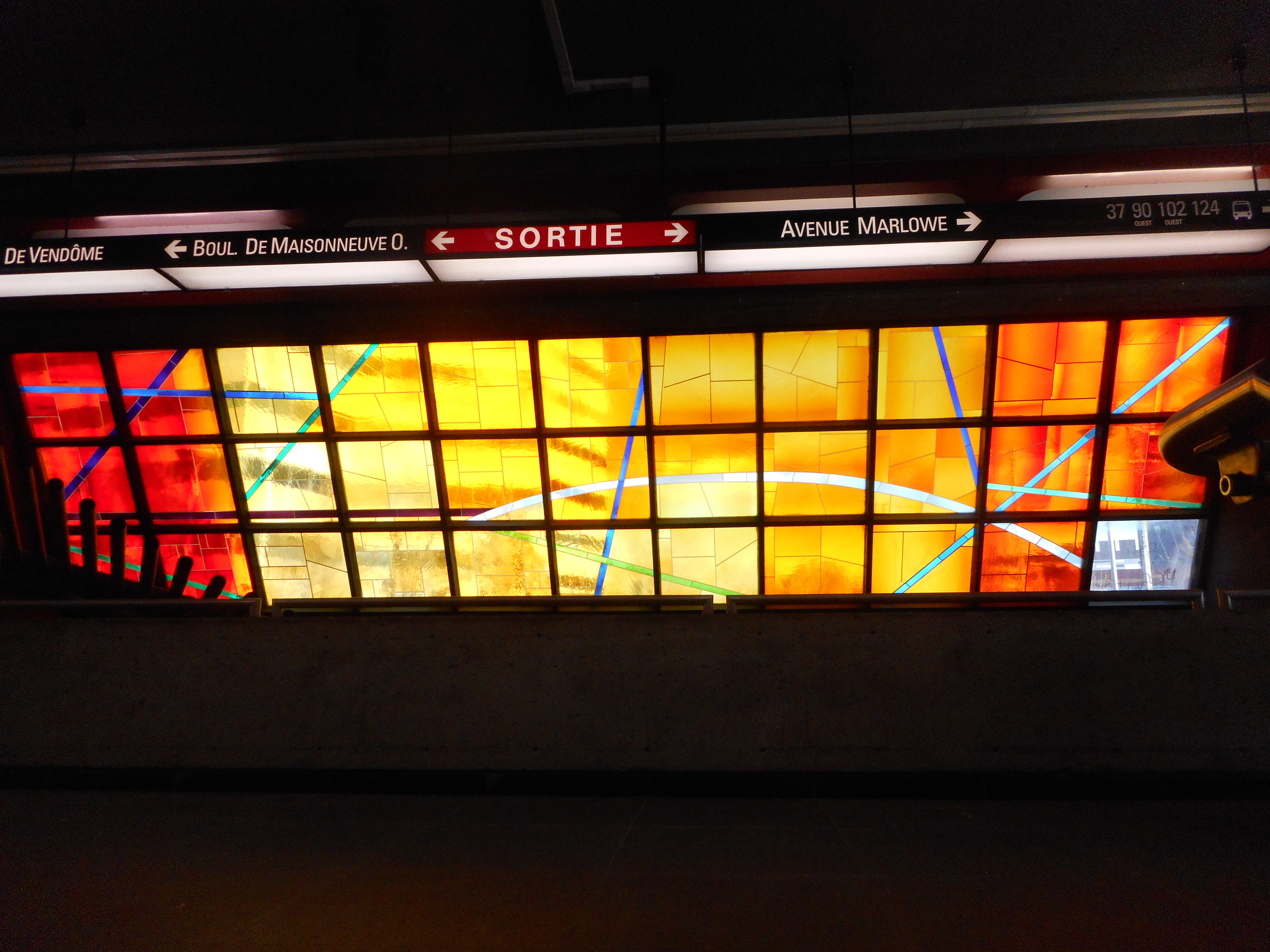
Stained glass window by artist Marcelle Ferron

The station features two artworks. The first artwork is by Quebec artist Marcelle Ferron, and consists of a stained-glass window and a stainless steel sculpture over the tracks. It was installed when the station first opened. The second artwork was installed as part of the work to make the station accessible in the mid 2010s. It comprises a set of three ceramic mosaics, by artist Patrick Bernatchez. It is located in the east entrance of the station.

== Origin of the name ==
This station is named for avenue de Vendôme, in turn possibly named for the French Dukes of Vendôme.

== Commuter rail station ==
Vendôme
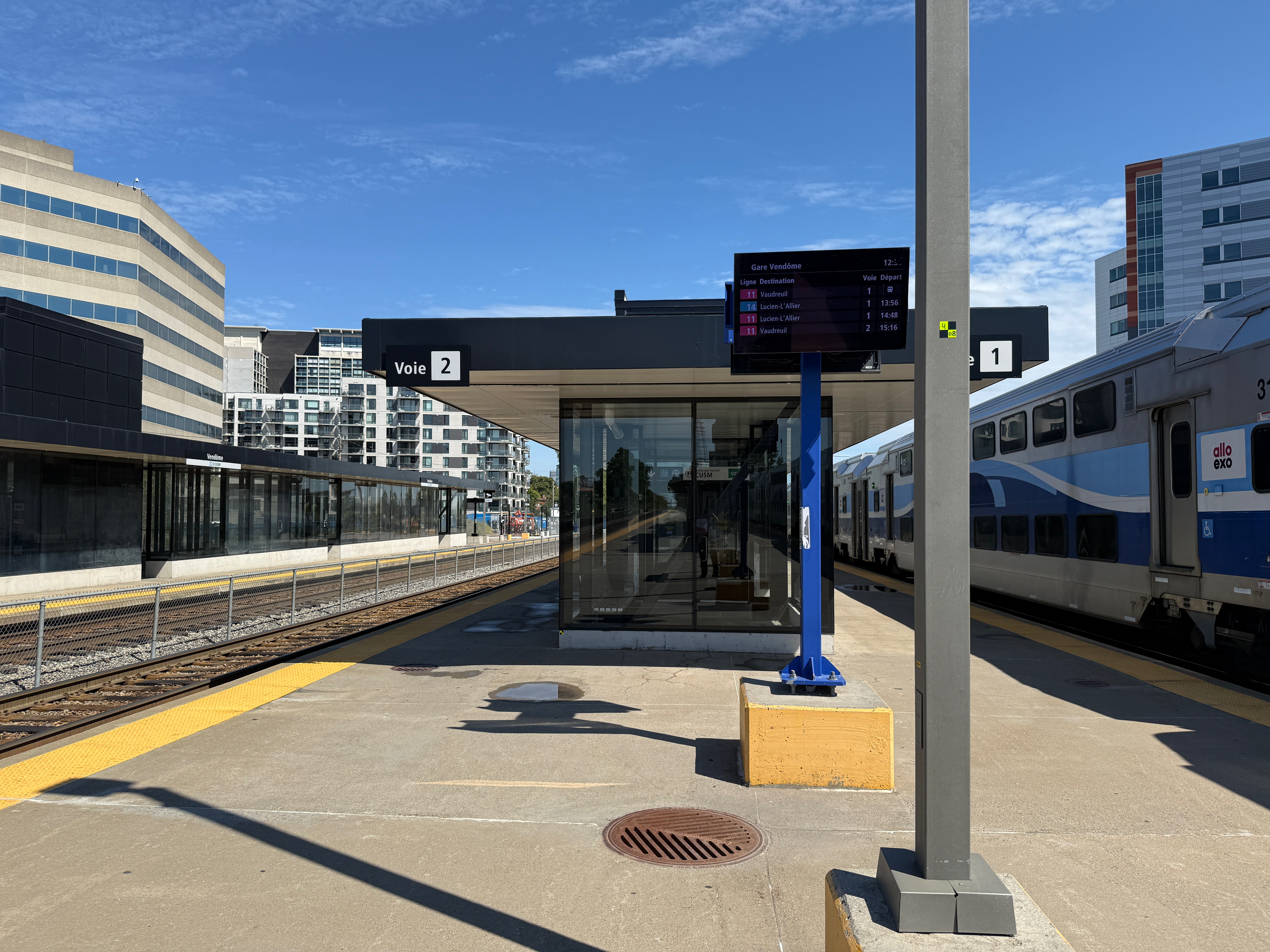
- Train station platforms and waiting areas

General information
- Location: 5160 De Maisonneuve Blvd. West, Montreal, Quebec H4A 3S9
- Operator: Exo
- Platforms: 1 side platform, 1 island platform
- Tracks: 3
- Connections: Orange Line; STM bus

Construction
- Structure type: At-grade
- Parking: None
- Cycle facilities: None
- Accessible: Platforms only, trains not accessible

Other information
- Fare zone: ARTM: A
- Website: Line 11 - Vendôme station (exo.quebec)

History
- Opened: 1983

Passengers
- 2019: Vaudreuil-Hudson: 1,581,800; Saint-Jérôme: 269,500; Candiac: 611,200; Total: 2,462,500 (Exo)

Services
| Preceding station | Exo | Following station |
|---|---|---|
| Montréal-Ouest toward Hudson | Line 11 – Vaudreuil–Hudson | Lucien-L'Allier Terminus |
| Montréal-Ouest toward Saint-Jérôme | Line 12 – Saint-Jérôme | Lucien-L'Allier Terminus |
| Montréal-Ouest toward Candiac | Line 14 – Candiac | Lucien-L'Allier Terminus |
Track layout
Location

Vendôme station is a commuter rail station operated by Exo in Montreal, Quebec, Canada. It is located in the Notre-Dame-de-Grâce area of the Côte-des-Neiges–Notre-Dame-de-Grâce borough, and is served by the Vaudreuil-Hudson, Saint-Jérôme and Candiac Lines. The station is connected by a pedestrian tunnel to the Montreal Metro's Vendôme station.

The station originally had two tracks (and two side platforms), but in 2015, a third track running between Montreal West and Downtown Montreal's Lucien-L'Allier station was added for improved service, and platform 2 was rebuilt as a wider island platform so trains running on the new track could call at the station as well.

The station is in the ARTM's Fare Zone A. Prior to the reform of the ARTM's fare system in July 2022, it was in zone 1.

== Connecting bus routes ==
Société de transport de Montréal
| No. | Route | Connects to | Service times / notes |
|---|---|---|---|
| 17 | Décarie | Place-Saint-Henri; Snowdon; Namur; De La Savane; Du Collège; Côte-Vertu | Daily |
| 38 | De l'Église | De l'Église; LaSalle | Daily |
| 90 | Saint-Jacques | Atwater; Du Canal | Daily |
| 102 | Somerled | | Daily |
| 104 | Cavendish | Atwater | Daily |
| 105 | Sherbooke | Montréal-Ouest | Daily |
| 124 | Victoria | Côte-Sainte-Catherine; Plamondon; Côte-de-Liesse | Daily |

== Nearby points of interest ==
- Complexe de santé Reine-Élisabeth
- Shadd Academy
- Centre Saint-Raymond
- Georges-Saint-Pierre Park
- McGill University Health Centre (MUHC)
- Shriners Hospital for Children – Canada
- Unitarian Church of Montréal
- Victoria Village, Westmount
