= Place Viger =

Railway station in Montreal, Quebec, Canada

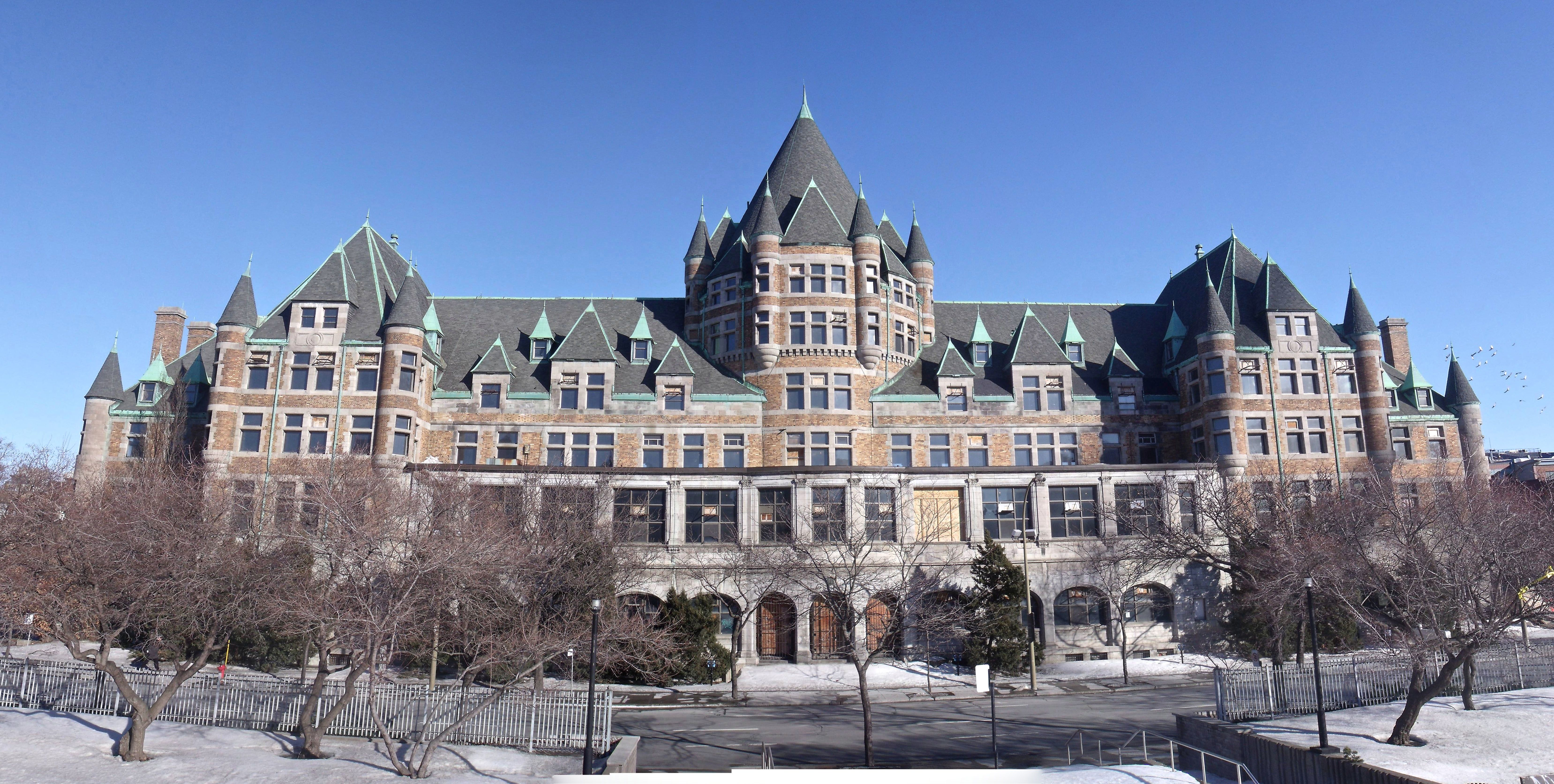
- Place Viger in 2014
- Interactive map of the Place Viger area
- Alternative names: Jacques-Viger Building; Viger Station; Viger Hotel

General information
- Architectural style: Châteauesque
- Coordinates: 45°30′45″N 73°33′12″W
- Construction started: 1898

Dimensions
- Other dimensions: Grounds: 38,317 m^{2} (412,440 sq ft)

Technical details
- Floor area: 10,219 m^{2} (110,000 sq ft)

Design and construction
- Architect: Bruce Price

Place Viger was both a grand hotel and railway station in Montreal, Quebec, Canada, constructed in 1898 and named after Jacques Viger, the first Mayor of the city. Although combined stations and hotels were common in the United Kingdom in the late 19th century, Place Viger was the only such combination in Canada.

Place Viger was designed by Bruce Price for the Canadian Pacific Railway, and was built near what was then the central core of Montreal, in proximity to the financial district, the city hall, the port and the court house. The mayor of Montreal, Raymond Préfontaine, strongly encouraged its construction in an area central to the French Canadian élites, in contrast to the rival Windsor Hotel to the west, which was perceived to cater to the city's anglophone classes. The rail station served as the terminus of the CP passenger rail lines running into downtown Montreal from the north and east. It replaced the older Dalhousie Station. Its counterpart terminus for CP passenger rail lines running into downtown Montreal from the south and west was Windsor Station.

Constructed in the French château-style common to railway hotels built by Canadian Pacific, Place Viger housed the railway station in its lower levels and a luxurious hotel on the upper floors. Place Viger enjoyed an enviable setting adjacent to the gardens of Viger Square, allowing both railway travellers and hotel guests to stroll along the garden paths.

The shifting of Montreal's commercial core to the northwest, and the onset of the economic depression of the 1930s, proved disastrous for Place Viger. The hotel closed in 1935. In 1951, the railway station also closed, and the building was sold to the City of Montreal. The interiors were gutted and transformed into undistinguished office space, and the building was renamed Édifice Jacques-Viger.

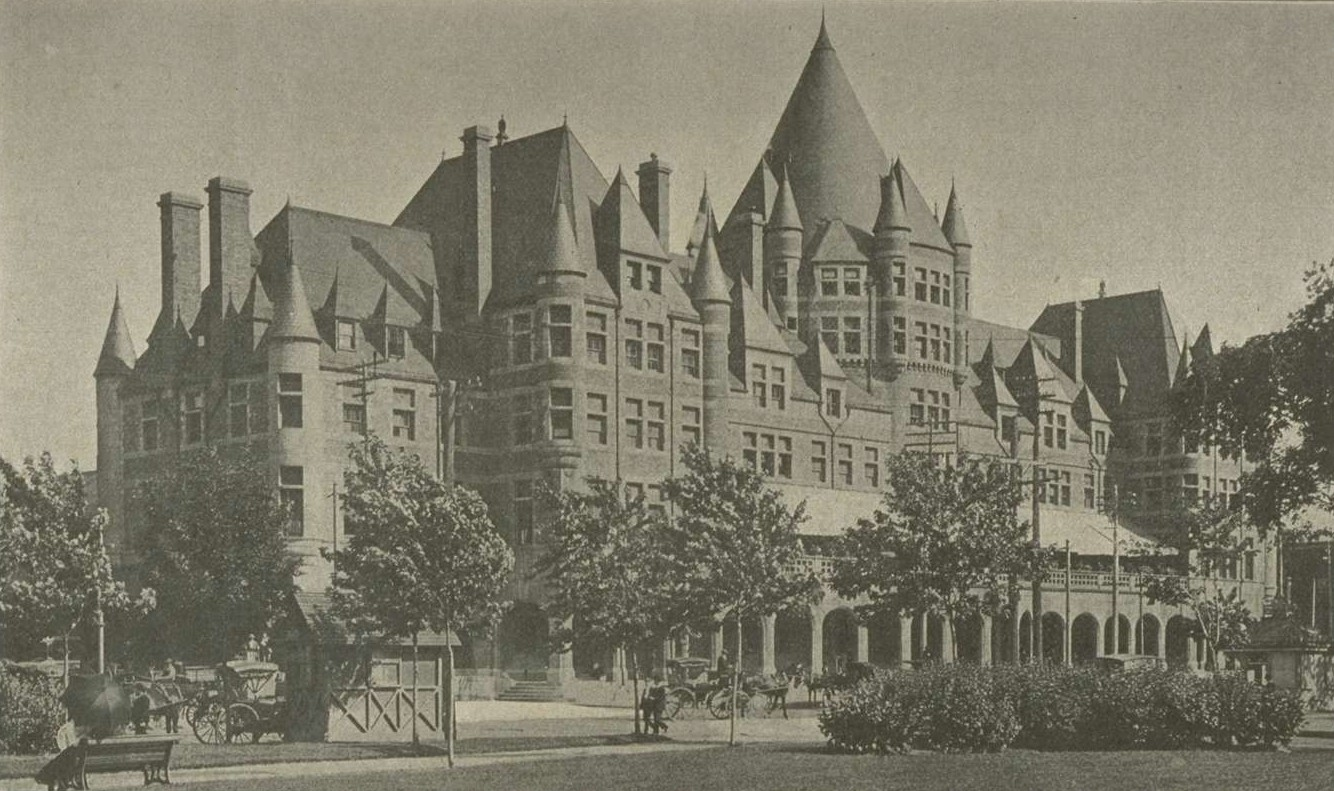
Place Viger, c. 1900

The Viger Square gardens were destroyed in the 1970s to allow for the construction of the Autoroute Ville-Marie highway. After the highway was completed, although a new Viger Square was created on the concrete deck covering the highway, it was poorly designed, desolate and underused, despite sculptural works by artists including Charles Daudelin. For decades, the old Place Viger station sat isolated and neglected, a striking historic building surrounded by parking lots and concrete.

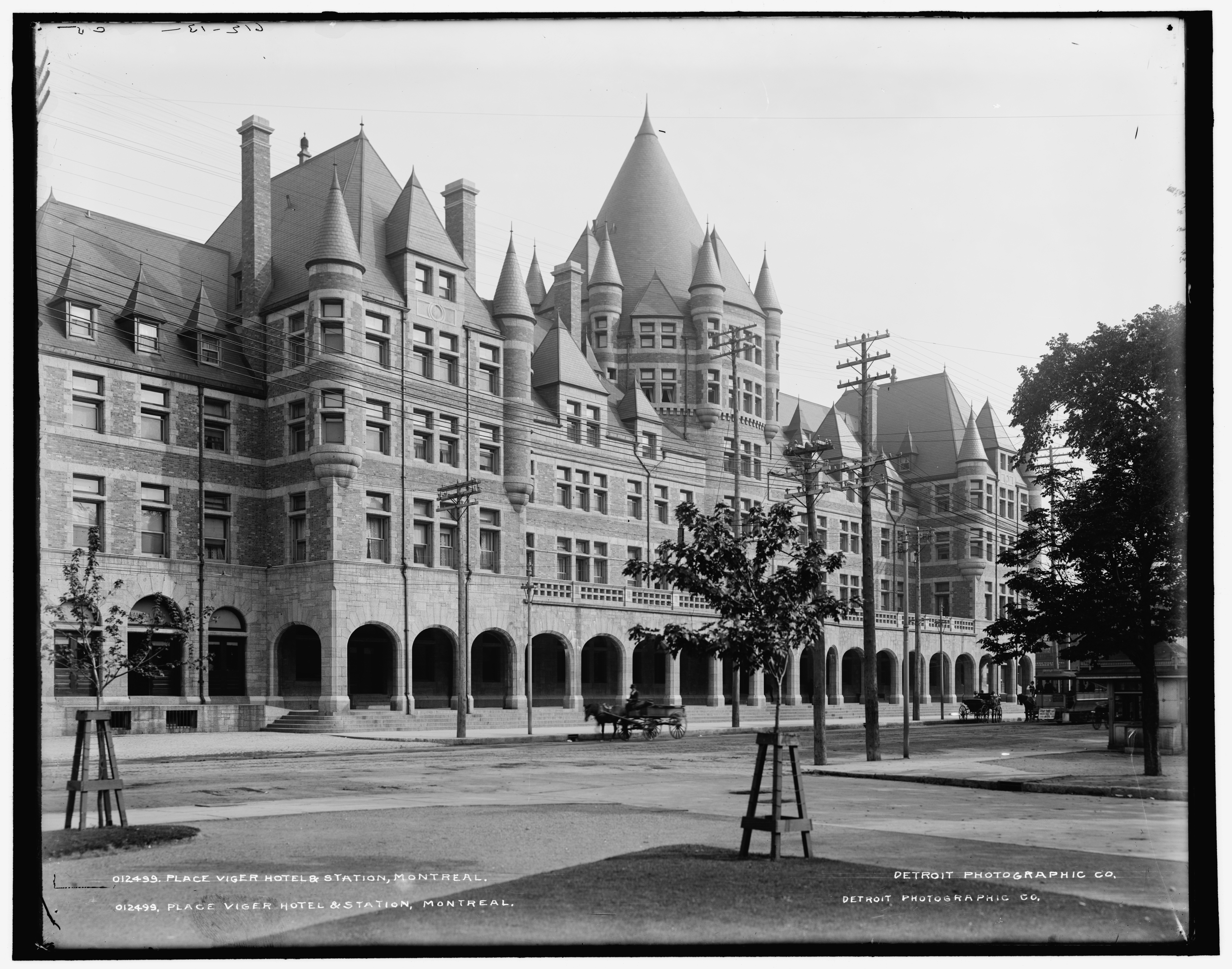
Detroit Publishing Co. glass negative, c. 1901

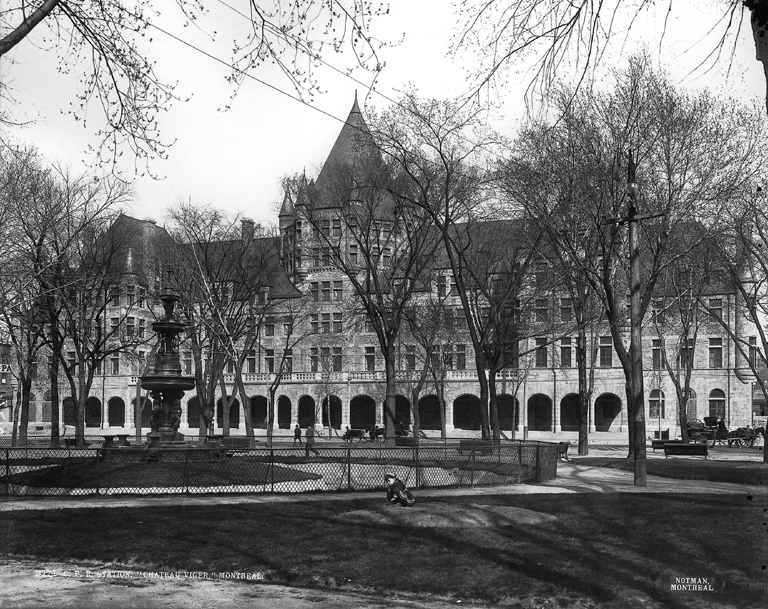
View from gardens, c. 1901

In 2003, the Commission scolaire de Montréal, the City of Montreal and the Quebec provincial government announced that Place Viger would house a new École des métiers du tourisme (a school of tourism). In 2004, the Borough of Ville-Marie announced that it would restore what remains of the nearby public gardens, by replacing much of the concrete in Viger Square with trees, paths and other soft landscaping.

Place Viger was sold in 2005 to a developer who intended to convert the building to apartments and a new hotel. However, the developer suffered financial difficulties and finally resold the property in 2012.

In May 2014, the new owner, real estate developer Jesta along with partners, announced a $250 million mixed-use redevelopment plan for the complex, including residential and office space. In September of that same year, software provider Lightspeed announced it would be moving its Montreal offices to the Viger complex. Lightspeed moved into the Viger castle in April 2015.

| Preceding station | Canadian Pacific Railway | Following station |
|---|---|---|
| Montreal Park Avenue toward Mont-Laurier | Montreal – Mont-Laurier | Terminus |
| Montreal Park Avenue toward Ottawa | Ottawa – Montreal via Montebello | Terminus |
