= Senate of Canada Building =

Government building in Ottawa, Ontario, Canada

Coordinates: 45.424525°N 75.693655°W

- Édifice du Sénat du Canada
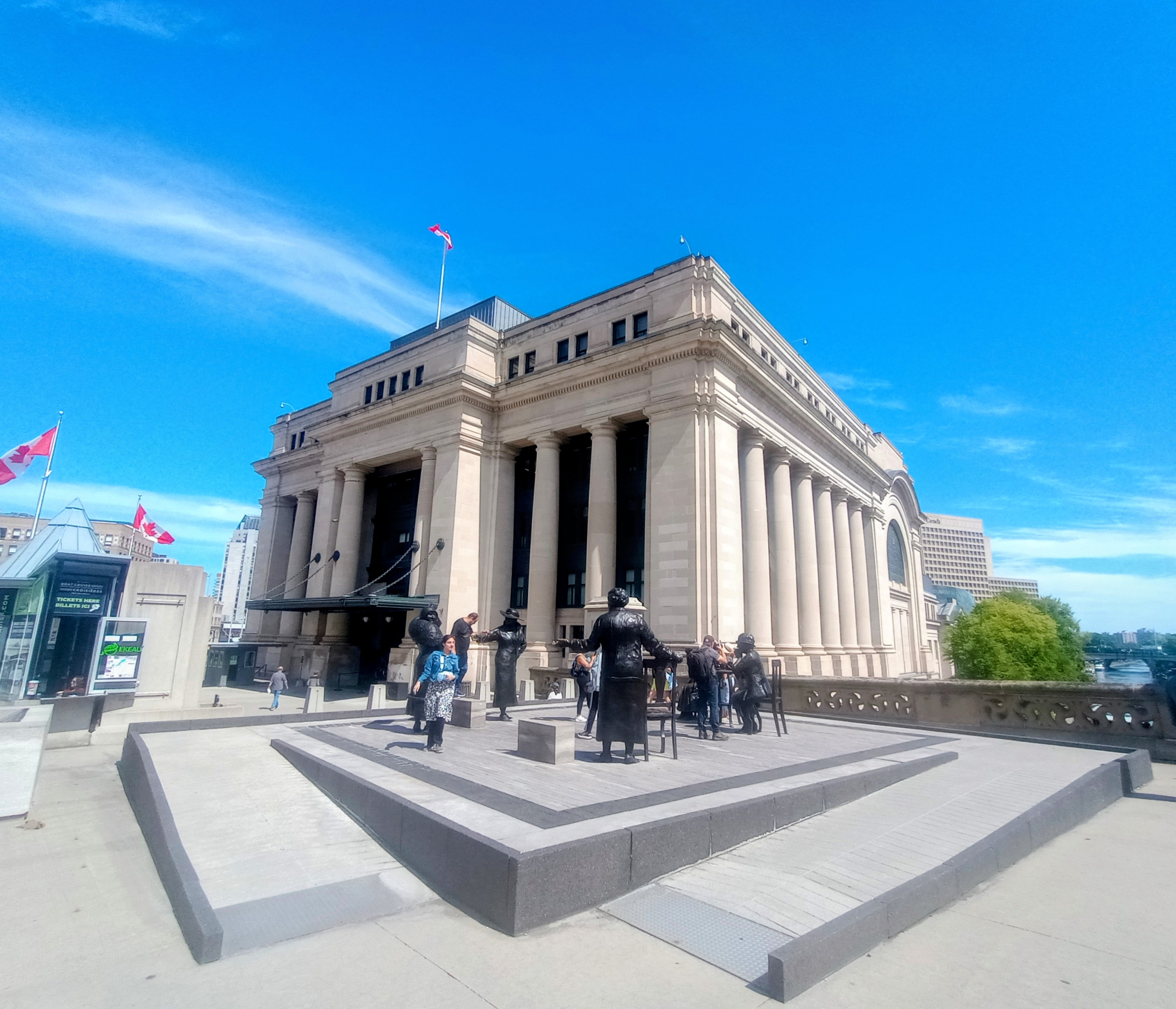
- View from Rideau Street
- Former names: Ottawa Central Station; Ottawa Union Station; Government Conference Centre

General information
- Type: Temporary legislative building
- Architectural style: Beaux-Arts
- Location: 2 Rideau Street, Ottawa, Ontario, Canada
- Current tenants: Senate of Canada
- Opened: 1912
- Renovated: 2018
- Renovation cost: $269 million
- Client: Grand Trunk Railway
- Owner: Government of Canada

Technical details
- Floor area: 7,387.7 square metres (79,521 sq ft)

Design and construction
- Architect: Bradford Gilbert
- Designations: Classified Federal Heritage Building

Renovating team
- Renovating firm: Diamond Schmitt Architects; KWC Architects
- Main contractor: PCL Construction

Website
- The Senate of Canada Building

The Senate of Canada Building (French: édifice du Sénat du Canada) is a government building and former railway station that serves as the temporary seat of the Senate of Canada. Located at 2 Rideau Street in downtown Ottawa, it was known as Ottawa Union Station and served as the city's central railway station from 1912 until 1966. From 1966 to 2018, it was operated by the Government of Canada as the Government Conference Centre. The building currently includes a temporary Senate chamber (housed in the concourse of the former railway station), as well as some Senate offices and committee rooms (in the waiting room of the former station).

It is situated at the intersection of Wellington Street and the Rideau Canal, across the street from the Château Laurier hotel (which was constructed around the same time). It is 600 metres (2,000 ft) from Parliament Hill and Confederation Square.

== History ==
=== History of Railways in Ottawa ===
Before the turn of the twentieth century, several railway companies had run lines into the city and had begun to build railway stations. In chronological order:

1. New Edinburgh: Bytown and Prescott Railway
2. Broad Street: Canada Central Railway, QMO&O: 1870, 1881, 1896, 1900
3. Elgin Street: Canada Atlantic Railway: early 1880s
4. Nicholas Street at Mann Avenue: Ottawa and New York Railway: 1895

Broad Street, in the Lebreton Flats area, was the site of several stations including the first Union station (1881), which perished by fire in 1896 and again in 1900 and was rebuilt each time. The last one closed in 1920. Broad Street was near the Prince of Wales Bridge, the link to Montreal via the north shore of the Ottawa River. Broad Street itself no longer exists, erased as part of the National Capital Commission's efforts at improving the capital area.

Ottawa became part of the Canadian Pacific Railway's transcontinental rail service on June 28, 1886, when the first Pacific Express arrived at Broad Street from Montreal via Lachute and Hull, Quebec, on its way to Sudbury, Winnipeg, Calgary, and Port Moody, B.C. It used the existing Prince of Wales Bridge to cross the Ottawa River near the site of the present-day O-Train Bayview Station, west of Parliament Hill. This rail bridge had been built in 1880 by the Quebec, Montreal, Ottawa and Occidental Railway and was transferred to Canadian Pacific in 1882.

However, there was no centrally located station until 1895, through efforts of John Rudolphus Booth. Booth was a Canadian lumber baron known for creating Canada's largest sawmill right in Ottawa, near Chaudière Falls. His mill's capacity exceeded the distribution infrastructure, and he looked to rail as a solution. (Eighteen years previous, he had established the Canada Atlantic Railway.) Booth had built a central depot in 1895 just south of Rideau Street, on the east side of the canal and reachable by way of a covered stairway from Sappers Bridge. The station seemed to not be truly serving the needs of the railway companies, since it was built for the interests of the Canada Atlantic Railway.

CPR's Royal Alexandra Interprovincial Bridge built in 1901 became the second railway bridge to cross the Ottawa River between Ottawa and Hull. It led to Booth's central depot. In 1905, Booth sold the Canada Atlantic Railway to the Grand Trunk Railway.

In 1910, the Grand Trunk was apportioned part of the Rideau Canal in order to build a new station and hotel. The hotel would become the famous Chateau Laurier, and the station would become Ottawa's Union Station.

=== Construction of Union Station ===
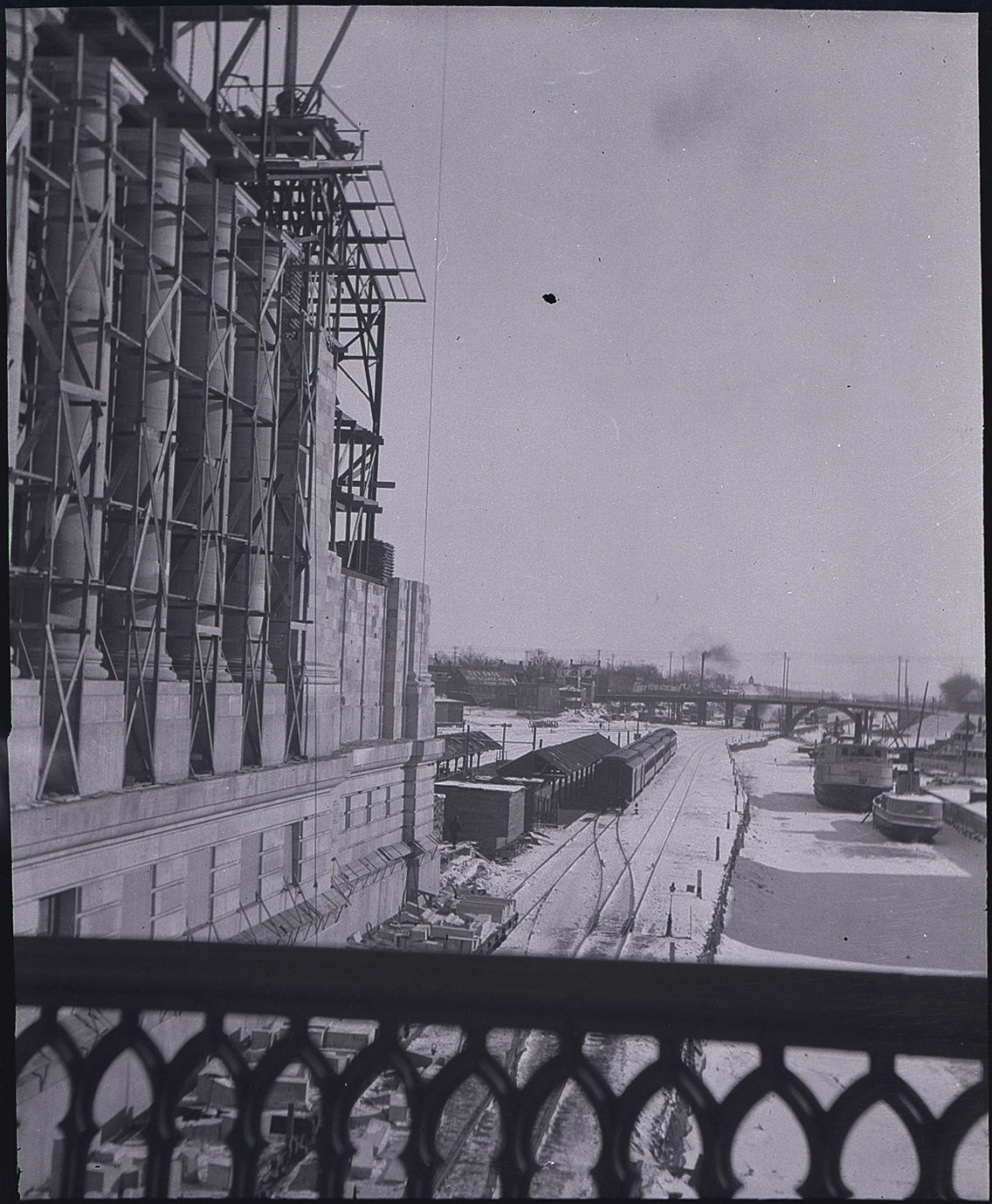
Construction of Union Station, next to the Rideau Canal, 1910

The building was opened by the Grand Trunk Railway in 1912 as Ottawa's central railway station, and the hotel was built across the street to serve travelers. A tunnel under Rideau Street links the station and the hotel. Over the course of the following years, passenger services of other railways moved to this station, thereby clarifying and unifying passenger travel in the city. When the last Canadian Pacific trains moved from the old Union Station on Broad Street to Grand Trunk Central station on January 4, 1920, the old station was closed and the Grand Trunk station became Ottawa Union Station.

The June 1912 opening of the Union Station and the Chateau Laurier was not met with much fanfare, since Grand Trunk Railway general manager Charles Melville Hays had just died in the Titanic disaster two months previously.

The Doric Roman Revival multi-pillar Union station was originally designed by New York-based architect Bradford Lee Gilbert who was eventually dismissed due to concerns of mismanagement. The Montreal firm of Ross and MacFarlane took over the project, making many design changes to the station. Ross and MacFarlane also took over the design of the Château Laurier and later built Toronto's Union Station.

Both Canadian National Railways (successor to the Grand Trunk) and Canadian Pacific Railway operated regularly scheduled passenger trains through the facility until it ceased operations on July 31, 1966.

Preceding station	Canadian National Railway	Following station
Ottawa Bank Street toward Vancouver	Main Line	Carlsbad Springs toward Montreal
Terminus	Montreal – Ottawa; Semi-local stops	Carlsbad Springs toward Montreal
Ottawa Bank Street toward Napanee	Napanee – Ottawa	Terminus
Graham Bay toward Barrys Bay	Barrys Bay – Ottawa	Terminus
Preceding station	Canadian Pacific Railway	Following station
Carleton Place toward Vancouver	Main Line	Montreal West toward Montreal Windsor
Terminus	Ottawa – Montreal; Short Line	Blackburn toward Montreal Windsor
Terminus	Ottawa – Montreal via Montebello	Hull toward Montreal Place Viger
Terminus	Ottawa – Prescott	Billings toward Prescott
Hull toward Waltham	Waltham – Ottawa	Terminus
Hull toward Maniwaki	Maniwaki – Ottawa	Terminus
Hull toward Brockville	Brockville – Ottawa	Terminus
Hull toward Chalk River	Chalk River – Ottawa	Terminus
Preceding station	New York Central Railroad	Following station
Terminus	Ottawa Division	Finch toward Tupper Lake Junction

=== Connection to railways ===
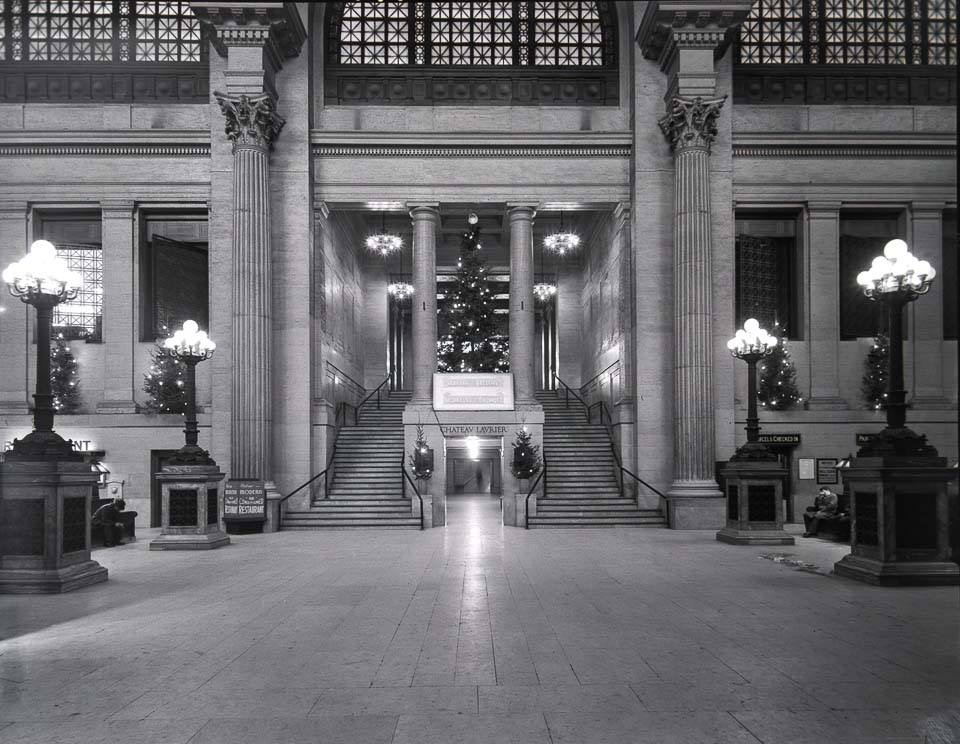
Union Station Lobby in 1950s

Several tracks which originated from the main railway infrastructure in Ottawa ran immediately adjacent to the Rideau Canal (right on its east banks) and led northward into the city. They approached Union Station through several sheds. From the sheds, emerged two tracks (on the east side of the Rideau Canal), and continued along, proceeding under the bridge where Wellington Street crosses the canal. They then ran immediately adjacent to the west side of Chateau Laurier, in a structure which was used for a time in a converted form, by the Canadian Museum of Contemporary Photography. The track continued, where there is now a paved road and ran to the Alexandra (Interprovincial) Bridge.

Once in Hull, there was the possibility to continue to other parts of Quebec, or to return to Ottawa by making a turn and returning over the Prince of Wales Bridge. Some of the pathways in present-day Gatineau are on locations where rails had once made this possible.

=== Post-1966 ===
In 1966, the National Capital Commission decided to remove the tracks along the east side of the Canal as part of an urban renewal plan. They were replaced by a scenic drive, and a new Ottawa station was built just east of Ottawa's downtown area in the neighbourhood of Eastway Gardens. While the NCC had originally planned to tear down the structure, it was spared, becoming the centre of Canada's centennial celebrations in 1967. After sitting empty for many years, it was turned into the Government Conference Centre. A new entrance and canopy at the rear of the building was built to provide greater security for the Commonwealth Heads of Government Meeting held in 1973. The same year, artist Bruce Garner sculpted bronze doors for the new entrance, titled Reflections of Canada. The tracks and sheds south of the station were demolished and now taken over by Colonel By Drive and the Rideau Centre.

It had since been home to many gatherings of civil servants and politicians. In 1981, a pivotal meeting of federal justice minister Jean Chrétien and provincial justice ministers Roy McMurtry and Roy Romanow in the kitchen of the conference centre struck what was called the "Kitchen Accord" about the patriation of the Constitution of Canada. In 2001, the building hosted the G20 conference, a gathering of 20 finance ministers from around the world.

As well as hosting conferences, the building was also sometimes used as a gallery. A section of the Berlin Wall was on display inside the main entrance from September 27, 1991, until January 29, 2011. Because the location of the display was not widely publicized, it was decided that the segment would be more prominent at its new location in the Canadian War Museum.

=== Architecture ===
The building is inspired by the Beaux-Arts architectural style. The main departures hall (now the main conference area) is based on the Great Hall of the Roman Baths of Caracalla at 3/4 scale. It is therefore similar to the now-destroyed departures hall of New York Penn Station.

The cavernous structure has never been well suited to its role as a conference centre. In the mid-1990s a proposal was made to turn it into the new home for the Canadian Sports Hall of Fame, but these plans fell through. In his final year in office, Prime Minister Jean Chrétien announced that the building would become home to a new museum of Canadian political history, but incoming Prime Minister Paul Martin cancelled this project, and it has remained a conference centre.

In 2007, the idea of reverting the building back to its original use sprang up as Ottawa considered various proposals for regional commuter rail systems. It is seen as being feasible to do so (although it would require a long tunnel to reconnect to the existing railway tracks) ; however, the Government of Canada's Department of Public Works says the building is not for sale.

=== Temporary Senate of Canada building ===
In July 2013, it was announced by Public Works Canada that the building would be used to temporarily accommodate the Senate chamber (in the main concourse of the old train station) along with 21 Senate offices and three committee rooms (in the old general waiting room) while the Centre Block undergoes major rehabilitation work projected to take up to ten years. It was decided that the need to rehabilitate this historical building presented a perfect opportunity to find an interim home for the Senate. The works included:

- seismic reinforcement;
- restoration of the masonry;
- replacement of roofing materials including skylights, replacement of obsolete electrical, mechanical and life safety systems to meet current codes;
- renovation of the interior space;
- removal of outdated conference amenities added in the 1960s (i.e. translation booths);
- conformity to universal accessibility requirements;
- abatement of hazardous materials; and
- expansion of the loading dock, to improve serviceability limitations of the building.

In February 2019, the Senate of Canada Building formally re-opened in its current role.

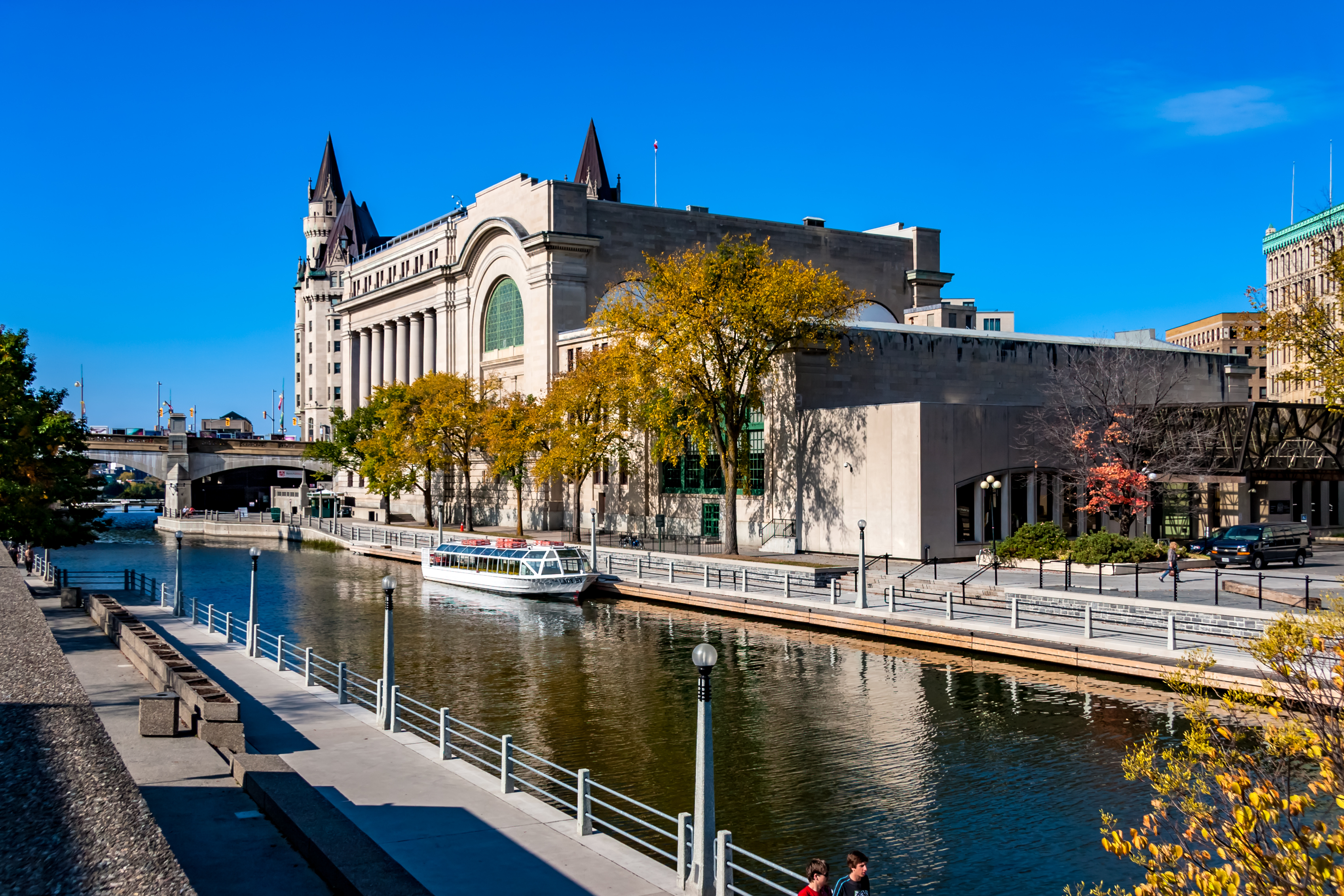
The Senate of Canada Building faces Rideau Canal

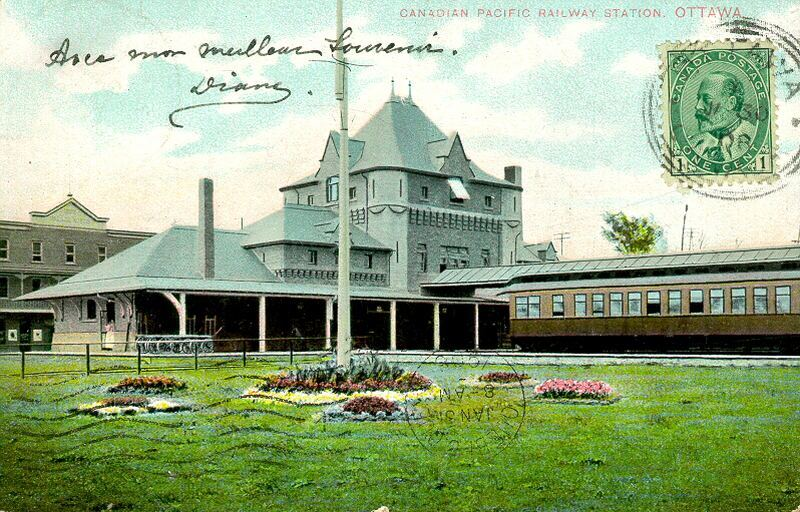
Broad Street Station, 1908, replaced a station lost in the great 1900 Hull–Ottawa fire

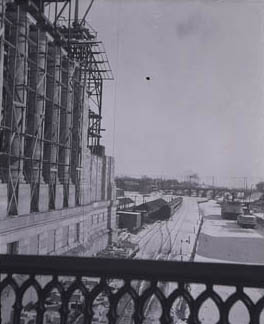
Construction of the station with view of railway lines and the Rideau Canal

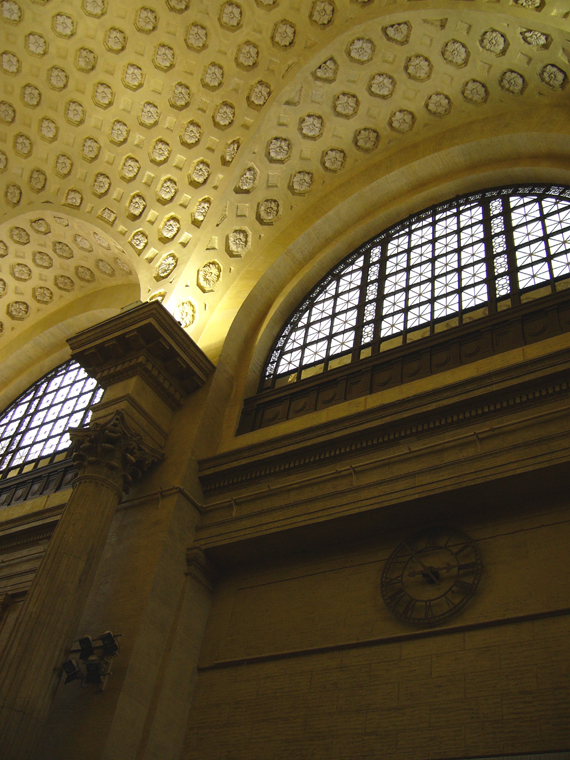
Interior view of Waiting Room, which was inspired by the Baths of Caracalla

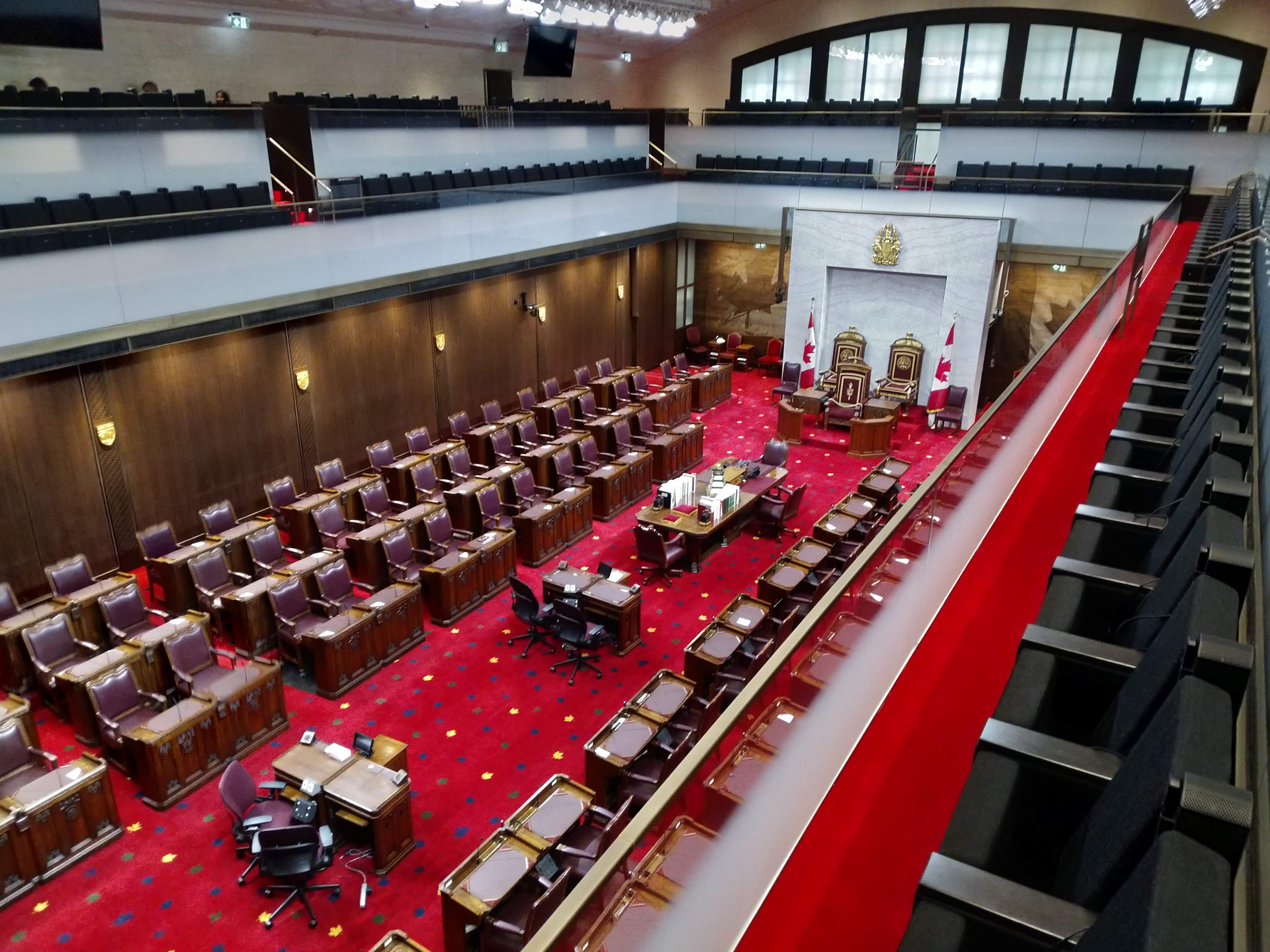
Temporary chamber, in use while Centre Block undergoes renovations

== See also ==
- Ottawa station, the station opened in 1966 to replace Ottawa Union Station
