= De la Gauchetière Street =

Street in Montreal, Canada

Coordinates: 45°30′30″N 73°33′35″W

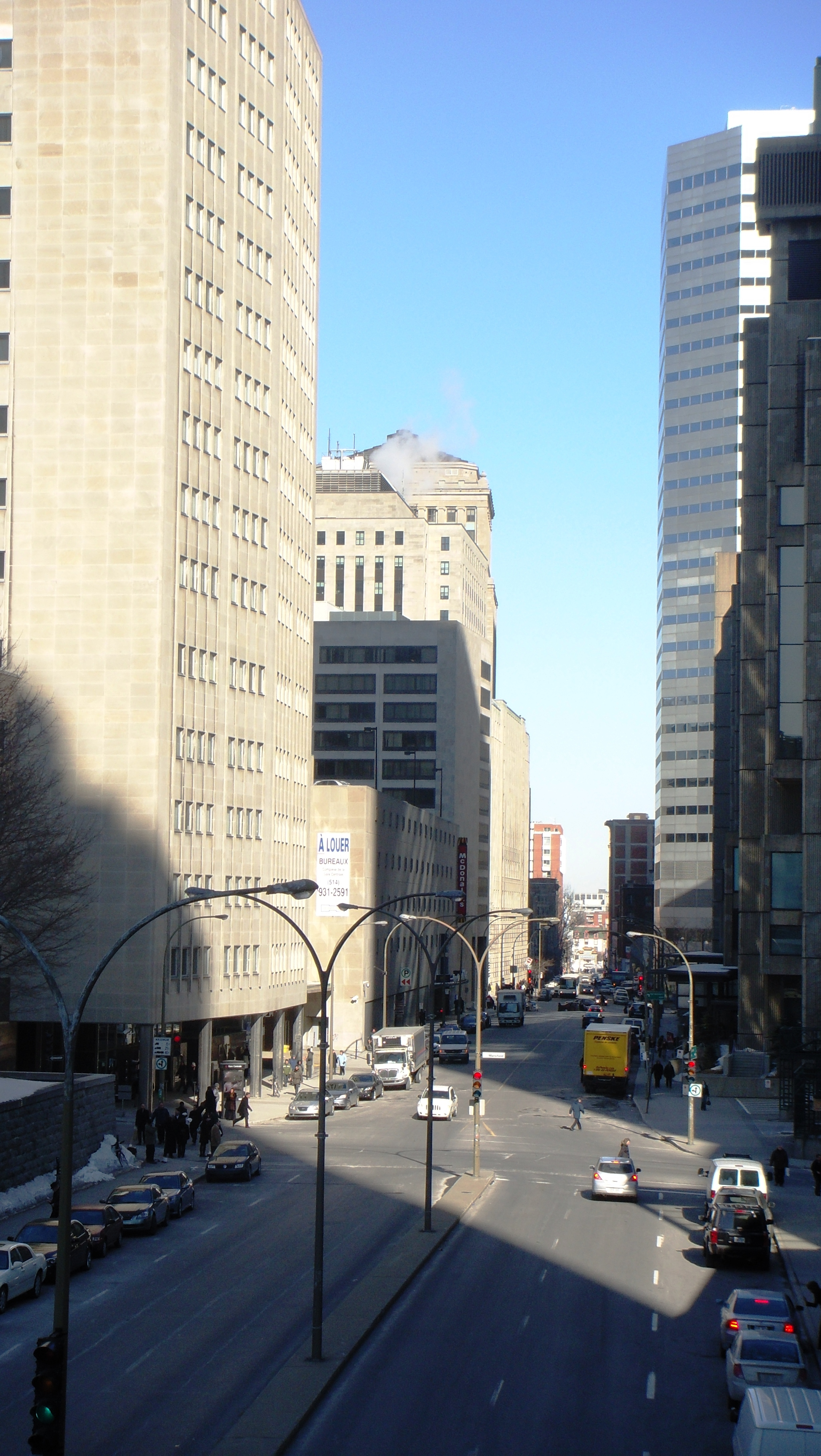
- Interactive map of De la Gauchetière Street
- Native name: rue de la Gauchetière (French)
- Length: 2.2 km (1.4 mi)
- Location: Montreal
- West end: R-112 Peel Street
- East end: Wolfe Street

Construction
- Inauguration: 1954

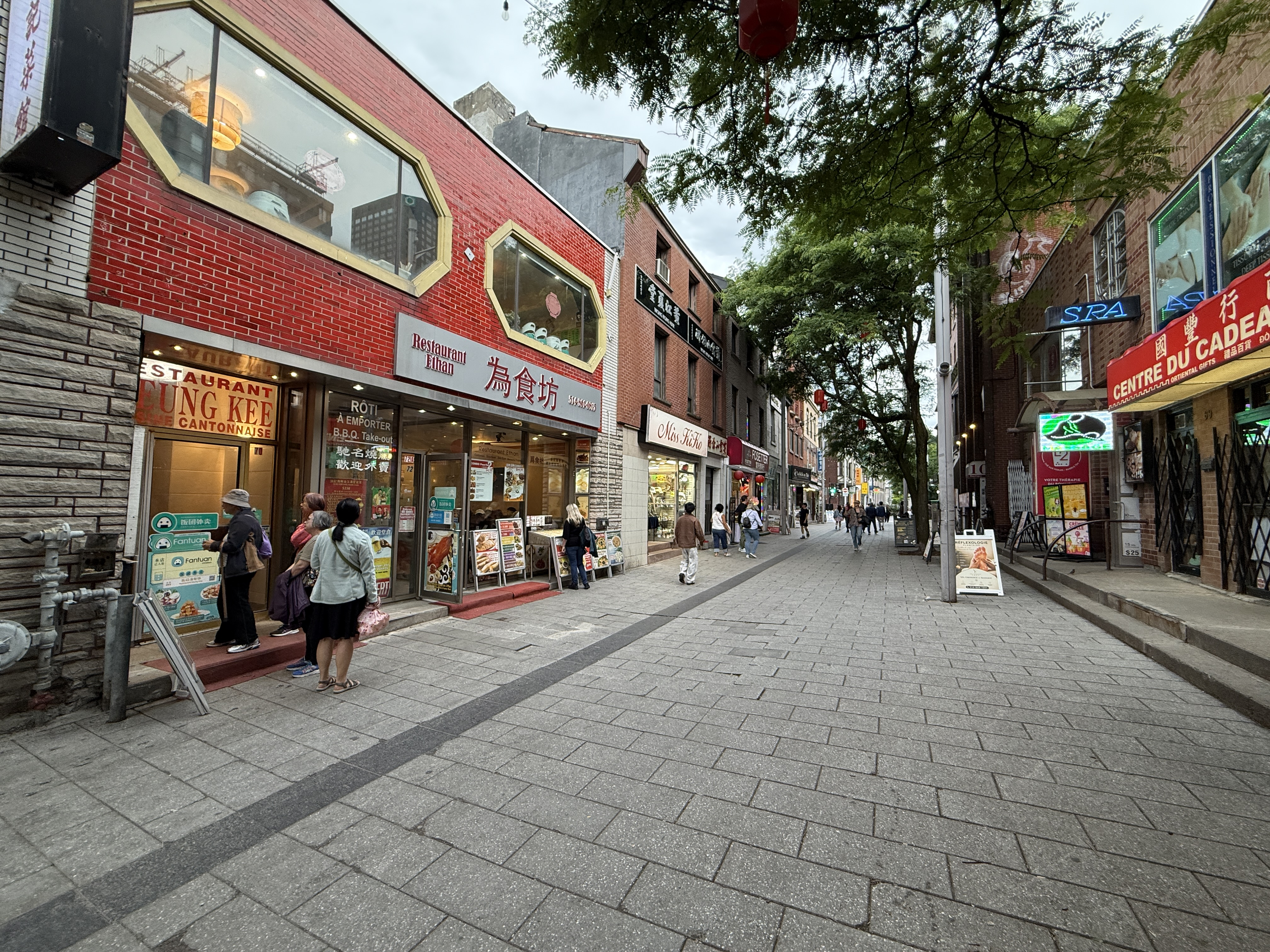
De la Gauchetière Street and Saint Urbain Street in Chinatown.

De la Gauchetiere Street (officially in French: rue De La Gauchetière) is a street in Montreal, Quebec, Canada, running through downtown Montreal, the International District and Chinatown.

In Chinatown, it takes the form of a pedestrian zone, between Saint Laurent Boulevard and Jeanne Mance Street. The block fronting the Bell Centre (between Peel Street and Mountain Street) has been renamed avenue des Canadiens-de-Montréal since 2009 as a part of the Montreal Canadiens centennial campaign.

== Points of interest ==
The street runs through downtown Montreal and is home to such landmarks as Place Bonaventure, the 1000 de la Gauchetière skyscraper and the Château Champlain. De la Gauchetiere also forms the southern edge of Place du Canada.

Central Station, one of Montreal's two main railway stations, is located on the street. The other, Lucien L'Allier station, is located on the short section that was renamed. The historic Windsor Station is also located on the part that was renamed, but it is no longer used for train service due to the Bell Centre occupying the area where the tracks were located.

== Etymology ==
The name has been unofficially translated variously as "La Gauchetière Street" (such as inside the elevator in Windsor Station) and "Gauchetière Street". It is named after the landowner Joseph-Daniel Migeon, also called the Sieur de la Gauchetière in honour of his mother, Catherine Gauchet.

== See also ==
- Avenue des Canadiens-de-Montréal (French)
