= Windsor Station (Montreal) =

- Gare Windsor
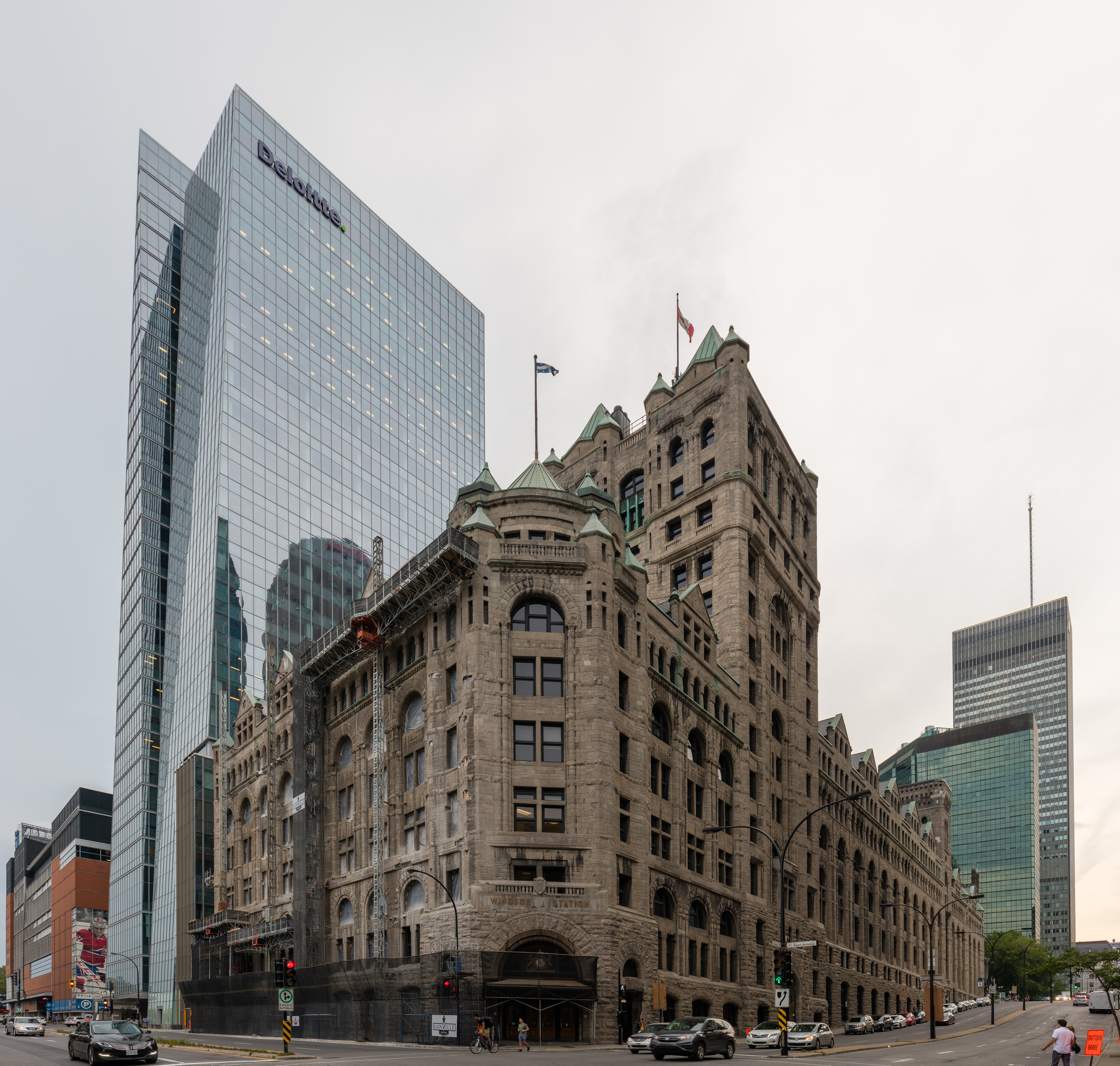
- Windsor Station in 2017
- Interactive map of the Windsor Station area

General information
- Type: Office building, and formerly train station
- Architectural style: Richardsonian Romanesque
- Location: Montreal, Quebec, Canada, 1160 Canadiens-de-Montréal avenue (formerly 1160 de la Gauchetière street) (concourse), 1100 Canadiens-de-Montréal avenue (offices)
- Coordinates: 45°29′50.86″N 73°34′7.18″W
- Construction started: 1887
- Completed: 1889, 1916
- Cost: CA$2 million (1888–89)
- Owner: Cadillac Fairview

Design and construction
- Architect: Bruce Price
- Awards: Heritage railway station (Historic Sites and Monuments Board of Canada)

National Historic Site of Canada
- Official name: Windsor Station (Canadian Pacific) National Historic Site of Canada
- Designated: 1975

Heritage Railway Station (Canada)
- Designated: 1990

Patrimoine culturel du Québec
- Type: Historic monument
- Designated: 2009

Windsor Station (French: Gare Windsor) is an office building and former railway station in Montreal, Quebec, Canada. It used to be the city's Canadian Pacific Railway (CPR) station, and served as the headquarters of CPR from 1889 to 1996. It is bordered by Avenue des Canadiens-de-Montréal to the north, Rue Peel to the east, Rue Saint-Antoine to the south and the Bell Centre to the west.

Windsor Station was designated a National Historic Site of Canada in 1975, and was designated a Heritage Railway Station in 1990, and a provincial historic monument in 2009.

The walls are gray limestone from a quarry in Montreal. Outside, the columns reach up to 2.1 metres (6.9 ft) wide.

== History ==
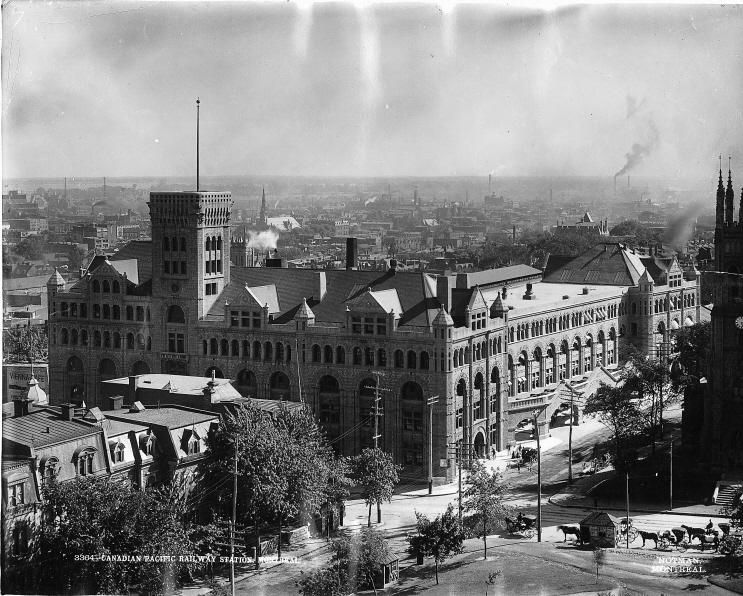
Windsor Station circa 1900

In 1887, the Canadian Pacific Railway (CPR) began to build a railway station in Montreal, which would serve as its headquarters, three years after the completion of the Dalhousie Station in 1884. The Windsor Station project was entrusted to New York City architect Bruce Price, who chose a Romanesque Revival style for the building. Price had to submit four versions of his plans to satisfy the treasurer of CPR, before the project was accepted. It was constructed at a cost of CA$300,000 (equivalent to $11,066,679 in 2025), and the first trains departed February 4, 1889. It was known as the Windsor Street Station, named for the street on which it was located, Windsor Street (today Peel Street).

It was expanded for the first time from 1900 to 1903, and again from 1910 to 1913 by Canadian architects. The third expansion, in 1916, included a fifteen-storey tower which dramatically altered Montreal's skyline. The project was entrusted to the firm of brothers Edward and William Maxwell.

Windsor Station formed an integral component of Dominion Square as a diffuser of passenger traffic and as a central terminus for other modes of transportation. The building skirted Windsor Street (today Peel Street) and Osborne Street (today Avenue des Canadiens-de-Montréal) between Donegani (located halfway between Osborne Street and Saint Antoine Street). The building had four floors up to Osborne Street and five floors at street-level on Donegani Street because of the slope of the terrain.

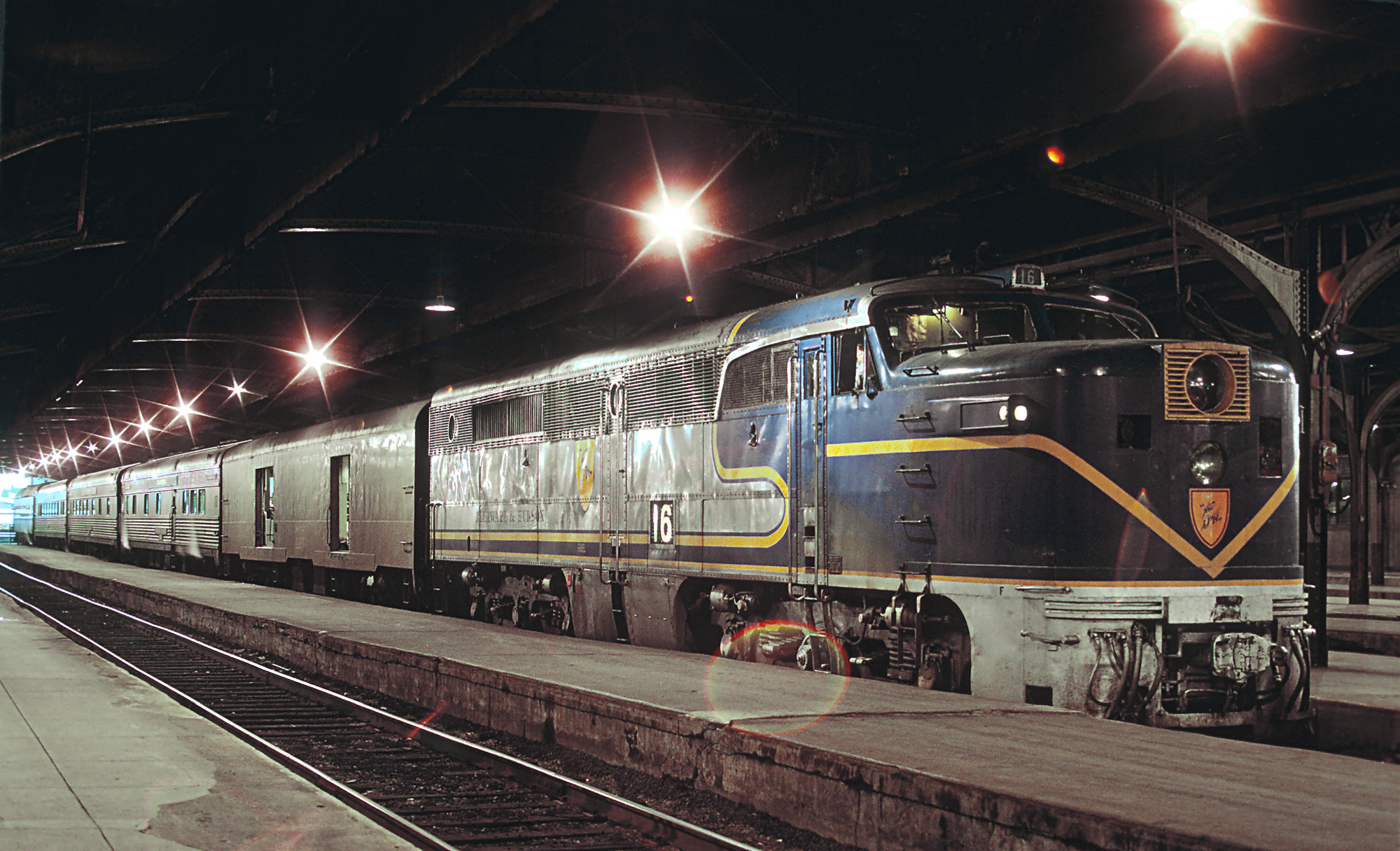
The Delaware and Hudson's Montreal Limited at Windsor Station on August 27, 1970

In July 1970, CPR announced its plans to demolish Windsor Station and build a 60-storey office building on the site. The building, which was going to cost CA$250 million, was to be designed by the same architects as New York City's World Trade Center. After several delays the project was abandoned.

Via Rail was created in 1978 and took over the responsibility for operating intercity passenger trains of both Canadian National CN and CPR. During Via's first months there was no operational change for CPR or CN trains, as they used their respective crews, routes, equipment and stations. However, by the summer of 1979, the integration process began, and most of Via's former CP trains that used Windsor Station were consolidated at CN's Central Station, including CP's former transcontinental passenger services such as The Atlantic Limited and The Canadian, both of which were also renamed to be bilingually appropriate. Via Dayliners (Budd Rail Diesel Cars) operating between Windsor Station and St. Sacrement station in Quebec City via the CP route north of the St. Lawrence River continued to use Windsor Station until 1984. Amtrak's daily Montreal-New York City train (the Adirondack) continued to use Windsor Station until 1986. Both the dayliners and the Adirondack were switched to Central Station. Local services to Ottawa via Montebello and to Mont-Laurier, both of which had been transferred from CPR to Via, continued to use Windsor Station until they were cancelled in 1981.

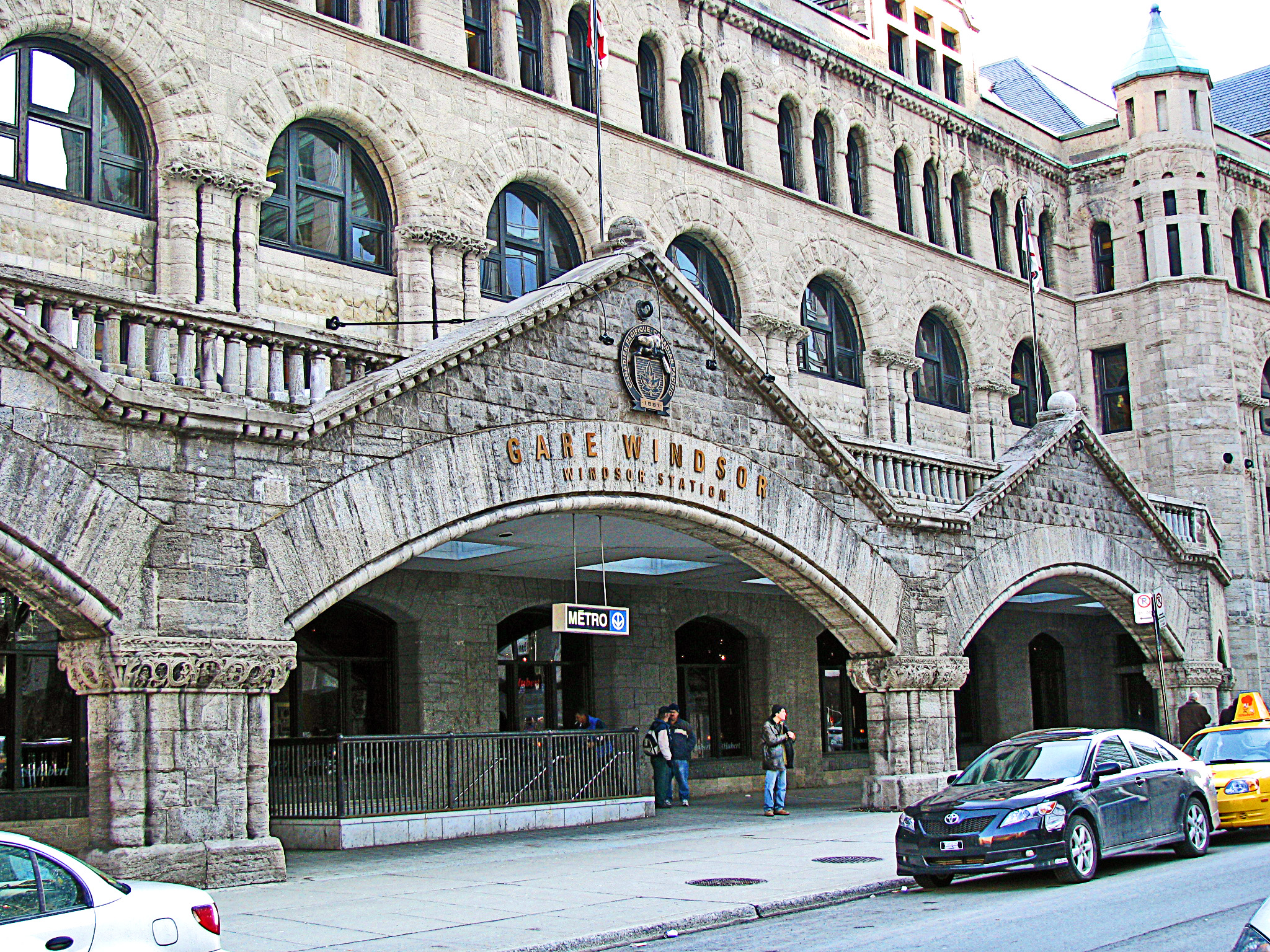
Entrance to Windsor Station in 2008

After intercity passenger service was removed, Windsor Station continued to be a commuter rail terminal for the STCUM's (now Exo's) Montréal/Dorion-Rigaud suburban train (now Vaudreuil-Hudson line). In 1999, service to Blainville (now Saint-Jérôme line) was added, and in 2001, service to Delson (now Candiac line).

In 1993, construction began on the Molson Centre (now Bell Centre), a hockey arena to replace the Montreal Forum. The arena site was located immediately west of Windsor Station on the trackage which served the station platforms, resulting in the historic station being severed from the rail network. The Molson Centre opened its doors on March 16, 1996, and the new Lucien-L'Allier station was opened at the western end of the arena structure to replace the now-closed suburban train terminal at Windsor Station. Until 2001, the new train station was called Terminus Windsor, but this was changed to reduce confusion with the original station building and to indicate a link to the Lucien-L'Allier metro (subway) station which is below the station building. It is still possible to walk through the Bell Centre to connect with Windsor Station and the Lucien L'Allier metro station.

Windsor Station, and now Lucien-L'Allier station (known in French as 'Terminus Lucien-L'Allier'), are at the eastern end of CPR's Westmount Subdivision. It served as CP's downtown west end train terminus. Its counterpart downtown east end terminus was Place Viger.

Windsor Station also housed the headquarters of CPR and its parent company Canadian Pacific Limited until, after a corporate restructuring in the mid-1990s, the railway abandoned or sold most of its trackage east of Montreal and focused its activities in Western Canada. In 1996, CP moved its headquarters to Gulf Canada Square in Calgary.

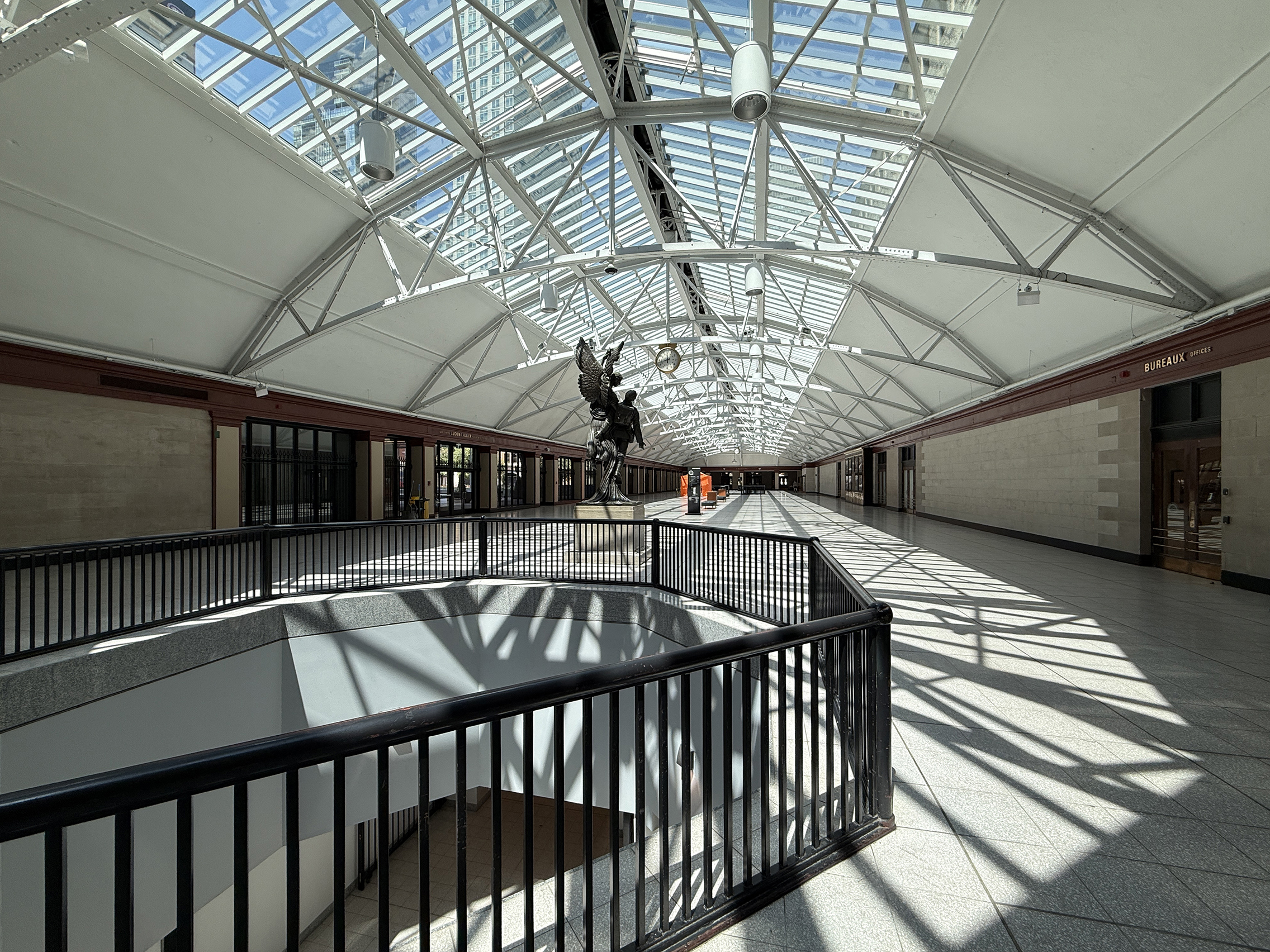
Windsor Station's main concourse in 2026

== Today ==
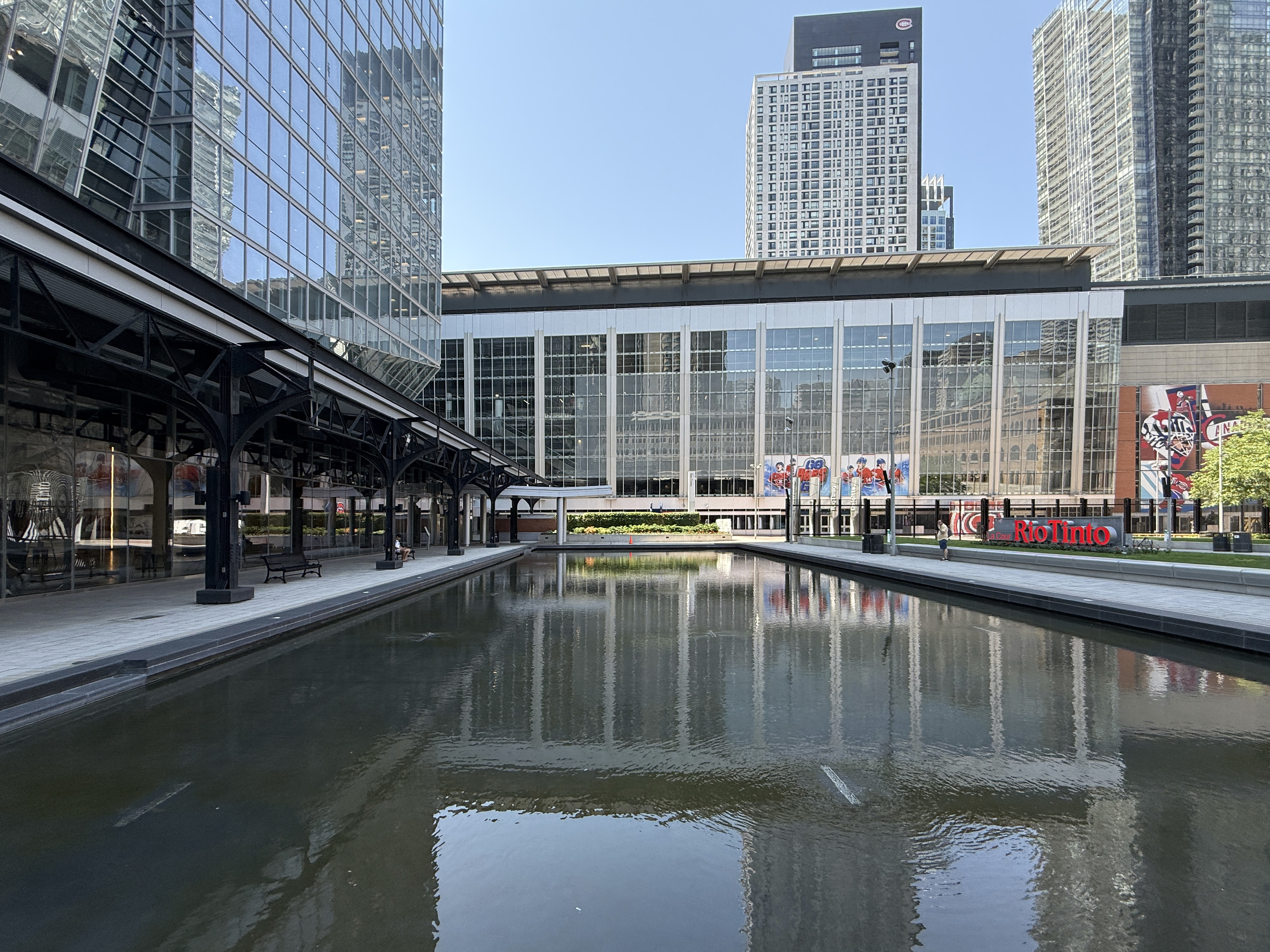
La Cour Rio Tinto Public park

Since 1993, the structure is no longer connected to the rail network. It was sold by CP to Cadillac Fairview in 2009 (thus removing it from the jurisdiction of the Heritage Railway Stations Protection Act; consequently, it was classified as a provincial heritage site that same year).

Also located in the station is the Canadian Railway Office of Arbitration.

The rest of Windsor Station has been redeveloped into an office complex and houses some restaurants and cafés. The interior concourse, which is open to the public, can be rented for private and public events. The lower floor is part of the RÉSO and connects the Bonaventure metro station with the Lucien-L'Allier commuter rail station as well as the Bell Centre. The 13 terminal tracks running into Windsor Station and the overhead canopy have been removed, and replaced by a public square.

== See also ==
- Angel of Victory, a statue in the station
- Drury's
- The Adirondack, the last intercity train to use this station

Preceding station	Canadian Pacific Railway	Following station
Westmount toward Vancouver	Main Line	Terminus
Westmount toward Quebec	Montreal – Quebec	Terminus
Westmount toward Ottawa	Ottawa – Montreal; Short Line	Terminus
Westmount toward Rigaud	Montreal – Rigaud local stops	Terminus
Westmount toward Detroit	Detroit – Montreal	Terminus
Westmount toward Wells River	Montreal – Wells River	Terminus
Westmount toward McAdam	Montreal – McAdam	Terminus
Preceding station	New York Central Railroad	Following station
Westmount toward Utica	Adirondack Division	Terminus
Preceding station	Amtrak	Following station
Westmount toward New York (Grand Central)	Adirondack Rerouted in 1983	Terminus
