= McAdam station =

Railway station in McAdam, New Brunswick, Canada

Coordinates: 45°35′25″N 67°19′44″W

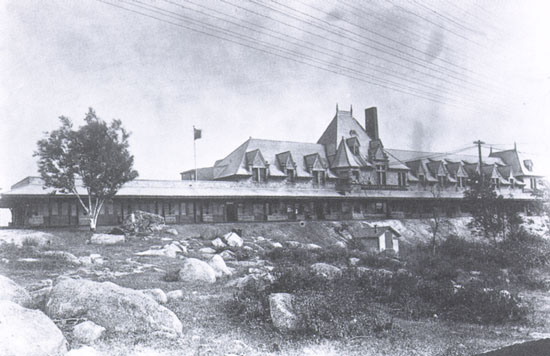
- Station after its inauguration in 1901
- Interactive map of the McAdam station area

General information
- Architectural style: Châteauesque
- Location: McAdam, New Brunswick, Canada
- Construction started: 1900
- Completed: 1901
- Cost: $30,000
- Client: Canadian Pacific Railway

Design and construction
- Architect: Edward Maxwell

National Historic Site of Canada
- Official name: McAdam Railway Station (Canadian Pacific) National Historic Site of Canada
- Designated: 1976

Heritage Railway Station (Canada)
- Official name: Canadian Pacific Railway Station (VIA)
- Designated: 1990
- Reference no.: 2005

New Brunswick Heritage Conservation Act
- Official name: McAdam Train Station
- Type: Provincial Historic Site
- Designated: September 12, 2003

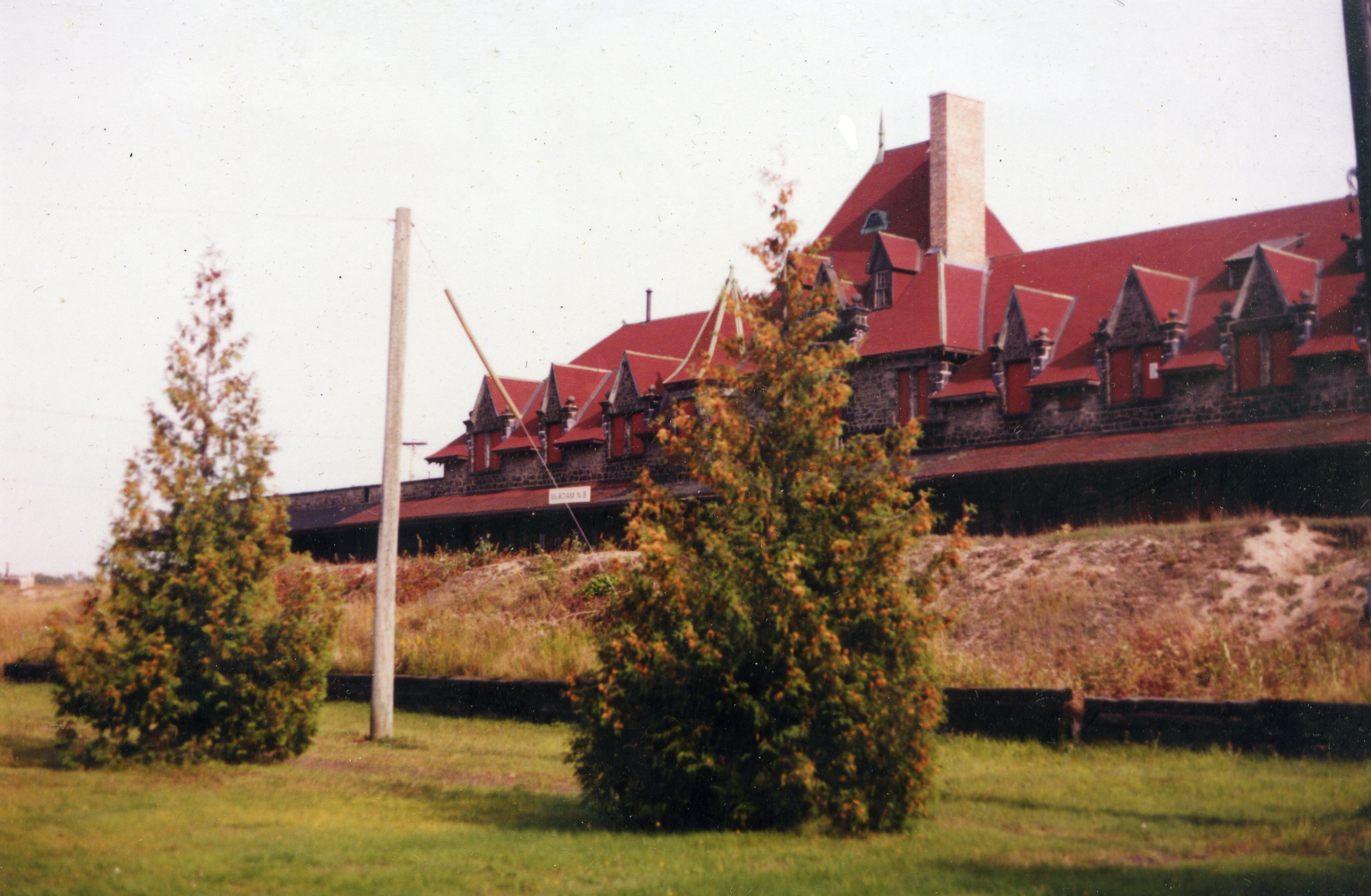
Station in 2003

McAdam station is a former railway station that dominates the village of McAdam, New Brunswick, Canada. The station is the largest passenger station in the province but since the December 17, 1994, abandonment of Via Rail's Atlantic passenger train, it no longer sees rail service and is partially used as a museum.

== Railway history ==
McAdam's railway history is traced to the 1850s–1860s when the St. Andrews and Quebec Railway was built through the area on the way toward Woodstock using a survey from the 1840s when the Canada–United States border north of the Saint Croix River was undecided and British North America stood a reasonable chance of acquiring title to the entire Saint John River watershed. The Aroostook War and the Webster–Ashburton Treaty settled the current boundary and eliminated any chance of the SA&Q building across that territory. McAdam was a small community called City Camp and comprised several lumber camps.

During the late 1860s, the European and North American Railway project's "Western Extension" was constructed from Saint John to the boundary at Saint Croix where it linked with another E&NA line from Bangor to Vanceboro.

The junction at City Camp where the E&NA crossed the SA&Q (by then part of the New Brunswick and Canada Railway) was renamed McAdam and in 1883, the New Brunswick Railway (successor to the NB&C) took over the E&NA line, making McAdam an NBR junction.

In 1889, the Canadian Pacific Railway constructed the International Railway of Maine as the final link in becoming a transcontinental railway and in 1890, the Canadian Pacific Railway leased the NBR for 999 years, making Saint John its eastern terminus.

== Station establishment and history ==
In 1900, the C.P rail began construction of the massive combined railway station/hotel in McAdam to cater to wealthy passengers changing trains to continue to the resort town of St. Andrews where they would stay at the C.P rail's hotel The Algonquin. The station was commissioned by legendary CPR President Sir William Van Horne who maintained an exclusive private estate in St. Andrews on Minister's Island. On numerous occasions during Van Horne's influential presidency at the C.P rail during the 1890s, his private car would pass by the McAdam station on the way from Montreal to his summer retreat at St. Andrews and vice versa, sometimes staying in the station hotel.

The station was built in the Chateau style and resembles a Scottish castle. It was built of local granite and located at the western end of the wye leading to St. Andrews from the Montreal-Saint John main line.

The 20-room hotel occupies the two thirds of the second floor of the station. On the ground floor, the western end of the building's ground floor is occupied by a lunch counter/canteen with a large M-shaped circular counter with swivel stools. This was where breakfast's, soup, sandwich, etc. would be served for hotel guests waiting for connecting trains and train passengers who were waiting for the Steam engines to be re-fuelled and passengers to clear Customs. It was not unusual to feed 2000 people a day at this lunch counter. The central portion of the ground floor has a more formal dining room and the kitchen area which served both eating establishments. The eastern end of the building's ground floor hosts the passenger waiting rooms and ticketing office and baggage storage rooms. The station also had a jail cell that was operated by the [Canadian Pacific Railway Police Service] and not to be used by local McAdam police.

During World War II, many troop trains departed from the station towards Halifax for deployment overseas. This is commemorated on a local mural in town.

In 1955, the C.P rail initiated an express service from Saint John to Montreal called The Atlantic Limited which was continued by Via Rail as the Atlantic with the eastern terminus shifted from Saint John to Halifax. Local connecting trains at McAdam to St. Andrews, St. Stephen, Fredericton and Woodstock were all cancelled in the early 1960s leaving McAdam with a single passenger train in each direction (The Atlantic Limited).

=== Railway Pie ===
The station was known for its "Railway pies". An early 1900s Boston News newspaper article notes that the station was famous for its pies. Customers would frequent the lunch counter which seats 65 people on stools at a W-shaped Arborite counter and would order coffee and "railway pie". One author notes that a particular type of "railway pie" was similar to a Boston cream pie. The decline of rail traffic in the 1950s led to the eventual closure of the lunch counter. The tradition of the railway pies was revived in 2010 as a fund-raising effort for the station. This continued until 2019 when the time commitment became too much for the older volunteers of the event. The station has since published a cookbook about railway pies as a continuation of the tradition. It notes that these pies were cut into five pieces, each measuring a perfect 72 degrees. Since 2023, railway pies have been served again on Sundays at the lunch counter, run by the McAdam Station Museum.

== Via Rail ==
The CPR continued to use the station until 1978 when it transferred responsibility for its passenger rail service to federal Crown corporation Via Rail, however the hotel was closed in the early 1960s and used for office space for the railway. CPR maintained ownership of the building throughout Via Rail operations in McAdam from 1978 to 1981 and 1985 to 1994.

Via Rail cancelled the Atlantic in 1981, leaving McAdam with no passenger service. This train was reinstated in 1985 but cut to tri-weekly in 1990 and cancelled completely on December 17, 1994, in light of CPR's Canadian Atlantic Railway subsidiary planning to abandon the entire railway from Saint John to Montreal.

== Heritage ==
The CPR sold its line through McAdam to the New Brunswick Southern Railway but the station has been vacant since Via Rail service was terminated in December 1994. The station was designated a protected heritage railway station by the federal government and the NBSR transferred ownership of the structure to the village of McAdam in the late 1990s. Since then, the village has undertaken fundraising and maintenance repairs to the structure and opened it during the summer months for tours.

The station is currently designated as a National Historic Site of Canada since 1976 and a Provincial Historic Site since 2003. As well, the station is a Designated Heritage Railway Station since 1990. The imposing structure is noted for "The upward thrust of its hipped gable roof and the busy rhythm of its many gabled dormers, turrets, pinnacles and pavilions, plus the smooth quality of the upper level walls, recall key elements of the style. The station is also a rare surviving example of the combined railway station/hotel, accommodating both station and hotel facilities under the same roof. As a result, the architectural presence of the McAdam CPR station is amplified much beyond that warranted by its functional requirements. "

McAdam Railway Station

1900

Constructed of local granite by the Canadian Pacific Railway, this combined station/hotel in the Chateau style symbolizes the railway's significance to this community.

— Provincial Historic Site plaque

As of 2017, the station is an active museum offering tours, catered meals, and conference facilities. The Government of New Brunswick, Parks Canada and The McAdam Historical Restoration Commission (which operates and manages the station) invested nearly $400,000 for the continued success of the facility.

== Legacy ==
On 5 May 1989 Canada Post issued 'Railway Station, McAdam' designed by Raymond Bellemare. The stamp features an image of the McAdam Railway station, which was designed by Montreal architect Edward Maxwell. The $2 stamps are perforated 13.5 and were printed by British American Bank Note Company & Canadian Bank Note Company, Limited.

Preceding station	Canadian Pacific Railway	Following station
Vanceboro toward Montreal Windsor	Montreal – McAdam	Terminus
Terminus	McAdam – Saint John	Newcomb toward Saint John
Terminus	Montreal – Saint Andrews	Barber Dam toward Saint Andrews
Cottrell toward Edmundston	Montreal – Edmundston	Terminus
