= Exo Vallée du Richelieu sector =

Public transit agency

- Parent: Exo
- Founded: 2017
- Service area: Beloeil, McMasterville, Mont-Saint-Hilaire, Otterburn Park, Saint-Basile-le-Grand, Saint-Hyacinthe
- Service type: bus service, paratransit, on-demand taxibus
- Routes: 10
- Destinations: Montreal, Longueuil, Brossard, Saint-Hyacinthe
- Hubs: Terminus Longueuil
- Annual ridership: 1,234,636 (2024)

The Exo Vallée du Richelieu sector is the division of Exo that delivers bus service to municipalities of the Richelieu Valley RCM in Quebec, Canada. These towns, located east Montreal along Quebec Route 116, receive both local service and commuter runs to Exo (public transit) stations that serve Montreal. The communities served are: Beloeil, McMasterville, Mont-Saint-Hilaire, Otterburn Park, Saint-Basile-le-Grand and Saint-Hyacinthe.

== Services ==
=== Local bus routes ===
Local routes
No.	Route	Connects to	Service times / notes
20B	Beloeil	McMasterville	Weekdays, peak only
21	Mont-Saint-Hilaire (La Pommeraie)	Mont-Saint-Hilaire	Weekdays, peak only
23	Otterburn Park	McMasterville	Weekdays, peak only
24	Saint-Basile-le-Grand (south)	Saint-Basile-le-Grand	Weekdays, peak only
25	Saint-Hyacinthe - Mont-Saint-Hilaire	Mont-Saint-Hilaire	Weekdays, peak only
26	Saint-Basile-le-Grand (north)	Saint-Basile-le-Grand	Weekdays, peak only

=== On-demand bus routes ===
On-demand bus routes
No.	Route	Connects to	Service times / notes
320	Beloeil and McMasterville	McMasterville	Weekdays, day and evening; Weekends, daytime only; Reserve between 30 minutes and 7 days in advance; Reservations via exo transport à la demande mobile app
361	Mont-Saint-Hilaire - Otterburn Park	Mont-Saint-Hilaire	Weekdays, day and evening; Weekends, daytime only; Reserve between 30 minutes and 7 days in advance; Reservations via exo transport à la demande mobile app

=== Express / regional bus routes ===
Express / regional routes
No.	Route	Connects to	Service times / notes
200	Saint-Hyacinthe - Longueuil	Longueuil–Université-de-Sherbrooke; Saint-Basile-le-Grand; McMasterville	
201	ExpressO Mont-Saint-Hilaire - Longueuil	Longueuil–Université-de-Sherbrooke; Saint-Basile-le-Grand; McMasterville	Weekdays, peak only
300	Saint-Hyacinthe - Terminus Brossard	Brossard; Mont-Saint-Hilaire; Saint-Basile-le-Grand; McMasterville	Weekdays only
520	Express Beloeil / Radisson	Radisson; Terminus Sainte-Julie; Beloeil Park and Ride	Weekdays only

== See also ==
- Exo (public transit) bus services
