= Saint-Hyacinthe =

- City
- Ville de Saint-Hyacinthe
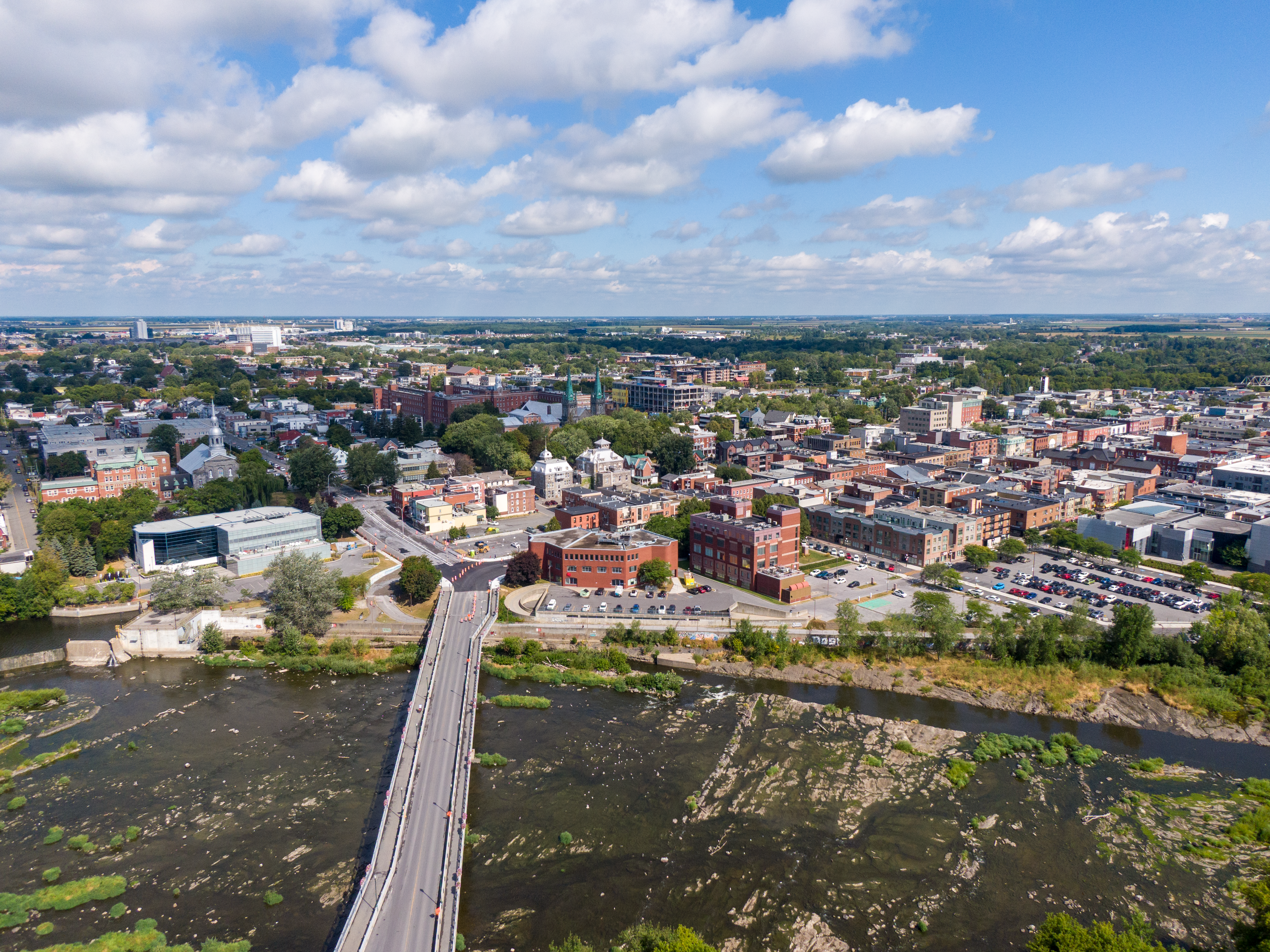
- Saint-Hyacinthe in 2025

- Seal

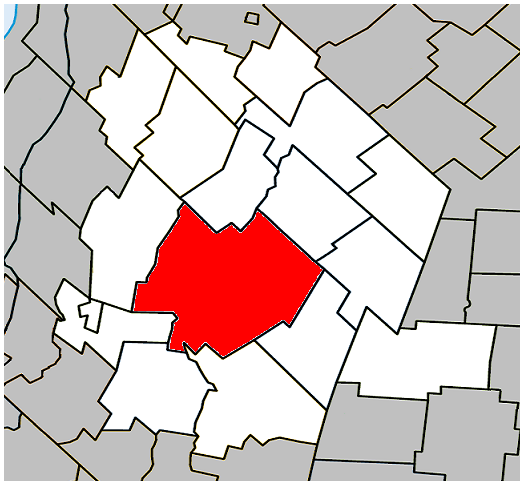
- Location within Les Maskoutains RCM

- Location in southern Quebec
- Coordinates: 45°37′50.983″N 72°57′14.522″W
- Country: Canada
- Province: Quebec
- Region: Montérégie
- RCM: Les Maskoutains
- Founded: 1849
- Constituted: 27 December 2001

Government
  - Mayor: André Beauregard
  - Federal riding: Saint-Hyacinthe—Bagot—Acton
  - Prov. riding: Saint-Hyacinthe

Area
  - City: 191.60 km^{2} (73.98 sq mi)
  - Land: 188.97 km^{2} (72.96 sq mi)
  - Urban: 30.8 km^{2} (11.9 sq mi)
  - Metro: 328.53 km^{2} (126.85 sq mi)

Population (2016)
  - City: 59,614
  - Density: 294.5/km^{2} (763/sq mi)
  - Urban: 50,616
  - Urban density: 1,643.4/km^{2} (4,256/sq mi)
  - Metro: 56,794
  - Metro density: 181.5/km^{2} (470/sq mi)
  - Pop 2011-2016: ▲4.5%
  - Dwellings: 25,483
- Time zone: UTC−05:00 (EST)
  - Summer (DST): UTC−04:00 (EDT)
- Postal code(s): J2R-J2T
- Area codes: 450 and 579
- Highways A-20 (TCH): R-116; R-137; R-224; R-231; R-235
- Website: Official website

Saint-Hyacinthe (/ ... ˈhaɪ.əsɪnθ/ ... HY-ə-sinth, French: [sɛ̃t‿ijasɛ̃t]) is a city in southwestern Quebec east of Montreal on the Yamaska River. The population as of the 2021 Canadian census was 57,239. The city is located in Les Maskoutains Regional County Municipality of the Montérégie region and is crossed by the Yamaska River, which is perpendicular to Quebec Autoroute 20. Saint-Hyacinthe is the seat of the judicial district of the same name.

== History ==
Jacques-Hyacinthe Simon dit Delorme, owner of the seigneurie, started its settlement in 1757. He gave his patron saint name (Saint Hyacinth the Confessor of Poland) to the seigneurie, which was made a city in 1850.

St. Hyacinth's Cathedral is the seat of the Roman Catholic Diocese of Saint-Hyacinthe. It was erected in 1852. Bishop Louis-Zéphirin Moreau, beatified by Pope John Paul II on May 10, 1987, was bishop of the diocese from 1875 until his death in 1901.

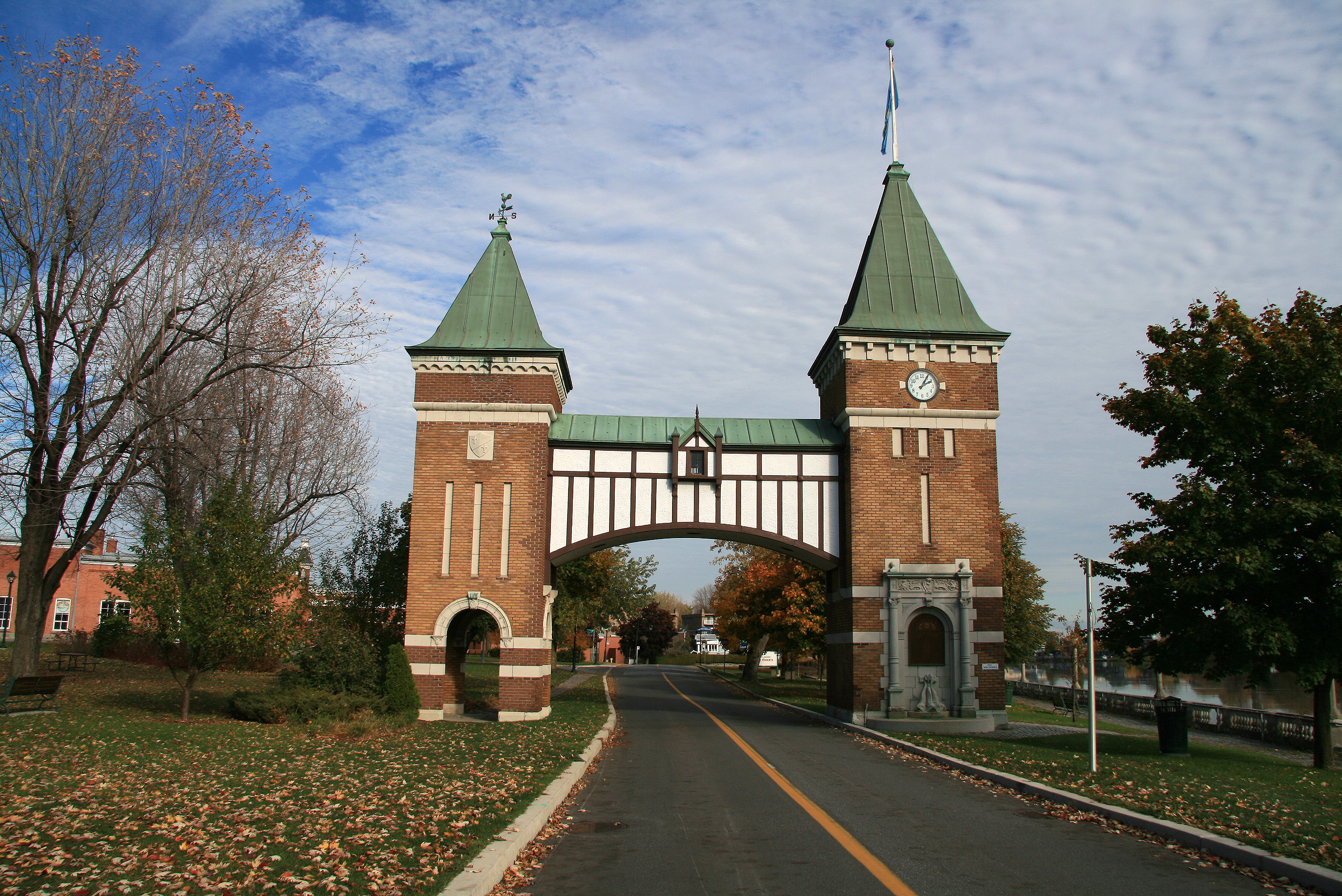
Former Mayors' Gateway

=== 2001 merger ===
As part of the 2000–06 municipal reorganization in Quebec, on 27 December 2001, the city of Saint-Hyacinthe amalgamated with five neighbouring towns (listed here with their populations as of 2001):

- Saint-Hyacinthe (39,739)
- Sainte-Rosalie (4,170)
- Saint-Thomas-d'Aquin (4,000)
- Sainte-Rosalie Parish (1,476)
- Saint-Hyacinthe-le-Confesseur, Quebec (1,151)
- Notre-Dame-de-Saint-Hyacinthe, Quebec (858)

== Demographics ==
Historical Census Data - Saint-Hyacinthe, Quebec
Year	Pop.	±%
1991	39,292	—
1996	38,981	−0.8%
1996A	38,995	+0.0%
2001	38,739	−0.7%
2001M	50,394	+30.1%
2006	51,616	+2.4%
2011	53,236	+3.1%
2016	55,648	+4.5%
(A) adjustment due to boundary change. (M) merger with Sainte-Rosalie, Saint-Thomas-d'Aquin, Sainte-Rosalie Parish, Saint-Hyacinthe-le-Confesseur and Notre-Dame-de-Saint-Hyacinthe on 27 December 2001.

In the 2021 Canadian census conducted by Statistics Canada, Saint-Hyacinthe had a population of 57,239 living in 26,870 of its 28,096 total private dwellings, a change of 2.9% from its 2016 population of 55,648. With a land area of 188.85 km^{2} (72.92 sq mi), it had a population density of 303.1/km^{2} (785.0/sq mi) in 2021.

Canada census – Saint-Hyacinthe community profile

	2021	2016	2011
Population	57,239 (+2.9% from 2016)	55,648 (+4.5% from 2011)	53,236 (+3.1% from 2006)
Land area	188.85 km^{2} (72.92 sq mi)	188.97 km^{2} (72.96 sq mi)	188.69 km^{2} (72.85 sq mi)
Population density	303.1/km^{2} (785/sq mi)	294.5/km^{2} (763/sq mi)	282.1/km^{2} (731/sq mi)
Median age	46.4 (M: 44.4, F: 49.2)	47.0 (M: 44.0, F: 49.6)	46.1 (M: 43.4, F: 48.1)
Private dwellings	26,870 (total)	24,458 (total)	25,774 (total)
Median household income			$45,621

References: 2021 2016 2011

=== Ethnicity ===
In 2021, 9.8% of Saint-Hyacinthe residents were visible minorities, 1.3% were Indigenous, and the remaining 88.9% were white/European. The largest visible minority groups were Black (4.4%), Latin American (3.1%) and Arab (1.4%).

Panethnic groups in the City of Saint-Hyacinthe (2001−2021)
Panethnic group	2021		2016		2011		2006		2001	
Panethnic group	Pop.	%	Pop.	%	Pop.	%	Pop.	%	Pop.	%
European (Note: Statistic includes all persons that did not make up part of a visible minority or an indigenous identity.)	48,755	88.91%	48,900	93.15%	48,845	95.78%	48,530	97.14%	36,535	98.68%
African	2,405	4.39%	1,170	2.23%	295	0.58%	375	0.75%	190	0.51%
Latin American	1,680	3.06%	1,005	1.91%	860	1.69%	385	0.77%	75	0.2%
Middle Eastern (Note: Statistic includes total responses of "West Asian" and "Arab" under visible minority section on census.)	825	1.5%	560	1.07%	325	0.64%	115	0.23%	55	0.15%
Indigenous	710	1.29%	490	0.93%	390	0.76%	280	0.56%	65	0.18%
East Asian (Note: Statistic includes total responses of "Chinese", "Korean", and "Japanese" under visible minority section on census.)	150	0.27%	150	0.29%	110	0.22%	115	0.23%	45	0.12%
Southeast Asian (Note: Statistic includes total responses of "Filipino" and "Southeast Asian" under visible minority section on census.)	140	0.26%	80	0.15%	75	0.15%	130	0.26%	30	0.08%
South Asian	65	0.12%	65	0.12%	20	0.04%	30	0.06%	25	0.07%
Other/multiracial (Note: Statistic includes total responses of "Visible minority, n.i.e." and "Multiple visible minorities" under visible minority section on census.)	110	0.2%	95	0.18%	80	0.16%	0	0%	0	0%
Total responses	54,835	95.8%	52,495	94.33%	50,995	95.79%	49,960	96.79%	37,025	95.58%
Total population	57,239	100%	55,648	100%	53,236	100%	51,616	100%	38,739	100%
Note: Totals greater than 100% due to multiple origin responses

=== Religion ===
71.8% of residents were Christian, down from 88.8% in 2011. 63.2% were Catholic, 5.6% were Christian n.o.s, 1.6% were Protestant, and 1.3% were other Christian denominations or Christian-related traditions. Non-religious or secular people were 25.0% of the population, up from 9.9% in 2011. The only named non-Christian religions with adherents in Saint-Hyacinthe were Islam (2.6%) and Buddhism (0.2%). Other religions and spiritual traditions accounted for just 0.3% of the population.

=== Language ===
In 2021, French was the mother tongue of 90.9% of residents. Other common first languages were Spanish (3.1%), Arabic (0.9%) and English (0.9%). 0.7% listed both French and a non-official language as mother tongues, while 0.6% listed both French and English.

Canada Census Mother Tongue - Saint-Hyacinthe, Quebec
Census	Total	French			English			French & English			Other		
Year	Responses	Count	Trend	Pop %	Count	Trend	Pop %	Count	Trend	Pop %	Count	Trend	Pop %
2016	54,045	51,080	▲3.8%	94.51%	450	▲5.9%	0.83%	225	▲7.1%	0.42%	2,520	▲38.1%	4.66%
2011	51,695	49,235	▲2.2%	95.24%	425	▲46.6%	0.82%	210	▲68.0%	0.41%	1,825	▲38.7%	3.53%
2006	49,955	48,165	▲33.5%	96.42%	290	▲7.4%	0.58%	125	▲31.6%	0.25%	1,375	▲139.1%	2.75%
2001	37,025	36,085	▼1.8%	97.46%	270	▼27.0%	0.73%	95	▼17.4%	0.26%	575	▲26.4%	1.55%
1996	37,670	36,730	n/a	97.50%	370	n/a	0.98%	115	n/a	0.31%	455	n/a	1.21%

== Economy ==
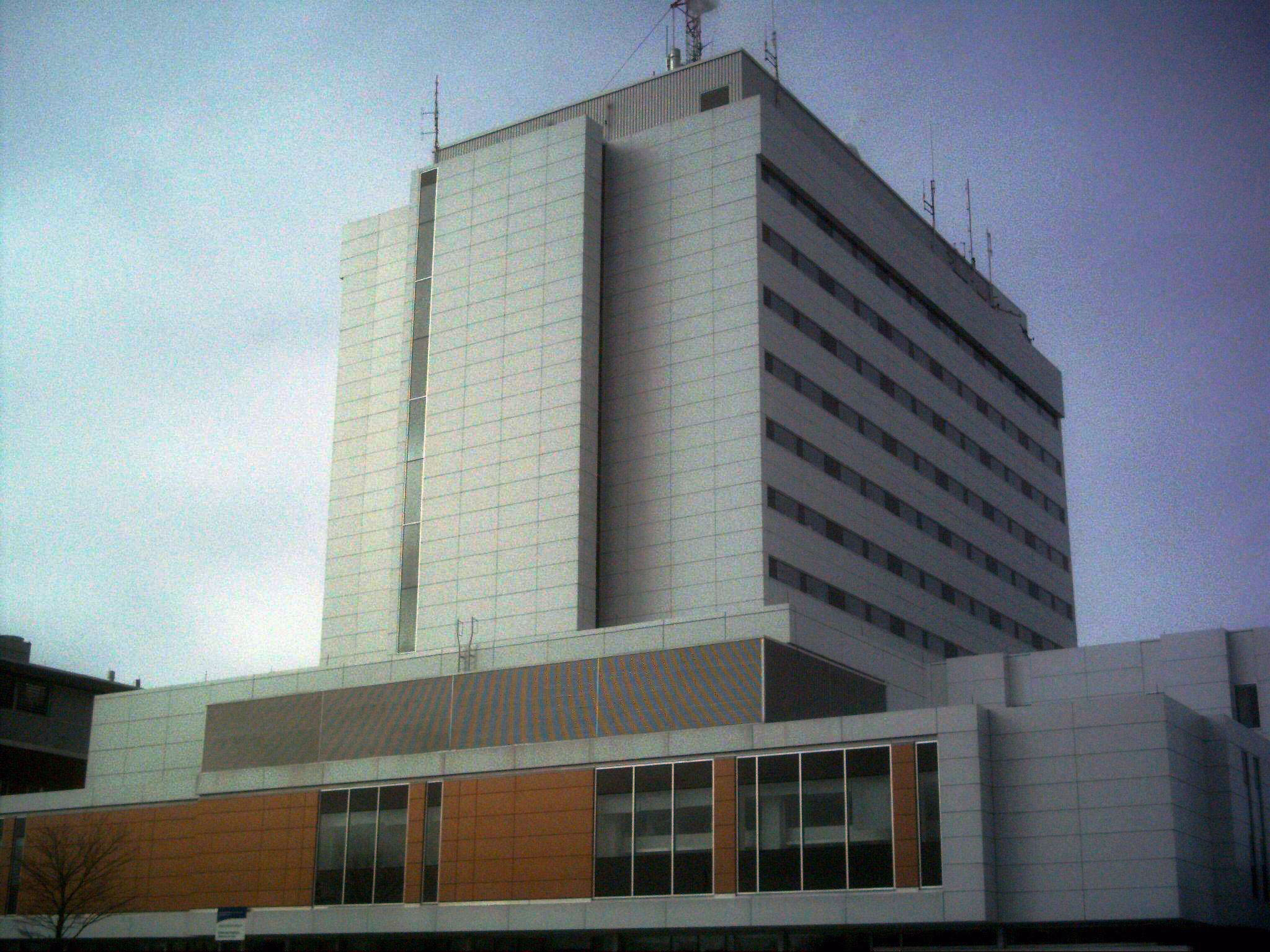
Hôpital Honoré-Mercier

Agriculture and its related derivates are at the heart of Saint-Hyacinthe's economic infrastructure. The city has been nicknamed the "Agricultural technopolis of Canada", because it is home to several research institutions in the field such as the centre de recherche sur les aliments, the Institut de recherche et développement en agro-environnement, the Institut de technologie agroalimentaire and the head office of the Artificial Insemination Centre of Quebec.

Saint-Hyacinthe hosts numerous agriculture related events such as fairs, exposition and congresses and acts a hub in the field. The Agricultural Hall of Fame of Quebec decided to move there from Quebec City to give itself more visibility in the community.

In addition, it is also home to Orgues Létourneau and Casavant Frères, builders of pipe organs, and Intact Financial, formerly known as ING Canada.

=== Transport ===
- Local bus service operated by Transport Scolaire Sogesco
- Paratransit service by MRC Les Maskoutains
- Train bus service to Mont-Saint-Hilaire station, connecting by Exo commuter rail on the Mont-Saint-Hilaire line to Central Station in Downtown Montreal
- Interurban bus service by Exo de la Vallée du Richelieu sector
- Via Rail has several trains that stop at the Saint-Hyacinthe station
- The private Saint-Hyacinthe Aerodrome is located 3 nautical miles (5.6 km; 3.5 mi) west of the city.

== Arts and culture ==
The Centre d'exposition Expression is a museum in Saint-Hyacinthe whose mission is to promote and disseminate contemporary and current art. The centre presents exhibitions renowned for their artistic quality. These exhibitions are complemented by an education and mediation service, publications and collections.

== Education ==
The South Shore Protestant Regional School Board previously served the municipality.

In association with the Université de Montréal, Saint-Hyacinthe is home to the only veterinary medicine faculty of Quebec and the only such school in North America where teaching is provided in French.

== Sports ==
From 1989 to 1996, the city had a team in the Quebec Major Junior Hockey League known as the Saint-Hyacinthe Laser. From 2001 to 2009, the city was represented in the Ligue Nord-Américaine de Hockey (known as the Quebec Semi-Pro Hockey League (QSPHL) until 2004) by the Saint-Hyacinthe Cousin (2001–05), Saint-Hyacinthe Cristal (2005–06), Saint-Hyacinthe Top Design (2006–08) and Saint-Hyacinthe Chiefs (2008–09). The city's main hockey arena is the historic Stade L.P. Gaucher, which was built in 1937.

== Notable people ==
The following individuals were born or grew up in the region of Saint-Hyacinthe:

- Paul Arcand (born 1960), host and journalist
- François Avard (born 1968), author and screenwriter known for the television series Les Bougon
- Télesphore-Damien Bouchard (1881–1962), Quebec politician
- Robert Bédard (born 1931), professional tennis player, President of Tennis Québec, Vice-President of Tennis Canada, teacher (Bishop's College School), teacher and headmaster (St. Andrew's College, Aurora)
- Michel-Esdras Bernier (1841–1921), Former Minister of Inland Revenue
- Colonel (Ret.) Jean Berthiaume (1915–2003), OBE, CD, infantry officer of the Régiment de St-Hyacinthe and of the Royal 22^{e} Régiment - 1915-2003
- Martin Brodeur (born 1972), National Hockey League (NHL) hockey player, goalie for the New Jersey Devils
- Geneviève Brouillette (born 1969), actress
- Jean-Paul Cabana (born 1934), racing driver
- Anthony Chabot (1813-1888), businessman and entrepreneur known for his development of water systems and hydraulic mines, especially in Northern California.
- Gérard Côté (1913–1993), marathon runner
- Denis DeJordy (born 1938), National Hockey League (NHL) hockey player
- Sébastien Demers (born 1979), boxer
- Henriette Dessaulles (1860–1946), journalist (aka Fadette)
- Gérald Fauteux (1900–1980), former Chief Justice of the Supreme Court of Canada
- Willie Lamothe (1920–1992), singer and actor
- Sir François Langelier (1838–1915), politician
- Ricardo Larrivée (born 1967), cooking show host
- Pierre Lassonde (born 1947), businessperson and philanthropist
- Yvan Loubier (born 1959), politician
- Victor Morin (1865–1960), notary, politician, and writer
- David Savard (born 1990), NHL player for the Montreal Canadiens
- Hyacinthe-Marie Simon, dit Delorme, (1777–1814) son of Jacques-Hyacinthe Simon dit Delorme, the original owner of the seigneurie
- Mario Pouliot (born 1963), former head hockey coach for Saint-Hyacinthe Laser LHJMQ

== Gallery ==
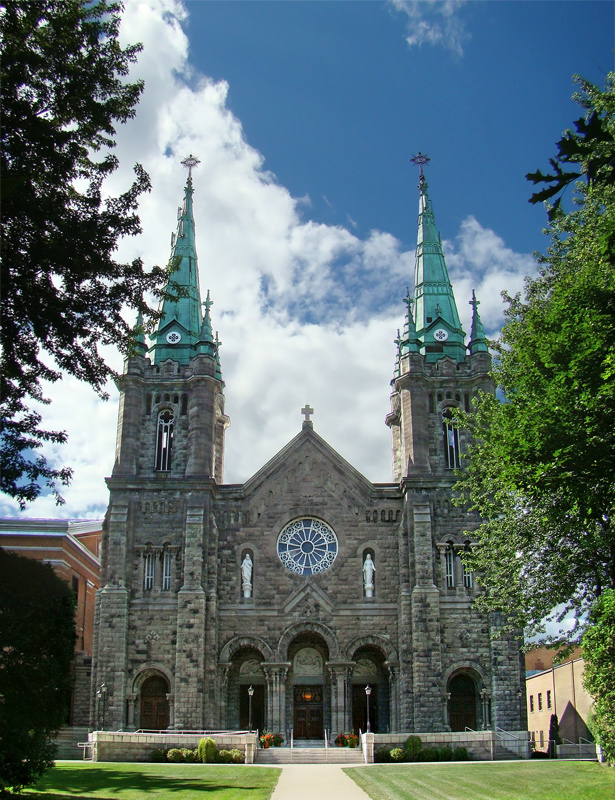
St. Hyacinth's Cathedral

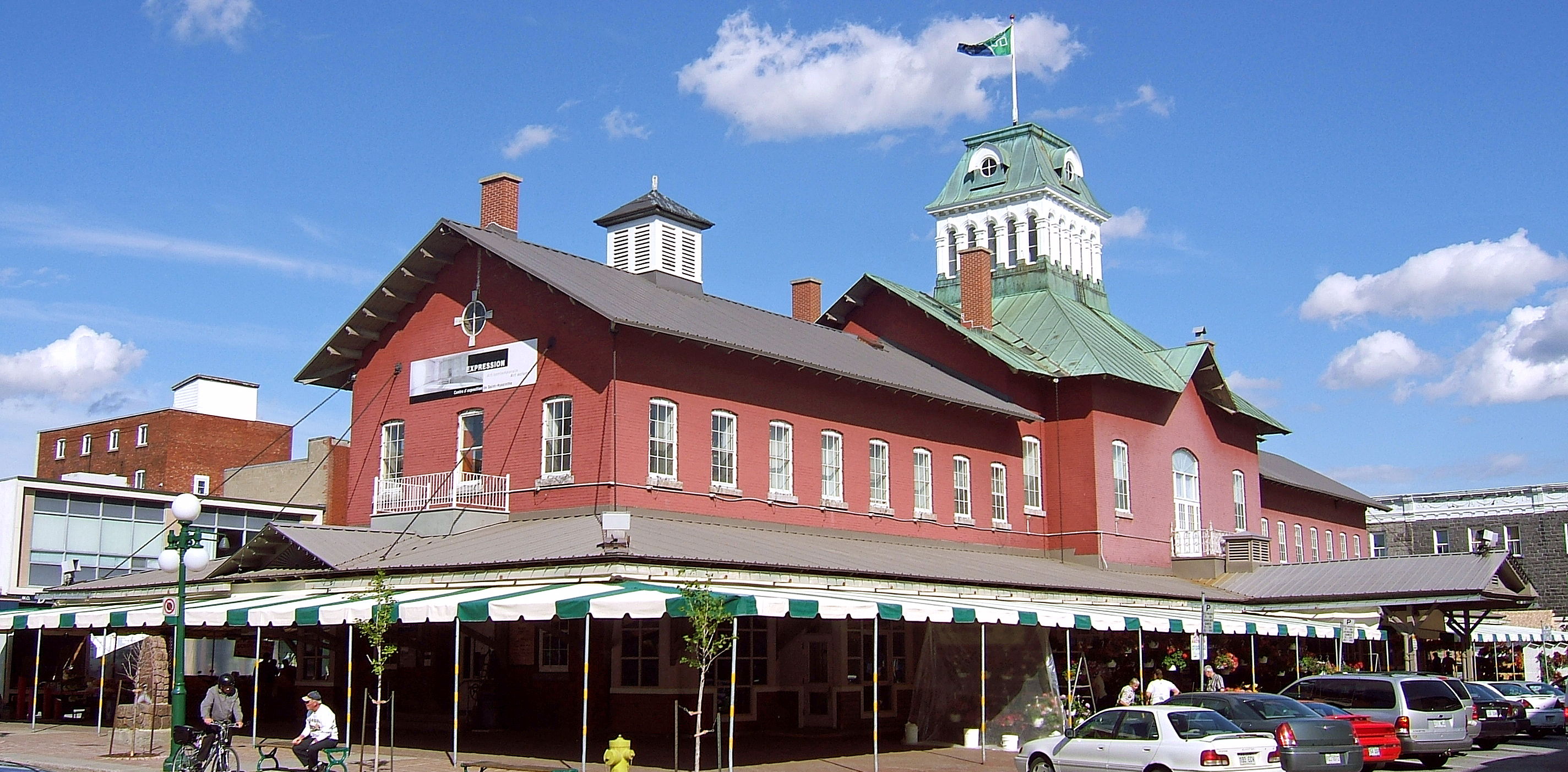
St. Hyacinthe's public market

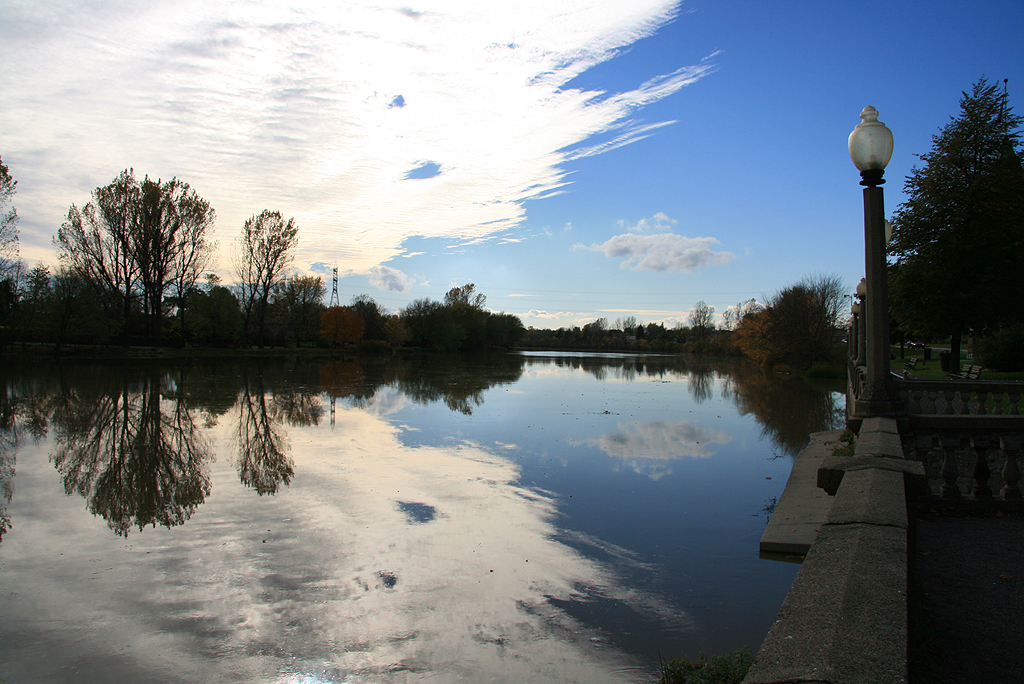
The Yamaska River

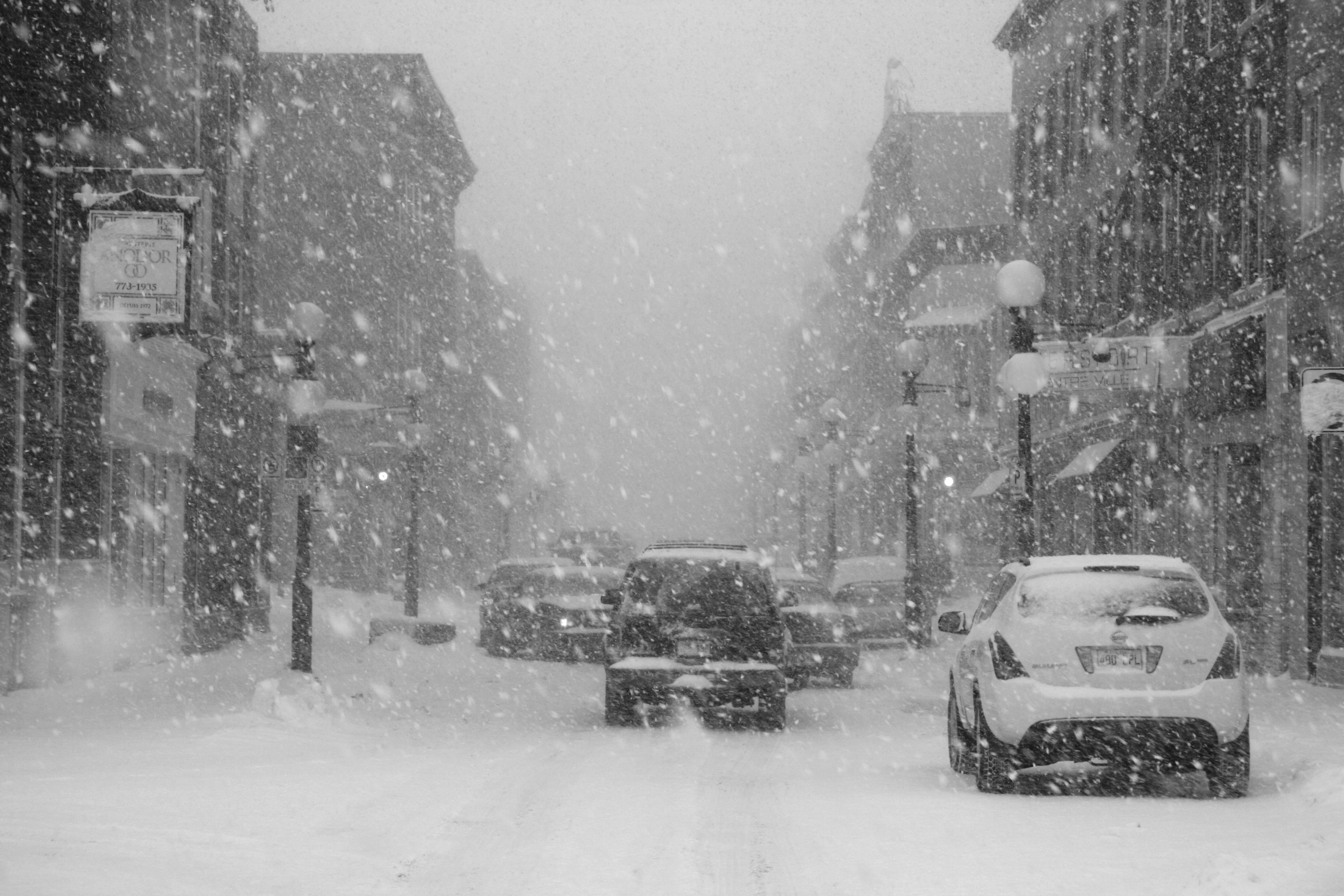
Downtown Saint-Hyacinthe during a blizzard

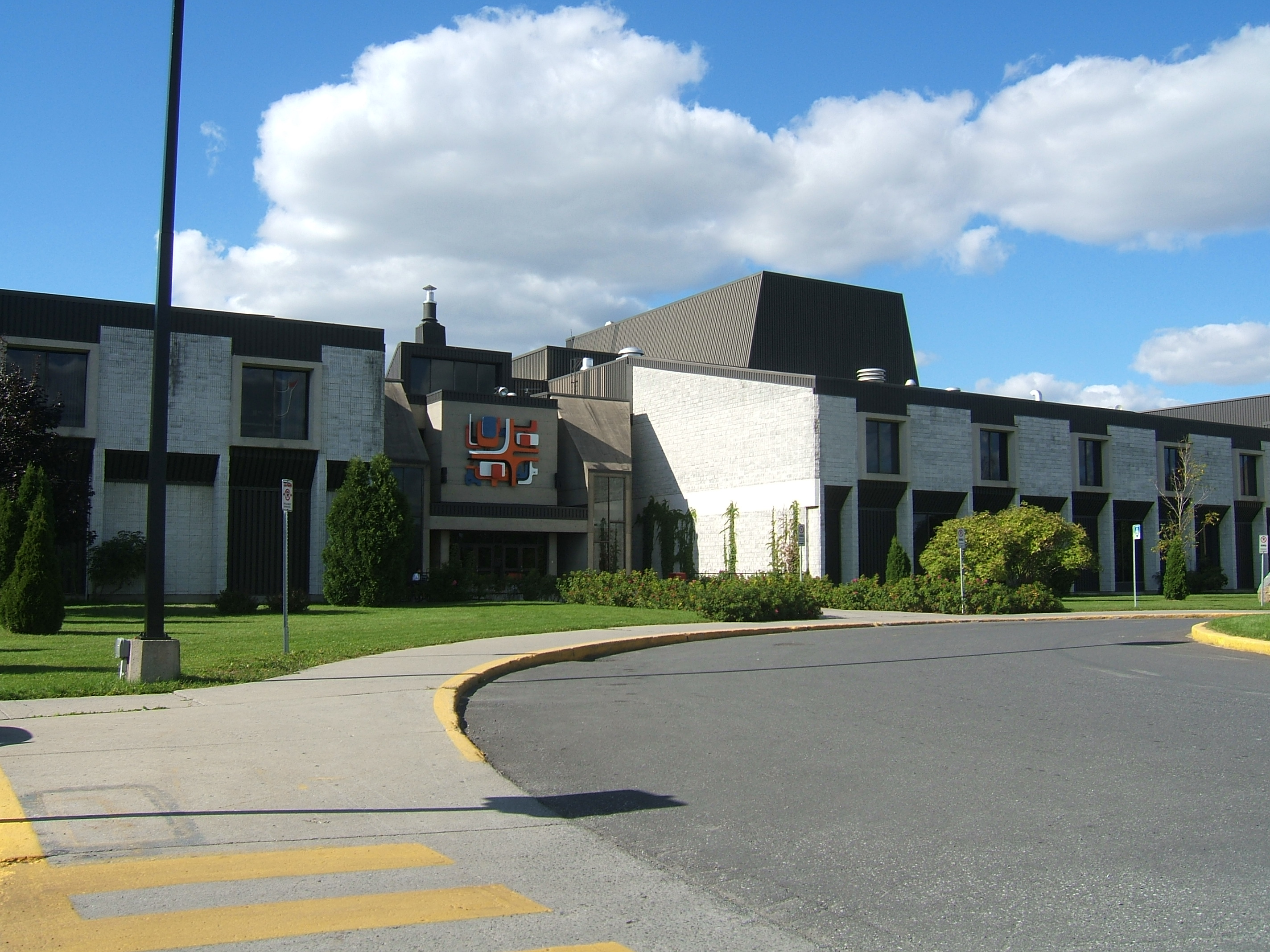
Cégep de Saint-Hyacinthe

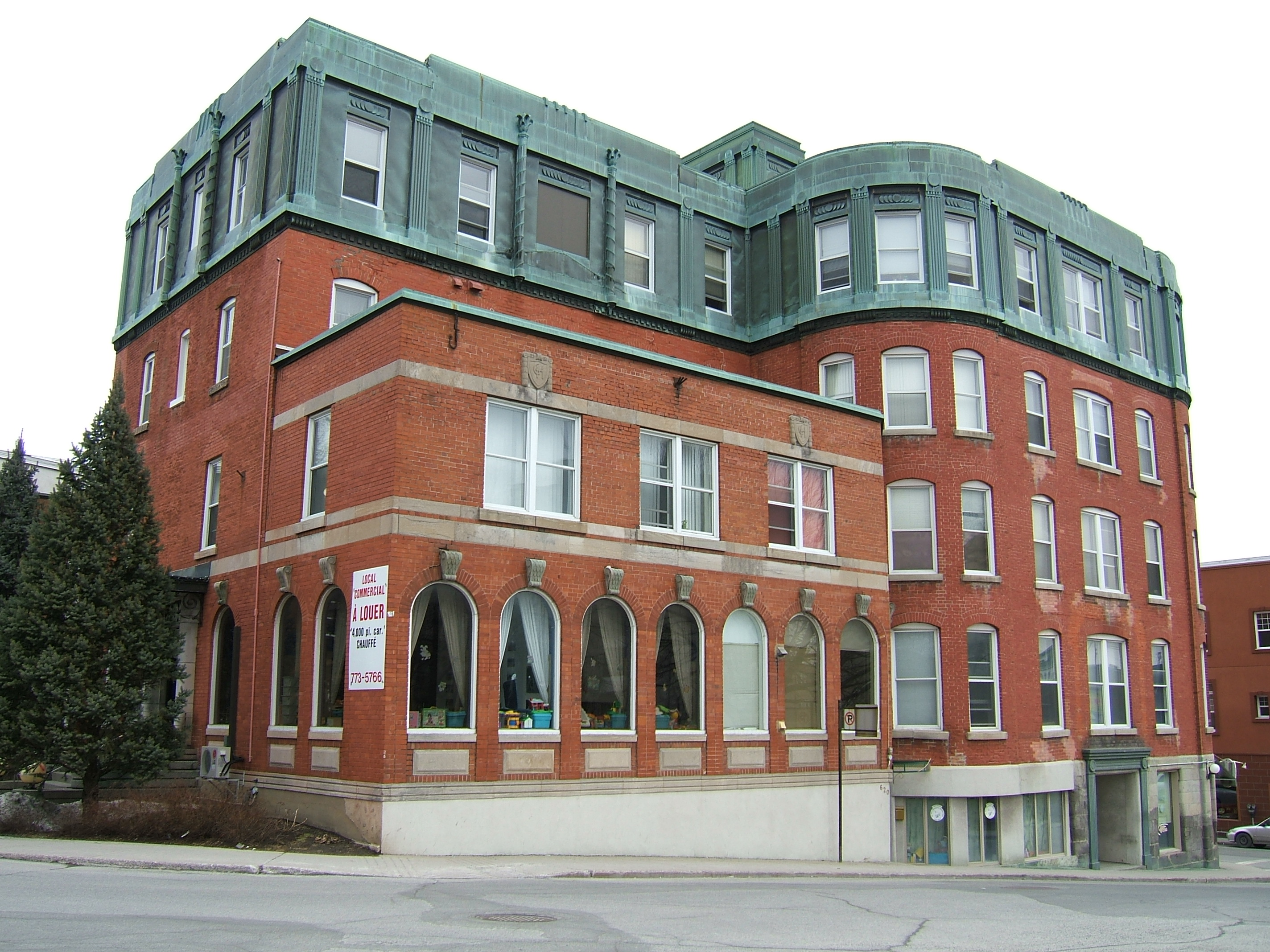
Château Maska

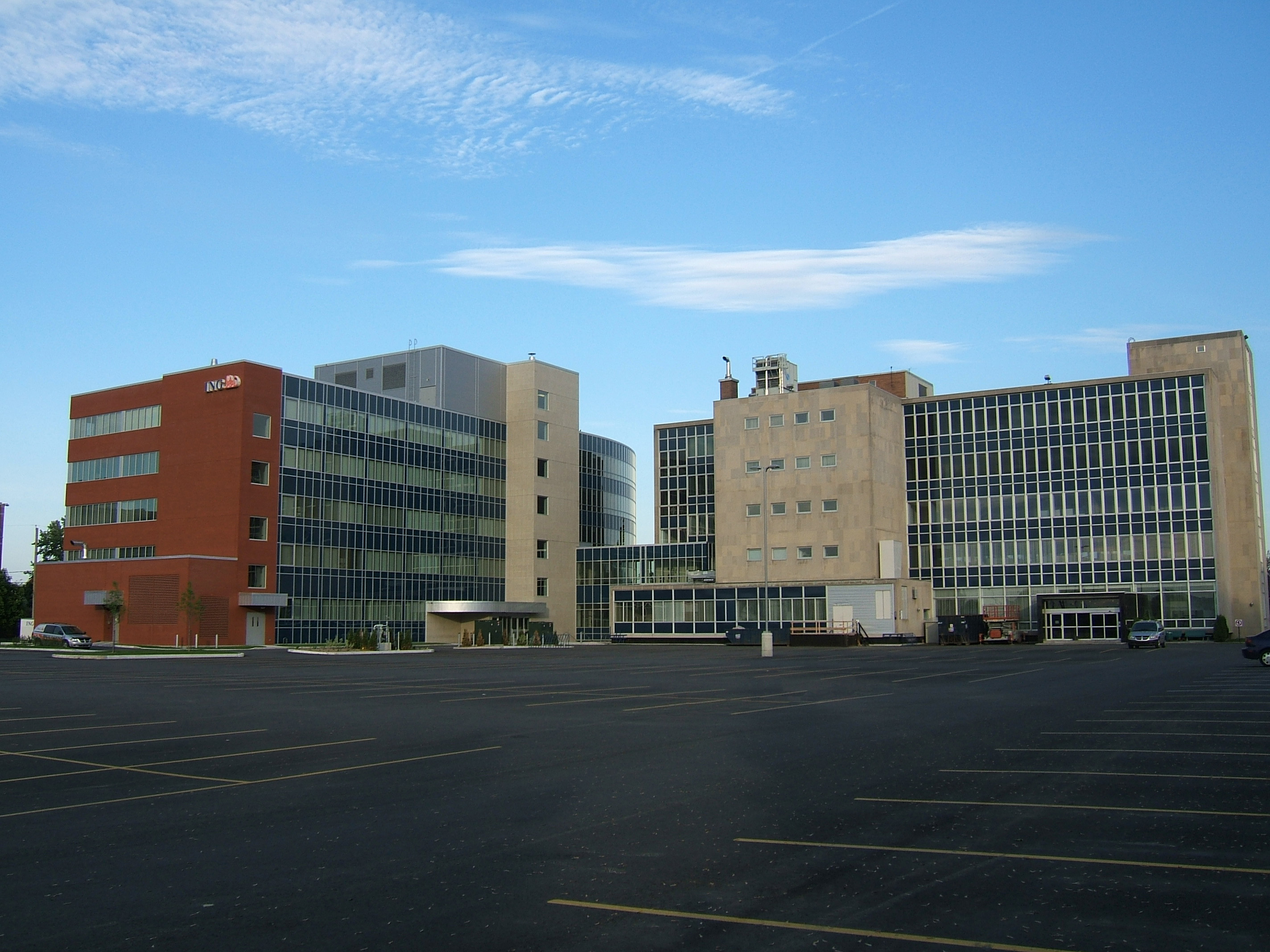
Intact Financial building

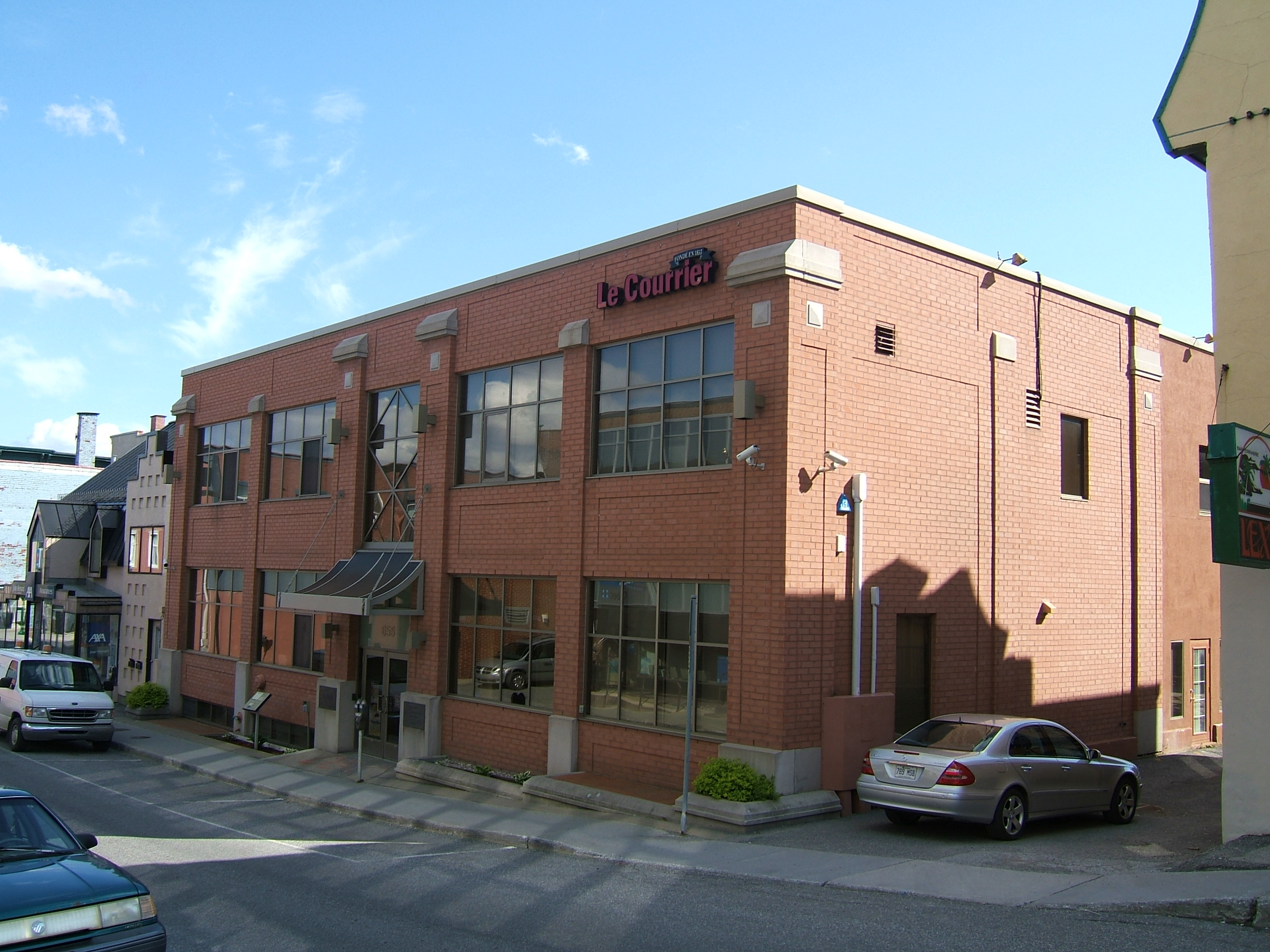
Le Courrier building

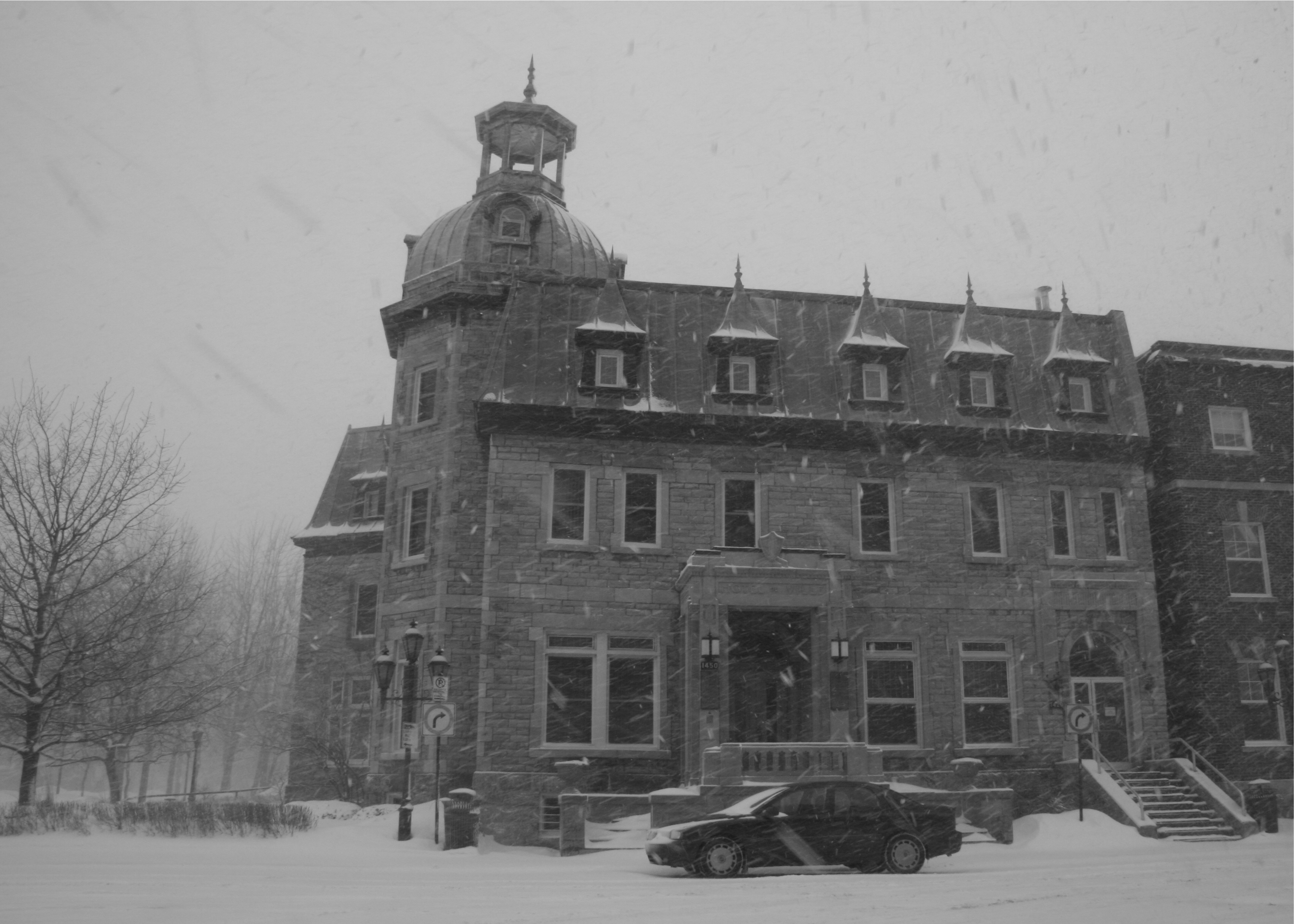
City Hall in winter 2008

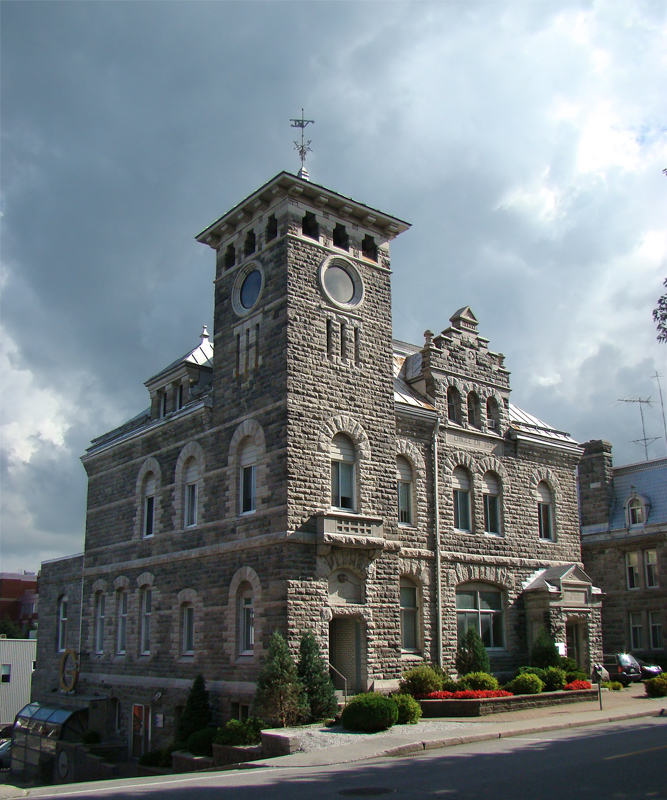
Former Post Office (1892), National Historic Site of Canada

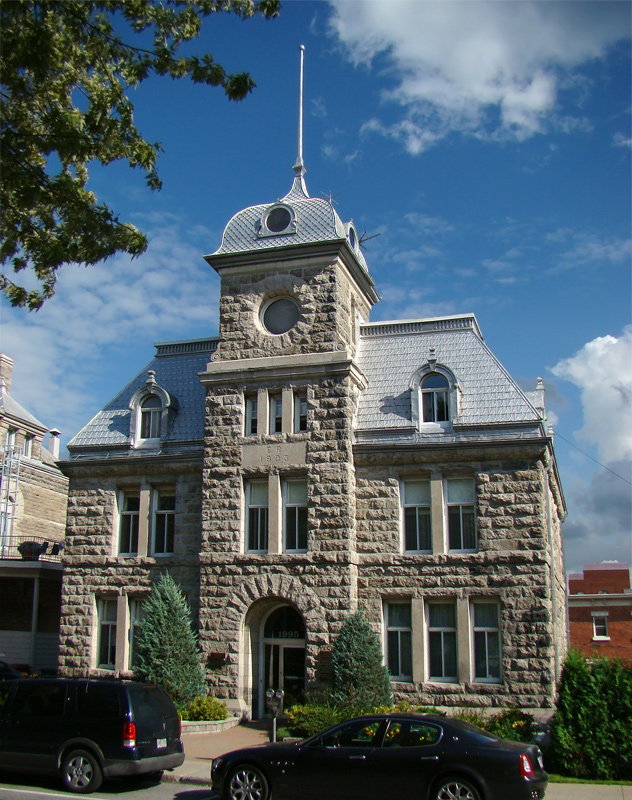
Former Customs House (1903)

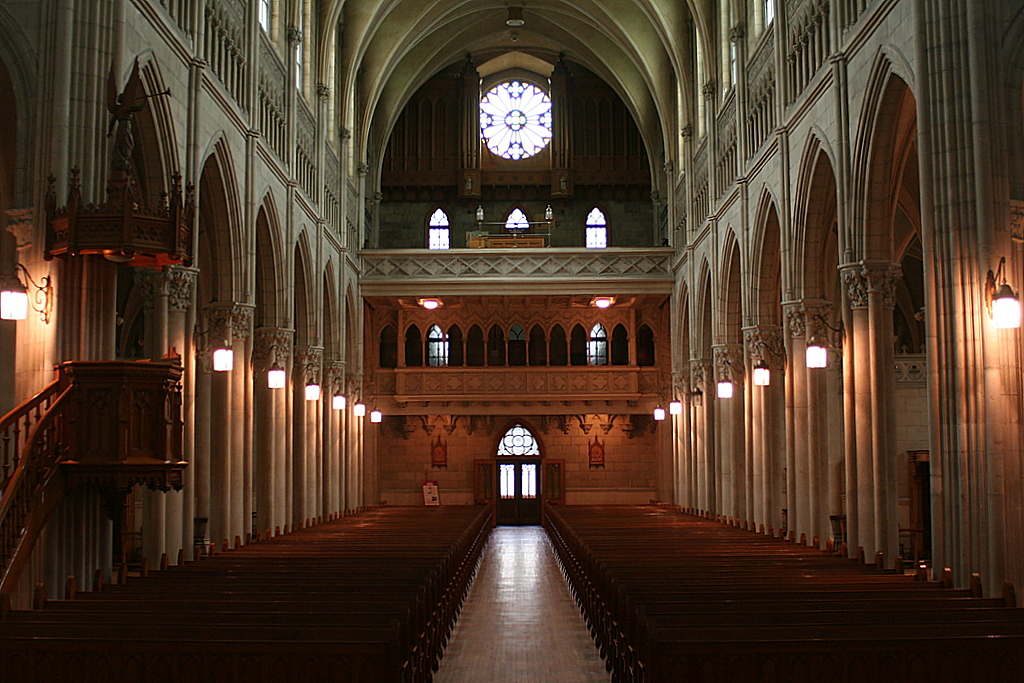
Interior of the Chapel of the Seminaire

== See also ==
- Alexander "Buck" Choquette
- Jewish colonies in Canada
- List of towns in Quebec
