= Longueuil–Saint-Hubert station =

Railway station in Quebec, Canada

Longueuil–Saint-Hubert
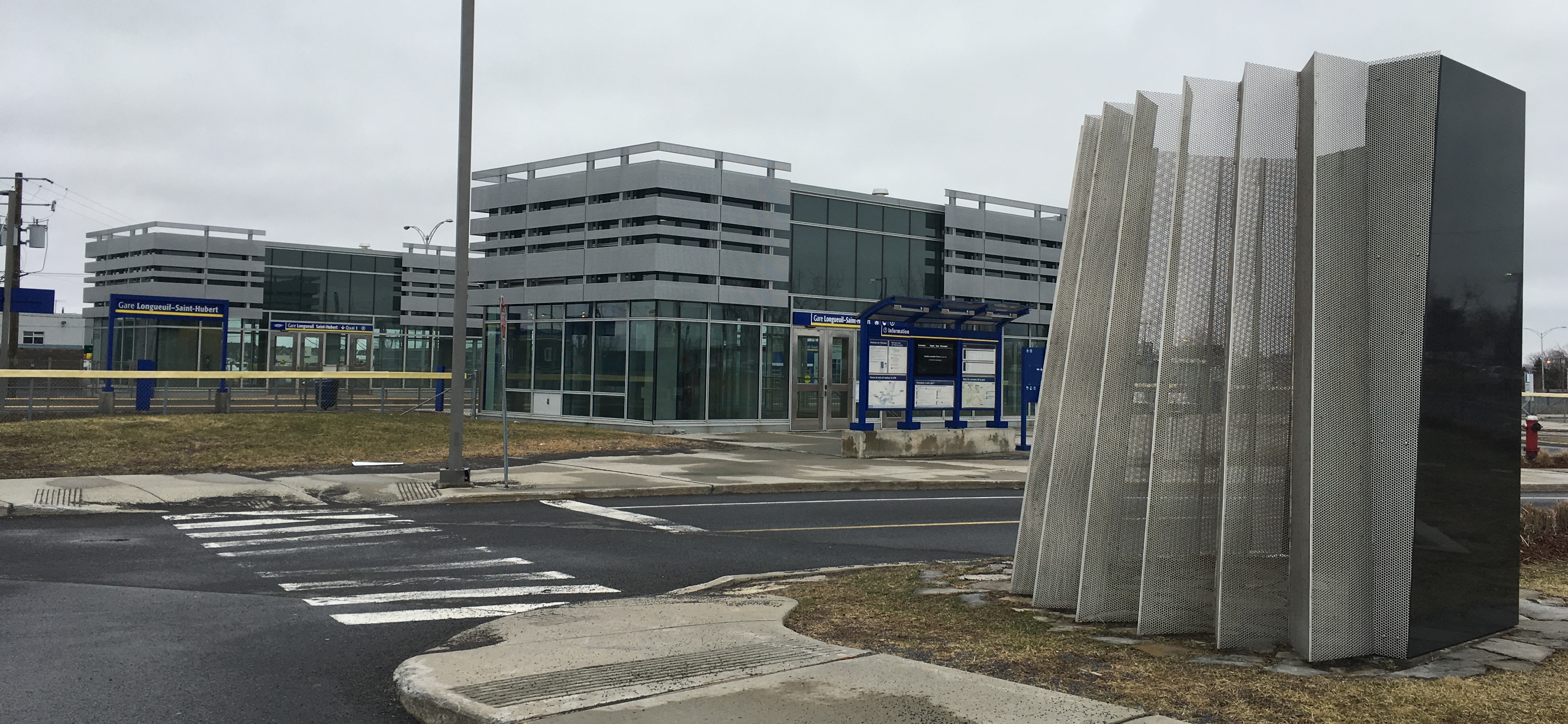

General information
- Location: 2505 Patrick Street; Saint-Hubert, Quebec J3Y 3M9
- Coordinates: 45°30′29″N 73°26′07″W
- Operator: Exo
- Platforms: 2 side platforms
- Tracks: 2
- Connections: Réseau de transport de Longueuil

Construction
- Parking: 600 spaces
- Cycle facilities: 30 spaces

Other information
- Fare zone: ARTM: B
- Website: Longueuil–Saint-Hubert station (exo.quebec)

History
- Opened: December 1, 2003
- Rebuilt: August 2013

Passengers
- 2019: 348,800

Services
Preceding station	Exo	Following station
Saint-Lambert toward Montreal	Line 13 – Mont-Saint-Hilaire	Saint-Bruno toward Mont-Saint-Hilaire
Former services at St. Hubert (CN)
Preceding station	Canadian National Railway	Following station
Services in 1948
St. Lambert toward Montreal	Montreal – Moncton	Beloeil toward Moncton
St. Lambert toward Montreal	Montreal – Portland	St. Bruno toward Portland
Location

Longueuil–Saint-Hubert station (French pronunciation: [lɔ̃ɡœj sɛ̃t‿ybɛʁ]) is a commuter rail station operated by Exo in the Saint-Hubert borough of Longueuil, Quebec, Canada.

It is served by the Mont-Saint-Hilaire line.

== History ==
The current, permanent station and facilities opened on August 26, 2013, replacing a temporary train station named Saint-Hubert that had been set up several hundred meters to the east since December 2003. The new installations include longer, permanent platforms that allow access to all cars of the train, new shelters and a tunnel allowing access to both platforms.

The new station is equipped with a work of public art, a sculpture by Marie-France Brière titled Zigzag. It stands opposite the station building.

== Connecting bus routes ==
Réseau de transport de Longueuil
No.	Route	Connects to	Service times / notes
8 ♿︎	Chemin de Chambly / Cousineau / Promenades Saint-Bruno	Longueuil–Université-de-Sherbrooke	Daily
22		De Mortagne park and ride	Weekdays, peak only
88 ♿︎	Chemin de Chambly / Mountainview	Longueuil–Université-de-Sherbrooke	Daily
128	Zone aéroportuaire / Parc industriel St-Bruno	Longueuil–Université-de-Sherbrooke	Weekdays, peak only
428	Zone aéroportuaire / Aéroport MET	Longueuil–Université-de-Sherbrooke	Daily Connects to Montreal Metropolitan Airport
442	Cousineau / Pacific	Longueuil–Université-de-Sherbrooke	Weekdays, peak only
