= San Bruno station =

San Bruno Station may refer to the following stations in San Bruno, California, US:

- San Bruno station (BART)
- San Bruno station (Caltrain)

== See also ==
- Saint-Bruno station
