= Transport Scolaire Sogesco =

Private transportation company in Quebec, Canada

- Headquarters: 1125 Boul Saint-Joseph
- Locale: Drummondville, QC
- Service area: Quebec and Eastern Ontario
- Service type: school bus, paratransit
- Website: sogesco.ca

Sogesco is the largest private transportation company in Quebec, Canada.

Transport Scolaire Sogesco Inc., founded in 1989, specializes in school transportation, but also provides paratransit and urban transit services. It employs more than 1000 people and has 24 subsidiaries, each of which operates in the territory of one or more school boards in Quebec and Ontario.

== Subsidiaries ==
- Autobus ABC, Bedford
- Autobus Acton, Saint-Théodore-d'Acton
- Autobus des Cantons, Fleurimont
- Autobus de l'Énergie, Saint-Georges-de-Champlain
- Autobus des Érables, Saint-Georges
- Autobus du Fer, Sept-Îles
- Autobus du Village, Gatineau
- Autobus Granby, Granby
- Autobus la Diligence, Sainte-Adèle
- Autobus la Montréalaise, Laval
- Autobus Lasalle, Shawville
- Autobus Longueuil, Longueuil
- Autobus Manic, Baie-Comeau
- Autobus Québec Métro 2000, Québec
- Autobus R. Pouliot, Fleurimont
- Autobus Rive Sud, Longueuil
- Autobus Venise, Salaberry-de-Valleyfield
- Autobus Voltigeurs, Drummondville
- Autobus Yamaska (131354 Canada), Farnham
- Baie Transport, Gatineau
- Bigras Transport, Gatineau
- Camille Mailloux R.D.L., Rivière-du-Loup
- Compagnie de Transport Maskoutaine, Saint-Hyacinthe
- Entreprises P. Dorais, Dunham
- Eugène Dolbec & Fils, Saint-Jean-sur-Richelieu
- Renfrew County Bus Lines (2006), Renfrew, ON
- Valley Bus Lines, Kemptville, ON
- PMD Brault, Beauharnois, Québec
- Autobus Lemay, Drummondville, Québec
- Multi-Transport, Drummondville, Québec
- Autobus Gaston & Sylvio Hébert, Wickham, Québec
