= Saint-Basile-le-Grand =

- City

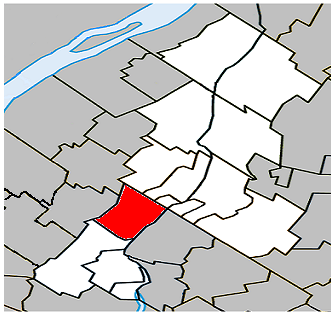
- Située dans La Vallée-du-Richelieu RCM.

- Située dans le sud du Québec.
- Coordinates: 45°32′N 73°17′W
- Country: Canada
- Province: Quebec
- Region: Montérégie
- RCM: La Vallée-du-Richelieu
- Constituted: June 15, 1871

Government
  - Mayor: Kim Méthot
  - Federal riding: Montarville
  - Prov. riding: Chambly

Area
  - Total: 36.90 km^{2} (14.25 sq mi)
  - Land: 35.84 km^{2} (13.84 sq mi)

Population (2021)
  - Total: 17,053
  - Density: 475.8/km^{2} (1,232/sq mi)
  - Pop 2016–2021: ▼0%
  - Dwellings: 6,635
- Time zone: UTC– 05:00 (EST)
  - Summer (DST): UTC– 04:00 (EDT)
- Postal code(s): J3N
- Area codes: 450 and 579
- Highways: R-116
- Website: www.ville.saint- basile-le-grand.qc.ca

Saint-Basile-le-Grand (French pronunciation: [sɛ̃ bazil lə ɡʁɑ̃]) is a South Shore suburb of Montreal. It is located in La Vallée-du-Richelieu Regional County Municipality in southwestern Quebec, Canada. The population as of the 2021 Canadian Census was 17,053.

== History ==
On June 15, 1871, Saint-Basile-le-Grand was created from territories coming from Saint-Bruno-de-Montarville and Saint-Joseph-de-Chambly. On June 7, 1969, the municipality obtained its status as a city. Its territory, the majority of which is still agricultural, occupies an area of 35.84 km2 between the Richelieu River and Mont Saint-Bruno.

On August 23, 1988, after there was a huge fire after arson at a PCB warehouse, there was a large-scale evacuation of part of the town and the downwind area.

For several years now, the citizens of Saint-Basile-le-Grand are able to take advantage of the commuter train. The station located at the corner of boulevard du Millénaire and boulevard Sir-Wilfrid-Laurier (Route 116) also led, in 2004, to the construction of a small shopping center called "Place de la gare".

=== The Church ===
The church was finished at the beginning of January 1877, after a little less than a year of work. The church was built on land donated by Basile Daigneault.

Here is a quote from Mr. Moreau who went to the stone house of Basile Daigneault to hold his meeting:

"Built [the house] on the land with Mr. Basile Daigneault as a neighbor on both sides, on Rang des Vingt-Quatre, /…/, it was found that the majority of the freeholder inhabitants wanted to buy it. Consequently, the meeting, considering that Mr. Basile Daigneault, owner of the land on which the said house is located, land which he offered free of charge to the deputy of Monsignor of Montreal to build the church, presbytery and other dependencies of the said parish, without including, however, the said stone house which is built there, asks to sell the said house, before making the contracts of the said land, so that, later, it will serve as a presbytery. ».

=== The "Bunker" ===
Saint-Basile-le-Grand also has its place of choice in the history of organized crime. Indeed, a fortified square was erected there in the 1990s, at 28 rue Alvarès. The property belonged to a satellite club of the Hells Angels, the Evil Ones. This was in the sights of the municipality in the early 2000s, when a regulation prohibiting fortifications (bulletproof glass, maximum exterior cameras and limitation of the height of fences) was adopted by the city council.

The bunker was seized during the roundup of Operation South in February 2004 to finally be destroyed in January 2006.

== Demographics ==
In the 2021 Census of Population conducted by Statistics Canada, Saint-Basile-le-Grand had a population of 17,053 living in 6,561 of its 6,635 total private dwellings, a change of −0% from its 2016 population of 17,059. With a land area of 35.84 km^{2} (13.84 sq mi), it had a population density of 475.8/km^{2} (1,232.3/sq mi) in 2021.

Population trend:

Census	Population	Change (%)
2021	17,053	▼0.0%
2016	17,059	▲1.9%
2011	16,736	▲7.2%
2006	15,605	▲26.0%
2001	12,385	▲5.2%
1996	11,771	▲16.2%
1991	10,127	▲14.4%
1986	8,852	▲15.7%
1981	7,652	▲31.0%
1976	5,843	▲32.7%
1971	4,402	▲29.7%
1966	3,395	▲71.9%
1961	1,975	▲35.4%
1956	1,459	▲27.5%
1951	1,144	▲34.9%
1941	848	▲18.3%
1931	717	▲11.9%
1921	641	▼8.4%
1911	700	▲1.4%
1901	690	▲1.0%
1891	683	▼2.4%
1881	700	N/A

Mother tongue language (2021)

Language	Population	Pct (%)
French only	15,245	89.4%
English only	505	3.0%
Both English and French	235	1.4%
Other languages	945	5.5%

== Economy ==
Northvolt Six, a giga lithium-ion battery plant, is planned to be built in Saint-Basile-le-Grand. The plant will have an annual cell production capacity of 60 GWh, with adjacent facilities for the production of active cathode and recycling materials. This will be Northvolt's first plant outside Europe. Construction of the first 30 GWh phase of the project is expected to begin by the end of 2023 and the first batteries are expected to be delivered in 2026.

== Infrastructure ==
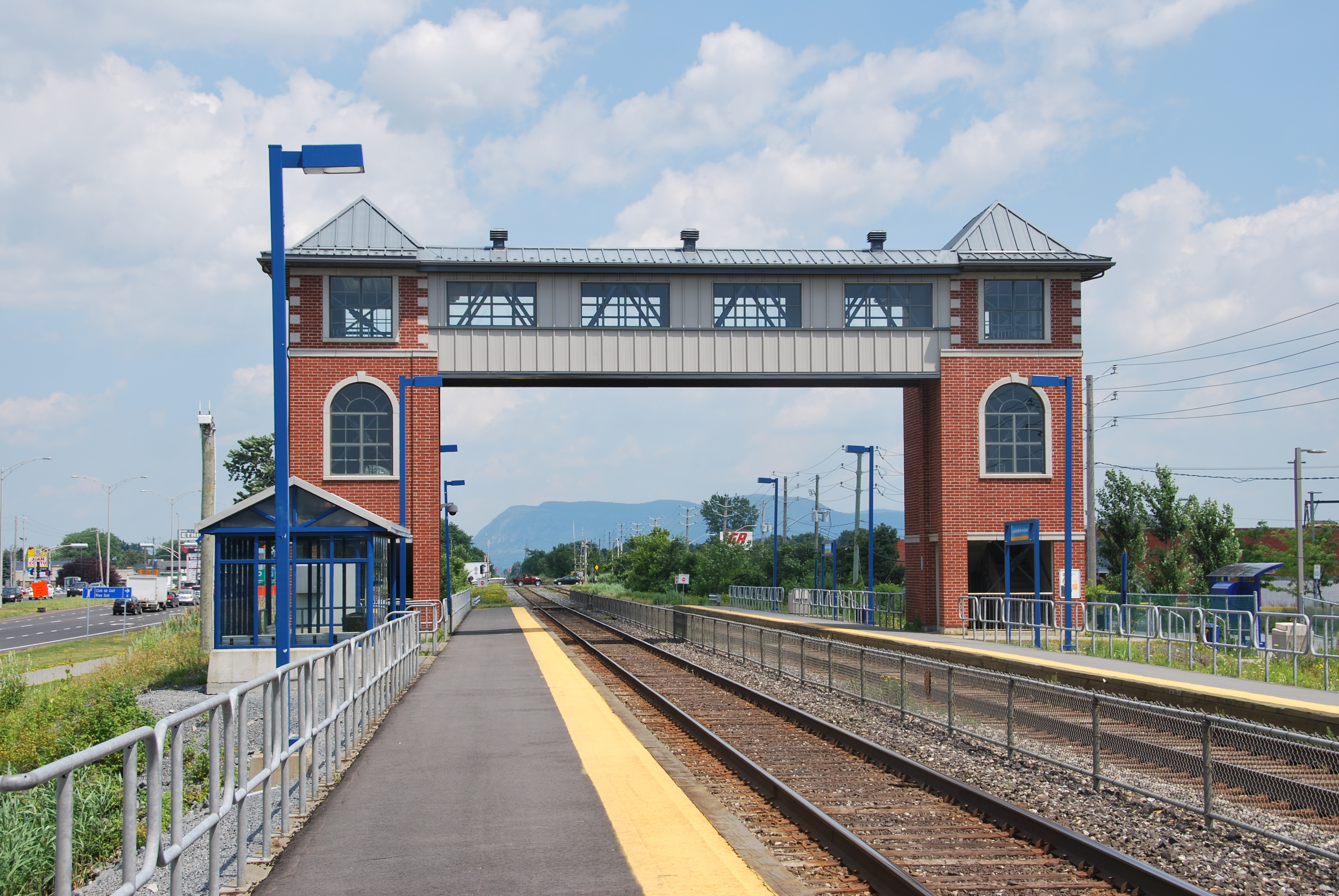
Train station in Saint-Basile.

Saint-Basile-le-Grand is served by the Saint-Basile-le-Grand, a commuter rail station on the Exo's Mont-Saint-Hilaire line. Local bus service is provided by the Exo de la Vallée du Richelieu sector.

== Education ==
The South Shore Protestant Regional School Board previously served the municipality.

== Notable people ==
- Yves Lessard Former mayor

== See also ==
- List of towns in Quebec
