= Saint-Bruno station =

Railway station in Quebec, Canada

Saint-Bruno
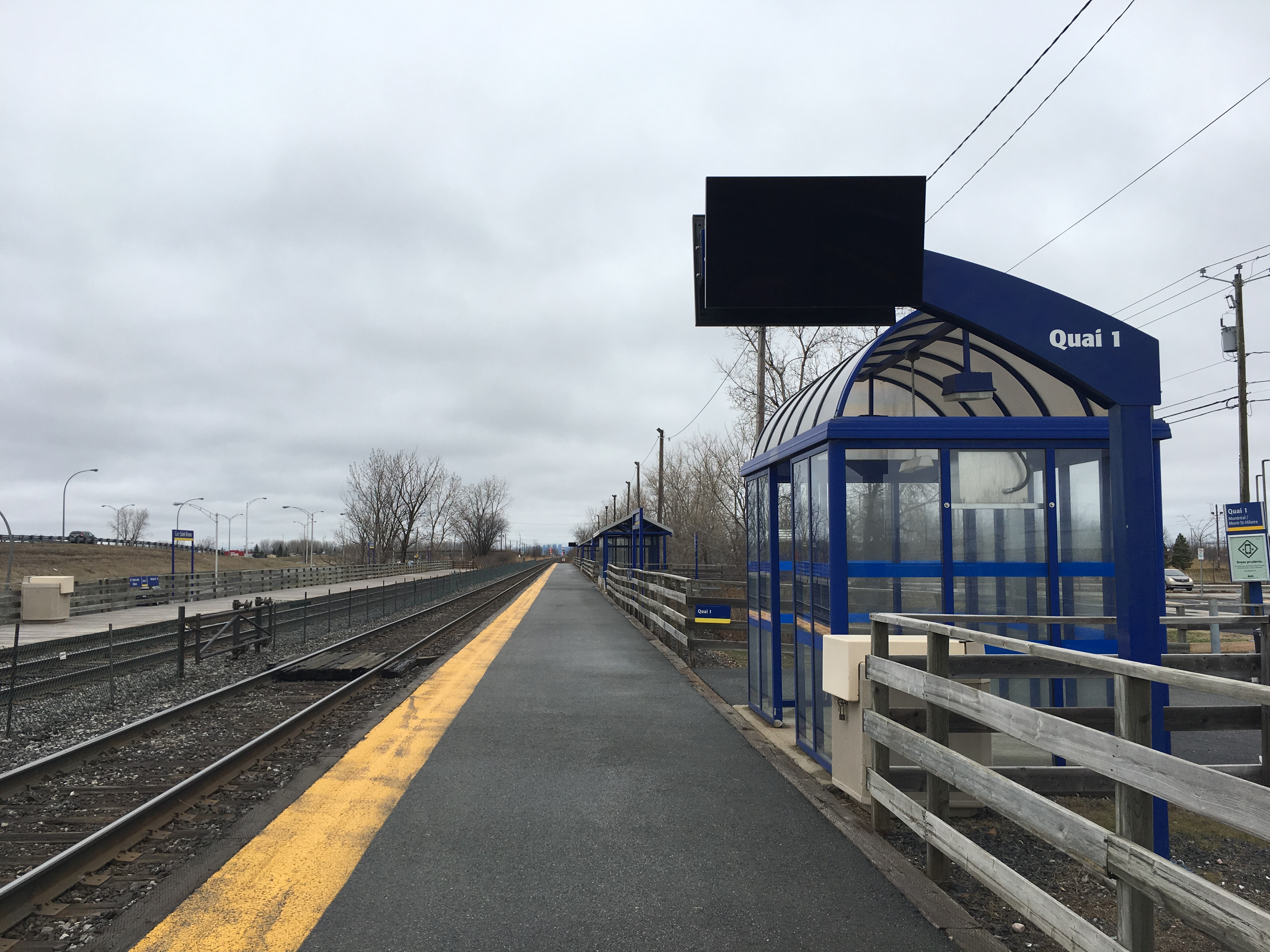

General information
- Location: 1200 Lenoir Street; Saint-Bruno-de-Montarville, Quebec J3V 6P4
- Coordinates: 45°30′43″N 73°22′27″W
- Operator: Exo
- Platforms: 2 side platforms
- Connections: Réseau de transport de Longueuil

Construction
- Parking: 548 spaces
- Cycle facilities: 35 spaces

Other information
- Fare zone: ARTM: B
- Website: Saint-Bruno station (RTM)

History
- Opened: May 29, 2000

Passengers
- 2019: 305,900 (Exo)

Services
| Preceding station | Exo | Following station |
|---|---|---|
| Longueuil–Saint-Hubert toward Montreal | Line 13 – Mont-Saint-Hilaire | Saint-Basile-le-Grand toward Mont-Saint-Hilaire |
Former services at St. Bruno (CN)
| Preceding station | Canadian National Railway | Following station |
|---|---|---|
| St. Hubert toward Montreal | Montreal – Portland | Montarville toward Portland |
Location

Saint-Bruno station (French pronunciation: [sɛ̃ bʁyno]) is a commuter rail station operated by Exo in Saint-Bruno-de-Montarville, Quebec, Canada.

It is served by the Mont-Saint-Hilaire line.

== Connecting bus routes ==
Réseau de transport de Longueuil
| No. | Route | Connects to | Service times / notes |
|---|---|---|---|
| 93 | Gare Saint-Bruno / Montarville / Yvonne-Duckett | | Weekdays, peak only |
| On-demand | RTL à la demande Saint-Bruno-de-Montarville | | |
