= Saint-Basile-le-Grand station =

Railway station in Quebec, Canada

Saint-Basile-le-Grand
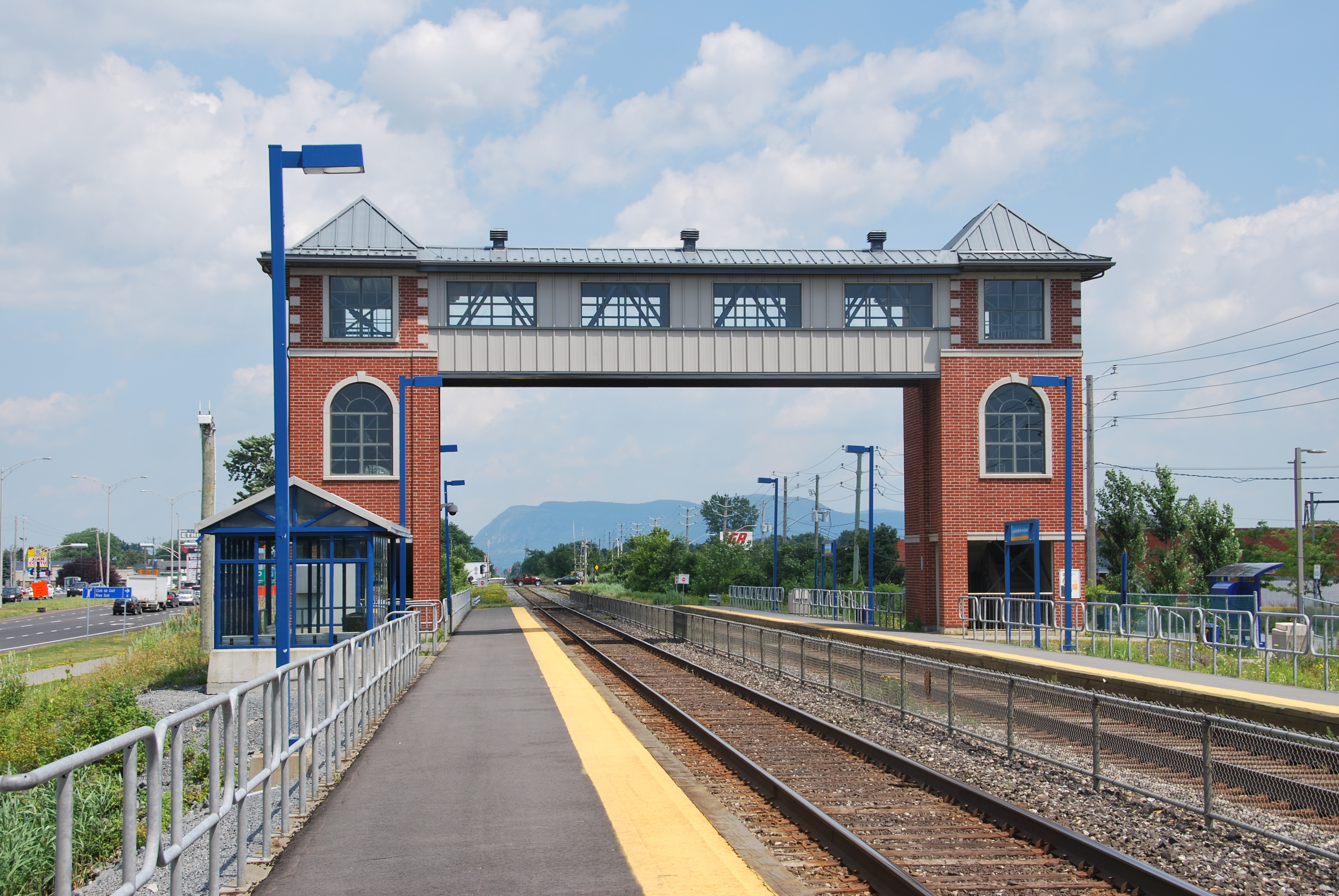

General information
- Location: 121 Station Street; Saint-Basile-le-Grand, Quebec J3N 1T8
- Coordinates: 45°31′24″N 73°18′21″W
- Operator: Exo
- Platforms: 2 side platforms
- Tracks: 2
- Connections: Exo bus services

Construction
- Parking: 444 spaces
- Cycle facilities: 143 spaces

Other information
- Fare zone: ARTM: C
- Website: Saint-Basile-le-Grand station (RTM)

History
- Opened: November 3, 2003

Passengers
- 2019: 385,500 (Exo)

Services
Preceding station	Exo	Following station
Saint-Bruno toward Montreal	Line 13 – Mont-Saint-Hilaire	McMasterville toward Mont-Saint-Hilaire
Former services at CN station
Preceding station	Canadian National Railway	Following station
Montarville toward Montreal	Montreal – Portland	Beloeil toward Portland
Location

Saint-Basile-le-Grand station (French pronunciation: [sɛ̃ bazil lə ɡʁɑ̃]) is a commuter rail station operated by Exo in Saint-Basile-le-Grand, Quebec, Canada.

It is served by the Mont-Saint-Hilaire line.

== Connecting bus routes ==
Exo de la Vallée du Richelieu sector
No.	Route	Connects to	Service times / notes
200	Saint-Hyacinthe - Longueuil	Longueuil–Université-de-Sherbrooke; McMasterville	Daily
201	ExpressO Mont-Saint-Hilaire - Longueuil	Longueuil–Université-de-Sherbrooke; McMasterville	Weekdays, peak only
300	Saint-Hyacinthe - Terminus Brossard	Brossard; Mont-Saint-Hilaire; McMasterville	Weekdays only
