= McMasterville =

- City
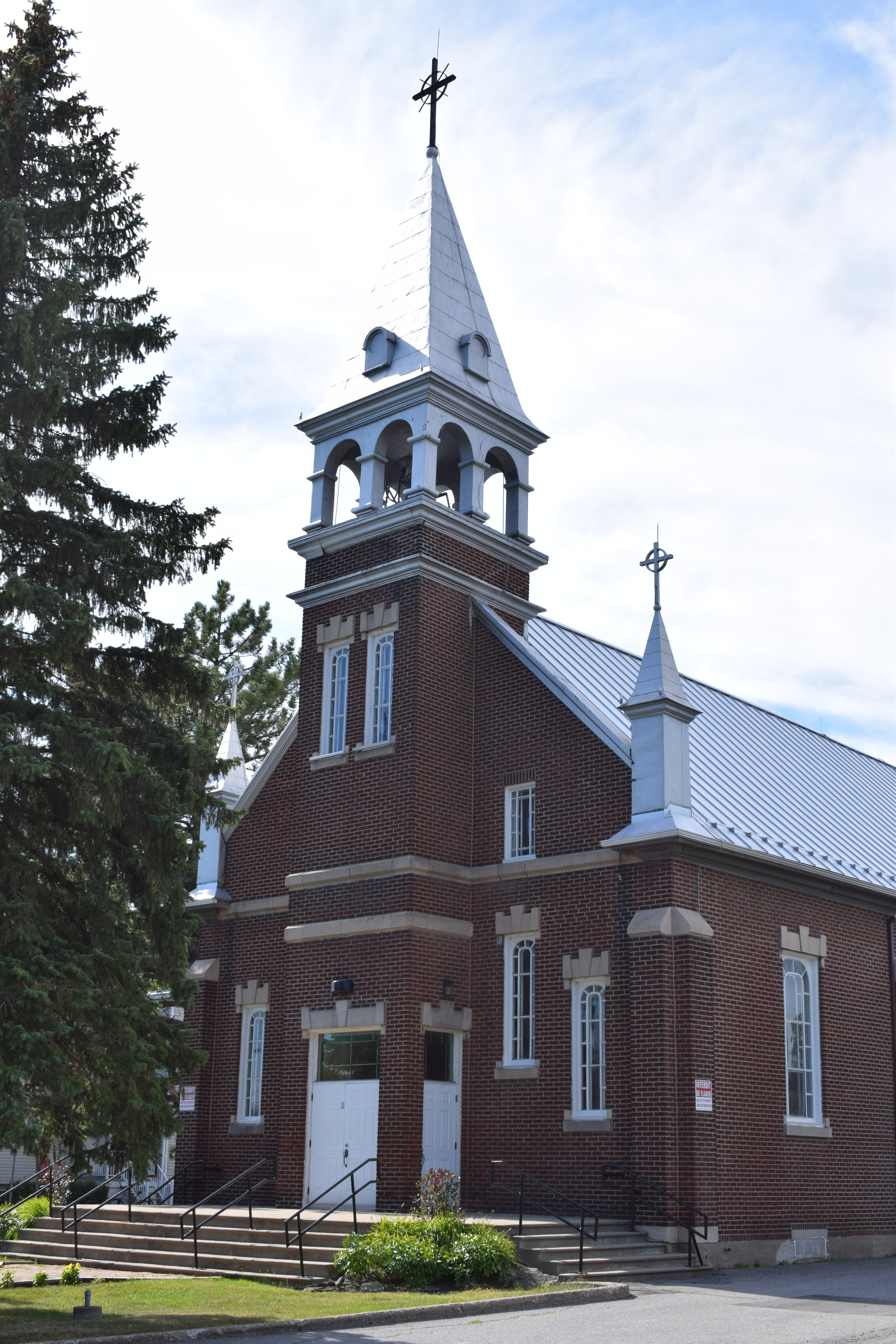
- Sacré Coeur de Jésus church

- Seal

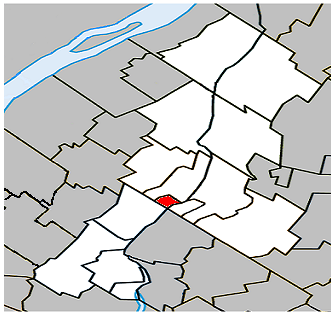
- Location within La Vallée-du-Richelieu RCM.

- Location in southern Quebec.
- Coordinates: 45°33′N 73°14′W
- Country: Canada
- Province: Quebec
- Region: Montérégie
- RCM: La Vallée-du-Richelieu
- Constituted: July 31, 1917

Government
  - Mayor: Magalie Taillon
  - Federal riding: Beloeil—Chambly
  - Prov. riding: Borduas

Area
  - Total: 3.40 km^{2} (1.31 sq mi)
  - Land: 3.12 km^{2} (1.20 sq mi)

Population (2021)
  - Total: 5,936
  - Density: 1,904/km^{2} (4,930/sq mi)
  - Pop 2016-2021: ▲4.2%
  - Dwellings: 2,459
- Time zone: UTC−5 (EST)
  - Summer (DST): UTC−4 (EDT)
- Postal code(s): J3G 6N9
- Area codes: 450 and 579
- Highways: R-116; R-223
- Website: www.mcmasterville.ca

McMasterville is a city in southwestern Quebec, Canada on the Richelieu River in La Vallée-du-Richelieu Regional County Municipality. The population as of the 2021 Canadian Census was 5,936. It is within the Administrative Region of Montérégie.

== History ==
The town was founded in 1917 to house workers of the Canadian Explosives Limited which operated until 1998. The town is named after the first chairman of that company, William McMaster.

== Geography ==
McMasterville is located along the Richelieu River, on the shore facing Mont-Saint-Hilaire and Otterburn Park.

== Demographics ==
=== Population ===
Population trend:

| Census | Population | Change (%) |
|---|---|---|
| 2021 | 5,936 | ▲4.2% |
| 2016 | 5,695 | ▲1.5% |
| 2011 | 5,615 | ▲7.3% |
| 2006 | 5,234 | ▲31.4% |
| 2001 | 3,984 | ▲4.5% |
| 1996 | 3,813 | ▲3.4% |
| 1991 | 3,689 | ▲0.7% |
| 1986 | 3,665 | ▲1.5% |
| 1981 | 3,612 | ▲13.4% |
| 1976 | 3,184 | ▲26.4% |
| 1971 | 2,518 | ▲2.5% |
| 1966 | 2,456 | ▲18.4% |
| 1961 | 2,075 | ▲19.4% |
| 1956 | 1,738 | ▲15.2% |
| 1951 | 1,509 | ▲37.6% |
| 1941 | 1,097 | ▲33.9% |
| 1931 | 819 | ▲33.8% |
| 1921 | 612 | N/A |

=== Language ===
Mother tongue language (2021)

| Language | Population | Pct (%) |
|---|---|---|
| French only | 5,445 | 91.7% |
| English only | 195 | 3.3% |
| Both English and French | 105 | 1.8% |
| Other languages | 165 | 2.8% |

== Economy ==
In September 2023 the Swedish upstart Northvolt formally announced plans to build a 60 GWh/year battery cell factory on the grounds of the former CIL factory around which McMasterville was once founded. The factory was expected to start producing cells in 2026 and to employ a staff of 3000. The factory would be heavily subsidised by Canada, Quebec and Ottawa.

== Infrastructure ==
Since 2000, McMasterville is served by the McMasterville commuter rail station on the EXO's Mont-Saint-Hilaire line. Local bus service is also provided by EXO.

== Education ==
The town is host to the École d'éducation internationale which offers secondary level education where students can follow the International Baccalaureate Middle Years Programme as defined by the IBO. A primary school, École la Farandole, is also present.

The South Shore Protestant Regional School Board previously served the city.

== See also ==
- List of cities in Quebec
