= Mont-Saint-Hilaire line =

Commuter rail service in Greater Montreal, Quebec

Mont-Saint-Hilaire
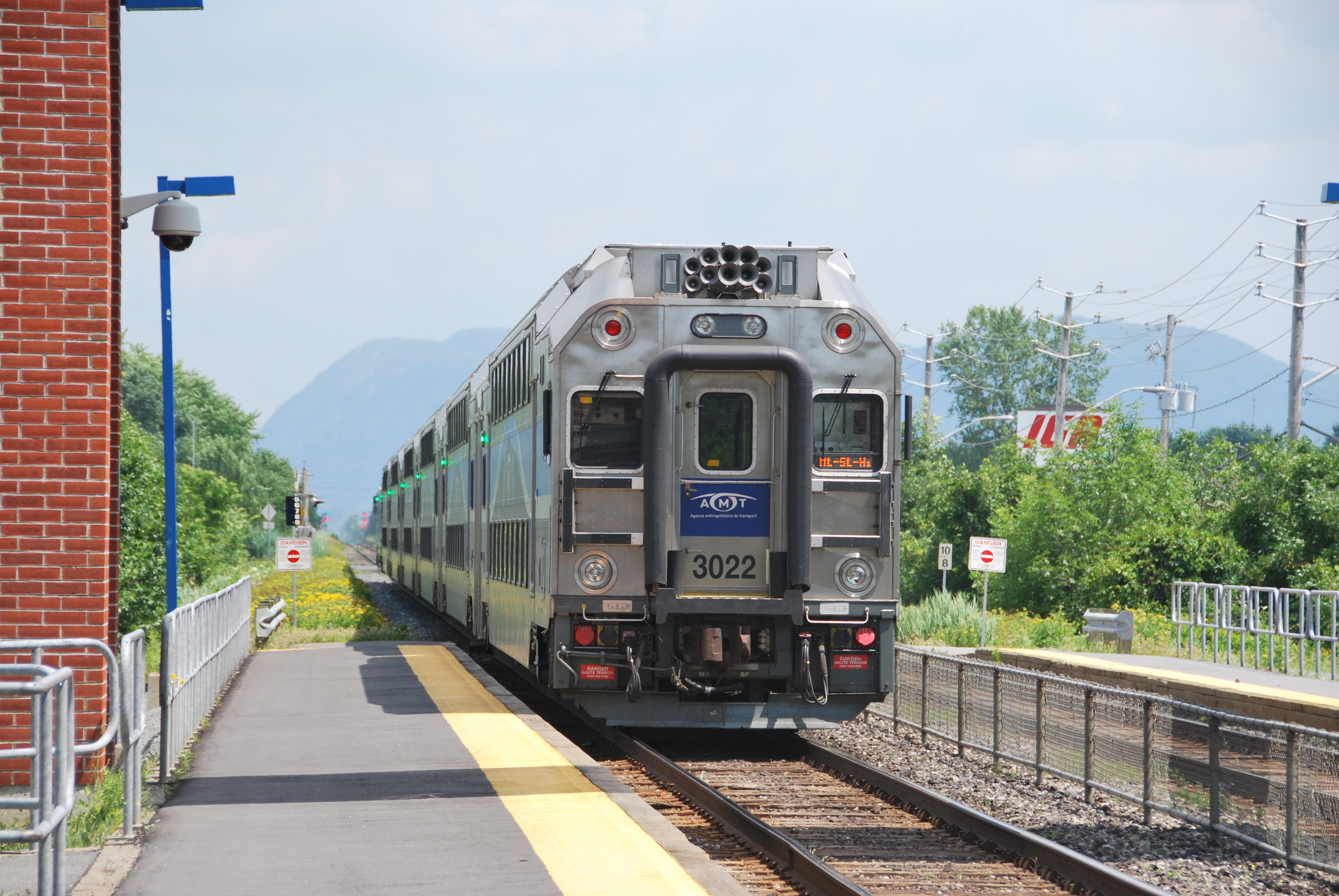
- Outbound train at Saint-Basile-le-Grand

Overview
- Owner: Exo
- Line number: 13
- Locale: Greater Montreal
- Termini: Central Station; Mont-Saint-Hilaire
- Stations: 7
- Website: Exo - Mont-Saint-Hilaire line

Service
- Type: Commuter rail
- System: Exo commuter rail
- Operator(s): Alstom
- Daily ridership: 3,790 (2025)
- Ridership: 989,275 (2025)

History
- Opened: 1859

Technical
- Line length: 34.9 km (21.7 mi)
- Track gauge: 1,435 mm (4 ft 8 1/2 in) standard gauge
Route map
Mont-Saint-Hilaire line highlighted in purple

Mont-Saint-Hilaire (also designated line 13) is a commuter rail service in Greater Montreal, Quebec. It is operated by Exo, the organization that operates the commuter rail network in Greater Montreal.

The Mont-Saint-Hilaire line was operated by the Grand Trunk Railway (GTR) from 1859 to 1923, and by Canadian National Railway (CN) from 1923 to 1988, following the GTR's merger into CN. There was no commuter train service on the line after 1988 until Exo's predecessor agency, the Agence Métropolitaine de transport (AMT), resumed passenger service in 2000.

There are 7 inbound and 7 outbound departures per weekday. This line does not run on weekends.

== Overview ==
This line links the Central Station in downtown Montreal with Mont-Saint-Hilaire, on Montreal's South Shore. As of January 2026, it is the only Exo Commuter Rail line that still serves Central Station.

The line offers seven departures every weekday morning towards Montreal and seven returns to Saint-Hilaire every weekday evening. It is also the only commuter train line not to have any train stations on the island of Montreal outside of Downtown Montreal. All the other train lines have at least 4 stops before leaving the island.

The trains are owned and managed by Exo, and operated by Alstom's Transportation division (formerly Bombardier Transportation).

== History ==
=== GTR/CN service ===
The line was opened by the Grand Trunk in 1859. CN rolling stock in the late 1960s and early 1970s, operated once daily each direction, was a hodgepodge of ca 1930 coaches and an equally eclectic mix of yard switchers, freight and passenger diesel electric engines. Service was suspended in 1988, due to low ridership and old equipment used.

=== Central Station – Saint-Isidore shuttle service ===
During the Oka Crisis in the summer of 1990, the Société de transport de la communauté urbaine de Montréal (STCUM) organized a temporary rail shuttle service between Montreal Central Station and the town of Saint-Isidore due to the closure of the Honoré Mercier Bridge during said crisis. That service used part of the present-day Mont-Saint-Hilaire line between Montreal Central Station and Saint-Lambert station via Victoria Bridge, and then branched off to the CN Rouses Point Subdivision towards Saint-Isidore.

=== AMT service ===
The Mont-Saint-Hilaire line was re-opened in 2000 (between Montreal Central Station and McMasterville) by the AMT as a measure to mitigate traffic congestion caused by roadwork. Train service was progressively increased to respond to rapidly growing demand. The line was extended to its current terminus at Mont-Saint-Hilaire in 2002.

=== RTM/Exo service ===
On June 1, 2017, the AMT was dissolved and replaced by two new governing bodies, the Autorité régionale de transport métropolitain (ARTM) and the Réseau de transport métropolitain (RTM). The RTM took over all former AMT services, including this line.

In May 2018, the RTM rebranded itself as Exo, and rebranded each line with a number and updated colour. The Mont-Saint-Hilaire line became Exo 3, and its line colour was updated to a lighter pastel shade of violet. In 2023, the service was renumbered to line 13 in order to be unique within the Montreal rail network.

== Future proposals ==
In 2019, civic organization Trajectoire Québec proposed several improvements to the Mont-Saint-Hilaire line, which has seen little service changes since the early-2000s. Among such proposals are increasing the frequency of trains to accommodate passengers transferring from South Shore bus services that would no longer directly run to Downtown Montreal following the opening of the Réseau express métropolitain, relocating the Saint-Bruno station closer to residential neighbourhoods and potentially extending passenger service to Saint-Hyacinthe.

== List of stations ==
The following stations are on the Mont-Saint-Hilaire line:

Station	Location	Connections	Zones
Central Station	Montreal	Via Rail; Amtrak; Réseau express métropolitain; Terminus Centre-Ville; Bonaventure station; Buses	A
Saint-Lambert	Saint-Lambert	Via Rail; Amtrak; Réseau de transport de Longueuil: 1, 6, 55	B
Longueuil–Saint-Hubert	Saint-Hubert	Réseau de transport de Longueuil: 8, 22, 88, 128, 428, 442	B
Saint-Bruno	Saint-Bruno	Réseau de transport de Longueuil: 93	B
Saint-Basile-le-Grand	Saint-Basile-le-Grand	Exo: 200, 201, 300	C
McMasterville	McMasterville	Exo: 20B, 200, 201, 300	C
Mont-Saint-Hilaire	Mont-Saint-Hilaire	Exo: 21, 25, 300	C

The commuter line operates over the following Canadian National subdivision:

- Saint-Hyacinthe Subdivision (between St-Hilaire [54.2] and Montreal [74.1])
