= McMasterville station =

Railway station in Quebec, Canada

McMasterville
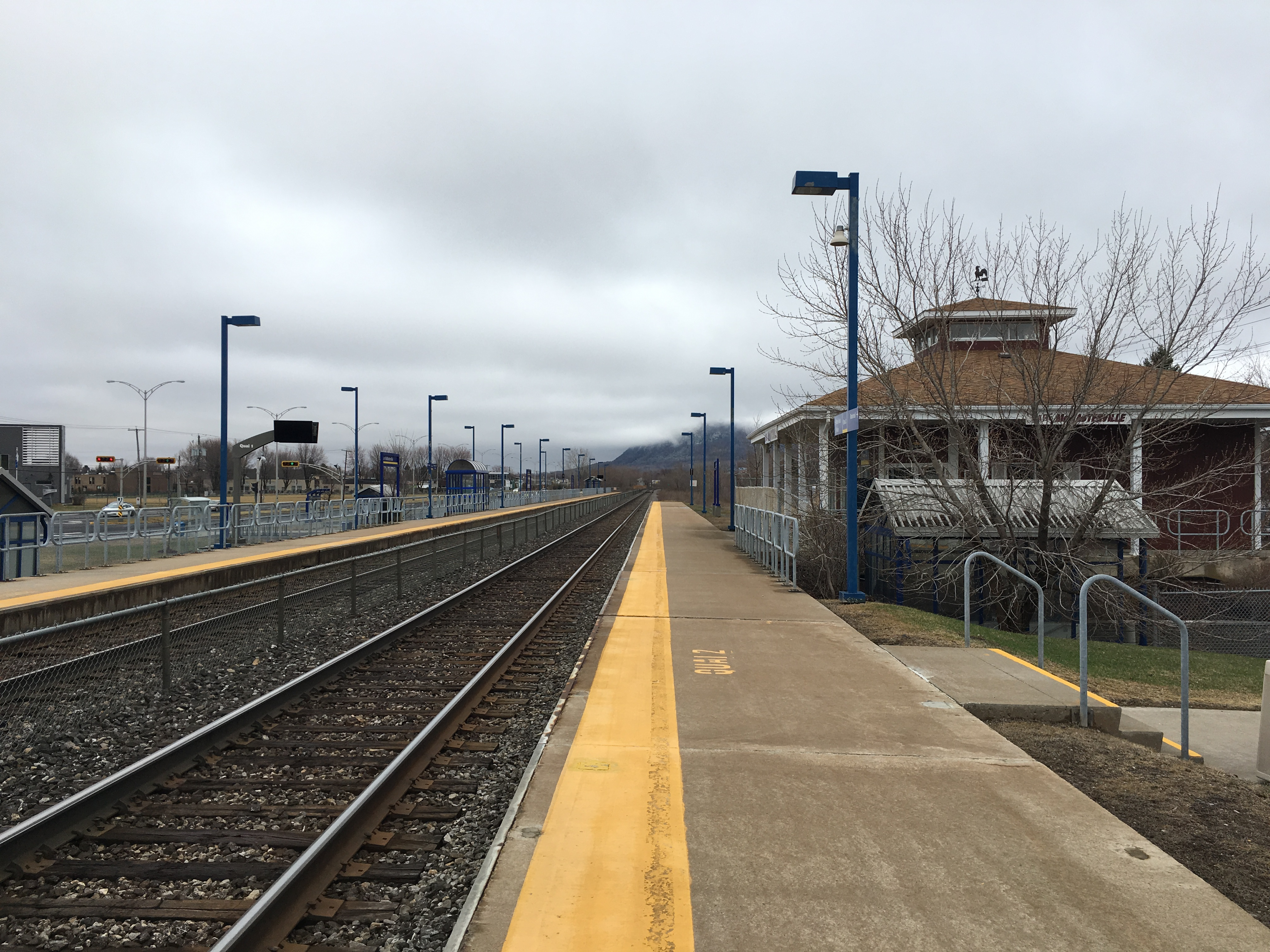

General information
- Location: 399 Purvis Club Street, McMasterville, Quebec J3G 6S5
- Coordinates: 45°32′45″N 73°13′50″W
- Operator: Exo
- Platforms: 2 side platforms
- Tracks: 2
- Connections: Exo bus services

Construction
- Parking: 723 spaces
- Cycle facilities: 37 spaces

Other information
- Fare zone: ARTM: C
- Website: McMasterville station (RTM)

History
- Opened: May 29, 2000

Passengers
- 2019: 300,800 (Exo)

Services
Preceding station	Exo	Following station
Saint-Basile-le-Grand toward Montreal	Line 13 – Mont-Saint-Hilaire	Mont-Saint-Hilaire Terminus
Location

McMasterville station is a commuter rail station operated by Exo in McMasterville, Quebec, Canada.

It is served by the Mont-Saint-Hilaire line.

== Connecting bus routes ==
Exo Vallée-du-Richelieu
No.	Route	Connects to	Service times / notes
20B	Beloeil		Weekdays, peak only
200	Saint-Hyacinthe - Longueuil	Longueuil–Université-de-Sherbrooke; Saint-Basile-le-Grand	Daily
201	ExpressO Mont-Saint-Hilaire - Longueuil	Longueuil–Université-de-Sherbrooke; Saint-Basile-le-Grand	Weekdays, peak only
300	Saint-Hyacinthe - Terminus Brossard	Brossard; Mont-Saint-Hilaire; Saint-Basile-le-Grand	Weekdays only
