= Mont-Saint-Hilaire station =

Railway station in Quebec, Canada

Mont-Saint-Hilaire
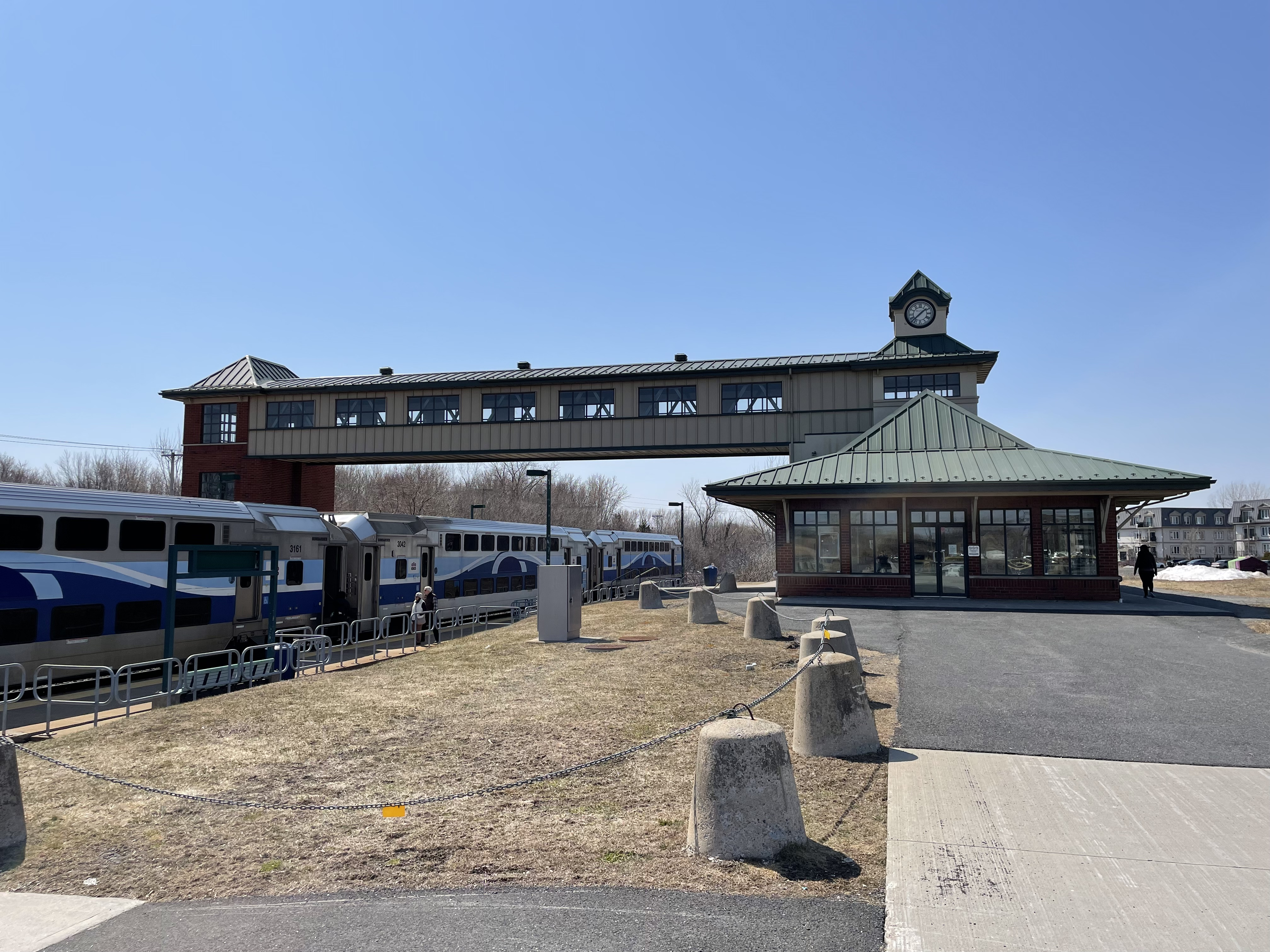

General information
- Location: 1000 Station Avenue; Mont-Saint-Hilaire, Quebec J3H 3X2
- Coordinates: 45°34′38″N 73°10′43″W
- Operator: Exo
- Platforms: 2 side platforms
- Tracks: 2
- Connections: Exo bus services

Construction
- Parking: 837 spaces
- Cycle facilities: 29 spaces

Other information
- Fare zone: ARTM: C
- Website: Mont-Saint-Hilaire station (RTM)

History
- Opened: September 3, 2002

Passengers
- 2019: 478,600 (Exo)

Services
Preceding station	Exo	Following station
McMasterville toward Montreal	Line 13 – Mont-Saint-Hilaire	Terminus
Former services at St. Hilaire (CN)
Preceding station	Canadian National Railway	Following station
Beloeil toward Montreal	Montreal – Moncton	Ste. Madeleine toward Moncton
Otterburn Park toward Montreal	Montreal – Portland	St. Hilaire East toward Portland
Location

Mont-Saint-Hilaire station (French pronunciation: [mɔ̃ sɛ̃t‿ilɛʁ]) is a commuter rail station operated by Exo in Mont-Saint-Hilaire, Quebec, Canada.

It is the eastern terminus of the Mont-Saint-Hilaire line.

== Connecting bus routes ==
Exo Vallée-du-Richelieu
No.	Route	Connects to	Services times / notes
21	Mont-Saint-Hilaire (La Pommeraie)		Weekdays, peak only
25	Saint-Hyacinthe - Mont-Saint-Hilaire		Weekdays, peak only
300	Saint-Hyacinthe - Terminus Brossard	Brossard; Saint-Basile-le-Grand; McMasterville	Weekdays only
