= Gallery Car =

Bilevel passenger railcar

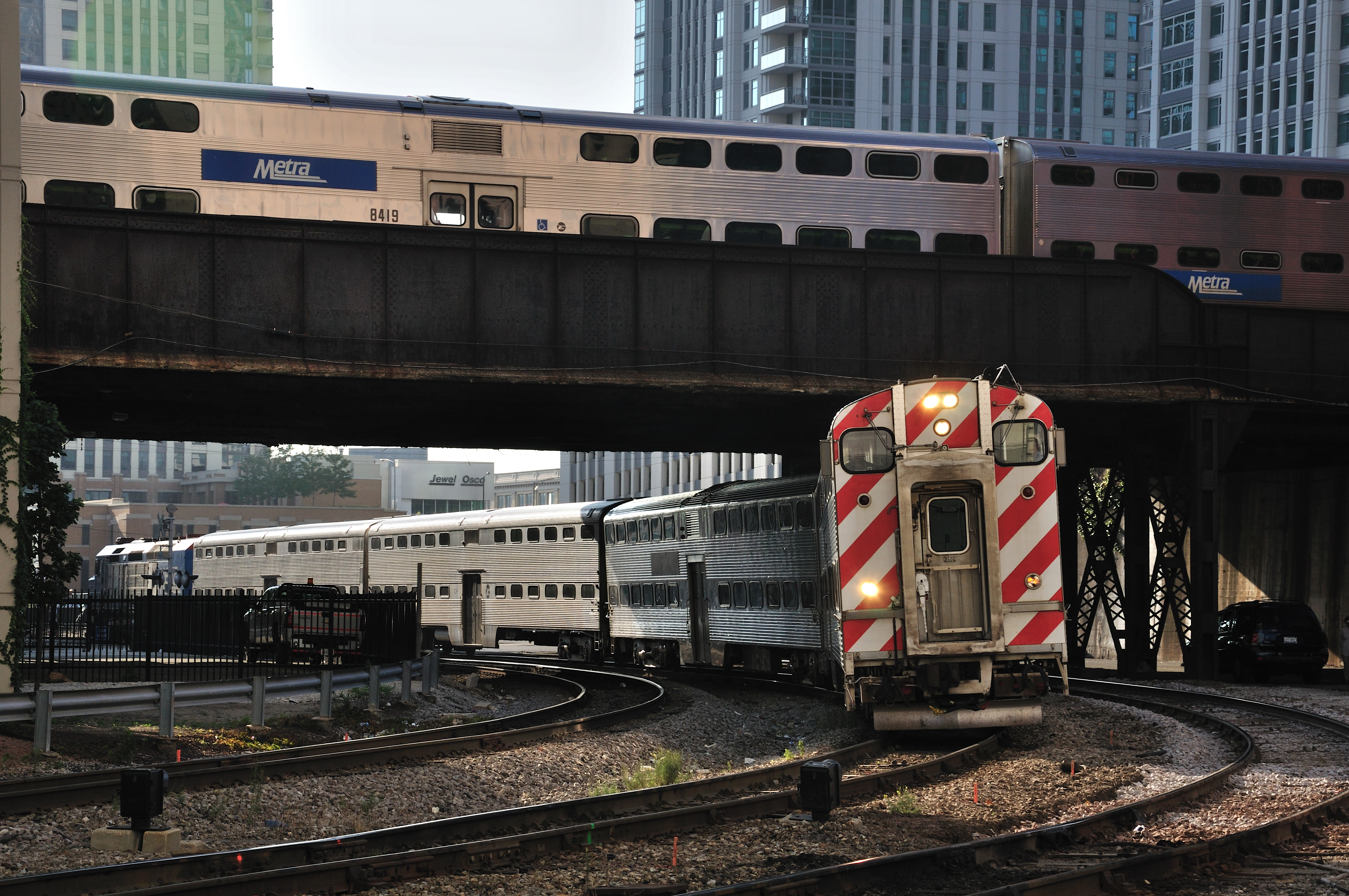
- Metra Gallery Cars at Canal St., Chicago
- Manufacturers: Budd Company, Pullman-Standard, St. Louis Car Co., American Car & Foundry, Canadian Vickers, Amerail, and Nippon Sharyo
- Constructed: 1950-present
- Entered service: 1950-present
- Capacity: 148-169

Specifications
- Car body construction: LAHT steel body on a steel frame
- Car length: 85 feet (26 m)
- Entry: Step
- Doors: 1 per side
- Track gauge: 4 ft 8 1/2 in (1,435 mm) standard gauge

The Gallery Car is a bilevel rail car, originally created by the Budd Company in 1950 for Commuter Operations on the Chicago, Burlington & Quincy Railroad's Suburban Service. Besides Budd, it has had six total different manufacturers since its creation, being Pullman-Standard, St. Louis Car Company, American Car & Foundry, Canadian Vickers, Amerail, and Nippon Sharyo. Many of these double-decker passenger cars were built by Budd and Pullman-Standard between the 1950s and 1970s for various passenger rail operators in the United States, with a small order by Canadian Vickers for service in Canada.

The car is designed with the first floor at what would normally be considered "high platform" level, and originally featured bench seating. The second level is actually four separate balconies with single seating that are accessed by four spiral staircases in the central vestibule. The space between the balconies is left open to allow conductors to check tickets without going upstairs. The doors are located in the middle of the car along with a bathroom.

== Design ==
=== Railcar ===
The Gallery Car is made of the typical stainless steel for North American coaches and is a bilevel, however a unique design feature is a drop down in the middle of the 2nd floor to the first floor. This choice was made in particular to allow conductors to make a single pass through the car to collect passenger fares instead of having to go to each floor.

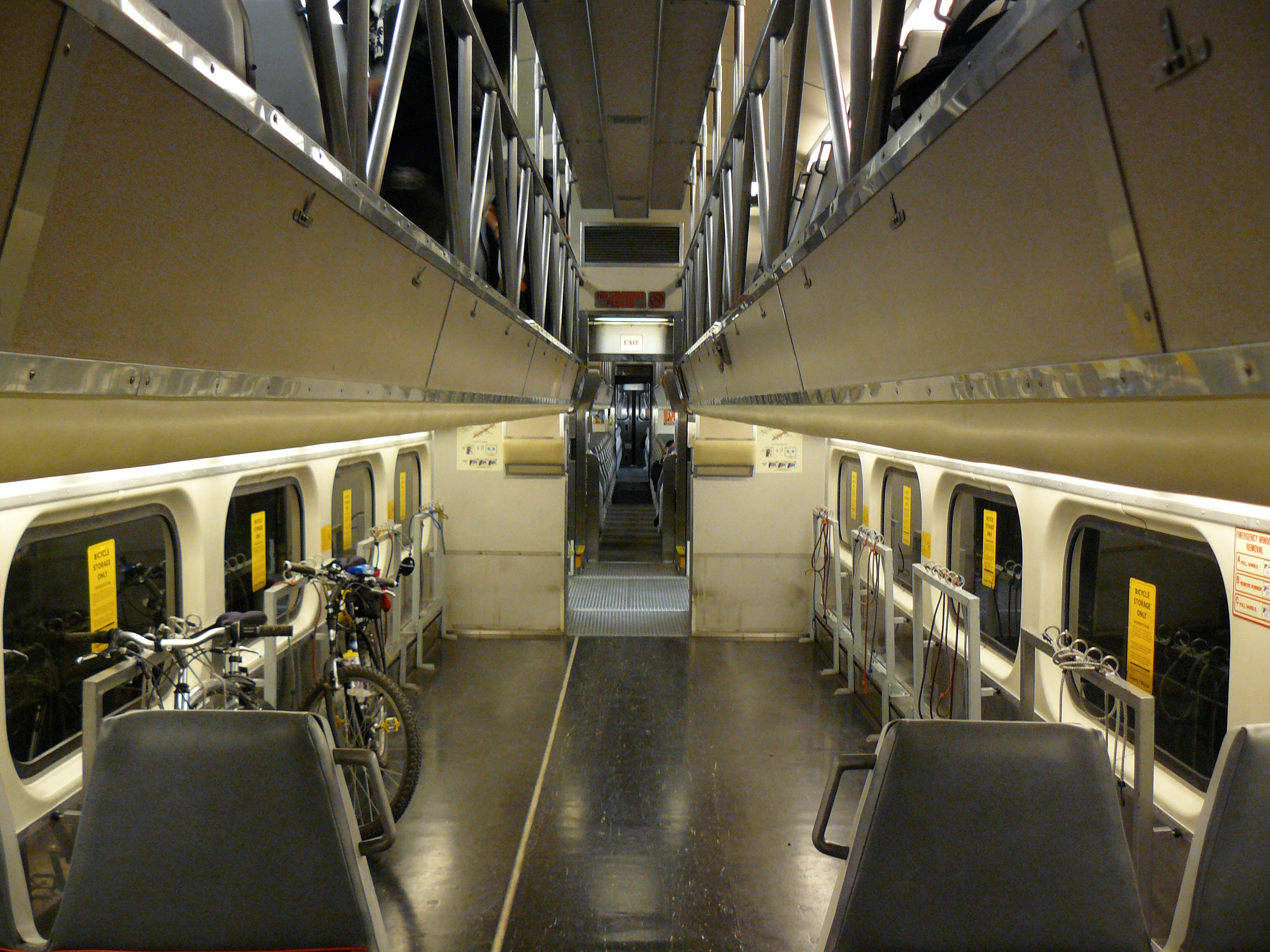
A Caltrain Bike Car, also showing the dropdown in the middle of the second floor

The car height is near the same as a Superliner (16' 2"), being only approximately four inches shorter, at 15' 10": The height varies between brands, such as when comparing a Budd to an Amerail.

BNSF have their own versions of Budd's design with differently designed trucks and body from all other designs, along with text over the doors such as "BURLINGTON" or "BNSF RAILWAY," and a modern BNSF decal next to the doors.

The windows are not the same across the brands either and are the easiest identifiers (with designs building on each other):

- The Pullman have short-heighted chamfered windows.
- The Budds/Canadian Vickers shorten them horizontally and round them off.
  - The BNSF Budds are a mix of the previous two, not shortened but rounded off.
- The Amerails increase them in size vertically.
- The Nippon Sharyos again increase them in size all around, making them the largest ones.

=== Highliner II ===
An electric multiple unit (EMU) variant of the railcar has been produced by Nippon Sharyo, of which only Metra and the NICTD South Shore Line own and operate. They operate on overhead wires, and only have cab car variants designed to be in sets of 2. For Metra, they are the replacement to the original Highliners which had a similar interior design.

== History ==
After the end of World War II, suburban Cook County and the surrounding Collar Counties in the Chicago Metropolitan Area experienced rapid population growth, and the Chicago, Burlington & Quincy Railroad (CB&Q) began increasing the length of its suburban commuter trains to meet growing demand after years of declining ridership before the war. Like other commuter rail services in the United States, the CB&Q carried commuter passengers in heavyweight and wood-bodied coaches, with the newest dating back to the early 1930s and the oldest dating back to the late 19th century. The increasing length of the CB&Q's commuter trains began to strain capacity at the service's eastern terminal at Chicago Union Station. With no room for additional track and platform capacity, along with the Chicago Union Station Company (of which the CB&Q was a primary tenant) charging railroads for the use of its facilities on a per-coach basis, Burlington leadership looked for ways to reduce operating expenses and increase capacity without further lengthening trains, while also hoping to financially stabilize its money-losing commuter operations.

In response to these issues, in 1947-48, the CB&Q formed a committee to study commuter operations and equipment used in the New York City and Philadelphia Areas. Partially inspired by the Long Island Rail Road's MP70 Coaches in particular, but seeking to improve on their function and design, the railroad consulted The Budd Company (which had already supplied the railroad with long-distance Zephyr streamlined coaches since 1934) to develop a new lightweight, double-decked bilevel coach that would address these issues. In 1949, the Burlington placed an order with Budd (Budd Lot (Job) No. 9679-041) for thirty new 85-foot lightweight stainless-steel coaches at $152,000 per coach. Budd delivered these cars to the Burlington between August 1950 and January 1951. The Burlington numbered the new cars 700-729, christened them the "Suburbanaire" cars, and inaugurated the coaches into service with a demonstration train on September 6, 1950.

The new coaches were equipped with air conditioning, roller bearings, center-entrance power-operated doors, sealed picture windows, incandescent lighting, and cushioned reversible seats upholstered in synthetic material. Each coach had a total seating capacity for 148 passengers, with room for 96 on the lower level and 52 on the upper levels. The Burlington considered these new coaches a success, claiming that the cars were well received by riders and the local public, while also increasing passenger capacity per coach by 50%. According to a 1964 publication by the Railroad, the modernization of its suburban service was credited with increasing morning rush-hour capacity from approximately 8,000 passengers arriving in Chicago on ten trains between 7:30 and 8:30 a.m. in 1951, to approximately 14,000 passengers on fourteen trains during the same hour span by 1964. This success led the Burlington to place additional orders for more gallery coaches, with an order for 10 (#730-739) placed in 1953, 10 more (#740-749) in 1955, an additional 10 (#750-759) in 1957, and 34 (28 Coaches, 6 Cab-Coaches) in 1965. Further orders were placed by the CB&Q's successor, the Burlington Northern Railroad in 1973 and 1977-78, all from the Budd Company, bringing the total to 141 Gallery Cars by 1978.

Other railroads in the Chicago area saw the success of these new cars and placed orders of their own to improve or save their own ailing commuter operations. By the mid 1950s, the Chicago & North Western Railway was looking to replace their own aging fleet of commuter coaches and placed an order with the St. Louis Car Company for 16 painted steel gallery coaches of their own, which were delivered and placed into service by the Spring of 1955, with the railroad numbering these cars between 1-16. The C&NW's gallery cars had many of the same features as the CB&Q's gallery cars, such as air conditioning, center-entrance power-operated doors, sealed windows, and modern lighting fixtures, but differed by being constructed out of conventional steel instead of stainless steel, being painted in a yellow-and-green paint scheme already used on their "400" Streamliners, and having seating capacity for 169 Passengers. The C&NW's success with its own fleet led the railway to place an order with Pullman-Standard for an additional 32 gallery cars (#17-#48) in 1956, then order new sets of gallery cars with long-distance amenities for their Flambeau 400 and Peninsula 400 Streamliners in 1958, and eventually complete the modernization of its commuter fleet with further orders from Pullman-Standard placed between 1959 and 1970, bringing the C&NW's total to 280 gallery car coaches in commuter service by that point.

By the late 1950s, pleased with their new fleet, the C&NW sought to eliminate the need to switch and turn around locomotives at its station terminals for the return trip. The railway thus placed an order for 50 gallery car coaches equipped with cab compartments that allowed for Push-Pull Operation, a capability already found on Electric Multiple Units. These new cab-coaches were numbered 151-200, and introduced a practice that was subsequently adopted by other passenger rail operators. Today, the first Cab-Coach built for the C&NW (#151), is preserved in operable condition at the Illinois Railway Museum.

Other Chicago-area commuter rail operators that ordered bilevel gallery cars included The Milwaukee Road, which ordered a total of 238 gallery car coaches and cab-coaches for its Commuter Services (including those bought by successor public agencies NWSMTD, Nortran, and RTA) from Budd between 1961 and 1980, and the Rock Island, which ordered 15 gallery car coaches and 5 cab-coaches from Budd in 1965, followed by an additional 5 coaches and 5 cab-coaches from Pullman-Standard in 1970, for a total of 30 gallery cars for its Commuter Service.

Two other private commuter rail operators ordered gallery cars for their own services: Southern Pacific ordered a total of 46 gallery cars for their Peninsula Commute service to replace their last 1900s era "Harriman" coaches, with an initial order of 10 cars from Pullman-Standard in 1955, an additional order for 21 cars from American Car & Foundry in 1957, and a final order of 15 cars from Pullman-Standard in 1968, none of which had push-pull capabilities. In 1968, Canadian Pacific Railway placed an order for 9 gallery cars (7 coaches, 2 cab-coaches) for its "TownTrain" service in the Montréal region, with the coaches being delivered between 1969 and 1970.

As private railroad operators abandoned or transferred ownership of their commuter operations in the 1970s and 1980s, and older passenger car manufacturers either ceased operations or shifted away from passenger car production, newer generations of gallery cars were manufactured to replace the original gallery cars that were beginning to show their age. Between 1985 and 2000, Caltrain (the successor to the SP's Peninsula Commute operations) ordered 93 new gallery cars (66 coaches and 27 cab-coaches) from Nippon Sharyo. The initial order was intended to replace the last of the 1920s-era "Harriman" coaches, along with the entire roster of gallery cars ordered by SP, in preparation for the new agency assuming operations, while the later order was placed to modernize and expand service. Between 1994 and 1998, Metra (the successor to private commuter operations in the Chicagoland area) ordered 176 new gallery cars (97 coaches and 79 cab-coaches) from Morrison-Knudsen/Amerail to replace some of their oldest gallery cars that dated back to the early and mid 1950s. Metra subsequently placed an additional order with Nippon Sharyo for 302 new gallery cars (194 coaches and 108 cab-coaches) between 2002 and 2008. Virginia Railway Express, a startup commuter agency established in 1992, ordered 100 new gallery cars (79 Coaches, 21 Cab-Coaches) from Nippon Sharyo/Sumitomo to replace its original and secondhand fleet between 2006 and 2017.

Beginning in the 1970s, newer designs for Bi-Level commuter coaches began to be introduced, such as the Canadian BiLevel Coach introduced for GO Transit in 1976. During the expansion of new commuter rail services in North America between the 1990s and 2010s, many newly-established commuter rail agencies opted to go with alternative designs like the Canadian BiLevel Coach rather than the Gallery Car design (Including operators such as Tri-Rail, Metrolink, and Trinity Railway Express). In the Northeastern United States, Commuter Rail Agencies instead opted for custom designs such as the C3, the Bombardier MultiLevel Coach, and designs from Hyundai-Rotem and Kawasaki due to their ability to fit comfortably within the region's tighter clearances.

As early as the late 1990s, some critics began to view the design of the Gallery Car as inadequate and dated. With common complaints stemming from the design's inadequacy to adapt to Accessibility standards for people with Disabilities, High-floor boarding, and what some regarded as tight and cramped spacing. By the late 2010s, with Nippon Sharyo/Sumitomo exiting the railcar manufacturing market in North America due to a failed Intercity Bi-Level Coach design, Metra was not able to find a manufacturer to build new Gallery Cars for their agency as they had initially hoped for.

In 2019, after failed bids for new Gallery Cars, Metra instead opted for a new design for Bi-Level railcars to replace part of their operating fleet, including cars that dated back to as far as 1955. In 2021, Metra officially announced that they would purchase 200 new Coradia Bi-Levels from Alstom, with an option to purchase 300 more. In May of 2021, Virginia Railway Express opted to join in on Metra's order, with them opting to purchase 21 new Bi-Levels, with an option for 48 more. Metra expects their fleet to go into service beginning in 2027.

Caltrain, which had plans to electrify their corridor between San Jose and San Francisco, opted to acquire new Bi-Level Stadler KISS EMUs from Stadler Rail, which were pressed into service when Calmod was completed by the summer of 2024. This led Caltrain to retire most of their locomotive-hauled coaches, including all of their Nippon Sharyo-built Gallery Cars, the vast majority of which were shipped off to Peru to be used for a planned Commuter Service between Lima and Chosica.

== Original Operators ==
Listed are the Original Operators for all Gallery Cars built between 1950 and 2020, excluding the Highliner EMUs:

Numbers	Type	Original Operator	Builder	Years	Notes
700-729	Coach	CB&Q	Budd Company	1950-51	Inherited by Burlington Northern, later Metra. Retired by the mid-2000s. Most sold to Federated Railways Leasing. Leased to MiTrain and WALLY. 5 cars sold to WeGo Star. #702 and #709 preserved at the Illinois Railway Museum.
730-739	Coach	CB&Q	Budd Company	1953	Inherited by Burlington Northern, later Metra. Retired by mid-2000s. Most sold to Federated Railways Leasing. Leased to MiTrain and WALLY. 1 car sold to WeGo Star.
740-749	Coach	CB&Q	Budd Company	1955	Inherited by Burlington Northern, later Metra. Most still in service with Metra as of November 2026.
750-759	Coach	CB&Q	Budd Company	1957	Inherited by Burlington Northern, later Metra. Most still in service with Metra as of November 2026. #752 sold to Federated Railways Leasing. #752 Leased to MiTrain and WALLY.
760-787	Coach	CB&Q	Budd Company	1965	Inherited by Burlington Northern, later Metra. Most still in service with Metra as of November 2026.
790-795	Cab-Coach	CB&Q	Budd Company	1965	Inherited by Burlington Northern, later Metra. Retired by the mid-2000s. All sold to Federated Railways Leasing. Leased to MiTrain and WALLY. 2 cars sold to WeGo Star. #791 preserved at the Illinois Railway Museum.
796-815	Cab-Coach	BN/WSMTD	Budd Company	1973	Bought by West Suburban Mass Transit District for Burlington Northern Commuter Service, Inherited by Metra. Most still in service with Metra, though reconfigured to regular coaches. Some retired, 3 cars sold to Federated Railways Leasing.
816-820	Coach	BN/WSMTD	Budd Company	1973	Bought by West Suburban Mass Transit District for Burlington Northern Commuter Service, Inherited by Metra. All still in service with Metra.
7100-7121	Coach	BN/WSMTD	Budd Company	1977-78	Bought by West Suburban Mass Transit District for Burlington Northern Commuter Service, Inherited by Metra. All still in service with Metra.
1-7, 10-16	Coach	C&NW	St. Louis Car Company	1955	Inherited by RTA, later Metra. Renumbered to 7600-7613. Retired by the late 1990s. cars #1 and #6 preserved at the Illinois Railway Museum.
8-9	Club Coach	C&NW	St. Louis Car Company	1955	Inherited by RTA, later Metra. Renumbered to 7900-7901. Retired by the late 1990s.
17-48	Coach	C&NW	Pullman-Standard	1956	Inherited by RTA, later Metra. Renumbered to 7650-7681. Initially retired by the late 1990s. Some units sold to Virginia Railway Express. Some ex-VRE units sold back to Metra. #25 (as Metra 7658) preserved at the Illinois Railway Museum.
700-709	Long-Distance Coach	C&NW	Pullman-Standard	1958	Built for the Flambeau 400 and Peninsula 400 Streamliners. Sold to Amtrak in 1974, Renumbered to 9611-9620. 9611-9614 Converted to Cab-Coaches in the 1980s and renumbered to 9621-9624. All retired by the early 1990s. Various dispositions, some sold to the Alaska Railroad.
6400	Parlor	C&NW	Pullman-Standard	1958	Built for the Flambeau 400 and Peninsula 400 Streamliners. Rebuilt in 1966 as a Commuter Coach, renumbered to 225. Inherited by RTA, later Metra. Renumbered to 7880. Retired in the late 1990s, sold to AMT, resold to private owner. Sitting abandoned in Bensenville, IL as of November 2026.
600	Coach-Parlor	C&NW	Pullman-Standard	1958	Built for the Flambeau 400 and Peninsula 400 Streamliners. Sold to Amtrak in 1974, Renumbered to 9600. Retired by the early 1990s. Sold to the Alaska Railroad, rebuilt into Diner car #452.
903	Coach-Bar-Lounge	C&NW	Pullman-Standard	1958	Built for the Flambeau 400 and Peninsula 400 Streamliners. Sold to Amtrak in 1974, Renumbered to 9601. Retired by the early 1990s. Sold to the Alaska Railroad, rebuilt into Cafe-Lounge car #351.
49-150	Coach	C&NW	Pullman-Standard	1960-61	Inherited by RTA, later Metra. Renumbered to 7700-7801. Initially retired by the mid-2000s. Various dispositions, some sold back to Metra. #65 (as RTA 7716) and #83 preserved at the Illinois Railway Museum.
151-200	Cab-Coach	C&NW	Pullman-Standard	1959-60	Inherited by RTA, later Metra. Renumbered to 8700-8749. Initially retired by the mid-2000s. Various dispositions, some sold back to Metra and reconfigured to regular coaches. #151 preserved at the Illinois Railway Museum.
201-224	Coach	C&NW	Pullman-Standard	1963-66	Inherited by RTA, later Metra. Renumbered to 7802-7825. Initially retired by the mid-2000s. Various dispositions, some sold back to Metra.
226-237	Coach	C&NW	Pullman-Standard	1967	Inherited by RTA, later Metra. Renumbered to 7826-7837. Initially retired by the mid-2000s. Various dispositions, 7836 sold back to Metra.
251-264	Cab-Coach	C&NW	Pullman-Standard	1965-68	Inherited by RTA, later Metra. Renumbered to 8750-8763. Retired by the mid-2000s, Various dispositions.
301-329	Coach	C&NW	Pullman-Standard	1968-70	Inherited by RTA, later Metra. Renumbered to 7838-7866. Initially retired by the mid-2000s. Various dispositions, some sold back to Metra.
300-341	Coach	Milwaukee Road	Budd Company	1961-64	Inherited by RTA, later Metra. Renumbered to 7200-7241. Most still in service with Metra as of November 2026.
380-399	Cab-Coach	Milwaukee Road	Budd Company	1961-64	Inherited by RTA, later Metra. Renumbered to 8200-8219. Most still in service with Metra as of November 2026. No longer being used as Cab Cars.
342-365	Coach	Milwaukee Road/NWSMTD	Budd Company	1974	Bought by Northwest Suburban Mass Transit District for the Milwaukee Road Suburban Service West Line. Inherited by RTA, later Metra. Renumbered to 7257-7280. Most still in service with Metra as of November 2026.
366-368	Coach	Milwaukee Road/NSMTD (Nortran)	Budd Company	1974	Bought by North Suburban Mass Transit District (Nortran) for the Milwaukee Road Suburban Service North Line. Inherited by RTA, later Metra. Renumbered to 7281-7283. Still in service with Metra as of November 2026.
400-411	Cab-Coach	Milwaukee Road/NWSMTD	Budd Company	1974	Bought by Northwest Suburban Mass Transit District for the Milwaukee Road Suburban Service West Line. Inherited by RTA, later Metra. Renumbered to 8225-8236. Still in service with Metra as of November 2026. No longer being used as Cab Cars.
412-413	Cab-Coach	Milwaukee Road/NSMTD (Nortran)	Budd Company	1974	Bought by North Suburban Mass Transit District (Nortran) for the Milwaukee Road Suburban Service North Line. Inherited by RTA, later Metra. Renumbered to 8237-8238. Still in service with Metra as of November 2026. No longer being used as Cab Cars.
140-154	Coach	CRI&P	Budd Company	1965	Inherited by RTA, later Metra. Renumbered to 7242-7256. Most still in service with Metra as of November 2026.
110-114	Cab-Coach	CRI&P	Budd Company	1965	Inherited by RTA, later Metra. Renumbered to 8220-8224. Most still in service with Metra as of November 2026. No longer being used as Cab Cars.
155-159	Coach	CRI&P	Pullman-Standard	1970	Inherited by RTA, later Metra. Renumbered to 7867-7871. Initially retired by the mid-2000s. Sold to MARC, most sold back to Metra.
115-119	Cab-Coach	CRI&P	Pullman-Standard	1970	Inherited by RTA, later Metra. Renumbered to 7881-7885. Initially retired by the mid-2000s. Sold to MARC, most sold back to Metra and reconfigured to regular coaches.
7284-7381	Coach	RTA	Budd Company	1978-80	Inherited by Metra. Most still in service with Metra as of November 2026.
8239-8275	Cab-Coach	RTA	Budd Company	1978-80	Inherited by Metra. Most still in service with Metra as of November 2026. No longer being used as Cab Cars.
8400-8413	Cab-Coach	Metra	Morrison-Knudsen	1994-95	Most still in service with Metra as of November 2026.
8414-8478	Cab-Coach	Metra	Amerail	1995-98	Took over manufacturing from Morrison-Knudsen. Most still in service with Metra as of November 2026.
7400-7497	Coach	Metra	Amerail	1996-98	Most still in service with Metra as of November 2026.
6001-6194	Coach	Metra	Nippon Sharyo	2002-08	Most still in service with Metra as of November 2026.
8501-8608	Cab-Coach	Metra	Nippon Sharyo	2002-08	Most still in service with Metra as of November 2026.
6201-6207	Coach	Metra	Nippon Sharyo/Sumitomo	2020	Given to Metra as part of a settlement deal.
3700-3709	Coach	Southern Pacific	Pullman-Standard	1955	Retired by 1985. Some acquired by Transcisco Tours, rebuilt into Excursion Cars, 6 sold to BN for use as Business Cars, BN Business Cars now owned by BNSF Railway.
3710-3730	Coach	Southern Pacific	American Car & Foundry	1957	Retired by 1985. Some sold to Transcisco Tours, others to Princess Cruises, and some to Alaska Railroad, all for excursion use. #3714, #3720, and #3722 Preserved at the Golden Gate Railroad Museum.
3731-3745	Coach	Southern Pacific	Pullman-Standard	1968	Retired by 1985. Some sold to Princess Cruises, rebuilt into "Ultra-Dome" cars.
900-901	Cab-Coach	CP Rail	Canadian Vickers	1969-70	Inherited by CTCUM/STCUM, later by AMT. Retired by 2010. #900 Preserved at the Canadian Railway Museum (Exporail). the rest scrapped by 2021.
920-926	Coach	CP Rail	Canadian Vickers	1969-70	Inherited by CTCUM/STCUM, later by AMT. Retired by 2010. #900 Preserved at the Canadian Railway Museum (Exporail). the rest scrapped by 2021.
3800-3851	Coach	Caltrain	Nippon Sharyo	1985-87	Retired in 2024. Most sold to Tren de cercanías Lima-Chosica in Peru. #3819 still in Caltrain's possession.
4000-4020	Cab-Coach	Caltrain	Nippon Sharyo	1985-87	Retired in 2024. Most sold to Tren de cercanías Lima-Chosica in Peru. #4005 still in Caltrain's possession.
3852-3865	Coach	Caltrain	Nippon Sharyo	2000	Retired in 2024. All sold to Tren de cercanías Lima-Chosica in Peru.
4021-4026	Cab-Coach	Caltrain	Nippon Sharyo	2000	Retired in 2024. Most sold to Tren de cercanías Lima-Chosica in Peru. #4021 still in Caltrain's possession.
V710-V730	Cab-Coach	Virginia Railway Express	Nippon Sharyo/Sumitomo	2006-08	Still in service with VRE as of November 2026.
V800-V819, V850-V879	Coach	Virginia Railway Express	Nippon Sharyo/Sumitomo	2007-09	Still in service with VRE as of November 2026.
V820-V848	Coach	Virginia Railway Express	Nippon Sharyo/Sumitomo	2014-17	Still in service with VRE as of November 2026.

== All-Time Operators ==
- Agence Métropolitaine de Transport (AMT) - Inherited ex-CP Rail/STCUM Canadian Vickers-built gallery cars in 1996 (all retired by 2010)
- Amtrak - Acquired twelve long-distance "400" cars from the Chicago and North Western Railway in the 1970s; ten coaches and two food-service cars. Amtrak converted four of coaches into control cars in 1981–1982. All twelve were off the roster by 1994.
- Burlington Northern - Inherited the CB&Q's fleet of gallery cars, built new ones between 1973-78. Operations assumed by Metra and BNSF Railway.
- Burlington Northern and Santa Fe - acquired the six Transcisco Tours gallery cars and converted them to be used as business cars (BNSF #40–45); two were later converted to track geometry cars. Operator of some Gallery Cars inherited from BN on the BNSF Line.
- Caltrain - Operated with a fleet of Gallery Cars from the initiation of service until Electrification between San Jose and San Francisco was completed in 2024. Most of the fleet since sold to Tren de cercanías Lima-Chosica in Peru.
- Canadian Pacific Railway - Introduced Gallery Cars built by Canadian Vickers in 1969-70. Montreal passenger route and gallery car fleet transferred to STCUM by 1982, and then to AMT by 1996.
- Chicago and North Western - Introduced Gallery Cars beginning in 1955, including 13 cars for Long-Distance service on the Flambeau 400 and Peninsula 400 Streamliners in 1958. Commuter Cars later inherited by RTA/Metra and Long-Distance Cars sold to Amtrak.
- Chicago, Burlington, & Quincy - First to introduce the Gallery Car design in 1950. Fleet inherited by Burlington Northern/Metra
- Chicago, Rock Island, & Pacific - Ordered Gallery Cars from Budd in 1965 and from Pullman-Standard in 1970. Fleet inherited by RTA/Metra.
- CTCUM/STCUM - Assumed operations of Montreal-area commuter rail services in 1982, including inheriting CP Rail's fleet of Canadian Vickers Gallery Cars. Services passed on to AMT by 1996.
- Foxville and Northern - shortline operator in North Carolina. Owns 7 former VRE (ex-C&NW/Metra) cars. Leased to other operations for various events.
- Federated Railways Leasing (FRYX) - Acquired Ex-CB&Q/BN/Metra Budd Gallery Cars by 2006. Many were planned to be used for MiTrain and WALLY commuter services in Michigan, which never came to fruition.
- GO Transit - borrowed both CP Rail and Chicago and North Western cars for trial runs in 1976.
- MARC Train - Acquired 12 Ex-Metra Gallery Car coaches, often used on the Brunswick Line; fleet replaced by Bombardier MARC IV in early 2015 and returned to Metra.
- Metra - Inherited Commuter operations from Private Railroads and RTA in 1984. Owns the largest operating fleet of Gallery Cars.
- Milwaukee Road - Ordered Gallery Cars from Budd beginning in 1961. Fleet inherited by RTA/Metra.
- Regional Transportation Authority - Assumed Operations of Commuter Services in Chicagoland by the 1970s. Ordered new Gallery Cars from Budd during that decade. Operations passed on to the newly-formed Metra division by 1984.
- Southern Pacific - Operated the Peninsula Commute service between San Jose and San Francisco, Operated 46 gallery cars (SP 3700–3745) beginning in 1955 until their retirement in 1985. Peninsula Commute operations then passed on to Caltrain. Cars sold to Tour Alaska in 1986. Colorado Railcar converted four (SP 3734, 3740, 3744, 3745) into "Ultra Dome" cars at Tillamook, Oregon. Six sold to Transcisco Tours (SP 3700–3703; 3707, 3708), subsequently acquired by BNSF.
- Transcisco Tours - acquired six cars from SP and converted them for tour use (#800532–800537).
- Tren de cercanías Lima-Chosica - Plans to operate commuter service with 90 ex-Caltrain Gallery Cars.
- Utah Transit Authority FrontRunner - Acquired ex-C&NW/Metra cars for parts.
- Virginia Railway Express - Operated 50 ex-C&NW/Metra gallery cars from 2001 until replacement by new Nippon Sharyo gallery cars from 2006 to 2017.
- Steam Railroading Institute - Ex-Metra gallery cars intended for the proposed MiTrain and WALLY Commuter Rail services in storage and occasional excursion use.
- WeGo Star (Formerly Music City Star) - operates eight ex-CB&Q/Metra gallery cars. Originally ran with seven ex-C&NW/Metra gallery cars from initiation of service in 2006 until the early 2020s.

== Current owners ==
Owner	Numbers	Type	Heritage	Year built	Builder	Disposition
Metra	740–787	Coach	Burlington Route, Burlington Northern	1955–65	Budd	Operating – rebuilt in 1973.
Metra	796–815	Cab-Coach	Burlington Northern	1973	Budd	Operating – some have been converted to coaches.
Metra	816-820	Coach	Burlington Northern	1973	Budd	Operating
Metra	6001–6194	Coach	Metra	2002–08	Nippon Sharyo	Operating
Metra	6201-6207	Coach	Metra	2020	Sumitomo/Nippon Sharyo	Operating
Metra	7100–7121	Coach	Burlington Northern	1978	Budd	Operating
Metra	7200-7241, 7257–7283	Coach	Milwaukee Road, RTA	1961–74	Budd	Operating
Metra	7242-7256	Coach	Rock Island, RTA	1965	Budd	Operating
Metra	7284-7381	Coach	RTA	1978-80	Budd	Operating
Metra	7400–7497	Coach	Metra	1996–98	Amerail	Operating, rebuilt in 2012
Metra	7650–7681	Coach	Chicago & North Western, RTA	1956	Pullman-Standard	Operating, most retired, some reacquired from VRE – #7658 preserved at the Illinois Railway Museum
Metra	7700–7866	Coach	Chicago & North Western, RTA	1960–70	Pullman-Standard	Operating, many retired. 12 coaches sold to MARC and later reacquired by 2015 #7716 (As RTA #7716) & #7734 (As C&NW #83) preserved at the Illinois Railway Museum
Metra	7867–7871	Coach	Rock Island, RTA	1970	Pullman-Standard	Operating, Initially retired, some reacquired. 7869 now a bike car.
Metra	7881–7885	Cab-Coach	Rock Island, RTA	1970	Pullman-Standard	Operating, Initially retired, some reacquired and converted to coaches.
Metra	8200–8219, 8225-8238	Cab-Coach	Milwaukee Road, RTA	1961–74	Budd	Operating – some have been converted to coaches.
Metra	8220-8224	Cab-Coach	Rock Island, RTA	1965	Budd	Operating – some have been converted to coaches.
Metra	8239–8275	Cab-Coach	RTA	1978–80	Budd	Operating – some have been converted to coaches.
Metra	8400–8478	Cab-Coach	Metra	1994–98	Morrison-Knudsen/Amerail	Operating – mainly assigned to the UP lines.
Metra	8501–8608	Cab-Coach	Metra	2002–08	Nippon Sharyo	Operating
Metra	8700–8763	Cab-Coach	Chicago and North Western, RTA	1959–68	Pullman-Standard	Operating, most retired, some reacquired and converted to coaches. – #8700 (As C&NW #151) preserved at the Illinois Railway Museum; 8749 is a bicycle car.
VRE	710–730	Cab-Coach	VRE	2006–08	Sumitomo/Nippon Sharyo	Operating
VRE	800–819, 850–869, 870–879	Coach	VRE	2007-09	Sumitomo/Nippon Sharyo	Operating
VRE	820–848^{†}	Coach	VRE	2014	Sumitomo/Nippon Sharyo	Operating
WeGo Star	790, 795	Cab-Coach	Burlington Route, Burlington Northern, Metra, MiTrain	1965	Budd	Operating, previous Ex-Metra Exx-C&NW Pullman-Standard cars retired.
WeGo Star	701, 708, 712, 719, 723, 733	Coach	Burlington Route, Burlington Northern, Metra, MiTrain	1950-1953	Budd	Operating, previous Ex-Metra Exx-C&NW Pullman-Standard cars retired.
BNSF	40-45	Track Inspection Car/Business Car	Southern Pacific, Transcisco Tours	1955	Pullman	Operating
Tren de cercanías Lima-Chosica	3800-3818, 3820-3825	Trailer-Luggage	Caltrain	1985-87	Nippon Sharyo	Testing and construction of the new service
Tren de cercanías Lima-Chosica	3826-3835	Trailer-Bike	Caltrain	1985-87	Nippon Sharyo	Testing and construction of the new service
Tren de cercanías Lima-Chosica	3836-3841	Trailer	Caltrain	1985-87	Nippon Sharyo	Testing and construction of the new service
Tren de cercanías Lima-Chosica	3842-3851	Trailer	Caltrain	1985-87	Nippon Sharyo	Testing and construction of the new service
Tren de cercanías Lima-Chosica	3852-3865	Trailer	Caltrain	2000	Nippon Sharyo	Testing and construction of the new service
Tren de cercanías Lima-Chosica	4000-4004, 4006-4020	Cab-Bike	Caltrain	1985-87	Nippon Sharyo	Testing and construction of the new service
Tren de cercanías Lima-Chosica	4022-4026	Cab-Bike	Caltrain	2000	Nippon Sharyo	Testing and construction of the new service
Caltrain	3819	Trailer-Luggage	Caltrain	1985	Nippon Sharyo	Retired from service in 2024. Being held for preservation?
Caltrain	4005	Cab-Bike	Caltrain	1985	Nippon Sharyo	Retired from service in 2024. Being held for preservation?
Caltrain	4021	Cab-Bike	Caltrain	2000	Nippon Sharyo	Retired from service in 2024. Being held for preservation?

† Eight cars ordered in February 2012 with options for 42 more. As of 2018, 21 further cars had been procured from these options.

== EMU current owners ==
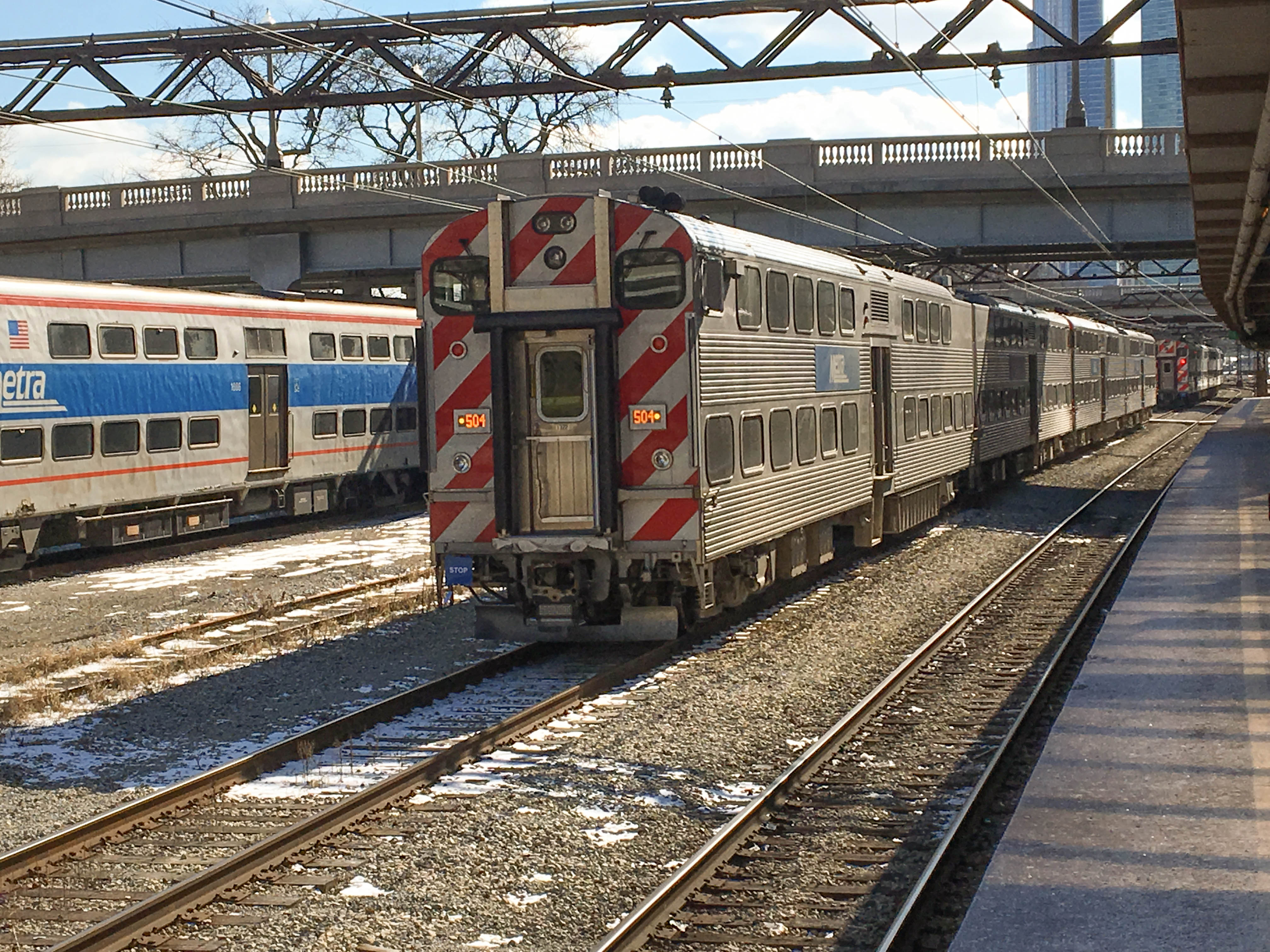
Metra Highliner IIs, with the retired original Highliners in the background

Owner	Numbers	Type	Heritage	Year built	Builder	Status
Metra	1201–1226	MU Coach	Metra	2005	Nippon Sharyo	Operating
Metra	1227–1238	MU Coach	Metra	2012	Sumitomo Group	Operating
Metra	1239–1279	MU Coach	Metra	2013	Sumitomo Group	Operating
Metra	1280-1386	MU Coach	Metra	2014-2016	Sumitomo Group	Operating
Metra	1501–1630	MU Coach	Illinois Central, Illinois Central Gulf, RTA	1971–1972	St. Louis	Retired
Metra	1631–1666	MU Coach	Illinois Central, Illinois Central Gulf, RTA	1978–1979	Bombardier	Retired
South Shore Line	301-314	MU Coach	South Shore Line	2009	Nippon Sharyo	Operating

== Preserved cars ==
- As of November 2026, a total of 9 Gallery Cars (7 Coaches, 2 Cab Cars) are preserved at the Illinois Railway Museum.
  - Chicago & North Western Coach #1 (Later RTA/Metra #7600)
  - Chicago & North Western Coach #6 (Later RTA/Metra #7605)
  - Metra Coach #7658 (Originally C&NW #25)
  - Regional Transportation Authority Coach #7716 (Originally C&NW #65)
  - Chicago & North Western Coach #83 (Later RTA/Metra #7734)
  - Chicago & North Western Cab-Coach #151 (Later RTA/Metra #8700)
  - MiTrain Coaches #702, #709 & Cab-Coach #791 (Ex-Metra, Exx-Burlington Northern, Exxx-Chicago Burlington & Quincy, of the same road numbers.)
- Ex-Agence metropolitaine de transport (Exx-Canadian Pacific) Cab-Coach #900 is on display at the Canadian Railway Museum in Saint-Constant, Quebec.
- Southern Pacific Peninsula Commute Coaches #3714, #3720, & #3722 are preserved at the Golden Gate Railroad Museum in Schellville, California
- C&NW/RTA/Metra Coaches #7667, #7670, #7678, & #7680 and Cab-Coaches #8723 & #8726 are preserved at the Gold Coast Railroad Museum in Miami, Florida in operable condition.
- Ex-Metra Cab-Coach #8758 is stored at the Pacific Southwest Railway Museum in Campo, California, with CZRY reporting marks.
- C&NW Coach #32 is preserved at the National Railroad Museum in Green Bay, Wisconsin
- C&NW Coaches #59 and #64 (as RTA #7715) are preserved at the Heart of Dixie Railroad Museum in Calera, Alabama
- C&NW Coach #2 is displayed behind SL-SF 4-8-4 #4524 at Grant Beach Park in Springfield, Missouri.
- The Baja California Railroad also makes use of some gallery cars on the Tijuana-Tecate Tourist Train.
- Others serve on heritage railroads like the North Shore Scenic Railroad, which has 4 C&NW cars (#51, #130, #222, & #321), all of which are in the original C&NW paint scheme. Numerous others survive, but many are still in operation on operators like Metra.

== Future ==
As of the 2020s, most gallery cars are beginning to be phased out. In 2010, Agence Métropolitaine de Transport (AMT), the successor to private commuter operations in the Montréal area, retired its 1969-1970 Canadian Vickers gallery cars, with 8 of the 9 built scrapped in 2021, except for #900. Caltrain retired its gallery cars in 2024, replacing them with bilevel electric multiple units as part of its Calmod electrification project, with most of its Nippon Sharyo gallery cars being sold off to Peru for the Tren de cercanías Lima-Chosica Commuter Service. As of November 2026, Metra expects the oldest gallery cars still in service on their roster to be replaced with Alstom Coradia bilevel coaches starting in 2027.

== Gallery ==
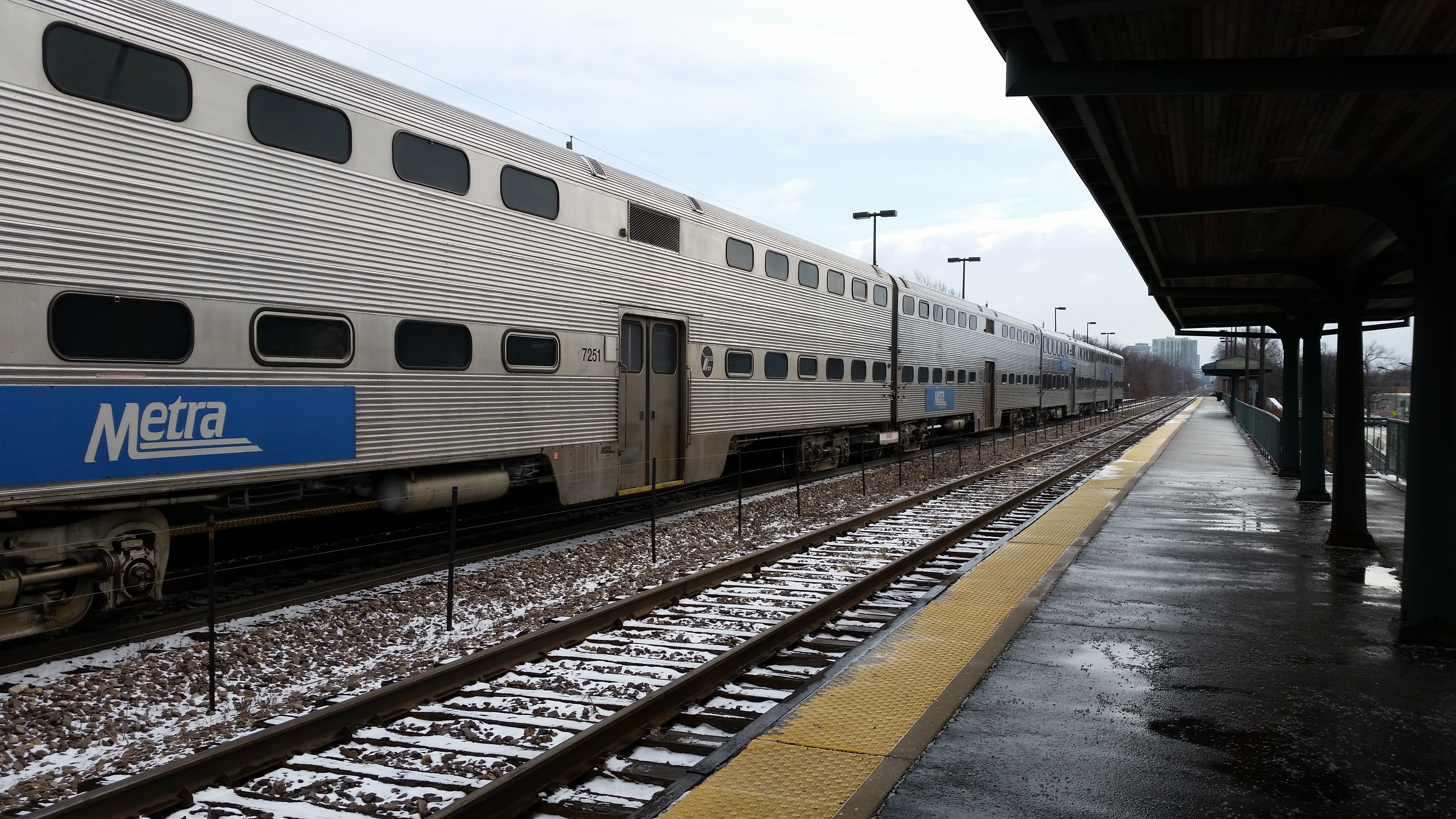
A Metra train of Gallery Cars, with the closest two cars being Budd cars, the second car from the rear being from Nippon Sharyo, and the rearmost car being from Amerail.

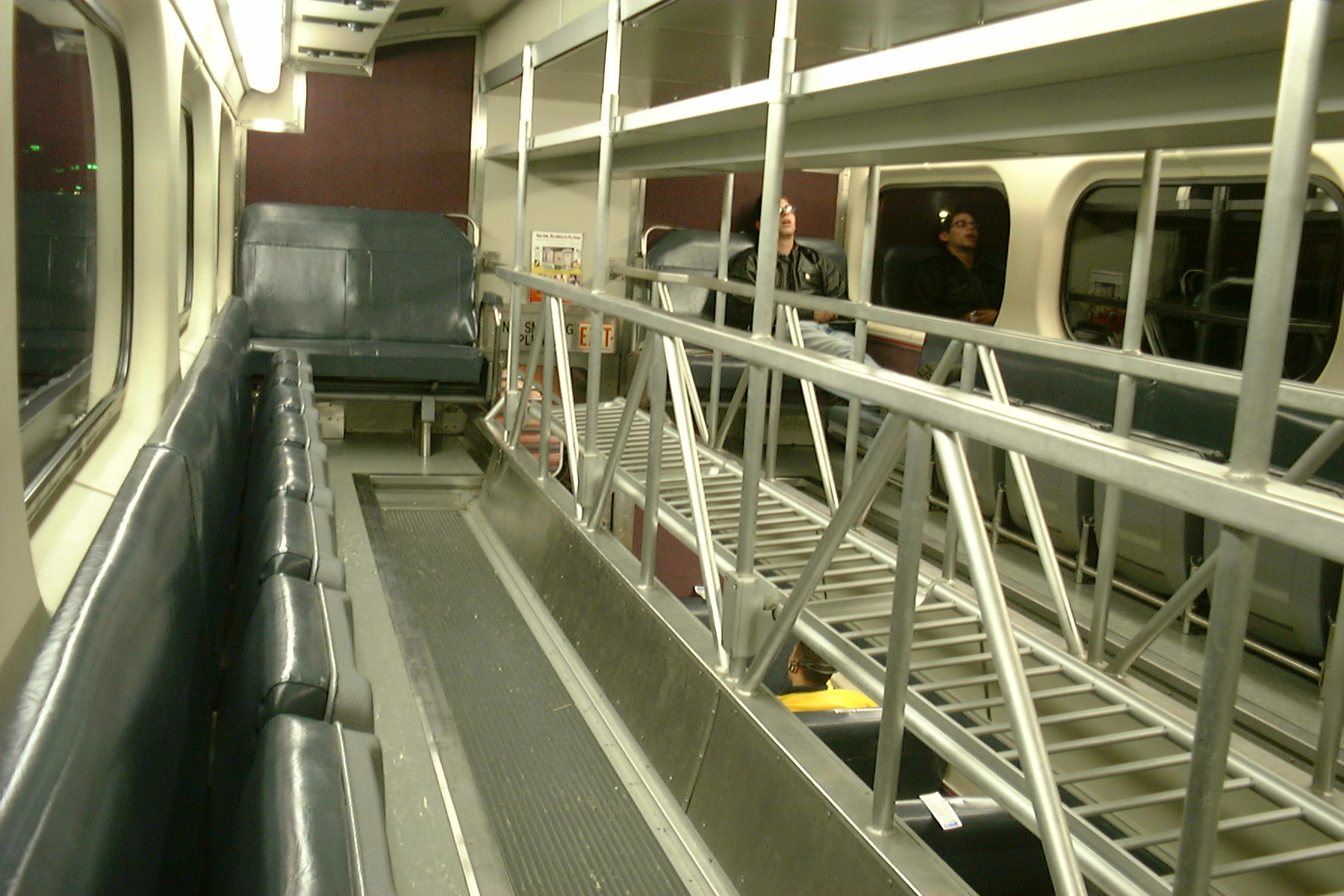
The upper level of a Metra gallery car. Usually, there is a rack in the dropdown for baggage.

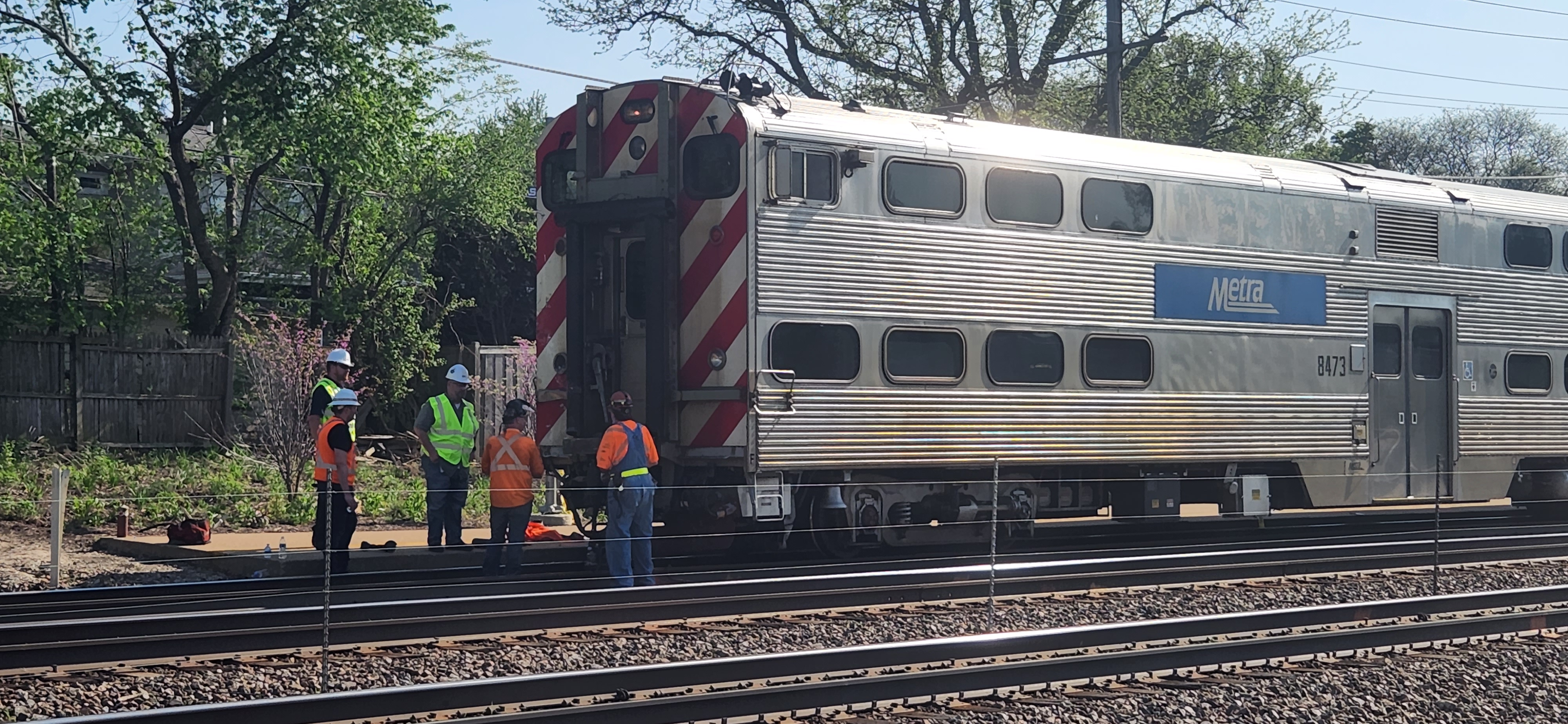
Metra Cab Car No. 8473 having its plow cut off after an accident near Clarendon Hills station in Clarendon Hills, IL in May 2022.

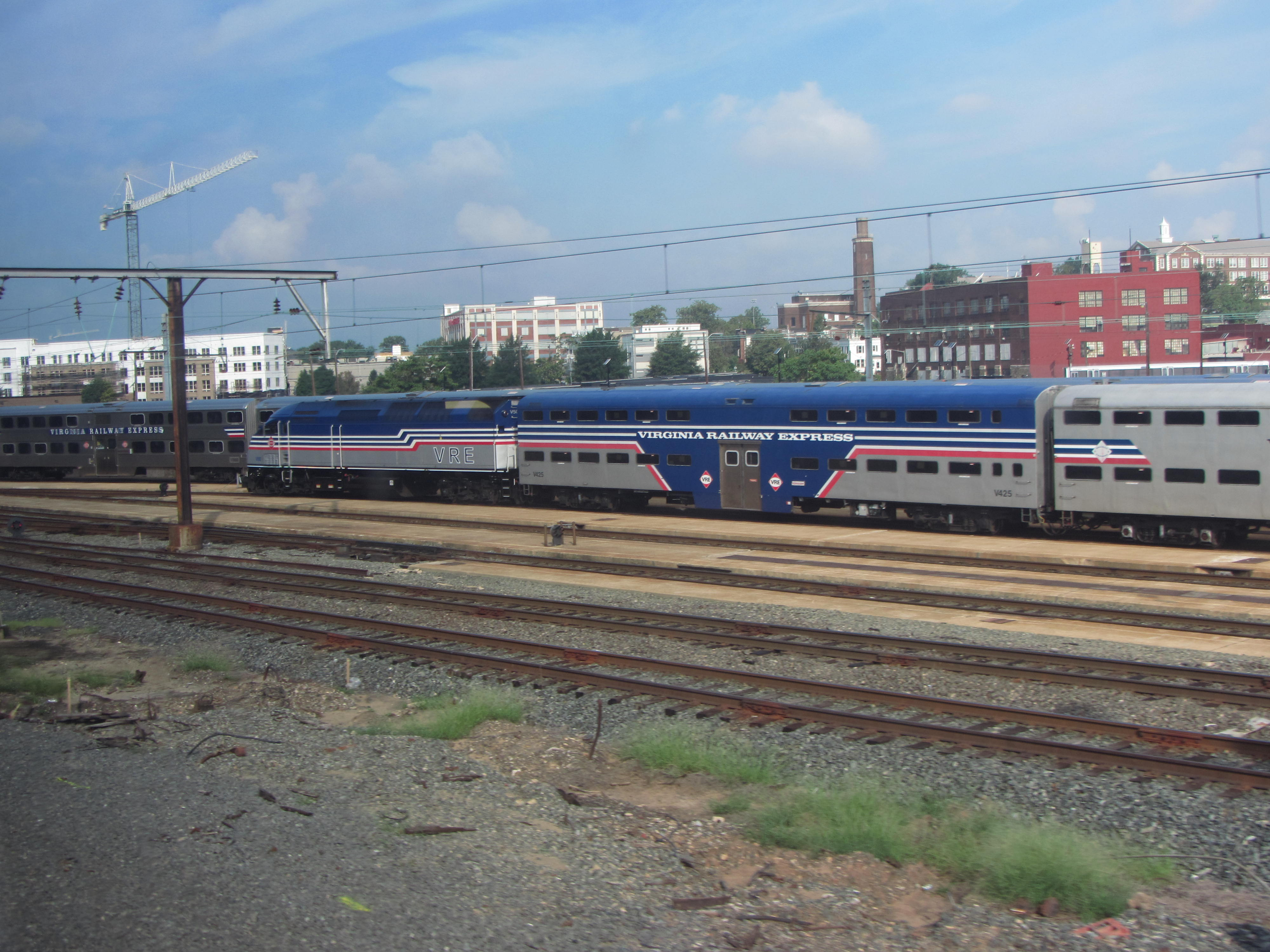
Virginia Railway Express No. V425. Originally in service with the C&NW, since retired.

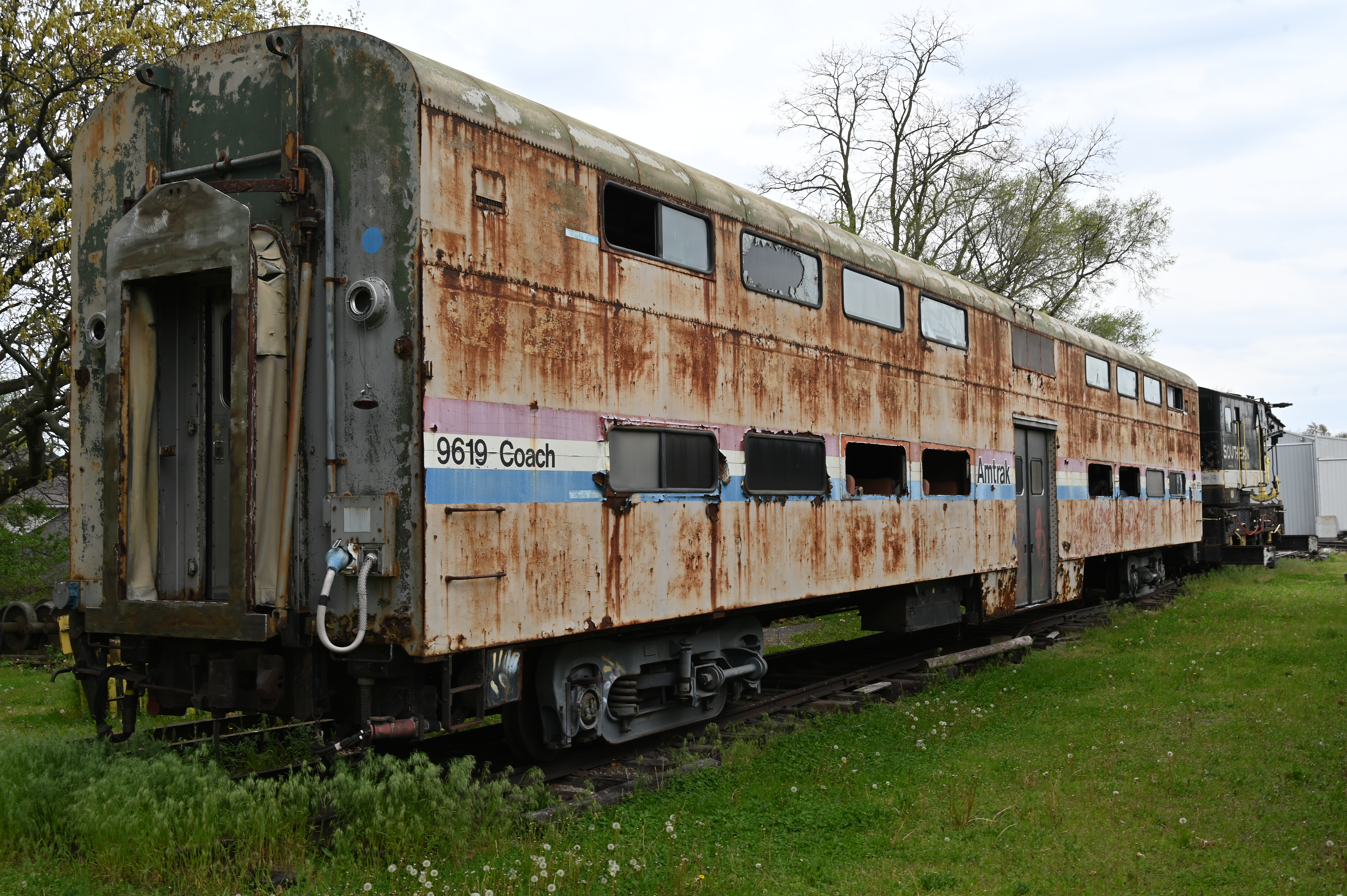
Ex-C&NW Amtrak coach No. 9619 sitting in rough condition in Bellevue, Ohio

Chicago & North Western Gallery Cars leading a train inbound towards Chicago in Elmhurst, IL in January 1979.

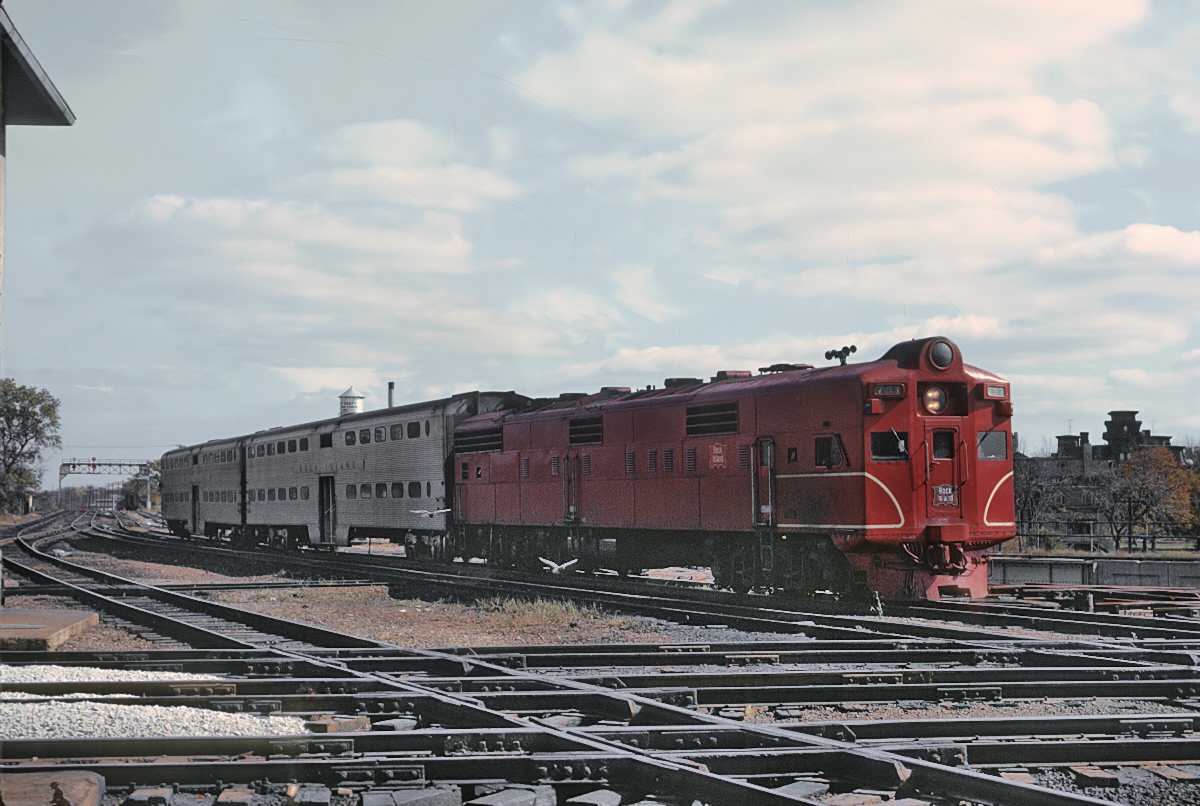
Rock Island 751 leading an outbound train with a pair of Budd-built Gallery Cars into Joliet Union Station in Joliet, IL in October 1966.

Southern Pacific Pullman-Standard Gallery Car 3702 at the Third & Townsend Depot in San Francisco, CA in August 1967

Budd-Built Gallery Cars in service on the Burlington Northern Line (Now the BNSF Line) in Naperville, IL in April 1988.

Nippon Sharyo-Built Gallery Cars operating on a Virginia Railway Express train in Washington D.C. in June 2024.

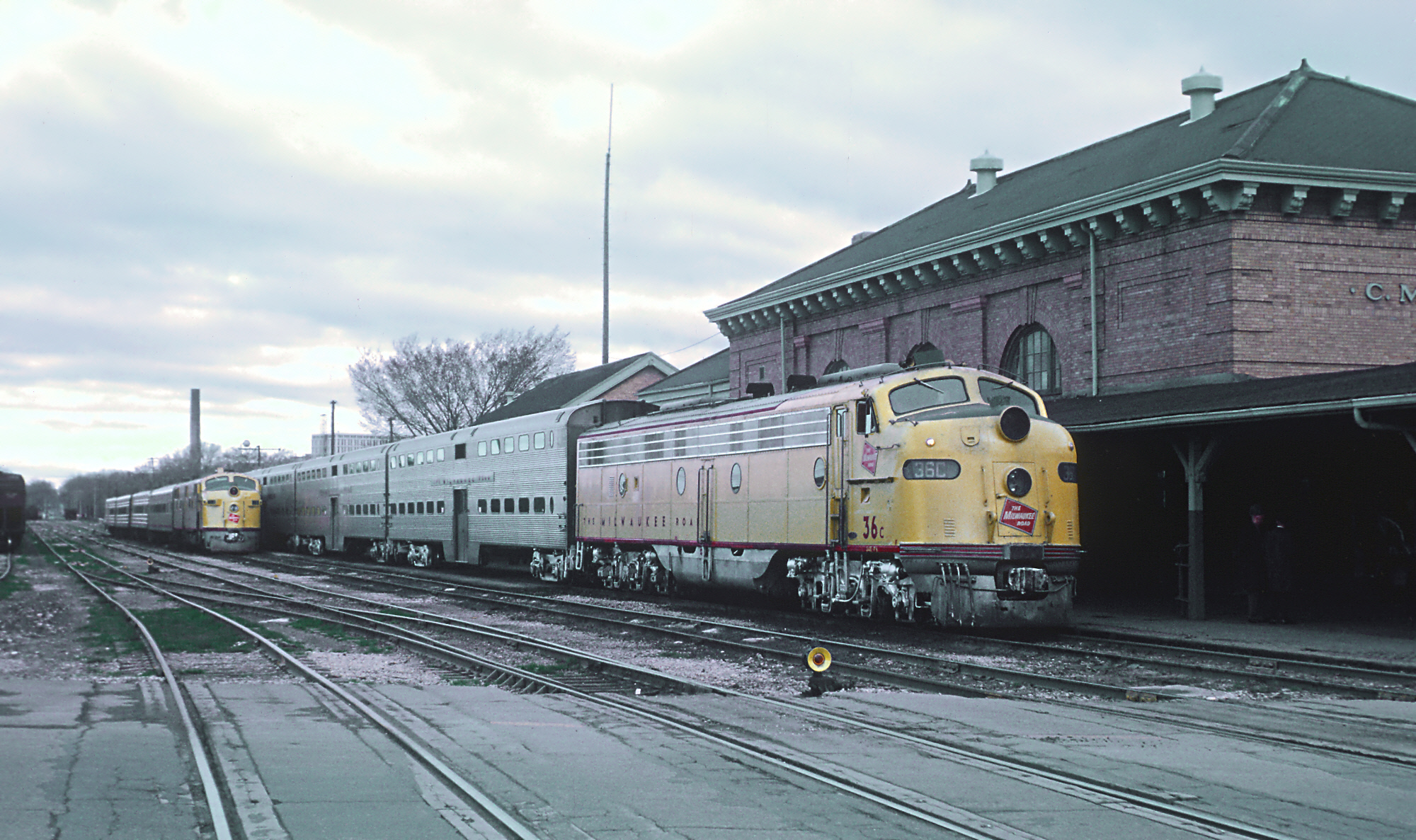
Milwaukee Road 36C leading a Special train with a set of Budd-built Gallery Cars through Madison, WI in May 1967.

A pair of CP Rail Canadian Vickers Gallery Cars being led by Cab Car 901 on an outbound "TownTrain" commuter train from Montreal through Sainte-Anne-de-Bellevue, QC in March 1980.

A string of Caltrain Gallery Cars built by Nippon Sharyo stopped at the Broadway Station in Burlingame, CA in August 2010

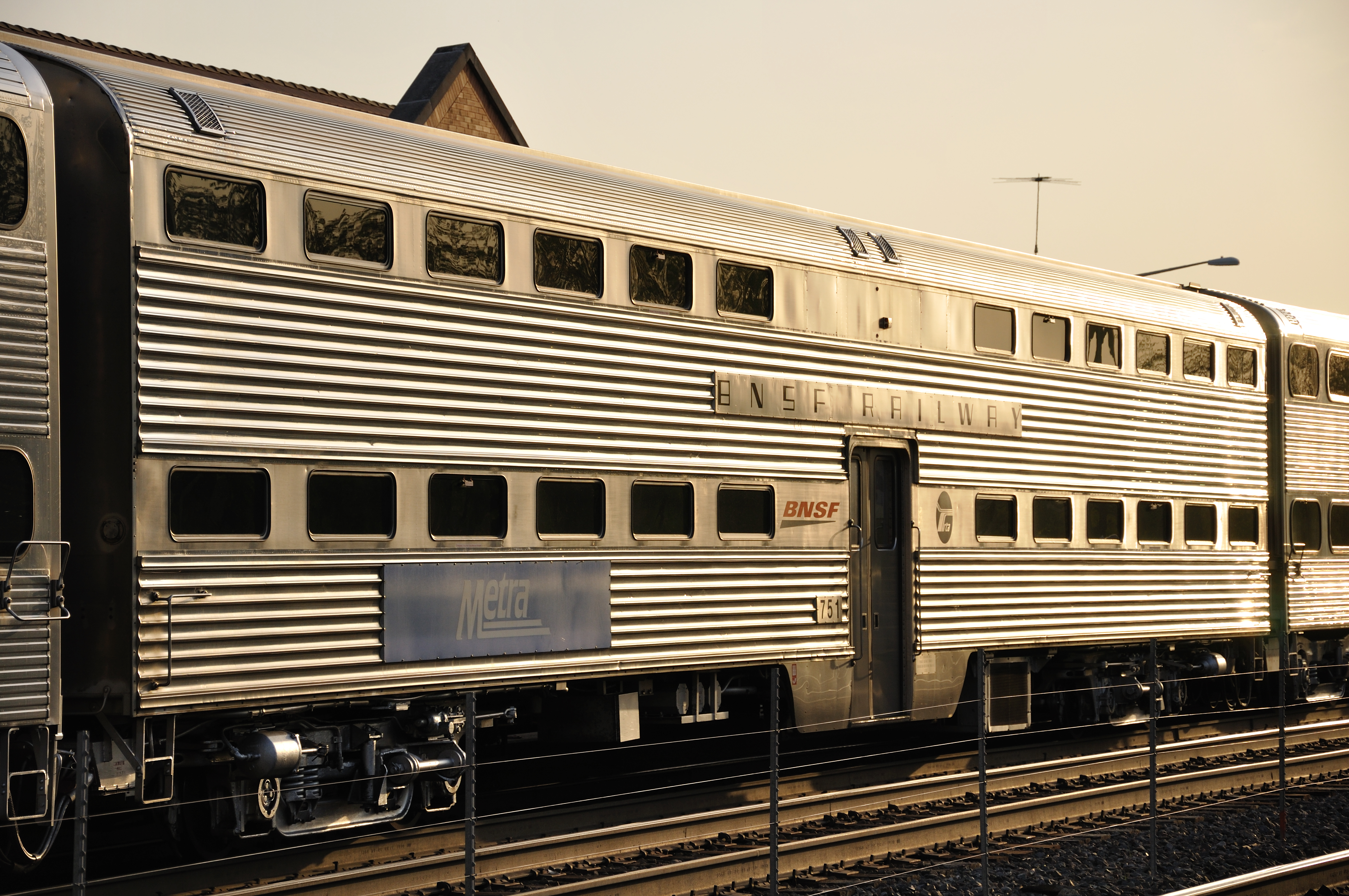
Metra/BNSF Gallery Car 751, built by Budd for the Chicago, Burlington & Quincy in 1957, seen in service on the BNSF Line.

== See also ==
- Bombardier Bi-Level Coach
- Hi-Level
