= Transcisco Tours =

Railway between California and Nevada

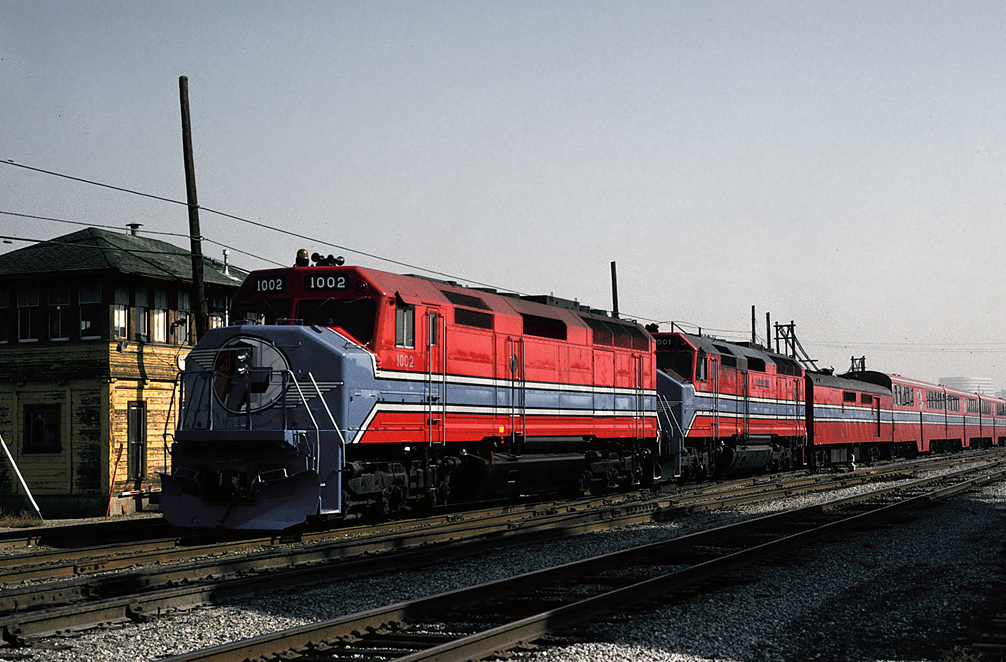
- MCHX 1002 and 1001 at College Park in February 1991.

Overview
- Headquarters: San Francisco
- Reporting mark: MCHX
- Locale: California, Nevada and Texas
- Dates of operation: 1990–1991

Technical
- Track gauge: 4 ft 8 1/2 in (1,435 mm) standard gauge

Transcisco Tours (reporting mark MCHX) was an excursion railroad offering service between San Jose, California and Reno, Nevada on the twice-a-week Sierra 49er Express train. Parent company, Transcisco Industries, was also responsible for operating The Texan dinner train near San Antonio under a subsidiary company, the Transcisco Texas Railway.

== History ==
=== Transcisco Industries ===
Transcisco Industries was founded in 1972 by Mark Hungerford to lease and manage rail cars; in the early 1980s it was split into two publicly traded firms: Transcisco and PLM International. In 1990, Transcisco began passenger operations with three announcements: first, a new contract with Amtrak to operate luxury train service between the San Francisco Bay Area and Reno, Nevada; second, that it was negotiating with Amtrak for similar service between Los Angeles and Las Vegas; and third, that it was acquiring a dinner train in San Antonio. However, passenger service proved to be unprofitable, and Transcisco would file for bankruptcy in July 1991.

The company emerged from bankruptcy in September 1993 and in 1995 announced a contract to maintain rail cars leased to Burlington Northern and Southern Pacific. In addition, the company owned a substantial stake in the Russian firm SFAT (SovFinAmTrans, short for Soviet-Finnish-American Transportation Company), a rail transportation service provider.

In April 1995, Johnstown America Industries, a railcar manufacturer, made an unsolicited takeover offer of first $1.50, then $1.75 per share (approximately $9 million total). Although Johnstown's second offer was higher than the value of the stock and Hungerford supported it, Transcisco rejected the buyout offer in late May 1995. One year later, in May 1996, Transcisco accepted a buyout offer of $6.50 per share (approximately $46 million) from Trinity Rail Management, which also assumed control of the MCHX reporting mark.

=== Sierra 49er Express train ===
The Sierra 49er Express started from San Jose and offered stops in Oakland, Richmond, Martinez, Sacramento, and Truckee, with connecting van service to Lake Tahoe and Reno. Trains departed from San Jose on Mondays and Fridays, returning on Wednesday and Sunday, respectively. The cost of the ticket depended on the hotel selected for the stay. In 1990, ticket prices, including the two-night hotel stay, ranged from US$289 (equivalent to $700 in 2024) to US$439 (equivalent to $1,060 in 2024) for passage in the dome car, or travelers could opt to return on a later train to extend their stay to five or six nights at additional cost. Total trip time was seven hours for a 280-mile (450 km) ride.

Onboard, passengers could dine and dance (in the Club High Sierra, a converted Pullman Gallery Car which had previously been used on the Southern Pacific Peninsula Commute service between San Jose and San Francisco) or experience live entertainment, including strolling bards playing guitars while dressed as vintage train engineers. The service was called a "cruise train" and was meant to appeal to travelers seeking fun on the journey as well as retirees. Amtrak employees handled train operations, while Transcisco employees provided on-board customer service. Transcisco stated that it would need 50,000 riders per year to continue service.

The Sierra 49er Express started service on December 7, 1990 with a reported 18,000 advance ticket sales. Although the service filled the void left by the Reno Fun Train, which had operated for two decades had been canceled recently, the Sierra 49er Express did not attract the ridership it needed to break even and the service was quickly withdrawn; the last train ran on April 29, 1991. Transcisco Tours reported losses of US$13,839,000 (equivalent to $31,950,000 in 2024) in 1991 and US$3,500,000 (equivalent to $7,840,000 in 2024) in 1992 during the Chapter 11 reorganization proceedings, and paid US$1,500,000 (equivalent to $3,270,000 in 2024) to Amtrak in August 1993 for early termination of the five-year operating agreement.

=== The Texan dinner train ===
The rolling stock for The Texan were acquired from the Texas Southern dinner train (TXSO).

Washington Central Railway (WCRC) acquired the three locomotives and eight cars that were used for The Texan and announced plans to run a three-hour dinner train along Burlington Northern right-of-way between Montgomery, Illinois and Ottawa, Illinois. BC Rail (BCOL) would later acquire the eight coaches and used them for the Pacific Starlight Dinner Train, adding two more (one Super Dome, ex-MILW 57 and one auxiliary power unit) which ran between 1997 and 2002. In 2004, the entire ten-car consist was sold to Ontario Northland (ONTC) for CA$800,000 (equivalent to $1,200,000 in 2023) and entered service on the Polar Bear Express. The cars were planned for refurbishment in 2012, but due to the presence of asbestos, the cars were sold instead.

== Rolling stock ==
=== Locomotives ===
Diesel locomotives of Transcisco Tours
Builder	Model	Locomotive Numbers	Years of service	Notes	Photograph
EMD	EMD F45	1001	1990–91	Sierra 49er Express service; ex-BN 6627 (1001), 6642 (1002), and 6635 (1003). Ex-BN 6627 was purchased by Doyle McCormack in 1987 and renumbered to DLMX 743. Subsequently sold to WSOR retaining 1001–1003; in service with MRL as 391 (1001), 392 (1002), and 393 (1003).	
EMD	EMD F45	1002	1990–91	Sierra 49er Express service; ex-BN 6627 (1001), 6642 (1002), and 6635 (1003). Ex-BN 6627 was purchased by Doyle McCormack in 1987 and renumbered to DLMX 743. Subsequently sold to WSOR retaining 1001–1003; in service with MRL as 391 (1001), 392 (1002), and 393 (1003).	
EMD	EMD F45	1003	1990–91	Sierra 49er Express service; ex-BN 6627 (1001), 6642 (1002), and 6635 (1003). Ex-BN 6627 was purchased by Doyle McCormack in 1987 and renumbered to DLMX 743. Subsequently sold to WSOR retaining 1001–1003; in service with MRL as 391 (1001), 392 (1002), and 393 (1003).	
EMD	EMD F7A	100	1990–91	"Transcisco Texan" service; ex-BLE 723A (100), 723B (101), and 724A (102). Sold to Spirit of Washington Dinner Train service, later sold to ECDW for use on CZRY.	
EMD	EMD F7B	101	1990–91	"Transcisco Texan" service; ex-BLE 723A (100), 723B (101), and 724A (102). Sold to Spirit of Washington Dinner Train service, later sold to ECDW for use on CZRY.	
EMD	EMD F7A	102	1990–91	"Transcisco Texan" service; ex-BLE 723A (100), 723B (101), and 724A (102). Sold to Spirit of Washington Dinner Train service, later sold to ECDW for use on CZRY.	

Of the three EMD F45 locomotives, the only one equipped with head-end power was 1001.

=== Coaches ===
Coaches of Sierra 49er Express
Builder	Model	Number	Seats	Years of service	Notes	Photograph
Pullman-Standard	Gallery	800532 Club High Sierra	unk.	1990–91	Previously in service (1955–1985) on the SP Peninsula Commute service between San Francisco and San Jose. Rebuilt from SP 3703, later sold to Burlington Northern and rebuilt as BNA 31 Silver Fox business car, later renumbered to BNSF 40 Fox River.	
Pullman-Standard	Gallery	800533 Donner Lake	76	1990–91	Rebuilt from SP 3702, later sold to Burlington Northern and rebuilt as BNA 33 Skagit River business car, later renumbered to BNSF 42. Subsequently rebuilt to track geometry car and renumbered BNSF 87.	
Pullman-Standard	Gallery	800534 Lake Tahoe	76	1990–91	Rebuilt from SP 3701, later sold to Burlington Northern and rebuilt as BNA 32 Flathead River business car, later renumbered to BNSF 41.	
Pullman-Standard	Gallery	800535 Sacramento	76	1990–91	Rebuilt from SP 3700, later sold to Burlington Northern and rebuilt as BNA 39 Rio Grande River business car, later renumbered to BNSF 43. Subsequently rebuilt to track geometry car and renumbered BNSF 80.	
Pullman-Standard	Gallery	800536; San Jose	76	1990–91	Rebuilt from SP 3708, later sold to Burlington Northern and rebuilt as BNA 40 Colorado River business car, later renumbered to BNSF 44.	
Pullman-Standard	Gallery	800537; San Francisco	76	1990–91	Rebuilt from SP 3707, later sold to Burlington Northern and rebuilt as BNA 41 Powder River business car, later renumbered to BNSF 45.	
Pullman-Standard	Gallery	800519–531	unk.	unk.	Recorded as being sold to Transcisco, but current status is unknown. Numbered as follows: 800519 ← SP #3704; 800520 ← SP #3709; 800521 ← SP #3737; 800522 ← SP #3732; 800523 ← SP #3729; 800524 ← SP #3728; 800525 ← SP #3727; 800526 ← SP #3725; 800527 ← SP #3724; 800528 ← SP #3723; 800529 ← SP #3721; 800530 ← SP #3711; 800531 ← SP #3710	
ACF	Astra Dome	800556 Zephyr Cove	unk.	1990–91	Initially built as UP 9009 in 1955; leased from Northern Rail Car and returned after Transcisco's bankruptcy. Currently in service as UP 9009 City of San Francisco.	
Pullman-Standard	Dome diner	800558 Emerald Bay	unk.	1990–91	Initially built as UP 7012 in 1958; leased from Northern Rail Car and returned after Transcisco's bankruptcy. Currently in service as UP 7011 Missouri River Eagle.	
ACF	Cafeteria Lounge	800559 Pine River	unk.	1990–91	Initially built as UP 4003 in 1955; leased from Northern Rail Car and returned after Transcisco's bankruptcy. Currently in service as UP 4003 Pacific Limited.	
ACF	Astra Dome	800560 Crystal Bay	unk.	1990–91	Initially built as UP 8003 in 1955; leased from Northern Rail Car and returned after Transcisco's bankruptcy. Currently in service as UP 8004 Colorado Eagle.	

The ex-SP gallery cars were modified by raising the lower level floor by 3 feet (0.91 m) to create a baggage storage space, and windows were enlarged to 5 by 4 feet (1.5 by 1.2 m); passenger capacity was reduced from 145 (in Commute service) to 76 per car. As part of the bankruptcy filing, Transcisco Tours and Transcisco Texas Railways both liquidated their rolling stock by February 1993.

Coaches of The Texan
Builder	Model	Number	Seats	Years of service	Notes	Photograph
Budd (1941)	Bar/ lounge		48	1990-91	ex-ATSF 1389, built for El Capitan; retired in 1968 and sold to Champlin Realty. After Texan service, purchased by BC Rail (renumbered 157 "Continental", 1997–2002) and then by Ontario Northland (2004, renumbered to 905). Has since operated on annual "Santa Train" with restored ATSF 1389 numbering for Indiana Rail Road.	
Budd (1947)	Dinner table		68	1990-91	ex-New York Central 406; after Texan service, sold to BC Rail (1997–2002, #158 "Manhattan") and then to Ontario Northland (2004, #906).	
Pullman-Standard (1950)	Dining		68	1990-91	ex-Illinois Central 4128; after Texan service, sold to BC Rail (1997–2002, #155 "Apollo") and then to Ontario Northland (2004, #904).	
Pullman-Standard (1950)	Kitchen Dormitory		unk.	1990-91	ex-Illinois Central 4128A; after Texan service, sold to BC Rail (1997–2002, #156 "Savoy") and then to Ontario Northland (2004, #907).	
Budd (1937)	Club Lounge/ Dormitory		25	1990-91	ex-ATSF 1371 Nambe for Chief; after Texan service, purchased by BC Rail (1997-2002, #154 "Rainbow") and then by Ontario Northland (2004, #903). Currently in private ownership, leased to and in regular excursion service on Austin Steam Train Association.	
Budd (1949)	Dome lounge		70	1990-91	ex-Western Pacific 812 Silver Feather for California Zephyr; after Transcisco Texan service, purchased by WCRC and renumbered to 151, operated on BC Rail Pacific Starlight Dinner Train as "Moonglow", 1997–2002. Sold in 2004 to Ontario Northland Railway, renumbered 901 for Polar Bear Express; sold to Arkansas & Missouri Railroad in 2010 and renumbered to 108 as "Silver Feather Premium".	
Budd (1946)	Diner		48	1990-91	ex Chesapeake & Ohio Railway 1920 for The Chessie, then Amtrak #8300; after Texan service, sold to BC Rail (1997–2002, #150 "Indigo") and then to Ontario Northland (2004, #908).	
Pullman-Standard (1950)	Dome Club Lounge		63	1990-91	ex-ATSF 500 "Pleasure Dome" for Super Chief; after Transcisco Texan service, purchased by WCRC and renumbered to 152, then to 153, operated on BC Rail Pacific Starlight Dinner Train as "Twilight", 1997–2002. Sold in 2004 to Ontario Northland Railway, renumbered 902 for Polar Bear Express.	
