= WALLY =

Proposed commuter rail service

WALLY (the Washtenaw–Livingston Rail Line) was a commuter rail service proposed in 2008 which would have linked the Michigan cities of Ann Arbor and Howell. It never got past the planning stages.

== Proposal ==
Trains would have run daily over existing trackage owned by the Great Lakes Central Railroad, which also committed to providing ten stainless-steel bi-level passenger cars. The service was proposed as an alternative to adding a third lane to U.S. Highway 23 (US 23), which would cost upwards of $500 million. The Ann Arbor Area Transportation Authority was named the "designated authority" for the project in 2008.

Initial start-up costs were projected at $2.9 million, with annual operating costs at $4.8 million. Backers of the project estimate 884,000 rides per year, 1,300 daily, with a fare revenue of $2.4 million. The remainder would be subsidized by state and local governments. The project has received funding commitments from the Michigan Department of Transportation, the Ann Arbor Downtown Development Authority, and the Northfield Township Downtown Development Authority. Attempts to obtain a $1 million grant from the Federal government fell through. Both the University of Michigan and the Ann Arbor offices of the Environmental Protection Agency would pay the fares of any employees who took the train in lieu of commuting. Backers conducted a $150,000 feasibility study of the line, with money pledged by the University of Michigan, the Great Lakes Central Railroad, the Southeast Michigan Council of Governments (SEMCOG), Washtenaw and Livingston Counties. The study reported back that the project is viable, but placed start-up costs at $32.4 million, much higher than initial estimates. Most of the outlay would be for infrastructure improvements. After three years of service the line would become eligible for federal transportation funding.

In April 2010 supporters announced a scaled-back proposal with start-up costs of $16–20 million, with yearly operating costs of $7.1 million. As of September 2011, $16 million had been spent on capital costs with another projected $19 million required for startup, and operating costs were projected as an annual $5.4 million. In his oral update to the AATA board on January 19, 2012, AATA CEO Michael Ford reported on WALLY, the north-south commuter rail project that would connect Howell and Ann Arbor. Ford stressed that it’s currently not a viable project without the TIGER III funding that it failed to secure.

In October 2014, a new study of the commuter rail service began. Expected to take about 18 months, the study will focus on more detailed operational aspects of the possible service than the 2008 study did. The detailed operational aspects the study will explore include ridership, station and maintenance facility locations, as well as cost and funding. The new study will also examine possible alternatives to rail service, such as bus service and additional highway lanes. The study is funded primarily through a Transportation and Community System Preservation grant, jointly administered by the Federal Highway Administration and the Federal Transit Administration, as well as a 20% match from the Ann Arbor Area Transportation Authority. As of 2020 the project has been indefinitely canceled due to a failed ballot for transit funding.

== Route ==
The proposed end-points of the service are Ann Arbor and Howell. The service will run a total length of 27 miles (43 km). The line is operated by the Great Lakes Central Railroad, a regional railroad who leases the track from CSX, and was originally built by the Lansing, Alma, Mt. Pleasant & Northern and the Toledo, Ann Arbor & North Michigan, forerunners of the Ann Arbor Railroad, between 1885 and 1895. Proposed intermediate stops include Brighton, Hamburg and Whitmore Lake. The stop in Brighton would not be in the downtown but rather at Chilson Road, four miles (6.4 km) to the west, as the railroad line through the downtown is owned by CSX directly and no operating agreement has been reached. Also pending is an arrangement with the Ann Arbor Railroad for service over the last 1.75 miles (2.82 km) into Ann Arbor itself. Trains in Ann Arbor would stop on Plymouth Road near the North Campus of the University of Michigan and would neither cross the Huron River nor interchange directly with Amtrak.

== Leased Cars ==
From 2010 to 2015, the Michigan Department of Transportation refurbished and leased twenty-three 1950s-1960s retired Metra rail cars in anticipation of WALLY, which still had not received any approval or capital or operational funding. Over the five-year period, the passenger rail cars sat unused in a railyard owned by Great Lakes Central Railroad in Owosso, northeast of Lansing. The state paid over $12 million lease the passenger rail cars, spending $7.3 million in refurbishments, $3 million in lease charges, and another $1.1 million for consulting. Public outcry led to the termination of the lease which had continued to cost the state $1.1 million annually. The terms of the new agreement allowed Great Lakes Central to lease the rail cars to other entities, but the cars would be made available upon request to MDOT for the next five years. In addition, 50-70% of the lease or sale revenue from the rail cars would be returned to the state.

== See also ==
- SEMCOG Commuter Rail
