= Bell Centre =

Multi-purpose indoor arena in Montreal, Canada

- Centre Bell (French)

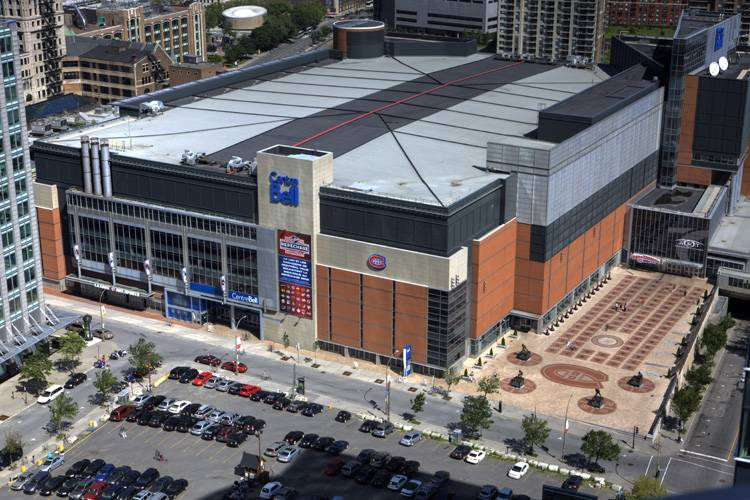
- Bell Centre in 2013

- Location in Montreal Location in Quebec Location in Canada
- Former names: Nouveau forum de Montréal/New Montreal Forum (pre-construction–1996); Centre Molson/Molson Centre (1996–2002)
- Address: 1909 Canadiens-de-Montréal Avenue
- Location: Montreal, Quebec, Canada
- Coordinates: 45°29′46″N 73°34′10″W
- Owner: Groupe CH (Molson family)
- Operator: Evenko
- Capacity: Amphitheatre: 10,000–14,000; Concerts: 15,000–19,200; Ice hockey: 21,273 (1996–2014); 21,287 (2014–2015); 21,288 (2015–2017); 21,302 (2017–2021); 21,105 (2021–2025); 20,962 (2025–present); Theatre: 5,000–9,000
- Field size: 61 metres (200 ft) x 26 metres (85 ft)
- Public transit: Lucien-L'Allier (Metro); Lucien-L'Allier (Exo); Terminus Centre-Ville; Gare Centrale

Construction
- Groundbreaking: June 22, 1993
- Opened: March 16, 1996
- Cost: C$270 million ($499 million in 2025 dollars)
- Architects: LeMay & Associate, LLC. LeMoyne Lapointe Magne
- Project manager: IBI/DAA Group
- Structural engineer: Dessau
- Services engineer: SNC-Lavalin
- General contractor: Magil Construction

Tenants
- Montreal Canadiens (NHL) (1996–present); Montreal Roadrunners (RHI) (1996–1997); Montreal Rocket (QMJHL) (2001–2003); Montreal Express (NLL) (2002)

Bell Centre (French: Centre Bell), formerly known as Molson Centre (French: Centre Molson), is a multi-purpose indoor arena located in Montreal, Quebec, Canada. Opened on March 16, 1996, it is the home arena of the Montreal Canadiens of the National Hockey League (NHL), replacing Montreal Forum and it is the largest indoor arena in Canada. It is owned by the Molson family via the team's ownership group Groupe CH, and managed via Groupe CH subsidiary Evenko.

With a seating capacity of 20,962 in its hockey configuration, Bell Centre is the third largest ice hockey arena in the world after the SKA Arena in St. Petersburg, Russia and First Horizon Coliseum in Greensboro, North Carolina. Alongside hockey, Bell Centre has hosted major concerts, and occasional mixed martial arts and professional wrestling events. Since it opened in 1996, it has consistently been listed as one of the world's busiest arenas, usually receiving the highest attendance of any arena in Canada. In 2012, it was the fifth-busiest arena in the world based on ticket sales for non-sporting events.

== History ==
Construction began on the site on June 22, 1993, almost two weeks after the Canadiens defeated the Los Angeles Kings at the Forum for their 24th and most recent Stanley Cup. When the arena officially opened in 1996, its name initially reflected Molson, Inc., a brewing company which was owner of the Canadiens at the time. Molson elected not to keep the naming rights when they sold the team and the name was officially changed on September 1, 2002, after Bell Canada acquired the naming rights.

On October 14, 2015, it was announced that Bell Centre would undergo renovations, including the replacement of all the seats, renovated hallways and concessions, new restaurants, public Wi-Fi, and the planned conversion of Avenue des Canadiens-de-Montréal (the section of De la Gauchetière Street on which the arena is situated) into a pedestrian-only street. The renovations, which were not expected to interfere with normal operations, have a budget of $100 million.

== Location ==
Bell Centre is located in downtown Montreal in the borough of Ville-Marie, near the corner of Canadiens-de-Montréal Avenue (formerly De la Gauchetière west) and de la Montagne Street. The Lucien L'Allier commuter rail terminal, to which it is connected, is next door on that corner. In addition, it is located across the street from the 1250 René-Lévesque skyscraper. It is easily accessible by public transportation, as it is linked to both Lucien-L'Allier and Bonaventure Metro stations. It is also connected to the underground city and Central Station.

== Arena information ==
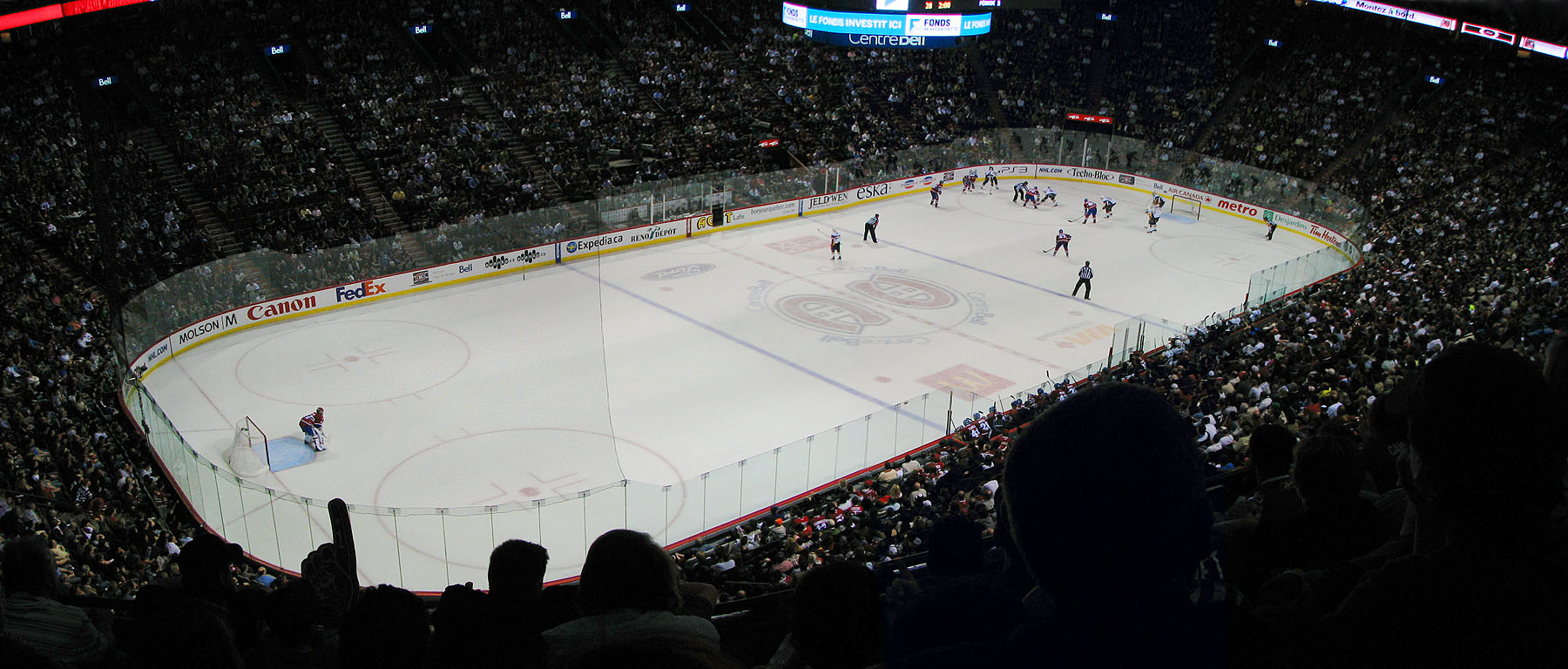
Inside the arena during a hockey game between the Montreal Canadiens and the Buffalo Sabres

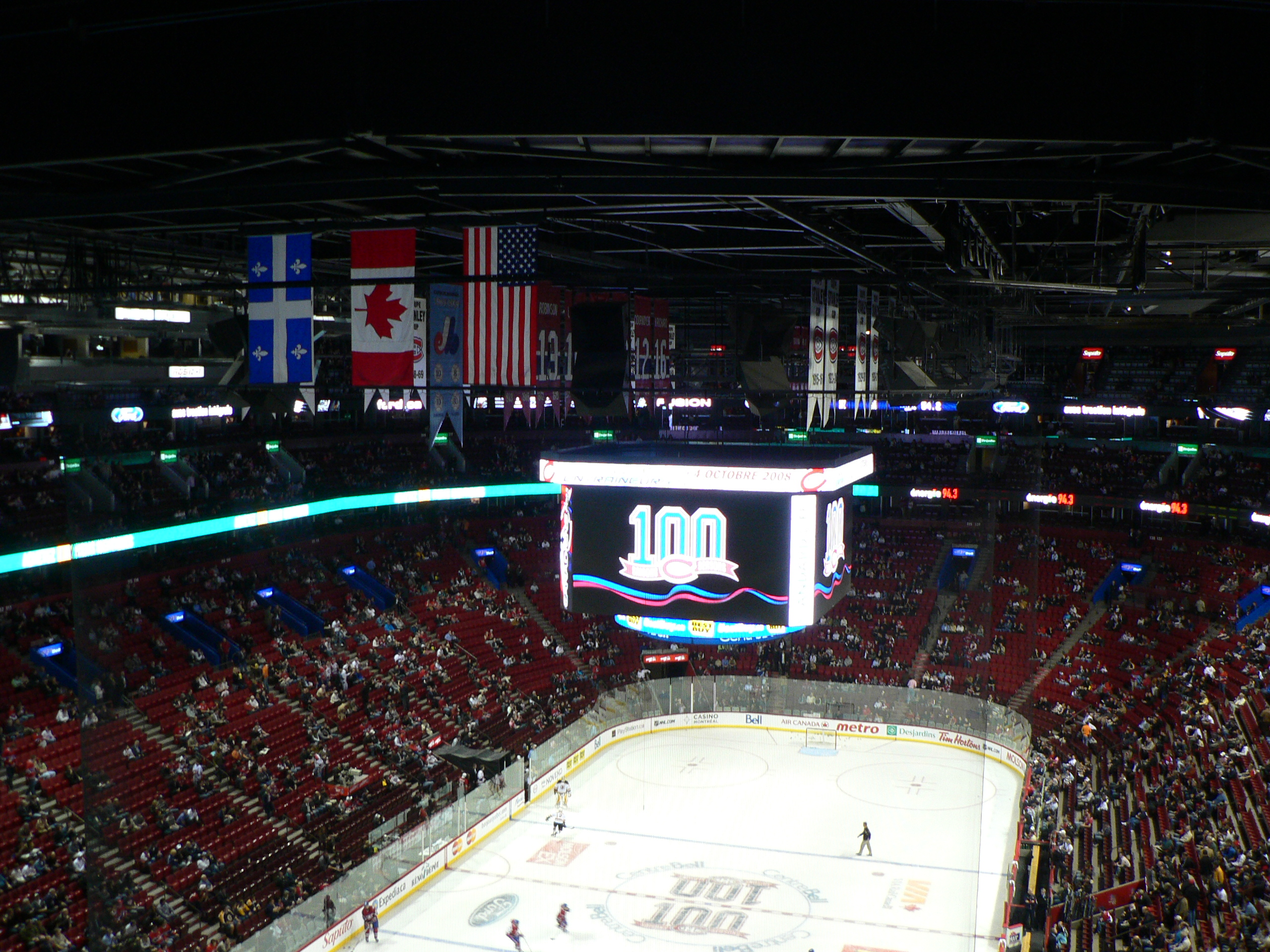
The 2008 electronic scoreboard

The building covers an area of 1.568 hectares (3.87 acres) (15,680 square metres (168,800 sq ft)). It has a seating capacity of 20,962, making it the second largest hockey arena in the world. It also holds six restaurants.

Capacities of the arena from highest to lowest are:

- Ice hockey: 20,962
- Concerts: 15,000
- Amphitheatre: 10,000–14,000
- Theatre: 5,000–9,000

A new scoreboard was installed prior of the 2008–09 season. This scoreboard consisted of four 47-square-metre (510 sq ft) video panels. It was the biggest in the NHL until 2012. Another new board was installed in 2024 with rounded edges and smaller, angled internal screens for fans in lower seats.

It is one of only two NHL arenas that uses an old-style siren to mark the end of periods instead of a horn; the other being the TD Garden in Boston. The sirens were inherited from the arenas' predecessor facilities, coming from the disused Montreal Forum and the Boston Garden respectively.

=== Seating ===
Unlike most North American arenas, which have generally been designed by Populous and its predecessors, the Bell Centre was designed by a local consortium, and has many unique design features. The grandstands are sloped steeply to improve sight lines. Washrooms on the 100 level are centralized on a specific lower level located at each end.

Bell Centre is arranged in a three-tier layout: The lower 100 section, commonly referred to as "the reds" since these seats are coloured red; the 200 section situated between the two levels of private and corporate boxes, known as "Club Desjardins" (which features premium amenities such as larger seats and free food and non-alcoholic drinks), and the upper 300 section. The ends of the 300 section are further divided into two more groups. At the end where the Canadiens shoot towards twice is the Ford Zone, featuring section cheerleaders and flashing lights. At the opposite end is the Family Zone, which features child-specific ticket prices and limited alcohol.

Seats behind the press gondola, in Sections 318, 319, and 320, feature their own scoreboards on the back of the gondola due to the normal scoreboard being blocked.

=== Interior ===
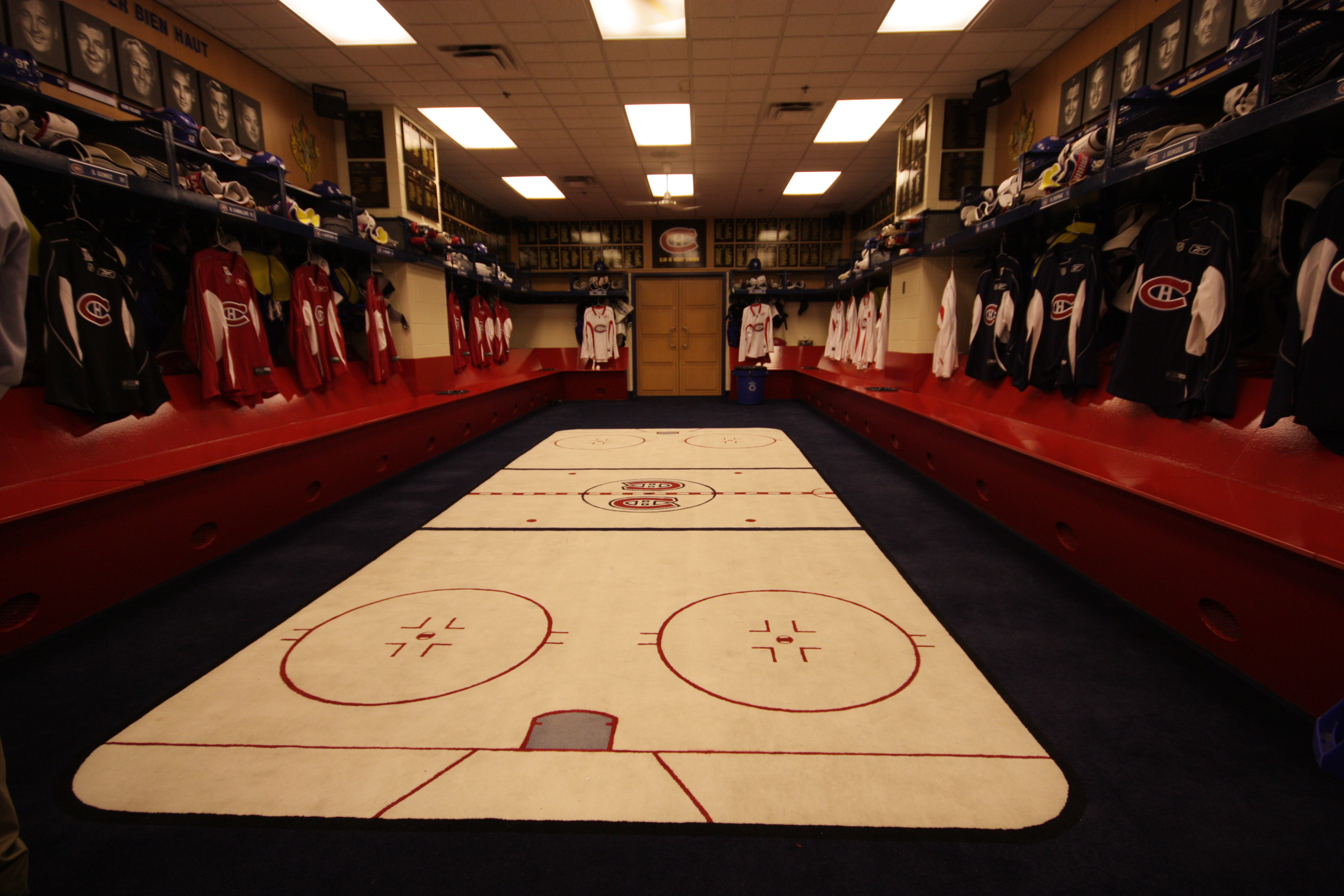
The Canadiens' locker room prior to being renovated.

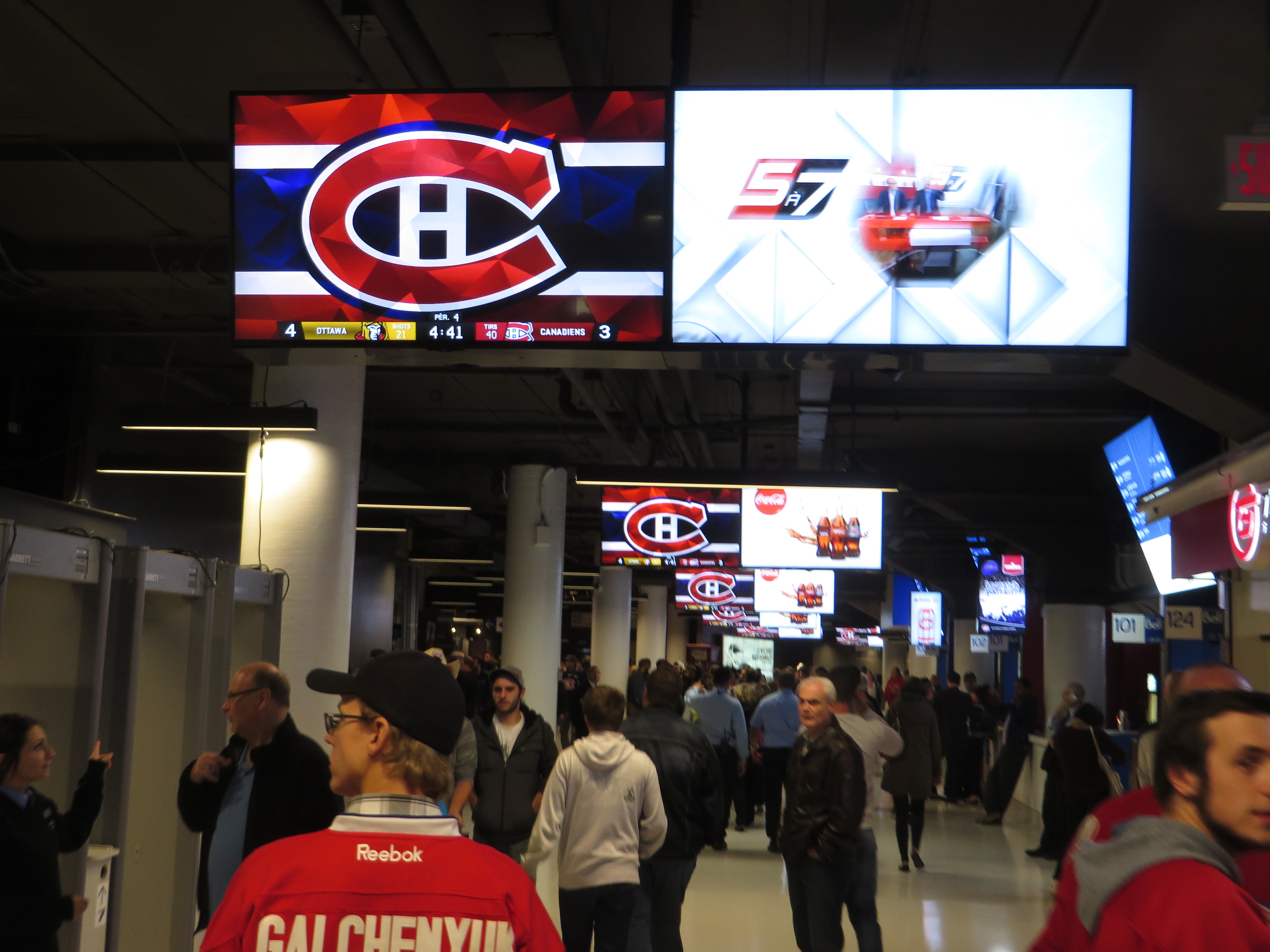
Concourse of the Bell Centre in 2016

After some early complaints of a generic feel, especially compared to the Forum, the Canadiens started to incrementally decorate the building with celebrations of the team's history, including a ring of players around the top level of seating. The Molson Ex Zone features a live band stage and its own red theme.

== Entertainment ==
Bell Centre is the main venue in Montreal for large-scale entertainment events. Many artists have performed at the arena.

The singer who has performed the most times at the Bell Centre is Céline Dion with 50 performances between 1996 and 2020 from her Falling into You: Around the World tour in 1996 and 1997, Let's Talk About Love World Tour in 1998 and 1999, Taking Chances World Tour in 2008 and 2009, Summer Tour 2016 in 2016 and Courage World Tour in 2019 and 2020. On December 31, 1999, she performed the final show of the Let's Talk About Love World Tour, which was her last performance before a three-year hiatus from the music industry.

== Sports ==
=== Ice hockey ===
The final two games of the three-game 1996 World Cup of Hockey championship series were held at Bell Centre (the United States won both games, defeating Canada in the series 2–1). Bell Centre was also host to two pool games in the 2004 World Cup of Hockey. The Bell Centre was the host of the 2009 NHL All-Star Game and hosted the 2009 and 2022 NHL entry drafts, the latter of which saw the Canadiens take Juraj Slafkovský first overall.

Montreal Canadiens home games have been almost consistently sold-out since October 2005. Additionally, the Canadiens have one of the top attendance figures in the NHL. For the 2009–2010 season, the Habs had the highest attendance played at their home arena.

On December 9, 2014, the Canadiens hosted the Vancouver Canucks, the first home game since the death of Jean Béliveau. The game was preceded by a memorial tribute to him. Bell Centre remained sold-out that night with 21,286 fans in attendance and one empty seat left for Béliveau, with the official attendance shortened by one to honour him.

Bell Centre hosted its first Stanley Cup Final in 2021, with Game 3 and 4 against the defending champion Tampa Bay Lightning played inside the arena. The Canadiens were allowed to have 2,500 people during the first and second round, then 3,500 for the semi-finals and the Stanley Cup Final due to the Government of Quebec's public health restrictions in response to the COVID-19 pandemic, although multiple fans stated that the limit was exceeded. The Canadiens had hoped to further increase their capacity limit to 10,500 fans for the Stanley Cup Finals, however that request was denied by the Government of Quebec. While the arena's capacity was limited during the playoffs, thousands more fans gathered outside the arena to watch the games on a TV screen outside of the La Cage sports bar situated adjacent to the Bell Centre.

From September 26 to October 8, 2021, 7,500 fans were allowed at the Bell Centre for the Canadiens’ pre-season games, and for the home opener on October 16, the Government of Quebec made new rules and stated that the Canadiens could return to its full capacity of 21,105 people.

On April 20, 2024, Bell Centre hosted its first home game for the new PWHL team Montreal Victoire, a special match played against the Toronto Sceptres that was marketed as the "Duel at the Top", reflecting the two teams' position atop the league standings at the time. The sell-out crowd of 21,105 set a new attendance record for a women's hockey game. The PWHL returned to the Bell Centre on March 1, 2025 between the Montreal Victoire and the Boston Fleet.

The Bell Centre was one of two host venues for the NHL 4 Nations Face-Off in February 2025, alongside TD Garden in Boston. The first four round robin games were played at the Bell Centre, featuring national teams representing the United States, Canada, Sweden and Finland.

=== Basketball ===
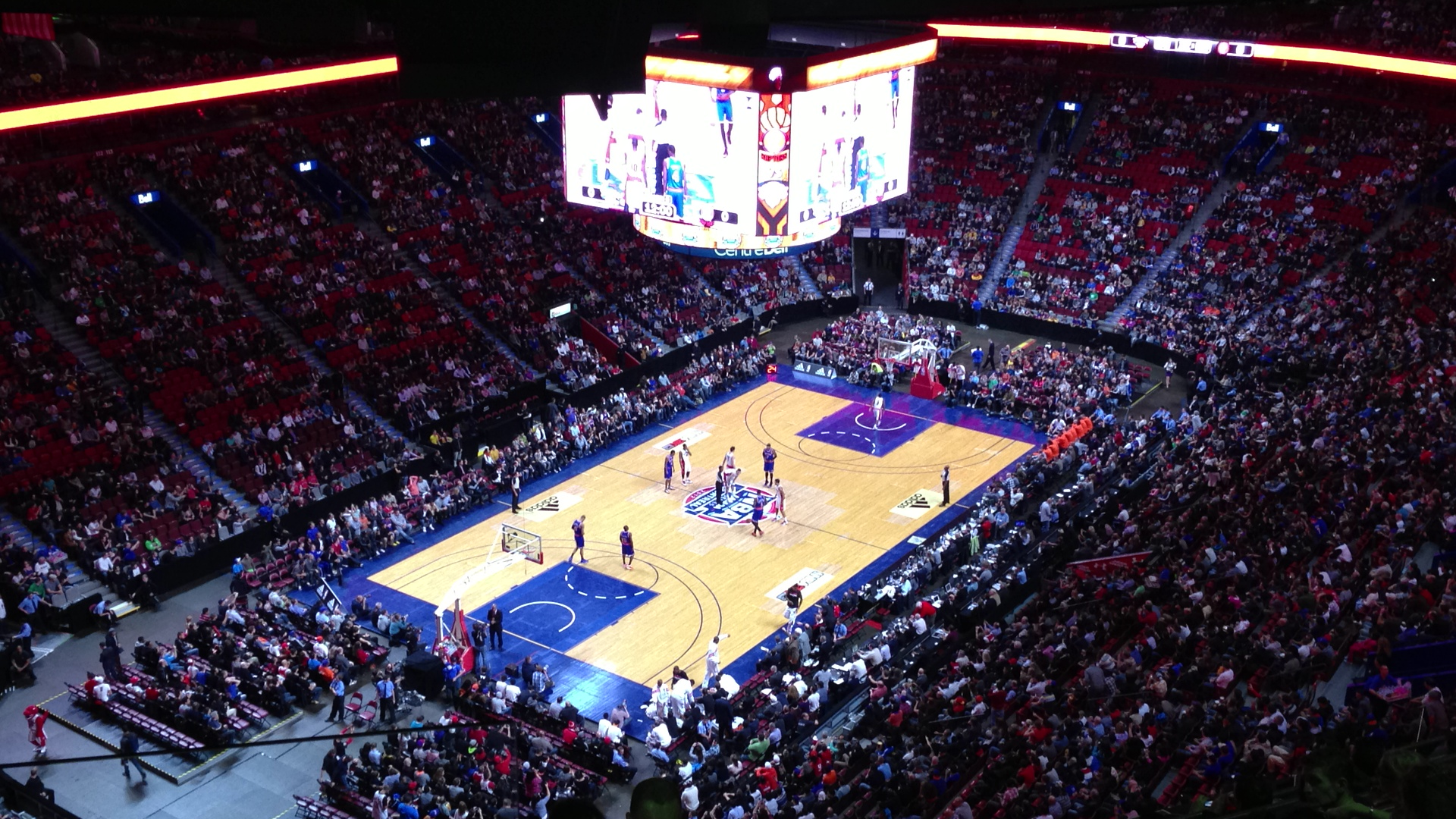
Bell Centre in a basketball configuration.

Since October 2010, Bell Centre has hosted selected NBA preseason games, primarily featuring the Toronto Raptors; the first was held on October 22, 2010, with the Raptors hosting the New York Knicks. It has since hosted preseason games as part of the NBA Canada Series, which have also included all-U.S. games. Bell Centre was also the home to two games of the Toronto Tempo during the 2026 WNBA season. Since 2010, the Bell Centre has hosted 9 NBA preseason games. 6 out of the 9 games were sold out (22,114 fans attended those games).

=== Mixed martial arts ===
Bell Centre hosted UFC 83: Serra vs. St-Pierre 2 in April 2008, marking the first UFC mixed martial arts event to take place in Canada. The main event was a rematch between Welterweight champion Matt Serra and Montreal native Georges St-Pierre. The tickets available to the public sold out in under one minute, and the event set the all time UFC attendance record, at that time (since surpassed by UFC 129: St-Pierre vs. Shields in Toronto). Other UFC events have subsequently been held at Bell Centre, including UFC 97: Redemption, UFC 113: Machida vs. Shogun 2, UFC 124: St-Pierre vs. Koscheck 2, UFC 154: St-Pierre vs. Condit, UFC 158: St-Pierre vs. Diaz and UFC 186: Johnson vs. Horiguchi, the most recent three of which were headlined by St-Pierre. The UFC returned to the arena a decade later for UFC 315: Muhammad vs. Della Maddalena on May 10, 2025.

=== Professional wrestling ===
Bell Centre has occasionally hosted WWE professional wrestling events, including four pay-per-views (Survivor Series in 1997, No Way Out in 2003, Breaking Point in 2009 and Elimination Chamber in 2023), as well as 12 broadcasts of Raw, 9 broadcasts of SmackDown, and has also hosted Saturday Night's Main Event XLIII on January 24, 2026. Elimination Chamber 2023 marked the first time that the Chamber structure was on Canadian soil and only the second time in history that the structure was outside of the United States, following the 2022 event that was held in Jeddah, Saudi Arabia, and featured Laval native Sami Zayn competing in the event's main event match for the Undisputed WWE Universal Championship against Roman Reigns. In April 2019, Bell Centre hosted both Raw and SmackDown on consecutive nights for the 2019 Superstar Shake-up, the first time in WWE history that the event was held at an arena outside of the United States. On August 19, 2022, Bell Centre hosted the 1,200th episode of SmackDown.

During Survivor Series 1997, Bell Centre was the site of the infamous "Montreal Screwjob"—a match where Calgary-native Bret Hart controversially lost the WWF Championship to his rival Shawn Michaels. Hart had signed a contract to leave WWF for the rival World Championship Wrestling (WCW) the following month, and did not want to lose a championship match to Michaels in his own country. The original plan was for the match to end by disqualification after a brawl between the wrestlers' allies, which would have allowed Hart to lose or vacate the championship at a later date before leaving the promotion. However, WWF owner Vince McMahon intervened without Hart's knowledge, and had the referee declare a Michaels victory by submission after performing a Sharpshooter on Hart, even though he had not actually submitted. Wrestling writer Mike Johnson considered the match to be "arguably the most talked-about match in the history of professional wrestling". Eight years later, in the same venue, Michaels cut his infamous "Who's your daddy, Montreal?" heel promo in the lead-up to his impending match with Hulk Hogan at SummerSlam 2005, where he referenced the Screwjob during his promo, receiving plenty of heat from the Montreal fans.

Brock Lesnar made his televised WWE debut at Bell Centre on the March 18, 2002 Raw after WrestleMania X8 in Toronto, interfering in the Hardcore match that was taking place between Maven and Al Snow. A wall on the concourse of the arena depicting iconic events that took place inside the arena includes Lesnar's debut among others.

In December 2023, All Elite Wrestling (AEW) made its Montreal debut, with broadcasts of Collision and Dynamite. AEW returned to the Bell Centre and hosted Redemption on July 26, 2026.

=== Figure skating ===
The Bell Centre was scheduled to host the 2020 World Figure Skating Championships in March of that year, but these were cancelled as a result of the onset of the COVID-19 pandemic. It was eventually used to host the 2024 edition, in lieu of the earlier planned event. This was the second time the championship took place in Montreal, the first having been held in the old Forum in 1932.

== Retired jerseys ==
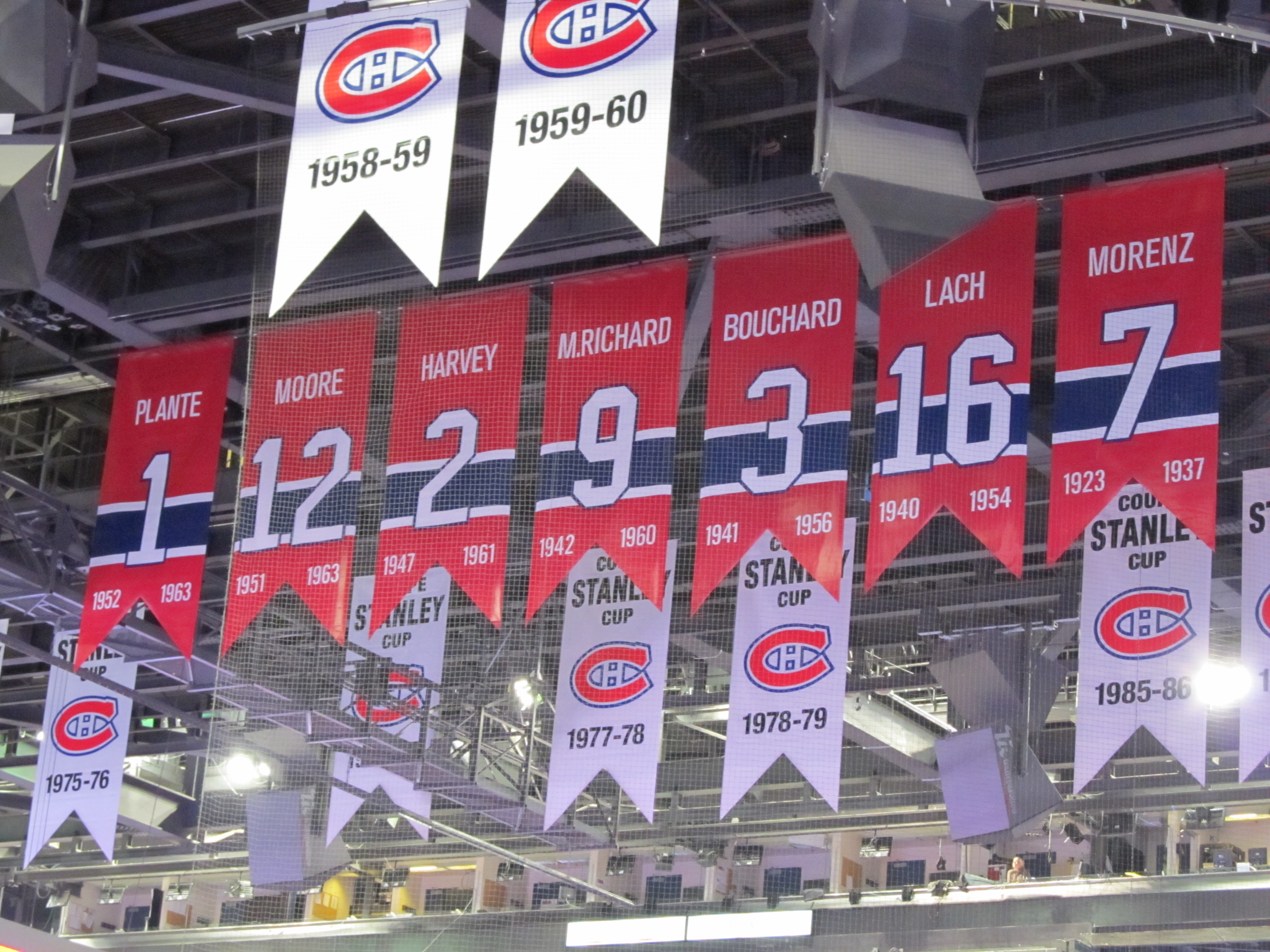
Some of the retired numbers hanging from the rafters of the Bell Centre, pictured in 2010

The following numbers have been retired by the Canadiens and hang from the rafters:

Montreal Canadiens retired numbers
No.	Player	Position	Tenure	Date of honour
1	Jacques Plante	G	1952–63	October 7, 1995
2	Doug Harvey	D	1947–61	October 26, 1985
3	Émile Bouchard	D	1941–56	December 4, 2009
4	Jean Béliveau	C	1950–71	October 9, 1971
5	Bernie Geoffrion	RW	1950–64	March 11, 2006
5	Guy Lapointe	D	1968–82	November 8, 2014
7	Howie Morenz	C	1923–37	November 2, 1937
9	Maurice Richard	RW	1942–60	October 6, 1960
10	Guy Lafleur	RW	1971–85	February 16, 1985
12	Dickie Moore	LW	1951–63	November 12, 2005
12	Yvan Cournoyer	RW	1963–79	November 12, 2005
16	Henri Richard	C	1955–75	December 10, 1975
16	Elmer Lach	C	1940–54	December 4, 2009
18	Serge Savard	D	1966–81	November 18, 2006
19	Larry Robinson	D	1972–89	November 19, 2007
23	Bob Gainey	LW	1973–89	February 23, 2008
29	Ken Dryden	G	1970–79	January 29, 2007
33	Patrick Roy	G	1984–95	November 22, 2008

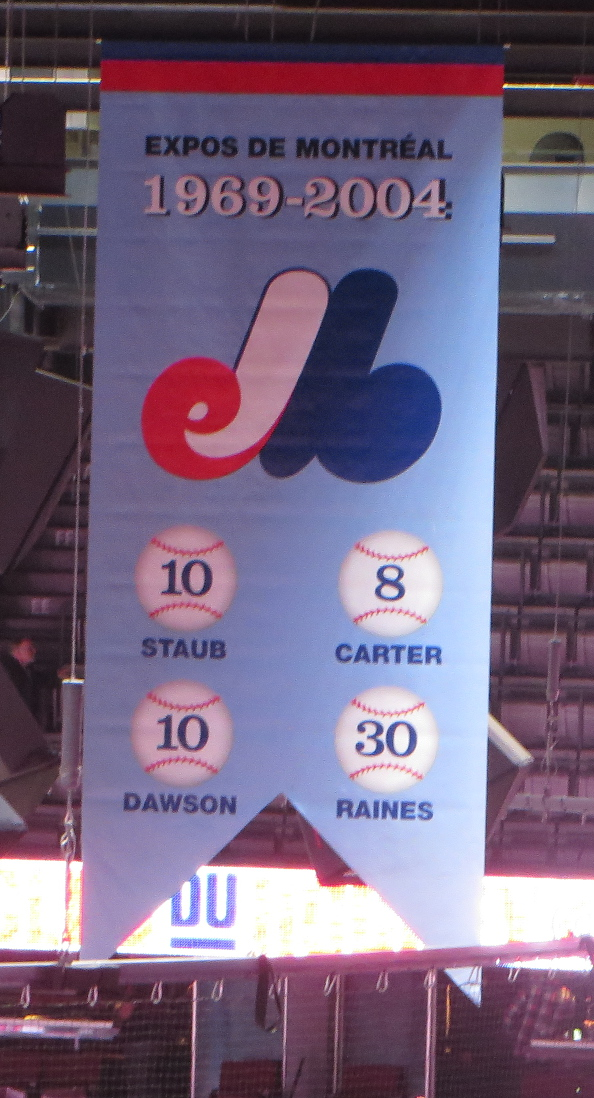
Banner with the retired numbers of the Montreal Expos at the Bell Centre

While Elmer Lach and Henri Richard both wore the number 16, they were given separate ceremonies unlike Cournoyer and Moore. All have their own banner.

=== Montreal Expos banner ===
On October 18, 2005, the Canadiens also raised a banner in honour of the former MLB team Montreal Expos, who left the city for Washington, D.C. after the 2004 season, and whose mascot, Youppi!, was adopted by the team. These numbers are not retired by the Canadiens.

The banner features the retired numbers of the Expos:

- 8 Gary Carter
- 10 Andre Dawson and Rusty Staub
- 30 Tim Raines

The only other banners hanging from the rafters at the arena are those of the Canadiens' 24 Stanley Cup championships. Unlike other NHL arenas, the Canadiens do not display division or conference championship banners.

== See also ==
- Bonaventure (metro station)
  - Connected via the underground city
- List of indoor arenas in Canada
- Statue of Guy Lafleur

Events and tenants
Preceded by Montreal Forum	Home of the Montreal Canadiens; 1996–present	Succeeded by current
Preceded by Philips Arena	Host of the NHL All-Star Game; 2009	Succeeded by RBC Center
