= Jérémy Grégoire =

Canadian ice hockey player

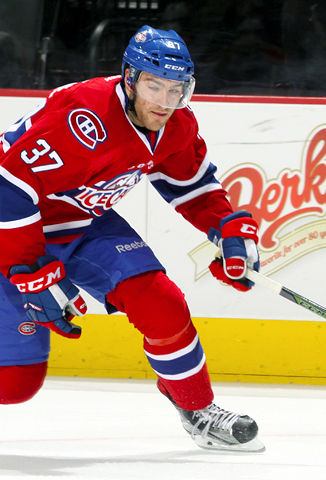
- Grégoire with the St. John's IceCaps in 2015
- Born: September 5, 1995 (age 30) Sherbrooke, Quebec, Canada
- Height: 6 ft 0 in (183 cm)
- Weight: 194 lb (88 kg; 13 st 12 lb)
- Position: Centre
- Shoots: Right
- ICEHL team Former teams: Vienna Capitals; Ilves
- NHL draft: 176th overall, 2013; Montreal Canadiens
- Playing career: 2015–present

Jérémy Grégoire (born September 5, 1995) is a Canadian professional ice hockey centre for the Vienna Capitals of the ICE Hockey League (ICEHL). He was selected in the sixth round, 176th overall, by the Montreal Canadiens in the 2013 NHL entry draft.

Prior to turning professional, Grégoire played for the Baie-Comeau Drakkar in the Quebec Major Junior Hockey League (QMJHL) where he twice won the Marcel Robert Trophy as QMJHL Scholastic Player of the Year.

== Playing career ==
=== Amateur ===
Born in Sherbrooke, Quebec, Grégoire moved to Texas and Oklahoma for his father's hockey career before returning to Quebec. While in Texas, he began playing Minor ice hockey, although the market was low in the state. After returning to Quebec, he attended École Sacré-Cœur before attending Collège du Mont-Sainte-Anne, a private all boys high school his mother taught at.

Grégoire played two seasons with the Magog Cantonniers in the Quebec Midget AAA league before becoming eligible for the United States Hockey League (USHL) and Quebec Major Junior Hockey League (QMJHL) Draft. He was eventually drafted in the 2011 USHL Draft by the Indiana Ice as well as by the Chicoutimi Saguenéens in the 2011 QMJHL Draft. Despite many playing options available, including university, he eventually chose to play in the QMJHL while continuing his studies.

In his rookie season with the Chicoutimi Saguenéens, Grégoire played in 61 games and collected 30 points. As an assistant captain for the Saguenéens during the 2012–13 season, he accrued 15 points in 35 games before being traded to the Baie-Comeau Drakkar alongside Francis Desrosiers, in exchange for Loïk Léveillé, Thomas Gobeil, and two draft picks in 2013 and 2014. He recorded 17 points in 27 games while with the Baie-Comeau Drakkar and was eventually drafted 176th overall by the Montreal Canadiens in the 2013 NHL entry draft.

On June 5, 2014, Grégoire was awarded the Guy Lafleur Award of Excellence as the player who had a great hockey performance combined with academic success. He ended the 2013–14 season second among all Drakkar players with 69 points, while also maintaining a high grade point average at Cégep de Baie-Comeau and contributing to the community. Grégoire later donated the $5,000 scholarship prize from receiving the award to runner-up Dominic Talbot-Tassi. He also won the Marcel Robert Trophy as Scholastic Player of the Year and was awarded a $500 scholarship by Fondation sport-études (Sports Study Foundation) for his academic achievements. On July 1, 2014, Grégoire signed a three-year entry-level contract with the Canadiens.

In his last season in the QMJHL, Grégoire was named captain of the Drakkar but he injured his wrist while attending the Canadiens training camp and required surgery. After his surgery in October, the team announced he was expected to miss six to eight weeks to recover. He returned to the lineup on December 27 against the Quebec Remparts after missing three months. Although his playing time was limited due to the surgery, he ended the season with 41 points and the Marcel Robert Trophy for the second time.

=== Professional ===
After his major junior hockey career had concluded, Grégoire joined the St. John's IceCaps, the Canadien's American Hockey League (AHL) affiliate, after attending the NHL affiliate training camp. He played 118 games for the IceCaps within two seasons, recording 23 points and 148 penalty minutes during that time.

Grégoire was invited to the Canadiens 2017 training camp but was cut before the final roster decision and was reassigned to their new American Hockey League affiliate, the Laval Rocket. Grégoire was suspended for one game on January 22, 2018, for instigating a fight during a fight against the Belleville Senators on January 20. He ended the season with a new career high 25 points in 63 games.

As a free agent, Grégoire signed an AHL contract with the Milwaukee Admirals on July 9, 2018. He played in his 200th career AHL game on December 5, 2018. He was traded to the Tucson Roadrunners shortlythereafter on February 8, 2019, in exchange for future considerations. The following night, he recorded his first goal with the team in a game against the Rockford IceHogs. On June 26, 2019, Grégoire was signed to a two-year AHL contract extension to continue his tenure with the Tucson Roadrunners.

Grégoire played three seasons with the Roadrunners, before leaving as a free agent and extending his career in the AHL on a one-year contract for the 2021–22 season with the Texas Stars on July 27, 2021.

Following his seventh season in the AHL, Grégoire left North America as a free agent to sign his first contract abroad in agreeing to a one-year deal with Austrian club, Vienna Capitals of the ICE Hockey League, on June 20, 2022. At the conclusion of his contract with Vienna, Grégoire remained in Europe to continue his professional career, joining Finnish club Ilves of the Liiga, on an initial trial basis before securing a one-year contract for the 2023–24 season on October 26, 2023.

== International play ==
In 2011, Grégoire represented Team Canada Quebec at the World U-17 Hockey Challenge and at the Canada Winter Games. On August 7, 2012, Grégoire was selected to play for Team Canada at the Hlinka Gretzky Cup. In 2014, he was invited to Team Canada's national junior camp to try out for their 2014 World Junior Ice Hockey Championships roster but failed to make the final cut.

== Personal life ==
Grégoire comes from a hockey involved family. His younger brother Thomas also plays hockey and his father Jean-François Grégoire is a former player and coach. His grandfather Jacques was also a hockey training coach and managing director. His mother is a French and visual arts high school teacher at Collège du Mont-Sainte-Anne.

== Career statistics ==
=== Regular season and playoffs ===
			Regular season					Playoffs
Season	Team	League	GP	G	A	Pts	PIM	GP	G	A	Pts	PIM
2010–11	Magog Cantonniers	QMAAA	38	28	25	53	42	13	8	8	16	10
2011–12	Chicoutimi Saguenéens	QMJHL	61	15	15	30	59	18	2	4	6	14
2012–13	Chicoutimi Saguenéens	QMJHL	35	7	8	15	71	—	—	—	—	—
2012–13	Baie-Comeau Drakkar	QMJHL	27	12	5	17	29	18	9	7	16	14
2013–14	Baie-Comeau Drakkar	QMJHL	65	35	34	69	84	22	9	14	23	35
2014–15	Baie-Comeau Drakkar	QMJHL	32	20	21	41	59	12	10	11	21	18
2015–16	St. John's IceCaps	AHL	62	6	5	11	70	—	—	—	—	—
2016–17	St. John's IceCaps	AHL	56	9	3	12	78	—	—	—	—	—
2017–18	Laval Rocket	AHL	63	12	13	25	115	—	—	—	—	—
2018–19	Milwaukee Admirals	AHL	42	5	7	12	74	—	—	—	—	—
2018–19	Tucson Roadrunners	AHL	26	5	2	7	39	—	—	—	—	—
2019–20	Tucson Roadrunners	AHL	51	8	14	22	88	—	—	—	—	—
2020–21	Tucson Roadrunners	AHL	34	3	8	11	68	—	—	—	—	—
2021–22	Texas Stars	AHL	49	7	5	12	109	1	0	0	0	0
2022–23	Vienna Capitals	ICEHL	39	14	21	35	90	11	3	4	7	9
2023–24	Ilves Tampere	Liiga	44	4	4	8	63	—	—	—	—	—
AHL totals			383	55	57	112	641	1	0	0	0	0

=== International ===
Year	Team	Event	Result	GP	G	A	Pts	PIM
2011	Canada Quebec	U17	4th	6	0	1	1	12
2012	Canada Quebec	U17	6th	5	1	3	4	2
2012	Canada	IH18	1st place, gold medalist(s)	5	0	0	0	4
Junior totals				16	1	4	5	18

== Awards and honours ==
Award	Year
QMJHL
Marcel Robert Trophy	2014, 2015
Guy Lafleur Award of Excellence	2014
