= Guy Lafleur =

Canadian ice hockey player (1951–2022)

OC CQ Guy Lafleur
- Hockey Hall of Fame, 1988
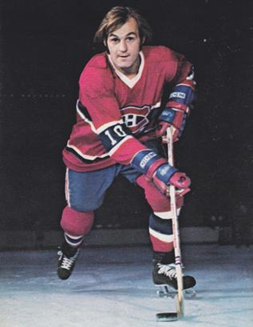
- Lafleur with the Montreal Canadiens in 1975
- Born: September 20, 1951 Thurso, Quebec, Canada
- Died: April 22, 2022 (aged 70) Kirkland, Quebec, Canada
- Height: 6 ft 0 in (183 cm)
- Weight: 185 lb (84 kg; 13 st 3 lb)
- Position: Right wing
- Shot: Right
- Played for: Montreal Canadiens; New York Rangers; Quebec Nordiques
- National team: Canada
- NHL draft: 1st overall, 1971; Montreal Canadiens
- Playing career: 1971–1985; 1988–1991
Medal record
Representing Canada
Ice hockey
Canada Cup
Gold medal – first place	1976 Canada

Guy Damien Lafleur OC CQ (September 20, 1951 – April 22, 2022), nicknamed "the Flower" and "Le Démon Blond", was a Canadian professional ice hockey player. He was the first player in National Hockey League (NHL) history to score 50 goals in six consecutive seasons as well as 50 goals and 100 points in six consecutive seasons. Between 1971 and 1991, Lafleur played right wing for the Montreal Canadiens, New York Rangers, and Quebec Nordiques in an NHL career spanning 17 seasons, and five Stanley Cup championships in 1973, 1976, 1977, 1978, and 1979 (all with the Canadiens). Lafleur was inducted into the Hockey Hall of Fame in 1988, named one of the 100 Greatest NHL Players in history in 2017, and was named to the Order of Hockey in Canada in 2022.

== Early life ==
Lafleur was born on September 20, 1951, in Thurso, Quebec. He started playing hockey at the age of five after receiving his first hockey stick as a Christmas present.

== Playing career ==
=== Amateur career ===
As a youth, he played at the Quebec International Pee-Wee Hockey Tournament three consecutive years from 1962 to 1964, and scored a tournament record of 64 points. In his teens, Lafleur gained considerable recognition for his play as a member of the Quebec Remparts of the Quebec Major Junior Hockey League, where he led his team to the Memorial Cup in 1971, scoring 130 regular season goals. At the time, Lafleur idolized Jean Béliveau and Bobby Orr. He gained the nickname "Le Turbo de Thurso" while playing with the Remparts, coined by Radio Canada broadcaster Jean-Bernard Rainville.

=== Montreal Canadiens ===
==== 1971 NHL entry draft ====
With Lafleur and fellow Quebecer Marcel Dionne among the top prospects in the 1971 NHL Amateur Draft, the Montreal Canadiens' general manager, Sam Pollock, was keen to find a way to trade to obtain one of the top two picks. He persuaded California Golden Seals owner Charlie Finley to trade the Seals' 1971 first-round pick and François Lacombe in return for Montreal's 1970 first-round pick and veteran Ernie Hicke. Oakland finished last, leaving Montreal with the first overall pick. Pollock hesitated between Lafleur and Dionne, but chose Lafleur with the first draft choice.

==== Dynasty (1971–1979) ====
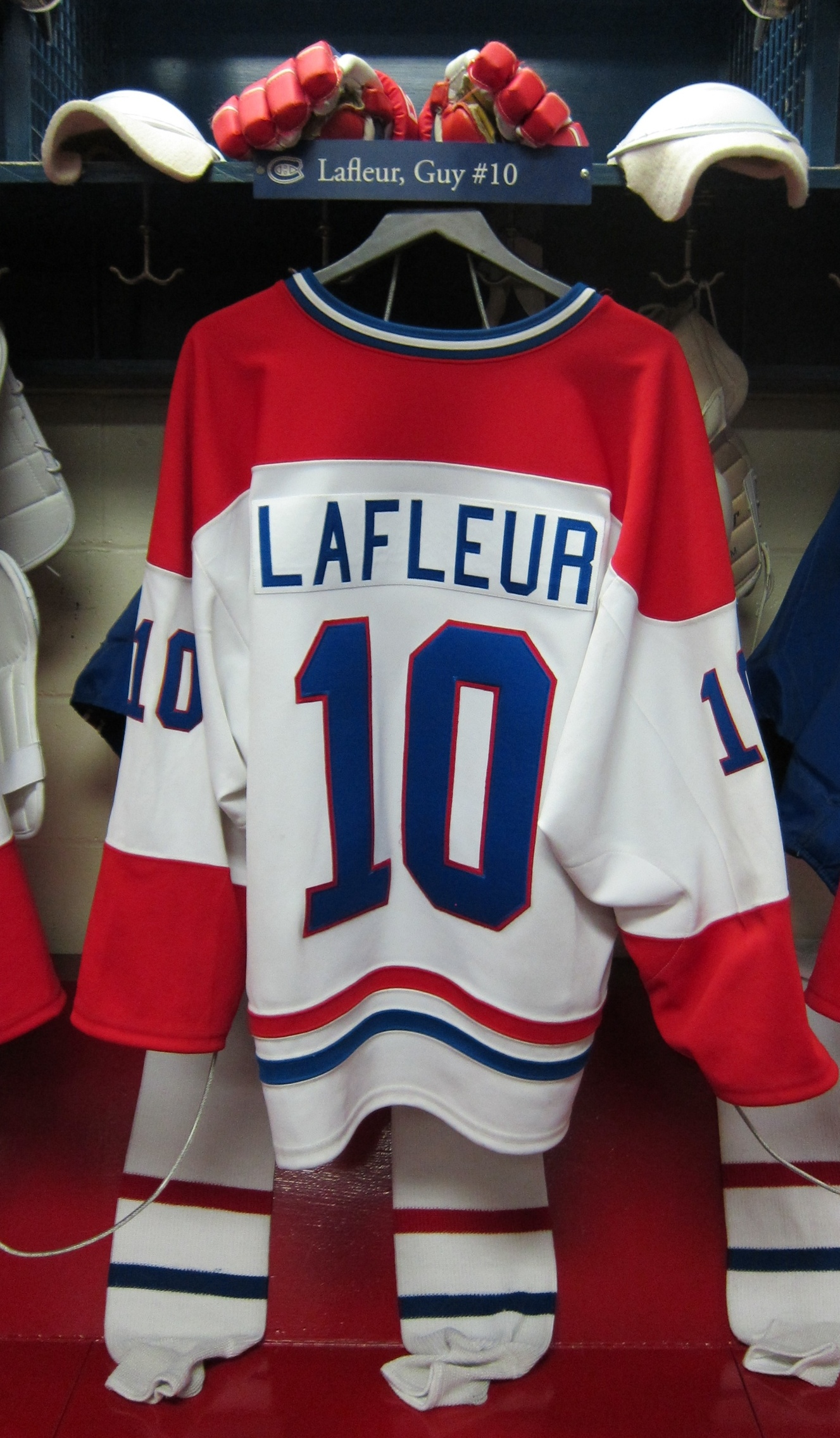
A replica Guy Lafleur jersey at the Montreal Canadiens locker room display in the Hockey Hall of Fame.

Lafleur wore No. 10, as Beliveau originally asked Lafleur to take his No. 4, then had second thoughts, saying, "Don't try to be a second Jean Beliveau. Be the first Guy Lafleur. Take a number and make it your own." Lafleur received little ice time in his rookie season, as the Canadiens were deep in veteran players. During his first three seasons, Lafleur struggled to live up to expectations in the league as he posted average statistics—the more so in that Dionne became an immediate star in Detroit who led his team in scoring over his first three seasons.

By his fourth season, 1974–75, Lafleur had developed his trademark smooth skating style and scoring touch, making him one of the most popular players on a very popular team; fans chanted "Guy, Guy, Guy!" whenever he touched the puck. Lafleur's obituary on Sportsnet described him as a "Jackson Pollock painting on ice, a frenetic innovator who pushed the boundaries of his art beyond what had ever been conceived, a singularly dynamic force that turned an everyday sight as simple as a man on skates with a puck on his stick into a masterpiece — something you had seen before, perhaps, but never quite like that". Opposing players often hooked and slashed Lafleur, but he never retaliated. Former teammate Réjean Houle said that "Guy lived 100 miles an hour. One hundred miles an hour everywhere. One hundred miles an hour when he went to Quebec in his car. One hundred miles an hour on the rink. One hundred miles an hour on Crescent St." Besides his on-ice artistry, Lafleur was also known for his charisma as he was frequently in demand with the press and fans, with former Montreal Gazette sports columnist Michael Farber saying "Jean Béliveau was magisterial. Jean Béliveau was our father — and Guy Lafleur was our cool older brother. Lafleur wasn't a quiet guy and if you look at his era, that was not a quiet time. Lafleur was a product of the '70s. There were loud colours, loud clothing — we've seen pictures of the sideburns". Those who encountered Lafleur personally lauded his down-to-earth persona and humility. Lafleur became known among English-speaking fans as "the Flower" due to his literal translation of his surname, while among French fans he was dubbed "le Démon Blond" (the Blond Demon). He was one of several players nicknamed "the Flying Frenchman".

Lafleur was a cornerstone of the Canadiens' four straight Stanley Cup championships from 1976 to 1979, including being named playoff MVP in 1977. During the 1978 Stanley Cup Final, Boston Bruins head coach Don Cherry ordered his players to put their sticks up and hit Lafleur whenever they encountered him. At the end of the series, Lafleur's head was swathed in bandages after numerous slashes from Bruin players. After Montreal won the Stanley Cup, he borrowed it for the weekend without telling anyone to show his friends back home in Thurso, where he set it out on his front lawn for all his neighbours to see.

In 1979, Lafleur released the album Lafleur!, consisting of Guy Lafleur reciting hockey instructions, accompanied by disco music.

==== Decline and first retirement (1980–1985) ====
With Ken Dryden, Jacques Lemaire, and several other key players retiring after the conclusion of the 1979 season, the Canadiens' dynasty came to an end with the team losing in the second round of the 1980 playoffs to the Minnesota North Stars in seven games. Injuries shortened Lafleur's 1980–81 season and his production dropped significantly (during the previous six seasons, Lafleur had reached or exceeded 100 points and 50 goals). In the following seasons, he was overshadowed by Mike Bossy and Wayne Gretzky.

While driving home on March 24, 1981, Lafleur fell asleep at the wheel of his Cadillac and crashed into a highway fence. A metal post pierced the windshield, missing his head by an inch while grazing his right ear. During the 1980–81 season, Lafleur appeared in only 51 games and scored 27 goals. It was the first time since the 1973–74 season that he failed to score 50 goals or more in a season. The Canadiens' next three seasons would all end with shock first round exits: a first round sweep by Gretzky's Edmonton Oilers, a loss in the fifth and deciding game to Montreal's provincial rival Quebec Nordiques, and another three-game sweep at the hands of the Buffalo Sabres.

On December 20, 1983, LaFleur scored his 500th career goal, doing so at Byrne Meadowlands Arena against the New Jersey Devils in the third period on a rising shot over Glenn Resch. He was the third Montreal player to record 500 goals and only the tenth player to do so in NHL history. The 1983–84 season produced Montreal's first losing record of the expansion era, and resulted in coach Bob Berry being replaced 63 games into the season by Lafleur's former teammate Jacques Lemaire. At first, Lemaire's hiring was seen as a success as he guided the Canadiens to their first playoff series victories since 1980 and reached the Wales Conference Final. Though the Canadiens' new coach had been Lafleur's centreman during many of the glory years of the 1970s, the former linemates quickly struggled to transform their relationship to an amicable one between coach and player. In time, Lemaire became renowned as one of the NHL's finest defensively-minded coaches. Lafleur was always an offensive-minded player who believed his productivity overshadowed any defensive weaknesses. Lemaire's insistence that everyone on his teams contribute defensively promptly caused a rift between him and Lafleur that never healed. By 1985, due to a rocky relationship with Lemaire, Lafleur felt this had become intolerable and requested a trade. General manager Serge Savard refused Lafleur's request, as trading one of the most popular players in Canadiens history would have incurred a severe backlash from fans and the media. With no other options, Lafleur decided to retire, and his departure from the Canadiens was considered acrimonious.

=== Return to the NHL (1988–1991) ===
After being inducted into the Hockey Hall of Fame, Lafleur came out of retirement to return to the NHL for three more seasons, from 1988 through 1991, with the New York Rangers and the Quebec Nordiques. Lafleur remained one of the few players who did not wear protective helmets due to a grandfather clause. According to Wayne Gretzky, Lafleur "was quicker and faster without wearing full shoulder pads".

In July 1988, Yves Tremblay, Lafleur's agent and best friend, had an idea. He called Michel Bergeron, New York Rangers' coach, to ask him if he was interested to get Guy on his team. He contacted also the Penguins, the Red Wings and the Kings. But Bergeron and Phil Esposito, Rangers' general manager, called back Tremblay to organize a meeting two days later in New York. Lafleur and Tremblay convinced Esposito to sign Lafleur to a one-year contract. During his first game back in the Montreal Forum, he received a standing ovation when he came on the ice, and as in his heyday with the Canadiens, the crowd chanted "Guy! Guy! Guy!" every time he touched the puck. Lafleur scored twice against Patrick Roy, to heavy applause, during the Rangers' 7–5 loss to the Canadiens, and was awarded the first star of the game. Although his high-scoring days were well behind him, his stint with the Rangers was moderately successful, and he helped the team to first place in the Patrick Division until being knocked out by a knee injury.

Lafleur then followed dismissed Rangers head coach and close friend Michel Bergeron to the Nordiques for his final seasons. Intending to finish his hockey career in Quebec where he had started, Lafleur reportedly turned down a $1 million offer from the Los Angeles Kings which would have allowed him to play alongside Wayne Gretzky. Lafleur managed 24 goals in 98 games with the Nordiques over two seasons, while also mentoring emerging star center Joe Sakic, Despite Lafleur's presence, the Nordiques owned the NHL's worst record in both seasons Lafleur played with them. During Lafleur's final NHL game he was cheered every time he touched the puck and leapt over the boards and received a long standing ovation; the referee for that contest was Paul Stewart (coincidentally Stewart's final NHL game as a player was when his Nordiques played against Lafleur's Canadiens on April 6, 1980).

The Minnesota North Stars selected Lafleur with the final pick in the 1991 Expansion Draft. Lafleur had decided to retire for a second and last time as a player, and he had already agreed to an off-ice job with the Nordiques. The league's bylaws prevented him from accepting a job with a team that did not own his playing rights. The North Stars solved Lafleur's quandary by trading him back to Quebec. In exchange, they received the rights to a former Nordique who had been playing in Switzerland for two years, Alan Haworth. Haworth played just one more year of professional hockey, and never returned to the NHL.

== Life after hockey ==
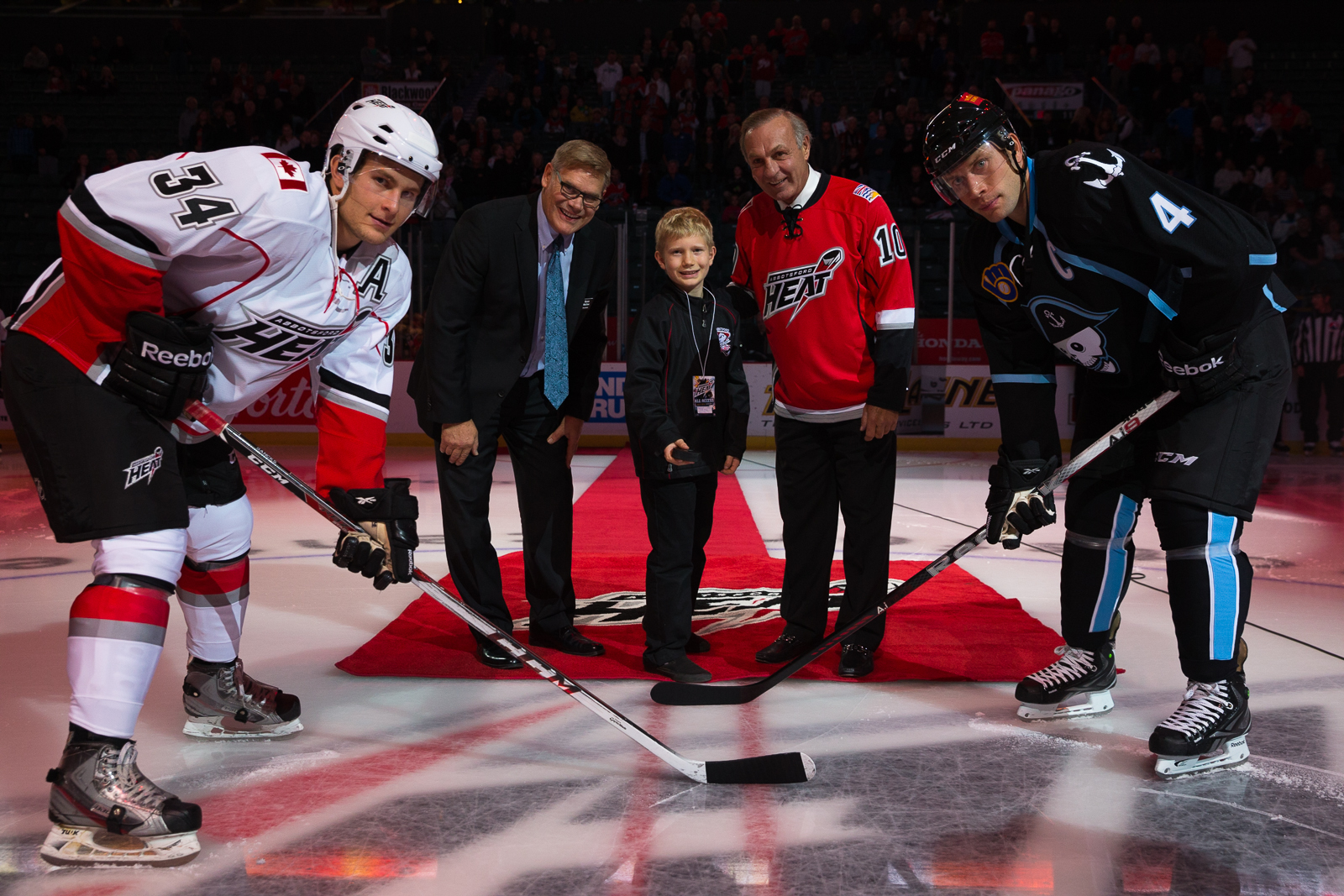
Guy Lafleur (right background) conducting a ceremonial faceoff prior to an American Hockey League game in 2013

Lafleur was a licensed helicopter pilot. He was part owner of a helicopter transportation company. He was the copilot when the Tampa Bay Lightning's André Roy proposed to his fiancée, the Stanley Cup serving as the engagement ring bearer.

In the 1990s, Lafleur had his own brand of fruit juice energy drink, "Flower Power".

Lafleur also owned a restaurant in Berthierville, Quebec, "Guy Lafleur Mikes Signature", which opened in 2002. He opened a new restaurant, called "Bleu, Blanc, Rouge!" in Rosemère, Quebec, in 2008. Lafleur sold the "Bleu, Blanc Rouge" in December 2012. The restaurant closed on December 22, 2012.

From 2005 to 2008 Lafleur was appointed honorary colonel of 12 Radar Squadron, an air force unit in Bagotville, Quebec. In February 2013 he was appointed honorary colonel of 3 Wing Bagotville, the parent formation of 12 Radar Squadron. Honorary colonels generally serve for three years.

In 2007 Lafleur's son Mark was arrested for assault, forcible confinement, and other charges, and remained at his father's house as part of his bail conditions. In 2009, Lafleur was charged with giving contradictory testimony about whether Mark had respected his curfew. Lafleur was convicted in 2009, but in August 2010, he was unanimously acquitted of all charges by the Quebec Court of Appeal. He filed a $2.8 million civil suit against police and prosecutors, claiming that his rights were violated and his reputation damaged but did not win his case.

== Illness and death ==
In September 2019, Lafleur began having health issues and had open heart surgery with five bypasses. In November 2019, he had a cancerous lobe removed from his left lung. In October 2020, cancer was diagnosed in his right lung.

Lafleur died on April 22, 2022, at age 70, exactly one week after Mike Bossy, who also succumbed to lung cancer (both smoked heavily during their playing days); both were Quebec natives whose contemporary careers as star right-wingers were often compared.

The Canadiens honoured Lafleur with a video tribute prior to their game against the Boston Bruins on April 24, 2022. The tribute was met with a standing ovation spanning just over ten minutes.

He was given a national funeral on May 3, 2022, in Montreal, Quebec.

== Accolades and legacy ==
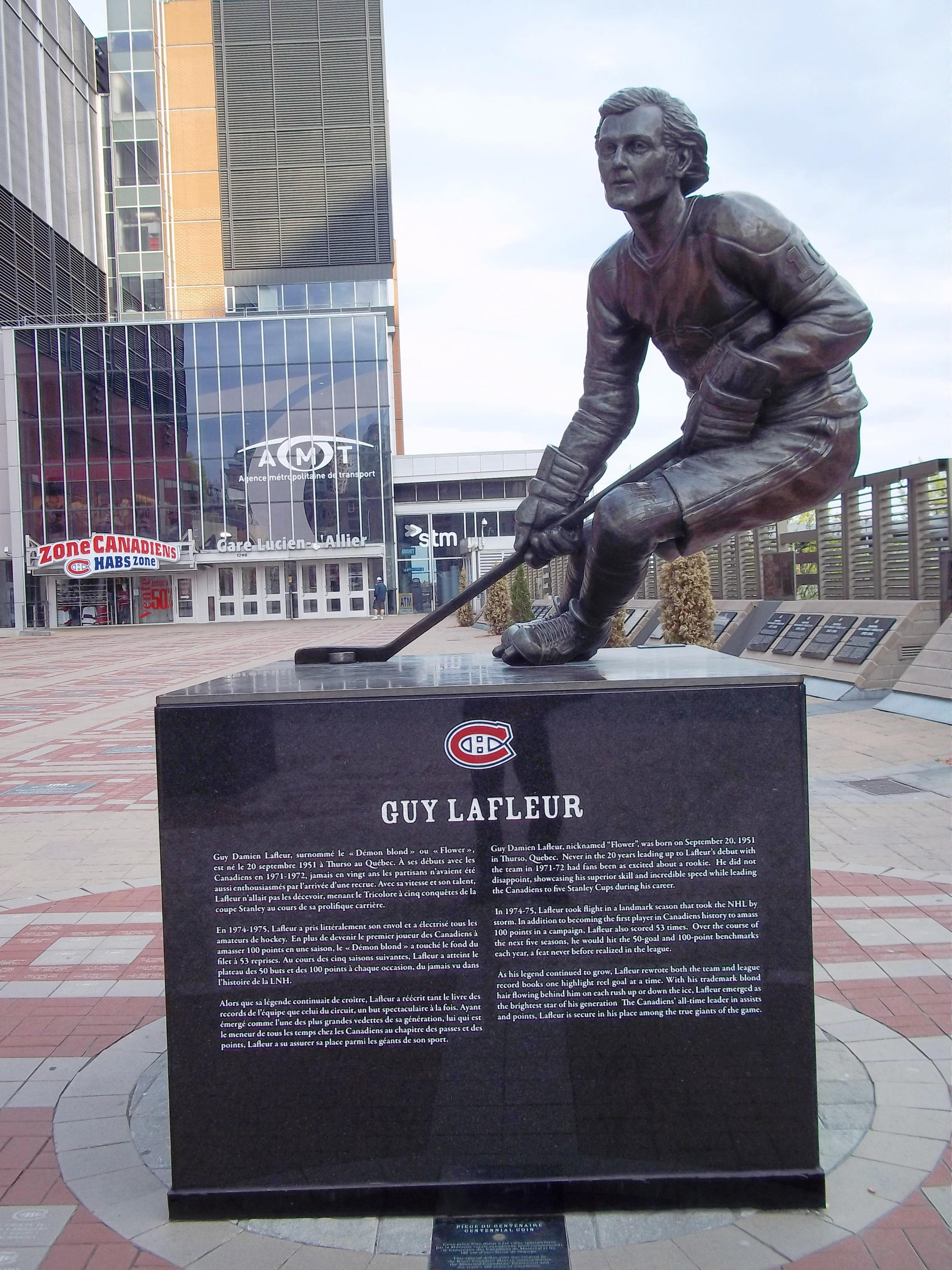
Statue of Guy Lafleur located at the entrance of the Bell Centre in Montreal

Lafleur is the all-time leading scorer in Canadiens history, notching 1,246 points, made up of the club's second highest (behind Maurice "Rocket" Richard) all-time goals, with 518, and the most all-time assists, with 728, in his 14 years with Montreal. He led the NHL in points in 1976, 1977, and 1978. He tied for a Montreal club record with Steve Shutt for goals in a season with 60 in 1977–78 and holds the franchise record for points in a season with 136 in 1976–77. Lafleur became the first player in NHL history to score at least 50 goals and 100 points in six consecutive seasons, all as a Hab. Lafleur was also the fastest player (at the time) to reach 1,000 points, doing so in only 720 games. That record has since been broken by Wayne Gretzky, Mario Lemieux, and three others.

He was a member of the Canadian team in the 1976 and 1981 Canada Cup tournaments, winning the Cup in 1976. He was the recipient of the Lou Marsh Trophy in 1977.

On February 16, 1985, Lafleur became the fifth player from the Montreal Canadiens to have his sweater number retired. Lafleur was inducted into the Hockey Hall of Fame in 1988 and the Canadian Sports Hall of Fame in 1996. Along with Gordie Howe before him and Mario Lemieux after him, Lafleur is one of only three players to have returned to the NHL after being inducted into the Hockey Hall of Fame.

In April 2001, Lafleur sold most of his personal hockey memorabilia in a silent auction. 122 items were sold, including miniature replicas of NHL trophies, jerseys, pucks, sticks, and skates. Included in the sale were his 1977 Conn Smythe Trophy, 1977 Hart Trophy, the puck for his first goal, and four of his five Stanley Cup rings. The items' selling prices totalled approximately US$400,000, with Lafleur donating $20,000 to $25,000 to the Montreal Canadiens Foundation.

Besides the honours received during his playing career, in 1980 he was made an Officer of the Order of Canada, and in 2005, he was made a Knight of the National Order of Quebec.

In 1979, he received the Golden Plate Award of the American Academy of Achievement.

The Guy Lafleur Award of Excellence was introduced in 1985.

In 1998, he was ranked number 11 on The Hockey News list of the 100 Greatest Hockey Players. In 2017, he was named one of the 100 Greatest NHL Players by the NHL as part of its centennial celebration.

The QMJHL retired Lafleur's number 4 league-wide at the start of the 2021–22 season.

Lafleur was named to the Order of Hockey in Canada in 2022. Quebec Autoroute 50, which passes through his hometown of Thurso, was renamed in his honor on May 4, 2023. He lived for 30 years on the island of Île Bizard, and the Guy Lafleur Bridge which connects it to the Island of Montreal was renamed after him in September 2025.

=== Awards ===
- 5× Stanley Cup champion (1973, 1976, 1977, 1978, 1979)
- 3× Art Ross Trophy winner (1976, 1977, 1978)
- 2× Hart Memorial Trophy winner (1977, 1978)
- 3× Lester B. Pearson Award winner (1976, 1977, 1978)
- 6× First-Team All-Star Right Winger (1975, 1976, 1977, 1978, 1979, 1980)
- Conn Smythe Trophy winner (1977)
- 7× Molson Cup winner (1975, 1976, 1977, 1978, 1979, 1980, 1982)

== Career statistics ==
=== Regular season and playoffs ===
Bold indicates led league

			Regular season					Playoffs
Season	Team	League	GP	G	A	Pts	PIM	GP	G	A	Pts	PIM
1966–67	Québec Junior Aces	QJHL	8	1	1	2	0	—	—	—	—	—
1967–68	Québec Junior Aces	QJHL	43	30	19	49	—	—	—	—	—	—
1968–69	Québec Junior Aces	QJHL	49	50	60	110	83	—	—	—	—	—
1969–70	Quebec Remparts	QJHL	56	103	67	170	105	15	25	18	43	34
1969–70	Quebec Remparts	M-Cup	—	—	—	—	—	12	18	18	36	23
1970–71	Quebec Remparts	QMJHL	62	130	79	209	135	14	22	21	43	24
1970–71	Quebec Remparts	M-Cup	—	—	—	—	—	7	9	5	14	18
1971–72	Montreal Canadiens	NHL	73	29	35	64	48	6	1	4	5	2
1972–73	Montreal Canadiens	NHL	69	28	27	55	51	17	3	5	8	9
1973–74	Montreal Canadiens	NHL	73	21	35	56	29	6	0	1	1	4
1974–75	Montreal Canadiens	NHL	70	53	66	119	37	11	**12**	7	19	15
1975–76	Montreal Canadiens	NHL	80	56	69	**125**	36	13	7	10	17	2
1976–77	Montreal Canadiens	NHL	80	56	**80**	**136**	20	14	9	**17**	**26**	6
1977–78	Montreal Canadiens	NHL	78	**60**	72	**132**	26	15	**10**	11	**21**	16
1978–79	Montreal Canadiens	NHL	80	52	77	129	28	16	10	**13**	**23**	0
1979–80	Montreal Canadiens	NHL	74	50	75	125	12	3	3	1	4	0
1980–81	Montreal Canadiens	NHL	51	27	43	70	29	3	0	1	1	2
1981–82	Montreal Canadiens	NHL	66	27	57	84	24	5	2	1	3	4
1982–83	Montreal Canadiens	NHL	68	27	49	76	12	3	0	2	2	2
1983–84	Montreal Canadiens	NHL	80	30	40	70	19	12	0	3	3	5
1984–85	Montreal Canadiens	NHL	19	2	3	5	10	—	—	—	—	—
1988–89	New York Rangers	NHL	67	18	27	45	12	4	1	0	1	0
1989–90	Quebec Nordiques	NHL	39	12	22	34	4	—	—	—	—	—
1990–91	Quebec Nordiques	NHL	59	12	16	28	2	—	—	—	—	—
NHL totals			1,126	560	793	1,353	399	128	58	76	134	67

=== International ===
Year	Team	Event	GP	G	A	Pts	PIM
1976	Canada	CC	7	1	5	6	12
1981	Canada	WC	7	1	0	1	2
1981	Canada	CC	7	2	9	11	0
Senior totals			21	4	14	18	14

== See also ==
- List of NHL statistical leaders
- List of NHL players with 1,000 games played
- List of NHL players with 1,000 points
- List of NHL players with 500 goals
- List of NHL players with 100 point seasons
- List of NHL players with 50 goal seasons

Sporting positions
Preceded by Gilbert Perreault	NHL first overall draft pick 1971	Succeeded by Billy Harris
Preceded by Chuck Lefley	Montreal Canadiens first-round draft pick 1971	Succeeded by Chuck Arnason
Awards
Preceded by Bobby Clarke	Winner of the Hart Memorial Trophy; 1977, 1978	Succeeded by Bryan Trottier
Preceded by Steve Shutt	NHL Goal Leader; 1978	Succeeded by Mike Bossy
Preceded by Reggie Leach	Winner of the Conn Smythe Trophy; 1977	Succeeded by Larry Robinson
Preceded by Bobby Orr	Winner of the Art Ross Trophy; 1976, 1977, 1978	Succeeded by Bryan Trottier
Preceded by Bobby Orr	Winner of the Lester B. Pearson Award; 1976, 1977, 1978	Succeeded by Marcel Dionne
