= Statue of Guy Lafleur =

Outdoor sculpture in Montreal, Quebec, Canada

Guy Lafleur
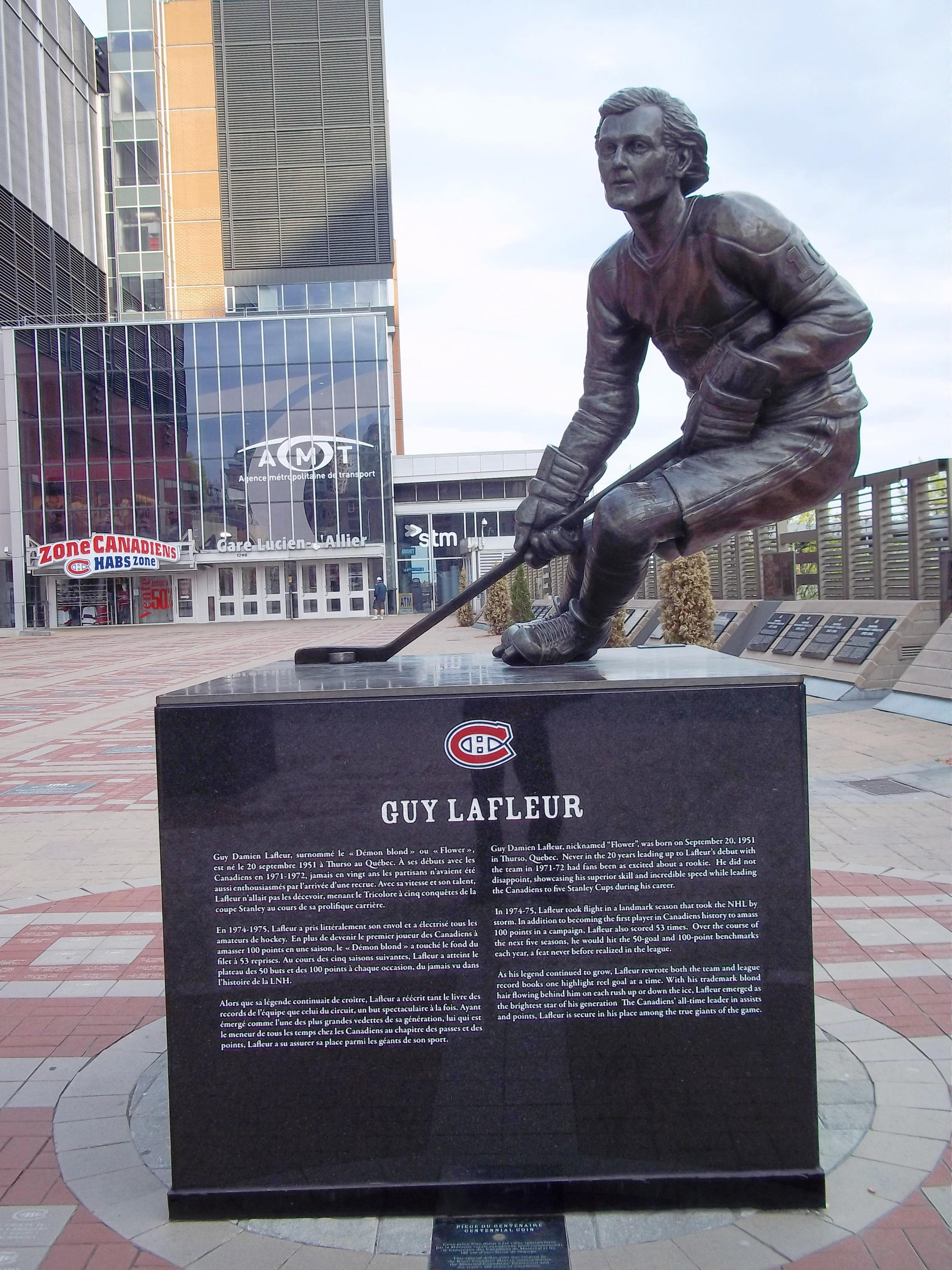
- The sculpture in 2012
- Medium: Sculpture
- Subject: Guy Lafleur
- Location: Montreal, Quebec, Canada; 45.49646°N 73.56885°W

Guy Lafleur is an outdoor sculpture depicting the Canadian professional ice hockey player of the same name, installed outside Montreal's Bell Centre, in Quebec, Canada.
