= Evenko =

Canadian event promoter

- Predecessor: Gillett Entertainment Group (2002–2010)
- Headquarters: Montreal, Quebec
- Parent: Groupe CH
- Website: www.evenko.ca

evenko, a Quebec-based company, is one of Canada’s largest promoters and producers. Each year, evenko produces nearly 1,600 music, family and sports events throughout Quebec, the Atlantic provinces, and the eastern United States. The company presents shows from the world’s biggest artists and invests in the development and promotion of Quebec artists. The OSHEAGA Music and Arts Festival, îLESONIQ, LASSO Montréal, HEAVY MTL and '77 Montréal are created and produced by evenko, which also serves as the exclusive manager of the Bell Centre, Laval’s Place Bell, MTELUS, Théâtre Beanfield, and Brossard’s Théâtre Manuvie and Le Club Dix30.

evenko has once again been ranked Canada's #1 promoter in 2025 (source: Pollstar, December 2025).

The company is owned by the Montreal Canadiens' ownership group Groupe CH, which is the Molson family. It handles event booking for venues. The company was started in 2002 during George N. Gillett Jr.'s ownership of the Canadiens, and originally known as Gillett Entertainment Group.

In 2013, it acquired L'Equipe Spectra, organizer of Les Francos de Montréal and the Montreal International Jazz Festival. On June 7, 2018, it was announced that a partnership of Evenko and Bell Media had acquired a 51% majority stake in Montreal comedy festival Just for Laughs.

In December 2019, Evenko announced a "strategic partnership" with Live Nation Entertainment.
