= Guy Lafleur Award of Excellence =

The Guy Lafleur Award of Excellence (French: Prix d'excellence Guy-Lafleur) is presented annually to hockey players at the amateur level who "best combined hockey performances with academic excellence". First presented in 1985, the award is intended to encourage sports and academic excellence for amateur hockey players who compete for a Quebec team of the Canadian Interuniversity Sports (CIS), or in the Quebec Major Junior Hockey League (QMJHL). An additional "Merit" award was also presented annually to a Quebec Junior AAA Hockey League player; starting in 2015, this was changed to a player in the CEGEP league.

Winners are selected by a jury made of the hockey and education communities, and representatives from the sports media. Recipients of the Guy Lafleur Award of Excellence earns a $6,000 scholarship (over a three-year period), while the winner of the Guy Lafleur Award of Merit is given a $1,000 scholarship.

The first winner of the CIS award was left winger Paul Gagné of UQAC. Through 2015, 17 of the 31 CIS winners have been players from McGill. Notable winners of the award have included NHL coach Guy Boucher and left winger Mathieu Darche.

The award is named in honour of Guy Lafleur.
