= Quebec Route 340 =

Highway in Quebec, Canada

Route 340

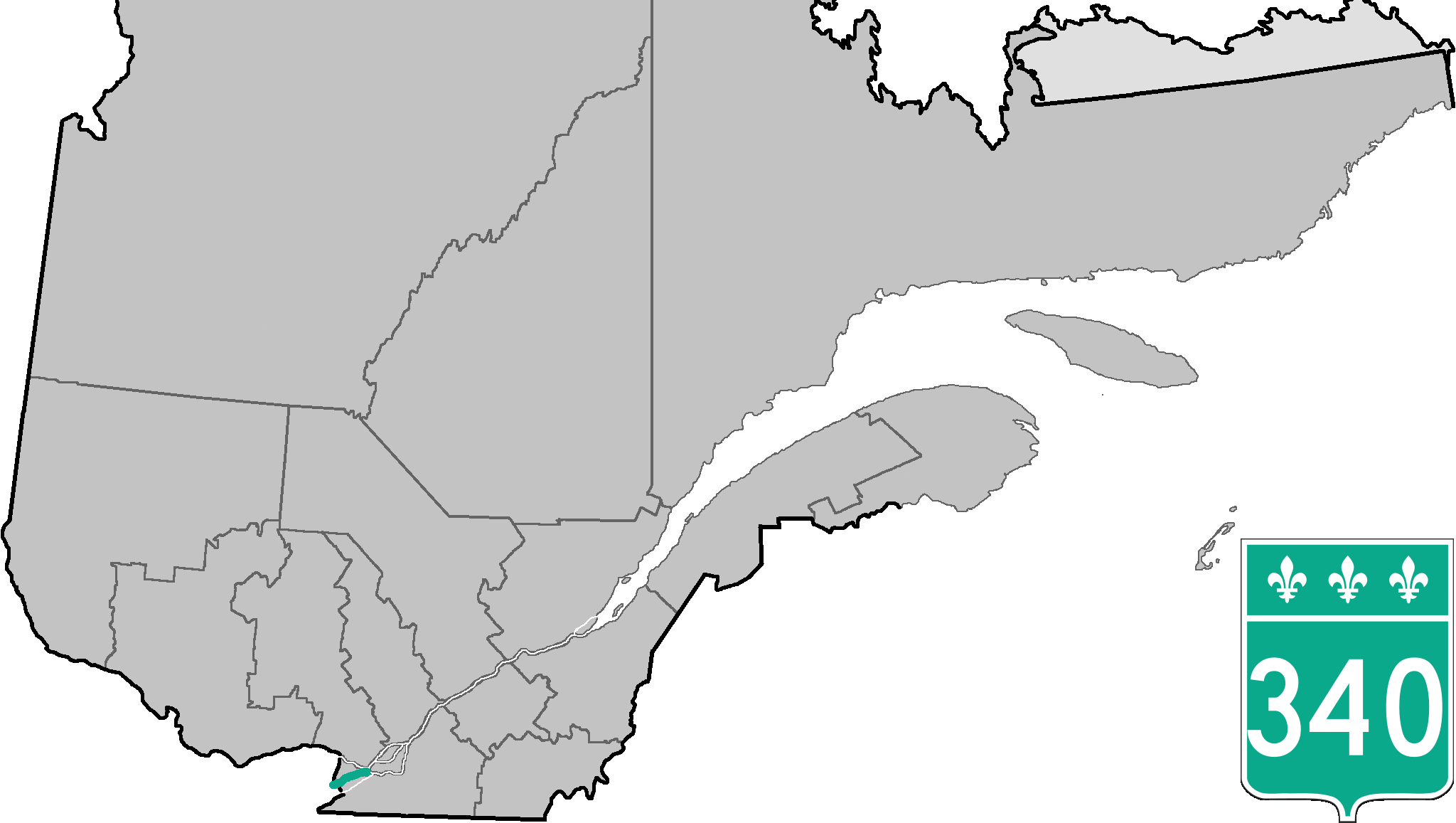

Route information
- Maintained by Transports Québec
- Length: 40.2 km (25.0 mi)

Major junctions
- West end: County Road 18 at South Glengarry, Ontario
- R-325 in Saint-Telesphore; R-201 in Saint-Clet; R-342 in Vaudreuil-Dorion; A-30 in Vaudreuil-Dorion
- East end: A-20 in Vaudreuil-Dorion

Location
- Country: Canada
- Province: Quebec

Highway system
- Quebec provincial highways; Autoroutes; List; Former
← R-339	→ R-341

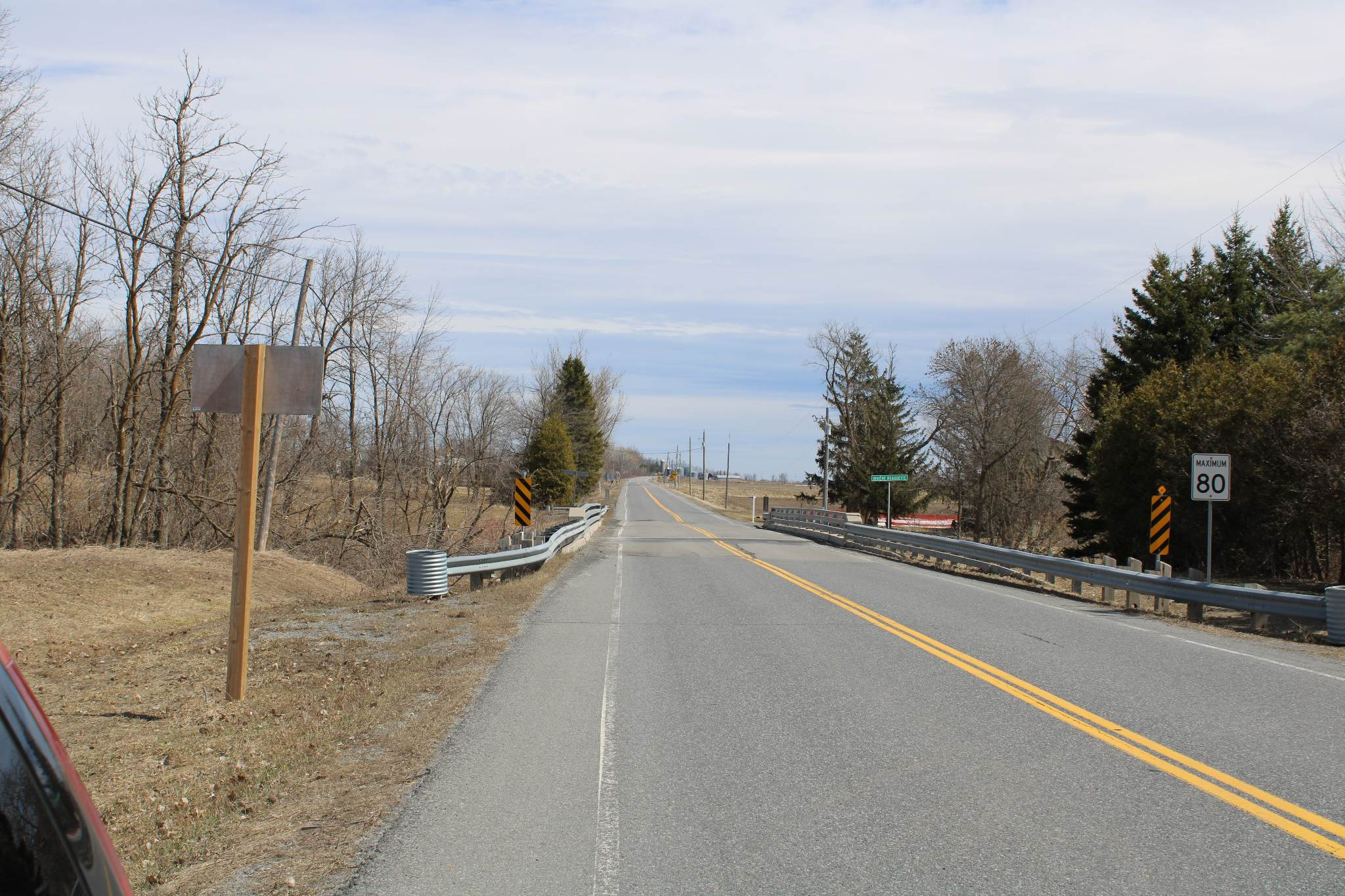
The route 340 from Ontario toward Saint-Télesphore

Route 340 is a provincial highway situated in the Montérégie region of Quebec west of Montreal. It runs for just over 40 kilometers from the Ontario-Quebec border in Saint-Télesphore (as a continuation of Stormont, Dundas and Glengarry County Road 18) and ends in Vaudreuil-Dorion at the junction of Autoroute 20.

== Municipalities along Route 340 ==
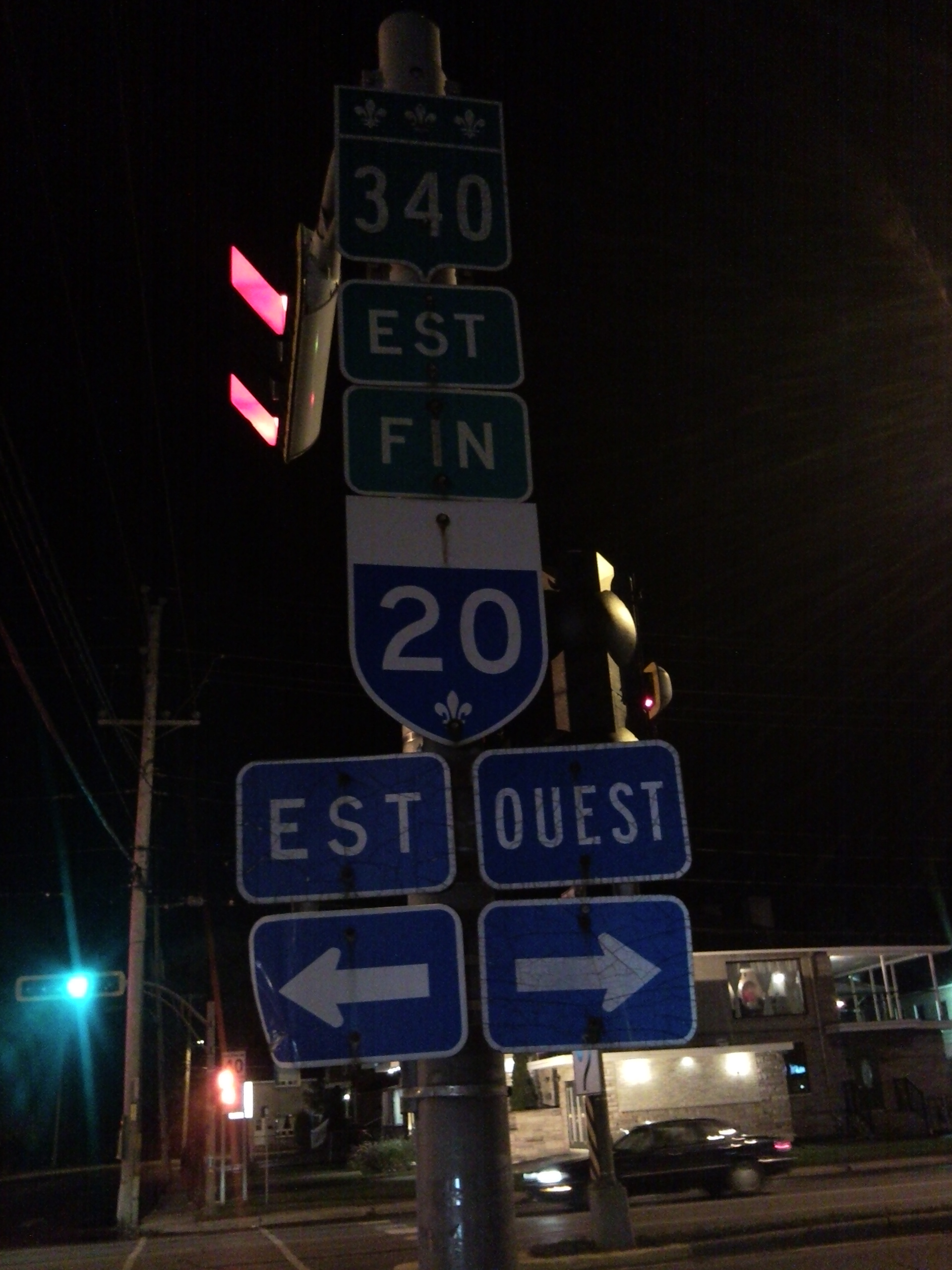
A 2011 photo for the eastern terminal of Route 340 in Vaudreuil-Dorion installed during the city's former Dorion days prior to the Vaudreuil-Dorion merger of 1994.

- Saint-Télesphore
- Saint-Polycarpe
- Sainte-Justine-de-Newton
- Saint-Clet
- Les Cèdres
- Saint-Lazare
- Vaudreuil-Dorion

== Major intersections ==
RCM or ET	Municipality	Km	Junction	Notes
Western terminus of Route 340
Vaudreuil-Soulanges	Sainte-Télesphore	0.0	Ontario County Road 18	WEST: to South Glengarry, Ontario
Vaudreuil-Soulanges	Sainte-Télesphore	2.8	R-325	325 SOUTH: to Rivière-Beaudette; 325 NORTH: to Sainte-Justine-de-Newton
Vaudreuil-Soulanges	Saint-Polycarpe	12.1	Chemin Sainte-Catherine	SOUTH: to Saint-Zotique
Vaudreuil-Soulanges	Saint-Polycarpe	15.0	Chemin Ranger	SOUTH: to Les Coteaux
Vaudreuil-Soulanges	Saint-Clet	21.0	R-201	201 SOUTH: to Coteau-du-Lac; 201 NORTH: to Hudson
Vaudreuil-Soulanges	Vaudreuil-Dorion	34.3	R-342	342 SOUTH: to Vaudreuil-Dorion; 342 NORTH: to Hudson
Vaudreuil-Soulanges	Vaudreuil-Dorion	34.8; 35.2	A-30	30 SOUTH: to A-20; 30 NORTH: to A-40 (TCH)
Vaudreuil-Soulanges	Vaudreuil-Dorion	40.1; 40.2	A-20	20 WEST: to Les Cèdres; 20 EAST: to Pincourt
Eastern terminus of Route 340

== See also ==
- List of Quebec provincial highways
