= Quebec Route 325 =

Highway in Quebec, Canada

Route 325

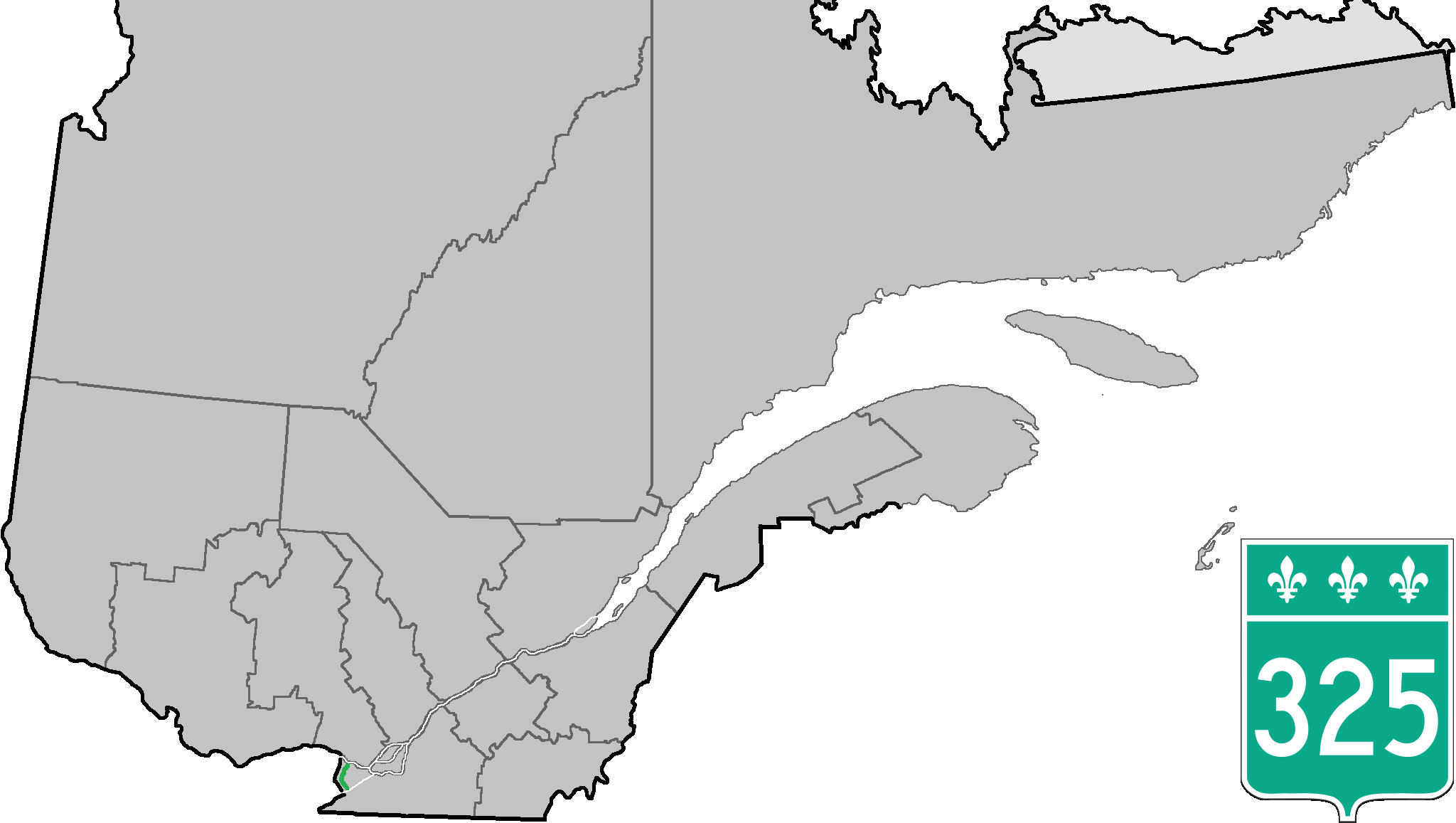

Route information
- Maintained by Transports Québec
- Length: 42.0 km (26.1 mi)

Major junctions
- South end: R-338 in Rivière-Beaudette
- A-20 in Rivière-Beaudette; R-340 in Saint-Télesphore
- North end: R-342 in Rigaud

Location
- Country: Canada
- Province: Quebec
- Major cities: Rigaud, Rivière-Beaudette

Highway system
- Quebec provincial highways; Autoroutes; List; Former
← R-323	→ R-327

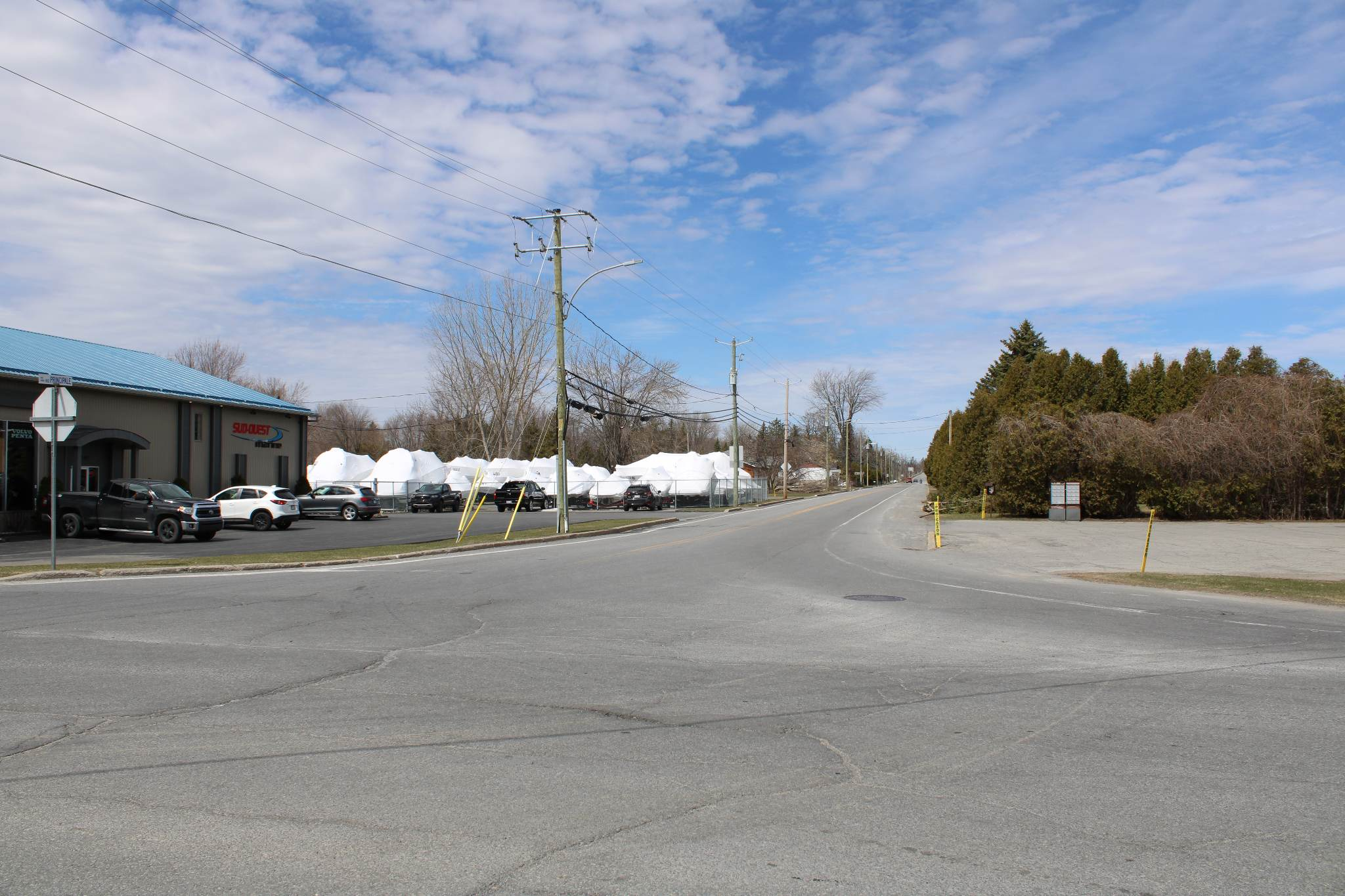
L'intersection de la 325 et 338, avec vue sur la 325

Route 325 is a Quebec provincial highway located in the Montérégie region near the Ontario-Quebec border. The 43-kilometer highway runs from south to north from Rivière-Beaudette at the junction of Route 338 (just south of Autoroute 20) to Rigaud at the junction of Route 342.

== Municipalities along Route 325 ==
- Rivière-Beaudette
- Saint-Télesphore
- Sainte-Justine-de-Newton
- Très-Saint-Rédempteur
- Rigaud

== Major intersections ==
RCM or ET	Municipality	Km	Junction	Notes
Southern terminus of Route 325
Vaudreuil-Soulanges	Rivière-Beaudette	0.0	R-338	338 WEST: to South Glengarry, Ontario; 338 EAST: to Saint-Zotique
Vaudreuil-Soulanges	Rivière-Beaudette	0.6; 0.9	A-20	20 EAST: to Saint-Zotique; 20 WEST: to South Glengarry, Ontario
Vaudreuil-Soulanges	Saint-Télesphore	10.6	R-340	340 WEST: to South Glengarry, Ontario; 340 EAST: to Saint-Polycarpe
Vaudreuil-Soulanges	Sainte-Justine-de-Newton	21.2	Chemin Bedard	WEST: to North Glengarry, Ontario
Vaudreuil-Soulanges	Très-Saint-Rédempteur	31.0	Chemin du Ruban	WEST: to East Hawkesbury, Ontario
Vaudreuil-Soulanges	Rigaud	42.0	R-342	342 WEST: to Pointe-Fortune; 342 EAST: to Saint-Lazare
Northern terminus of Route 325

== See also ==
- List of Quebec provincial highways
