= Quebec Route 342 =

Highway in Quebec, Canada

Route 342

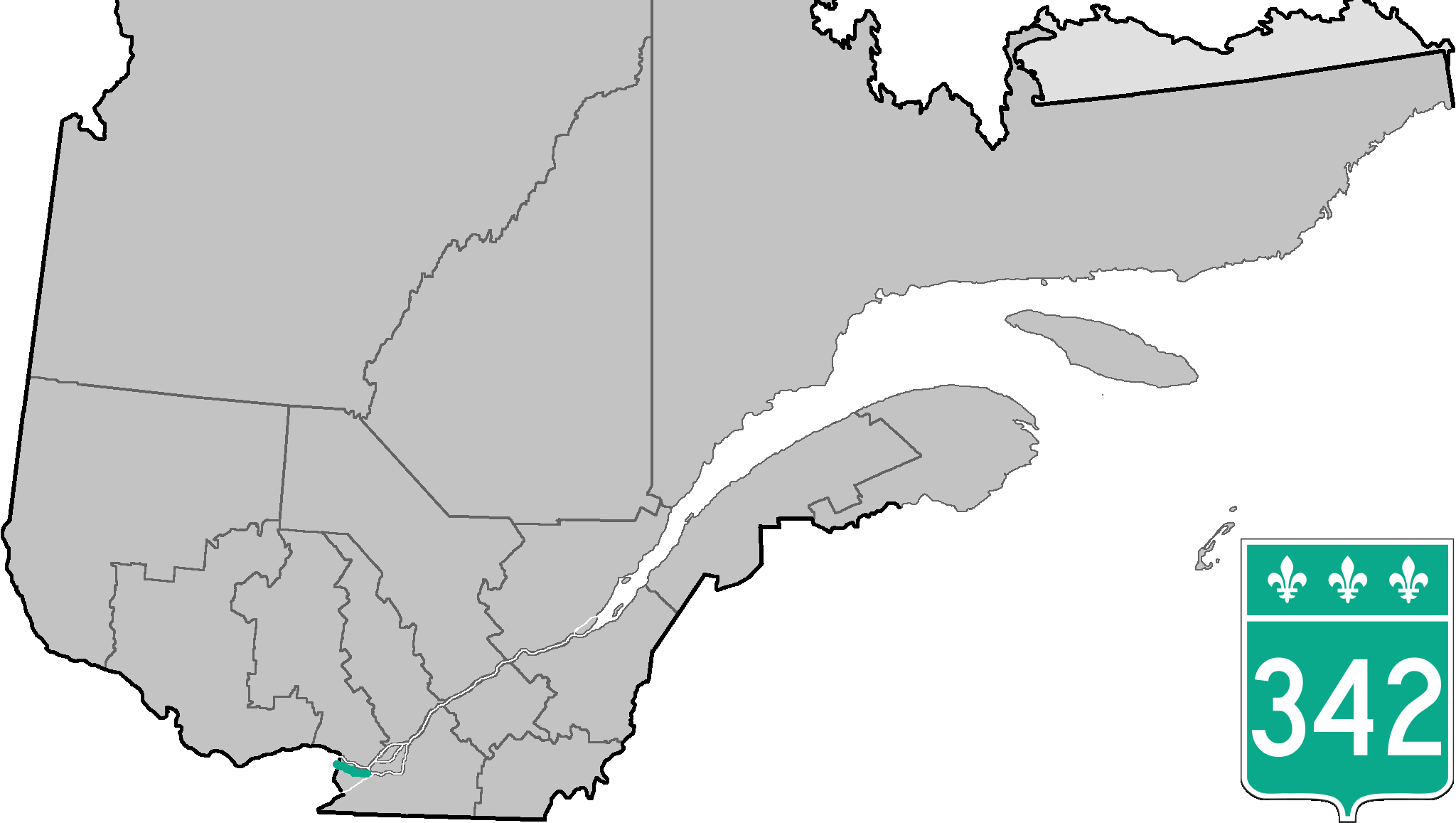

Route information
- Maintained by Transports Québec
- Length: 36.5 km (22.7 mi)

Major junctions
- West end: Chemin Grande Montée in Pointe-Fortune
- A-40 (TCH) in Pointe-Fortune; A-40 (TCH) / R-325 in Rigaud; A-40 (TCH) / R-201 in Hudson; A-40 (TCH) in Saint-Lazare; R-340 in Vaudreuil-Dorion
- East end: A-20 in Vaudreuil-Dorion

Location
- Country: Canada
- Province: Quebec
- Major cities: Rigaud, Hudson, Vaudreuil-Dorion

Highway system
- Quebec provincial highways; Autoroutes; List; Former
← R-341	→ R-343

Route 342 is a provincial highway located in the Montérégie region of Quebec west of Montreal. It runs from the Ontario-Quebec border in Pointe-Fortune (at the junctions of Ontario Highway 417 and Autoroute 40 and ends in Vaudreuil-Dorion at the junction of Autoroute 20. Before the construction of Autoroute 40 in 1959 (and its continuation in Ontario as Highway 417) it was the main route between Montreal, Quebec and Ottawa, Ontario (becoming Route 17 in Ontario). It serves as an alternate route to Autoroute 40 and has 4 interchanges with it in Pointe-Fortune, Rigaud and Hudson.

== Municipalities along Route 342 ==
- Pointe-Fortune
- Rigaud
- Hudson
- Saint-Lazare
- Vaudreuil-Dorion

== Major intersections ==
RCM or ET	Municipality	Km	Junction	Notes
Western terminus of Route 342
Vaudreuil-Soulanges	Pointe-Fortune	0.0	Chemin Grande Montée (Prescott-Russell County Road 14)	SOUTH: to East Hawkesbury, Ontario and A-40 (TCH) EAST (Exit 1), Montreal; NORTH: to Pointe-Fortune
Vaudreuil-Soulanges	Pointe-Fortune	0.4	A-40 (TCH) (Exit 1)	40 WEST: to Highway 417 / TCH and East Hawkesbury, Ontario
Vaudreuil-Soulanges	Pointe-Fortune	2.3	Chemin des Outaouais	NORTH: to Pointe-Fortune
Vaudreuil-Soulanges	Rigaud	8.1; 8.9	A-40 (TCH) (Exit 9)	40 EAST: to Montreal; 40 WEST: to Pointe-Fortune
Vaudreuil-Soulanges	Rigaud	9.9	R-325 (North end)	325 SOUTH: to Très-Saint-Rédempteur
Vaudreuil-Soulanges	Rigaud	11.1; 11.4	A-40 (TCH) (Exit 12)	40 EAST: to Montreal; 40 WEST: to Pointe-Fortune
Vaudreuil-Soulanges	Rigaud	16.6	R-201	201 SOUTH: to Salaberry-de-Valleyfield; 201 NORTH: to Hudson
Vaudreuil-Soulanges	Hudson	21.6	Cote-Saint-Charles	SOUTH: to A-40 (TCH) (Exit 22) & Saint-Lazare
Vaudreuil-Soulanges	Vaudreuil-Dorion	26.4	Chemin Daoust	SOUTH: to A-40 (TCH) (Exit 26-E) & Saint-Lazare
Vaudreuil-Soulanges	Vaudreuil-Dorion	27.3	A-40 (TCH) (Exit 26-W)	40 EAST: to Montreal
Vaudreuil-Soulanges	Vaudreuil-Dorion	32.1	R-340	340 EAST: to Vaudreuil-Dorion; 340 WEST: to Saint-Lazare
Vaudreuil-Soulanges	Vaudreuil-Dorion	36.4; 36.5	A-20	20 WEST: to Rivière-Beaudette; 20 EAST: to Montreal
Eastern terminus of Route 342

== See also ==
- List of Quebec provincial highways
