= Saint-Zotique =

- City
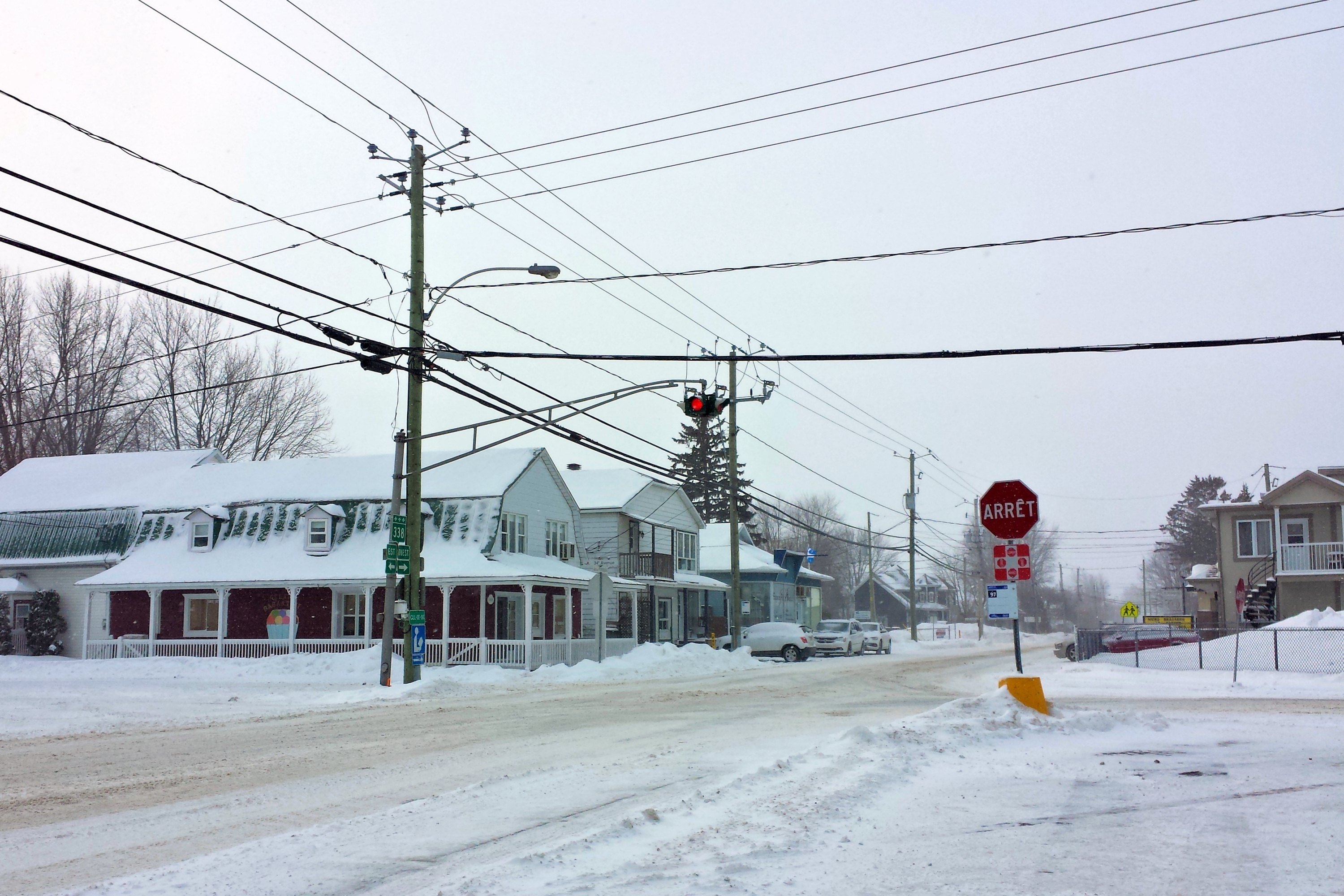
- Road 338

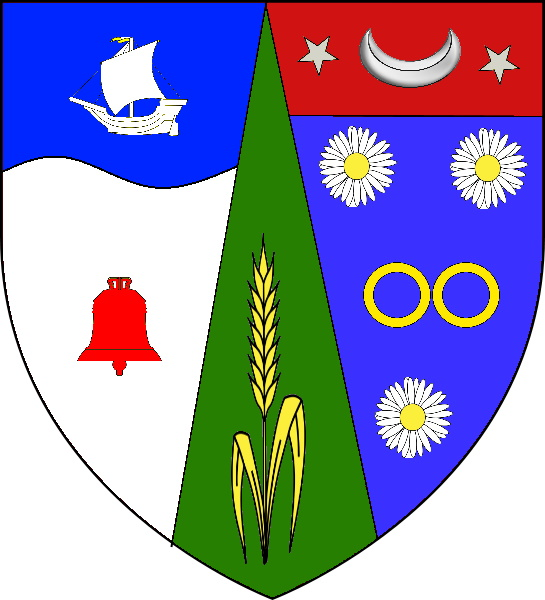
- Coat of arms
- Motto: Vivons heureux (Let's live happily)
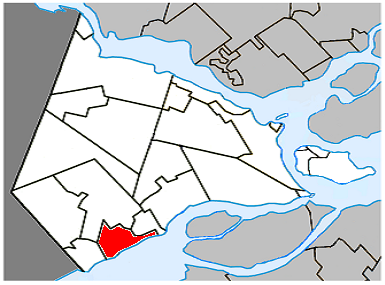
- Location within Vaudreuil-Soulanges RCM

- Location in southern Quebec
- Coordinates: 45°15′N 74°15′W
- Country: Canada
- Province: Quebec
- Region: Montérégie
- RCM: Vaudreuil-Soulanges
- Constituted: 27 May 1967

Government
  - Type: Saint-Zotique City Council
  - Mayor: Jean-Pierre Daoust
  - Federal riding: Beauharnois—Salaberry—Soulanges—Huntingdon
  - Prov. riding: Soulanges

Area
  - City: 50.10 km^{2} (19.34 sq mi)
  - Land: 25.04 km^{2} (9.67 sq mi)
  - Urban: 18.13 km^{2} (7.00 sq mi)

Population (2021)
  - City: 9,618
  - Density: 384/km^{2} (990/sq mi)
  - Urban: 19,582
  - Urban density: 1,080.2/km^{2} (2,798/sq mi)
  - Pop 2016-2021: ▲21.2%
  - Dwellings: 4,164
- Time zone: UTC−5 (EST)
  - Summer (DST): UTC−4 (EDT)
- Postal code(s): J0P 1Z0
- Area codes: 450 and 579
- Highways A-20: R-338
- Website: www.st-zotique.com

Saint-Zotique (French pronunciation: [sɛ̃zɔtik], locally [ˌsẽzɔˈt͡sɪk]) is a city located within the Vaudreuil-Soulanges Regional County Municipality in the Montérégie region located about 45 minutes west of Montreal, Quebec, Canada. It is named for Saint Zoticus of Comana.

The city resides on the north shore of the St. Lawrence River and Lake Saint Francis and along the Quebec City–Windsor Corridor, the most populated area in Canada.

== History ==
The first economic activities in the region started in the mid-18th century with forest exploitation and agriculture. The place was first named "Concession-du-Lac" and "Lac-Saint-François" after the adjacent lake. Subsequently, it was also known as "Longueuil-sur-le-Lac" (because it was part of the seigneury of New Longueuil, and "Moulin-Biron" (named after the owner of the first sawmill built near the wharf).

Saint-Zotique officially became parish near 1849 when it was separated from the parish of Saint-Polycarpe located a few kilometres to the north. In 1854, its post office opened, and a year later in 1855, the Parish Municipality of Saint-Zotique was formed.

In 1913, the village itself split off from the parish municipality to form the Village Municipality of Saint-Zotique, and eventually the two municipalities merged again to form a new village municipality in 1967. On 4 April 2009, it changed its status to just municipality and in 2023, it became a city.

== Geography ==
The southern part of the municipality is bordered by the St. Lawrence River, which flows eastward. Autoroute 20 crosses it from west to east.

== Demographics ==
Canada census – Saint-Zotique community profile

	2021	2016	2011
Population	9,618 (21.2% from 2016)	7,934 (17.1% from 2011)	6,773 (+29.0% from 2006)
Land area	25.04 km^{2} (9.67 sq mi)	25.10 km^{2} (9.69 sq mi)	25.19 km^{2} (9.73 sq mi)
Population density	384.0/km^{2} (995/sq mi)	316.1/km^{2} (819/sq mi)	268.8/km^{2} (696/sq mi)
Median age	41.2 (M: 40.8, F: 42.0)	38.7 (M: 38.8, F: 38.7)	37.9 (M: 38.0, F: 37.9)
Private dwellings	4,164 (total)	3,365 (total)	2,893 (total)
Median household income	$87,000	$74,903	$66,171

References: 2021 2016 2011

Historical Census Data - Saint-Zotique, Quebec

Year	Pop.	±%
1921	314	—
1931	216	−31.2%
1941	214	−0.9%
1951	243	+13.6%
1956	307	+26.3%
1961	370	+20.5%
1966	392	+5.9%
1971	1,243	+217.1%
1976	1,519	+22.2%

Year	Pop.	±%
1981	1,774	+16.8%
1986	2,025	+14.1%
1991	2,515	+24.2%
1996	3,683	+46.4%
2001	4,158	+12.9%
2006	5,251	+26.3%
2011	6,773	+29.0%
2016	7,934	+17.1%
2021	9,618	+21.2%

Source: Statistics Canada

=== Language ===
Canada Census Mother Tongue - Saint-Zotique, Quebec
Census	Total	French			English			French & English			Other		
Year	Responses	Count	Trend	Pop %	Count	Trend	Pop %	Count	Trend	Pop %	Count	Trend	Pop %
2021	9,620	8,530	▲16.3%	88.9%	580	▲68.1%	6.2%	160	▲146.2%	1.7%	285	▲72.2%	2.9%
2016	7,935	7,335	▲16.5%	92.4%	345	▲18.0%	4.4%	65	0.0%	0.8%	165	▲153.8%	2.1%
2011	6,760	6,295	▲21.1%	93.1%	300	▲43.3%	4.4%	65	▲30.8%	1.0%	100	▲25.0%	1.5%
2006	5,255	4,965	▲19.8%	94.5%	170	▲20.6%	3.2%	45	▲44.4%	0.9%	75	▲86.7%	1.4%
2001	4,150	3,980	▲14.1%	95.9%	135	▼6.9%	3.3%	25	▼58.3%	0.6%	10	▼77.8%	0.2%
1996	3,670	3,420	n/a	93.2%	145	n/a	4.0%	60	n/a	1.6%	45	n/a	1.2%

== Attractions ==
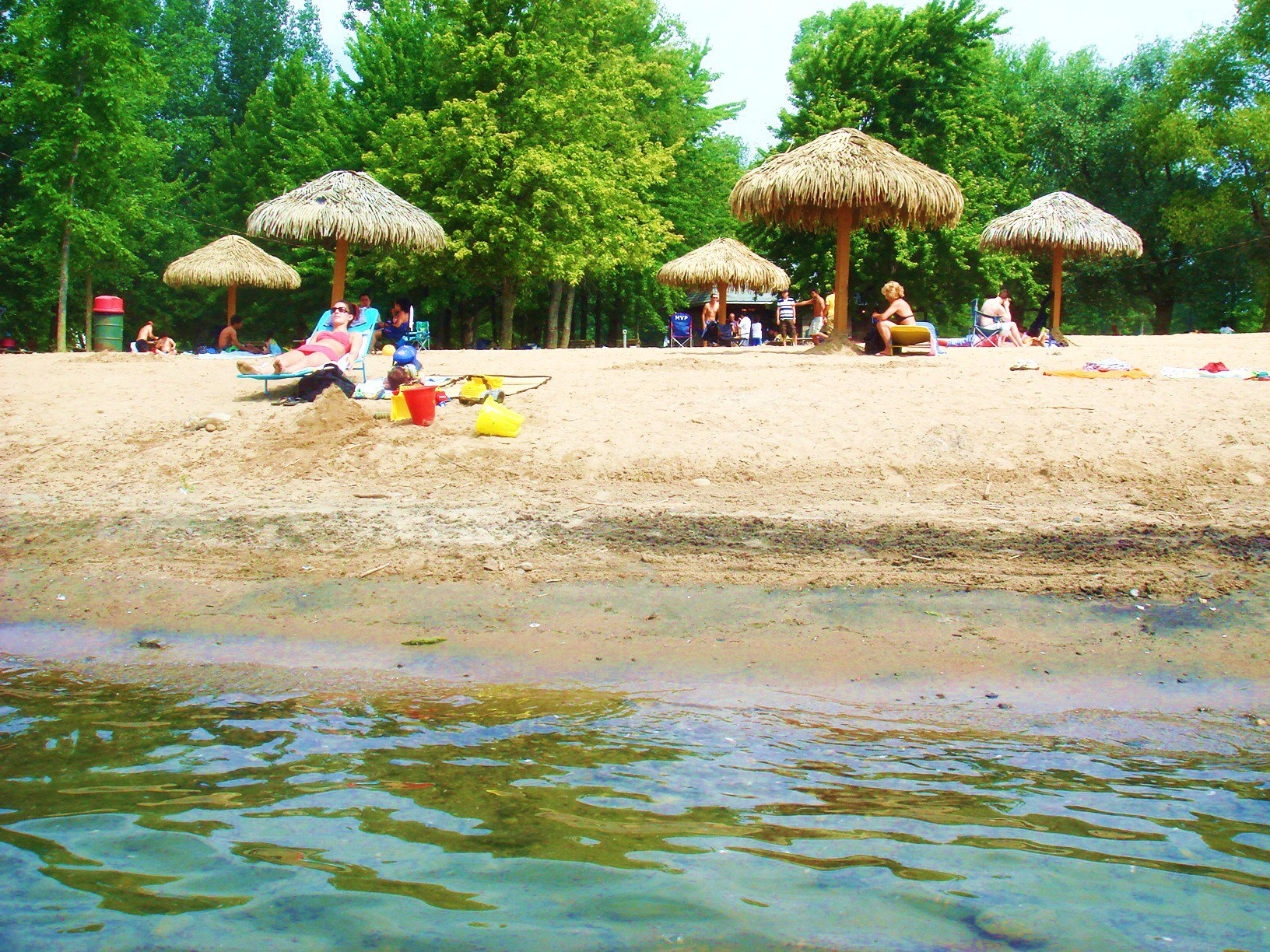
St-Zotique beach

The town is home to a popular beach which can accommodate as many as 10,000 people. Located on Lac Saint-François, nautical sports are among the region's most popular activities and the town also has a golf course.

== Government ==
Saint-Zotique federal election results
Year	Liberal		Conservative		Bloc Québécois		New Democratic		Green	
2021	28%	1,278	17%	794	44%	2,024	7%	304	0%	0
2019	29%	1,333	9%	405	49%	2,230	8%	340	3%	140
2015	31%	953	10%	307	31%	945	25%	769	2%	51
2011	7%	186	10%	259	31%	813	49%	1,266	3%	76
2008	15%	348	17%	394	55%	1,260	10%	222	2%	56
2006	15%	318	23%	495	56%	1,199	4%	87	3%	58
2004	29%	570	7%	146	58%	1,131	2%	47	2%	48

Saint-Zotique provincial election results
Year	CAQ		Liberal		QC solidaire		Parti Québécois	
2022	49%	1,632	9%	309	14%	461	15%	506
2018	50%	2,284	20%	902	13%	605	13%	610
2014	0%	0	41%	1,511	12%	438	42%	1,558
2012	30%	921	23%	700	3%	94	41%	1,249

Saint-Zotique forms part of the federal electoral district of Beauharnois—Salaberry—Soulanges—Huntingdon and has been represented by Claude DeBellefeuille of the Bloc Québécois since 2019. Provincially, Saint-Zotique is part of the Soulanges electoral district and is represented by Marilyne Picard of the Coalition Avenir Québec since 2018.

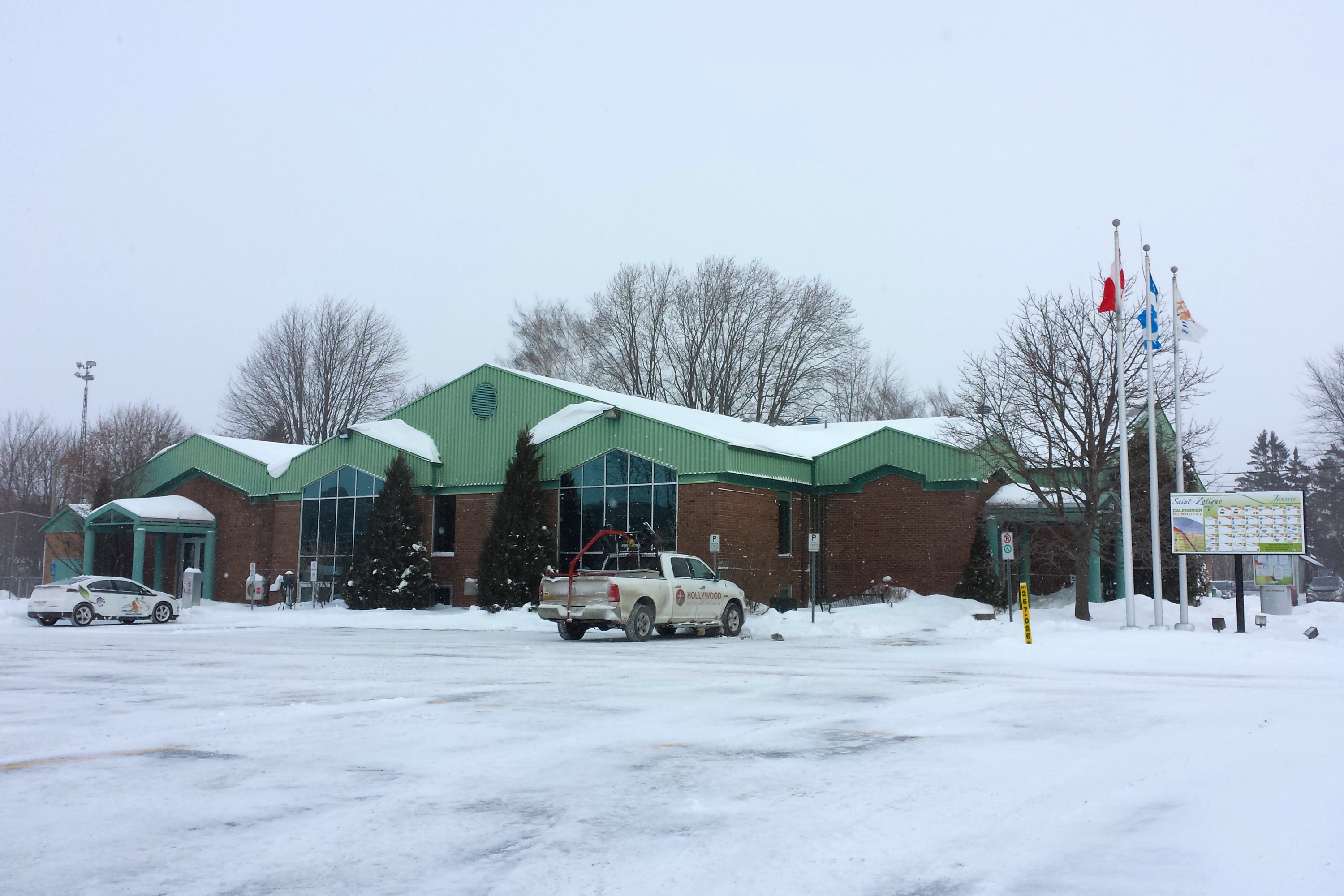
Town hall of St-Zotique

List of former mayors:

- Firmin François Liénard (1913–1915)
- Joseph Arsène Adolphe Bray (1916, 1931–1933)
- Joseph Omer Alphonse Méthot (1916–1917)
- Henri-Pie-Marie-Joseph-Alfred La Rocque (1917–1921)
- Jean Baptiste Sauvé (1921–1925)
- Josephat Léger (1925–1929)
- Hilaire Duval (1929–1931, 1933–1935)
- Joseph François d'Assise Adrien Cadieux (1935)
- Joseph Joachim Eugène Bissonnette (1935)
- Pierre Montpetit (1935)
- Albert Rochon (1935–1939)
- Joseph Tancrède Asselin (1939–1942)
- Cyrille Joseph Albert Richer Laflèche (1942, 1944)
- Louis Julien Bergevin (1942–1944)
- Joseph-Wilfrid-Godefroi Blanchard (1944–1971)
- Joseph Alfred Jacques Claude Blanchard (1971–1985)
- Joseph-Wilfrid-Maurice-Yvon Leroux (1985–1998)
- Robert Hovington (1998–2005)
- Gaëtane Legault (2005–2013)
- Yvon Chiasson (2013–2025)
- Jean-Pierre Daoust (2025–present)

== Infrastructure ==
=== Transportation ===
Located on Route 338 and just south of Autoroute 20 near the Ontario-Quebec border, it is easily accessible from the busiest transportation corridor of the country with direct links to Montreal, Cornwall and Toronto.

== Education ==
Commission Scolaire des Trois-Lacs operates Francophone schools.

- École de la Riveraine
- École des Orioles
- École Saint-Zotique
- École Virginie-Roy
- 2^{e} Avenue is zoned to École Léopold-Carrière in Les Coteaux

Lester B. Pearson School Board operates Anglophone schools.

- Soulanges Elementary School in Saint-Télesphore or Evergreen Elementary and Forest Hill Elementary (Junior Campus and Senior campus) in Saint-Lazare

== See also ==
- List of cities in Quebec
