= Vaudreuil-Soulanges Regional County Municipality =

Vaudreuil-Soulanges
- Regional county municipality
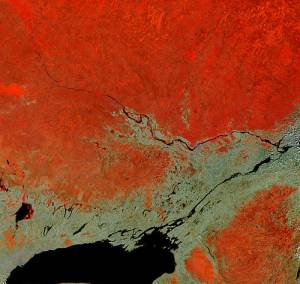
- Vaudreuil-Soulanges is at the triangle (centre right) formed west of the confluence of the Ottawa and Saint Lawrence River rivers in this satellite image.

- Location in province of Quebec.
- Coordinates: 45°21′N 74°13′W
- Country: Canada
- Province: Quebec
- Region: Montérégie
- Effective: April 14, 1982
- County seat: Vaudreuil-Dorion

Government
  - Type: Prefecture
  - Prefect: Patrick Bousez

Area
  - Total: 1,019.70 km^{2} (393.71 sq mi)
  - Land: 855.56 km^{2} (330.33 sq mi)

Population (2016)
  - Total: 149,349
  - Density: 174.6/km^{2} (452/sq mi)
  - Change 2011-2016: ▲7.2%
  - Dwellings: 59,474
- Time zone: UTC−5 (EST)
  - Summer (DST): UTC−4 (EDT)
- Area codes: 450 and 579
- Website: www.mrcvs.ca

Vaudreuil-Soulanges (French pronunciation: [vodʁœj sulɑ̃ʒ]) is a regional county municipality in Quebec, Canada. It is located on a triangular peninsula in the western Montérégie region of Quebec, formed by the confluence of the Ottawa River to the north, and the St. Lawrence River to the south. Ontario is located west of here.

== Geography ==
Vaudreuil-Soulanges is part of the St Lawrence Valley. Two million years ago the region was subject to a series of glaciations that covered much of North America. The last in the series was the Wisconsin glaciation. The ice sheet weighed down the landscape. This created the depressions in the land that created the basins for Lake Saint-Louis, Lac des Deux-Montagnes and Lake Saint-Francis. As the ice sheet eroded, the region was mostly submerged 12,000 years ago by an inland saltwater sea known as the Champlain Sea. Once the glacier was melted, the land rose again, pushing the saltwater into the sea. 10,000 years ago the body of water, now a fresh water lake, has been named by scholars as Lake Lampsilis.

== History ==
During the French colonial period, the region of New France was divided into several seigneuries populated by French colonists.

- Seigneurie de L'Île-Perrot founded on October 29, 1672 (modern day L'Île-Perrot, Pincourt, Notre-Dame-de-L'Île-Perrot and Terrasse-Vaudreuil)
- Seigneurie de Vaudreuil founded on October 12, 1702 (modern day Vaudreuil-Dorion, Vaudreuil-sur-le-Lac, L'Île-Cadieux, Saint-Lazare and Hudson
- Seigneurie de Soulanges founded on October 12, 1702 (modern day Saint-Clet, Coteau-du-Lac, Les Cèdres and Pointe-des-Cascades)
- Seigneurie de Rigaud founded on October 29, 1732 (modern day Rigaud, Sainte-Marthe, Pointe-Fortune and Très-Saint-Rédempteur)
- Seigneurie de Nouvelle-Longueuil founded on April 21, 1734 (modern day Saint-Polycarpe, Saint-Télesphore, Saint-Zotique, Les Coteaux et Rivière-Beaudette)
- Canton Newton founded in August 1791 (modern day Sainte-Justine-de-Newton, not part of the seigneurie system, was modeled after British township system)

The seigneurial system was finally abolished in 1854, nearly a century after Great Britain took over the territory after defeating France in the Seven Years' War.

It is the only county in Quebec that lies both south of the Ottawa River and north of the St. Lawrence River. Great Britain wanted to keep most of the French-speaking, ethnic French population of the area within Lower Canada during the 1791 division of Upper and Lower Canada (precursors to the provinces of Ontario and Quebec). It is geographically isolated from the Montérégie region south of the St. Lawrence.

The name relates to the historical division of the area into two counties: Vaudreuil County -- (named after Pierre François de Rigaud, Marquis de Vaudreuil-Cavagnal, governor of New France) for the communities along the Ottawa River, and Soulanges County -- (named after Pierre-Jacques Joybert de Soulanges from Soulanges, Marne, France) for the communities along the St. Lawrence. Soulanges is a name of Québécois derivation, referring to its southerliness.

Since the RCM formation on 14 April 1982, the division of the county into "Vaudreuil" and "Soulanges" is still salient. The "Vaudreuil" area (consisting of the municipalities of Vaudreuil-Dorion, Saint-Lazare, Hudson, L'Île-Perrot, and others) is closer to Montreal. It is more suburban, populous, and economically and ethnically diverse. By contrast, the Soulanges area (including the municipalities of Saint-Polycarpe, Saint-Zotique, Coteau-du-Lac, Rivière-Beaudette and Les Coteaux) is predominantly rural, agricultural, and ethnically French-Canadian.

Owing to the county's geographic isolation within Quebec, and its growing population as a suburb of the city of Montreal, Elections Canada assigned the electoral district to the county in 1997.

== Subdivisions ==
There are 23 subdivisions within the RCM:

Cities & Towns (10)

- Coteau-du-Lac
- Hudson
- L'Île-Cadieux
- L'Île-Perrot
- Notre-Dame-de-l'Île-Perrot
- Pincourt
- Rigaud
- Saint-Lazare
- Saint-Zotique
- Vaudreuil-Dorion

Municipalities (11)

- Les Cèdres
- Les Coteaux
- Pointe-Fortune
- Rivière-Beaudette
- Saint-Clet
- Saint-Polycarpe
- Saint-Télesphore
- Sainte-Justine-de-Newton
- Sainte-Marthe
- Terrasse-Vaudreuil
- Très-Saint-Rédempteur

Villages (2)

- Pointe-des-Cascades
- Vaudreuil-sur-le-Lac

== Demographics ==
=== Population ===
Canada census – Vaudreuil-Soulanges Regional County Municipality community profile

	2016	2011
Population	149,349 (+7.2% from 2011)	139,353 (+15.7% from 2006)
Land area	855.36 km^{2} (330.26 sq mi)	855.36 km^{2} (330.26 sq mi)
Population density	174.6/km^{2} (452/sq mi)	162.9/km^{2} (422/sq mi)
Median age	40.7 (M: 40.3, F: 40.7)	39.2 (M: 38.9, F: 39.5)
Private dwellings	59,474 (total)	55,203 (total)
Median household income	$71,095	$71,095

References: 2016 2011

Historical Census Data - Vaudreuil-Soulanges Regional County Municipality

Year	Pop.	±%
1986	69,767	—
1991	84,503	+21.1%
1996	95,318	+12.8%

Year	Pop.	±%
2001	102,100	+7.1%
2006	120,935	+18.4%
2011	139,353	+15.2%

Year	Pop.	±%
2016	149,349	+7.2%
2021	162,600	+8.9%

=== Population History by County (1855–1981) ===
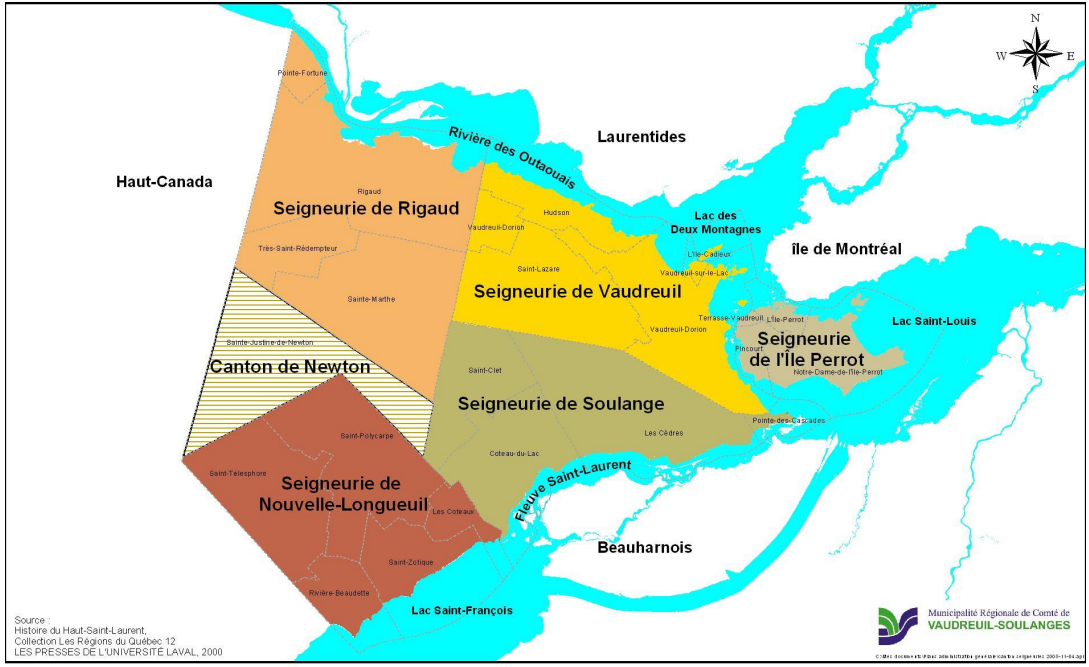
1700-1855 - Seigneuries Vaudreuil-Soulanges

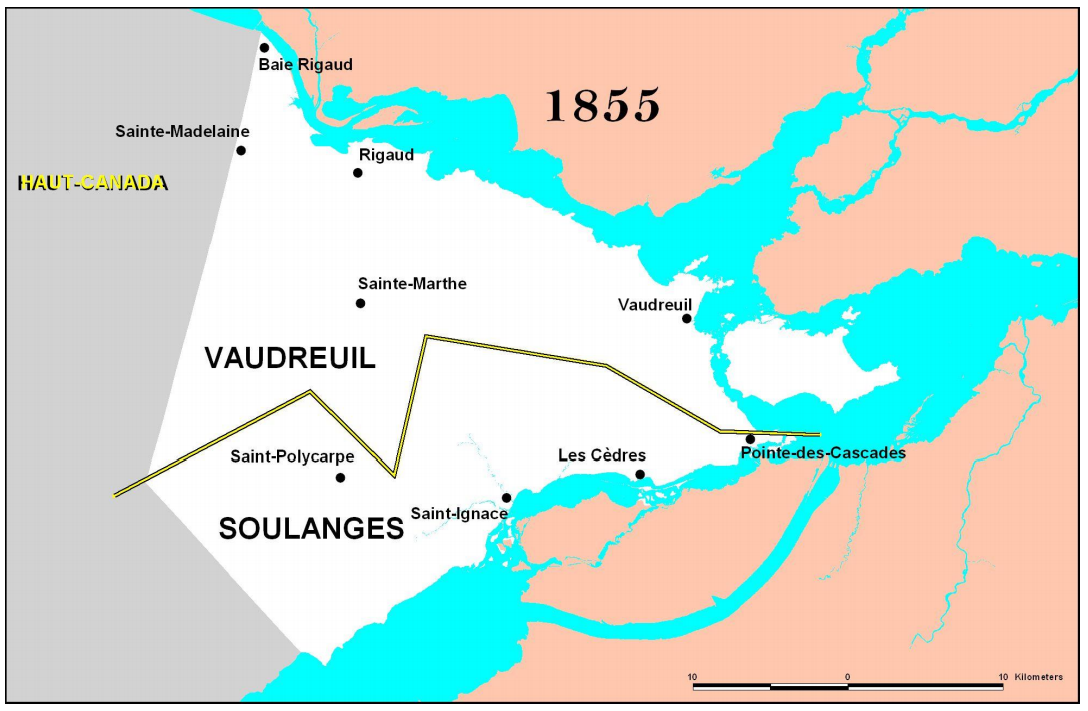
1855 - Vaudreuil-Soulanges

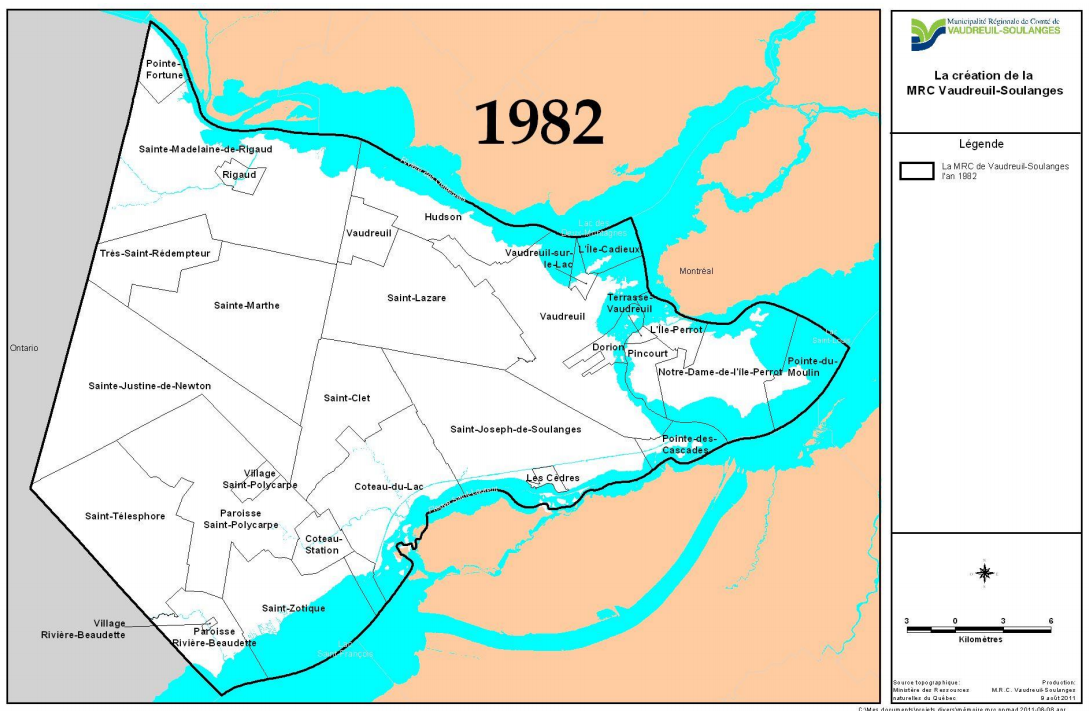
1982 - Vaudreuil-Soulanges

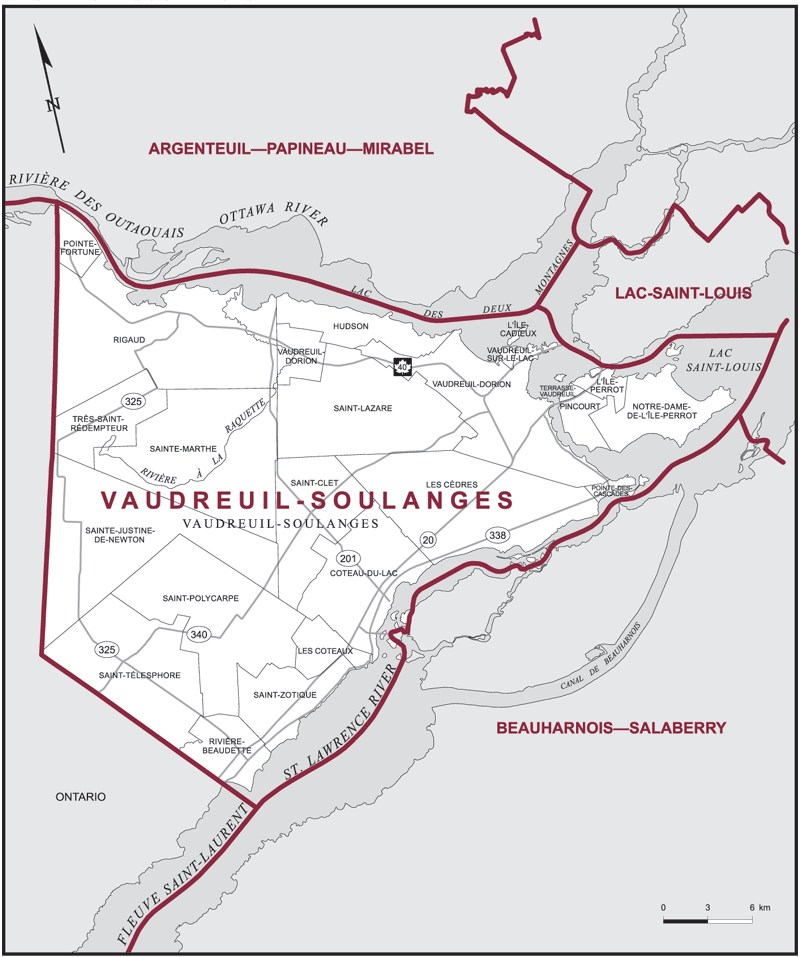

Population History by County, 1855-1981
Municipality	1871	1881	1891	1901	1911	1921	1931	1941	1951	1956	1961	1966	1971	1976	1981
Comté de Vaudreuil	11,003	11,485	10,792	10,445	11,039	11,555	12,015	13,170	17,378	22,625	28,681	34,053	36,593	44,257	50,043
Comté de Soulanges	10,808	10,220	9,608	9,928	9,400	10,065	9,099	9,328	9,233	9,736	10,075	10,757	11,449	13,254	15,429
Vaudreuil-Soulanges	21,811	21,705	20,400	20,373	20,439	21,620	21,114	22,498	26,611	32,361	38,756	44,810	48,042	57,511	65,472

=== Population History by Municipality ===
Population History by Municipality, 1986-2021
Municipality	1986	1991	1996	2001	2006	2011	2016	2021
Vaudreuil-Dorion	13,722	17,109	18,466	20,650	25,789	33,305	38,117	43,268
Saint-Lazare	5,065	9,055	11,193	12,895	17,016	19,215	19,889	22,354
Pincourt	9,121	9,749	10,023	10,155	11,197	14,305	14,558	14,751
L'Île-Perrot	6,586	8,065	9,178	9,063	9,927	10,503	10,756	11,638
Notre-Dame-de-l'Île-Perrot	4,325	5,261	7,059	8,737	9,885	10,620	10,654	11,427
Saint-Zotique	2,025	2,515	3,683	4,158	5,251	6,773	7,934	9,618
Rigaud	4,928	5,770	6,057	6,095	6,780	7,346	7,777	7,854
Coteau-du-Lac	3,550	4,193	4,960	5,684	6,346	6,842	7,044	7,473
Les Cèdres	3,320	3,836	4,641	5,128	5,732	6,079	6,777	7,184
Les Coteaux	2,290	2,613	2,843	3,297	3,764	4,568	5,368	5,643
Hudson	4,425	4,829	4,796	4,811	5,088	5,135	5,185	5,411
Rivière-Beaudette	1,045	1,292	1,381	1,464	1,720	1,885	2,097	2,489
Saint-Polycarpe	1,570	1,640	1,676	1,660	1,708	1,969	2,224	2,372
Terrasse-Vaudreuil	1,665	1,744	1,977	2,061	1,985	1,971	1,986	1,887
Pointe-des-Cascades	640	691	910	981	1,046	1,340	1,481	1,775
Saint-Clet	1,125	1,388	1,524	1,613	1,725	1,738	1,779	1,700
Vaudreuil-sur-le-Lac	675	876	928	964	1,290	1,359	1,341	1,361
Sainte-Marthe	1,055	1,056	1,090	1,094	1,080	1,075	1,097	1,014
Très-Saint-Rédempteur	480	570	622	598	733	863	898	978
Sainte-Justine-de-Newton	860	926	934	888	929	973	922	947
Saint-Télesphore	780	772	805	809	769	762	759	754
Pointe-Fortune	400	413	451	429	507	542	580	582
L'Île-Cadieux	115	140	121	127	128	105	126	120
Vaudreuil-Soulanges	69,767	84,503	95,318	103,361	120,395	137,429	149,349	162,600

=== Language ===
Canada Census Mother Tongue - Vaudreuil-Soulanges Regional County Municipality, Quebec
Census	Total	French			English			French & English			Other		
Year	Responses	Count	Trend	Pop %	Count	Trend	Pop %	Count	Trend	Pop %	Count	Trend	Pop %
2021	161,090	94,820	▼1.6%	58.87%	37,135	▲7.1%	23.05%	5,180	▲84.02%	3.21%	20,640	▲36.5%	12.81%
2016	148,605	96,365	▲3.3%	64.85%	32,525	▲14.17%	21.89%	2,815	▲14.2%	1.89%	15,120	▲32.1%	10.17%
2011	137,590	93,300	▲9.0%	67.81%	30,380	▲22.7%	22.08%	2,465	▲62.7%	1.79%	11,445	▲50.0%	8.32%
2006	119,465	85,565	▲11.7%	71.62%	24,760	▲26.2%	20.73%	1,515	▲18.8%	1.27%	7,625	▲101.2%	6.38%
2001	101,290	76,610	▲8.4%	75.63%	19,615	▲1.7%	19.37%	1,275	▲9.4%	1.26%	3,790	▲17.3%	3.74%
1996	94,370	70,690	n/a	74.91%	19,285	n/a	20.44%	1,165	n/a	1.23%	3,230	n/a	3.42%

== Transportation ==
=== Public Transportation ===
The region is served by the Exo La Presqu’Île and Exo Sud-Ouest bus services as well as the Vaudreuil-Hudson commuter rail line.

=== Access Routes ===
Highways and numbered routes that run through the municipality, including external routes that start or finish at the county border:

- Autoroutes
  - A-20
  - A-30
  - A-40 (TCH)
- Principal Highways
  - Developed in the future
- Secondary Highways
  - R-201
  - R-325
  - R-338
  - R-340
  - R-342
- External Routes
  - Highway 2
  - Highway 401
  - Highway 417 / TCH

== See also ==
- List of regional county municipalities and equivalent territories in Quebec
