= Les Coteaux, Quebec =

Les Coteaux
- Municipality
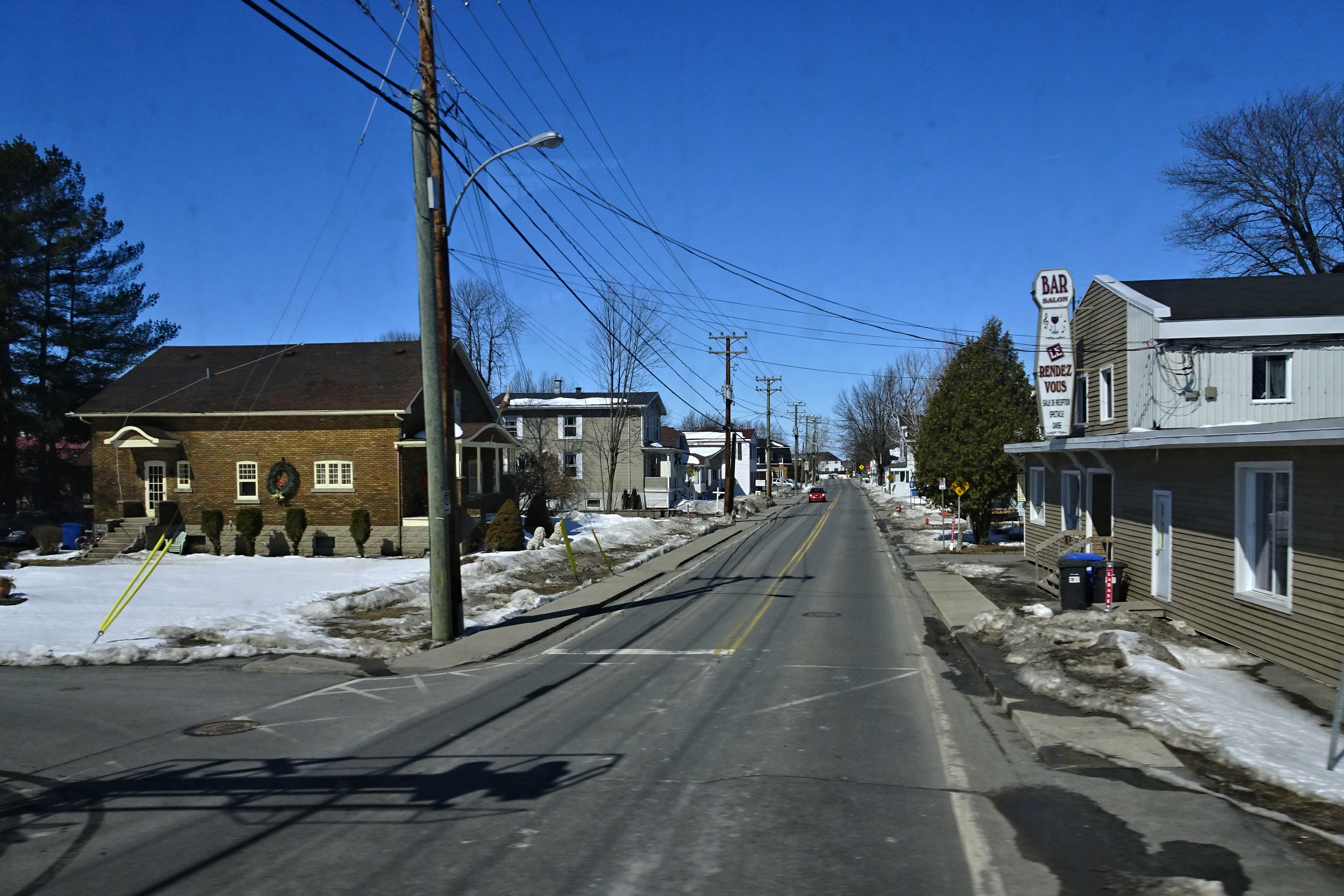
- Coteau-Station sector
- Motto: Un milieu où il fait bon vivre! (A great place to live!)
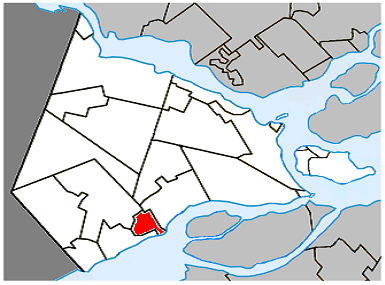
- Location within Vaudreuil-Soulanges RCM

- Location in southern Quebec
- Coordinates: 45°17′N 74°14′W
- Country: Canada
- Province: Quebec
- Region: Montérégie
- RCM: Vaudreuil-Soulanges
- Constituted: 18 May 1994

Government
  - Mayor: Sylvain Brazeau
  - Federal riding: Beauharnois—Salaberry—Soulanges—Huntingdon
  - Prov. riding: Soulanges

Area
  - Total: 14.50 km^{2} (5.60 sq mi)
  - Land: 11.64 km^{2} (4.49 sq mi)

Population (2021)
  - Total: 5,643
  - Density: 485/km^{2} (1,260/sq mi)
  - Pop 2016-2021: ▲5.1%
  - Dwellings: 2,453
- Time zone: UTC−5 (EST)
  - Summer (DST): UTC−4 (EDT)
- Postal code(s): J7X 1A2
- Area codes: 450 and 579
- Highways A-20: R-338
- Website: www.les-coteaux.qc.ca

Les Coteaux (French pronunciation: [le kɔto]) is a municipality in Vaudreuil-Soulanges Regional County Municipality in the Montérégie region of Quebec, Canada. It is located north of the Saint Lawrence River and Salaberry-de-Valleyfield.

It was formed from the merger in 1994 of Coteau-Station (north of Autoroute 20) and Coteau-Landing (south of Autoroute 20). Prior to 1985, Coteau-Station had been known as Station-du-Coteau.

== History ==
Coteau-Landing was the historic location at the upper end of rapids on the St. Lawrence River where canoeing and boating parties had to land in order to portage around the rapids. It was formerly called Anse-aux-Batteaux (English: Cove of Boats). At the end of the 17th century, a staging post was built there for voyageurs and fur traders. But it was not until 1771 that settlement really began.

In 1847, its post office opened under the English name "Coteau Landing". In 1853, the Village Municipality of Côteau Landing was created (orthography was later changed to "Coteau-Landing"). When Soulanges County was formed in 1855, the village became the county seat. When the Soulanges Canal was completed with Coteau-Landing as its western terminus, its economy was boosted by the presence of a lock and relay centre with quays and wharves. It also had a regular paddle steamer service to Salaberry-de-Valleyfield.

The Grand Trunk Railway was constructed in 1855 with a station just north of Coteau Landing, called Coteau Junction. In 1887, the Village Municipality of Station du Coteau was created out of territory ceded from Saint-Polycarpe. Its name was adjusted to La Station-du-Coteau, and renamed in 1984 to Coteau-Station.

In May 1994, the village municipalities of Coteau-Landing and Coteau-Station were amalgamated to form the Municipality of Coteaux (adjusted to Les Coteaux in June 1995).

== Demographics ==
Canada census – Les Coteaux community profile

	2021	2016	2011
Population	5,643 (+5.1% from 2016)	5,368 (+17.5% from 2011)	4,568 (+21.4% from 2006)
Land area	11.64 km^{2} (4.49 sq mi)	11.63 km^{2} (4.49 sq mi)	11.62 km^{2} (4.49 sq mi)
Population density	485/km^{2} (1,260/sq mi)	461.4/km^{2} (1,195/sq mi)	393.2/km^{2} (1,018/sq mi)
Median age	38.8 (M: 37.6, F: 40.0)	37.0 (M: 35.9, F: 37.9)	35.7 (M: 35.3, F: 36.2)
Private dwellings	2,453 (total) 2,411 (occupied)	2,285 (total)	1,931 (total)
Median household income	$79,500	$67,677	$60,437

References: 2021 2016 2011

Historical Census Data - Les Coteaux, Quebec

Year	Pop.	±%
1996	2,843	—
2001	3,010	+5.9%
2006	3,764	+25.0%

Year	Pop.	±%
2011	4,568	+21.4%
2016	5,368	+17.5%
2021	5,643	+5.1%

Source: Statistics Canada

=== Language ===
Canada Census Mother Tongue - Les Coteaux, Quebec
Census	Total	French			English			French & English			Other		
Year	Responses	Count	Trend	Pop %	Count	Trend	Pop %	Count	Trend	Pop %	Count	Trend	Pop %
2021	5,640	5,035	▲1.9%	89.3%	335	▲31.4%	5.9%	130	▲44.4%	2.3%	115	▲64.3%	2.0%
2016	5,570	4,940	▲17.2%	92.0%	255	▲15.9%	4.7%	90	▲80.0%	1.7%	70	▲55.6%	1.3%
2011	4,530	4,215	▲22.2%	93.05%	220	▲22.2%	4.86%	50	▼16.7%	1.10%	45	▲12.5%	0.99%
2006	3,730	3,450	▲21.3%	92.49%	180	▲100.0%	4.83%	60	▲500.0%	1.61%	40	▲166.7%	1.07%
2001	2,960	2,845	▲9.2%	96.11%	90	▼28.0%	3.04%	10	▲ n/a%	0.34%	15	▲50.0%	0.51%
1996	2,740	2,605	n/a	95.07%	125	n/a	4.56%	0	n/a	0.00%	10	n/a	0.37%

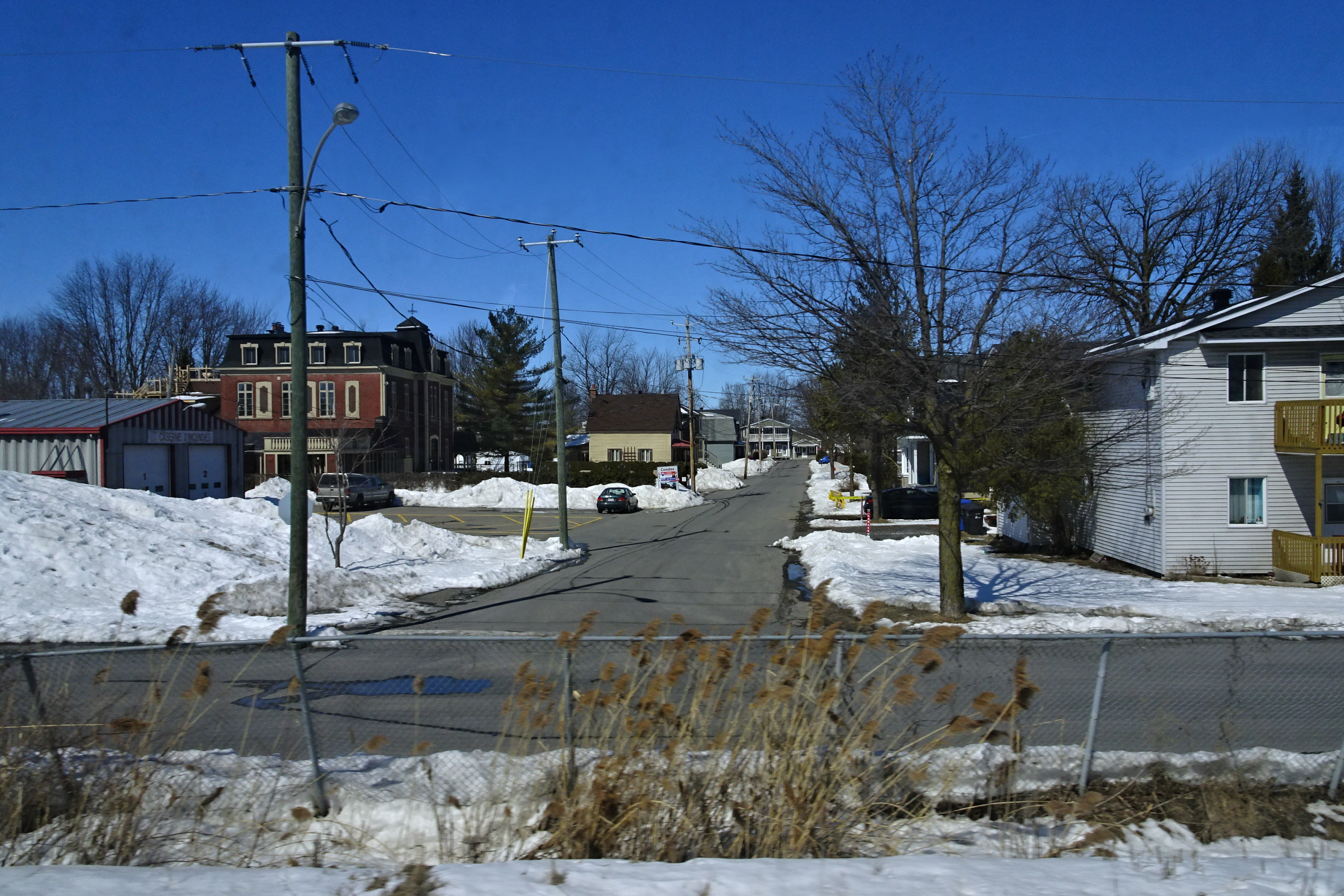
Coteau-Station

== Government ==
List of former mayors (since formation of current municipality):

- Réal Boisvert (1994–2013)
- Denise Godin Dostie (2013–2021)
- Sylvain Brazeau (2021–present)

== Education ==
Commission Scolaire des Trois-Lacs operates Francophone schools.

- École Léopold-Carrière

Lester B. Pearson School Board operates Anglophone schools.

- Soulanges Elementary School in Saint-Télesphore or Evergreen Elementary and Forest Hill Elementary (Junior Campus and Senior campus) in Saint-Lazare

== See also ==
- List of municipalities in Quebec
