= Pointe-Fortune =

- Municipality

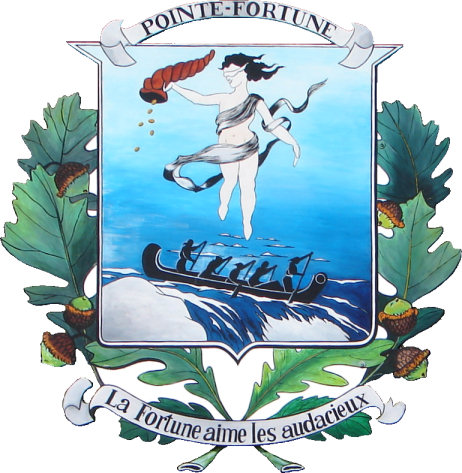
- Coat of arms
- Motto: La fortune aime les audacieux ("Fortune favours the bold")
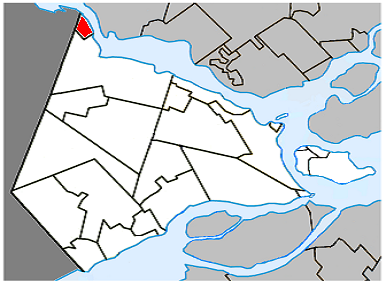
- Location within Vaudreuil-Soulanges RCM

- Location in southern Quebec
- Coordinates: 45°34′N 74°23′W
- Country: Canada
- Province: Quebec
- Region: Montérégie
- RCM: Vaudreuil-Soulanges
- Constituted: 28 August 1880

Government
  - Mayor: Sandra Lavoratore
  - Federal riding: Vaudreuil
  - Prov. riding: Soulanges

Area
  - Total: 9.54 km^{2} (3.68 sq mi)
  - Land: 8.09 km^{2} (3.12 sq mi)

Population (2021)
  - Total: 582
  - Density: 71.9/km^{2} (186/sq mi)
  - Pop 2016-2021: ▲0.3%
  - Dwellings: 283
- Time zone: UTC−5 (EST)
  - Summer (DST): UTC−4 (EDT)
- Postal code(s): J0P 1N0
- Area codes: 450 and 579
- Highways A-40 (TCH): R-342
- Website: pointefortune.ca

Pointe-Fortune (French pronunciation: [pwɛ̃t fɔʁtyn]) is a municipality in southwestern Quebec, Canada, on the Ottawa River (Rivière des Outaouais) in Vaudreuil-Soulanges Regional County Municipality, northwest of Montreal. The population at the 2021 Census was 582.

== History ==
The area was part of the Seigneury of Rigaud, granted in 1732 to the brothers Pierre and François-Pierre Rigaud de Vaudreuil. Around 1750, they operated a trading post on a point in the Ottawa River, which later became known as Pointe Fortune. The name "Fortune" could refer to Colonel William Fortune who had received a 809 hectares (2,000 acres) concession in nearby Chatham Township at the end of the 18th century, or to Joseph Fortune, an early 19th century militiaman and surveyor.

The municipality was formerly called Petites-Écorces and Petit-Carillon (referring to the larger Carillon directly across the Ottawa River), but in 1851, the post office opened under the English name of Point Fortune (modified to its current name in 1954). In 1880, the Village Municipality of Pointe-Fortune was created out of territory ceded by Sainte-Madeleine-de-Rigaud. In 2023, the village of Pointe-Fortune became a Municipality. In 2025, Sandra Lavoratore became the first woman to become mayor of Pointe-Fortune.

== Geography ==
Pointe-Fortune is located on the right bank of the Ottawa River close to the Lake of Two Mountains. The locality borders the Ontario border, near the Carillon hydroelectric generating station. The municipality is located 65 km west of Montreal. Its territory is bounded to the west by the township of East Hawkesbury (Ontario) in the united counties of Prescott and Russell, to the north by the bay of Rigaud, to the east and to the south by the city of Rigaud. On the opposite shore of the lake of Two Mountains is the municipality of Saint-André-d'Argenteuil, in the Regional County Municipality of Argenteuil, in the Laurentides region. The total area of the municipality is 9.54km2, with 8.09km2 being terrestrial.

Pointe-Fortune is in the Great Lakes–St. Lawrence Lowlands and its terrain is flat. The altitude is 24m on the shore of the Lake of Two Mountains and rises to 48m at the southeastern end of the territory. The low ground levels create several wetlands inland. The soil of Pointe-Fortune consists in the eastern part of a sector dating from the Cambrian composed of sandstone, conglomerate, limestone and dolomite (Potsdam sandstone, Brador and Forteau formations) and, in its western part, of an area of dolomite and sandstone from the Lower Ordovician (Beekmantown group and Romaine formation).

== Demographics ==
Historical Census Data - Pointe-Fortune, Quebec
Year	Pop.	±%
1881	480	—
1891	322	−32.9%
1901	264	−18.0%
1911	311	+17.8%
1921	324	+4.2%
1931	305	−5.9%
1941	322	+5.6%
1951	312	−3.1%
1956	336	+7.7%
1961	473	+40.8%
1966	349	−26.2%
1971	332	−4.9%
1976	367	+10.5%
1981	369	+0.5%
1986	400	+8.4%
1991	413	+3.2%
1996	451	+9.2%
2001	457	+1.3%
2006	507	+10.9%
2011	542	+6.9%
2016	580	+7.0%
2021	582	+0.3%
Source: Statistics Canada

In the 2021 Census of Population conducted by Statistics Canada, Pointe-Fortune had a population of 582 living in 258 of its 283 total private dwellings, a change of 0.3% from its 2016 population of 580. With a land area of 8.09 km^{2} (3.12 sq mi), it had a population density of 71.9/km^{2} (186.3/sq mi) in 2021.

Private dwellings occupied by usual residents (2021): 258 (total dwellings: 283)

Canada census – Pointe-Fortune community profile

	2021	2016	2011
Population	582 (+0.3% from 2016)	580 (+7.0% from 2011)	542 (+6.9% from 2006)
Land area	8.09 km^{2} (3.12 sq mi)	8.26 km^{2} (3.19 sq mi)	8.35 km^{2} (3.22 sq mi)
Population density	71.9/km^{2} (186/sq mi)	70.2/km^{2} (182/sq mi)	64.9/km^{2} (168/sq mi)
Median age	50.0 (M: 49.2, F: 50.4)	47.9 (M: 47.8, F: 48.0)	44.7 (M: 46.7, F: 42.8)
Private dwellings	283 (total)	285 (total)	265 (total)
Median household income	$81,000	$63,680	$59,686

References: 2021 2016 2011

Canada Census Mother Tongue - Pointe-Fortune, Quebec
Census	Total	French			English			French & English			Other		
Year	Responses	Count	Trend	Pop %	Count	Trend	Pop %	Count	Trend	Pop %	Count	Trend	Pop %
2021	580	475	▲1.1%	81.9%	75	▼6.3%	12.9%	15	▲50.0%	2.6%	15	▼25.0%	2.6%
2016	580	470	▲8.0%	81.0%	80	▲6.7%	13.8%	10	0.0%	1.7%	20	0.0%	3.4%
2011	540	435	▲16.0%	80.6%	75	▼28.6%	13.9%	10	▲ n/a%	1.9%	20	▼20.0%	3.7%
2006	505	375	▼5.1%	74.3%	105	▲162.5%	20.8%	0	0.0%	0.0%	25	▲25.0%	5.0%
2001	455	395	0.0%	86.8%	40	▼33.3%	8.8%	0	0.0%	0.0%	20	▲ n/a%	4.4%
1996	455	395	n/a	86.8%	60	n/a	13.2%	0	n/a	0.0%	0	n/a	0.0%

== Attractions ==
Macdonell-Williamson House, which owes its existence to the fur trade and the Voyageurs, is located just west of the historical boundary marker, which still stands and marked the division between Upper and Lower Canada.

The Parish of Saint-François-Xavier-de-Pointe-Fortune celebrated its 100th anniversary in 2004. The municipality was originally served by the Catholic parish of St. Francois Xavier, established in 1904, which eventually closed on 24 December 2014. The church was sold and is now privately owned.

== Government ==
List of former mayors:

- John William Crosb (1880–1881, 1882–1883)
- Ernest A. Saint-Denis (1881–1882)
- George Augustus Barclay (1883–1884)
- André Roy (1884–1887)
- William Richard Hunsley (1887–1893)
- Joseph Séguin (1893–1895)
- John Middleton (1895–1899)
- William Brown (1899–1913, 1914–1917)
- Angus Victor Mc Lachlan (1913–1914)
- Eric Galt Brown (1917–1923)
- Joseph Elie Dicaire (1923–1927)
- Joseph Nephtalie Corbeil (1927–1933)
- Joseph Adelard Jean Marie Desjardins (1933–1936)
- Joseph Raoul Lafond (1936–1951, 1961–1964)
- Joseph Héliodore Oscar Labrie (1951–1959)
- Joseph-Paul-Réal Larocque (1959–1961)
- Joseph Wellie Leon Sabourin (1964–1969)
- Joseph Bernard Roméo Séguin (1969–1973)
- Joseph Raoul Juste Gérard Parson (1973–1979)
- Joseph Paul-Emile Roger Pharand (1979–1980)
- Joseph Denis Grégoire Labonté (1980–2001)
- Joseph Roger Gérard Normand Chevrier (2001–2005)
- David Eugene Doughty (2005–2009)
- Jean-Pierre Daoust (2009–2017)
- François Bélanger (2017–2025)
- Sandra Lavoratore (2025-present)

== Education ==
Commission Scolaire des Trois-Lacs operates Francophone schools.

- École de l'Épervière in Rigaud

Lester B. Pearson School Board operates Anglophone schools.

- Soulanges Elementary School in Saint-Télesphore or Evergreen Elementary and Forest Hill Elementary (Junior Campus and Senior campus) in Saint-Lazare

== See also ==
- List of anglophone communities in Quebec
- List of municipalities in Québec
