= Sainte-Justine-de-Newton =

- Municipality
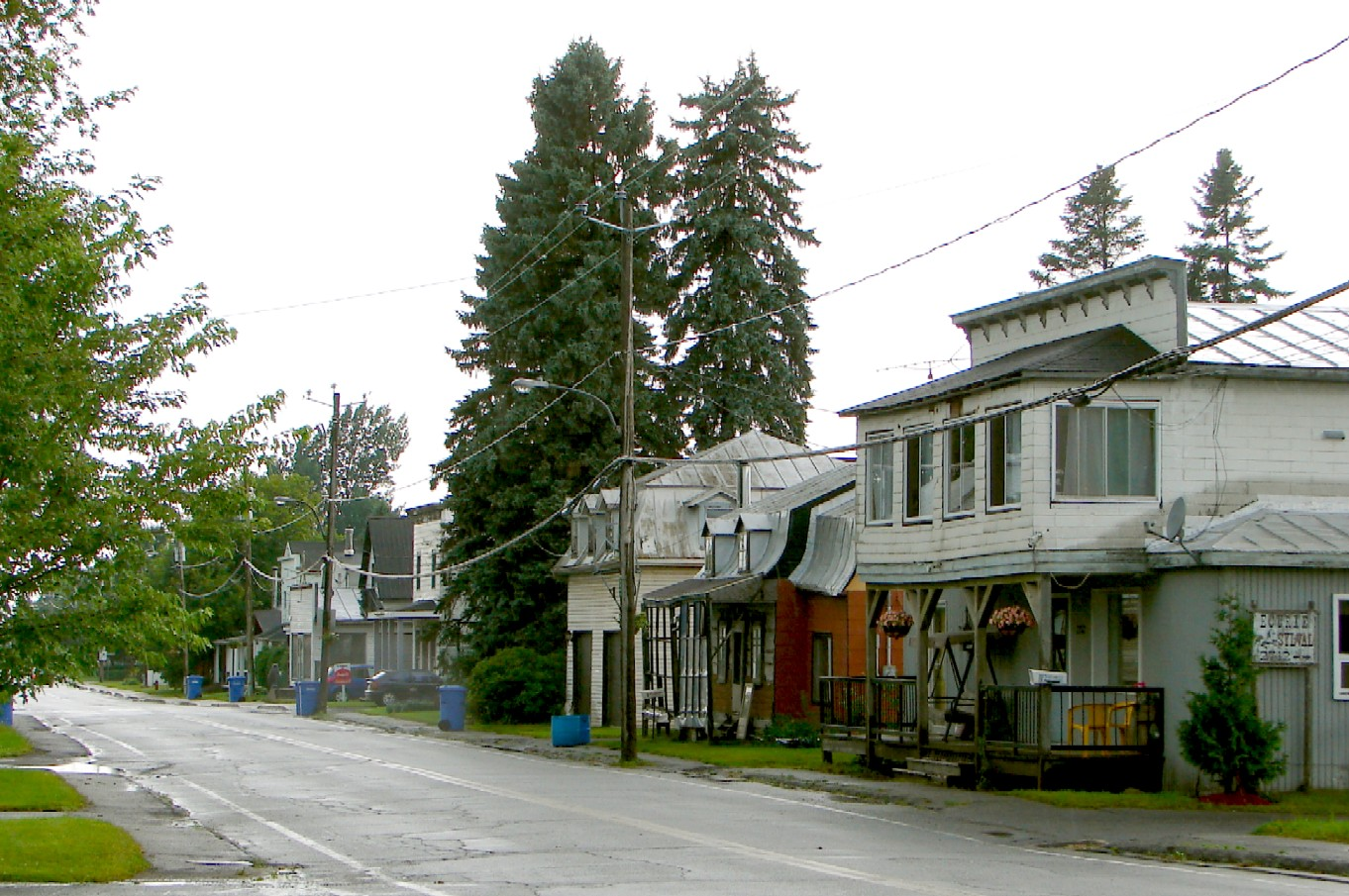
- Rue Principale

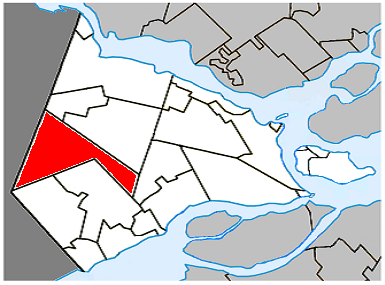
- Location within Vaudreuil-Soulanges RCM

- Location in southern Quebec
- Coordinates: 45°22′N 74°25′W
- Country: Canada
- Province: Quebec
- Region: Montérégie
- RCM: Vaudreuil-Soulanges
- Constituted: 1 July 1855
- Named for: Justina of Padua and Newton Abbot

Government
  - Mayor: Shawn Campbell
  - Federal riding: Salaberry—Suroît
  - Prov. riding: Soulanges

Area
  - Total: 84.85 km^{2} (32.76 sq mi)
  - Land: 84.59 km^{2} (32.66 sq mi)

Population (2021)
  - Total: 947
  - Density: 11.2/km^{2} (29/sq mi)
  - Pop 2016-2021: ▲2.7%
  - Dwellings: 443
- Time zone: UTC−5 (EST)
  - Summer (DST): UTC−4 (EDT)
- Postal code(s): J0P 1T0
- Area codes: 450 and 579
- Highways: R-325
- Website: www.sainte-justine-de-newton.ca

Sainte-Justine-de-Newton (French pronunciation: [sɛ̃t ʒystin də njutən]) is a municipality located in the Montérégie region of Quebec, Canada. The population as of the 2021 Canadian census was 947. The municipality is situated on Route 325 south of Très-Saint-Rédempteur, just east of the Ontario border.

== History ==
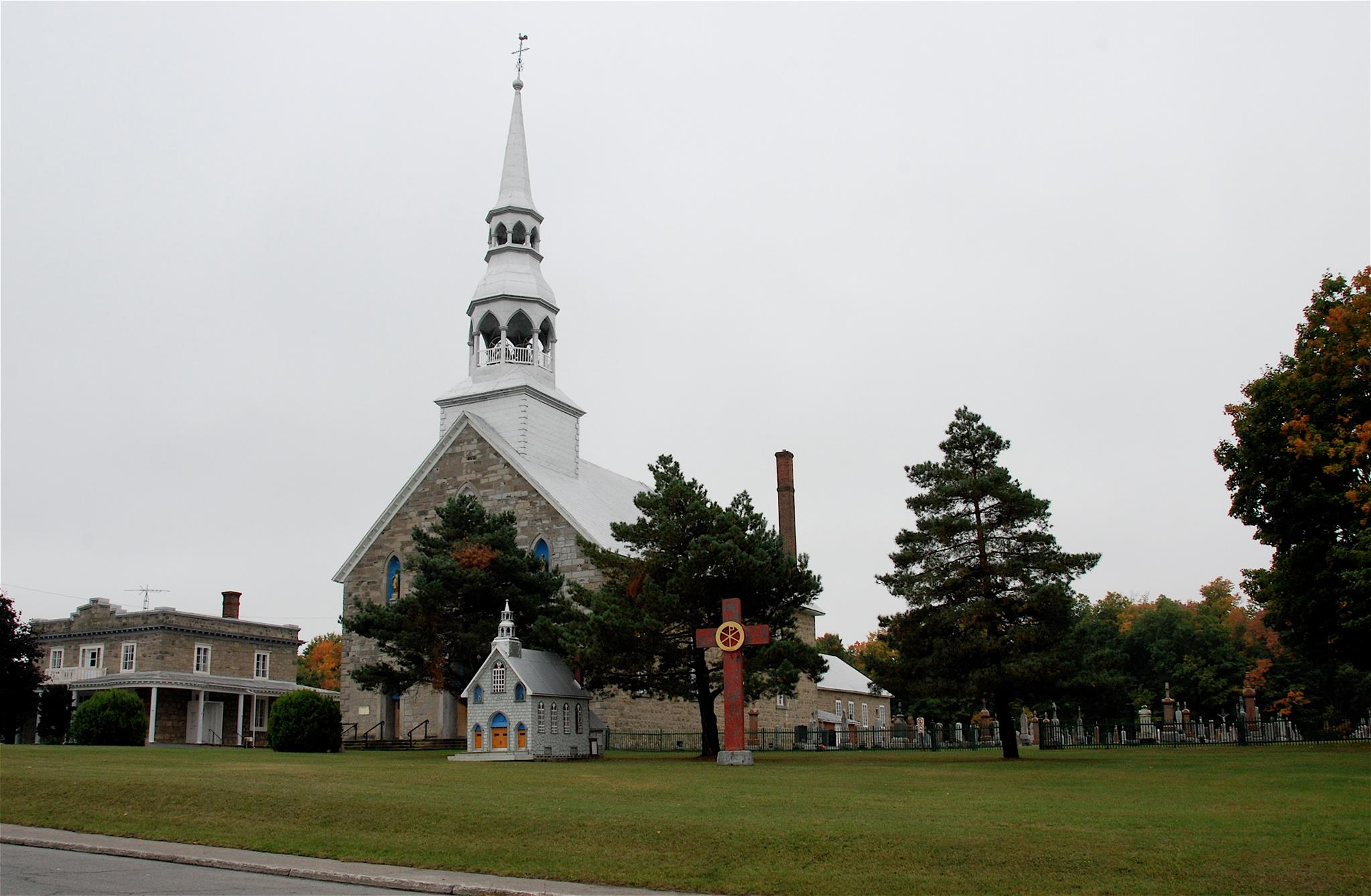
Parish church

In 1805, the geographic township of Newton was created, likely named after Newton Abbot in England. Sainte-Justine-de-Newton was also named after Justine de Padoue.

In 1845, the Township Municipality of Newton was formed, but abolished in 1847. In 1855, it was reestablished as the Parish Municipality of Sainte-Justine-de-Newton, combining the names of the parish and the geographic township. In 1865, its post office opened.

In 2008, the parish municipality changed its statutes to become a (regular) municipality.

== Demographics ==
Canada census – Sainte-Justine-de-Newton community profile

	2021	2016	2011
Population	947 (2.7% from 2016)	922 (-5.2% from 2011)	973 (+4.7% from 2006)
Land area	84.59 km^{2} (32.66 sq mi)	84.63 km^{2} (32.68 sq mi)	84.60 km^{2} (32.66 sq mi)
Population density	11.2/km^{2} (29/sq mi)	10.9/km^{2} (28/sq mi)	11.5/km^{2} (30/sq mi)
Median age	46.4 (M: 46.4, F: 46.0)	46.4 (M: 46.1, F: 46.8)	44.0 (M: 44.4, F: 43.8)
Private dwellings	443 (total)	426 (total)	437 (total)
Median household income	$63,200	$57,664	$36,689

References: 2021 2016 2011

Historical Census Data - Sainte-Justine-de-Newton, Quebec

Year	Pop.	±%
1861	1,029	—
1871	1,227	+19.2%
1881	1,671	+36.2%
1891	1,536	−8.1%
1901	1,472	−4.2%
1911	1,332	−9.5%
1921	1,248	−6.3%
1931	1,143	−8.4%
1941	1,250	+9.4%
1951	1,092	−12.6%
1956	1,038	−4.9%
1961	1,022	−1.5%

Year	Pop.	±%
1966	920	−10.0%
1971	866	−5.9%
1976	893	+3.1%
1981	938	+5.0%
1986	860	−8.3%
1991	926	+7.7%
1996	934	+0.9%
2001	888	−4.9%
2006	929	+4.6%
2011	973	+4.7%
2016	922	−5.2%
2021	947	+2.7%

Source: Statistics Canada

=== Language ===
Canada Census Mother Tongue - Sainte-Justine-de-Newton, Quebec
Census	Total	French			English			French & English			Other		
Year	Responses	Count	Trend	Pop %	Count	Trend	Pop %	Count	Trend	Pop %	Count	Trend	Pop %
2021	945	820	▲3.1%	86.8%	80	▼15.8%	8.5%	25	▲150.0%	2.6%	20	0.0%	2.1%
2016	920	795	▼5.9%	86.4%	95	▲11.8%	10.3%	10	▼33.3%	1.1%	20	▼25.0%	2.2%
2011	970	845	▼2.9%	87.1%	85	▲325.0%	8.8%	15	▲ n/a%	1.6%	25	▼44.4%	2.6%
2006	935	870	▲18.4%	93.1%	20	▼69.2%	2.1%	0	▼100.0%	0.0%	45	▼25.0%	4.8%
2001	885	735	▼18.3%	83.1%	65	▲62.5%	7.3%	25	▲ n/a%	2.8%	60	▲100.0%	6.8%
1996	970	900	n/a	92.8%	40	n/a	4.1%	0	n/a	0.0%	30	n/a	3.1%

== Government ==
List of former mayors:

- Donald Morrisson (1845–1847, 1862–1868)
- John Burke (1855–1860)
- Murdock McCuaig (1860–1862, 1870)
- Norman McCosham (1868–1870)
- Alfrède Godard (1870–1876, 1881–1885, 1903)
- François Xavier Legault (1876–1877, 1879–1880)
- Honoré Sauvé (1877–1879, 1880–1881, 1886–1887)
- Emmanuel Brunêt (1885–1886)
- Joseph Marcoux (1887–1895)
- Gabriël Legault (1895–1898)
- James Barry (1898–1903, 1906–1908, 1917–1921)
- George Napoléon Temins (1908–1909)
- Léon Sauvé (1910–1911)
- Joseph Guillaume Séguin (1911–1913)
- Narcisse Sabourin (1913–1914)
- Raphael Giroux (1914–1917, 1921–1922)
- Joseph Philippe Ernest Deguire (1922–1933)
- Joseph Oscar Boulais (1933–1939)
- Joseph Donat Ludger Lévac (1939–1942)
- Joseph Aléxandre Henry Lanthier (1942–1947)
- Patrick William Barry (1947–1951)
- Joseph Henri Adélard Bray (1951–1963)
- Joseph-Antoine-Eugène Fex (1963–1973)
- Joseph George Charlebois (1973–1981)
- Joseph Napoléon Raymond Menard (1981–1987)
- Claude Fournier (1987–1992)
- Joseph Maurice Gérard André Lanthier (1992–2005)
- Carol Lazare Dubé (2005–2009)
- Patricia Domingos (2009–2013)
- Gisèle Fournier (2013–2017)
- Denis Ranger (2017–2021)
- Shawn Campbell (2021–present)

== Education ==
Commission Scolaire des Trois-Lacs operates Francophone schools.

- École du Val-des-Prés Sainte-Justine

Lester B. Pearson School Board operates Anglophone schools.

- Soulanges Elementary School in Saint-Télesphore or Evergreen Elementary and Forest Hill Elementary (Junior Campus and Senior campus) in Saint-Lazare

== See also ==
- List of anglophone communities in Quebec
- List of municipalities in Quebec
