= Rivière-Beaudette =

- Municipality
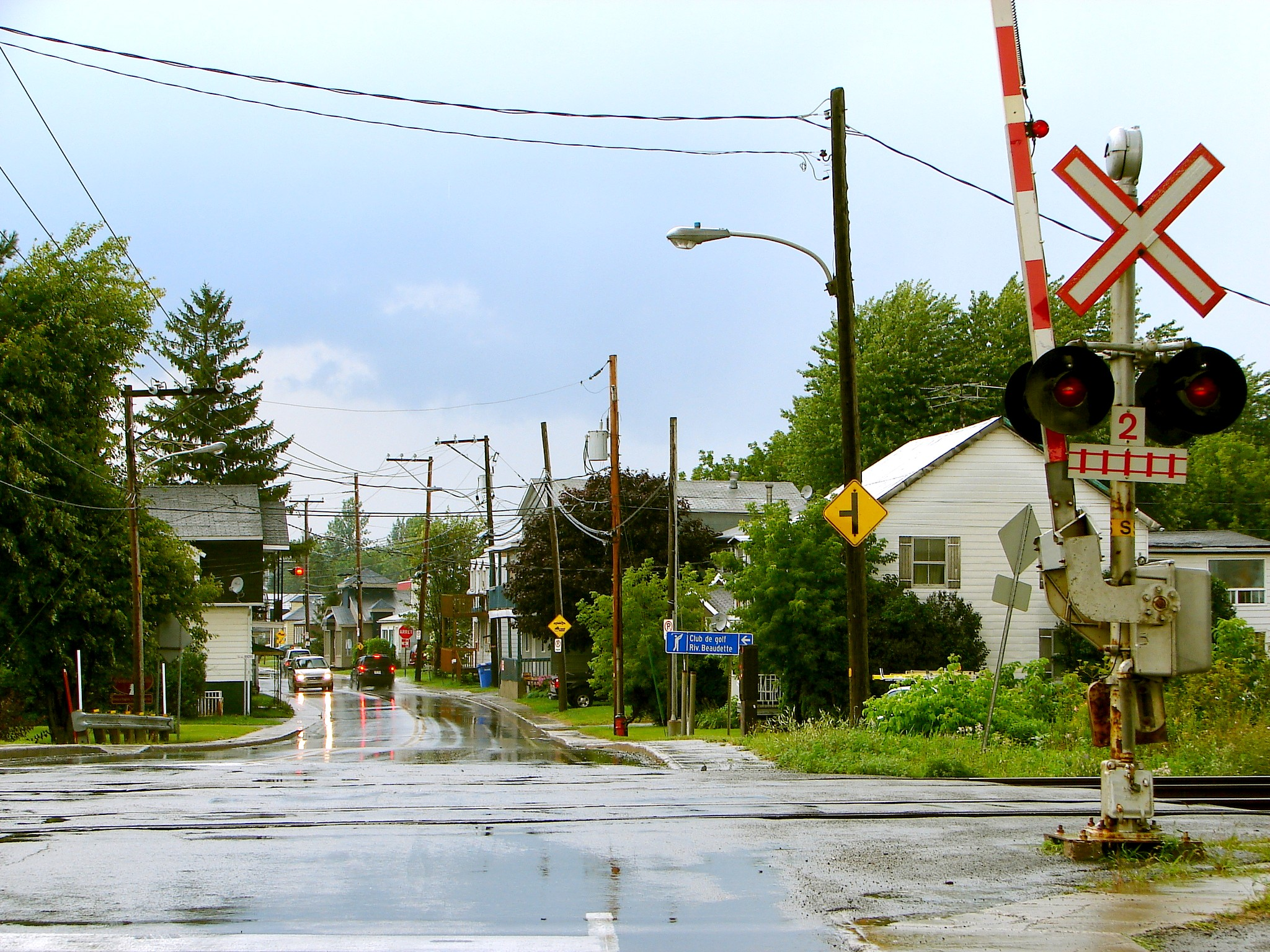
- Route 325 at Riviere-Beaudette

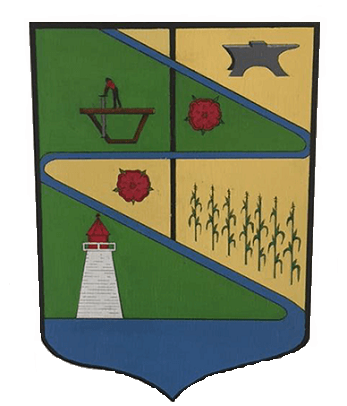
- Flag Coat of arms

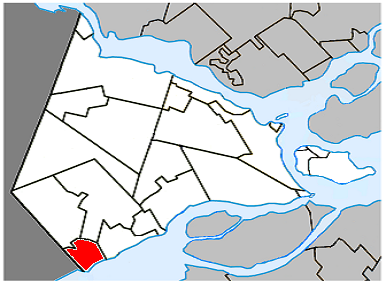
- Location within Vaudreuil-Soulanges RCM

- Location in southern Quebec
- Coordinates: 45°14′N 74°20′W
- Country: Canada
- Province: Quebec
- Region: Montérégie
- RCM: Vaudreuil-Soulanges
- Constituted: 17 January 1990

Government
  - Mayor: Patrick Bousez
  - Federal riding: Beauharnois—Salaberry—Soulanges—Huntingdon
  - Prov. riding: Soulanges

Area
  - Municipality: 25.21 km^{2} (9.73 sq mi)
  - Land: 18.48 km^{2} (7.14 sq mi)
  - Urban: 3.47 km^{2} (1.34 sq mi)

Population (2021)
  - Municipality: 2,489
  - Density: 134.7/km^{2} (349/sq mi)
  - Urban: 1,854
  - Urban density: 534.4/km^{2} (1,384/sq mi)
  - Pop 2016-2021: ▲18.7%
  - Dwellings: 1,069
- Time zone: UTC−5 (EST)
  - Summer (DST): UTC−4 (EDT)
- Postal code(s): J0P 1R0
- Area codes: 450 and 579
- Highways A-20: R-325; R-338
- Website: www.riviere-beaudette.com

Rivière-Beaudette (French pronunciation: [ʁivjɛʁ bodɛt]; pop. 2,489) is a municipality of Quebec, Canada, located in the southwest corner of the Vaudreuil-Soulanges Regional County Municipality on the border with Ontario along the St. Lawrence River. The population as of the 2021 Canadian census was 2,489.

The area is primarily made up of farmland with residential development along the St. Lawrence River.

== History ==
This location was first identified as "Pointe au Baudet" as early as 1686 on a map by Deshayes. This name, also spelled "Beaudet" and "Baudette" over time, refers to a small peninsula in St. Lawrence River, and was also given to the stream that empties into the St. Lawrence next to it. Various theories exist as to why this location was called baudet, since this name could refer to a donkey, a type of folding bed with canvas straps, or a trestle for cutting wood.

In 1734, Pointe au Baudet was included in the seigneury granted to Paul-Joseph Le Moyne de Longueuil. By 1787, a sawmill existed at the "Baudet" River. In 1855, the Grand Trunk Railway was constructed through the area, and two years later, the "River Beaudette" post office opened.

In 1887, the Village Municipality of Rivière Beaudette was formed out of territory ceded by Saint-Zotique.

In 1916, the Parish Municipality of Sainte Claire d'Assise was created, also out of territory ceded by Saint-Zotique. On April 1, 1978, it was renamed to the Parish Municipality of Rivière-Beaudette.

On January 17, 1990, the parish and village merged to form the Municipality of Rivière-Beaudette.

== Demographics ==
Canada census – Rivière-Beaudette community profile

	2021	2016	2011
Population	2,489 (18.7% from 2016)	2,097 (11.2% from 2011)	1,885 (+9.6% from 2006)
Land area	18.48 km^{2} (7.14 sq mi)	18.68 km^{2} (7.21 sq mi)	18.51 km^{2} (7.15 sq mi)
Population density	134.7/km^{2} (349/sq mi)	112.3/km^{2} (291/sq mi)	101.9/km^{2} (264/sq mi)
Median age	40.4 (M: 42.0, F: 39.2)	42.2 (M: 42.8, F: 41.6)	43.5 (M: 44.3, F: 41.8)
Private dwellings	1,069 (total)	951 (total)	894 (total)
Median household income	$88,000	$68,864	$63,336

References: 2021 2016 2011

Historical Census Data - Rivière-Beaudette, Quebec

Year	Pop.	±%
1986	1,047	—
1991	1,292	+23.4%
1996	1,381	+6.9%
2001	1,464	+6.0%

Year	Pop.	±%
2006	1,720	+17.5%
2011	1,885	+9.6%
2016	2,097	+11.2%
2021	2,489	+18.7%

Source: Statistics Canada

=== Language ===
Canada Census Mother Tongue - Rivière-Beaudette, Quebec
Census	Total	French			English			French & English			Other		
Year	Responses	Count	Trend	Pop %	Count	Trend	Pop %	Count	Trend	Pop %	Count	Trend	Pop %
2021	2,465	2,170	▲18.3%	88.0%	195	▲21.9%	7.9%	60	▲100.0%	2.4%	45	▼10.0%	1.8%
2016	2,080	1,835	▲14.7%	88.2%	160	▼5.9%	7.7%	30	0.0%	1.4%	50	▼16.7%	2.4%
2011	1,860	1,600	▲8.1%	86.0%	170	▼10.5%	9.1%	30	▲ n/a%	1.6%	60	▲140.0%	3.2%
2006	1,695	1,480	▲10.4%	87.3%	190	▲123.5%	11.2%	0	▼100.0%	0.0%	25	▲ n/a%	1.5%
2001	1,440	1,340	▲16.5%	93.1%	85	▼43.3%	5.9%	15	▼25.0%	1.0%	0	▼100.0%	0.0%
1996	1,350	1,150	n/a	85.2%	150	n/a	11.1%	20	n/a	1.5%	30	n/a	2.2%

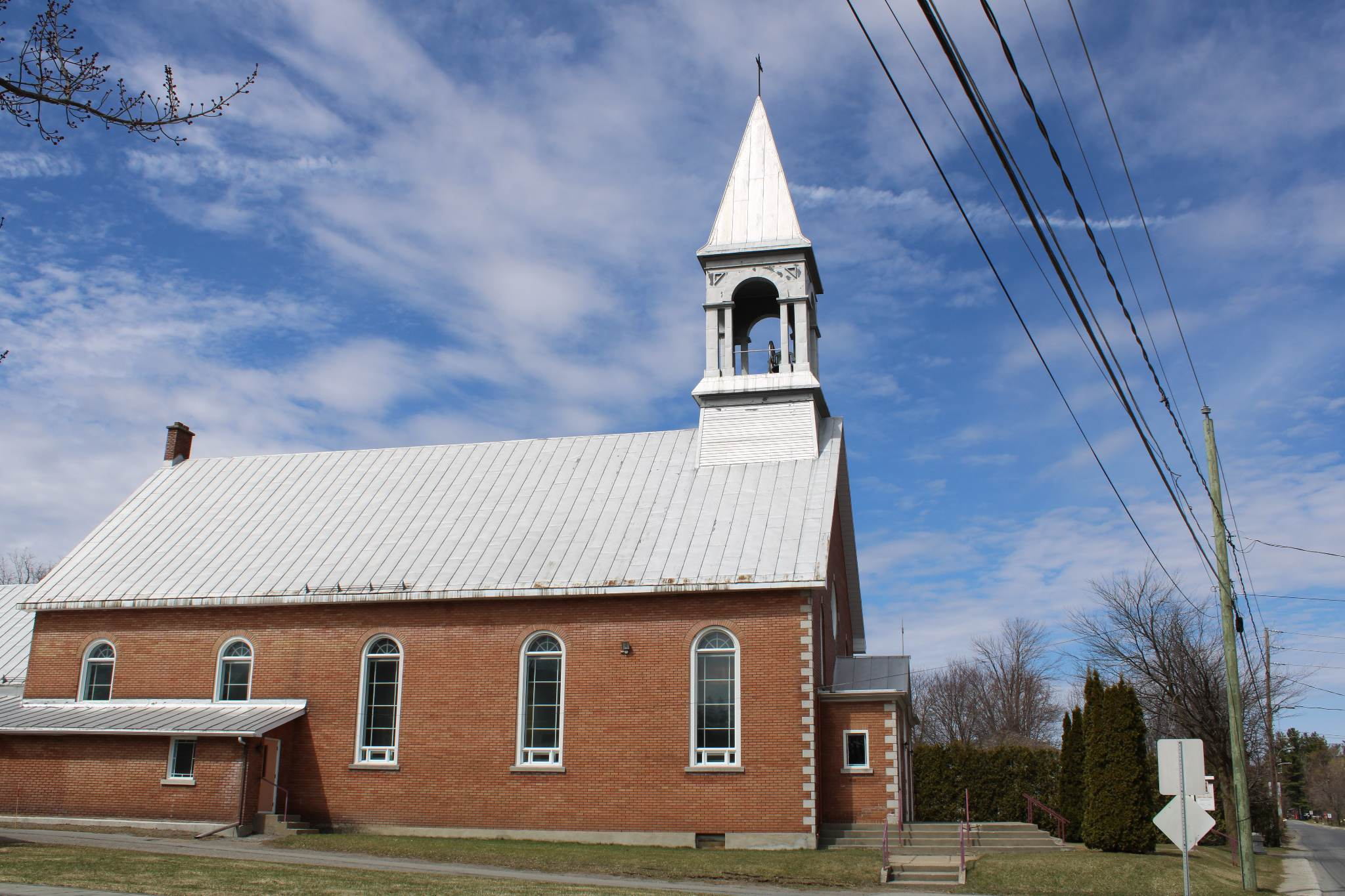
The church of Rivière-Beaudette and its bell tower

== Attractions ==
Rivière-Beaudette is home to nine-hole golf course which integrates the natural landscape of the site to maximize the golfers’ experience. This course offers at each hole a choice of 5 different ways to start, allowing many distance and difficulty variations.

== Government ==
Rivière-Beaudette federal election results
Year	Liberal		Conservative		Bloc Québécois		New Democratic		Green	
2021	23%	323	30%	420	34%	483	7%	100	0%	0
2019	27%	328	11%	156	48%	675	8%	119	3%	45
2015	31%	287	12%	114	29%	265	24%	221	3%	25
2011	7%	61	10%	87	25%	222	57%	494	1%	9 873
2008	16%	128	20%	158	50%	388	11%	86	3%	23
2006	21%	158	18%	141	49%	372	8%	60	4%	32
2004	38%	256	18%	50	49%	303	8%	28	4%	24

Rivière-Beaudette provincial election results
Year	CAQ		Liberal		QC solidaire		Parti Québécois	
2022	44%	425	9%	85	15%	143	13%	129
2018	49%	670	18%	249	12%	168	12%	167
2014	0%	0	46%	509	12%	138	37%	418
2012	26%	242	28%	262	5%	45	38%	361

Rivière-Beaudette forms part of the federal electoral district of Salaberry—Suroît and has been represented by Claude DeBellefeuille of the Bloc Québécois since 2019. Provincially, Rivière-Beaudette is part of the Soulanges electoral district and is represented by Marilyne Picard of the Coalition Avenir Québec since 2018.

List of former mayors (since formation of current municipality):

- Richard Leroux (1990–2006)
- Denis Brodeur (2006–2009)
- Patrick Bousez (2009–present)

== Education ==
Commission Scolaire des Trois-Lacs operates Francophone schools.

Lester B. Pearson School Board operates Anglophone schools.

- Soulanges Elementary School in Saint-Télesphore or Evergreen Elementary and Forest Hill Elementary (Junior Campus and Senior campus) in Saint-Lazare

== See also ==
- List of municipalities in Quebec
