= Saint-Polycarpe, Quebec =

Saint-Polycarpe
- Municipality
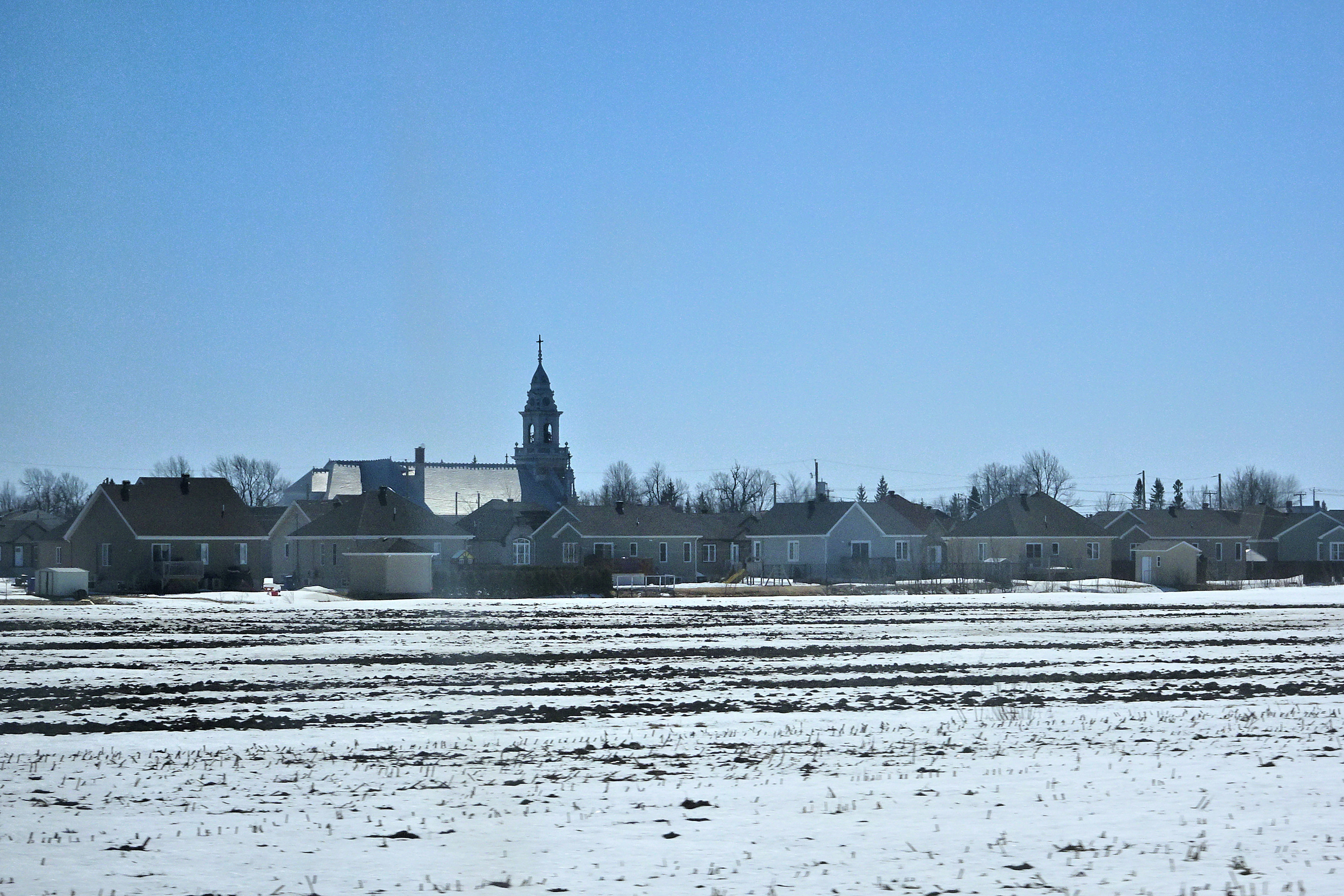
- Motto: travail, progrès et égalité pour tous (work, progress, and equality for all)
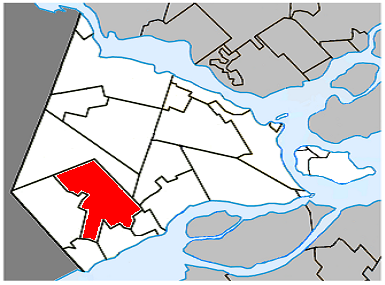
- Location within Vaudreuil-Soulanges RCM

- Location in southern Quebec
- Coordinates: 45°18′N 74°18′W
- Country: Canada
- Province: Quebec
- Region: Montérégie
- RCM: Vaudreuil-Soulanges
- Constituted: 31 December 1988

Government
  - Mayor: Jean-Pierre Ménard
  - Fed. riding: Salaberry—Suroît
  - Prov. riding: Soulanges

Area
  - Municipality: 70.73 km^{2} (27.31 sq mi)
  - Land: 69.88 km^{2} (26.98 sq mi)
  - Urban: 0.86 km^{2} (0.33 sq mi)

Population (2021)
  - Municipality: 2,372
  - Density: 33.9/km^{2} (88/sq mi)
  - Urban: 1,365
  - Urban density: 1,595.9/km^{2} (4,133/sq mi)
  - Pop 2016-2021: ▲6.7%
  - Dwellings: 1,030
- Time zone: UTC−5 (EST)
  - Summer (DST): UTC−4 (EDT)
- Postal code(s): J0P 1X0
- Area codes: 450, 579
- Highways: R-340
- Website: stpolycarpe.ca

Saint-Polycarpe (French pronunciation: [sɛ̃ pɔlikaʁp]) is a municipality in the Vaudreuil-Soulanges Regional County Municipality in the Montérégie region west of Montreal, Quebec, Canada, and just east of the Quebec-Ontario border. It was named for Polycarp, a 2nd-century bishop of Smyrna. The population as of the 2021 Canadian Census was 2,372.

While a parish during the 18th century, its territory included portions of what is now part of Saint-Zotique.

== History ==
Settlement began around 1800 when a sawmill and a flour mill were built at the rapids of the Delisle river. In 1818, a chapel was built there and in 1830, the parish was established, called Saint-Polycarpe de la Nouvelle-Longueuil. Its post office was built in 1846.

In 1845, the Municipality of La Nouvelle-Longueuil was created, but abolished in 1847. In 1855, it was recreated out of Vaudreuil County as the Parish Municipality of Saint-Polycarpe. In 1887, the village itself split off from the surrounding rural parish to form the Village Municipality of Saint-Polycarpe.

On 31 December 1988, the parish and village merged again to form the Municipality of Saint-Polycarpe.

== Geography ==
=== Climate ===
Based on the Dalhousie Mills station in Saint-Télesphore

Climate data for Saint-Polycarpe
| Month | Jan | Feb | Mar | Apr | May | Jun | Jul | Aug | Sep | Oct | Nov | Dec | Year |
|---|---|---|---|---|---|---|---|---|---|---|---|---|---|
| Record high °C (°F) | 11.5 (52.7) | 14.0 (57.2) | 23.0 (73.4) | 31.5 (88.7) | 32.2 (90.0) | 34.0 (93.2) | 34.0 (93.2) | 35.0 (95.0) | 36.5 (97.7) | 27.8 (82.0) | 21.5 (70.7) | 17.5 (63.5) | 36.5 (97.7) |
| Mean daily maximum °C (°F) | −5.9 (21.4) | −3.2 (26.2) | −2.3 (27.9) | 11.2 (52.2) | 18.9 (66.0) | 23.6 (74.5) | 26.1 (79.0) | 25.1 (77.2) | 20.4 (68.7) | 13.0 (55.4) | 5.4 (41.7) | −1.6 (29.1) | 11.3 (52.3) |
| Daily mean °C (°F) | −11.1 (12.0) | −8.9 (16.0) | −2.9 (26.8) | 5.6 (42.1) | 12.6 (54.7) | 17.5 (63.5) | 20.0 (68.0) | 18.9 (66.0) | 14.4 (57.9) | 7.7 (45.9) | 1.2 (34.2) | −6.1 (21.0) | 5.8 (42.4) |
| Mean daily minimum °C (°F) | −16.2 (2.8) | −14.5 (5.9) | −8.1 (17.4) | -0.0 (32.0) | 6.3 (43.3) | 11.4 (52.5) | 13.9 (57.0) | 12.7 (54.9) | 8.3 (46.9) | 2.3 (36.1) | −2.9 (26.8) | −10.5 (13.1) | 0.2 (32.4) |
| Record low °C (°F) | −41.0 (−41.8) | −40 (−40) | −34 (−29) | −16.1 (3.0) | −5.0 (23.0) | −2.5 (27.5) | 3.5 (38.3) | −0.6 (30.9) | −6.0 (21.2) | −10.0 (14.0) | −23.0 (−9.4) | −38.3 (−36.9) | −41.0 (−41.8) |
| Average precipitation mm (inches) | 91.5 (3.60) | 74.2 (2.92) | 77.7 (3.06) | 87.0 (3.43) | 93.0 (3.66) | 100.4 (3.95) | 93.3 (3.67) | 89.2 (3.51) | 95.2 (3.75) | 91.4 (3.60) | 100.7 (3.96) | 83.7 (3.30) | 1,077.2 (42.41) |
| Average rainfall mm (inches) | 32.0 (1.26) | 26.9 (1.06) | 34.1 (1.34) | 70.8 (2.79) | 92.8 (3.65) | 100.4 (3.95) | 93.3 (3.67) | 89.2 (3.51) | 95.2 (3.75) | 88.4 (3.48) | 78.8 (3.10) | 36.6 (1.44) | 838.5 (33.01) |
| Average snowfall cm (inches) | 59.6 (23.5) | 47.2 (18.6) | 43.6 (17.2) | 16.2 (6.4) | 0.2 (0.1) | 0.0 (0.0) | 0.0 (0.0) | 0.0 (0.0) | 0.0 (0.0) | 3.0 (1.2) | 21.9 (8.6) | 47.0 (18.5) | 238.7 (94.0) |
Source: Environment Canada

== Demographics ==
Canada census – Saint-Polycarpe, Quebec community profile

| | 2021 | 2016 | 2011 |
| Population | 2,372 (6.7% from 2016) | 2,224 (+13.0% from 2011) | 1,969 (+15.3% from 2006) |
| Land area | 69.88 km^{2} (26.98 sq mi) | 70.00 km^{2} (27.03 sq mi) | 69.97 km^{2} (27.02 sq mi) |
| Population density | 33.9/km^{2} (88/sq mi) | 31.8/km^{2} (82/sq mi) | 28.1/km^{2} (73/sq mi) |
| Median age | 38.4 (M: 38.8, F: 38.0) | 37.7 (M: 38.2, F: 37.2) | 37.2 (M: 38.3, F: 36.1) |
| Private dwellings | 1,030 (total) 1,007 (occupied) | 947 (total) | 829 (total) |
| Median household income | $77,500 | $62,144 | $52,451 |

References: 2021 2016 2011

Historical Census Data - Saint-Polycarpe, Quebec

| Year | Pop. | ±% |
|---|---|---|
| 1991 | 1,640 | — |
| 1996 | 1,676 | +2.2% |
| 2001 | 1,657 | −1.1% |
| 2006 | 1,708 | +3.1% |

| Year | Pop. | ±% |
|---|---|---|
| 2011 | 1,969 | +15.3% |
| 2016 | 2,224 | +13.0% |
| 2021 | 2,372 | +6.7% |

Source: Statistics Canada

=== Language ===
Canada Census Mother Tongue - Saint-Polycarpe, Quebec
| Census | Total | French | | | English | | | French & English | | | Other | | |
| Year | Responses | Count | Trend | Pop % | Count | Trend | Pop % | Count | Trend | Pop % | Count | Trend | Pop % |
| 2021 | 2,375 | 2,075 | ▲3.2% | 87.4% | 140 | ▲40.0% | 5.9% | 70 | ▲180.0% | 2.9% | 70 | ▼22.2% | 2.9% |
| 2016 | 2,225 | 2,010 | ▲12.3% | 90.3% | 100 | ▲5.3% | 4.5% | 25 | ▲66.7% | 1.1% | 90 | ▲38.5% | 4.0% |
| 2011 | 1,965 | 1,790 | ▲10.2% | 91.1% | 95 | ▲171.4% | 4.8% | 15 | ▲50.0% | 0.8% | 65 | ▲62.5% | 3.3% |
| 2006 | 1,710 | 1,625 | ▲2.2% | 95.0% | 35 | ▼30.0% | 2.1% | 10 | ▲ n/a% | 0.6% | 40 | ▲ n/a% | 2.3% |
| 2001 | 1,640 | 1,590 | ▲6.0% | 97.0% | 50 | ▼61.5% | 3.1% | 0 | ▼100.0% | 0.0% | 0 | ▼100.0% | 0.0% |
| 1996 | 1,650 | 1,500 | n/a | 90.9% | 130 | n/a | 7.9% | 10 | n/a | 0.6% | 10 | n/a | 0.6% |

== Government ==
List of mayors since formation of current municipality:

- Joseph-Donat-Normand Ménard (1989–2012)
- Roland Daneau (2012–2013)
- Jean-Yves Poirier (2013–2025)
- Jean-Pierre Ménard (2025–present)

== See also ==
- List of municipalities in Quebec
