= Saint-Télesphore =

- Municipality
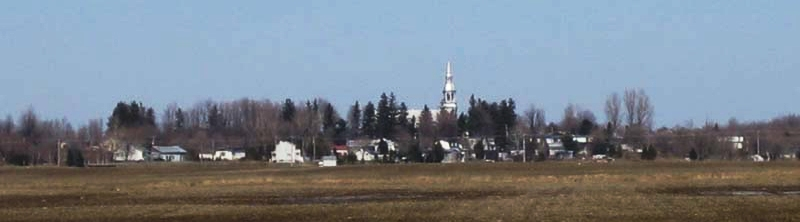
- Motto: Je ferai mon chemin (I will make my way)
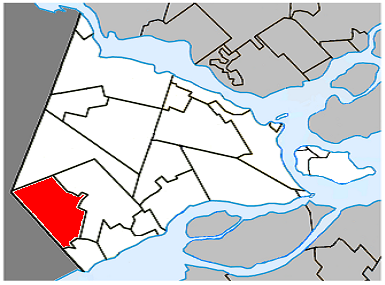
- Location within Vaudreuil-Soulanges RCM

- Location in southern Quebec
- Coordinates: 45°18′N 74°23′W
- Country: Canada
- Province: Quebec
- Region: Montérégie
- RCM: Vaudreuil-Soulanges
- Constituted: 19 April 1877

Government
  - Mayor: David Watson McKay
  - Federal riding: Salaberry—Suroît
  - Prov. riding: Soulanges

Area
  - Total: 60.67 km^{2} (23.42 sq mi)
  - Land: 60.10 km^{2} (23.20 sq mi)

Population (2021)
  - Total: 754
  - Density: 12.5/km^{2} (32/sq mi)
  - Pop 2016-2021: ▼0.7%
  - Dwellings: 352
- Time zone: UTC−5 (EST)
  - Summer (DST): UTC−4 (EDT)
- Postal code(s): J0P 1Y0
- Area codes: 450 and 579
- Highways: R-325; R-340
- Website: saint-telesphore.com

Saint-Télesphore (French pronunciation: [sɛ̃ telɛsfɔʁ]) is a municipality located in Vaudreuil-Soulanges Regional County Municipality, Quebec (Canada). The population as of the 2021 Canadian census was 754. The municipality is situated west of Saint-Polycarpe, south of Sainte-Justine-de-Newton, north of Rivière-Beaudette and east of the provincial border near North Lancaster, Ontario.

The municipality is named for Pope Telesphorus, who reigned from 126 to 138 AD. In addition to the village of Saint-Télesphore itself, the municipality also includes the community of Dalhousie or Dalhousie Station along the Canadian Pacific railway.

== History ==
Settlement began around 1800 with the arrival of Scottish, Irish, and English immigrants. At that time, the place was called Rivière-Delisle, Lac-Saint-François, or Rivière-au-Beaudet.

In 1877, the Parish Municipality of Saint-Télesphore was created, named after the parish that was formed one year earlier. In 1879, its post office opened.

On August 7, 2010, the parish municipality changed its statutes to become a (regular) municipality.

== Demographics ==
Canada census – Saint-Télesphore community profile

	2021	2016	2011
Population	754 (-0.7% from 2016)	759 (-0.4% from 2011)	762 (-0.9% from 2006)
Land area	60.10 km^{2} (23.20 sq mi)	60.33 km^{2} (23.29 sq mi)	60.42 km^{2} (23.33 sq mi)
Population density	12.5/km^{2} (32/sq mi)	12.6/km^{2} (33/sq mi)	12.6/km^{2} (33/sq mi)
Median age	43.6 (M: 44.0, F: 43.2)	40.9 (M: 40.3, F: 41.8)	43.1 (M: 43.5, F: 42.3)
Private dwellings	352 (total)	345 (total)	361 (total)
Median household income	$62,400	$54,592	$47,601

References: 2021 2016 2011

Historical Census Data - Saint-Télesphore, Quebec

Year	Pop.	±%
1881	1,285	—
1891	1,307	+1.7%
1901	1,301	−0.5%
1911	1,237	−4.9%
1921	1,231	−0.5%
1931	1,160	−5.8%
1941	1,194	+2.9%
1951	1,085	−9.1%
1956	1,031	−5.0%
1961	954	−7.5%
1966	901	−5.6%

Year	Pop.	±%
1971	816	−9.4%
1976	792	−2.9%
1981	806	+1.8%
1986	777	−3.6%
1991	772	−0.6%
1996	805	+4.3%
2001	773	−4.0%
2006	769	−0.5%
2011	762	−0.9%
2016	759	−0.4%
2021	754	−0.7%

Source: Statistics Canada

=== Language ===
Canada Census Mother Tongue - Saint-Télesphore, Quebec
Census	Total	French			English			French & English			Other		
Year	Responses	Count	Trend	Pop %	Count	Trend	Pop %	Count	Trend	Pop %	Count	Trend	Pop %
2021	720	635	▼3.8%	84.1%	75	0.0%	9.9%	30	▲50.0%	4.0%	10	▲100.0%	1.3%
2016	760	660	▲0.8%	86.8%	75	▼6.3%	9.9%	20	0.0%	2.6%	5	▼50.0%	0.7%
2011	765	655	▲4.0%	85.6%	80	▼33.3%	10.5%	20	▲ n/a%	2.6%	10	▼33.3%	1.3%
2006	765	630	▼4.5%	82.4%	120	▲14.3%	15.7%	0	▼100.0%	0.0%	15	▲ n/a%	2.0%
2001	775	660	▼9.6%	85.2%	105	▲23.5%	13.6%	10	▲ n/a%	1.3%	0	0.0%	0.0%
1996	815	730	n/a	89.6%	85	n/a	10.4%	0	n/a	0.0%	0	n/a	0.0%

== Government ==
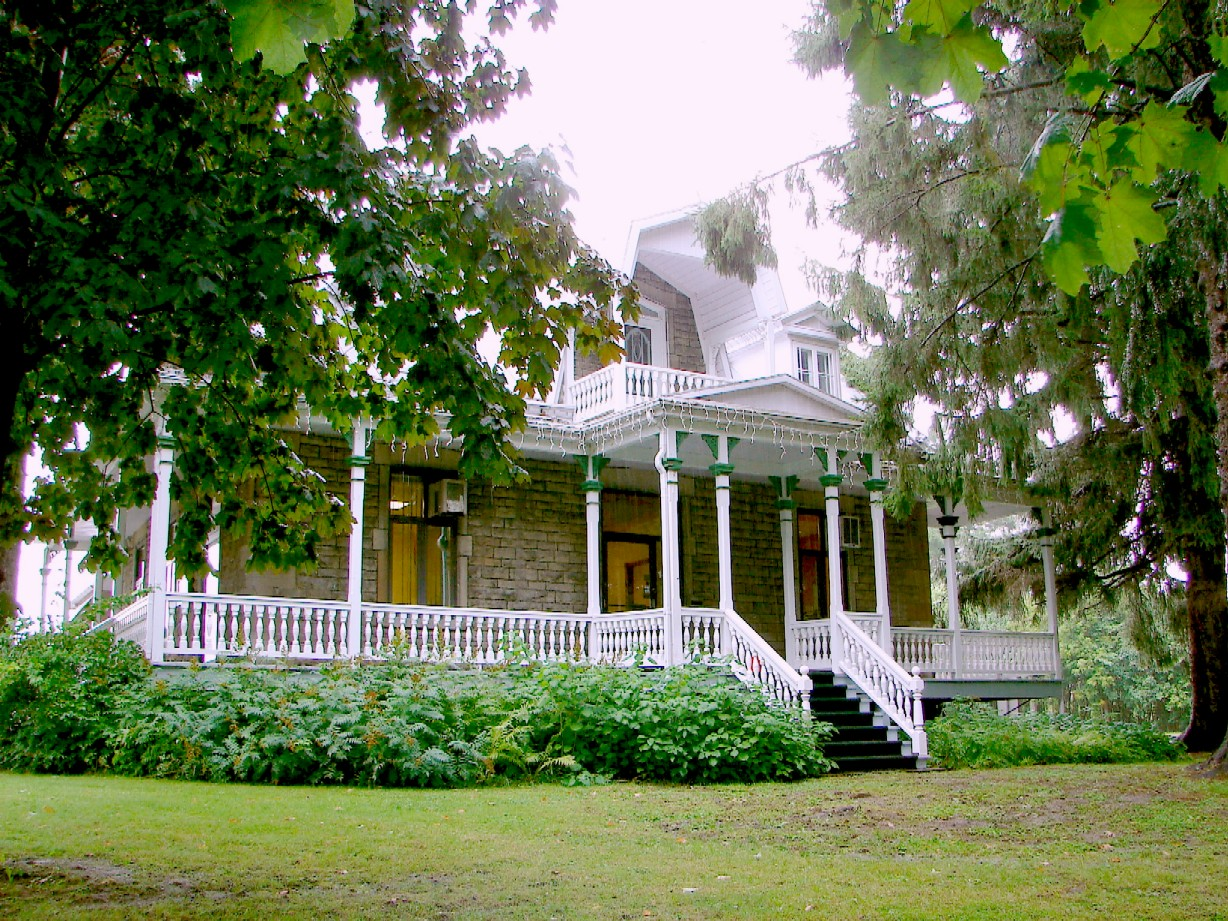
Town Hall

List of former mayors:

- Camille Gourgon (1878–1883)
- Jean Baptiste Campeau (1883–1884, 1885–1886)
- Athanase Daou (1884–1885, 1886–1889)
- Joseph Pilon (1889–1893, 1897–1899, 1902–1905)
- Louis Charlebois (1893–1897)
- Joseph Antoine Moyse Leroux (1899–1902, 1917-1919)
- Joseph Moyse Beauchamp (1905–1909)
- François Xavier Cuillierier (1909–1913)
- Louis Sauvé (1913–1914)
- Zotique Dicaire (1914–1917)
- Joseph Alfred Théodule Pilon (1919–1923)
- Joseph Arthur Hyacinthe St. Denis (1923–1927)
- Joseph Alfred Louis Charlebois (1927–1939)
- Joseph Samuel Evariste Braseau (1939–1953)
- Joseph Arcade Napoléon Bruno St-Denis (1953–1959)
- Joseph-Elzéar-Rosario-Richard Gaston Pilon (1959–1963)
- Joseph Jean-Baptiste Rémi Sauvé (1963–1981, 1987–1999)
- Joseph Marcel Eléonore Descent (1981–1983)
- Robert Bourgon (1983–1987, 1999–2003)
- Joseph Albert Patrice Claude Cyr (2003–2009)
- Yvon Bériault (2009–2021)
- David Watson McKay (2021–present)

== Education ==
Commission Scolaire des Trois-Lacs operates Francophone schools.

- École du Val-des-Prés Immaculée-Conception

Lester B. Pearson School Board operates Anglophone schools.

- Soulanges Elementary School in Saint-Télesphore or Evergreen Elementary and Forest Hill Elementary (Junior Campus and Senior campus) in Saint-Lazare

== See also ==
- List of anglophone communities in Quebec
- List of municipalities in Quebec
