= Centre de services scolaire des Trois-Lacs =

Coordinates: 45.4055°N 74.0327°W

The Centre de services scolaire des Trois-Lacs is serving 5 francophone school districts in the Canadian province of Quebec. It comprises several primary schools and high schools across municipalities in the Montérégie region. The commission is overseen by a board of elected school trustees. It is headquartered in Vaudreuil-Dorion.

== Schools ==
Secondary:

- École secondaire de la Cité-des-Jeunes (Vaudreuil-Dorion)
- École secondaire du Chêne-Bleu (Pincourt)
- École secondaire Soulanges (Saint-Polycarpe)

Primary:

- École à l'Orée-du-Bois (Saint-Lazare)
- École Auclair (Saint-Lazare)
- École Brind'Amour Pavillon P (Vaudreuil-Dorion)
- École Cuillierrier (Saint-Clet) - integrated with École Sainte-Marthe
- École de Coteau-du-Lac (all in Coteau-du-Lac)
  - pavillon Académie-Wilson
  - pavillon de l'Éclusière
  - pavillon Saint-Ignace
- École de la Samare (Notre-Dame-de-l'Île-Perrot)
- École de l'Épervière (Rigaud)
- École de l'Hymne-au-Printemps (Vaudreuil-Dorion)
- École de la Riveraine (Saint-Zotique) - integrated with École Saint-Zotique
- École des Orioles (Saint-Zotique)
- École du Papillon-Bleu (all in Vaudreuil-Dorion)
  - pavillon St-Jean-Baptiste
  - pavillon Sainte-Trinité
- École du Val-des-Prés Immaculée-Conception (Saint-Télesphore)
- École du Val-des-Prés Sacré-Cœur (Saint-Polycarpe)
- École du Val-des-Prés Sainte-Justine (Sainte-Justine-de-Newton)
- École François-Perrot (L'Île-Perrot)
- École Harwood (Vaudreuil-Dorion)
- École José-Maria (Terrasse-Vaudreuil)
- École La Perdriolle (L'Île-Perrot)
- École Léopold-Carrière (Les Coteaux)
- École Marguerite-Bourgeoys (Les Cèdres)
- École Notre-Dame-de-la-Garde (Notre-Dame-de-l'Île-Perrot)
- École Notre-Dame-de-Lorette (Pincourt)
- École Sainte-Madeleine (Vaudreuil-Dorion)
- École Sainte-Marthe (Sainte-Marthe) - integrated with École Cuillierrier
- École Saint-Michel (Vaudreuil-Dorion)
- École Saint-Thomas (Hudson)
- École Saint-Zotique - integrated with École de la Riveraine
- École Virginie-Roy (L'Île-Perrot)
- École des Étriers (Saint-Lazare)
