= Greater Montreal =

Metropolitan area in Quebec, Canada

Coordinates: 45.56°N 73.66°W

Greater Montreal Grand Montréal (French)
- Metropolitan area
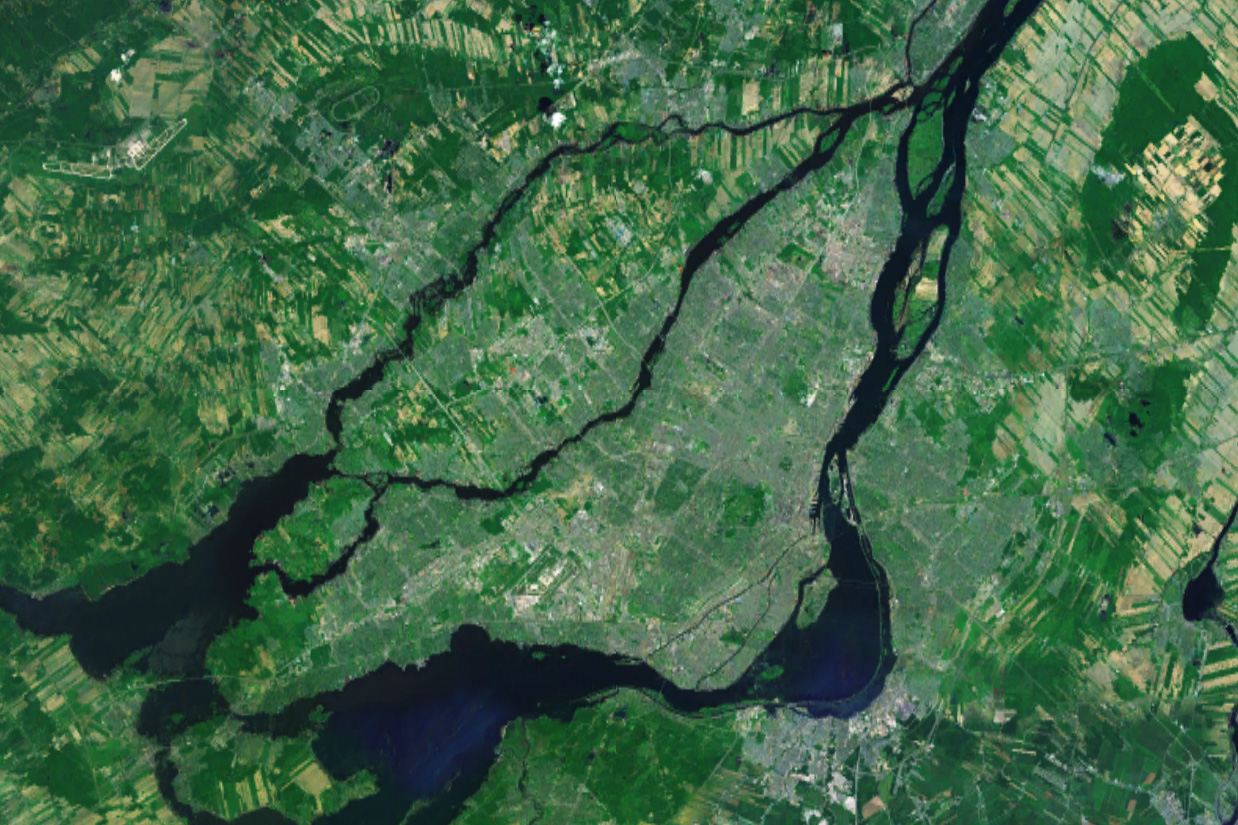
Interactive Map of Greater Montreal
City of Montreal / Ville de Montréal
City of Laval / Ville de Laval
City of Longueuil / Ville de Longueuil
Municipalities in both Montreal Census Metropolitan Area (CMA) and Montreal Metropolitan Community (MMC)
Municipalities in Montreal Census Metropolitan Area (CMA) but not in Montreal Metropolitan Community (MMC)
Municipalities not in Montreal Census Metropolitan Area (CMA) but in Montreal Metropolitan Community (MMC)
- Country: Canada
- Province: Québec

Area
  - Total: 4,739.04 km^{2} (1,829.75 sq mi)
  - Land: 4,258.31 km^{2} (1,644.14 sq mi)

Population (2021)
  - Total: 4,291,732
  - Estimate (2025): 4,597,837
  - Density: 1,007.85/km^{2} (2,610.3/sq mi)

GDP (nominal, 2022)
  - Total: CA$279 billion
- Time zone: UTC−5 (EST)
  - Summer (DST): UTC−4 (EDT)
- Postal code prefixes: H, J
- Area codes: 263, 354, 438, 450, 514, 579
- Greater Montreal shown in light blue, with the City of Montreal proper in dark blue.

Greater Montreal (French: Grand Montréal, [ɡʁɑ̃ mɔ̃ʁeal]) is the most populous metropolitan area in Quebec and the second most populous in Canada after Greater Toronto. In 2015, Statistics Canada identified Montreal's Census Metropolitan Area (CMA) as 4,258.31 square kilometres (1,644.14 mi^{2}) with a population of 4,027,100, almost 50% of the province.

A smaller area of 3,838 square kilometres (1,482 mi^{2}) is governed by the Montreal Metropolitan Community (MMC; French: Communauté métropolitaine de Montréal, CMM). This level of government is headed by a president (currently Montreal mayor Soraya Martinez Ferrada).

The inner ring is composed of densely populated municipalities located in close proximity to Downtown Montreal. It includes the entire Island of Montreal, Laval, and the Urban Agglomeration of Longueuil. Due to their proximity to Montreal's downtown core, some additional suburbs on the South Shore (Brossard, Saint-Lambert, and Boucherville) are usually included in the inner ring, despite their location on the mainland.

The outer ring is composed of low-density municipalities located on the fringe of Metropolitan Montreal. Most of these cities and towns are semi-rural. Specifically, the term banlieues hors de l'île (off-island suburbs) refers to those suburbs that are located on the North Shore of the Mille-Îles River, those on the South Shore that were never included in the megacity of Longueuil, and those on the Vaudreuil-Soulanges Peninsula.

== Largest cities ==
The largest cities in Greater Montreal
Rank	City	Region	Population (2021)	Land Area		Population Density	
Rank	City	Region	Population (2021)	km^{2}	mi^{2}	/km^{2}	/mi^{2}
1	Montreal	Montreal	1,762,949	364.74	140.83	4,833.5	12,519
2	Laval	Laval	438,366	246.13	95.03	1,781.0	4,613
3	Longueuil	Montérégie	254,483	115.77	44.70	2,198.2	5,693
4	Terrebonne	Lanaudière	119,944	153.76	59.37	780.1	2,020
5	Brossard	Montérégie	91,525	45.19	17.45	2,025.3	5,246
6	Repentigny	Lanaudière	86,100	61.52	23.75	1,399.6	3,625
7	Saint-Jérôme	Laurentides	80,213	90.18	34.82	889.5	2,304
8	Blainville	Laurentides	59,819	54.97	21.22	1,088.2	2,818
9	Mirabel	Laurentides	61,108	484.09	186.91	126.2	327
10	Dollard-des-Ormeaux	Montreal	48,403	14.98	5.78	3,230.2	8,366

== Cities and towns ==
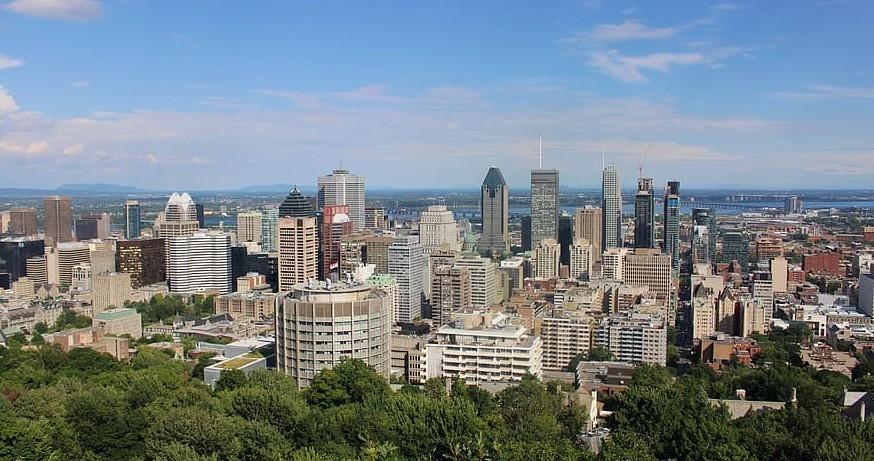
Montreal

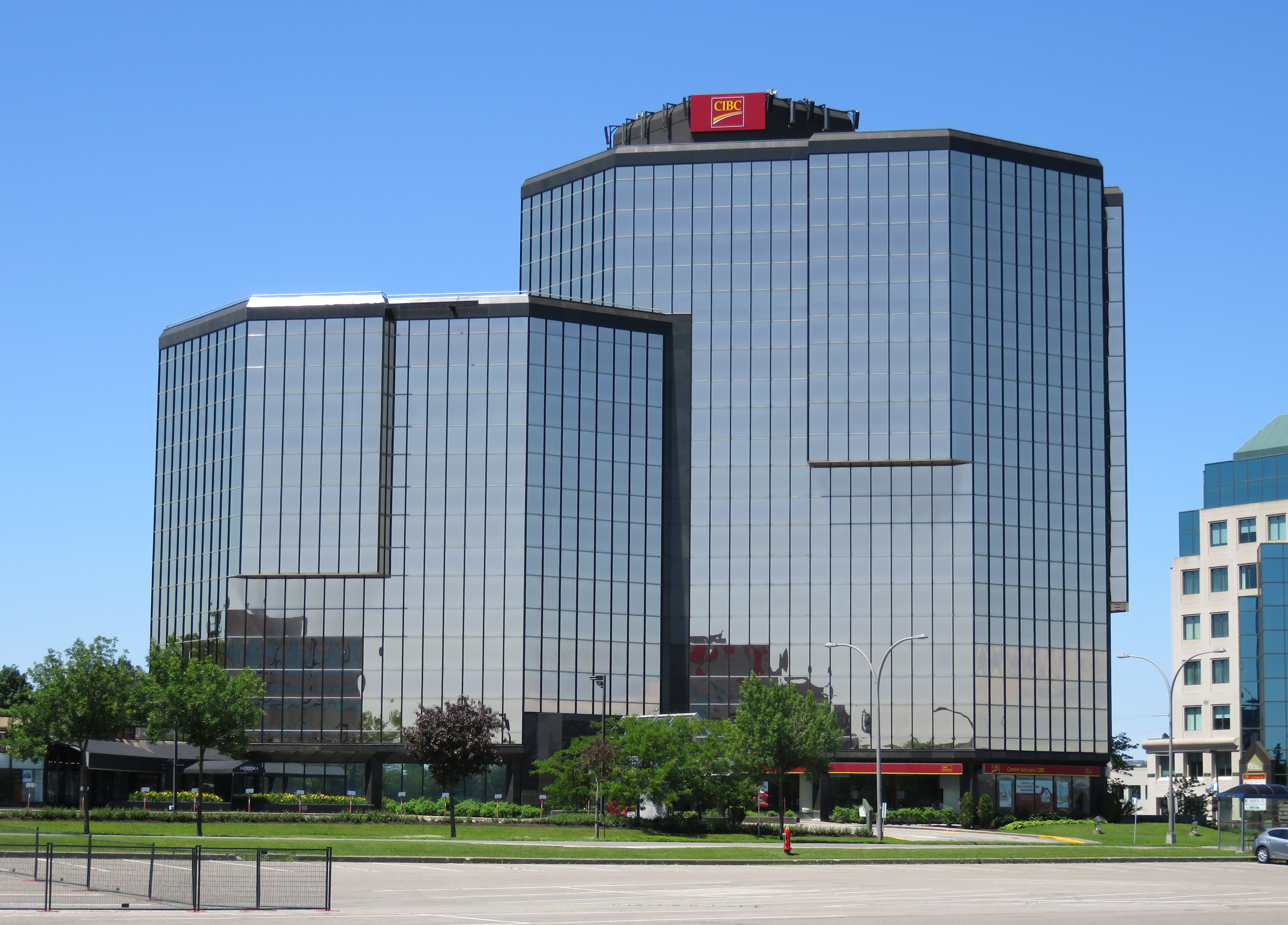
Laval

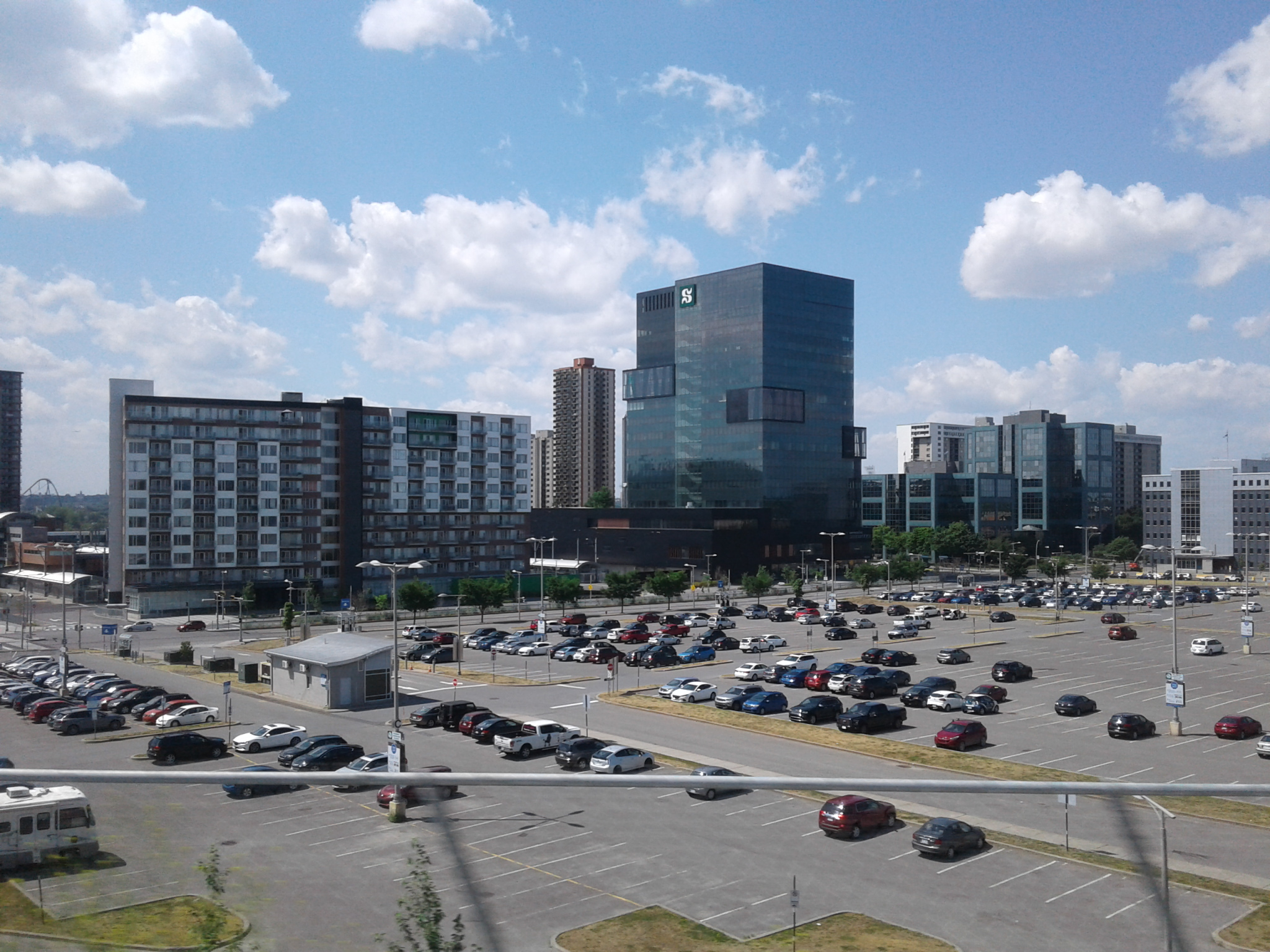
Longueuil

Logo of the Montreal Metropolitan Community

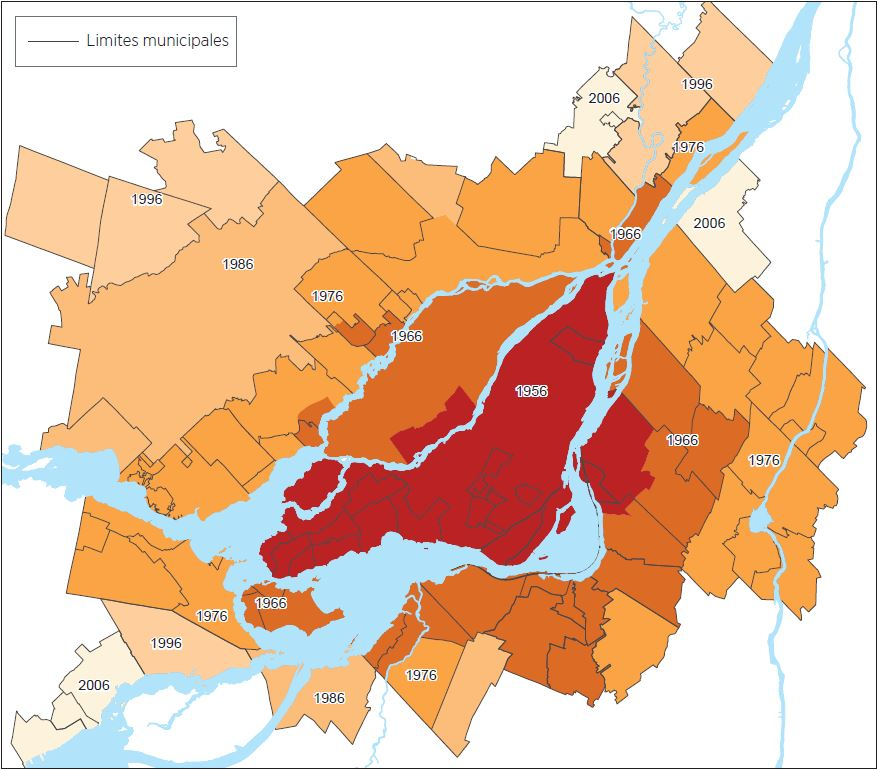
Greater Montreal Territorial Evolution

Municipalities in the Montreal Census Metropolitan Area (CMA) and the Montreal Metropolitan Community (MMC)
Area	Regional county municipality	Municipality	In CMA	In MMC
Urban agglomeration of Montreal		Baie-d'Urfé	✓	✓
Urban agglomeration of Montreal		Beaconsfield	✓	✓
Urban agglomeration of Montreal		Côte Saint-Luc	✓	✓
Urban agglomeration of Montreal		Dollard-des-Ormeaux	✓	✓
Urban agglomeration of Montreal		Dorval	✓	✓
Urban agglomeration of Montreal		Hampstead	✓	✓
Urban agglomeration of Montreal		Kirkland	✓	✓
Urban agglomeration of Montreal		L'Île-Dorval	✓	✓
Urban agglomeration of Montreal		Montreal (Note: subdivided into nineteen boroughs)	✓	✓
Urban agglomeration of Montreal		Montréal-Est	✓	✓
Urban agglomeration of Montreal		Montreal West	✓	✓
Urban agglomeration of Montreal		Mount Royal	✓	✓
Urban agglomeration of Montreal		Pointe-Claire	✓	✓
Urban agglomeration of Montreal		Sainte-Anne-de-Bellevue	✓	✓
Urban agglomeration of Montreal		Senneville	✓	✓
Urban agglomeration of Montreal		Westmount	✓	✓
Laval			✓	✓
Urban agglomeration of Longueuil		Boucherville	✓	✓
Urban agglomeration of Longueuil		Brossard	✓	✓
Urban agglomeration of Longueuil		Longueuil (Note: subdivided into the boroughs of Le Vieux-Longueuil, Saint-Hubert and Greenfield Park.)	✓	✓
Urban agglomeration of Longueuil		Saint-Lambert	✓	✓
Urban agglomeration of Longueuil		Saint-Bruno-de-Montarville	✓	✓
Laurentides	Deux-Montagnes (Note: Only a portion of municipalities in the MRC are included in the MMC.)	Deux-Montagnes	✓	✓
Laurentides	Deux-Montagnes	Oka	✓	✓
Laurentides	Deux-Montagnes	Pointe-Calumet	✓	✓
Laurentides	Deux-Montagnes	Saint-Eustache	✓	✓
Laurentides	Deux-Montagnes	Saint-Joseph-du-Lac	✓	✓
Laurentides	Deux-Montagnes	Sainte-Marthe-sur-le-Lac	✓	✓
Laurentides	Deux-Montagnes	Saint-Placide	✓	✗
Laurentides	Thérèse-De Blainville	Blainville	✓	✓
Laurentides	Thérèse-De Blainville	Bois-des-Filion	✓	✓
Laurentides	Thérèse-De Blainville	Boisbriand	✓	✓
Laurentides	Thérèse-De Blainville	Lorraine	✓	✓
Laurentides	Thérèse-De Blainville	Rosemère	✓	✓
Laurentides	Thérèse-De Blainville	Sainte-Anne-des-Plaines	✓	✓
Laurentides	Thérèse-De Blainville	Sainte-Thérèse	✓	✓
Laurentides	(Note: classified as an equivalent territory)	Mirabel	✓	✓
Laurentides	Argenteuil	Gore	✓	✗
Laurentides	La Rivière-du-Nord	Saint-Colomban	✓	✗
Laurentides	La Rivière-du-Nord	Saint-Jérôme (Note: in area served by the Réseau de transport métropolitain)	✓	✗
Lanaudière	L'Assomption	Charlemagne	✓	✓
Lanaudière	L'Assomption	L'Assomption	✓	✓
Lanaudière	L'Assomption	L'Épiphanie	✓	✗
Lanaudière	L'Assomption	Repentigny	✓	✓
Lanaudière	L'Assomption	Saint-Sulpice	✓	✓
Lanaudière	Les Moulins	Mascouche	✓	✓
Lanaudière	Les Moulins	Terrebonne	✓	✓
Lanaudière	Joliette	Joliette Crabtree Notre-Dame-des-Prairies Saint-Charles-Borromée	✓	
Lanaudière	D'Autray	Lavaltrie	✓	✗
Lanaudière	Montcalm (Note: Only a portion of municipalities in the MRC are included in the CMA.)	Saint-Lin–Laurentides	✓	✗
Montérégie	Beauharnois-Salaberry	Beauharnois	✓	✓
Montérégie	La Vallée-du-Richelieu	Beloeil	✓	✓
Montérégie	La Vallée-du-Richelieu	Carignan	✓	✓
Montérégie	La Vallée-du-Richelieu	Chambly	✓	✓
Montérégie	La Vallée-du-Richelieu	McMasterville	✓	✓
Montérégie	La Vallée-du-Richelieu	Mont-Saint-Hilaire	✓	✓
Montérégie	La Vallée-du-Richelieu	Otterburn Park	✓	✓
Montérégie	La Vallée-du-Richelieu	Saint-Basile-le-Grand	✓	✓
Montérégie	La Vallée-du-Richelieu	Saint-Jean-Baptiste	✗	✓
Montérégie	La Vallée-du-Richelieu	Saint-Mathieu-de-Beloeil	✓	✓
Montérégie	Marguerite-D'Youville	Calixa-Lavallée	✗	✓
Montérégie	Marguerite-D'Youville	Contrecœur	✗	✓
Montérégie	Marguerite-D'Youville	Saint-Amable	✓	✓
Montérégie	Marguerite-D'Youville	Sainte-Julie	✓	✓
Montérégie	Marguerite-D'Youville	Varennes	✓	✓
Montérégie	Marguerite-D'Youville	Verchères	✓	✓
Montérégie	Roussillon	Candiac	✓	✓
Montérégie	Roussillon	Châteauguay	✓	✓
Montérégie	Roussillon	Delson	✓	✓
Montérégie	Roussillon	La Prairie	✓	✓
Montérégie	Roussillon	Léry	✓	✓
Montérégie	Roussillon	Mercier	✓	✓
Montérégie	Roussillon	Sainte-Catherine	✓	✓
Montérégie	Roussillon	Saint-Constant	✓	✓
Montérégie	Roussillon	Saint-Isidore	✓	✓
Montérégie	Roussillon	Saint-Mathieu	✓	✓
Montérégie	Roussillon	Saint-Philippe	✓	✓
Montérégie	Rouville	Richelieu	✓	✓
Montérégie	Rouville	Saint-Mathias-sur-Richelieu	✓	✓
Montérégie	Vaudreuil-Soulanges	Coteau-du-Lac	✓	✗
Montérégie	Vaudreuil-Soulanges	Hudson	✓	✓
Montérégie	Vaudreuil-Soulanges	Les Cèdres	✓	✓
Montérégie	Vaudreuil-Soulanges	Les Coteaux	✓	✗
Montérégie	Vaudreuil-Soulanges	L'Île-Cadieux	✓	✓
Montérégie	Vaudreuil-Soulanges	L'Île-Perrot	✓	✓
Montérégie	Vaudreuil-Soulanges	Notre-Dame-de-l'Île-Perrot	✓	✓
Montérégie	Vaudreuil-Soulanges	Pincourt	✓	✓
Montérégie	Vaudreuil-Soulanges	Pointe-des-Cascades	✓	✓
Montérégie	Vaudreuil-Soulanges	Saint-Lazare	✓	✓
Montérégie	Vaudreuil-Soulanges	Saint-Zotique	✓	✗
Montérégie	Vaudreuil-Soulanges	Terrasse-Vaudreuil	✓	✓
Montérégie	Vaudreuil-Soulanges	Vaudreuil-Dorion	✓	✓
Montérégie	Vaudreuil-Soulanges	Vaudreuil-sur-le-Lac	✓	✓
Montérégie	Le Haut-Richelieu	Saint-Jean-sur-Richelieu	✓	✗

Only a portion of the municipalities and MRC's located in geographical entities highlighted in light gray are part of the CMM/CMA.
There are 82 municipalities that are part of the MMC and 91 municipalities that are part of the CMA.
There are 79 municipalities that overlap between the two, with 3 municipalities being part of the MMC but not the CMA, and 12 municipalities being part of the CMA but not the MMC.
Kanesatake and Kahnawake are not included in the previous counts.

== Demographics ==
Historical populations
Year	Pop.	±%
1871	174,090	—
1881	223,512	+28.4%
1891	308,169	+37.9%
1901	393,665	+27.7%
1911	594,812	+51.1%
1921	774,330	+30.2%
1931	1,064,448	+37.5%
1941	1,192,235	+12.0%
1951	1,539,308	+29.1%
1956	1,745,001	+13.4%
1961	2,110,679	+21.0%
1966	2,570,985	+21.8%
1971	2,743,208	+6.7%
1976	2,802,485	+2.2%
1981	2,862,286	+2.1%
1986	2,921,357	+2.1%
1991	3,208,970	+9.8%
1996	3,326,510	+3.7%
2001	3,426,350	+3.0%
2006	3,635,571	+6.1%
2011	3,824,221	+5.2%
2016	4,098,927	+7.2%
2021	4,291,732	+4.7%

=== Ethnicity ===
Panethnic groups in Metro Montreal (2001−2021)
Panethnic group	2021		2016		2011		2006		2001	
Panethnic group	Pop.	%	Pop.	%	Pop.	%	Pop.	%	Pop.	%
European (Note: 2001-2016: Statistic includes all persons that did not make up part of a visible minority or an indigenous identity. 2021: Statistic includes all persons belonging to the non-indigenous and non-visible minority "White" population group.)	3,059,895	72.74%	3,070,210	76.57%	2,963,860	78.98%	2,980,280	83.05%	2,911,230	86.11%
African	340,140	8.09%	270,940	6.76%	216,310	5.76%	169,065	4.71%	139,305	4.12%
Middle Eastern (Note: Statistic includes total responses of "West Asian" and "Arab" under visible minority section on census.)	285,615	6.79%	220,055	5.49%	172,345	4.59%	113,405	3.16%	79,410	2.35%
Latin American	137,850	3.28%	110,195	2.75%	98,010	2.61%	75,400	2.1%	53,155	1.57%
South Asian	121,260	2.88%	85,925	2.14%	79,540	2.12%	70,615	1.97%	57,935	1.71%
East Asian (Note: Statistic includes total responses of "Chinese", "Korean", and "Japanese" under visible minority section on census.)	116,820	2.78%	100,265	2.5%	83,420	2.22%	79,665	2.22%	58,165	1.72%
Southeast Asian (Note: Statistic includes total responses of "Filipino" and "Southeast Asian" under visible minority section on census.)	101,560	2.41%	88,755	2.21%	89,645	2.39%	68,475	1.91%	57,460	1.7%
Indigenous	46,085	1.1%	34,745	0.87%	26,285	0.7%	17,865	0.5%	11,085	0.33%
Other (Note: Statistic includes total responses of "Visible minority, n.i.e." and "Multiple visible minorities" under visible minority section on census.)	40,565	0.96%	28,710	0.72%	23,060	0.61%	13,755	0.38%	12,900	0.38%
Total responses	4,206,455	98.01%	4,009,795	97.83%	3,752,470	98.12%	3,588,520	98.71%	3,380,645	98.67%
Total population	4,291,732	100%	4,098,927	100%	3,824,221	100%	3,635,571	100%	3,426,350	100%

- Note: Totals greater than 100% due to multiple origin responses.

=== Language ===
Mother tongue (2011)
Language	Greater Montreal	Quebec	Canada
French	65.9%	79.1%	21.4%
English	13.2%	8.9%	58.1%
Arabic	4.5%	2.1%	1.1%
Spanish	3.2%	1.8%	1.3%
Italian	2.7%	1.6%	1.3%
Creole	1.5%	0.8%	0.2%
Mandarin	1.0%	0.1%	1.8%
Greek	1.0%	0.5%	0.4%
Romanian	0.8%	0.4%	0.3%
Portuguese	0.8%	0.5%	0.7%
Russian	0.7%	0.3%	0.5%
Vietnamese	0.7%	0.4%	0.5%
Persian (Farsi)	0.6%	0.3%	0.5%
Cantonese	0.6%	0.1%	1.7%
Tagalog (Filipino)	0.5%	0.2%	1.2%
Armenian	0.4%	0.2%	0.1%
Tamil	0.4%	0.2%	0.4%
Punjabi (Panjabi)	0.3%	0.2%	1.4%
Polish	0.3%	0.2%	0.6%
Bengali	0.3%	0.1%	0.2%
German	0.3%	0.2%	1.3%
Urdu	0.3%	0.1%	0.6%
Yiddish	0.2%	0.1%	<0.1%
Cambodian (Khmer)	0.2%	0.1%	<0.1%
Turkish	0.2%	0.1%	0.1%
Gujarati	0.2%	0.1%	0.3%
Hungarian	0.2%	0.1%	0.2%
Bulgarian	0.2%	0.1%	0.1%
Berber (Kabyle)	0.2%	0.1%	<0.1%
Unspecified Chinese	<0.1%	0.1%	0.1%

== Transportation ==
Exo operates the region's commuter rail and metropolitan bus services, and is the second busiest such system in Canada after Toronto's GO Transit. Established in June 2007, Exo's commuter rail system has six lines linking the downtown core with communities as far west as Hudson, as Far south as Mont-Saint-Hilaire, as far east as Mascouche, and as far north as Saint-Jérôme.

Along with Exo, a sister agency, the Autorité régionale de transport métropolitain (ARTM) plans, integrates, and coordinates public transport across Greater Montreal, including the Island of Montreal, Laval (Île Jésus), and communities along both the north shore of the Rivière des Mille-Îles and the south shore of the Saint Lawrence River. The ARTM's mandate also includes the management of reserved High-occupancy vehicle lanes, metropolitan bus terminuses, park-and-ride lots, and a budget of $163 million, which is shared amongst the transit corporations and inter-municipal public transit organizations.

The Exo/ARTM's territory spans 63 municipalities and one native reserve, 13 regional county municipalities, and 21 transit authorities. It serves a population of approximately 3.7 million people who make more than 750,000 trips daily.

The major transit commissions under the ARTM are:

- Société de transport de Montréal (English: Montreal Transit Corporation), serving the Island of Montreal
- Société de transport de Laval (English: Laval Transit Corporation), serving the city of Laval
- Réseau de transport de Longueuil (English: Longueuil Transit Network), serving the Urban agglomeration of Longueuil

== Education ==
Postsecondary educational institutions in the Greater Montreal Area
Universities	CEGEPs and other colleges	Other schools
McGill University; Concordia University; Université de Montréal; Université du Québec à Montréal; Université de Sherbrooke (Longueuil); École de technologie supérieure; École des hautes études commerciales; École Polytechnique de Montréal; Institut national de la recherche scientifique	Cégep André-Laurendeau; Cégep Marie-Victorin; Cégep de Saint-Laurent; Cégep du Vieux-Montréal; Cégep régional de Lanaudière; Champlain College Saint-Lambert (Saint-Lambert); Collège Ahuntsic; Collège de Bois-de-Boulogne; Collège Édouard-Montpetit (Longueuil); Collège Gérald-Godin (Sainte-Geneviève); Collège Jean-de-Brébeuf; Collège Lionel-Groulx (Sainte-Thérèse); Collège de Maisonneuve; College Montmorency (Laval); Collège de Rosemont; Dawson College (Westmount); Herzing College; John Abbott College (Sainte-Anne-de-Bellevue); LaSalle College; Marianopolis College (Westmount); Vanier College; Collège de Valleyfield (Salaberry-de-Valleyfield)	Lambda School of Music and Fine Arts; National Theatre School of Canada; Rabbinical College of Canada; School of Italian Giovanni Pascoli; L'Académie de sécurité IGS

(In Montreal, except where otherwise noted.)

== See also ==
- Montreal Urban Community

== Notes ==
Group 1

Group 2

Group 3
