= Viviry River =

Location
- Country: Canada
- Province: Quebec
- Region: Montérégie
- RCM: Vaudreuil-Soulanges

Physical characteristics
- Source: Rivers
  - location: Hudson
  - coordinates: 45.443139°N 74.185256°W
- Mouth: Lac des Deux Montagnes
  - location: Hudson
- Length: < 10 km (6.2 mi)

Basin features
- River system: Kichissippi
- Landmarks: Hudson

The Viviry River is a river that runs through the municipalities of Saint-Lazare, Vaudreuil-Dorion and Hudson in Quebec, Canada and empties out into the lac des Deux Montagnes, at Sandy Beach and Parsons Point. The physiographic unit is known as the Viviry River Valley.

== Origin of name ==
The name that the Anishinaabe gave to this river is unknown. The current name of the river is for the family of Marcellin Farand dit Vivaret who first settled on lot 3 in the 1st concession above Point Cavagnal in 1750. His son, Paul Vivarais was the first colonial occupant of lot 24 in the Seigneur’s terrier (lot 24 being where the Viviry river has its mouth). The variations in spelling the river’s name Vivaret, Viviri, Vivri, Vivivery. The name Viviry was made official in 1968. Previous to that time it was known as Rivière Vivarais.

== Flora and fauna ==
From the top to the bottom the Viviry is rich with a strong diversity of species and forest types. Its source is in the forested bog of the Saint-Lazare plateau, then runs through the Wetland plain and oldfield habitat shared between the municipalities of Vaudreuil-Dorion and Saint-Lazare. It winds its way around the south facing slopes of Hudson until it reaches Parc nature Sandy Beach Sandy Beach hosts a variety of species such as (North American beavers, map turtles, foxes, heron and deer as well as a fragile flora growing beneath old growth eastern hemlock and a floodplain ecology over the majority of the site. The Viviry River valley watershed great ecological interest due to the number and quality of wetlands that should be preserved for future generations.

== See also ==
- Montérégie
- Lac des Deux Montagnes
- Hudson, Quebec
- Saint-Lazare, Quebec
- Vaudreuil-Dorion
