= Les Cèdres, Quebec =

Les Cèdres
- Municipality
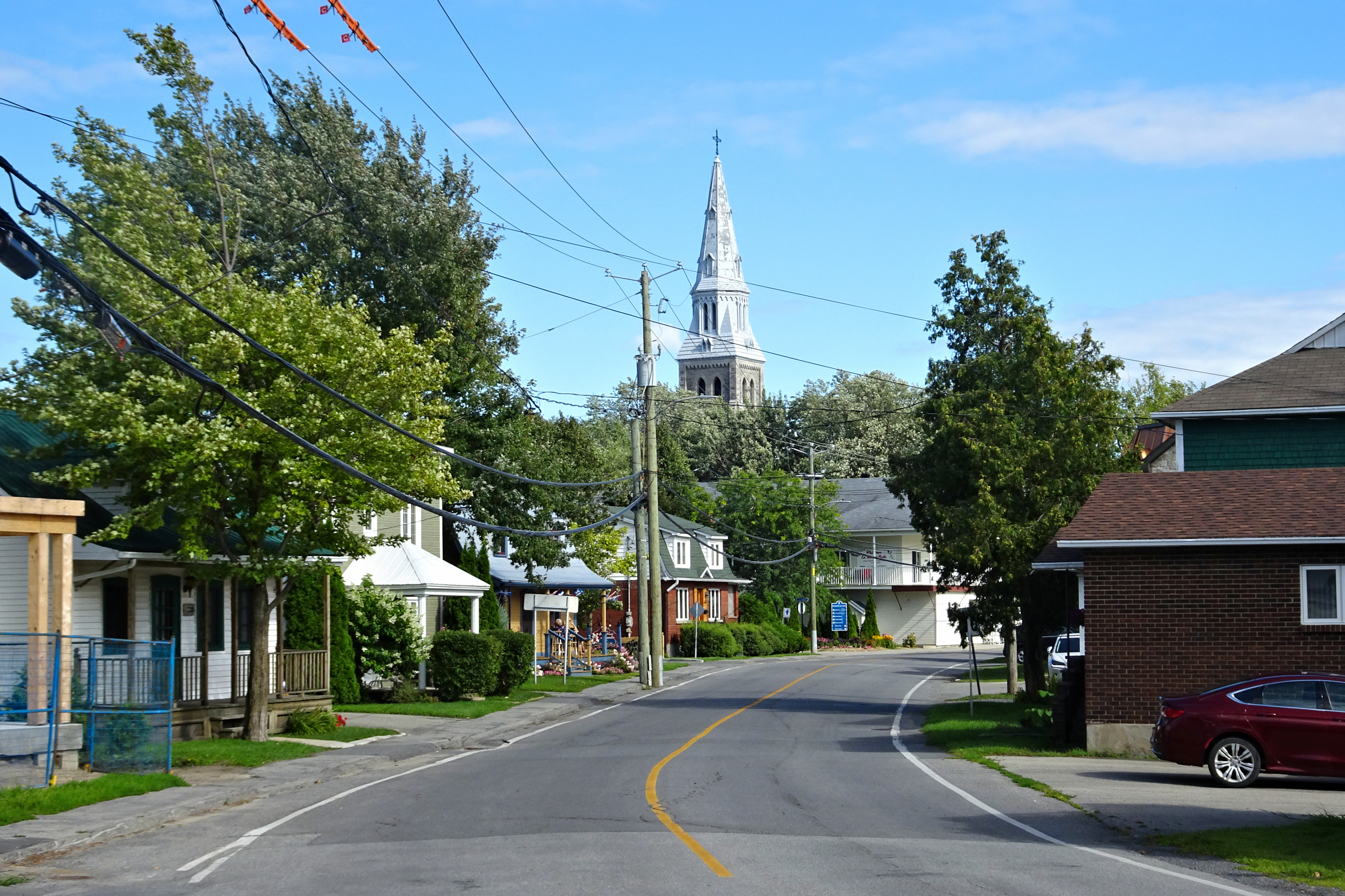

- Coat of arms
- Motto: Credo cresco
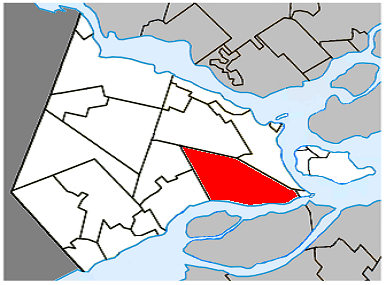
- Location within Vaudreuil-Soulanges RCM

- Location in southern Quebec
- Coordinates: 45°18′N 74°03′W
- Country: Canada
- Province: Quebec
- Region: Montérégie
- RCM: Vaudreuil-Soulanges
- Constituted: March 9, 1985

Government
  - Mayor: Michel Proulx
  - Federal riding: Beauharnois—Salaberry—Soulanges—Huntingdon
  - Prov. riding: Soulanges

Area
  - Municipality: 88.50 km^{2} (34.17 sq mi)
  - Land: 77.63 km^{2} (29.97 sq mi)
  - Urban: 1.79 km^{2} (0.69 sq mi)

Population (2021)
  - Municipality: 7,184
  - Density: 92.5/km^{2} (240/sq mi)
  - Urban: 2,214
  - Urban density: 1,240.2/km^{2} (3,212/sq mi)
  - Pop 2016-2021: ▲6%
  - Dwellings: 2,810
- Time zone: UTC−5 (EST)
  - Summer (DST): UTC−4 (EDT)
- Postal code(s): J7T 1A1
- Area codes: 450 and 579
- Highways A-20 A-30: R-338; R-340
- Website: www.ville.lescedres.qc.ca

Les Cèdres (French pronunciation: [le sɛdʁ]) is a municipality located north of the Saint Lawrence River in the Montérégie of Quebec, Canada, near Vaudreuil-Dorion. The population as of the Canada 2021 Census was 7,184. The name means "The Cedars" in French.

There is an extensive rapid on the St. Lawrence River at this location. During the American Revolution, the Battle of the Cedars was fought in the vicinity. In 1959-1960 Swedish writer, Stig Claesson, lived in the village at a place called Point Charlie and later wrote a book about it called My friend Charlie.

== History ==
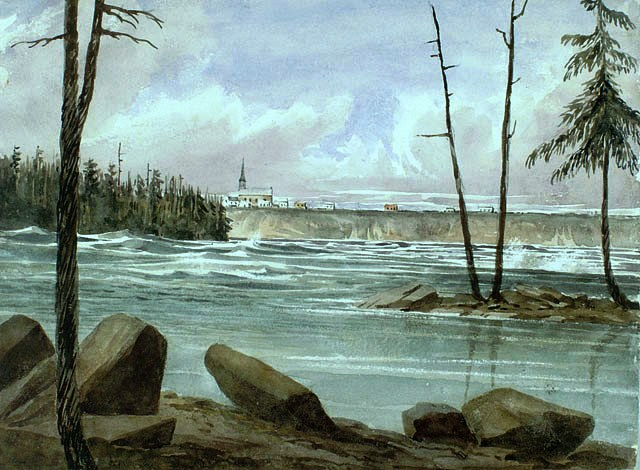
Cedars Rapids, 1840

This location was already notable in the late 17th century because of the large rapids on the St. Lawrence River, marked by tall cedars (French: les cèdres) that grew there in abundance. Hence, the location was originally known as Cedars Rapids, or as mentioned by cartographer Deshayes in 1695, as Rapide du Costeau des Cèdres. Subsequently, it was also known as Coteau-des-Cèdres, Portage-du-Coteau-des-Cèdres, or just Les Cèdres. Numerous explorers and military expeditions passed there to portage around the rapids. It was first settled in 1715.

In 1845, the Parish Municipality of Saint-Joseph-de-Soulanges was created (named in honour of Joseph-Dominique-Emmanuel Le Moyne de Longueuil, Seigneur of Soulanges), followed by the Village Municipality of Soulange in 1852.

In 1967, the Village Municipality of Soulange was renamed to Les Cèdres. In 1985, Les Cèdres and Saint-Joseph-de-Soulanges were merged to form the current Municipality of Les Cèdres.

== Demographics ==
Canada census – Les Cèdres community profile

	2021	2016	2011
Population	7,184 (+6.0% from 2016)	6,777 (+11.5% from 2011)	6,079 (+6.1% from 2006)
Land area	77.63 km^{2} (29.97 sq mi)	77.71 km^{2} (30.00 sq mi)	77.85 km^{2} (30.06 sq mi)
Population density	92.5/km^{2} (240/sq mi)	87.2/km^{2} (226/sq mi)	78.1/km^{2} (202/sq mi)
Median age	41.2 (M: 41.2, F: 41.2)	39.5 (M: 39.6, F: 39.4)	38.8 (M: 38.6, F: 39.1)
Private dwellings	2,810 (total) 2,754 (occupied)	2,693 (total)	2,408 (total)
Median household income	$98,000	$81,829	$76,394

References: 2021 2016 2011

Historical Census Data - Les Cèdres, Quebec

Year	Pop.	±%
1986	3,321	—
1991	3,836	+15.5%
1996	4,641	+21.0%
2001	5,128	+10.5%

Year	Pop.	±%
2006	5,732	+11.8%
2011	6,079	+6.1%
2016	6,777	+11.5%
2021	7,184	+6.0%

Population amounts prior to 1985 are total of Les Cèdres (VL) and Saint-Joseph-de-Soulanges (P).
Source: Statistics Canada

=== Language ===
Canada Census Mother Tongue - Les Cèdres, Quebec
Census	Total	French			English			French & English			Other		
Year	Responses	Count	Trend	Pop %	Count	Trend	Pop %	Count	Trend	Pop %	Count	Trend	Pop %
2021	7,155	5,910	▲0.9%	82.6%	665	▲20.9%	9.3%	190	▲123.5%	2.7%	330	▲46.7%	4.6%
2016	6,755	5,855	▲9.2%	86.7%	550	▲17.0%	8.1%	85	▲6.3%	1.3%	225	▲66.7%	3.3%
2011	6,045	5,360	▲3.6%	88.7%	470	▲34.3%	7.8%	80	▲14.3%	1.3%	135	▲8.0%	2.2%
2006	5,720	5,175	▲11.3%	90.5%	350	▲27.3%	6.1%	70	▼41.7%	1.2%	125	▲78.6%	2.2%
2001	5,115	4,650	▲10.1%	90.9%	275	▲3.8%	5.4%	120	▲166.7%	2.3%	70	▼26.3%	1.4%
1996	4,630	4,225	n/a	91.3%	265	n/a	5.7%	45	n/a	1.0%	95	n/a	2.1%

== Government ==
List of former mayors (since formation of current municipality):

- Joseph Adolphe Jean Paul Séguin (1985–1987)
- Joseph Osie Armand Levac (1987–1994)
- Lucien Daoust (1994–2002)
- Géraldine Tremblay Quesnel (2002–2013)
- Raymond Larouche (2013–2021)
- Bernard Daoust (2021–2025)
- Michel Proulx (2025–present)

== Infrastructure ==
The west end of Quebec Autoroute 30, a Montreal Island bypass route, runs through this area to link up with Autoroute 20. Montréal/Les Cèdres Airport, a single-runway general aviation airport, is located north of Quebec Autoroute 20 in the Les Cèdres area.

== Education ==
Commission Scolaire des Trois-Lacs operates Francophone schools.

- École Marguerite-Bourgeoys
- Some areas are served by École Du Papillon-Bleu (pavillons Saint-Jean-Baptiste and Sainte-Trinité) in Vaudreuil-Dorion and by École Des Étriers in Saint-Lazare

Lester B. Pearson School Board operates Anglophone schools. It is zoned to Birchwood Elementary School and Evergreen Elementary School in Saint-Lazare and St. Patrick Elementary School in Pincourt.

== See also ==
- List of anglophone communities in Quebec
- List of municipalities in Quebec
