= Area codes 514, 438, and 263 =

Telephone area codes for Montreal

Coordinates: 45°30′N 73°40′W

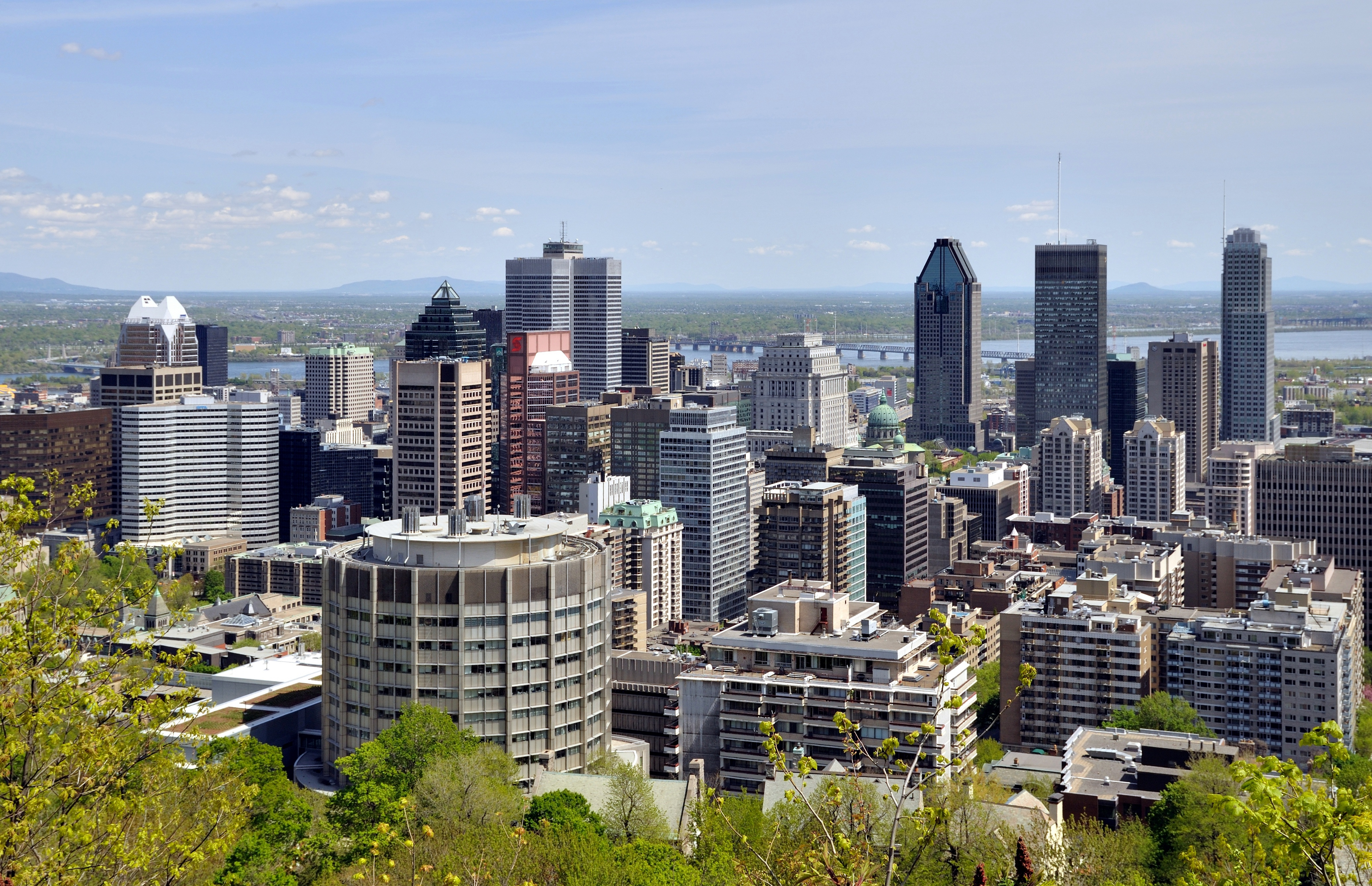
Montreal

Area codes 514, 438, and 263 are telephone area codes of the North American Numbering Plan (NANP) for Montreal and most of its on-island suburbs, specifically the Island of Montreal and Île Perrot in the Canadian province of Quebec.

Area code 514 was one of the original North American area codes assigned by AT&T in 1947. The original numbering plan area (NPA) was split twice: in 1957 to create area code 819 and in 1998 to create area code 450. In 2006, the entire remaining 514 area was assigned a second area code, 438, in an overlay plan that made ten-digit dialling mandatory in the Montreal area. Area code 263 was added to the overlay in October 2022.

The incumbent local exchange carrier (ILEC) in the service area is Bell Canada. The major competitive local exchange carriers (CLECs) are Vidéotron, Telus, and Rogers.

== History ==
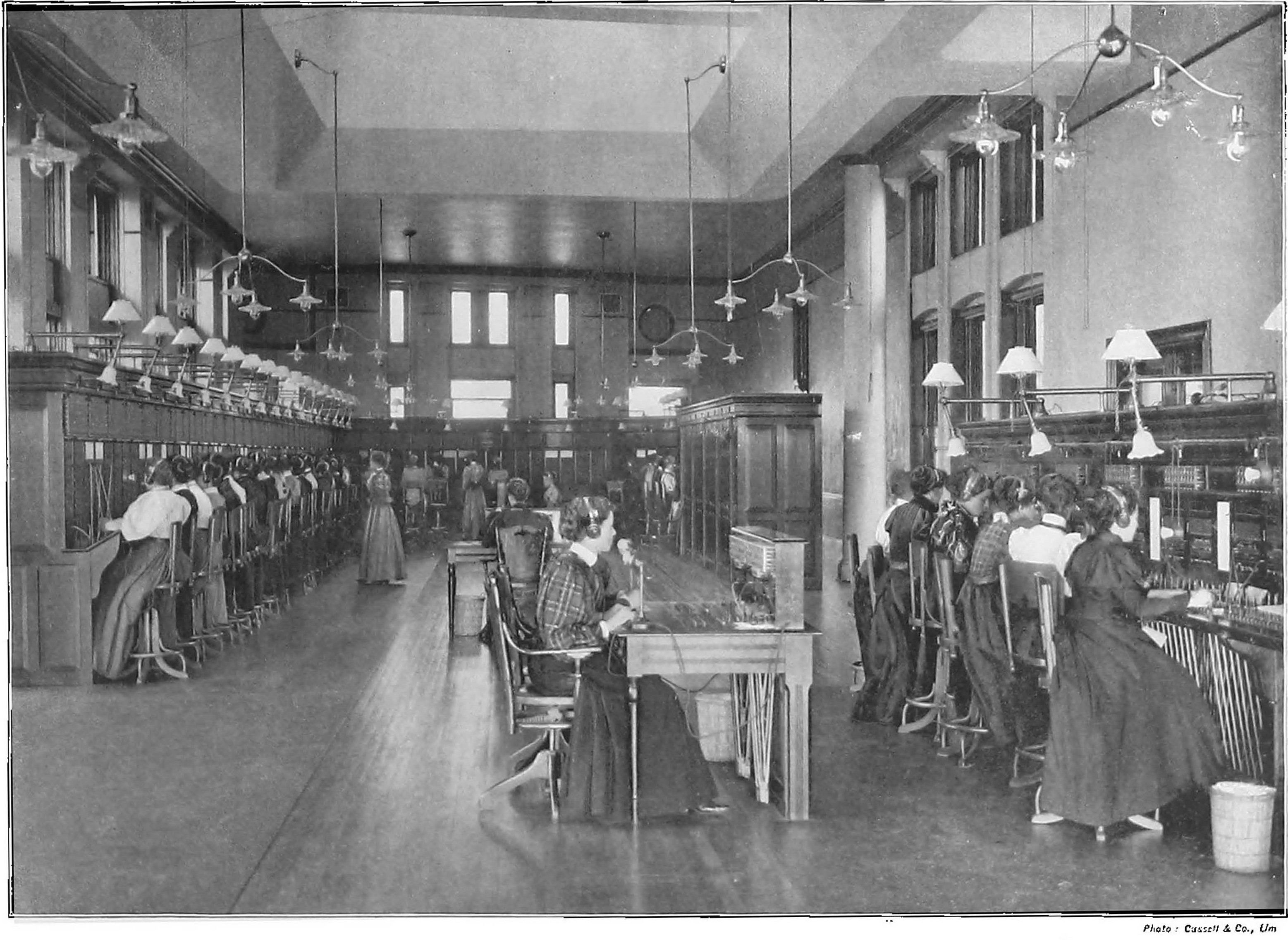
Bell exchange, Montreal, late 1890s

When Montreal's local calls were handled manually by operators, the caller requested the destination by name, before the first (four-digit) local telephone numbers were assigned in July 1881. In 1898, exchange names Main, Westmount, Uptown, and East, were added before the number. The initial rotary dial exchange, Lancaster, was deployed on April 25, 1925. Subscribers dialled two letters of an exchange name and four digits (2L+4N) and so "Lancaster 1234" was dialled as LA-1234 (52-1234).

Evolution of area codes in Ontario and southwestern Quebec

The initial area codes were created in 1947 as routing codes for operator-assisted calls. Quebec and Ontario were the only provinces that received multiple area codes. Quebec was split between area codes 514 and 418. Area code 514 was originally assigned to the entire western half of Quebec from the Canada–US border to the Hudson Strait. The area nominally included several remote areas in the far northern portion of the province that at the time did not have telephone service. When the Bell System implemented direct distance dialling (DDD) for content-wide service using a seven-digit local telephone number, prefixed by a three-digit area code, Montreal and Toronto, the largest Canadian cities, still used six-digit (2L-4N) numbering plans. Between 1951 and 1958, telephone numbers were lengthened by adding one digit (2L-5N) to be compatible. Numbering plan area code 514 was split in 1957 to create area code 819 for most of western Quebec, from Estrie (Sherbrooke) to the Ontario border, with the unserved far northern portion nominally added to 418 (and later moved to 819). Area code 514 was reduced to the region surrounding Montreal.

That configuration remained unchanged for 41 years. In 1998, the off-island suburbs (Laval, Montérégie, etc.) received area code 450, which now completely surrounds 514. That left 514 as the Island of Montreal and a few surrounding smaller islands, which makes it one of the six pairs of doughnut area codes in the numbering plan and one of two in Canada, the other being Toronto's area code 416.

The 1998 split was intended as a long-term solution to a shortage of available numbers in Canada's second-largest toll-free calling zone. However, within less than a decade, 514 was close to exhaustion because of the proliferation of computer, pager, and cell phone technologies. The problem was exacerbated by Canada's inefficient system of number allocation. Unlike the United States, Canada does not use number pooling as a relief measure. Every competing carrier is assigned blocks of 10,000 telephone numbers, which correspond to a single central office prefix, in every rate centre in which it plans to offer service. Once a telephone number is allocated to a carrier and rate centre, it cannot be reused elsewhere, even when a rate centre has more than enough numbers to serve it. That resulted in thousands of wasted telephone numbers. Many larger cities, especially "megacities" created late in the 20th century, are split between multiple rate centres which have never been amalgamated. Montreal is an exception; most of the suburban exchanges on the Island of Montreal were merged into the Montreal exchange with the 2002 creation of the "megacity" of Montreal. Long before then, it was Canada's second-largest rate centre.

The number allocation problem was not as severe in Montreal as in other areas of Canada. Due to Montreal's growth, numbers tended to be used up fairly quickly. However, it was not possible to assign numbers from the smaller suburban rate centres to Montreal. It became apparent that the area needed another area code. On November 4, 2006, numbering plan area 514 was overlaid with area code 438, which required ten-digit dialling for all subscribers in the Montreal area, even for local calls. By then, overlays had become the preferred relief measure in Canada, as they affect existing subscribers the least and provide a workaround for the number allocation problem. No area codes have been split in Canada since 1999.

Area code 438 was considered for overlaying 450 as well, but a later decision determined instead that 579 would be the overlay code.

In February 2017, area code 263 was reserved as the third area code in the region, and was placed in service on October 22, 2022. This effectively allocated 23.4 million numbers to a service area of roughly two million people.

== Service area ==
- Côte Saint-Luc, Hampstead, L'Île-Dorval, Montreal, Montréal-Est, Montreal West, Mount Royal, Westmount — most of (514)/(438) except as listed below
- Dollard-des-Ormeaux — (514) 309, 421, 472, 491, 533, 542, 545, 613, 615, 676, 683, 684, 685, 752, 763, 822 (438) 894
- Dorval — (514) 300, 307, 403, 420, 422, 469, 471, 492, 532, 538, 552, 556, 600, 631, 633, 634, 636, 637, 639, 780, 828, (438) 264, 600, 819, 891
- L'Île-Perrot, Notre-Dame-de-l'Île-Perrot, Pincourt, Terrasse-Vaudreuil — (514) 320, 425, 446, 453, 477, 478, 536, 539, 612, 646, 901, 902, (438) 257, 638, 700, 890
- Baie-d'Urfé, Beaconsfield, Kirkland, Pointe-Claire, Sainte-Anne-de-Bellevue, Senneville — (514) 319, 426, 427, 428, 457, 459, 500, 505, 534, 541, 558, 630, 671, 674, 693, 694, 695, 697, 782, 783, 900, (438) 265, 500, 538, 893

A few western Montreal neighbourhoods were never combined into the main Montreal rate centre and therefore have a reduced subset of the Montreal local calling area.

- Île Bizard, Pierrefonds, Roxboro, Sainte-Geneviève — (514) 305, 308, 479, 535, 547, 551, 565, 620, 624, 626, 675, 696, 700, 784, 785, (438) 818, 895
- Lachine — see Dorval

Quebec area codes: 367/418/581, 354/450/579, 263/438/514, 468/819/873
	North: 354/450/579	
West: 354/450/579	263/438/514	East: 354/450/579
	South: 354/450/579	
