= Christian Chagnon =

Canadian handball player (1956–2021)

Christian Chagnon (February 20, 1956 – December 9, 2021) was a Canadian handball player who competed in the 1976 Summer Olympics. Chagnon was born in Vaudreuil-Dorion, Quebec. He was part of the Canadian handball team, which finished eleventh in the 1976 Olympic tournament. He played all five matches and scored seven goals.
