= Saint-Clet, Quebec =

Saint-Clet
- Municipality
- Saint-Clet in 2026

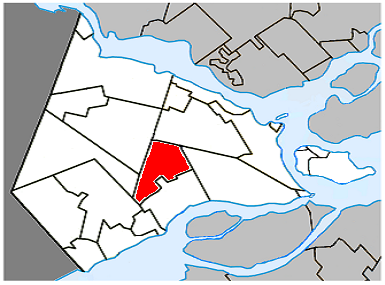
- Location within Vaudreuil-Soulanges RCM

- Location in southern Quebec
- Coordinates: 45°21′N 74°13′W
- Country: Canada
- Province: Quebec
- Region: Montérégie
- RCM: Vaudreuil-Soulanges
- Constituted: 31 August 1974

Government
  - Mayor: Mylène Labre
  - Federal riding: Salaberry—Suroît
  - Prov. riding: Soulanges

Area
  - Total: 39.10 km^{2} (15.10 sq mi)
  - Land: 39.32 km^{2} (15.18 sq mi)
- There is an apparent discrepancy between 2 authoritative sources.

Population (2021)
  - Total: 1,700
  - Density: 43.2/km^{2} (112/sq mi)
  - Pop 2016-2021: ▼4.4%
  - Dwellings: 728
- Time zone: UTC−5 (EST)
  - Summer (DST): UTC−4 (EDT)
- Postal code(s): J0P 1S0
- Area codes: 450 and 579
- Highways: R-201; R-340
- Website: st-clet.com

Saint-Clet (French pronunciation: [sɛ̃ klɛt]) is a municipality located in the Vaudreuil-Soulanges Regional County Municipality within the Montérégie region of Quebec, Canada. The population as of the 2021 Canadian census was 1,700, 1,734. Completely surrounded by agricultural land (mostly corn fields), the town is centred on the intersection of two main provincial highways. The north–south Route 201 is known as rue Principale within the town limits, and the east–west Route 340 is known as Boulevard de la Cité des Jeunes.

== History ==
The parish of Saint-Clet was established in 1849 by its detachment from the parish of Saint-Ignace-du-Coteau-du-Lac at the request of residents who had to go all the way to Coteau-du-Lac to attend mass. The first resident pastor of Saint-Clet was appointed in 1851 and four years later in 1855, the Parish Municipality of Saint-Clet was created.

There were some mergers and demergers of territory over the ensuing years until August 31, 1974, when the current municipality of Saint-Clet was created through the merger of the Parish and Village Municipalities of Saint-Clet.

The Canadian composer and music educator, Achille Fortier, was born in Saint-Clet in 1864.

=== Events in the news ===
On 17 February 1954, a collision of two Canadian Pacific trains took place in Saint-Clet. It was a time when train travel was quite popular, and it was common for a train to travel in two separate sections. The impact occurred when the second section of the Toronto-Montreal train rear-ended the first section at the village station, where it had stopped because of a snowstorm. The accident caused one death and 73 injuries.

Another event occurred on 14 March 1985, when heavy rains caused flooding, resulting in the evacuation of many homes. Heavy flooding again affected the town on 8 April 2014, when light rains and abruptly mild temperatures resulted in the rapid melting of a large volume of snow in a short period of time. The elevated railbed passing east–west through the town forms an artificial berm, impeding the flow of meltwater runoff from north to south. With only a couple of culverts to let the runoff go under the railbed, they were quickly overwhelmed and many basements north of the tracks were flooded.

== Demographics ==
Canada census – Saint-Clet, Quebec community profile

	2021	2016	2011
Population	1,700 (-4.4% from 2016)	1,779 (2.4% from 2011)	1,738 (+0.8% from 2006)
Land area	39.32 km^{2} (15.18 sq mi)	39.32 km^{2} (15.18 sq mi)	39.21 km^{2} (15.14 sq mi)
Population density	43.2/km^{2} (112/sq mi)	45.2/km^{2} (117/sq mi)	44.3/km^{2} (115/sq mi)
Median age	40.4 (M: 40.8, F: 40.4)	39.4 (M: 39.2, F: 39.8)	39.0 (M: 39.2, F: 38.8)
Private dwellings	728 (total)	727 (total)	710 (total)
Median household income	$78,000	$65,707	$58,562

References: 2021 2016 2011

Historical Census Data - Saint-Clet, Quebec

Year	Pop.	±%
1976	1,062	—
1981	1,101	+3.7%
1986	1,127	+2.4%
1991	1,388	+23.2%
1996	1,524	+9.8%

Year	Pop.	±%
2001	1,586	+4.1%
2006	1,725	+8.8%
2011	1,738	+0.8%
2016	1,779	+2.4%
2021	1,700	−4.4%

Source: Statistics Canada

=== Language ===
Canada Census Mother Tongue - Saint-Clet, Quebec
Census	Total	French			English			French & English			Other		
Year	Responses	Count	Trend	Pop %	Count	Trend	Pop %	Count	Trend	Pop %	Count	Trend	Pop %
2021	1,700	1,480	▼6.6%	87.1%	145	▲20.8%	8.5%	40	▲60.0%	2.4%	30	▼40.0%	1.8%
2016	1,780	1,585	0.0%	89.0%	120	▲20.0%	6.7%	25	▼16.7%	1.4%	50	▲150.0%	2.8%
2011	1,735	1,585	▲0.3%	91.4%	100	▼16.7%	5.8%	30	▲20.0%	1.7%	20	▲ n/a%	1.2%
2006	1,725	1,580	▲6.4%	91.6%	120	▲33.3%	7.0%	25	▲ n/a%	1.5%	0	▼100.0%	0.0%
2001	1,590	1,485	▼0.3%	93.4%	90	▲157.1%	5.7%	0	0.0%	0.0%	15	▲ n/a%	0.9%
1996	1,525	1,490	n/a	97.7%	35	n/a	2.3%	0	n/a	0.0%	0	n/a	0.0%

== Government ==
List of former mayors (since formation of current municipality):

- Joseph Ferdinand Charles Edouard Leduc (1974–1977)
- Joseph Paul Arthur André Leroux (1977–1994)
- Joseph Théophile Gaétan Pilon (1994–1995)
- Joseph-Aldema-Guy-Gilles Farand (1995–2013)
- Nicole Loiselle (2013)
- Daniel Beaupré (2013–2021)
- Mylène Labre (2021–present)

== Education ==
Commission Scolaire des Trois-Lacs operates Francophone schools.

- École Cuillierrier

Lester B. Pearson School Board operates Anglophone schools.

- Evergreen Elementary and Forest Hill Elementary (Junior Campus and Senior campus) in Saint-Lazare or Soulanges Elementary School in Saint-Télesphore
- Westwood Junior High School in Saint-Lazare and Westwood Senior High School in Hudson.

== See also ==
- List of anglophone communities in Quebec
- List of municipalities in Quebec
