= CJVD-FM =

Radio station in Vaudreuil-Dorion, Quebec

Coordinates: 45°24′55″N 74°02′45″W

CKVD-FM
- Vaudreuil-Dorion, Quebec; Canada
- Frequency: 100.1 MHz

Programming
- Format: Adult Hits

Ownership
- Owner: Yves Sauvé

History
- First air date: September 29, 2008
- Former call signs: CJVD-FM (2008-2023)
- Call sign meaning: Vaudreuil-Dorion

Technical information
- Class: A
- ERP: vertical polarization only: 550 watts average 1 kW peak
- HAAT: 52.5 meters (172 ft)

Links
- Website: ckvd1001fm.com/

CKVD-FM is a French-language Canadian radio station located in Vaudreuil-Dorion, Quebec.

Owned and operated by Yves Sauvé, it broadcasts on 100.1 MHz using a directional antenna with an average effective radiated power of 550 watts and 1,000 watts Peak. (class A). The station has an adult hits format, including music from 1970s to the 2000s and identifies itself as CKVD 100,1 Flashback FM. CKVD-FM serves Vaudreuil-Soulanges, the West Island communities of Montreal, Valleyfield, Beauharnois and Chateauguay.

The radio station was founded on September 29, 2008, by Sauvé with the collaboration of Richard Noël, two well-known broadcasters in Quebec. These professionals worked during many years for important radio stations before the foundation of CJVD-FM.

The station was given approval by the CRTC on July 6, 2007. However, as Sauvé had requested the 106.3 frequency, which was instead granted to Canadian Hellenic Cable Radio (CHCR) for a multicultural station (which became CKIN-FM), Sauvé's approval was made conditional on submitting a new application to use another frequency. His application for 100.1 MHz was granted on May 2, 2008.

In February 2023, the CRTC approved the sale of the station to Le5 Communications, a Franco-Ontarian company. On March 1, 2023, the new owner changed the call sign to CKVD-FM, with the slogan: "My sound, my region". Paul Lefebvre, the owner of the station is the mayor of the city of Greater Sudbury in Ontario.

== Former logos ==
CJVD 100,1 logo 2012 - 2023
