= L'Île-Perrot =

- City
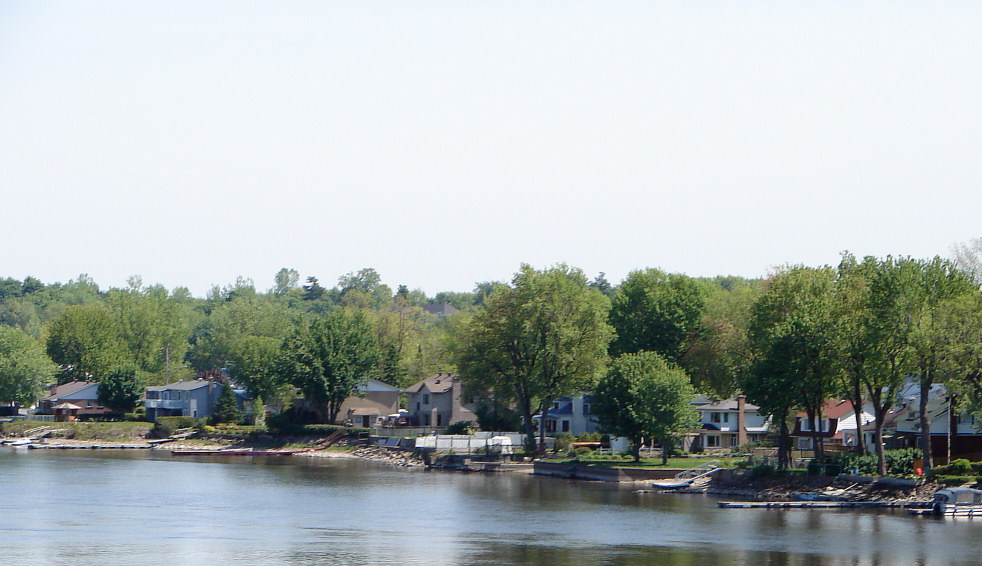

- Seal

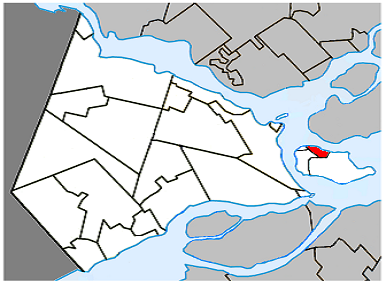
- Location within Vaudreuil-Soulanges RCM

- Location in southern Quebec
- Coordinates: 45°23′36″N 73°57′18″W
- Country: Canada
- Province: Quebec
- Region: Montérégie
- RCM: Vaudreuil-Soulanges
- Constituted: July 1, 1855

Government
  - Mayor: Marc Deslauriers
  - Federal riding: Vaudreuil
  - Prov. riding: Vaudreuil

Area
  - Total: 5.50 km^{2} (2.12 sq mi)
  - Land: 5.55 km^{2} (2.14 sq mi)
- There is an apparent contradiction between two authoritative sources.

Population (2016)
  - Total: 10,756
  - Density: 1,938.4/km^{2} (5,020/sq mi)
  - Pop 2011-2016: ▲2.4%
  - Dwellings: 4,831
- Time zone: UTC−05:00 (EST)
  - Summer (DST): UTC−04:00 (EDT)
- Postal code(s): J7V
- Area codes: 514 and 438
- Highways: A-20
- Website: www.ile-perrot.qc.ca

The Town of Île-Perrot (French/official name: Ville de l'Île-Perrot, pronounced [lil pɛʁo]) is a town and municipality on Île Perrot in southwestern Quebec, Canada. The population as of the Canada 2016 Census was 10,756. The town is at the western end of Lake Saint-Louis, and borders the local island communities of Terrasse-Vaudreuil, Pincourt and Notre-Dame-de-l'Île-Perrot. It also includes Dowker Island and the small Claude and Bellevue Islands (Île Claude and Île Bellevue).

== History ==
The island was granted on October 29, 1672, to François-Marie Perrot (1644-1691), captain in the Picardy Regiment and governor of Montreal in 1670. In 1786, the place received its first parish priest.

In 1845, the Municipality of l'Isle-Perrot was founded, abolished in 1847, and re-established in 1855 as the Parish Municipality of Sainte-Jeanne-Chantal-de-l'Isle-Perrot (partially taking the name of the Sainte-Jeanne-Chantal Parish established there in 1832). In 1946, its name was changed to L'Île-Perrot, and in 1955, it changed statutes from parish municipality to ville.

In 1949, L'Île-Perrot greatly reduced in size when a large part of its territory was split off to form the new Parish Municipality of Notre-Dame-de-l'Île-Perrot.

== Demographics ==
Historical census populations – L'Île-Perrot, Quebec
Year	Pop.	±%
1976	5,272	—
1981	5,945	+12.8%
1986	6,586	+10.8%
1991	8,064	+22.4%
1996	9,178	+13.8%
2001	9,375	+2.1%
2006	9,927	+5.9%
2011	10,503	+5.8%
2016	10,756	+2.4%
Source: Statistics Canada

In the 2021 Census of Population conducted by Statistics Canada, L'Île-Perrot had a population of 11,638 living in 4,997 of its 5,150 total private dwellings, a change of 8.2% from its 2016 population of 10,756. With a land area of 5.46 km^{2} (2.11 sq mi), it had a population density of 2,131.5/km^{2} (5,520.6/sq mi) in 2021.

Canada census – L'Île-Perrot community profile

	2021	2016	2011
Population	11,638 (+8.2% from 2016)	10,756 (2.4% from 2011)	10,503 (+5.8% from 2006)
Land area	5.46 km^{2} (2.11 sq mi)	5.55 km^{2} (2.14 sq mi)	5.56 km^{2} (2.15 sq mi)
Population density	2,130.1/km^{2} (5,517/sq mi)	1,938.4/km^{2} (5,020/sq mi)	1,889.8/km^{2} (4,895/sq mi)
Median age	44.4 (M: 43.2, F: 45.2)	41.7 (M: 40.8, F: 42.5)	40.6 (M: 39.5, F: 41.7)
Private dwellings	5,150 (total) 4,997 (occupied)	4,831 (total)	4,701 (total)
Median household income	$75,500	$62,771	$55,233

References: 2021 2016 2011

Canada Census Mother Tongue - L'Île-Perrot, Quebec
Census	Total	French			English			French & English			Other		
Year	Responses	Count	Trend	Pop %	Count	Trend	Pop %	Count	Trend	Pop %	Count	Trend	Pop %
2011	10,315	6,840	▼7.1%	66.31%	2,140	▲31.3%	20.75%	185	▲85.0%	1.79%	1,150	▲57.5%	11.15%
2006	9,825	7,365	▲0.8%	74.96%	1,630	▲14.0%	16.59%	100	▼9.1%	1.02%	730	▲73.8%	7.43%
2001	9,265	7,305	▲0.1%	78.85%	1,430	▲8.3%	15.43%	110	▲15.8%	1.19%	420	▲33.3%	4.53%
1996	9,025	7,295	n/a	80.83%	1,320	n/a	14.63%	95	n/a	1.05%	315	n/a	3.49%

== Local government ==
List of former mayors:

- Ludger Stocker (1955)
- Florian Bleau (1955–1973)
- Marcel Rainville (1973–1977)
- René Émard (1977–1981)
- Pierre Bleau (1981–1989)
- Michel Martin (1989–1990)
- Claude Girouard (1990–1993)
- François Grégoire (1993–1997)
- Marc Roy (1997–2017)
- Pierre Séguin (2017–present)

== Transportation ==
Autoroute 20 runs through the town, with three at-grade intersections serving as exits. The east side of L'Île-Perrot is bordered by a branch of the Ottawa River with a crossing via Autoroute 20 over the Galipeault Bridge (Pont Galipeault) to Sainte-Anne-de-Bellevue on Montreal Island.

There is a shuttle bus service operated by CIT La Presqu'Île connecting to the Île-Perrot station on the Vaudreuil-Hudson commuter rail line.

== Education ==
There are 3 francophone elementary schools (Virginie Roy, François-Perrot and La Perdriolle) and an adult education centre in L'Île-Perrot, all run by the Commission Scolaire des Trois-Lacs.

Lester B. Pearson School Board operates Anglophone schools. The community is zoned to Dorset Elementary School in Baie-d'Urfé.

== See also ==
- List of anglophone communities in Quebec
- List of cities in Quebec
