= École secondaire de la Cité-des-Jeunes =

Coordinates: 45.3945°N 74.0282°W

École secondaire de la Cité-des-Jeunes, previously named École secondaire Vaudreuil, is a public high school in Vaudreuil-Dorion, Quebec, Canada. Managed by the Commission scolaire des Trois-Lacs, it serves the northern population of the peninsula of the regional county municipality of Vaudreuil-Soulanges.

== History ==
The school was founded during the Quiet Revolution of Quebec by the deputy of Vaudreuil-Soulanges and Minister of Education Paul Gérin-Lajoie with creating a place where everything would be accessible for students in mind. In fact, not just a school but a whole campus that was built: a high school, a trade school, a building for adults continuing education, a pool and an arena. The school is the birthplace of the education reform and one of the first polyvalantes created in Quebec.

The campus is still the largest in the province in terms of land. Previously known as École secondaire Vaudreuil and then École secondaire de la Cité-des-Jeunes, the school picked its current name in 2004. An English school (Vaudreuil High School) used to be in the current Paul-Gérin-Lajoie buildings. It is now used for adults in continuing education.

Previously, Pavilion Vaudreuil (the northernmost building on campus) was divided into two sections: one for boys, Salle G (garçons, or boys) and Salle F (filles, or girls) which were used in between classes. There was previously a baseball field, but it was destroyed to build Brind'Amour, which, unlike the rest of the campus, is a primary education establishment. The football field was the closest thing to a replacement for the baseball field.

In 2019, the high school witnessed minor flooding throughout the months of April and May.

== Campus ==
Buildings:

- École secondaire de la Cité-des-Jeunes
  - Vaudreuil Pavilion (1st, 2nd, 4th and 5th years of high school)
  - Lionel-Groulx Pavilion (3rd year of high school and EHDAA)
- Cultural Center
  - Library
  - Cafeterias
  - Theaters
  - Infirmary
  - Belles Rives Center
  - Music classes
  - etc.
- Sports Center
- Paul Gérin-Lajoie Training Center
- Brind'Amour
- Pool (also used for Cita-Dins de Vaudreuil swim team)
- Water Treatment School

Institutions:

- Commission Scolaire des Trois-Lacs Administrative Center
- École secondaire de la Cité-des-Jeunes
- Trois-Lacs Multicenter
  - Paul Gérin-Lajoie Training Center
  - Belles Rives Center (General Education to Adults)
  - The Administrative Office of Services to Enterprises
- Municipal Pool
- Municipal Arena

== Statistics ==
As of 2018, École secondaire de la Cité-des-Jeunes teaches 2874 students and Brind'amour teaches 517, for a total of 3391 students on the campus based on available data.

== Sports ==
The school sport teams have Citadins de la Cité-des-Jeunes as a name. Their most popular sports are football, volleyball, and badminton. The ice hockey and swimming teams also use a public arena and indoor swimming pool which are located on the school’s campus.

== See also ==
=== External links ===
- École secondaire de la Cité-des-Jeunes (School website. French only.)
- Commission Scolaire des Trois-Lacs (School board website. French only.)
- The Cité-des-Jeunes Foundation (French only.)

=== Related articles ===
- Commission Scolaire des Trois-Lacs (French/English)
- Collège Bourget (French/English)

(English versions for both of these are incomplete.)
