= Notre-Dame-de-l'Île-Perrot =

- City
- Ville de Notre-Dame-de-l'Île-Perrot
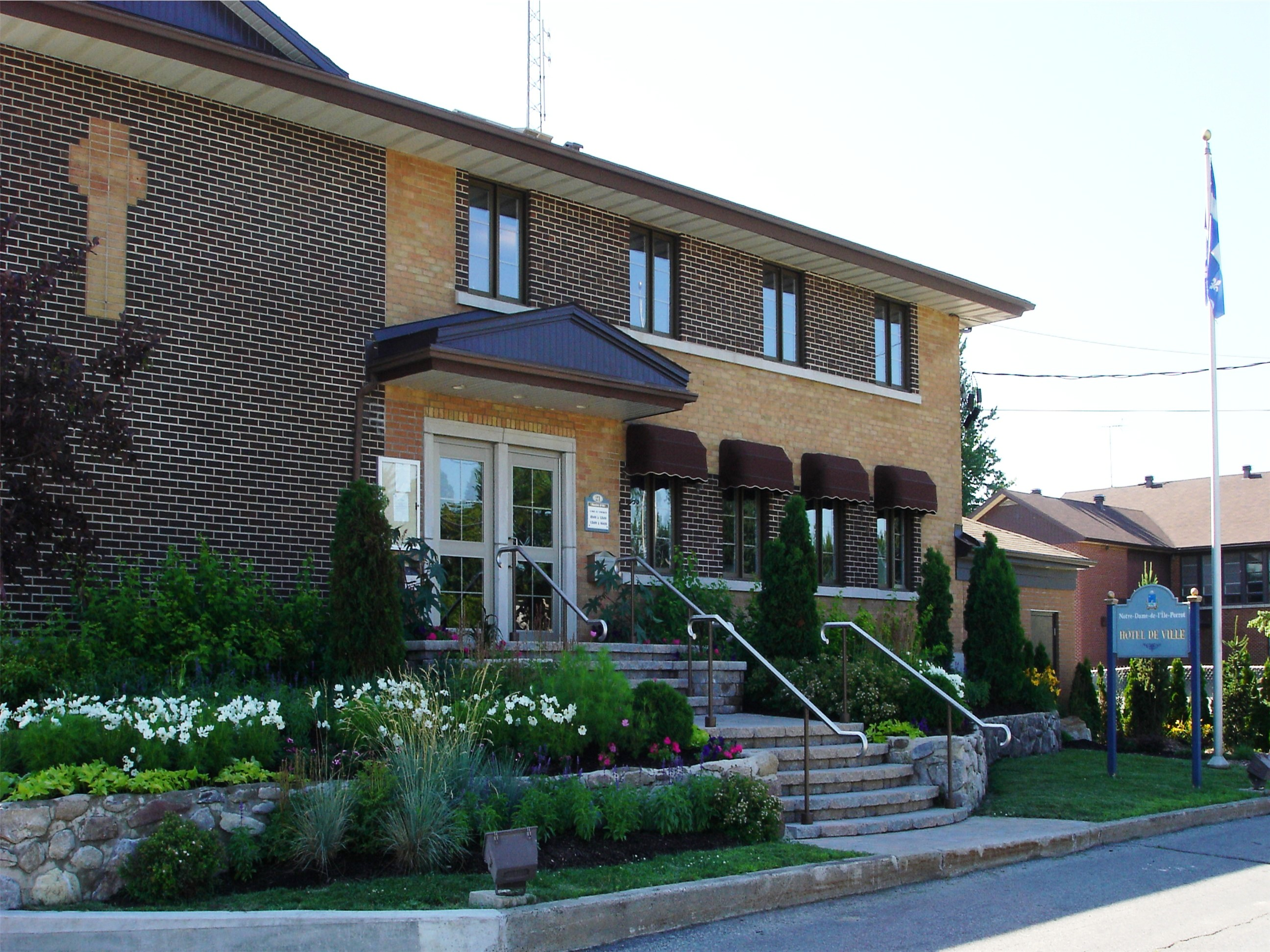
- Town hall

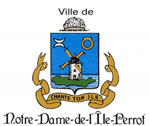
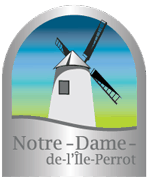
- Coat of arms

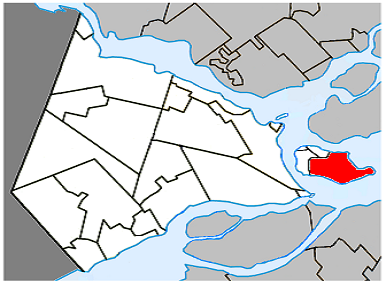
- Location within Vaudreuil-Soulanges RCM

- Location in southern Quebec
- Coordinates: 45°22′N 73°56′W
- Country: Canada
- Province: Quebec
- Region: Montérégie
- RCM: Vaudreuil-Soulanges
- Constituted: 14 April 1984

Government
  - Mayor: Danie Deschênes
  - Federal riding: Vaudreuil
  - Prov. riding: Vaudreuil

Area
  - Total: 65.60 km^{2} (25.33 sq mi)
  - Land: 28.06 km^{2} (10.83 sq mi)

Population (2021)
  - Total: 11,427
  - Density: 407.3/km^{2} (1,055/sq mi)
  - Pop 2016-2021: ▲7.3%
  - Dwellings: 4,156
- Time zone: UTC−5 (EST)
  - Summer (DST): UTC−4 (EDT)
- Postal code(s): J7V
- Area codes: 514 and 438
- Highways: No major routes
- Website: www.ndip.org

Notre-Dame-de-l'Île-Perrot (French pronunciation: [nɔtʁə dam də lil pɛʁo]) is the largest of four municipalities located on Île Perrot, west of the island of Montreal, Quebec. The population as of the Canada 2016 Census was 10,654. It hosts the island's first church built in 1740 originally situated at Pointe-du-Moulin which was reconstituted as the Chapelle du Souvenir in 1953 beside the church of Sainte-Jeanne-de-Chantal across from the town hall.

== History ==
The island was granted as a seigneury on 29 October 1672, to François-Marie Perrot (1644–1691), captain in the Picardy Regiment and governor of Montreal in 1670.

In 1949, the Parish Municipality of Notre-Dame-de-l'Île-Perrot was formed out of the Parish Municipality of L'Île-Perrot. A year later, it lost part of its territory when the Village Municipality of Pincourt was created.

On 18 December 1986, the Town of Pointe-du-Moulin (founded in 1958) was amalgamated into Notre-Dame-de-l'Île-Perrot, which changed statutes from parish municipality to (regular) municipality in 1998, and became a ville in 2004.

== Demographics ==
Historical census populations – Notre-Dame-de-l'Île-Perrot
Year	Pop.	±%
1951	484	—
1956	794	+64.0%
1961	1,069	+34.6%
1966	1,280	+19.7%
1971	1,552	+21.2%
1976	2,400	+54.6%
1981	2,979	+24.1%
1986	4,325	+45.2%
1991	5,372	+24.2%
1996	7,059	+31.4%
2001	8,546	+21.1%
2006	9,885	+15.7%
2011	10,620	+7.4%
2016	10,654	+0.3%
2021	11,427	+7.3%
Source: Statistics Canada

In the 2021 Census of Population conducted by Statistics Canada, Notre-Dame-de-l'Île-Perrot had a population of 11,427 living in 4,070 of its 4,156 total private dwellings, a change of 7.3% from its 2016 population of 10,654. With a land area of 28.06 km^{2} (10.83 sq mi), it had a population density of 407.2/km^{2} (1,054.7/sq mi) in 2021.

Canada census – Notre-Dame-de-l'Île-Perrot community profile

	2021	2016	2011
Population	11,427 (+7.3% from 2016)	10,654 (0.3% from 2011)	10,620 (+7.4% from 2006)
Land area	28.06 km^{2} (10.83 sq mi)	28.21 km^{2} (10.89 sq mi)	27.80 km^{2} (10.73 sq mi)
Population density	407.3/km^{2} (1,055/sq mi)	377.6/km^{2} (978/sq mi)	382.1/km^{2} (990/sq mi)
Median age	43.6 (M: 43.2, F: 44)	42.3 (M: 42.7, F: 42.1)	39.6 (M: 39.7, F: 39.6)
Private dwellings	4,070 (total)	3,843 (total)	3,768 (total)
Median household income	$120,000	$104,192	$92,539

References: 2021 2016 2011

Canada Census Mother Tongue - Notre-Dame-de-l'Île-Perrot, Quebec
Census	Total	French			English			French & English			Other		
Year	Responses	Count	Trend	Pop %	Count	Trend	Pop %	Count	Trend	Pop %	Count	Trend	Pop %
2021	11,420	6,320	▼3.8%	55.3%	2,555	▲10.6%	22.4%	375	▲78.6%	3.3%	1,860	▲34.8%	16.3%
2016	10,640	6,570	▼4.6%	61.8%	2,310	▲3.5%	21.7%	210	▼10.6%	2.0%	1,380	▲25.5%	13.0%
2011	10,455	6,890	▼2.1%	65.9%	2,230	▲12.6%	21.3%	235	▲56.7%	2.3%	1,100	▲57.1%	10.5%
2006	9,865	7,035	▲10.4%	71.3%	1,980	▲29.8%	20.1%	150	▲20.0%	1.5%	700	▲38.6%	7.1%
2001	8,530	6,375	▲18.6%	74.7%	1,525	▲22.5%	17.9%	125	▲19.0%	1.5%	505	▲71.2%	5.9%
1996	7,020	5,375	n/a	76.6%	1,245	n/a	17.7%	105	n/a	1.5%	295	n/a	4.2%

== Government ==
List of former mayors:

- Michel Tarte (2001–2005)
- Serge Roy (2005–2009)
- Marie-Claude Nichols (2009–2014)
- Danie Deschênes (2014–present)

== Infrastructure ==
There is a shuttle bus service operated by CIT La Presqu'Île connecting to the Vaudreuil-Hudson commuter rail line.

== Education ==
Commission Scolaire des Trois-Lacs operates Francophone schools.

- École de la Samare
- École Notre-Dame-de-la-Garde
- Some areas are zoned to École La Perdriolle in L'Île-Perrot

Lester B. Pearson School Board operates Anglophone schools. A part of the community is zoned to Dorset Elementary School in Baie-d'Urfé and another is zoned to Edgewater Elementary School and St. Patrick Elementary School in Pincourt.

== See also ==
- List of anglophone communities in Quebec
- List of cities in Quebec
