= Saint-Lazare, Quebec =

Saint-Lazare
- City
- Ville de Saint-Lazare
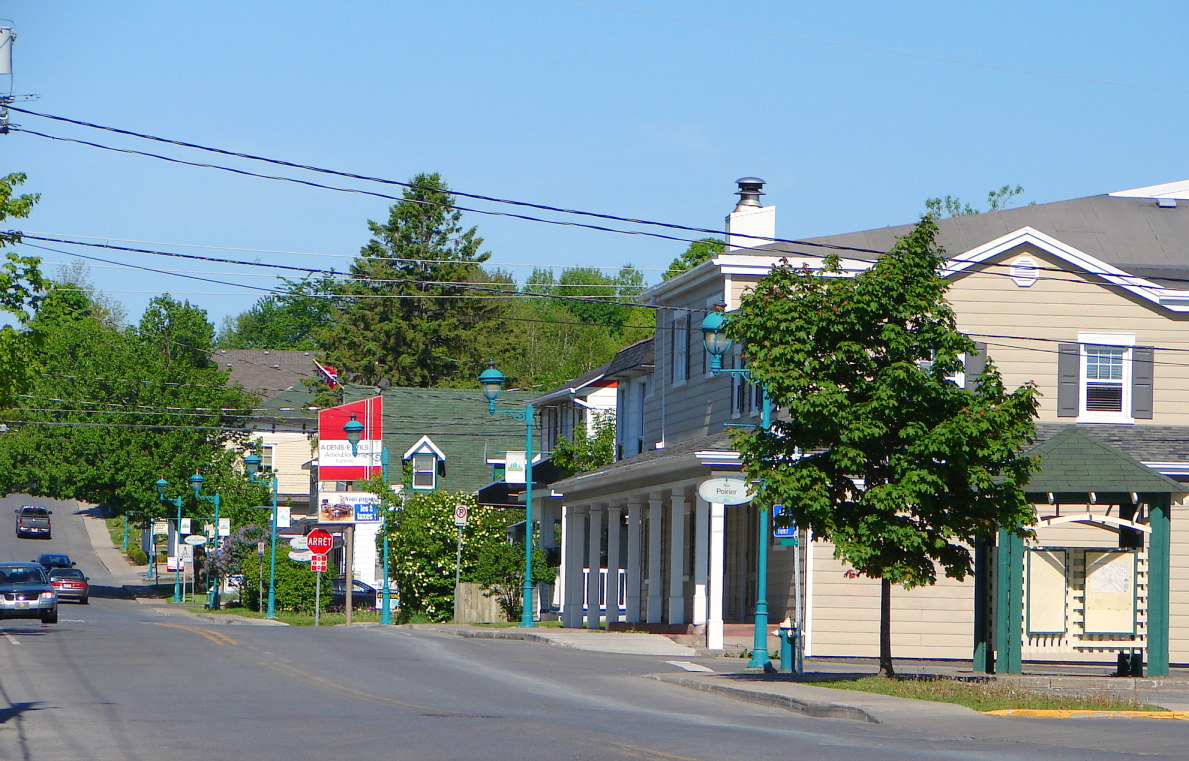
- St-Angélique Road

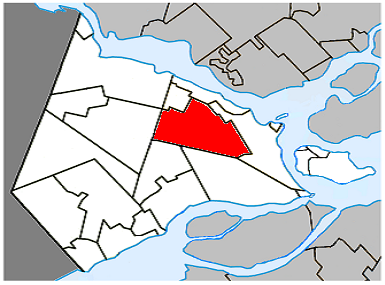
- Location within Vaudreuil-Soulanges RCM

- Location in southern Quebec
- Coordinates: 45°24′N 74°08′W
- Country: Canada
- Province: Quebec
- Region: Montérégie
- RCM: Vaudreuil-Soulanges
- Constituted: 31 December 1875

Government
  - Mayor: Genevieve Lachance
  - Federal riding: Vaudreuil
  - Prov. riding: Soulanges

Area
  - City: 67.5 km^{2} (26.1 sq mi)
  - Land: 66.86 km^{2} (25.81 sq mi)
  - Urban: 34.67 km^{2} (13.39 sq mi)

Population (2021)
  - City: 22,354
  - Density: 334.3/km^{2} (866/sq mi)
  - Urban: 24,245
  - Urban density: 699.3/km^{2} (1,811/sq mi)
  - Pop 2016-2021: ▲12.2%
  - Dwellings: 7,848
- Time zone: UTC−5 (EST)
  - Summer (DST): UTC−4 (EDT)
- Postal code(s): J7T
- Area codes: 450 and 579
- Highways A-40 (TCH): R-340; R-342
- Website: ville.saint-lazare.qc.ca

Saint-Lazare (French pronunciation: [sɛ̃ lazaʁ]) is an off-island suburb of Montreal, in southwestern Quebec, Canada in the Regional County Municipality of Vaudreuil-Soulanges.

== History ==
Originally part of the Seigneurie de Vaudreuil in the 18th century, the territory corresponding to Saint-Lazare was considered difficult to farm owing to sandy soil, and remained mostly uninhabited. In 1812, the first settlers were Americans from New England. Circa 1820, English from Cumberland settled the area, who were followed soon after by French Canadians.

Saint-Lazare was founded as a parish municipality on 29 December 1875. The first church was built in 1877, destroyed by a fire in 1942 and subsequently rebuilt in 1947.

A passenger train from Canadian Pacific Railway previously ran through the town but was discontinued in 1960. The station located on the corner of Sainte-Angélique and Duhamel was demolished.

Originally a rural farming town, the city of Saint-Lazare experienced rapid growth in the 1990s, fueled predominantly by the arrival of young, middle-class families. New residents flocked to the area seeking a more relaxed lifestyle than that of the island of Montreal, as well as larger homes and property for less money than on the island of Montreal.

In December 2001, Saint-Lazare changed its statutes and became a city.

In 2015, the Saint-Lazare government began using pictograms instead of text on signs when the Office québécois de la langue française (OQLF) asked it to remove its English-language signs; the Saint-Lazare community believes in accommodating bilingualism and its Anglophone residents.

In April 2023, there was a massive power outage that cause approximately 8000 households to lose electricity, according to Hydro-Quebec at that time. Only eight households had electricity at the height of the ice-storm crisis.

== Geography ==
=== Communities ===
- Saint-Lazare-de-Vaudreuil
- Saint-Lazare-Sud
- Saint-Lazare-Nord
- Saddlebrook
- Sandcastle
- Cedarbrook
- Sunnybrook
- Chanterel
- Forest Hill
- Maple Ridge

=== Soils ===
Saint-Lazare was built on thick deposits of sand. Poorly drained areas are most common in the eastern part of town and have been mapped as muck, Peat or Vaudreuil series (a "half-bog" or gleysol), while the well to rapidly drained classic podzols are assigned to Ste. Sophie or Upland series.

== Demographics ==
Historical Census Data - Saint-Lazare, Quebec

Year	Pop.	±%
1881	1,190	—
1891	1,325	+11.3%
1901	1,411	+6.5%
1911	1,351	−4.3%
1921	1,267	−6.2%
1931	1,340	+5.8%
1941	1,268	−5.4%
1951	1,351	+6.5%
1956	1,550	+14.7%
1961	1,678	+8.3%
1966	1,959	+16.7%

Year	Pop.	±%
1971	2,146	+9.5%
1976	3,005	+40.0%
1981	4,219	+40.4%
1986	5,064	+20.0%
1991	9,057	+78.9%
1996	11,193	+23.6%
2001	12,895	+15.2%
2006	17,016	+32.0%
2011	19,295	+13.4%
2016	19,917	+3.2%
2021	22,354	+12.2%

Source: Statistics Canada

In the 2021 Census of Population conducted by Statistics Canada, Saint-Lazare had a population of 22,354 living in 7,749 of its 7,848 total private dwellings, a change of 12.2% from its 2016 population of 19,917. With a land area of 66.86 km^{2} (25.81 sq mi), it had a population density of 334.3/km^{2} (865.9/sq mi) in 2021.

Canada census – Saint-Lazare community profile

	2021	2016	2011
Population	22,354 (+12.2% from 2016)	19,917 (+3.2% from 2011)	19,295 (+13.4% from 2006)
Land area	66.86 km^{2} (25.81 sq mi)	66.80 km^{2} (25.79 sq mi)	66.62 km^{2} (25.72 sq mi)
Population density	334.3/km^{2} (866/sq mi)	297.8/km^{2} (771/sq mi)	289.6/km^{2} (750/sq mi)
Median age	40.8 (M: 40.4, F: 41.2)	40.9 (M: 41.0, F: 40.9)	38.4 (M: 38.7, F: 38.2)
Private dwellings	7,848 (total) 7,749 (occupied)	6,834 (total)	6,546 (total)
Median household income	$123,000	$116,736	$97,138

References: 2021 2016 2011

Canada Census Mother Tongue - Saint-Lazare, Quebec
Census	Total	French			English			French & English			Other		
Year	Responses	Count	Trend	Pop %	Count	Trend	Pop %	Count	Trend	Pop %	Count	Trend	Pop %
2021	22,355	10,485	▲0.3%	46.9%	8,195	▲14.2%	36.7%	815	▲68.0%	3.6%	2,490	▲54.2%	11.1%
2016	19,890	10,450	▲1.6%	52.6%	7,175	▲1.8%	36.1%	485	▲10.3%	2.4%	1,615	▲14.5%	8.1%
2011	19,185	10,290	▲11.5%	53.6%	7,045	▲3.12%	36.7%	440	▲76.0%	2.3%	1,410	▲2.9%	7.4%
2006	17,015	9,230	▲30.8%	54.3%	6,165	▲29.8%	36.2%	250	▼5.7%	1.5%	1,370	▲65.1%	8.1%
2001	12,900	7,055	▲14.5%	54.7%	4,750	▲18.9%	36.8%	265	▲15.2%	2.1%	830	▲12.9%	6.4%
1996	11,120	6,160	n/a	55.4%	3,995	n/a	35.9%	230	n/a	2.1%	735	n/a	6.6%

== Attractions ==
Some of the popular attractions are:

- Aéroport Cooper
- Bar Chez Maurice
- Bar Planète St-Lazare
- Club équestre Les Forestiers
- Sports Complex
- Festivals
- Festival équestre Gymkhana
- Horse shows
- La Pinière
- Torchlight Parade (ATV)
- Trails and paths
- Canins canine sport center

=== Parks ===
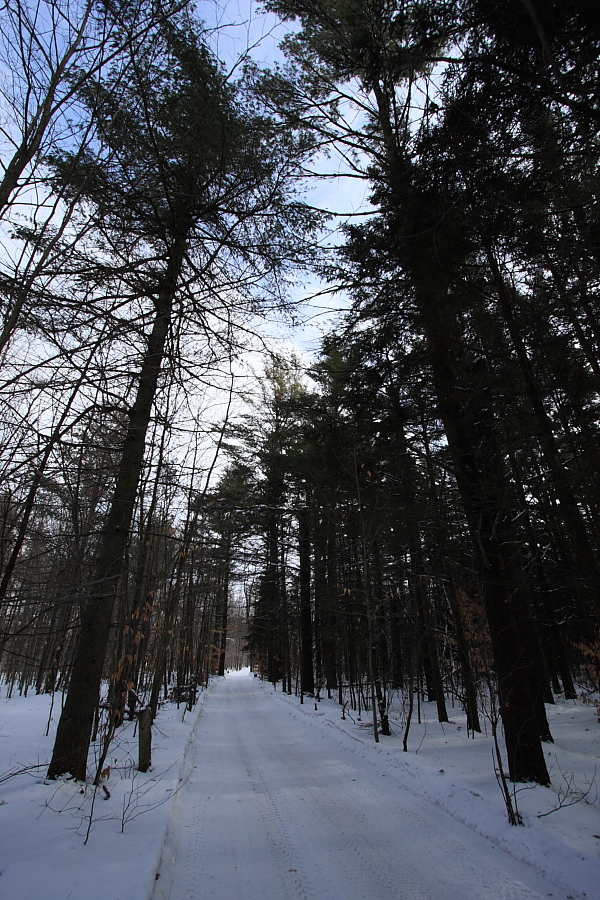
ATV trail passing, criss-crossing with equestrian horse trails through the western portion of Saint-Lazare, Quebec.

Saint-Lazare is graced by significant public funding for its ambitious recreational projects. Bedard Park in the centre of the town is a relatively large park equipped with a small water park, a grass field, three baseball diamonds, and tennis courts. In the winter two hockey rinks and an ice skating oval are added. Another large, multi-use park is called Le Parc nature les Forestiers de Saint-Lazare (2800 Chemin Lotbinière, Saint-Lazare, QC J7T 3H9). It is a 4-season park, with an outdoor pool, trails for hiking, cross-country skiing, horse riding, and snowshoeing, and picnic areas.

Other parks in Saint-Lazare are scattered among the small subdivisions throughout the municipality.

A new privately-financed sports centre was opened to the public in 2006 which includes an indoor soccer turf, a hockey rink, and a gym.

=== Equestrian ===
Areas surrounding Saint-Lazare are dedicated to equestrian horse riding, including sanctioned trails that flow through wooded forests and nearby lakes in the region. Many trails are sand based, which is due in part to the popularity of this type of activity in the region. The town has one of the largest populations of horses, approximately 3,500 with many residential properties fully dedicated to breeding and horse training.

=== ATV ===
All-terrain vehicles are very popular in the region with an officially sanctioned trail, which runs between Saint-Lazare and the nearby town of Rigaud, Quebec. The trail is maintained by regional members of local ATV clubs. The trails are open in all four seasons, and groomed in the winter using heavy machinery.

== Infrastructure ==
The city is served by the 51 bus from the Exo La Presqu’Île, terminating at the Vaudreuil train station.

== Education ==
Commission Scolaire des Trois-Lacs operates Francophone schools.

- École à l'Orée-du-Bois
- École Auclair
- École des Étriers
- Sections are zoned to École Saint-Thomas in Hudson

There is one French language public high school (École secondaire Cité-des-Jeunes in Vaudreuil-Dorion) in the area.

Lester B. Pearson School Board operates Anglophone schools.

- Birchwood Elementary School
- Evergreen Elementary School
- Forest Hill Elementary School
- A portion is zoned to Mount Pleasant Elementary School in Hudson
- Westwood High School-Junior Campus (the senior campus is in Hudson)

A new senior elementary school, Forest Hill Senior, was opened in 2006. There are also two English language public secondary schools in the surrounding area (Westwood Senior - formerly Hudson High School - and Westwood Junior-formerly known as Vaudreuil Catholic High School). A new English-language elementary school (Birchwood Elementary) has opened for the 2011–2012 school year, even after many delays in construction.

There is a semi-private French-speaking institution in Rigaud (Collège-Bourget).

== See also ==
- List of anglophone communities in Quebec
- List of cities in Quebec
