= Pincourt =

- City
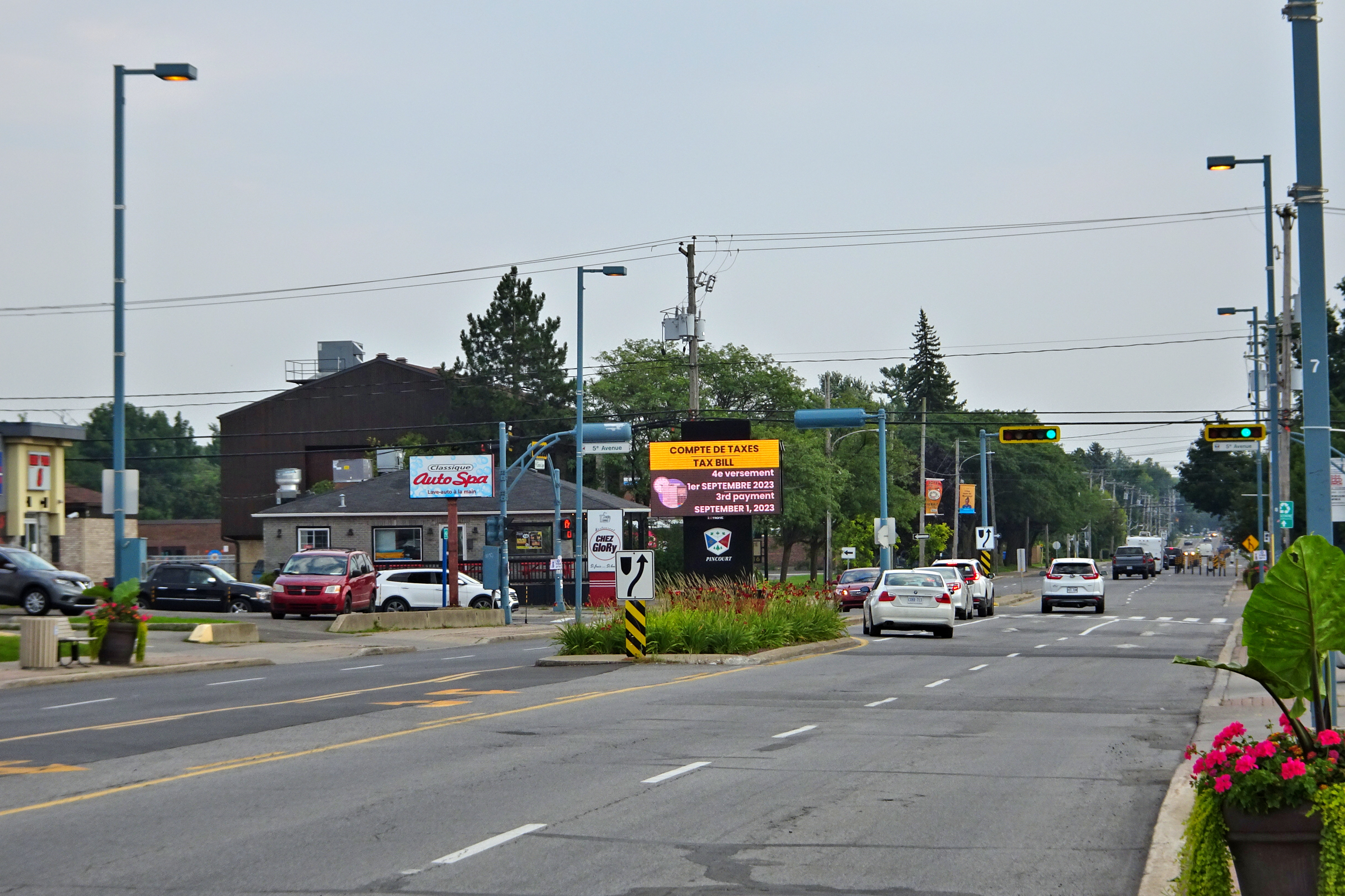
- Boulevard Cardinal Léger in Pincourt

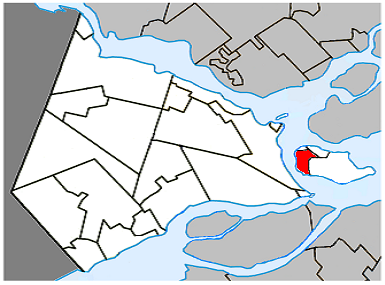
- Location within Vaudreuil-Soulanges RCM

- Location in southern Quebec
- Coordinates: 45°23′N 73°59′W
- Country: Canada
- Province: Quebec
- Region: Montérégie
- RCM: Vaudreuil-Soulanges
- Constituted: 1 January 1950

Government
  - Mayor: Claude Comeau
  - Federal riding: Vaudreuil
  - Prov. riding: Vaudreuil

Area
  - Total: 7.11 km^{2} (2.75 sq mi)
  - Land: 7.10 km^{2} (2.74 sq mi)

Population (2021)
  - Total: 14,751
  - Density: 2,078/km^{2} (5,380/sq mi)
  - Pop (2016–21): ▲1.3%
  - Dwellings: 5,786
- Time zone: UTC−5 (EST)
  - Summer (DST): UTC−4 (EDT)
- Postal code(s): J7V, J7W (until 2014), only J7W as of summer 2014
- Area codes: 514 and 438
- Highways: A-20
- Website: www.villepincourt.qc.ca

Pincourt (French pronunciation: [pɛ̃kuʁ]) is a municipality on the island of Île Perrot, off the western tip of the island of Montreal, Quebec. The population as of the 2021 Canadian census was 14,751. The town shares the island with the three other municipalities of Notre-Dame-de-l'Île-Perrot, Terrasse Vaudreuil and L'Île-Perrot, bordering on each one. The south end of the Ottawa River (Rivière des Outaouais) flows between Vaudreuil-Dorion and Pincourt, defining the town's western boundary.

Many houses, condos and townhouses are newly built as the town has undergone a building boom, which also included the opening of the new francophone Chêne-Bleu high school. The municipality also has two bilingual primary schools and one French primary school. Several parks and natural protected areas are open throughout the year for recreation.

== History ==
Settlement of the area began in 1754 when Jean-Baptiste Leduc, the island's fifth Lord from 1751 to 1785, started to grant concessions. By the end of the 18th century, there were 22 concessions and lots began to be sold along the Ottawa River to merchants and specialists, such as blacksmiths, cask makers, cobblers, weavers, and inn keepers.

In 1855, the Grand Trunk Railway was built on Ile Perrot, resulting in significant growth of the village. In 1890, a mission was established, since the parish church of Notre-Dame-de-l'Île-Perrot was considered too far away by its residents.

The Village Municipality of Pincourt was created in 1950, out of the Parish Municipality of Notre-Dame-de-l'Île-Perrot. It was named after its post office that was established in 1932. The name Pincourt, first mentioned in 1776, referred to a former forest on the western side of Ile Perrot with short pines (pins courts in French), that served as a landmark for early travelers to the area.

In 1959, Pincourt changed statutes from village municipality to ville. Since then, the town has become a residential suburb, growing rapidly in the 1960s due to several real estate developments.

== Demographics ==
Historical census populations – Pincourt

Year	Pop.	±%
1951	521	—
1956	1,437	+175.8%
1961	2,685	+86.8%
1966	5,656	+110.7%
1971	5,899	+4.3%
1976	7,892	+33.8%
1981	8,750	+10.9%
1986	9,121	+4.2%

Year	Pop.	±%
1991	9,639	+5.7%
1996	10,023	+4.0%
2001	10,107	+0.8%
2006	11,197	+10.8%
2011	14,305	+27.8%
2016	14,558	+1.8%
2021	14,751	+1.3%

Source: Statistics Canada

In the 2021 Census of Population conducted by Statistics Canada, Pincourt had a population of 14,751 living in 5,640 of its 5,786 total private dwellings, a change of 1.3% from its 2016 population of 14,558. With a land area of 7.1 km^{2} (2.7 sq mi), it had a population density of 2,077.6/km^{2} (5,381.0/sq mi) in 2021.

Canada census – Pincourt community profile

	2021	2016	2011
Population	14,751 (+1.3% from 2016)	14,558 (+1.8% from 2011)	14,305 (+27.8% from 2006)
Land area	7.10 km^{2} (2.74 sq mi)	7.11 km^{2} (2.75 sq mi)	7.54 km^{2} (2.91 sq mi)
Population density	2,078.0/km^{2} (5,382/sq mi)	2,048.1/km^{2} (5,305/sq mi)	1,896.7/km^{2} (4,912/sq mi)
Median age	42.4 (M: 41.6, F: 43.2)	40.5 (M: 39.8, F: 41.1)	38.2 (M: 37.5, F: 38.8)
Private dwellings	5,786 (total) 5,640 (occupied)	5,556 (total)	5,320 (total)
Median household income	$95,000	$81,894	$75,103

References: 2021 2016 2011

Canada Census Mother Tongue – Pincourt, Quebec
Census	Total	French			English			French & English			Other		
Year	Responses	Count	Trend	Pop %	Count	Trend	Pop %	Count	Trend	Pop %	Count	Trend	Pop %
2011	14,105	6,990	▲14.1%	49.56%	4,980	▲27.5%	35.31%	280	▲19.1%	1.98%	1,855	▲109.6%	13.15%
2006	11,150	6,125	▲1.4%	54.93%	3,905	▲13.8%	35.02%	235	▲80.8%	2.11%	885	▲90.3%	7.94%
2001	10,065	6,040	▲6.5%	60.01%	3,430	▼8.5%	34.08%	130	0.0%	1.29%	465	▲22.4%	4.62%
1996	9,930	5,670	n/a	57.10%	3,750	n/a	37.76%	130	n/a	1.31%	380	n/a	3.83%

== Local government ==
List of former mayors:

- Darie Huneault (1950–1955)
- Roland Loiselle (1955–1958)
- Valentino D'Ambrosio (1958–1967)
- Paul-Émile Martel (1967–1970)
- Jeannette Burley (1970–1974)
- Romual Sénéchal (1974–1982)
- Lorne Brown (1982–1986)
- Michel Kandyba (1986–2009)
- Yvan Cardinal (2009–2021)
- Claude Comeau (2021–present)

== Transportation ==
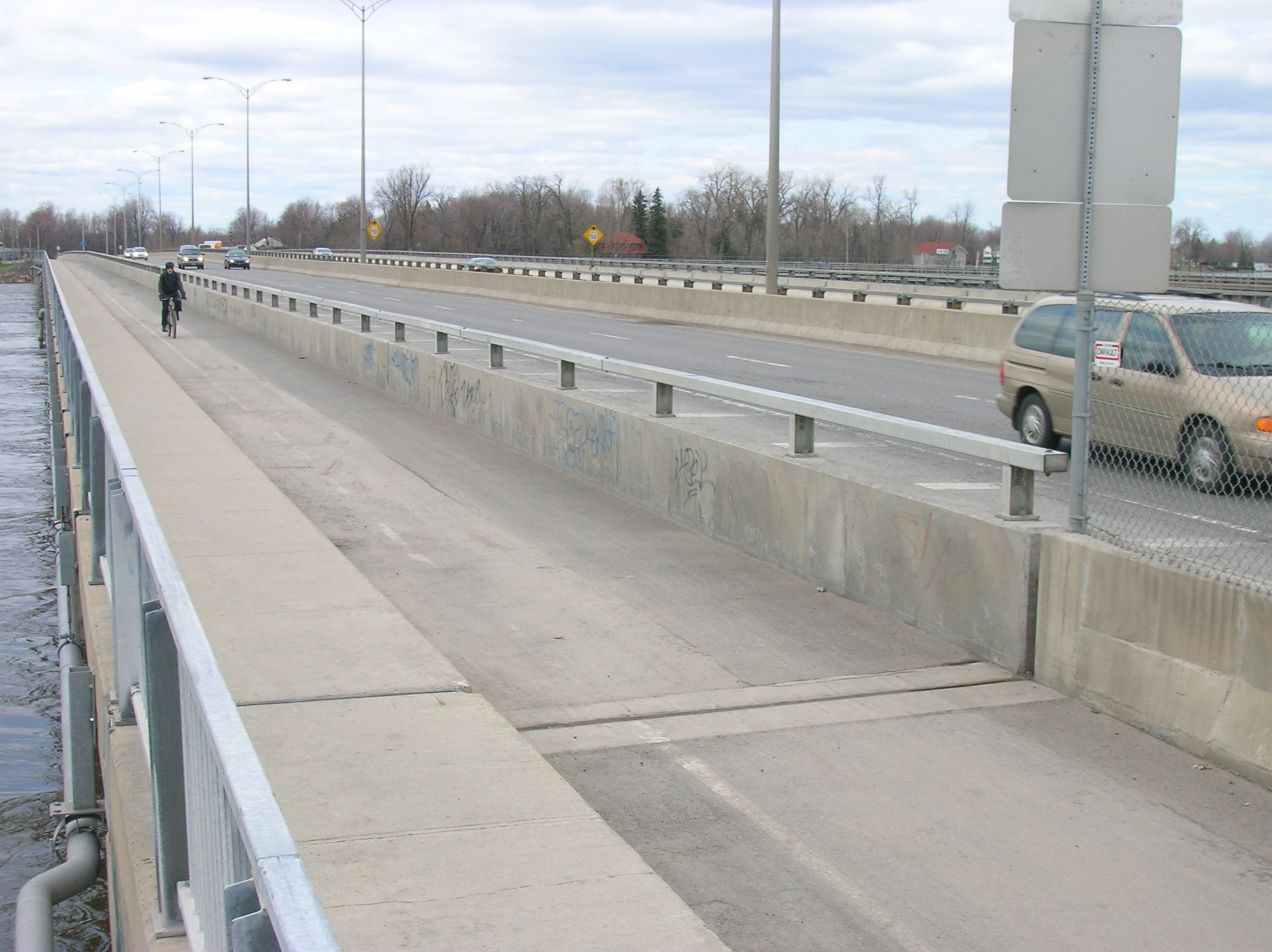
The Taschereau bridge.

Quebec Autoroute 20 runs along the north end of Pincourt and is accessible via Boulevard Cardinal Léger (exit 35), the only proper exit overpass along the section of the highway from Autoroute 30 to the island of Montréal, all others consisting of at-grade intersections with traffic lights. There is one other autoroute junction for Pincourt consisting of an at-grade intersection at Boulevard de l'Île.

On the city's western border, the Taschereau Bridge crosses the Ottawa River to Vaudreuil-Dorion.

There is a shuttle bus service that runs during rush hours operated by CIT La Presqu'Île connecting to the Pincourt–Terasse-Vaudreuil train station on the Vaudreuil-Hudson commuter train line. The CIT also offers various bus connections to Vaudreuil-Dorion, Sainte-Anne-de-Bellevue and other West-Island destinations.

== Education ==
Commission Scolaire des Trois-Lacs operates Francophone schools.

- École secondaire du Chêne-Bleu
- École Notre-Dame-de-Lorette
- Some areas are zoned to École Virginie-Roy in L'Île-Perrot

Lester B. Pearson School Board operates Anglophone schools. It is zoned to Edgewater Elementary School and St. Patrick Elementary School.

== See also ==
- List of anglophone communities in Quebec
- List of towns in Quebec
