= Vaudreuil-Dorion =

- City
- Ville de Vaudreuil-Dorion
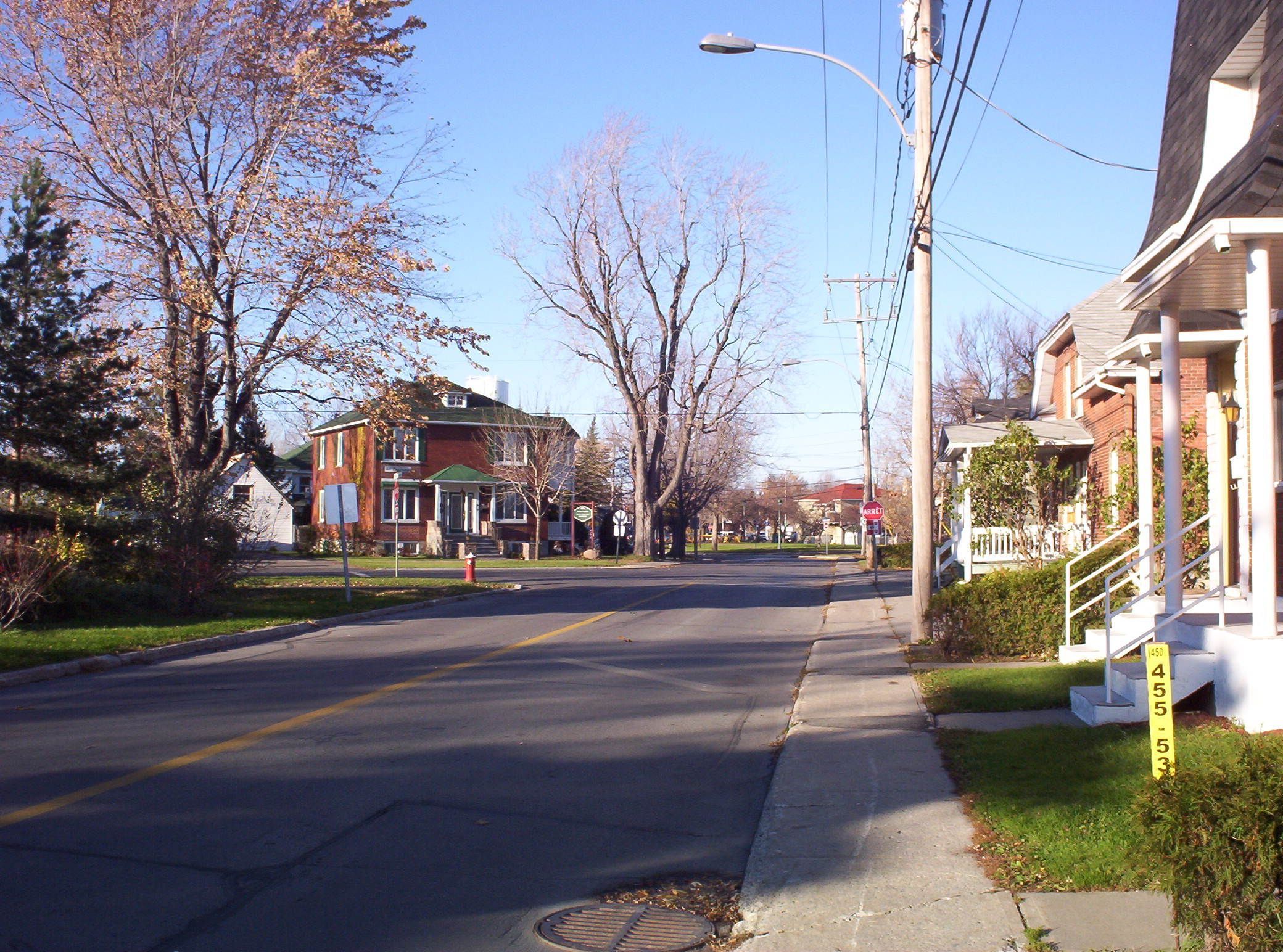
- Avenue Saint-Jean-Baptiste in Dorion

- Coat of arms

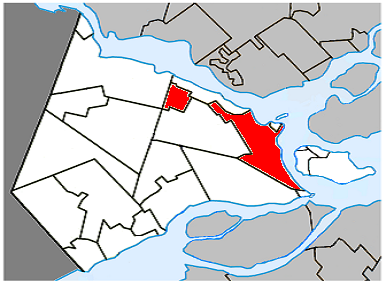
- Location within Vaudreuil-Soulanges RCM

- Location in southern Quebec
- Coordinates: 45°24′N 74°02′W
- Country: Canada
- Province: Quebec
- Region: Montérégie
- RCM: Vaudreuil-Soulanges
- Constituted: 16 March 1994

Government
  - Mayor: Paul Dumoulin
  - Federal riding: Vaudreuil
  - Prov. riding: Vaudreuil

Area
  - Total: 92.56 km^{2} (35.74 sq mi)
  - Land: 72.65 km^{2} (28.05 sq mi)

Population (2021)
  - Total: 43,268
  - Density: 595.5/km^{2} (1,542/sq mi)
  - Pop 2016-2021: ▲13.5%
  - Dwellings: 17,260
- Time zone: UTC−5 (EST)
  - Summer (DST): UTC−4 (EDT)
- Postal code(s): J7T to J7V
- Area codes: 450, 579 and 354
- Highways A-20 A-30 A-40 (TCH): R-338; R-340; R-342
- Website: www.ville.vaudreuil-dorion.qc.ca

Vaudreuil-Dorion (French pronunciation: [vodʁœj dɔʁjɔ̃]) is a suburb of Greater Montreal, in the Montérégie region of southwestern Quebec, Canada. The result of the merger of two towns, Vaudreuil and Dorion, it is located in the Vaudreuil-Soulanges Regional County Municipality.

== History ==
On 23 November 1702, governor of New France Louis-Hector de Callière gave a seigneury to Philippe de Vaudreuil, who was governor of Montreal at the time. Rigaud de Vaudreuil later became governor of New France.

In 1725, the region had only 38 inhabitants. Around 1742, people began to be interested in the region and Vaudreuil's population rose. 381 people lived in Vaudreuil in 1765. With the creation of the Grand Trunk Railway, people began to live in Dorion, which was called Vaudreuil Station. Dorion became a village in 1891.

Dorion was bisected by Autoroute 20 which links Downtown Montreal and Toronto via Highway 401 in Ontario. The Canadian National Railway and Canadian Pacific Railway links between Toronto and Montreal are located in Dorion. Housing developments began in the 1950s and continued well into the 1970s. Throughout the 1980s and the 1990s, housing began sprouting north and east of Dorion.

Vaudreuil and Dorion merged in 1994, becoming the City of Vaudreuil-Dorion.

== Geography ==
Vaudreuil-Dorion is located on the south shores of the Lake of Two Mountains at the confluence of the Saint Lawrence and Ottawa Rivers, just off the western edge of Île Perrot. The city consists of two non-contiguous parts: its eastern part is the larger main area along Lake of Two Mountains where the population centres of Vaudreuil and Dorion are located; the western portion is a smaller rural area that borders Rigaud, and is separated from the eastern portion by Saint-Lazare and Hudson.

== Sectors ==
Vaudreuil-Dorion is organized into historic villages, developed sectors, and electoral districts, primarily structured around the former municipalities of Vaudreuil and Dorion, according to local heritage guides and municipal maps.

=== Historical Sectors and Neighbourhoods ===
- Old Vaudreuil (Saint-Michel): The original 1783 grid-pattern village core, serving as the historical religious and institutional center.
- Les Chenaux: A scenic, historic waterfront residential area bordering Vaudreuil Bay. It is noted for the historic Maison Félix-Leclerc and the childhood home of Canon Lionel Groulx.
- Dorion Core (Vaudreuil-Station): Developed around the 1854 railway expansion, this area features late 19th-century architecture and acted as an independent town until 1994.
- Cité-des-Jeunes: The city's main educational and recreational hub on Vaudreuil Bay, featuring a 1960s master-planned campus, the École secondaire de la Cité-des-Jeunes, and the Théâtre Paul-Émile-Meloche.
- Harwood Boulevard (De Lotbinière): A major transit corridor currently undergoing redevelopment into a dense, mixed-use commercial and residential zone.
- Dorion Gardens: A planned residential community developed between 1956 and 1958, highlighting mid-century suburban design trends.

=== Administrative Wards ===
The city is divided into eight electoral districts for municipal governance:

1. Quinchien (South/Transitional)

2. Valois (Residential)

3. Des Bâtisseurs (Modern Suburbs)

4. De la Seigneurie (Waterfront area)

5. Des Chenaux (Northern residential)

6. Saint-Michel (Historical core)

7. Desrochers (Commercial/Industrial)

8. De la Baie (Coastal/Bay area)

=== Climate ===
Vaudreuil-Dorion has a humid continental climate (Köppen: Dfb).

Climate data for Vaudreuil-Dorion
Month	Jan	Feb	Mar	Apr	May	Jun	Jul	Aug	Sep	Oct	Nov	Dec	Year
Mean daily maximum °C (°F)	−5.0 (23.0)	−3.2 (26.2)	2.4 (36.3)	10.1 (50.2)	18.0 (64.4)	23.0 (73.4)	25.7 (78.3)	24.8 (76.6)	20.8 (69.4)	13.2 (55.8)	5.8 (42.4)	−1.5 (29.3)	11.2 (52.1)
Daily mean °C (°F)	−8.7 (16.3)	−7.4 (18.7)	−1.6 (29.1)	5.8 (42.4)	13.5 (56.3)	18.8 (65.8)	21.5 (70.7)	20.4 (68.7)	16.2 (61.2)	9.4 (48.9)	2.7 (36.9)	−4.5 (23.9)	7.2 (44.9)
Mean daily minimum °C (°F)	−13.0 (8.6)	−12.1 (10.2)	−5.9 (21.4)	1.7 (35.1)	8.8 (47.8)	14.2 (57.6)	17.1 (62.8)	16.2 (61.2)	12.0 (53.6)	5.8 (42.4)	−0.5 (31.1)	−8.0 (17.6)	3.0 (37.5)
Average precipitation mm (inches)	61.3 (2.41)	57.2 (2.25)	59.7 (2.35)	74.4 (2.93)	65.0 (2.56)	87.7 (3.45)	78.7 (3.10)	81.5 (3.21)	65.1 (2.56)	69.7 (2.74)	60.8 (2.39)	77.8 (3.06)	838.9 (33.01)
Source: Weather.Directory

== Demographics ==
Historical Census Data - Vaudreuil-Dorion, Quebec

Year	Pop.	±%
1996	18,466	—
2001	19,920	+7.9%
2006	25,789	+29.5%

Year	Pop.	±%
2011	33,305	+29.1%
2016	38,117	+14.4%
2021	43,268	+13.5%

Source: Statistics Canada

In the 2021 Census of Population conducted by Statistics Canada, Vaudreuil-Dorion had a population of 43,268 living in 16,713 of its 17,260 total private dwellings, a change of 13.5% from its 2016 population of 38,117. With a land area of 72.65 km^{2} (28.05 sq mi), it had a population density of 595.6/km^{2} (1,542.5/sq mi) in 2021.

Canada census – Vaudreuil-Dorion community profile

	2021	2016	2011
Population	43,268 (13.5% from 2016)	38,117 (+14.4% from 2011)	33,305 (+29.1% from 2006)
Land area	72.65 km^{2} (28.05 sq mi)	72.73 km^{2} (28.08 sq mi)	72.52 km^{2} (28.00 sq mi)
Population density	595.5/km^{2} (1,542/sq mi)	524.1/km^{2} (1,357/sq mi)	459.3/km^{2} (1,190/sq mi)
Median age	40.8 (M: 39.6, F: 41.6)	38.6 (M: 38.0, F: 39.3)	37.1 (M: 36.4, F: 37.8)
Private dwellings	17,260 (total)	14,853 (total)	13,292 (total)
Median household income	$89,000	$77,341	$69,772

References: 2021 2016 2011

Canada Census Mother Tongue - Vaudreuil-Dorion, Quebec
Census	Total	French			English			French & English			Other		
Year	Responses	Count	Trend	Pop %	Count	Trend	Pop %	Count	Trend	Pop %	Count	Trend	Pop %
2021	42,585	20,660	▼4.6%	48.5%	9,715	▲23.1%	22.8%	1,505	▲84.7%	3.5%	9,130	▲43.3%	21.4%
2016	37,590	21,665	▲0.2%	57.6%	7,895	▲21.6%	21.0%	815	▲114.0%	2.2%	6,370	▲50.5%	17.0%
2011	32,590	21,245	▲14.0%	65.2%	6,495	▲56.1%	19.9%	610	▲34.4%	1.9%	4,240	▲82.4%	13.0%
2006	25,400	18,630	▲14.6%	73.4%	4,160	▲57.9%	16.4%	285	▲72.7%	1.1%	2,325	▲294.1%	9.2%
2001	19,650	16,260	▲11.5%	82.8%	2,635	▼8.0%	13.4%	165	▼36.5%	0.8%	590	▲22.9%	3.0%
1996	18,185	14,580	n/a	80.2%	2,865	n/a	15.8%	260	n/a	1.4%	480	n/a	2.6%

== Economy ==
Première Moisson Bakery was founded in Dorion in 1991. The products (breads, cakes, pastries and pastries) are still prepared and distributed in its various branches across Quebec. As of July 2013, the Chamber of Commerce and Industry of Vaudreuil-Dorion (CCIVD) will serve the territory of the MRC de Vaudreuil-Soulanges.

== Government ==
Vaudreuil-Dorion federal election results
Year	Liberal		Conservative		Bloc Québécois		New Democratic		Green	
2025	54%	12,251	24%	5,368	17%	3,858	3%	565	1%	323
2021	49%	9,522	15%	2,921	22%	4,340	10%	2,021	2%	419
2019	48%	10,151	11%	2,324	25%	5,166	11%	2,247	4%	917
2015	48%	9,071	13%	2,546	15%	2,894	22%	4,193	2%	378
2011	12%	1,761	16%	2,292	25%	3,715	44%	6,456	3%	388
2008	21%	2,776	22%	2,872	44%	5,723	10%	1,285	4%	474
2006	25%	3,104	18%	2,209	47%	5,760	5%	667	4%	506
2004	36%	3,992	7%	783	49%	5,388	4%	415	3%	360

Vaudreuil-Dorion provincial election results
Year	CAQ		Liberal		QC solidaire		Parti Québécois	
2022	26%	3,012	37%	4,329	10%	1,206	8%	890
2018	34%	5,757	38%	6,548	10%	1,802	11%	1,878
2014	17%	3,218	57%	10,950	5%	1,037	18%	3,465
2012	27%	4,670	40%	6,907	6%	1,056	23%	4,056

Vaudreuil-Dorion forms part of the federal electoral district of Vaudreuil—Soulanges and has been represented by Peter Schiefke of the Liberal Party since 2015. Provincially, Vaudreuil-Dorion is part of the Vaudreuil electoral district and is represented by Marie-Claude Nichols of the Quebec Liberal Party since 2014.

List of former mayors:

- Jean Lemaire (1994–1998)
- Réjean Boyer (1998–2005)
- Guy Pilon (2005–2025)
- Paul Dumoulin (2025–)

== Infrastructure ==
The city is the point of intersection for three of Canada's busiest highways: Autoroute 40/Autoroute 30/Autoroute 20 (connecting the Quebec City-Windsor Corridor) and Highway 417 connects to Ottawa and Arnprior, Autoroute 20 and Highway 401 connects Toronto to Montreal and Autoroute 30 is Montreal's Southern Bypass.

Local bus service is operated by Exo La Presqu'Île, connecting to the Vaudreuil and Dorion stations on the Vaudreuil-Hudson commuter rail line.

== Education ==
Commission scolaire des Trois-Lacs operates Francophone public schools:

- École Brind'Amour Pavillon P
- École Sainte-Madeleine
- École Saint-Michel
- École Harwood (serves sector Dorion-Garden)
- École du Papillon-Bleu (pavillon St-Jean-Baptiste and pavillon Sainte-Trinité)
- École Hymne-au-Printemps
- École Secondaire de la Cité-des-Jeunes

Lester B. Pearson School Board operates Anglophone public schools:

- Pierre Elliot Trudeau Elementary School
- Other sections are zoned to Mount Pleasant Elementary School in Hudson, St. Patrick Elementary School in Pincourt, and Birchwood Elementary School and Evergreen Elementary School in Saint-Lazare.

== Media ==
CJVD-FM operates studios in Vaudreuil-Dorion, broadcasting at 100.1 FM in Vaudreuil-Soulanges, the West Island and Salaberry-de-Valleyfield. On the air since 2008, CJVD airs a French and English hits format spanning from the 1960s to 1995.

== Notable people ==
- Christian Chagnon - handball player who competed in the 1976 Summer Olympics
- André Hainault - soccer player, Canada and Houston Dynamo
- Constant Montpellier - jockey
- Norbert Murphy - archer, Paralympic bronze medalist
- Hormisdas Pilon - Quebec politician
- Sasha Pokulok - ice hockey defenceman
- Marc-André Servant - ice dancer
- Maxime Deschamps - figure skater
- Lionel Groulx - Quebec nationalist

== See also ==
- List of anglophone communities in Quebec
- List of cities in Quebec
