= Terrasse-Vaudreuil =

- Municipality
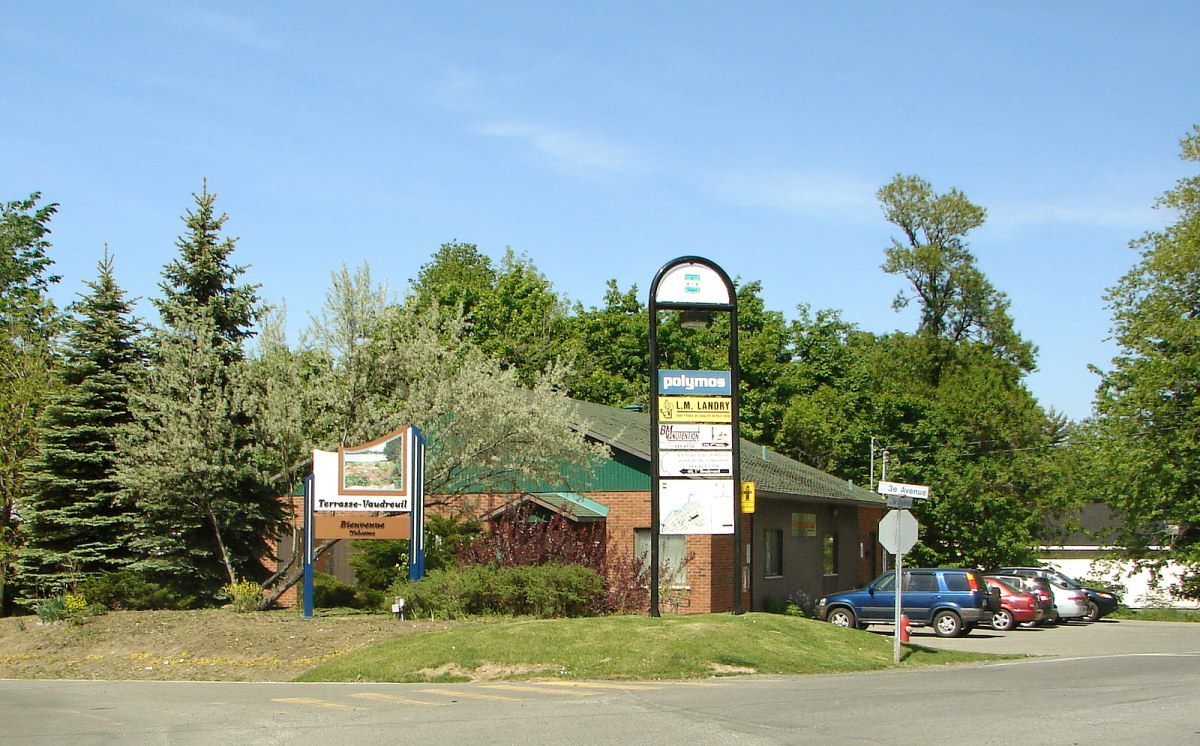

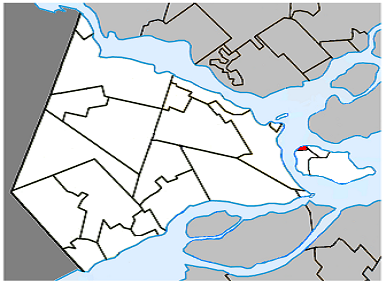
- Location within Vaudreuil-Soulanges RCM

- Location in southern Quebec
- Coordinates: 45°24′N 73°59′W
- Country: Canada
- Province: Quebec
- Region: Montérégie
- RCM: Vaudreuil-Soulanges
- Constituted: 1 January 1952

Government
  - Mayor: Michel Bourdeau
  - Federal riding: Vaudreuil
  - Prov. riding: Vaudreuil

Area
  - Total: 1.20 km^{2} (0.46 sq mi)
  - Land: 1.06 km^{2} (0.41 sq mi)

Population (2016)
  - Total: 1,986
  - Density: 1,865.8/km^{2} (4,832/sq mi)
  - Pop 2011-2016: ▲0.8%
  - Dwellings: 830
- Time zone: UTC−5 (EST)
  - Summer (DST): UTC−4 (EDT)
- Postal code(s): J7V
- Area codes: 514 and 438
- Website: www.terrasse-vaudreuil.ca

Terrasse-Vaudreuil (French pronunciation: [tɛʁas vodʁœj]) is a small municipality on Île Perrot, just west of Montreal Island in Quebec, Canada.

== History ==
At the beginning of the 20th century, Terrasse-Vaudreuil was the site of a large powder magazine.

In 1948, its post office opened under the name Terrasse-Vaudreuil, in reference to its location on Lake of Two Mountains and its view towards Vaudreuil Bay and the town of Vaudreuil. In the 1950s, it began to see rapid residential development. The municipality was formed in 1952 when it separated from the Parish Municipality of Notre-Dame-de-l'Île-Perrot. In 1963, the post office closed.

Terrasse-Vaudreuil is the first city in Canada and the world to sign on to the Universal Declaration of the Rights of the Tree.

== Demographics ==
Canada census – Terrasse-Vaudreuil community profile

	2016	2011
Population	1,986 (0.8% from 2011)	1,971 (-0.7% from 2006)
Land area	1.06 km^{2} (0.41 sq mi)	1.04 km^{2} (0.40 sq mi)
Population density	1,865.8/km^{2} (4,832/sq mi)	1,903.6/km^{2} (4,930/sq mi)
Median age	42.6 (M: 41.3, F: 43.6)	42.6 (M: 41.7, F: 43.4)
Private dwellings	830 (total)	829 (total)
Median household income	$74,624	$61,777

References: 2016 2011

Historical census populations – Terrasse-Vaudreuil, Quebec

Year	Pop.	±%
1976	1,812	—
1981	1,753	−3.3%
1986	1,665	−5.0%
1991	1,744	+4.7%
1996	1,977	+13.4%

Year	Pop.	±%
2001	2,047	+3.5%
2006	1,985	−3.0%
2011	1,971	−0.7%
2016	1,986	+0.8%

Source: Statistics Canada

=== Language ===
Canada Census Mother Tongue - Terrasse-Vaudreuil, Quebec
Census	Total	French			English			French & English			Other		
Year	Responses	Count	Trend	Pop %	Count	Trend	Pop %	Count	Trend	Pop %	Count	Trend	Pop %
2011	1,955	1,320	▼2.6%	67.52%	440	▲7.3%	22.51%	40	▲100.0%	2.04%	155	▼20.5%	7.93%
2006	1,980	1,355	▼17.6%	68.43%	410	▲36.7%	20.71%	20	0.0%	1.01%	195	▲160.0%	9.85%
2001	2,040	1,645	▲7.2%	80.64%	300	▼13.0%	14.71%	20	▼42.9%	0.98%	75	▲25.0%	3.67%
1996	1,975	1,535	n/a	77.72%	345	n/a	17.47%	35	n/a	1.77%	60	n/a	3.04%

== Local government ==
List of former mayors:

- Donat Bouthillier (1952-1963, 1966-1975)
- Gérard Martin (1963-1966)
- Ronald Bourdeau (1975-1988)
- Paul-Émile Lamarche (1989-1998)
- Bernard Renaud (1998-2005)
- André Reynolds (2005-2009)
- Manon Trudel (2009-2013)
- Michel Bourdeau (2013–present)

== Education ==
Commission Scolaire des Trois-Lacs operates Francophone schools.

- École José-Maria

Lester B. Pearson School Board operates Anglophone schools. It is zoned to Edgewater Elementary School and St. Patrick Elementary School in Pincourt.

== See also ==
- List of anglophone communities in Quebec
- List of municipalities in Quebec
