= Dorion station =

Railway station in Quebec, Canada

Dorion
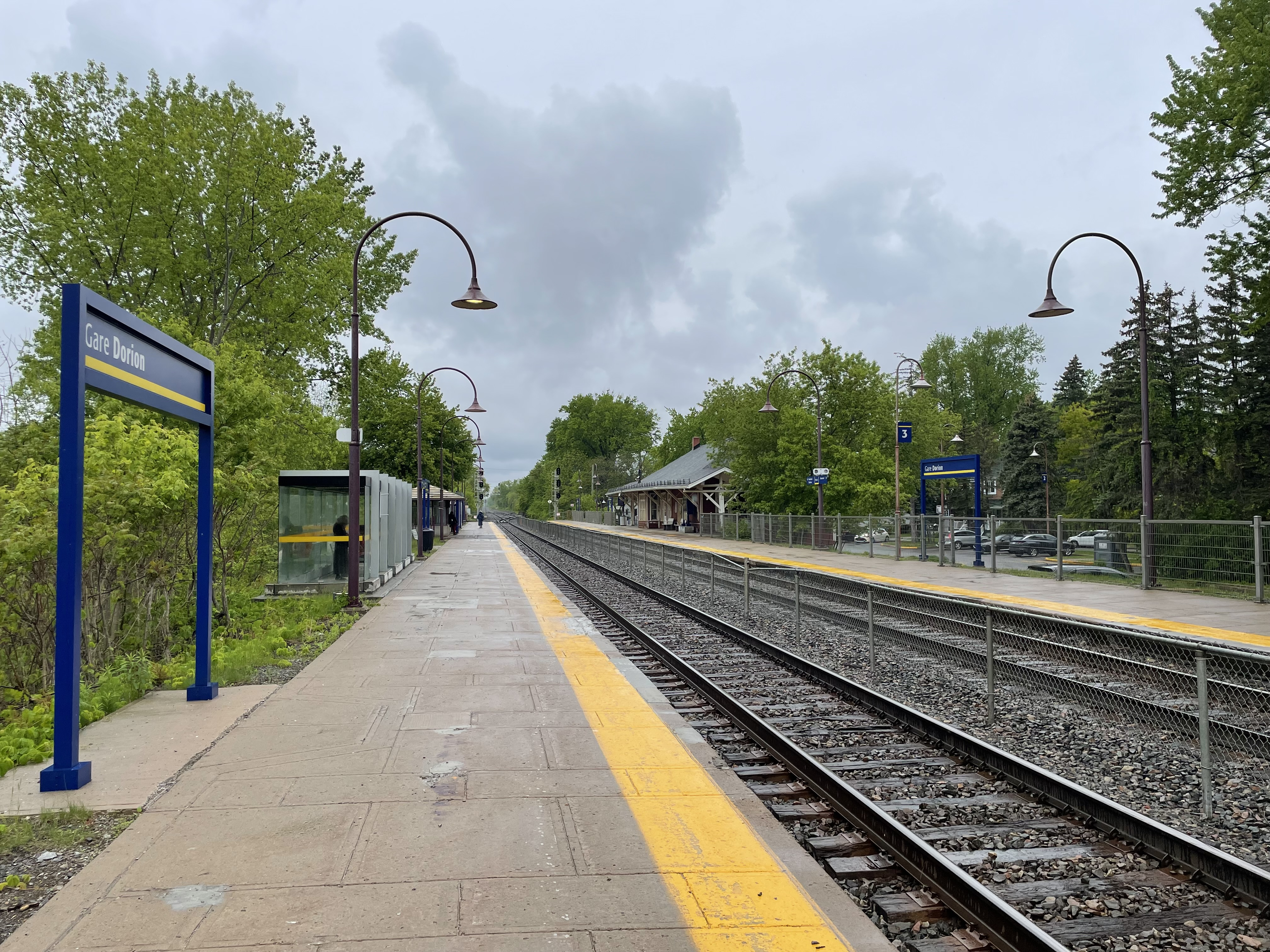

General information
- Location: 60 Church Street; Vaudreuil-Dorion, Quebec J7V 1W4
- Coordinates: 45°23′11″N 74°00′30″W
- Operator: Exo
- Platforms: 2 side platforms
- Tracks: 2
- Connections: Exo bus services

Construction
- Parking: 103 Park-and-Ride, 2 Carpooling, and 1 Disabled spaces
- Cycle facilities: 35 spaces

Other information
- Fare zone: ARTM: C
- Website: Dorion station (exo.quebec)

History
- Opened: 1887
- Former names: Vaudreuil (Canadian Pacific station)

Passengers
- 2019: 168,400 (Exo)

Services
Preceding station	Exo	Following station
Vaudreuil toward Hudson	Line 11 – Vaudreuil–Hudson	Pincourt–Terrasse-Vaudreuil toward Lucien-L'Allier
Former services at Vaudreuil (Dorion)
Preceding station	Canadian Pacific Railway	Following station
Como toward Ottawa	Ottawa – Montreal; Short Line	Ste. Annes toward Montreal Windsor
Isle Cadieux toward Rigaud	Montreal – Rigaud local stops	Ste. Annes toward Montreal Windsor
Location

Dorion station (French pronunciation: [dɔʁjɔ̃]) is a commuter rail station operated by Exo in Vaudreuil-Dorion, Quebec, Canada. It is served by the Vaudreuil–Hudson line. As of October 2020, on weekdays, 10 inbound trains and 11 outbound trains on the line call at this station (in both cases, all trains on the line except one short-turned train); on weekends, all trains (four on Saturday and three on Sunday in each direction) call here.

Dorion station consists of two side platforms, with access between them via a roadway underpass about 80 metres away from the end of the platform. The station was opened in 1887; the historic station building still stands but no longer serves passengers, and was leased in 1999 to a mental health services organization.

== Connecting bus routes ==
Exo La Presqu'Île sector
No.	Route	Connects to	Service times / notes
190	Terminus Vaudreuil - St-Charles - Gare Dorion	Vaudreuil	Daily
191	Terminus Vaudreuil - Valois - Gare Dorion	Vaudreuil	Daily
200	Gare Dorion - Chicoine		Daily
591	Gare Dorion - Île Perrot - REM	Anse-à-l'Orme; Île-Perrot	Weekdays only
793	Gare Dorion - Île Perrot - Terminus Macdonald	Île-Perrot; Terminus Macdonald	Weekdays only
