= Beaurepaire station =

Railway station in Montreal, Quebec, Canada

Beaurepaire
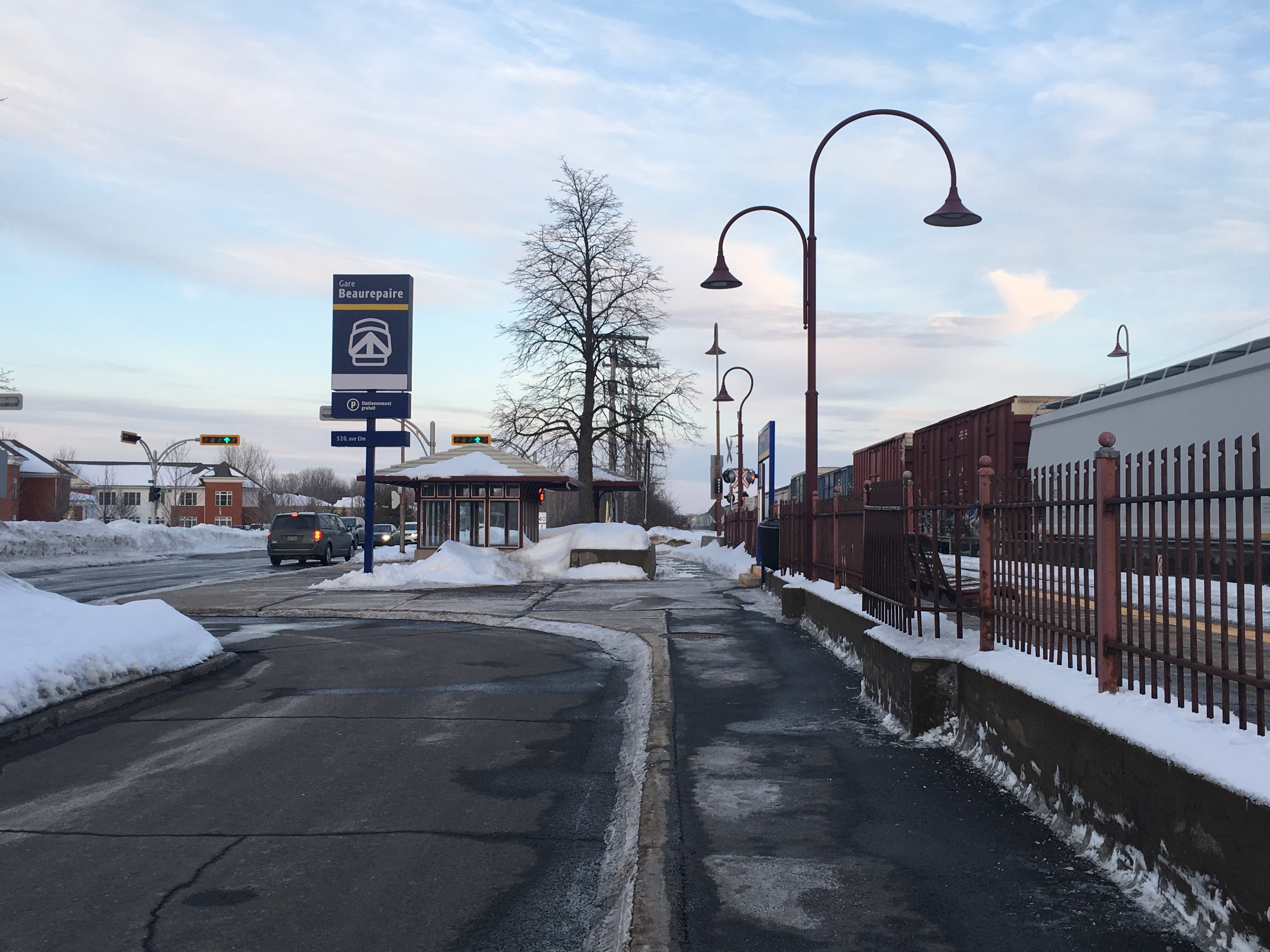
- Beaurepaire train station, facing towards the Beaconsfield train station

General information
- Location: 114 Woodland Avenue; Beaconsfield, Quebec H9W 4W1
- Coordinates: 45°25′39″N 73°53′14″W
- Operator: Exo
- Platforms: 2 side platforms
- Tracks: 2
- Connections: STM bus; STM taxibus

Construction
- Parking: 41 Park-and-Ride spaces
- Cycle facilities: 31 spaces

Other information
- Fare zone: ARTM: A
- Website: Beaurepaire Station (RTM)

Passengers
- 2019: 204,300 (Exo)

Services
Preceding station	Exo	Following station
Baie-D'Urfé toward Hudson	Line 11 – Vaudreuil–Hudson	Beaconsfield toward Lucien-L'Allier
Former services
Preceding station	Canadian Pacific Railway	Following station
Baie d'Urfé toward Rigaud	Montreal – Rigaud local stops	Beaconsfield toward Montreal Windsor
Location

Beaurepaire station (French pronunciation: [boʁpɛʁ]) is a commuter rail station operated by operated by Exo in Beaconsfield, Quebec, Canada, located in the Beaurepaire neighborhood. It is served by the Vaudreuil–Hudson line.

As of October 2020, on weekdays, 9 of 11 inbound trains and 10 of 12 outbound trains on the line call at this station, the exceptions in both cases being one short turn and one skipped stop. On weekends, all trains (four on Saturday and three on Sunday in each direction) call here.

The station is located at the corner of Elm Avenue and Woodland Avenue, north of Autoroute 20. It has two side platforms; access between them is provided by the Woodland Avenue level crossing. The station is equipped with shelters but there is no station building.

The first Beaurepaire station, opened by 1902, was located east of Woodland Avenue. It was replaced by the current station, located just east of the original site, by 1972.

== Connecting bus routes ==
Société de transport de Montréal
No.	Route	Connects to	Service times / notes
295	Beaurepaire		Taxibus
354 ☾	Sainte-Anne-de-Bellevue / Centre-ville	Atwater; Dorval; Pointe-Claire; Beaconsfield; Baie d'Urfé; Sainte-Anne-de-Bellevue	Night service
