= Pointe-Claire station =

Railway station in Canada

Pointe-Claire
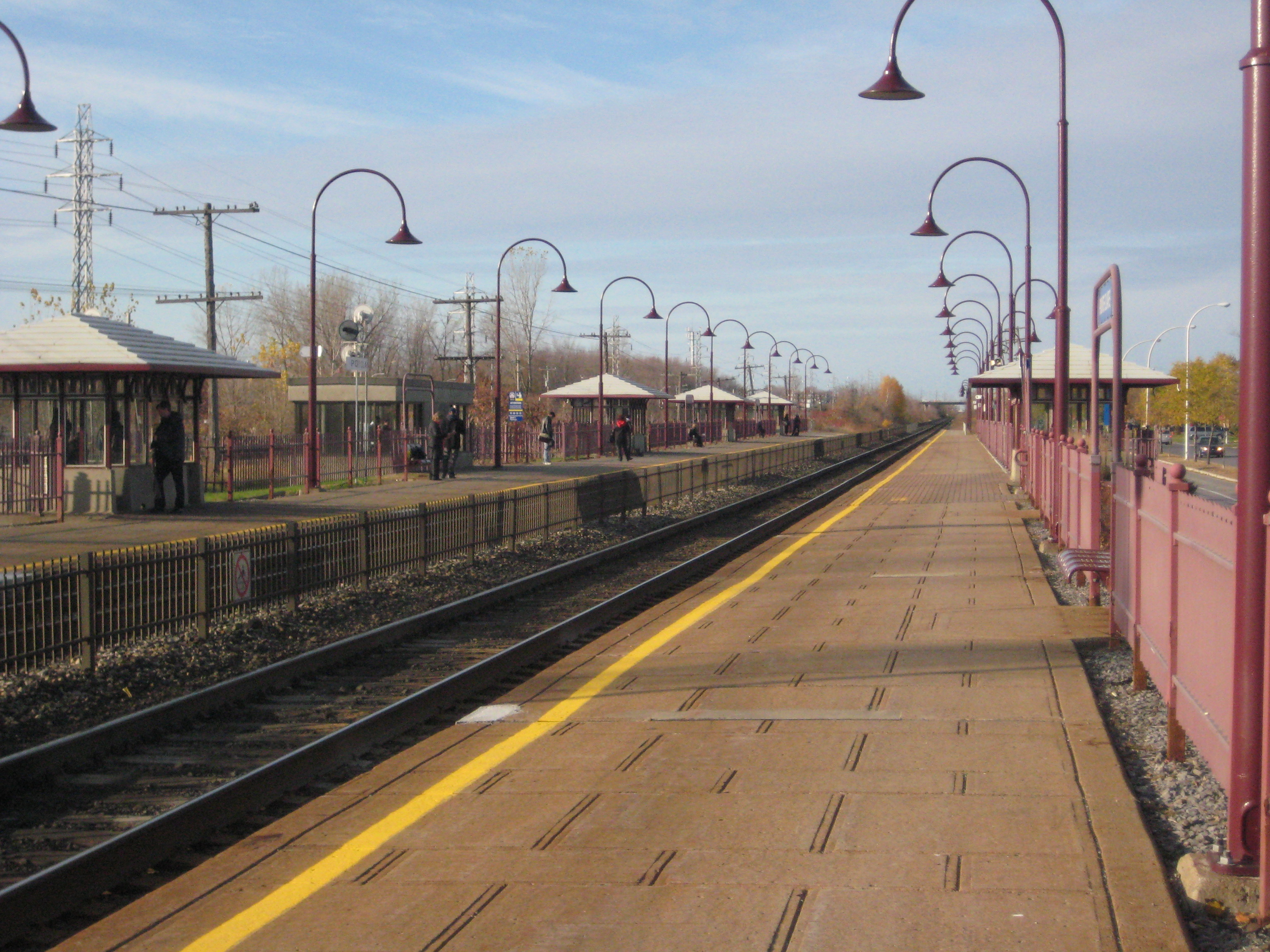

General information
- Location: 300 Donegani Avenue; Pointe-Claire, Quebec H9R 2V4
- Coordinates: 45°26′50″N 73°48′12″W
- Operator: Exo
- Platforms: 2 side platforms
- Tracks: 2
- Connections: STM bus

Construction
- Parking: 587 Park-and-Ride, 2 Carpooling, and 2 Disabled spaces
- Cycle facilities: 61 spaces

Other information
- Fare zone: ARTM: A
- Website: Pointe-Claire Station (RTM)

Passengers
- 2019: 384,600 (Exo)

Services
Preceding station	Exo	Following station
Cedar Park toward Hudson	Line 11 – Vaudreuil–Hudson	Valois toward Lucien-L'Allier
Former services
Preceding station	Canadian Pacific Railway	Following station
Cedar Park toward Rigaud	Montreal – Rigaud local stops	Valois toward Montreal Windsor
Location

Pointe-Claire station is a commuter rail station operated by Exo in Pointe-Claire, Quebec, Canada. It is served by the Vaudreuil–Hudson line.

As of December 2024, on weekdays, all 13 inbound trains and 14 outbound trains on the line call at this station. On weekends, all trains (four on Saturday and three on Sunday in each direction) call here.

The station is located north of Autoroute 20 at the corner of Donegani and Ashgrove avenues. The station's two side platforms are connected by a pedestrian tunnel, with headhouses on either platform, in a parking lot located between the highway and the tracks, and on the south side of the highway.

This station was opened as Lakeside in 1902; the name Pointe-Claire originally belonged to a different station, located west of here beyond Cedar Park station. Both stations were closed in 1980, but when a park and ride station was found to be needed, the Lakeside site was chosen, and the station rebuilt and reopened in 1986. Days after its reopening it was renamed Pointe-Claire.

== Connecting bus routes ==
Société de transport de Montréal
No.	Route	Connects to	Service times / notes
203	Carson	Fairview-Pointe-Claire; Valois; Dorval	Daily
211	Bord-du-Lac	Kirkland; Beaconsfield; Pine Beach; Dorval; Lionel-Groulx	Daily
354 ☾	Sainte-Anne-de-Bellevue / Centre-ville	Atwater; Dorval; Beaconsfield; Beaurepaire; Baie d'Urfé; Sainte-Anne-de-Bellevue	Night service
411	Express Lionel-Groulx	Pine Beach; Dorval; Lionel-Groulx	Daily
