= Sainte-Anne-de-Bellevue station =

Railway station in Quebec, Canada

Sainte-Anne-de-Bellevue
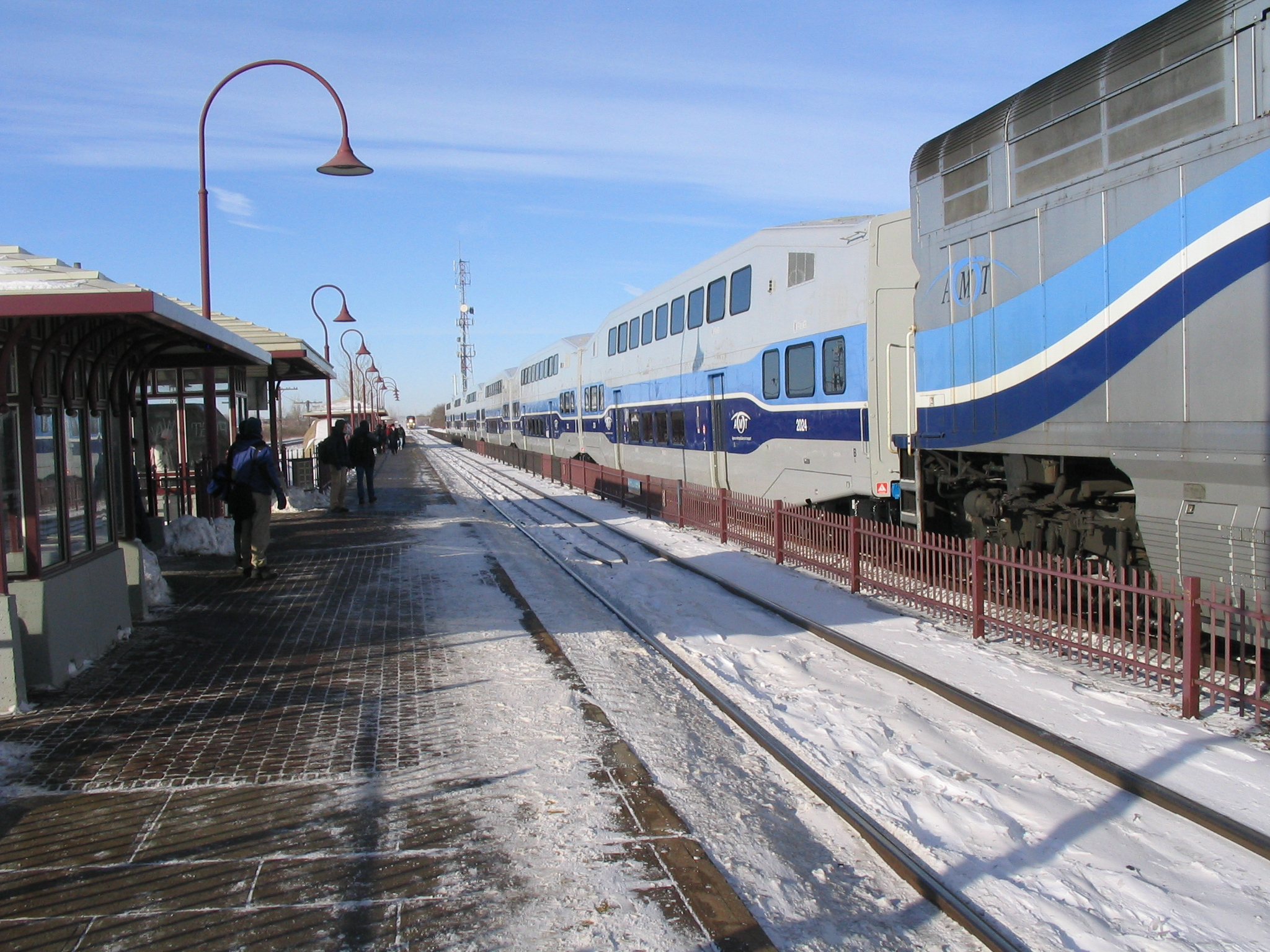

General information
- Location: 105 Veterans Boulevard; Sainte-Anne-de-Bellevue, Quebec H9X 1Y9
- Coordinates: 45°24′28″N 73°57′04″W
- Operator: Exo
- Platforms: 2 side platforms
- Tracks: 2
- Connections: STM bus; STM taxibus

Construction
- Parking: 287 Park-and-Ride, 2 Carpooling, and 3 Disabled spaces
- Cycle facilities: 22 spaces

Other information
- Fare zone: ARTM: A
- Website: Sainte-Anne-de-Bellevue Station (RTM)

Passengers
- 2019: 194,700 (Exo)

Services
Preceding station	Exo	Following station
Île-Perrot toward Hudson	Line 11 – Vaudreuil–Hudson	Baie-D'Urfé toward Lucien-L'Allier
Former services at Ste. Annes
Preceding station	Canadian Pacific Railway	Following station
Vaudreuil toward Ottawa	Ottawa – Montreal; Short Line	Pointe Claire toward Montreal Windsor
Vaudreuil toward Rigaud	Montreal – Rigaud local stops	Beaurepaire toward Montreal Windsor
Location

Sainte-Anne-de-Bellevue station (French pronunciation: [sɛ̃t an də bɛlvy]) is a commuter rail station operated by Exo in Sainte-Anne-de-Bellevue, Quebec, Canada. It is served by the Vaudreuil–Hudson line.

As of October 2020, on weekdays, 10 of 11 inbound trains and 11 of 12 outbound trains on the line call at this station; the one exception each way is a short turned train. On weekends, all trains (four on Saturday and three on Sunday in each direction) call here.

The station is built on an overpass above Boulevard des Anciens-Combattants (Veterans Road). It has two side platforms; access between them is provided by the sidewalks on either side of Boulevard des Anciens-Combattants, to which the platforms are connected by stairwells covered with distinctive hexagonal canopies. The inbound platform, only about half as long as the outbound platform, is equipped with a small station building.

== Connecting bus routes ==
Société de transport de Montréal
No.	Route	Connects to	Service times / notes
212	Sainte-Anne	Anse-à-l'Orme	Daily
281	Senneville / Sainte-Anne-de-Bellevue	Anse-à-l'Orme	
354 ☾	Sainte-Anne-de-Bellevue / Centre-ville	Atwater; Dorval; Pointe-Claire; Beaconsfield; Beaurepaire; Baie d'Urfé	Night service
