= Baie-D'Urfé station =

Railway station in Montreal, Quebec, Canada

Baie-D'Urfé
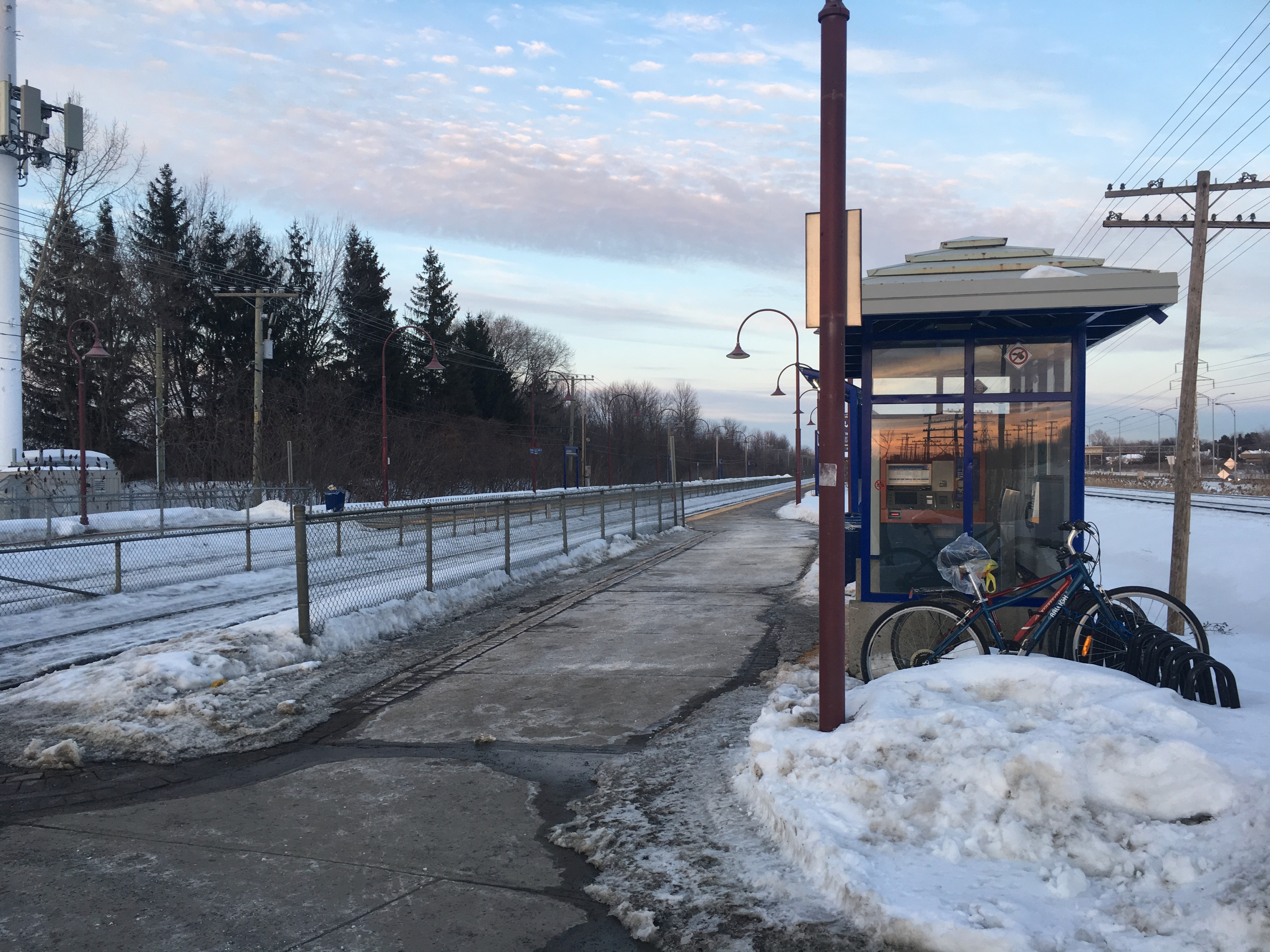
- Pay booth and platform at the train station

General information
- Location: 101 Morgan Street; Baie-D'Urfé, Quebec H9X 3A3
- Coordinates: 45°25′12″N 73°54′56″W
- Operator: Exo
- Platforms: 2 side platforms
- Tracks: 2
- Connections: STM bus; STM taxibus

Construction
- Parking: 72 park and ride spaces
- Cycle facilities: 15 spaces

Other information
- Fare zone: ARTM: A
- Website: Baie-D'Urfe Station (RTM)

Passengers
- 2019: 100,600 (Exo)

Services
| Preceding station | Exo | Following station |
|---|---|---|
| Sainte-Anne-de-Bellevue toward Hudson | Line 11 – Vaudreuil–Hudson | Beaurepaire toward Lucien-L'Allier |
Former services
| Preceding station | Canadian Pacific Railway | Following station |
|---|---|---|
| Ste. Annes toward Rigaud | Montreal – Rigaud local stops | Beaurepaire toward Montreal Windsor |
Location

Baie-D'Urfé station (French: [bɛ dyʁfe], Canadian French: [be d͡zʏʁˈfe]) is a commuter rail station operated by Exo in Baie-D'Urfé, Quebec, Canada. It is served by the Vaudreuil–Hudson line.

As of October 2020, on weekdays, 10 of 11 inbound trains and 11 of 12 outbound trains on the line call at this station; the one exception each way is a short turned train. On weekends, all trains (four on Saturday and three on Sunday in each direction) call here.

The station is located north of the Boulevard Morgan underpass under Autoroute 20, and is connected to the end of the underpass via a stairwell and a level crossing over both the CN and CP tracks. It has two side platforms; access between them is provided by the level crossings. The inbound platform is equipped with shelters but there is no station building.

The first Baie-D'Urfé station was opened in 1899; it was originally named Bayview until 1902. This station was closed and replaced by the current station, located just east of the original site, by 1972.

== Connecting bus routes ==
Société de transport de Montréal
| No. | Route | Connects to | Service times / notes |
|---|---|---|---|
| 223 | Parc industriel Baie-D'Urfé | Anse-à-l'Orme | Weekdays, peak only |
| 284 | Baie-D’Urfé | | Weekdays only |
| 294 | Parc industriel Baie-D'Urfé | Anse-à-l'Orme | Taxibus |
| 354 ☾ | Sainte-Anne-de-Bellevue / Centre-ville | Atwater; Dorval; Pointe-Claire; Beaconsfield; Beaurepaire; Sainte-Anne-de-Bellevue | Night service |
