= Exo La Presqu'Île sector =

- Parent: Exo
- Founded: 2017
- Service area: Vaudreuil, L'Île-Perrot, Saint-Lazare, Hudson, Pincourt
- Service type: bus service, paratransit, on-demand taxibus
- Routes: 28
- Destinations: Montreal
- Hubs: Vaudreuil station
- Annual ridership: 776,593 (2024)
- Operator: Groupe Transbus

The Exo La Presqu'Île sector is the division of Exo that delivers bus service to the western suburbs of Montreal that lie along the south side of the Ottawa River in the regional county municipality of Vaudreuil-Soulanges, Quebec, Canada. All bus routes connect the residents of the communities of Hudson, Vaudreuil-Dorion, Pincourt, L'Île-Perrot, Notre-Dame-de-l'Île-Perrot, Saint-Lazare and Rigaud to stations on the Vaudreuil-Hudson commuter rail line.

Bus service in this region made its debut in May 2005 through CIT La Presqu'Île (French: Conseil intermunicipal de transport La Presqu'Île, lit. 'The Presqu'Île Intercity Transit Commission') when the town of Vaudreuil-Dorion started a shuttle service to the train during rush hours and was followed in 2007 by Pincourt and Hudson offering the same service. A combination of coach buses and midibuses were used in CIT La Presqu'Île's fleet. In June 2017, CIT La Presqu'Île was merged with many other agencies to form Exo, which continues to provide the same services.

== Services ==
=== Local bus routes ===
Local routes
| No. | Route | Connects to | Service times / notes |
|---|---|---|---|
| 188 | Terminus Vaudreuil - Hudson | Vaudreuil; Hudson | Weekdays only |
| 189 | Terminus Vaudreuil - Saint-Lazare | Vaudreuil | Weekdays only |
| 190 | Terminus Vaudreuil - St-Charles - Gare Dorion | Vaudreuil; Dorion | Daily |
| 191 | Terminus Vaudreuil - Valois - Gare Dorion | Vaudreuil; Dorion | Daily |
| 192 | Terminus Vaudreuil - Joseph-Carrier | Vaudreuil | Weekdays only |
| 193 | Terminus Vaudreuil - Ouimet - Floralies | Vaudreuil | Weekdays only |
| 194 | Terminus Vaudreuil - Émile-Bouchard - Floralies | Vaudreuil | Weekdays only |
| 200 | Gare Dorion - Chicoine | Dorion | Daily |
| 210 | Gare Île-Perrot - Pointe-aux-Renards | Île-Perrot | Weekdays only |
| 211 | Gare Île-Perrot - Pointe-du-Moulin | Île-Perrot | Weekdays only |
| 212 | Gare Île-Perrot - Perrot | Île-Perrot | Weekdays only |

=== Express / regional bus routes ===
Express / regional routes
| No. | Route | Connects to | Service times / notes |
|---|---|---|---|
| 490 | Terminus Vaudreuil - Bourget - REM | Vaudreuil; Anse-à-l'Orme | Daily |
| 491 | Terminus Vaudreuil - REM | Vaudreuil; Anse-à-l'Orme | Weekdays only |
| 493 | Terminus Vaudreuil - Cégep John Abbott | Vaudreuil | Weekdays only |
| 591 | Gare Dorion - Île Perrot - REM | Dorion; Île-Perrot; Anse-à-l'Orme | Weekdays only |
| 593 | Notre-Dame-de-l'Île-Perrot - Terminus Macdonald | Île-Perrot | Weekdays only |
| 695 | Rigaud - Terminus Vaudreuil | Vaudreuil | Weekdays only |
| 790 | Dorion - Île Perrot - REM | Anse-à-l'Orme | Weekends only |
| 793 | Gare Dorion - Île Perrot - Terminus Macdonald | Dorion; Île-Perrot | Weekdays only |

== See also ==
- Exo (public transit) bus services
- Vaudreuil-Hudson Line list of stations
