= Lachine station =

Railway station in Canada

Lachine
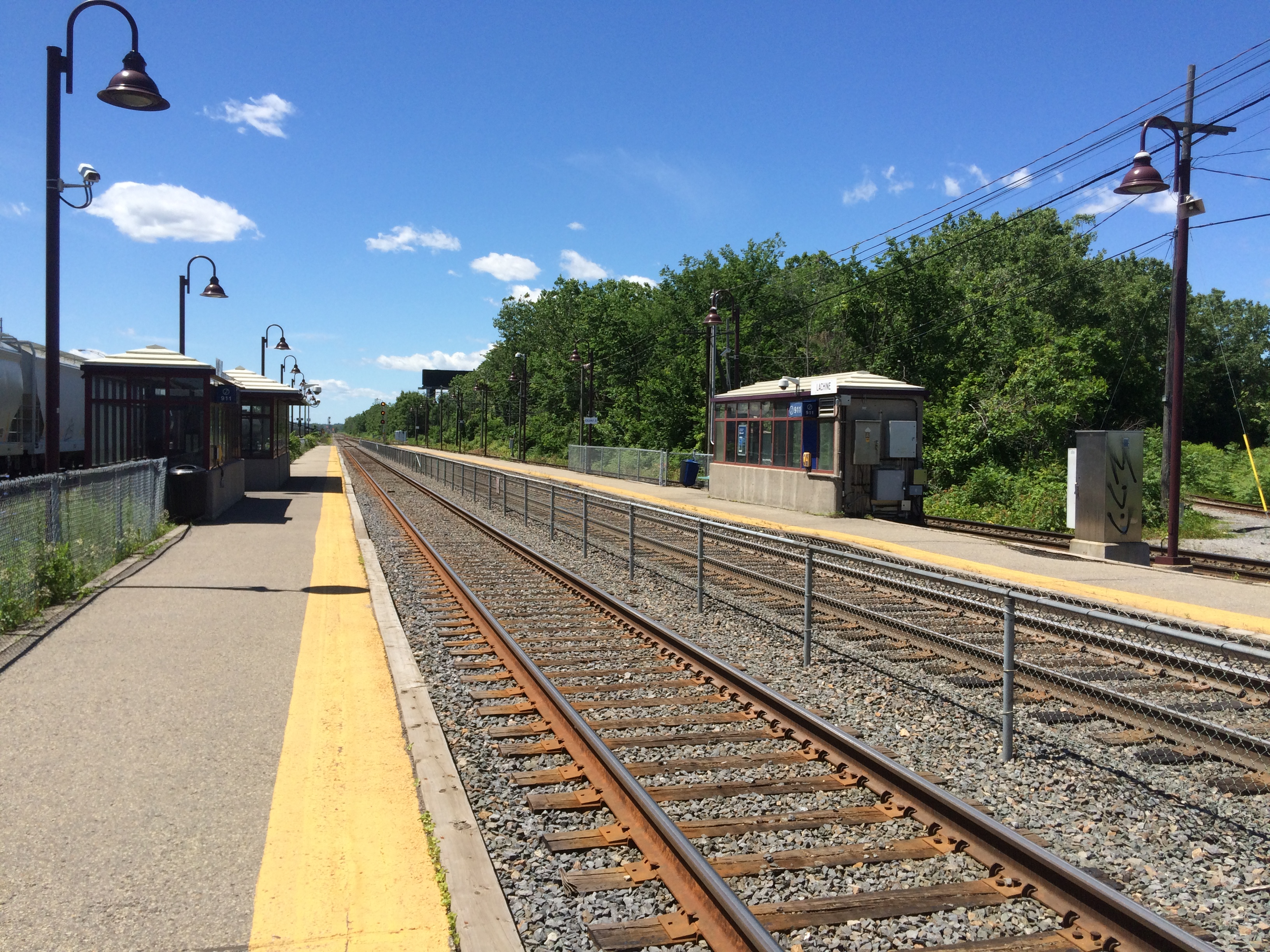

General information
- Location: 4800 Sir-George-Simpson Street; Lachine, Quebec H8T 1E6
- Coordinates: 45°26′55″N 73°42′40″W
- Operator: Exo
- Platforms: 2 side platforms
- Tracks: 2
- Connections: STM taxibus

Construction
- Parking: None
- Cycle facilities: 102 spaces

Other information
- Fare zone: ARTM: A
- Website: Lachine Station (RTM)

Passengers
- 2019: 353,400 (Exo)

Services
Preceding station	Exo	Following station
Dorval toward Hudson	Line 11 – Vaudreuil–Hudson	Montréal-Ouest toward Lucien-L'Allier
Location

Lachine station (French pronunciation: [laʃin]) is a commuter rail station operated by Exo in the borough of Lachine, Canada. It is part of the Vaudreuil–Hudson line. It has no connecting bus routes.

As of December 2024, on weekdays, all 13 inbound trains and 14 outbound trains on the line call at this station. On weekends, all trains (four on Saturday and three on Sunday in each direction) call here.

The station is located north of Autoroute 20 and has two side platforms; access between them is provided by a tunnel with headhouses on either side of the tracks, which crosses under the CN rails and highway to reach the station entrance located at the corner of 48e Avenue and Rue Sir-George-Simpson.

This station was opened as Grovehill station in 1961, and was renamed Lachine in 1989 after a previous station by that name, located to the east, was closed.

== Connecting taxibus routes ==
Société de transport de Montréal
No.	Route	Connects to	Service times / notes
287	Gare Lachine		Weekdays, peak only
