= Pincourt–Terrasse-Vaudreuil station =

Railway station in Quebec, Canada

Pincourt–Terrasse-Vaudreuil
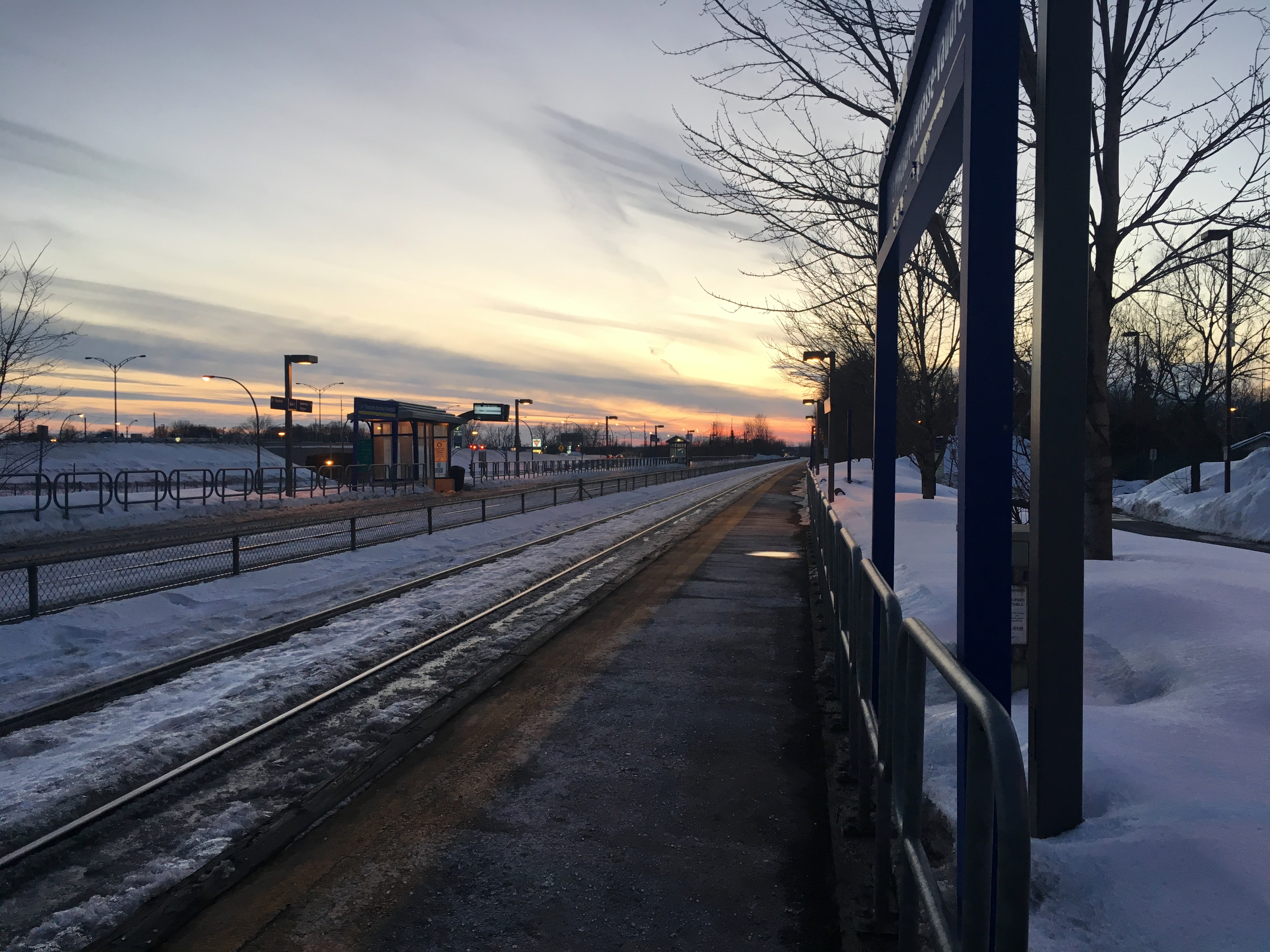

General information
- Location: 4, 4e Boulevard; Terrasse-Vaudreuil, Quebec J7V 5M5
- Coordinates: 45°23′13″N 73°59′39″W
- Operator: Exo
- Platforms: 2 side platforms
- Tracks: 2

Construction
- Parking: 227 Park-and-Ride, 2 Carpooling, and 2 Disabled spaces
- Cycle facilities: 26 spaces

Other information
- Fare zone: ARTM: C
- Website: Pincourt-Tessasse-Vaudreuil Station (RTM)

Passengers
- 2019: 256,400

Services
Preceding station	Exo	Following station
Dorion toward Hudson	Line 11 – Vaudreuil–Hudson	Île-Perrot toward Lucien-L'Allier
Location

Pincourt–Terrasse-Vaudreuil (French pronunciation: [pɛ̃kuʁ tɛʁas vodʁœj]) is a commuter rail station operated by Exo in Terrasse-Vaudreuil, Quebec, Canada. As of October 2020, 9 of 11 inbound trains and 11 of 12 outbound trains on the line call at this station; one train each way is short turned and one inbound train skips the stop. On weekends, all trains (four on Saturday and three on Sunday in each direction) call here.

The station is located at the corner of 3e Avenue and 5e Boulevard, a short distance from the Boulevard Cardinal-Léger exit of Autoroute 20. It has two side platforms connected by the 3e Avenue level crossing, and is equipped with shelters but no station building.
