= Île-Perrot station =

Railway station in Quebec, Canada

Île-Perrot
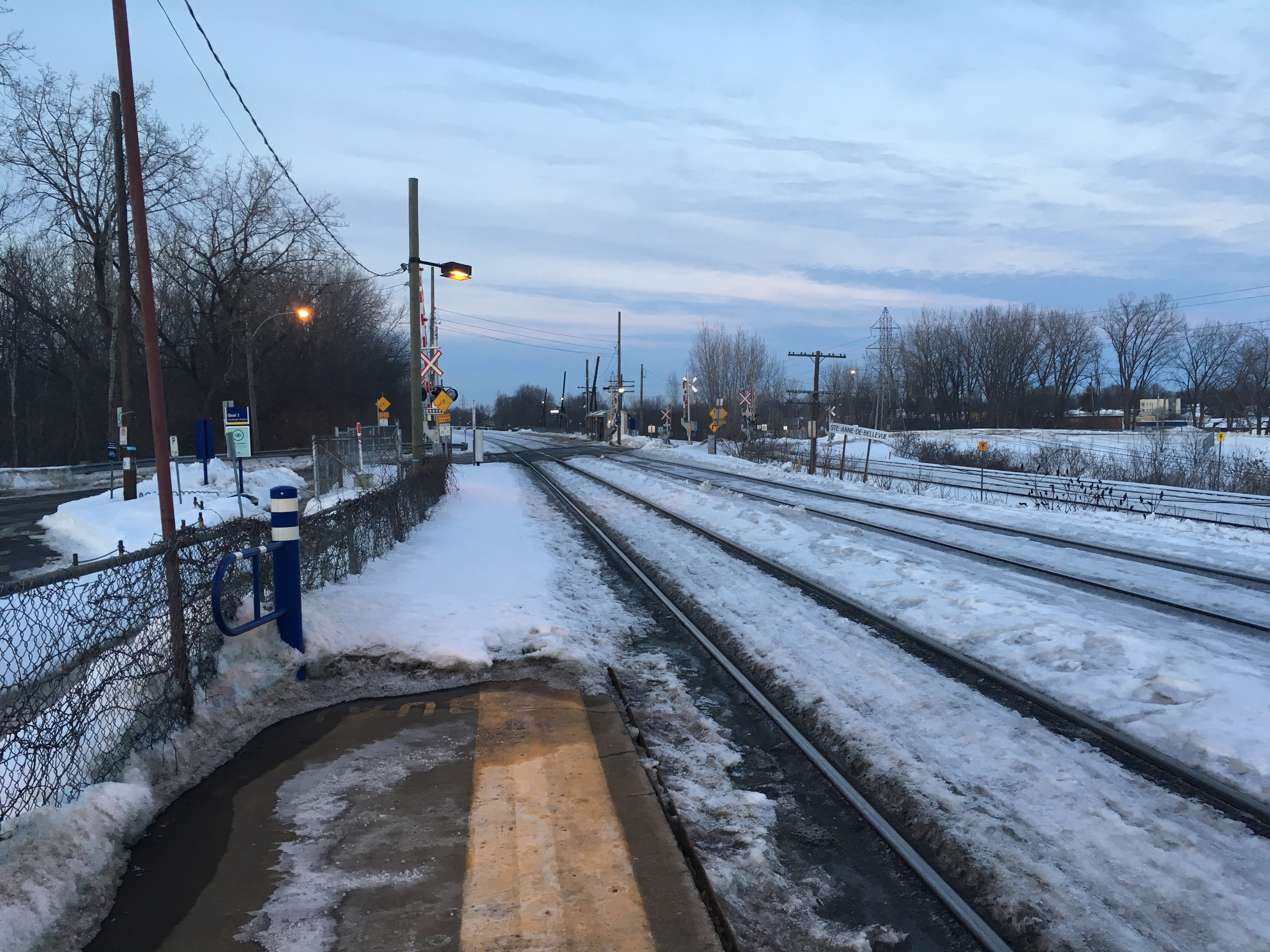
- Looking towards platform 1

General information
- Location: 10 Perrot North Boulevard; L'Île-Perrot, Quebec J7V 3J4
- Coordinates: 45°23′45″N 73°57′55″W
- Operator: Exo
- Platforms: 2 side platforms
- Tracks: 2
- Connections: Exo bus services

Construction
- Parking: 271 Park-and-Ride, 2 Carpooling, and 1 Disabled spaces
- Cycle facilities: 36 spaces

Other information
- Fare zone: ARTM: C
- Website: Ile-Perrot Station (RTM)

Passengers
- 2019: 280,900 (Exo)

Services
Preceding station	Exo	Following station
Pincourt–Terrasse-Vaudreuil toward Hudson	Line 11 – Vaudreuil–Hudson	Sainte-Anne-de-Bellevue toward Lucien-L'Allier
Location

Île-Perrot station (French pronunciation: [il pɛʁo]) is a commuter rail station operated by Exo in L'Île-Perrot, Quebec, Canada. It is served by the Vaudreuil–Hudson line.

As of October 2020, on weekdays, 9 of 11 inbound trains and 11 of 12 outbound trains on the line call at this station; one train each way is short turned and one inbound train skips the stop. On weekends, all trains (four on Saturday and three on Sunday in each direction) call here.

The station is located on Boulevard Perrot. Unusually, the station's two side platforms do not face each other but are located some 80 metres apart on either side of the Boulevard Perrot level crossing. The platforms are also unusually short, to the extent that passengers can only disembark from the rear two cars of their train. There is no station building, and only the inbound platform is equipped with a single shelter.

== Connecting bus routes ==
Exo La Presqu'Île sector
No.	Route	Connects to	Service times / notes	Terminus wing and gate
210	Gare Île-Perrot - Pointe-aux-Renards		Daily	1
211	Gare Île-Perrot - Pointe-du-Moulin		Weekdays only	2
212	Gare Île-Perrot - Perrot		Weekdays only	5
591	Gare Dorion - Île Perrot - REM	Dorion; Anse-à-l'Orme	Weekdays only	4
593	Notre-Dame-de-l'Île-Perrot - Terminus Macdonald	Terminus Macdonald	Weekdays only	4
793	Gare Dorion - Île Perrot - Terminus Macdonald	Dorion; Terminus Macdonald	Weekdays only	3
