= A. M. Pattison =

Canadian artist (1880–1957)

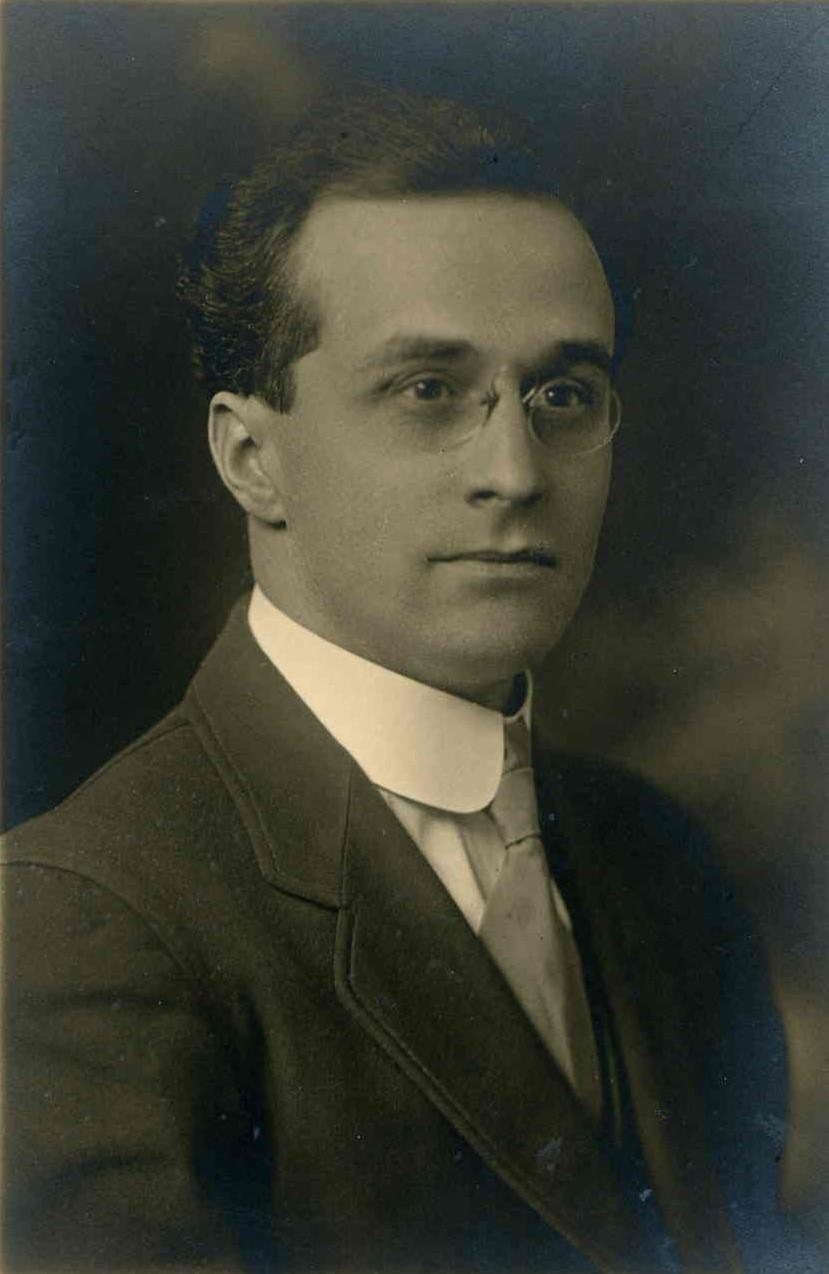
- Born: 9 April 1880; Saint-Georges-de-Clarenceville, Quebec
- Died: 26 November 1957 (aged 77); Hudson, Quebec
- Occupation: artist

Albert Mead "Pat" Pattison (9 April 1880 – 26 November 1957) was a Quebec-based Canadian artist who worked as a commercial artist and architect. He signed his main works of art A.M. Pattison; and smaller pieces, such as illustrations, A.M.P.

== Early life ==
Born in Saint-Georges-de-Clarenceville, Quebec, Pattison was the son of William Mead Pattison, the Collector of Customs at Clarenceville, and Charlotte Krans.

== Education ==
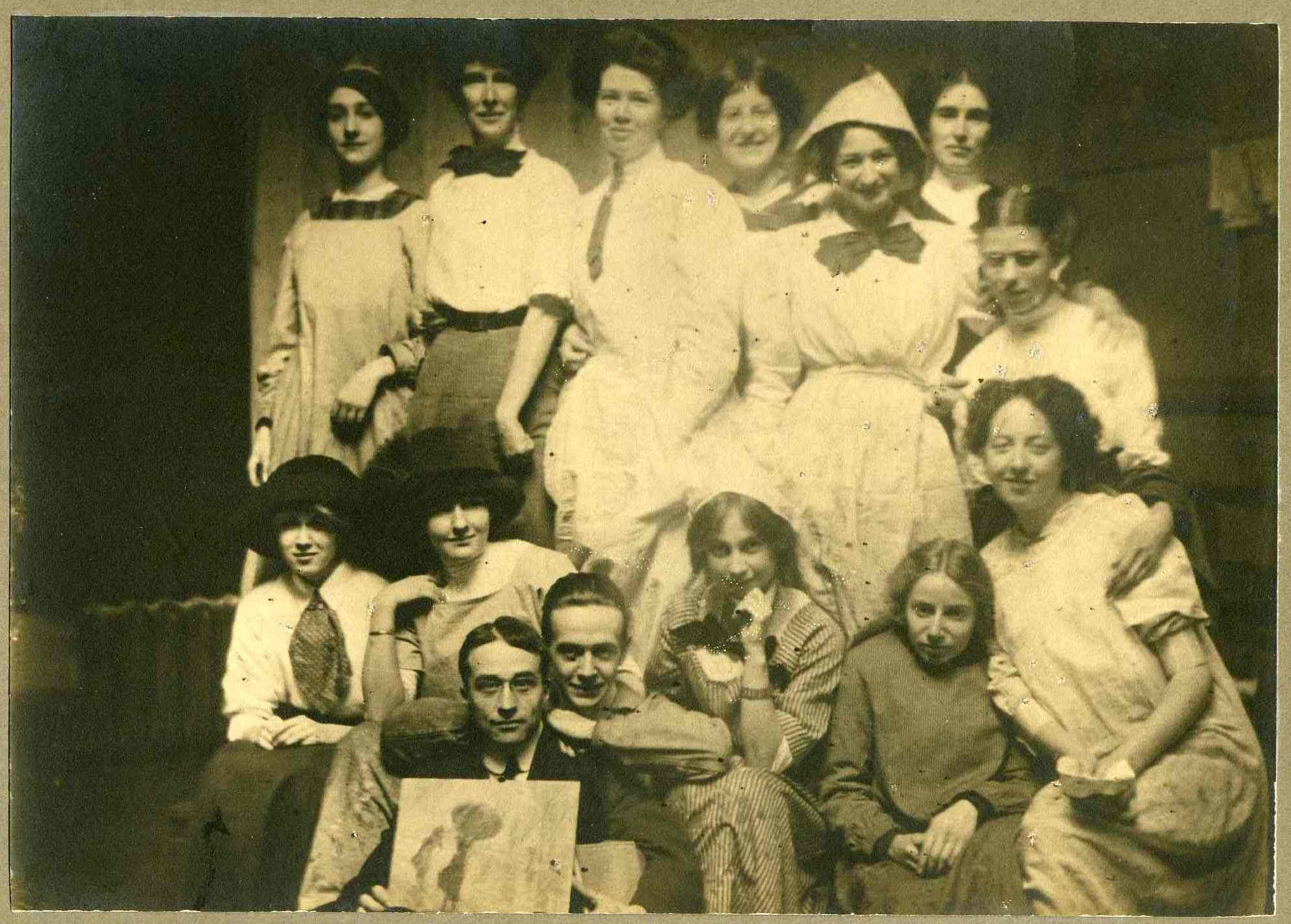
Photo of Canadian artist A.M. Pattison (seated bottom left, holding artwork) and classmates at the Art Association of Montreal art school on January 5, 1912.

Pattison received his early education at Clarenceville Academy. From 1899 to 1903, he attended McGill University in Montreal, Quebec, where he studied art and architecture.

From 1908 to 1912, he attended the art school of the Art Association of Montreal, which in 1949 was renamed the Montreal Museum of Fine Arts (MMFA), where he studied under prominent Canadian artists William Brymner and Maurice Cullen. Several of his classmates later became members of the Beaver Hall Group of painters, including Emily Coonan, Edwin Holgate, John Young Johnstone, Sarah Robertson, Adrien Hébert, Mabel May, Lilias Torrance Newton, Prudence Heward and Sybil Robertson. In 1911, both Pattison and Mabel May were awarded an Art Association Scholarship for their Life Class drawing. Pattison's winning life drawing is in the MMFA's archive and can be viewed on the Canadian Heritage Information Network website.

== Later life ==
Pattison initially worked as a draughtsman for the Montreal architecture firm Hutchison, Wood and Miller before joining the Montreal Gazette in 1915 as a commercial artist.

A Dictionary of Canadian Artists states that Pattison "worked part time as an illustrator for the Montreal Gazette. He would only work part time so that he could devote the remainder of his attention to his paintings, which he exhibited at The Montreal Museum of Fine Arts several times."

Pattison produced works in many mediums, including watercolor, etching and oil painting. The majority of his work depicts scenes of everyday life in Montreal and the nearby Quebec countryside, as well as Montreal cityscapes.

Evelyn de Rostaing McMann's book Montreal Museum of Fine Arts, formerly Art Association of Montreal – Spring Exhibitions 1880-1970 records that Pattison exhibited a total of 34 works in 16 of these annual exhibitions from the years 1911 to 1937. McMann's book Royal Canadian Academy of Arts/Académie royale des arts du Canada: exhibitions and members, 1880-1979 states that he exhibited a total of six works in three Royal Canadian Academy of Arts exhibitions in 1913, 1924 and 1929.

Pattison travelled to England and France in 1924, and two watercolors from that trip – Charing Cross Bridge, London and Bastille Day, Rouen – were exhibited at the Royal Canadian Academy's exhibition that same year. In his review of the two works in the 10 March 1925 edition of the Paris-based arts and letters magazine Revue du Vrai et du Beau, French art critic Comte Chabrier commented on "the strength of the drawing, the simplicity and good taste of their composition, precision, and vividness of color" and described Pattison as "a watercolorist endowed with truly original temperament".

Several of Pattison's works were published as part of the Canadian Artists Series of Christmas cards, which Library and Archives Canada says were produced circa 1927 to 1931.

Pattison died in Hudson, Quebec, on 26 November 1957 at the age of 77 after suffering a stroke a few months earlier.

His work is included in the collections of the MMFA, Library and Archives Canada and the Art Gallery of Greater Victoria.

== Selected works ==
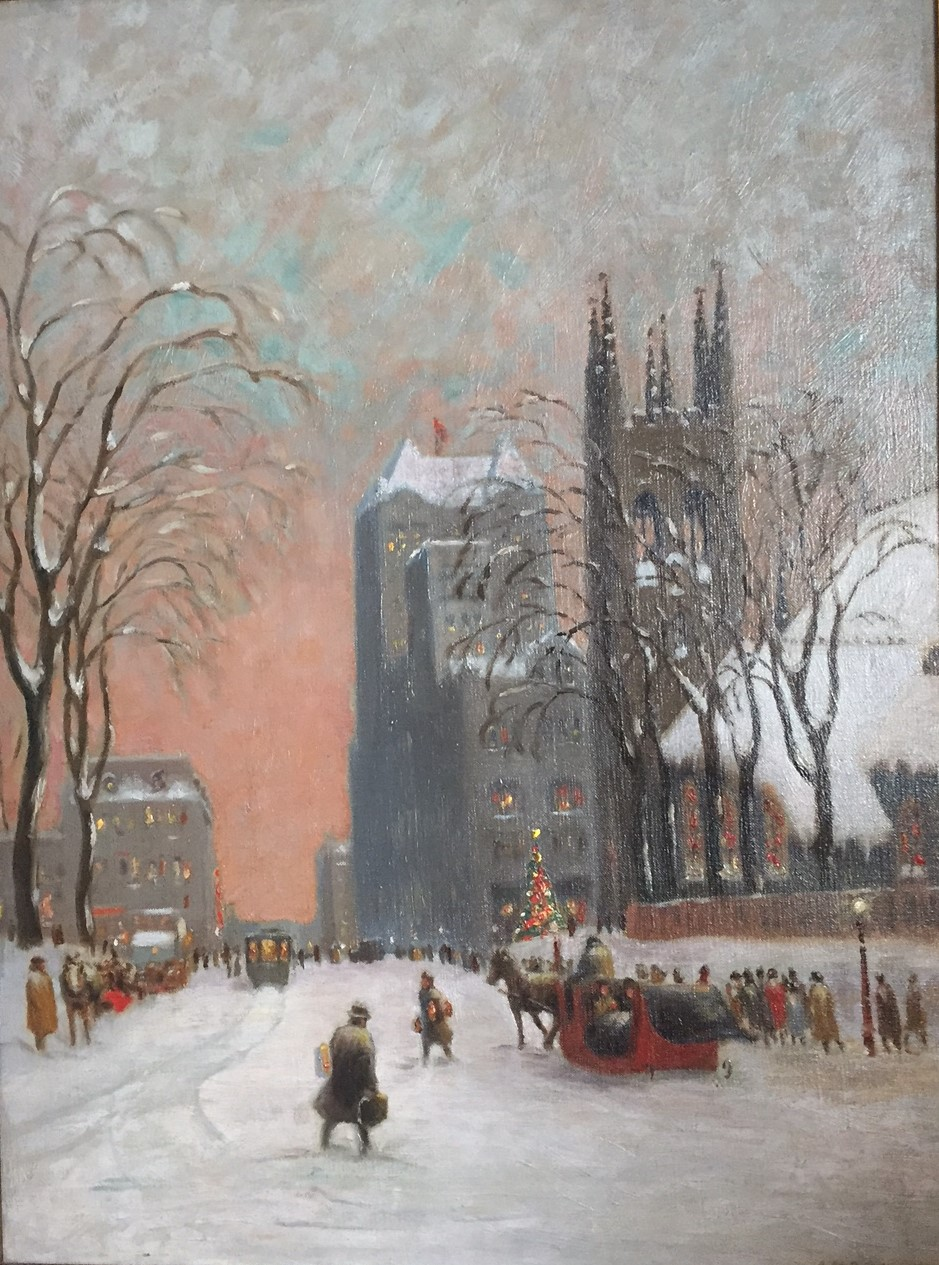
Windsor Street, Montreal, 1931. Oil painting by A.M. Pattison. Private Collection.

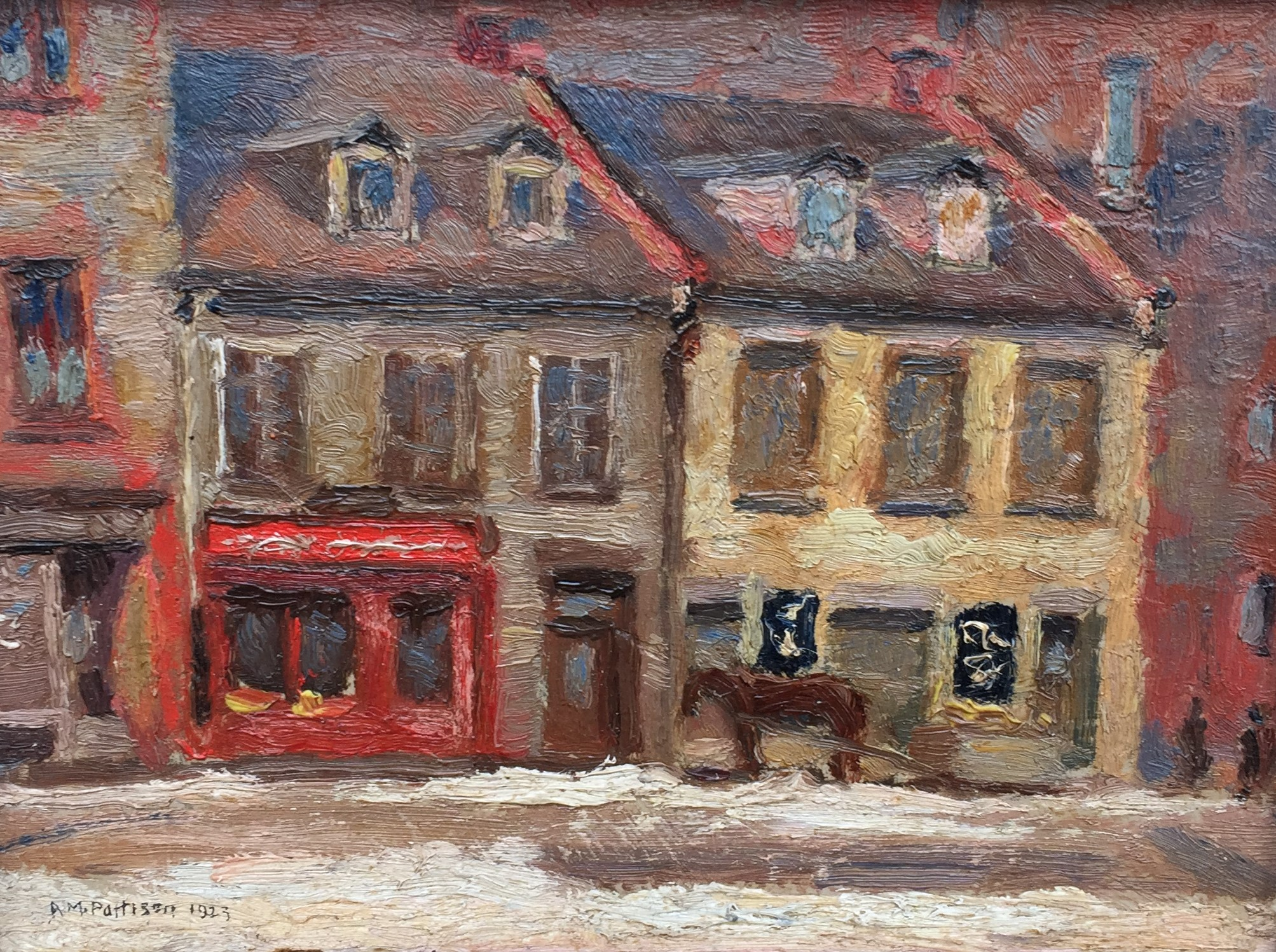
Old Montreal, 1923. Oil painting by A.M. Pattison. Private Collection.

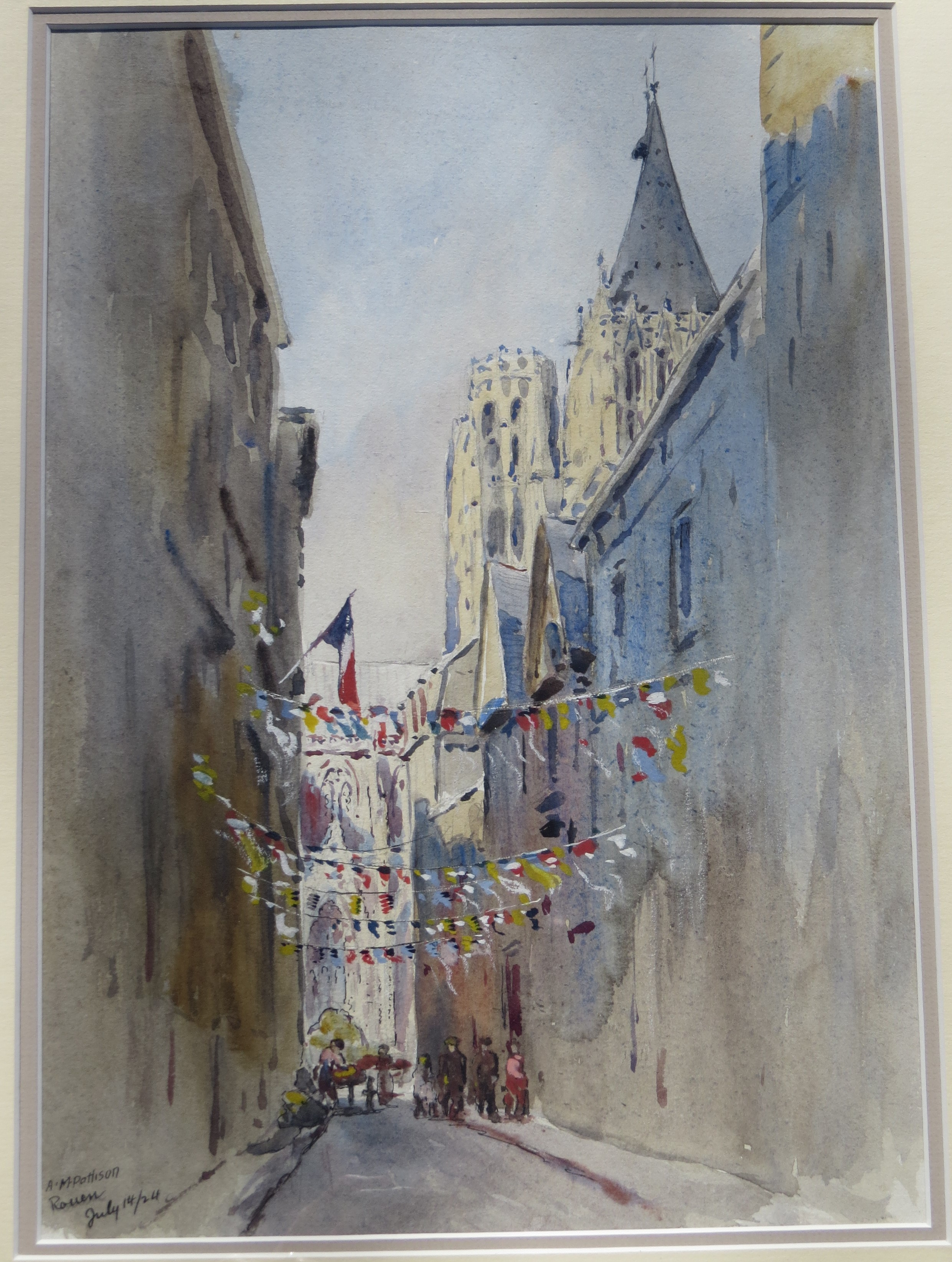
Bastille Day, Rouen, France, July 14, 1924. Watercolor by A.M. Pattison. Private Collection.

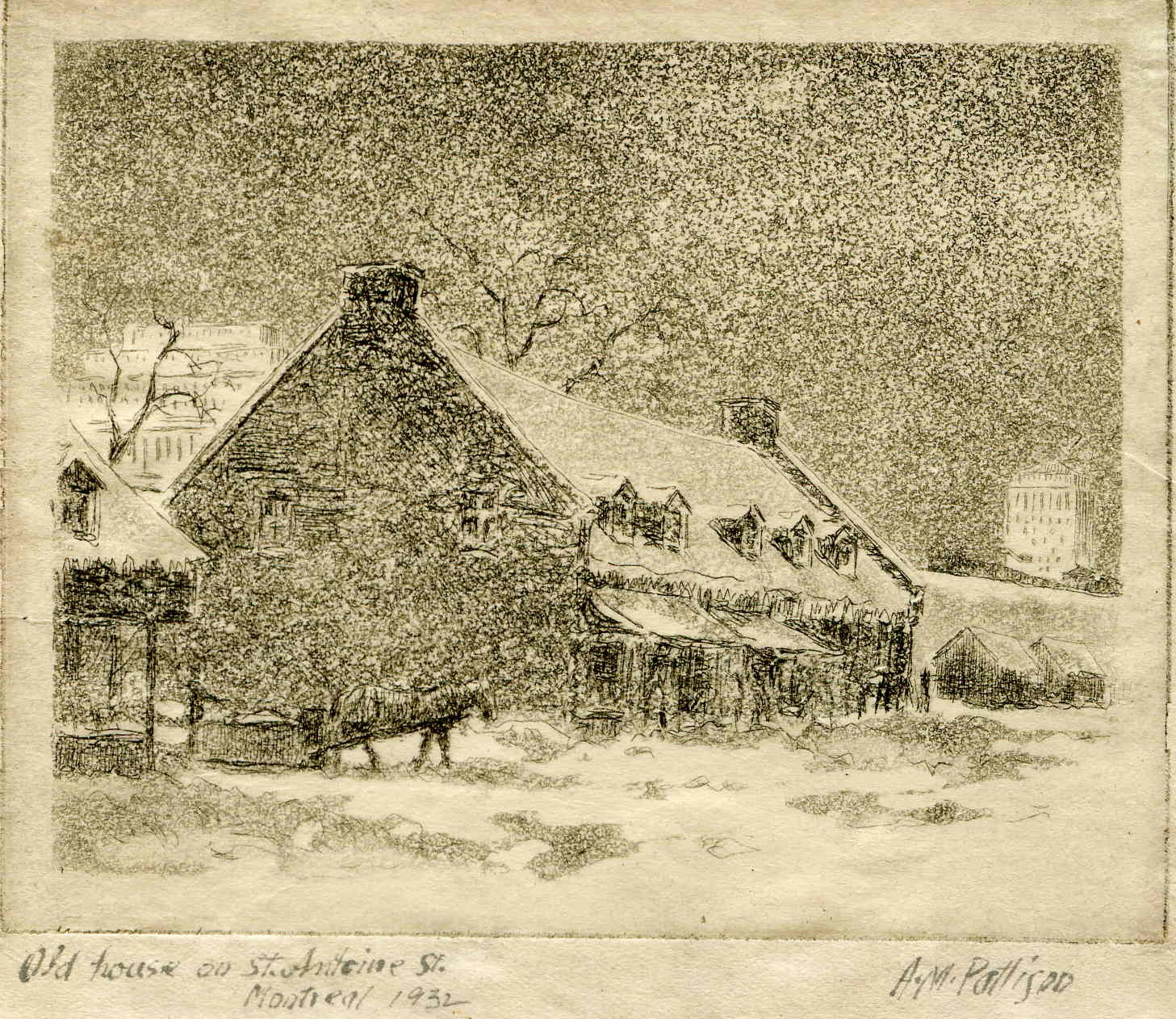
Old house on St. Antoine Street, Montreal, 1932. Etching by A.M. Pattison. Private Collection.

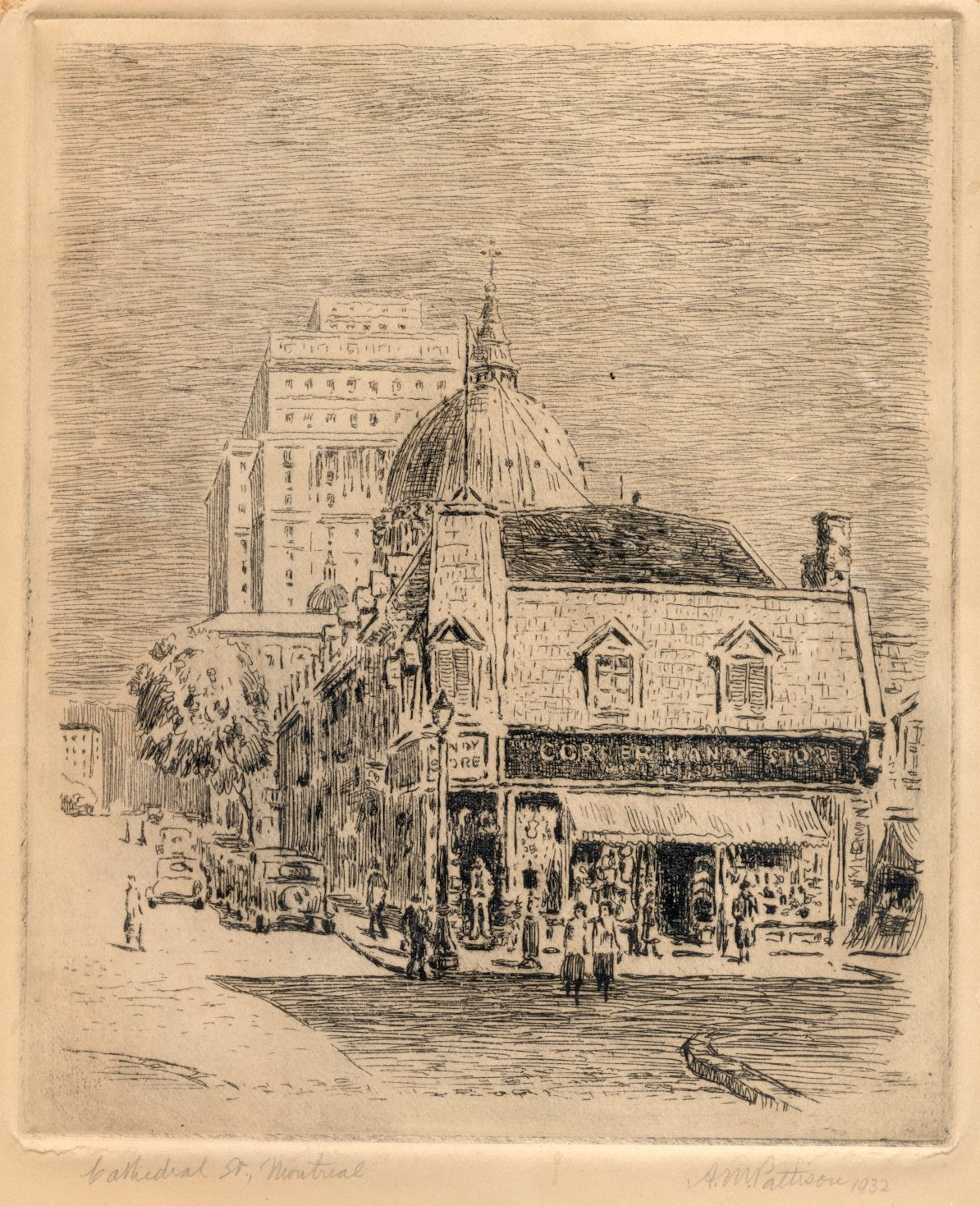
Corner Handy Store, Cathedral Street, Montreal, 1932. Etching by A.M. Pattison. Private Collection.

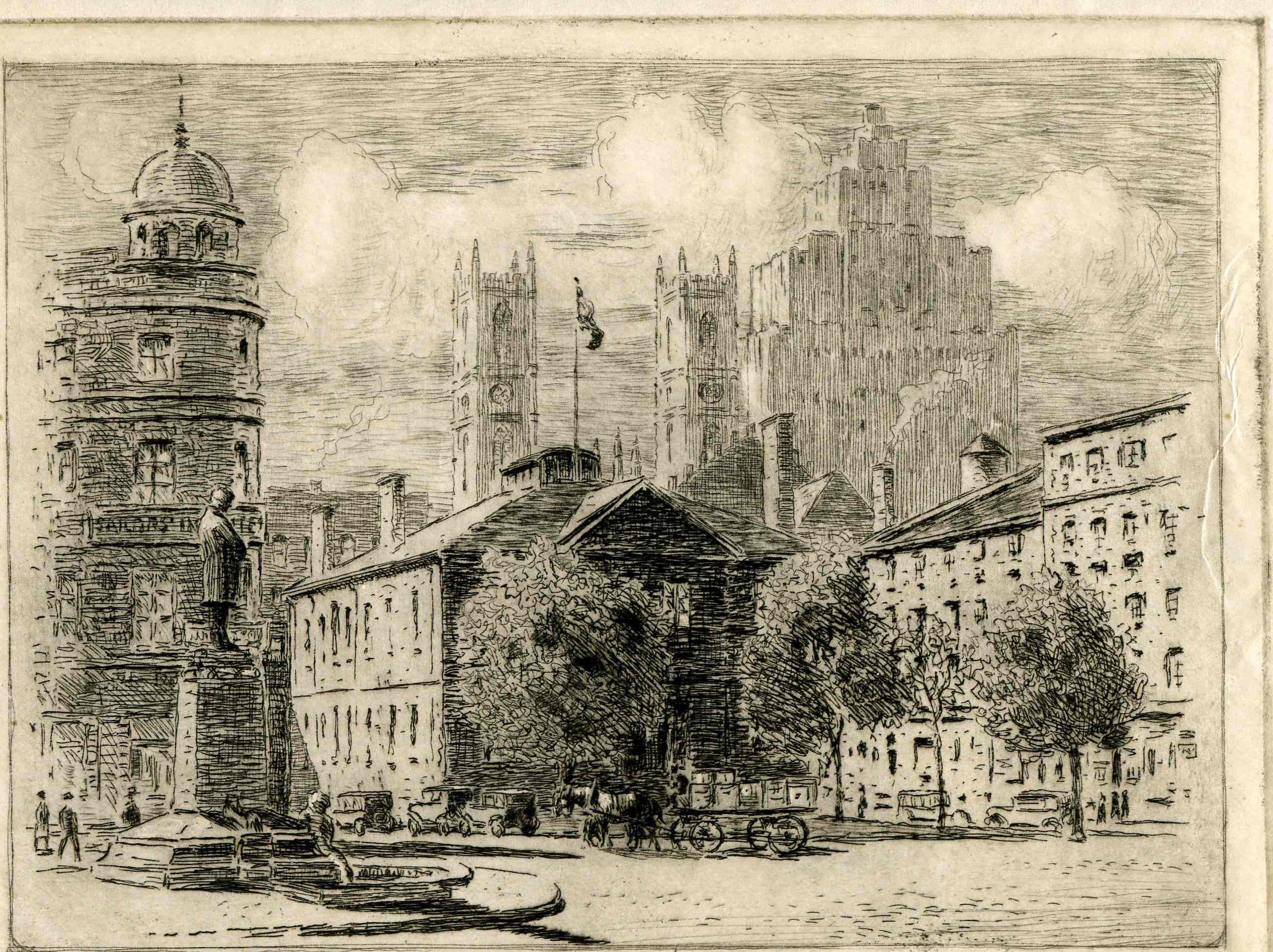
Place d'Youville, Montreal. Undated. Etching by A.M. Pattison. Private Collection.

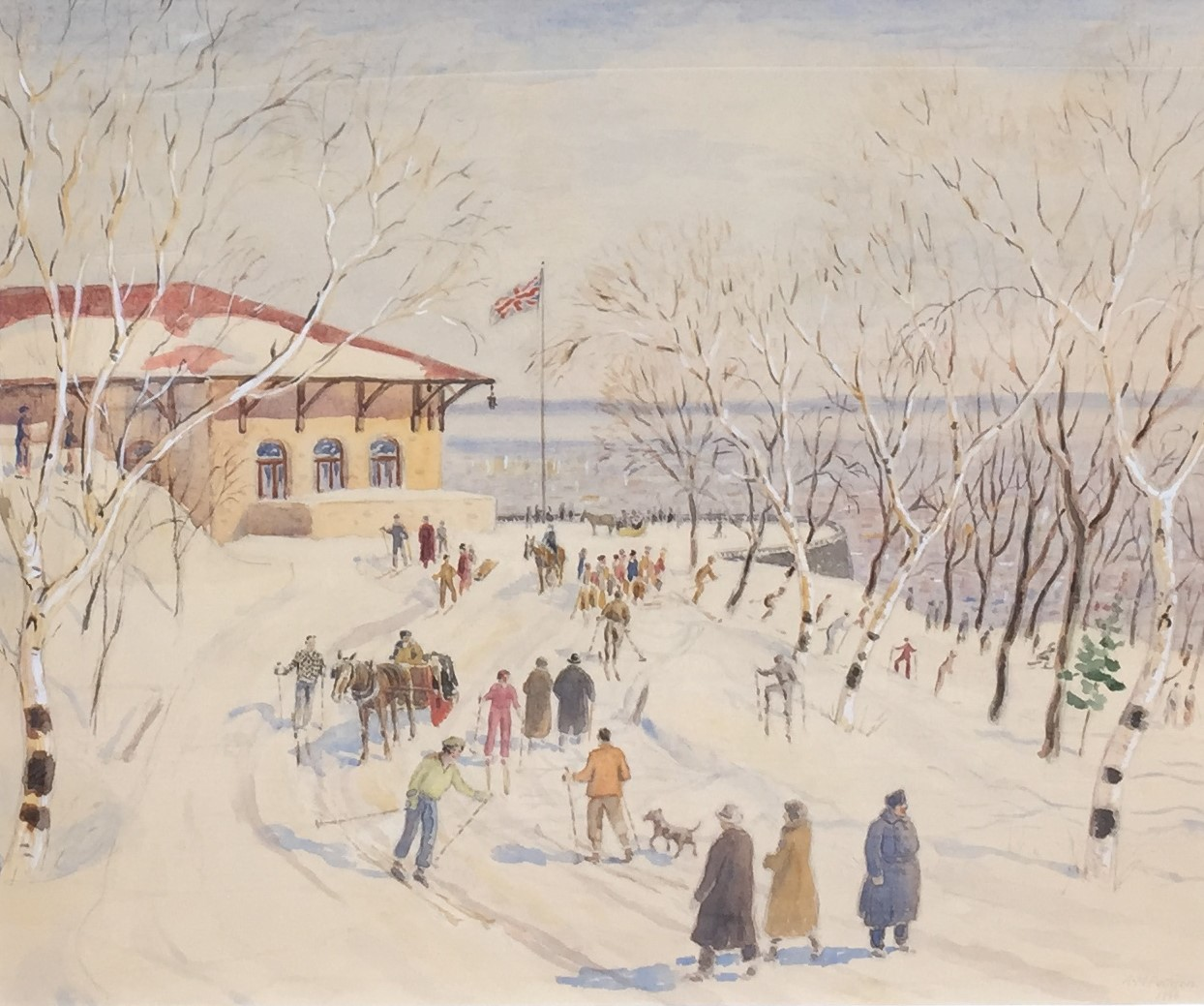
Mount Royal, Montreal, 1936. Watercolor by A.M. Pattison. Private Collection.
