= Anse-à-l'Orme station =

REM station in Saint-anne-de-bellevue, Quebec, Canada

Anse-à-l'Orme
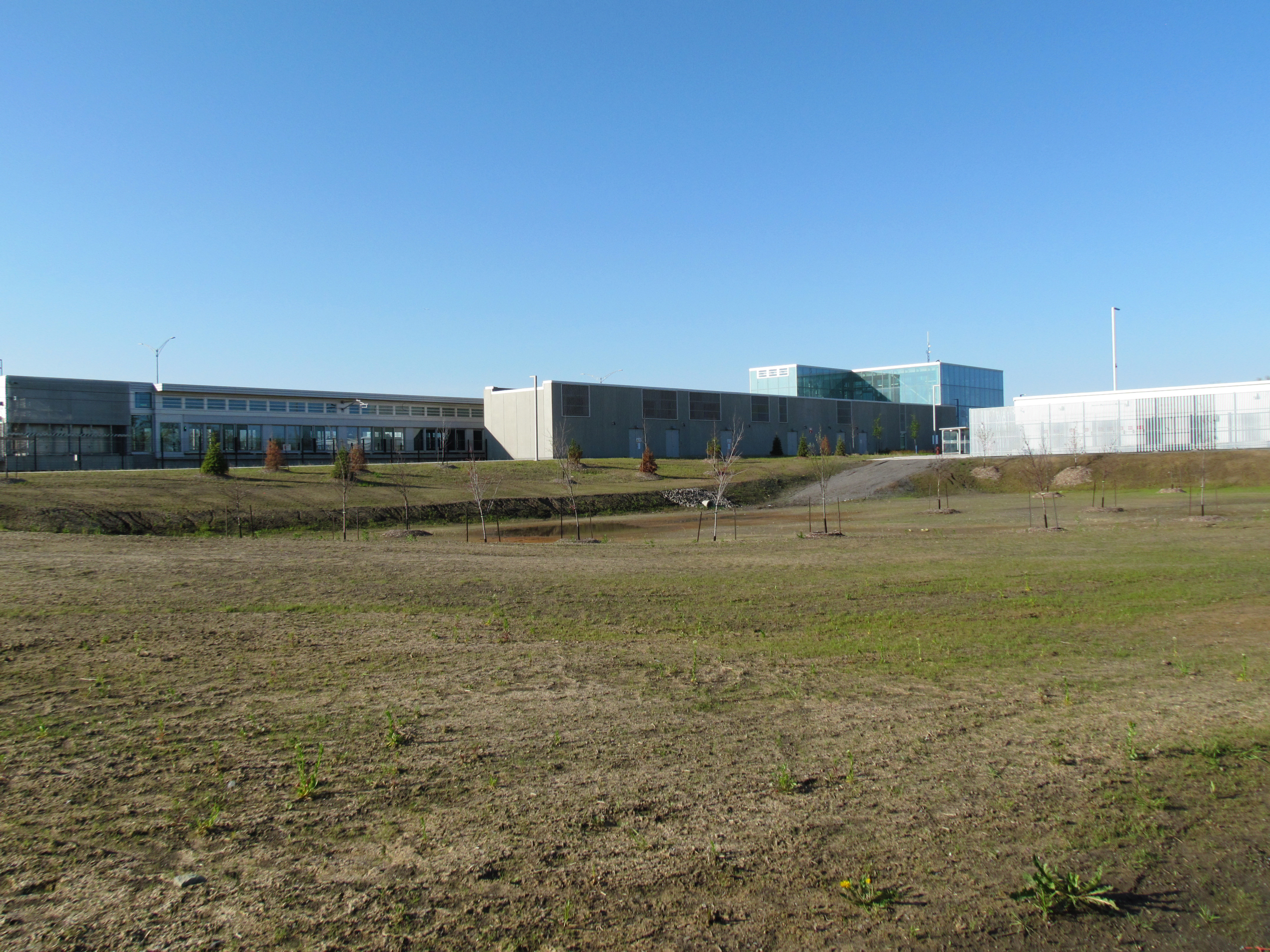
- Anse-à-l'Orme station, seen from the street

General information
- Location: Sainte-Marie Road, Sainte-Anne-de-Bellevue, Quebec; Canada
- Coordinates: 45.429740°N 73.917502°W
- Operator: Pulsar (AtkinsRéalis and Alstom)
- Platforms: 1 island platform
- Tracks: 2
- Connections: STM bus; STM taxibus; Exo bus services

Construction
- Structure type: At-grade
- Parking: : 216 spaces
- Accessible: Yes

Other information
- Station code: SAB
- Fare zone: ARTM: A
- Website: Anse-à-l'Orme (REM)

History
- Opened: 18 May 2026; 4 months ago

Services
| Preceding station | REM | Following station |
|---|---|---|
| Terminus | Réseau express métropolitain | Kirkland toward Brossard |
Track layout
Location

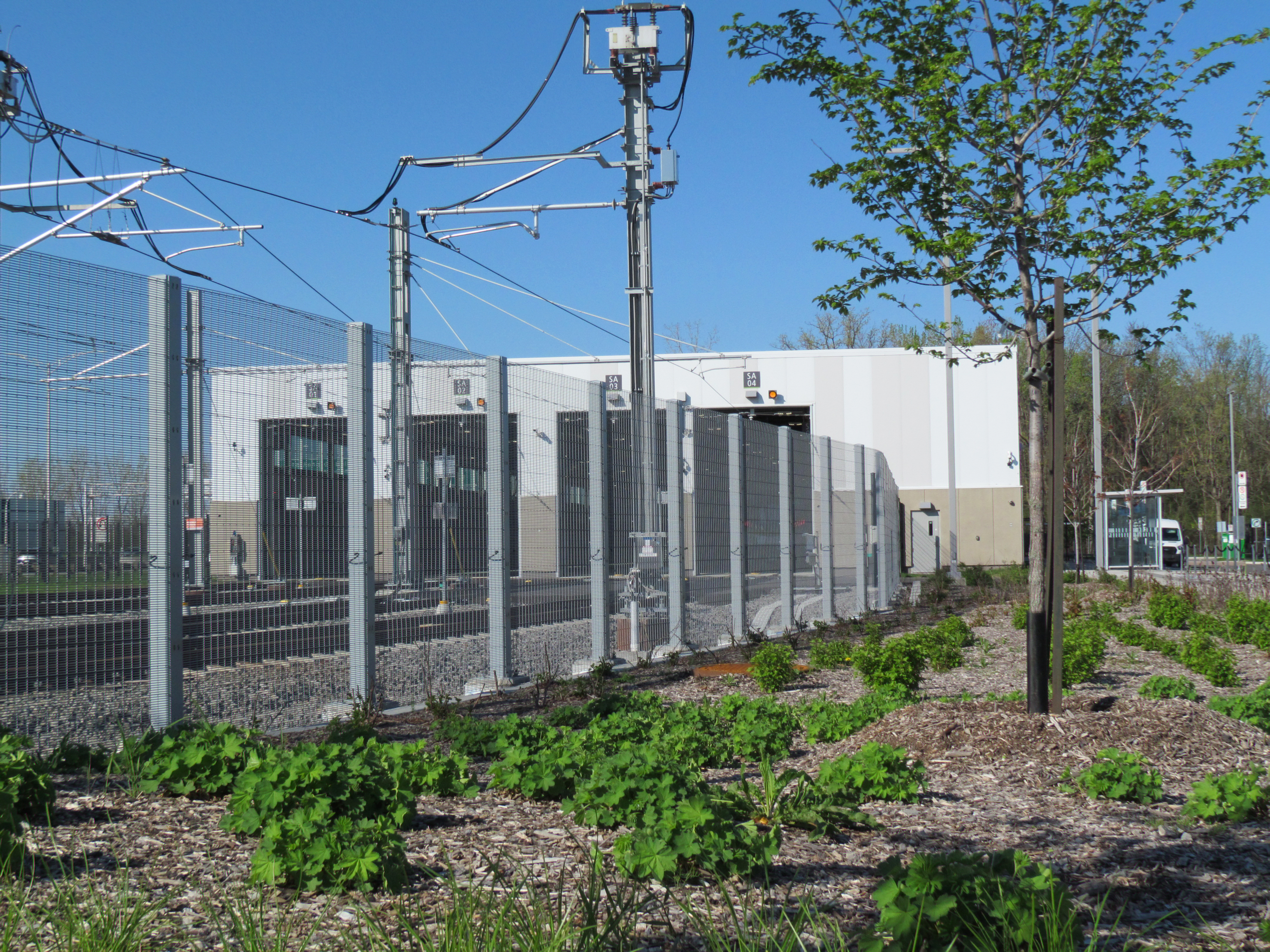
Anse-à-l'Orme depot

Anse-à-l'Orme (pronounced [ɑ̃salɔʁm]; known as Sainte-Anne-de-Bellevue during development) is a Réseau express métropolitain (REM) station in the city of Sainte-Anne-de-Bellevue, Quebec, Canada. It is operated by CDPQ Infra; it serves as the terminal station of the Anse-à-l'Orme branch of the REM, which opened on 18 May 2026. West of the station is a 4-track depot for overnight storage of trains.

It is located near two important educational institutions, John Abbott College and the Macdonald Campus of McGill University, which will be connected via bus. It is also located near L'Anse-à-l'Orme Nature Park.

== Connecting bus routes ==
Société de transport de Montréal
| No. | Route | Connects to | Service times / notes | Terminus wing and gate |
|---|---|---|---|---|
| 68 | Pierrefonds | Pierrefonds-Roxboro | Daily | 03 |
| 210 | John Abbott | | Weekdays only | 07 |
| 212 | Sainte-Anne | Sainte-Anne-de-Bellevue | Daily | 06 |
| 222 | Senneville | | Weekdays, peak only | 04 |
| 223 | Parc industriel Baie-D'Urfé | Baie-D'Urfé | Weekdays, peak only | 04 |
| 229 | Transcanadienne / Brunswick | Kirkland; Fairview-Pointe-Claire | Weekdays only | 05 |
| 281 | Senneville / Sainte-Anne-de-Bellevue | Sainte-Anne-de-Bellevue | Taxibus | Taxi |
| 294 | Parc industriel Baie-D'Urfé | Baie-D'Urfé | Taxibus Weekends & Holidays only | Taxi |
| 521 | REM Anse-à-l'Orme / Kirkland / Côte-Vertu | Kirkland; Côte-Vertu | Used in case of a service disruption on the REM | 11 |
| 523 | REM Anse-à-l'Orme / Kirkland / Fairview-Pointe-Claire | Kirkland; Fairview-Pointe-Claire | Used in case of a service disruption on the REM | 11 |
| 524 | REM Anse-à-l'Orme / Kirkland / Fairview-Pointe-Claire / Des Sources / Bois-Franc | Kirkland; Fairview-Pointe-Claire; Des Sources; Bois-Franc | Used in case of a service disruption on the REM | 11 |
| 525 | REM Anse-à-l'Orme / Kirkland / Fairview-Pointe-Claire / Des Sources / Côte-Vertu | Kirkland; Fairview-Pointe-Claire; Des Sources; Côte-Vertu | Used in case of a service disruption on the REM | 11 |
| TA ♿︎ | STM Transport adapté | | | Taxi |
Exo La Presqu'Île sector
| No. | Route | Connects to | Service times / notes | Terminus wing and gate |
| 490 | Terminus Vaudreuil – Bourget – REM | Vaudreuil | Weekdays only | 08 |
| 491 | Terminus Vaudreuil – REM | Vaudreuil | Daily | 09 |
| 591 | Gare Dorion – Île Perrot – REM | Dorion; Île-Perrot | Weekdays only | 02 |
| 790 | Dorion – Île Perrot – REM | | Weekends only | 10 |
Exo Transport adapté
| No. | Route | Connects to | Service times / notes | Terminus wing and gate |
| TA ♿︎ | Exo Transport adapté | | | Taxi |
