= Hudson, Quebec =

Hudson
- City

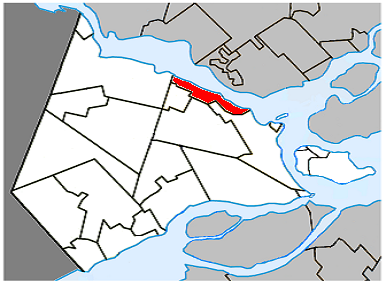
- Location within Vaudreuil-Soulanges RCM

- Location in southern Quebec
- Coordinates: 45°27′N 74°09′W
- Country: Canada
- Province: Quebec
- Region: Montérégie
- RCM: Vaudreuil-Soulanges
- Constituted: June 7, 1969

Government
  - Mayor: Chloe Hutchison
  - Federal riding: Vaudreuil
  - Prov. riding: Soulanges

Area
  - Total: 36.50 km^{2} (14.09 sq mi)
  - Land: 21.87 km^{2} (8.44 sq mi)

Population (2016)
  - Total: 5,157
  - Density: 237.1/km^{2} (614/sq mi)
  - Pop 2011-2016: ▲0.4%
  - Dwellings: 2,373
- Time zone: UTC−5 (EST)
  - Summer (DST): UTC−4 (EDT)
- Postal code(s): J0P
- Area codes: 450 and 579
- Highways A-40: R-201; R-342
- Website: www.ville.hudson.qc.ca

Hudson is an off-island suburb of Montreal, with a population of 5,411 as of 2021. It is located on the south-west bank of the lower Ottawa River, in Vaudreuil-Soulanges Regional County Municipality. Situated about 60 kilometres (37 mi) west of downtown Montreal, many residents commute to work on the Island of Montreal.

Hudson is a municipality within Greater Montreal. An informal rural agglomeration since the early part of the 19th century, the Town of Hudson was formally created in June 1969 by merging the villages of Hudson, Hudson Heights and Como. A relatively wealthy town, Hudson is known for its large, turn-of-the century houses, many of which border the Lake of Two Mountains. A ferry from Hudson takes cars across the lake (a widening of the Ottawa River) to the village of Oka.

Hudson has been compared to culturally and demographically similar Quebec towns such as the Eastern Townships villages of North Hatley and Brome Lake as well as nearby Senneville. All four municipalities border a body of water (used extensively for recreation year-round) and include a blend of French and English residents.

== Geography ==
Hudson is near the edge of suburban Montreal to the east, but also surrounded by substantial farming and forest areas to the west. Large lot sizes, enforced by town bylaws, contribute to the relatively large number of trees in the residential areas. Zoning, infrastructure and building development are occasionally controversial subjects, such as when town residents voted against permitting Gheorghe Zamfir to build a concert hall near the edge of town in the 1980s. In 2001, the town won a victory in Canada's Supreme Court, upholding its by-law 207, which bans pesticide use on public and private property for cosmetic (purely aesthetic) purposes.

The municipal territory of Hudson is delimited as follows:

- 2.1 kilometres (1.3 mi) with the limit of Saint-Placide;
- 11.4 kilometres (7.1 mi) with the limit of Oka;
- 16.2 kilometres (10.1 mi) with the limit of Vaudreuil-Dorion;
- 3.6 kilometres (2.2 mi) with the limit of Rigaud.

Thus, the northern limit of Hudson stretches over 13.5 kilometres (8.4 mi) in the middle of Lac-des-Deux-Montagnes, i.e. between Pointe Graham (west side) facing Saint-Placide and Pointe Cavagnal (side East) facing Oka. This shoreline strip of land is of a width varying between 2.3 kilometres (1.4 mi) (to the east) up to a maximum of 3.4 kilometres (2.1 mi) to the west.

=== Physical environment ===
The bedrock under Hudson is Cambrian Period sandstone. This is overlain by marine clay or stony sandy loam glacial till. On the surface are sands which were deposited by air or water. Most of Hudson is built on the Ste-Sophie loamy fine sand, which is well drained and drought-prone despite its clay base; undisturbed areas have classic podzol development. Several blocks away from the river the sands become deeper, coarser and even more xeric; they are mapped as Upland sand which is also a podzol.

== History ==
The local post office opened in 1841, originally named Pointe-à-Cavagnol in honour of Pierre de Rigaud de Vaudreuil de Cavagnial. In 1845, a glass factory was established there by George Matthews, whose wife was called Elisa Hudson. Her name was adopted by the post office in 1865.

In 1877, the Village Municipality of Como was formed when it separated from Vaudreuil. This village was named after Lake Como in Italy due to its scenic location on Lake of Two Mountains. It was renamed to Hudson in 1921.

4 years later, in 1925, the new Village Municipality of McNaughton was split off from Hudson. The following year, Hudson was renamed to Hudson Heights, and McNaughton took the name Hudson.

In June 1969, the Town of Hudson was formed by amalgamating the village municipalities of Hudson, Hudson Heights, and Como (which was originally formed as Como-Est in 1918).

In April 2023, 2898 Hudson residents lost power when an historic ice storm swept through southern Quebec.

=== Pesticide ban ===
The town gained notoriety in 1991 by becoming the first in Quebec, Canada to ban several forms of lawn and garden pesticides used to kill insects and weeds. The town was sued by two pesticide companies and on June 28, 2001, the Supreme Court of Canada ruled in the town's favour. The Hudson example spurred many other municipalities and provinces in Canada to enact similar bans of pesticides. The Hudson case is the subject of a 2009 American documentary movie titled A Chemical Reaction by filmmaker Brett Plymale.

== Demographics ==
Historical Census Data - Hudson, Quebec
| Year | Pop. | ±% |
|---|---|---|
| 1976 | 4,480 | — |
| 1981 | 4,414 | −1.5% |
| 1986 | 4,426 | +0.3% |
| 1991 | 4,829 | +9.1% |
| 1996 | 4,796 | −0.7% |
| 2001 | 4,796 | +0.0% |
| 2006 | 5,088 | +6.1% |
| 2011 | 5,135 | +0.9% |
| 2016 | 5,157 | +0.4% |
Source: Statistics Canada

In the 2021 Census of Population conducted by Statistics Canada, Hudson had a population of 5,411 living in 2,338 of its 2,447 total private dwellings, a change of 4.9% from its 2016 population of 5,157. With a land area of 21.79 km^{2} (8.41 sq mi), it had a population density of 248.3/km^{2} (643.2/sq mi) in 2021.

Canada census – Hudson community profile

| | 2021 | 2016 | 2011 |
| Population | 5,411 (+4.9% from 2016) | 5,157 (0.4% from 2011) | 5,135 (+0.9% from 2006) |
| Land area | 21.79 km^{2} (8.41 sq mi) | 21.87 km^{2} (8.44 sq mi) | 21.90 km^{2} (8.46 sq mi) |
| Population density | 248.4/km^{2} (643/sq mi) | 237.1/km^{2} (614/sq mi) | 234.5/km^{2} (607/sq mi) |
| Median age | 54.0 (M: 53.6, F: 54.4) | 52.7 (M: 52.3, F: 53.1) | 49.4 (M: 48.6, F: 50.0) |
| Private dwellings | 2,447 (total) 2,338 (occupied) | 2,373 (total) | 2,229 (total) |
| Median household income | $101,000 | $85,120 | $79,186 |

References: 2021 2016 2011

Unlike the surrounding mainly French-speaking municipalities, Hudson has a predominantly English-speaking population (65% according to the 2011 Census), although many residents speak both languages.

Canada Census Mother Tongue - Hudson, Quebec
| Census | Total | French | | | English | | | French & English | | | Other | | |
| Year | Responses | Count | Trend | Pop % | Count | Trend | Pop % | Count | Trend | Pop % | Count | Trend | Pop % |
| 2011 | 5,115 | 1,175 | ▲6.8% | 22.97% | 3,375 | ▲0.3% | 65.98% | 120 | 0.0% | 2.35% | 445 | ▼11.0% | 8.70% |
| 2006 | 5,085 | 1,100 | ▼6.4% | 21.63% | 3,365 | ▲8.2% | 66.18% | 120 | ▲9.1% | 2.36% | 500 | ▲26.6% | 9.83% |
| 2001 | 4,790 | 1,175 | ▲16.3% | 24.53% | 3,110 | ▼8.5% | 64.93% | 110 | ▲144.4% | 2.30% | 395 | ▲25.4% | 8.25% |
| 1996 | 4,770 | 1,010 | n/a | 21.17% | 3,400 | n/a | 71.28% | 45 | n/a | 0.94% | 315 | n/a | 6.60% |

Ethnic origin (2006)
| Ethnic origin | Population | Percentage (%) |
|---|---|---|
| English | 1,465 | 35% |
| Canadian | 1,240 | 29% |
| Scottish | 945 | 22% |
| French | 925 | 22% |
| Irish | 835 | 20% |
| German | 455 | 11% |
| British Isles, n.i.e. | 185 | 4% |
| Polish | 175 | 4% |
| Italian | 150 | 4% |
| Ukrainian | 135 | 3% |

== Events and tourist attractions ==
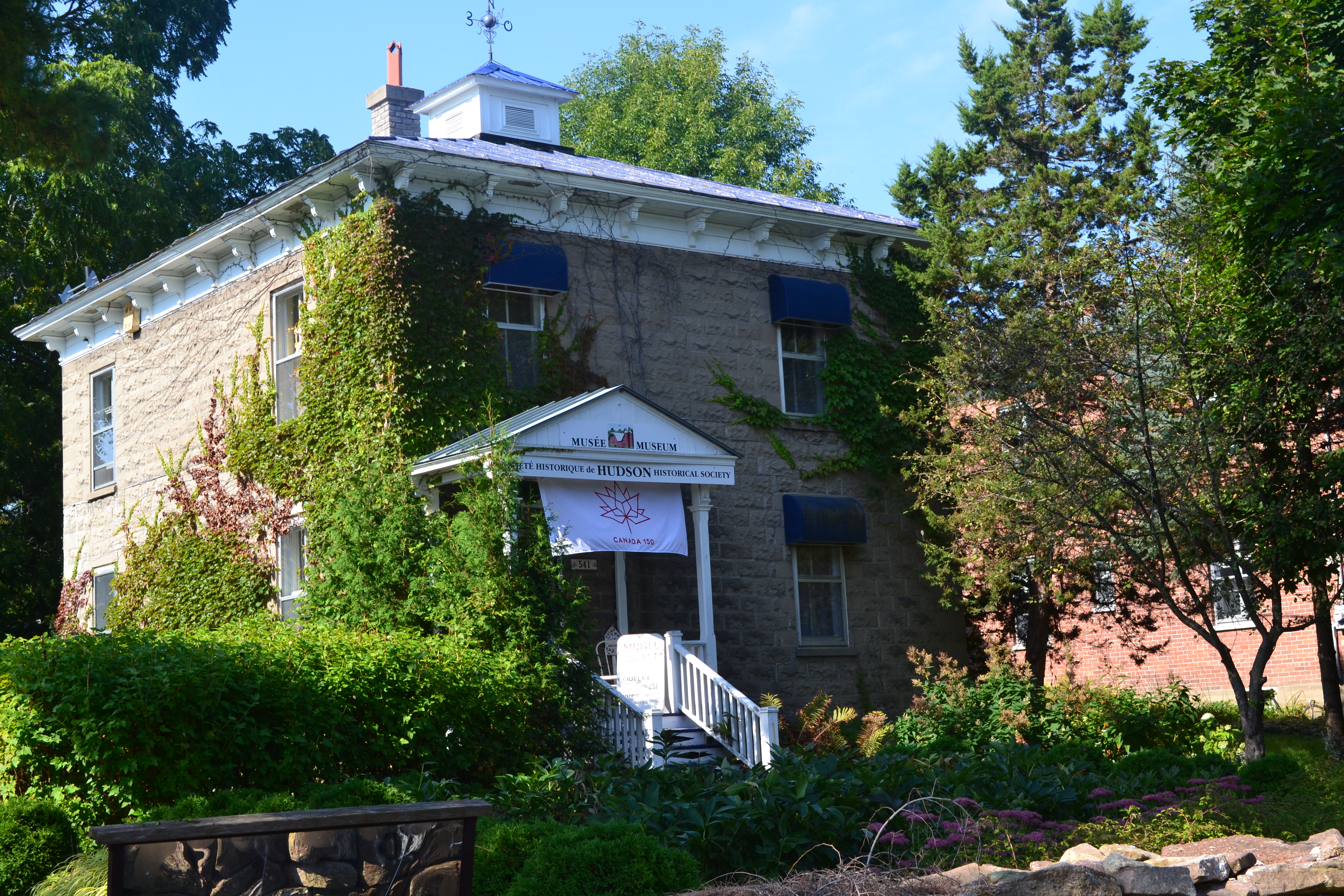
Hudson Museum

Tourist attractions of Hudson include:

- Artistes Hudson Artists, Quebec's oldest continuing English language art club
- Hudson & Region Studio Tour
- The Hudson Players Club, Quebec's oldest continually operating theatre company, English or French, professional or amateur
- The Village Theatre (located in the historic train station)
- The Hudson Film Society
- Greenwood Centre for Living History
- St. James', St. Mary's, Wyman Memorial United and St. Thomas Aquinas churches
- Chateau du Lac (bar in a historic building)
- The Hudson Music Fest

Notable annual events in Hudson include the Hudson Street Fair, the Hudson Yacht Club Labour Day Regatta, the FruitBowl Regatta (North America's most well-attended youth sailing event), Canada Day festivities, Shiver Fest (a winter carnival), the Turn on the Lights Festival, the Hudson & Region Studio Tour, the Home & Gardens Tour, the Hudson Festival of Canadian Film, the Santa Claus Parade and (as of 2010) the St. Patrick's Day Parade.

=== Hudson Yacht Club ===
The Hudson Yacht Club (HYC) is a private boating and social club founded in 1909 on the shores of Lake of Two Mountains (Lac des Deux Montagnes). The club annually hosts the "FruitBowl" regatta, often attended by 100+ young sailors from the Optimist class, ILCA (with the most popular being the ILCA 6), and Club 420 class. The yacht club is also famous for its annual Labour Day Regatta, held since 1947, attended by larger monohull sailboats. The competition is characterized by the long-distance leg, starting at the Île aux Tourtes Bridge and sailing up the Ottawa River to the Pointe aux Anglais lighthouse. The finish line is at the T-pier at HYC, where the race committee boat (RC) is anchored. In 2023, the Hudson Yacht Club was selected to host the 2024 Canadian Optimist Championship, where 129 athletes attended (90 of whom were in the Optimist Championship Fleet, therefore eligible for various international regattas, such as Opti Worlds, Optimist European Championship, Optimist North American Championship, and Optimist South American Championship). The HYC has published two retrospectives: Hudson Yacht Club: Seventy-Fifth Anniversary Year in 1984 and Our Spirit Lives On: A Celebration of Hudson Yacht Club's First 100 Years, 1909-2009 in 2009.

== Government ==
=== Municipal council ===
The Quebec Cities and Towns Act requires all towns the size of Hudson to have a municipal council of six councillors and one mayor, elected by the local population every four years. The mayor is elected by all Hudson residents, while the town is divided into six wards to elect the councillors. Given the small size of the town, council seats are often won by acclamation. Council meets once per month in the Stephen Shaar Community Centre, named after the mayor who served until 2004 (and presided over its construction). Municipal administrators work in the Town Hall. Town council is responsible for things such as water supply, local road maintenance, zoning, construction permits, and administration of parks. Some responsibilities, such as regional planning, is shared with the county. Council receives its revenues through property taxes, which it establishes. The town maintains its own volunteer fire department and a local patrol to enforce municipal by-laws.

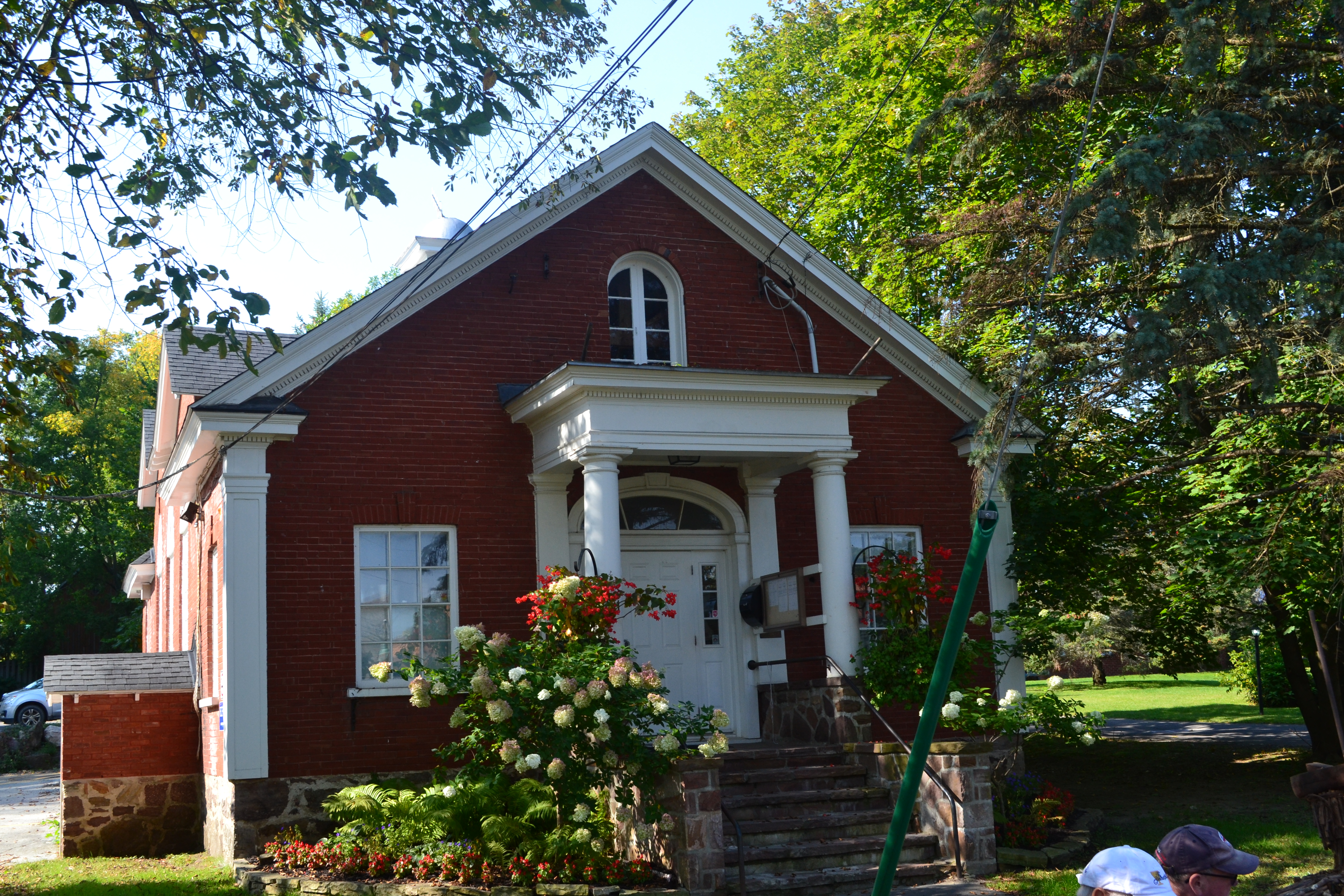
Hudson Town Hall

Mayor
Chloe Hutchison

| Councillor | District |
|---|---|
| Robert Johnson | #1 Como |
| Matthew Stenberg | #2 Hudson - East |
| Andrew Dumas | #3 Hudson – Center |
| Reid Thompson | #4 Fairhaven |
| Mark Gray | #5 Heights - East |
| Daren Legault | #6 West |

=== Former mayors ===
List of former mayors:

- George N. Armstrong (1969–1973)
- Job Taylor Bradbury (1973–1989)
- Gilbert Michael Elliott (1989–1993, 2009–2013)
- Stephen F. Shaar (1993–2004)
- Elizabeth Corker (2004–2009)
- Diane Paciente (interim mayor 2013)
- Ed Prévost (2013–2017)
- Jamie Nicholls (2017–2021)
- Chloe Hutchison (2021–present)

== Economy ==
Hudson's local economy is based on trade and services. Catering establishments and places to socialize include for example the Café Carambola. The problem of parking is slowing down the development of new activities. The Hudson Business Development Corporation comprises 108 companies. Agricultural activity, which is rather limited, includes apple cultivation at Hudson's Orchards. The main commercial buildings are the Manoir Cavagnal, the IGA Plaza, the Whitlock Golf Club and Country Club and the Burnet Plus Medicentre.

== Infrastructure ==
=== Transportation ===
A single street, Main Road, traverses Hudson east to west, while the southern border of the town mainly runs along Quebec Route 342 (also known as Boulevard Harwood). Although many residents commute by automobile, a commuter train to Montreal (Vaudreuil-Hudson Line) stops in Hudson once per weekday in either direction.

The town is also served by the 21 bus from the Exo La Presqu'Île, terminating at the Vaudreuil train station.

==== Ferry to Oka ====
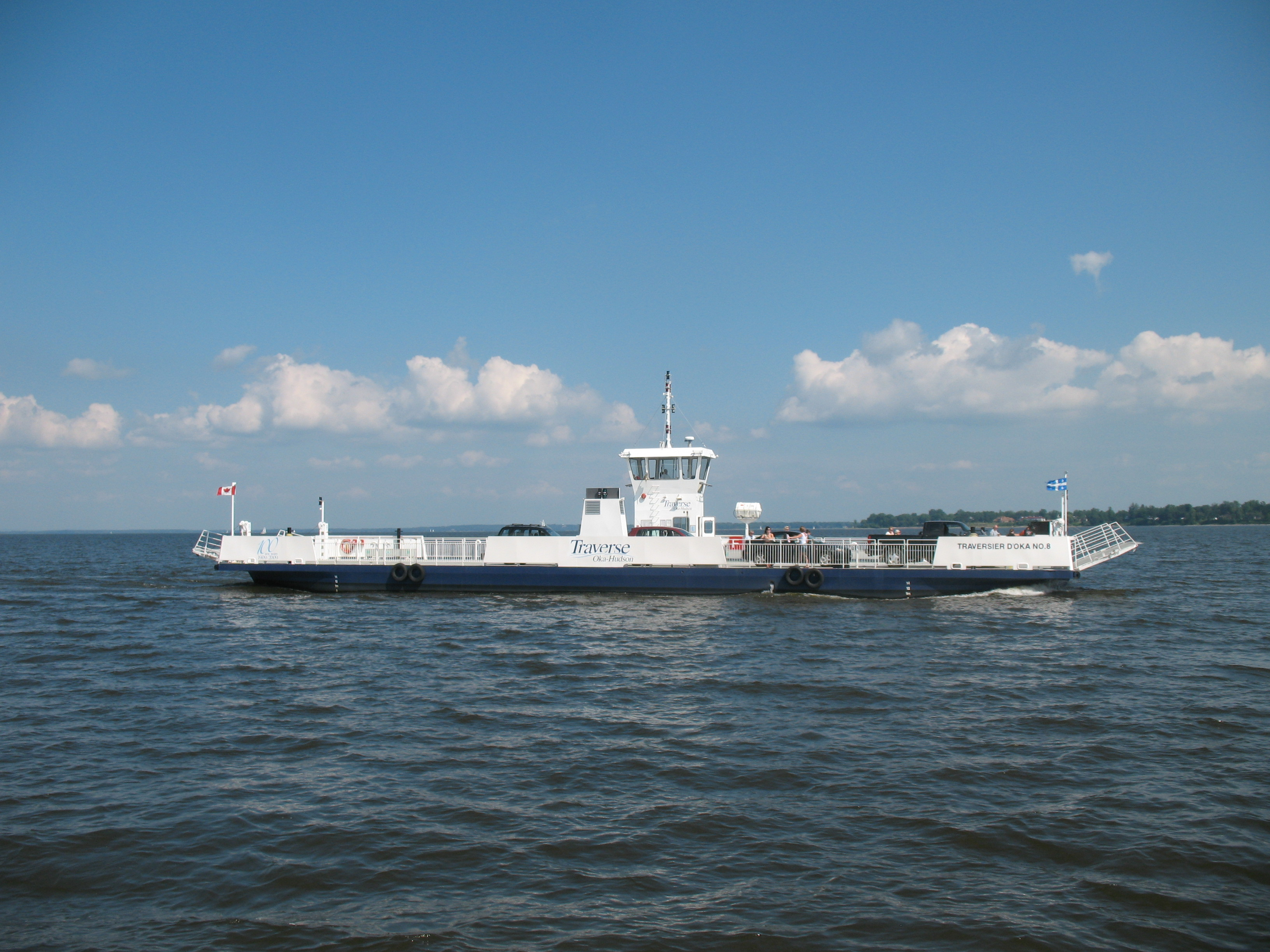
Ferry boat from Oka

Since 1909, a ferry across the Lake of Two Mountains has run from Hudson to Oka during the spring, summer and fall. Ferries are self-propelled and take ten to fifteen minutes to carry multiple automobiles, bike passengers, and foot passengers for a fee. Prior to the change to self-propelled ferries, a system of barges were towed across the lake by ropes attached to diesel powered tugboats.

During the winter months, a tolled ice bridge allows vehicular traffic between the two towns.

=== Water and sewage ===
Hudson has a municipal water and sewage system. The sewage system was built in the first decade of the 21st century and serves the central area of town. It is relatively common for houses outside the central area to use well water and/or a septic tank.

=== Municipal facilities ===
The town operates the Stephen Shaar Community Centre, teen centre (in the lower level of the community centre) and a municipal outdoor swimming pool. The town also has a number of parks, including St. Thomas Park (soccer fields behind the swimming pool), Thompson park (lakeside soccer fields), Benson Park (with a softball field, children's playground with outdoor hockey and skating rinks), Jack Layton Park (trails to Sandy Beach, picnic area and public boat launch) and Sandy Beach.

== Education ==
The town has three schools, of which two are English (Mount Pleasant Elementary School & Westwood Senior, formerly Hudson High School) and one French (St-Thomas Elementary School), as well as six churches: one Baptist (Hudson Community Baptist Church), one Catholic (St-Thomas Aquinas), two Anglican (St-James & St-Mary's), one United (Wyman), and one Reformed Presbyterian Church of North America (Hudson-Saint-Lazare)

Commission Scolaire des Trois-Lacs operates Francophone schools.

- École Saint-Thomas

Lester B. Pearson School Board operates Anglophone schools.

- Mount Pleasant Elementary School
- Westwood Senior Campus

== Notable people ==
- Lauren Chen, conservative political commentator and former YouTuber
- Lorne Elliott, comedian, musician and former presenter for CBC Radio
- Paul Frappier was a Montreal-based Canadian entertainer, musician, and hip hop MC of Haitian origin, better known by his stage name Bad News Brown.
- Sam Goldberg Jr., musician, best known as member of Broken Social Scene
- David Greenblatt, race car driver and Canadian Motorsport Hall of Fame inductee (1998)
- Jean-Paul L'Allier, former mayor of Quebec City
- Jack Layton, former leader of the New Democratic Party
- Vanessa Lengies, actress, best known for Are You Afraid of the Dark, Popular Mechanics For Kids, American Dreams, and Glee
- Matthew Lombardi, NHL hockey player for the Toronto Maple Leafs (formerly Calgary Flames, Phoenix Coyotes, Nashville Predators)
- A.M. Pattison, artist, commercial artist and architect
- Larry Smith, former Canadian Football League Commissioner and current Conservative Senator
- P.J. Stock, former NHL hockey player for the New York Rangers, Montreal Canadiens, Philadelphia Flyers and Boston Bruins and current commentator on French-Canadian sports channel RDS
- Amanda Walsh, best known for being a MuchMusic VJ (2000–2004), as well as her role in film Ghosts of Girlfriends Past (2009), and recurring roles in Sons & Daughters and The Big Bang Theory
- Patrick Watson, musician, best known for 2007 single "The great escape"
- Kuno Wittmer, racing driver
- Thomas Bassett Macaulay, (actuary, philanthropist and agriculturalist), known for establishing the original Holstein cattle line at his Mount Victoria farm in the 1930s.

== See also ==
- List of anglophone communities in Quebec
- List of cities in Quebec
