= Vaudreuil–Hudson line =

Commuter rail service in Greater Montreal, Quebec

Vaudreuil–Hudson
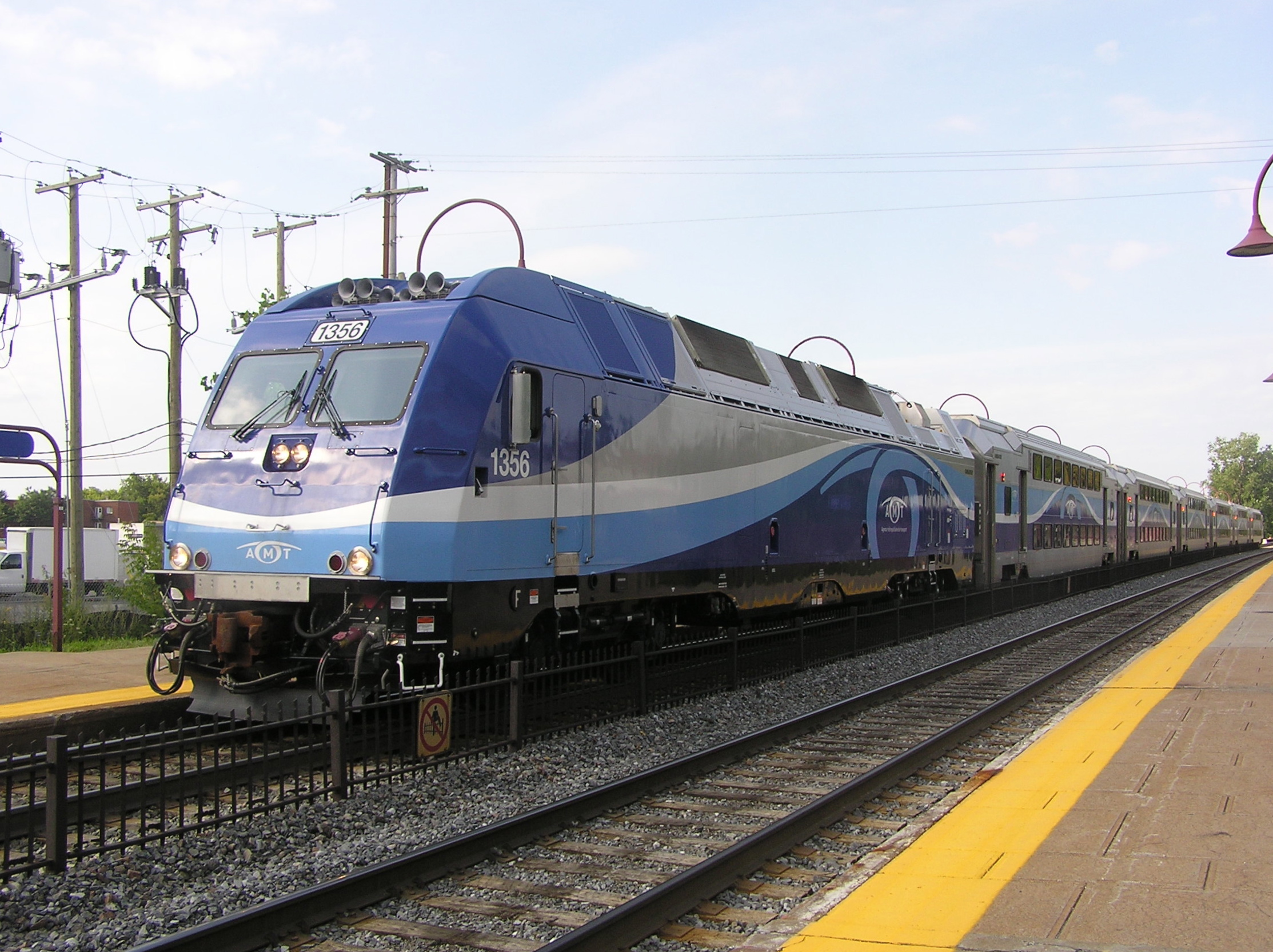
- An inbound train at Vendôme Station.

Overview
- Line number: 11
- Locale: Greater Montreal
- Termini: Hudson; Vaudreuil; Beaconsfield; Lucien-L'Allier
- Stations: 18
- Website: Vaudreuil–Hudson line (Exo)

Service
- Type: Commuter rail
- System: Exo commuter rail
- Operator: Alstom
- Daily ridership: 11,122 (2025)
- Ridership: 2,902,975 (2025)

History
- Opened: 1887

Technical
- Line length: 64.2 km (39.9 mi)
- Track gauge: 1,435 mm (4 ft 8 1/2 in) standard gauge
- Electrification: No
- Operating speed: 75 mph (121 km/h)
Route map
Vaudreuil–Hudson line highlighted in red

Vaudreuil–Hudson (also designated line 11, formerly known as Dorion–Rigaud) is a commuter rail service in Greater Montreal, Quebec. It is operated by Exo, the organization that operates the commuter rail network in Greater Montreal.

The Vaudreuil–Hudson line was originally established in 1887 as a Canadian Pacific Railway (CPR) passenger service known as the CP Lakeshore West line. It was transferred to Société de transport de Montréal (STCUM) on 1 October 1982. It was refurbished between 1982 and 1990. On 1 January 1996, it was transferred to Exo's predecessor agency, the Agence Métropolitaine de transport (AMT). Exo assumed current operation of the line upon its establishment on 1 June 2017.

There are 13 inbound and 14 outbound departures each weekday.

== Overview ==
This line links the Lucien-L'Allier station in downtown Montreal with Hudson to the west of the Island of Montreal. With the completion of the Intermodal station in Vaudreuil, most trains that used to terminate in Dorion, now terminate in Vaudreuil.

The line offers frequent peak-hour service (roughly every 15–20 minutes) to or from Vaudreuil. Outside of rush hours, service is approximately every two to three hours. On weekends, service is approximately every five hours. There are three weekday round trips from the Hudson terminus. All other trains start or ends in Vaudreuil, except for the train that short-turns in Beaconsfield. This is the only line in Montreal to offer semi-express service; reverse peak trains do not stop at certain smaller stations.

The trains are owned and managed by the Réseau de transport métropolitain, and operated by Alstom's Transportation division (formerly Bombardier Transportation).

== History ==
=== CP Service ===
Service on this line started in 1887. Service began with local stops between Montreal and Rigaud being added to trains running between Montreal and Ottawa. Over time, as the population of the western part of the Island of Montreal increased, Canadian Pacific established a dedicated commuter service with several stops on the Island of Montreal and off the western tip of the Island. From 1956 to 2006, service patterns on the line did not change all that much. The average number of weekday round trips hovered around 12, with weekend and holiday service averaging 3 or 4 trips depending on whether the day is Saturday or Sunday.

=== STCUM and AMT Service ===
The commuter line was owned and operated by Canadian Pacific until 1 October 1982. On that date, management and ownership of the commuter trains was transferred to the publicly owned Montreal Urban Community Transit Commission (STCUM). The STCUM set fares and schedules, and assumed ownership of the equipment (passenger cars and locomotives) that Canadian Pacific had used to operate the service. Canadian Pacific continued to provide the tracks, stations, storage, maintenance, and train crews needed to keep the line running. For Montreal commuters, the transfer of ownership was positive because the trains were integrated into the bus and metro system. Over time, the commuter line was upgraded with the purchase of new equipment and renovated stations. The line was transferred to the newly formed Agence métropolitaine de transport (AMT) on 1 January 1996.

On 1 July 2010, service to Rigaud was discontinued, as the town of Rigaud was unable to justify a $300,000 annual fee, almost double the previous annual fee of $160,000 required by the AMT to maintain train service for a handful of users. The line now ends at Hudson; the 13-km distance between Rigaud and Hudson represented some 17% of the line's total length. At this time the line was renamed: "Dorion" was replaced by "Vaudreuil" in reference to the terminus for most runs, and "Rigaud" was replaced by "Hudson" in reference to the terminus for the extended service.

=== RTM/Exo service ===
On 1 June 2017, the AMT was dissolved and replaced by two new governing bodies, the Autorité régionale de transport métropolitain (ARTM) and the Réseau de transport métropolitain (RTM). The RTM took over all former AMT services, including this line.

In May 2018, the RTM formally re-branded itself as Exo; and renamed each line with a number and updated colour. The Vaudreuil–Hudson line became exo1, and the red line colour was updated to a lighter pastel shade of red. In 2023, the service was renumbered to line 11 in order to be unique within the Montreal rail network.

== List of stations ==
Station	Location	Connections	Zones
Hudson	Hudson	Exo: 188	C
Vaudreuil	Vaudreuil-Dorion	Exo: 188, 189, 190, 191, 192, 193, 194, 490, 491, 493, 695	C
Dorion	Vaudreuil-Dorion	Exo: 190, 191, 200, 591, 793	C
Pincourt–Terrasse-Vaudreuil	Pincourt / Terrasse-Vaudreuil		C
Île-Perrot	Île-Perrot	Exo: 210, 211, 212, 591, 593, 793	C
Sainte-Anne-de-Bellevue	Sainte-Anne-de-Bellevue	STM: 212, 354; STM: 281	A
Baie-d'Urfé	Baie-D'Urfé	STM: 223, 354 STM: 284, 294	A
Beaurepaire	Beaconsfield	STM: 354 STM: 295	A
Beaconsfield	Beaconsfield	STM: 200, 201, 211, 221, 354, 382	A
Cedar Park	Pointe-Claire	STM: 202, 221, 230	A
Pointe-Claire	Pointe-Claire	STM: 203, 211, 354, 411	A
Valois	Pointe-Claire	STM: 202, 203, 204 STM: 270	A
Pine Beach	Dorval	STM: 204, 211, 354, 356, 411 STM: 271	A
Dorval	Dorval	Dorval station (Via Rail); STM: 195, 198, 202, 203, 204, 209, 211, 214, 354, 356, 378, 411, 460, 496 STM: 293	A
Lachine	Lachine, Montreal	STM: 287	A
Montréal-Ouest	Montreal West	STM: 51, 105, 123, 162, 356	A
Vendôme	Côte-des-Neiges–Notre-Dame-de-Grâce, Montreal	Vendôme Metro station Buses	A
Lucien-L'Allier	Ville-Marie, Montreal	Lucien-L'Allier Metro station Buses	A

The commuter line operates over the following Canadian Pacific Kansas City subdivisions:

- Westmount Subdivision (between Lucien L'Allier [0.1] and Montreal West [4.6])
- Vaudreuil Subdivision (between Montreal-West [0.0] and Dorion [18.9])
- M&O Subdivision (between Dorion [0.0] and Rigaud [16.5]; owned by Exo)
