= Vaudreuil station =

Railway station in Quebec, Canada

Vaudreuil
- Train platforms, shelter and station in the background

General information
- Location: 3101 Station Boulevard; Vaudreuil-Dorion, Quebec J7V 0T5
- Coordinates: 45°23′56″N 74°03′02″W
- Operator: Exo
- Platforms: 2 side platforms (Spanish solution)
- Tracks: 1
- Connections: Exo bus services

Construction
- Parking: 593 park-and-ride, 2 carpooling, and 6 disabled spaces
- Cycle facilities: 77 spaces

Other information
- Fare zone: ARTM: C
- Website: Vaudreuil Station (RTM)

History
- Opened: 2003

Passengers
- 2019: 538,900

Services
Preceding station	Exo	Following station
Terminus	Line 11 – Vaudreuil–Hudson	Dorion toward Lucien-L'Allier
Hudson Terminus	Line 11 – Vaudreuil–Hudson Limited service	Dorion toward Lucien-L'Allier
Location

Vaudreuil station (French pronunciation: [vodʁœj]) is a commuter rail station operated by Exo in Vaudreuil-Dorion, Quebec, Canada. It is served by the Vaudreuil–Hudson line.

As of December 2024, on weekdays, 9 of 13 inbound trains originate at this station, and 10 of 14 outbound trains on the line terminate here, the exception being one short-turned train in each direction terminating or originating at Beaconsfield station. On weekends, all trains (four on Saturday and three on Sunday in each direction) originate or terminate here.

The station was built in 2003. It is located near the interchange of Autoroute 40 and Autoroute 30, on Boulevard de la Gare, and is surrounded by new development that followed its construction. The station was originally built as a single-track, single-platform station. In 2019, as part of a large-scale renovation, a second platform was added to the other side of the single track so that passengers can embark and alight on either side of the train, saving them from having to cross the track.

The renovation also included the construction of a passenger service centre, permanent bus shelters, more parking spaces, and bicycle facilities. The new constructions were built in a modernist style inspired by the International Style of Ludwig Mies van der Rohe. The renovation also added a work of public art, making Vaudreuil only the second station on the line to have one: a coloured mural printed on glass by Marianne Chevalier, entitled De verts et de vents. It is located on the façade of the service centre.

== Connecting bus routes ==
Buses at Vaudreuil station serve the bus terminus right next to the station.

Exo La Presqu'Île sector
No.	Route	Connects to	Service times / notes	Terminus wing and gate
188	Terminus Vaudreuil - Hudson	Hudson	Weekdays only	10
189	Terminus Vaudreuil - Saint-Lazare		Weekdays only	7
190	Terminus Vaudreuil - St-Charles - Gare Dorion	Dorion	Daily	6
191	Terminus Vaudreuil - Valois - Gare Dorion	Dorion	Daily	5
192	Terminus Vaudreuil - Joseph-Carrier		Weekdays only	3
193	Terminus Vaudreuil - Ouimet - Floralies		Weekdays only	2
194	Terminus Vaudreuil - Émile-Bouchard - Floralies		Weekdays only	4
490	Terminus Vaudreuil - Bourget - REM	Anse-à-l'Orme	Daily	11
491	Terminus Vaudreuil - REM	Anse-à-l'Orme	Weekdays only	12
493	Terminus Vaudreuil - Cégep John Abbott		Weekdays only	8
695	Rigaud - Terminus Vaudreuil		Weekdays only	9
Exo Transport adapté
No.	Route	Connects to	Service times / notes	Terminus wing and gate
TA ♿︎	Exo Transport adapté			Taxi
Société de transport de Salaberry-de-Valleyfield
No.	Route	Connects to	Services times / notes	Terminus wing and gate
99	Valleyfield - Vaudreuil			1
338	Valleyfield - Les Cèdres - Pointe-des-Cascades - Vaudreuil		On-demand only	Taxi
TA ♿︎	SVSV Transport adapté			Taxi
