= Rigaud station =

Railway station in Rigaud, Canada

Rigaud
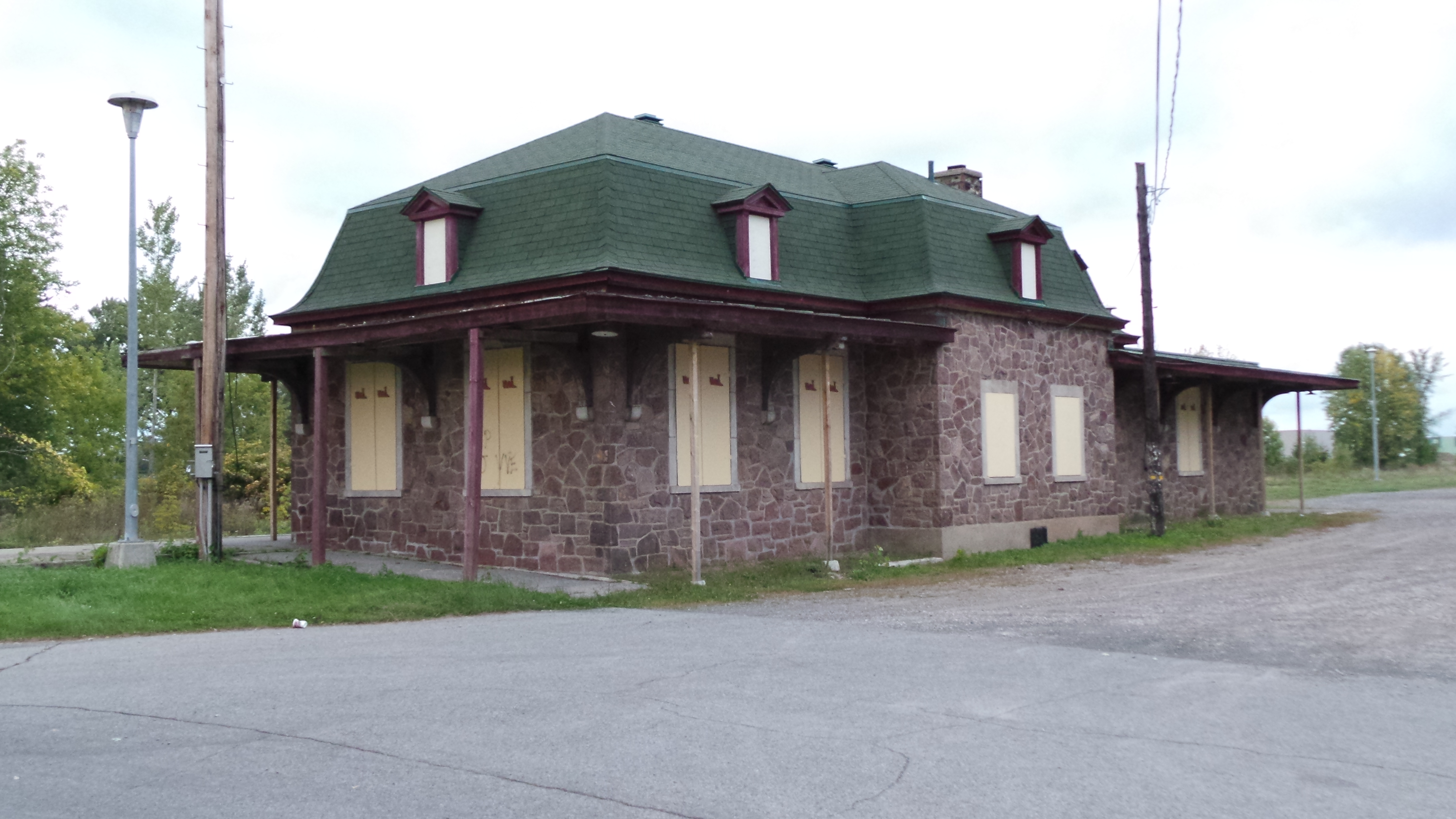
- The closed stationhouse in 2013

General information
- Location: 15 rue Charlebois, Rigaud; Quebec, Canada
- Coordinates: 45°28′52″N 74°18′00″W
- Line: formerly Dorion-Rigaud Line

Other information
- Fare zone: 5

History
- Opened: September 21, 1891
- Closed: June 30, 2010

Passengers
- 2008: 8,800

Former services
Preceding station	Exo	Following station
Terminus	Line 11 – Vaudreuil–Hudson	Hudson toward Lucien-L'Allier
Preceding station	Canadian Pacific Railway	Following station
St. Eugene toward Ottawa	Ottawa – Montreal; Short Line	Dragon toward Montreal Windsor
Terminus	Montreal – Rigaud local stops	Dragon toward Montreal Windsor
Location

Rigaud station was a commuter rail station in Rigaud, Quebec, Canada. The station originally opened in 1891, and was eventually served by the AMT Dorion-Rigaud commuter line, with one round trip train per day. In 2010, AMT ended service after Rigaud was unable to pay the annual fee.

== Discontinuation of service to Rigaud ==
Train service was cut to Hudson as of July 1, 2010, as the town of Rigaud was unable to pay the $300,000 annual fee to the AMT to allow service to continue to the town. Rigaud paid higher rates to the AMT and received less service than other stations, as it is not part of the Montreal Metropolitan Community. Up until that date, the Rigaud station had continuous railroad service since the original Canadian Pacific station opened in 1891.

Following the closure of Rigaud station, the line was renamed the Vaudreuil-Hudson Line.
