= Hudson station (Exo) =

Railway station in Quebec, Canada

Hudson
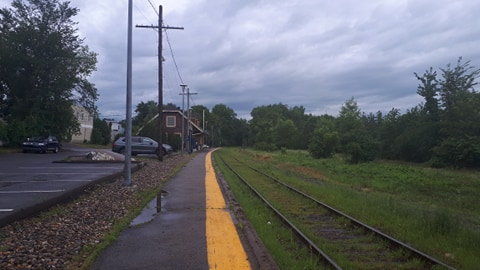

General information
- Location: 30 Wharf Street; Hudson, Quebec J0P 1H0
- Coordinates: 45°27′34″N 74°08′25″W
- Operator: Exo
- Platforms: 1 side platform
- Tracks: 1
- Connections: Exo bus services

Construction
- Parking: 47 Park-and-Ride, 2 Carpooling, and 2 Disabled spaces
- Cycle facilities: 7 spaces

Other information
- Fare zone: ARTM: C
- Website: Hudson Station (RTM)

Passengers
- 2019: 27,200 (Exo)

Services
Preceding station	Exo	Following station
Terminus	Line 11 – Vaudreuil–Hudson Limited service	Vaudreuil toward Lucien-L'Allier
Former services
Preceding station	Canadian Pacific Railway	Following station
Choisy toward Ottawa	Ottawa – Montreal; Short Line	Como toward Montreal Windsor
Hudson Heights toward Rigaud	Montreal – Rigaud local stops	Como toward Montreal Windsor
Preceding station	Exo	Following station
Rigaud Closed 2010 Terminus	Line 11 – Vaudreuil–Hudson	Vaudreuil toward Lucien-L'Allier
Location

Hudson station is a commuter rail station operated by Exo in Hudson, Quebec, Canada.

It is served by the Vaudreuil–Hudson line, with 3 Montreal-bound trips in the morning peak and 3 trips terminating in the evening peak. The station is only served weekdays.

Hudson became the new terminus of the Vaudreuil–Hudson Line on June 30, 2010, after the town of Rigaud was unable to pay its annual fee to the former AMT to continue train service to Rigaud station.

Hudson is the least used station on the Exo commuter rail network, with an average of around 104 passengers per weekday.

== Connecting bus routes ==
Exo La Presqu'Île sector
No.	Route	Connects to	Service times / notes
188	Terminus Vaudreuil - Hudson	Vaudreuil	Weekdays only
