= Prescott (provincial electoral district) =

Former provincial electoral district in Ontario, Canada

Ontario electoral district

Defunct provincial electoral district
- Legislature: Legislative Assembly of Ontario
- District created: 1867
- District abolished: 1966
- First contested: 1867
- Last contested: 1963

Prescott was an electoral riding in Ontario, Canada. It was created in 1867 at the time of confederation and was abolished in 1966 before the 1967 election.

== Members of Provincial Parliament ==
Prescott
Assembly	Years	Member	Party
1st	1867–1871	James P. Boyd	Liberal
2nd	1871–1874	George Wellesley Hamilton	Conservative
3rd	1875–1879	William Harkin	Conservative
4th	1879–1881	William Harkin	Conservative
4th	1881–1883	Albert Hagar	Liberal
5th	1883–1886	Albert Hagar	Liberal
6th	1886–1890	Alfred Évanturel	Liberal
7th	1890–1894	Alfred Évanturel	Liberal
8th	1894–1898	Alfred Évanturel	Liberal
9th	1898–1902	Alfred Évanturel	Liberal
10th	1902–1904	Alfred Évanturel	Liberal
11th	1905–1908	Louis-Joseph Labrosse	Liberal
12th	1908–1911	Georges Pharand	Conservative
13th	1911–1914	Gustave Évanturel	Liberal
14th	1914–1919	Gustave Évanturel	Liberal
15th	1919–1923	Gustave Évanturel	Liberal
16th	1923–1926	Edmond Proulx	Liberal
17th	1926–1929	Edmond Proulx	Liberal
18th	1929–1934	Joseph St. Denis	Conservative
19th	1934–1937	Aurélien Bélanger	Liberal
20th	1937–1943	Aurélien Bélanger	Liberal
21st	1943–1945	Aurélien Bélanger	Liberal
22nd	1945–1948	Aurélien Bélanger	Liberal
23rd	1948–1951	Louis-Pierre Cécile	Progressive Conservative
24th	1951–1955	Louis-Pierre Cécile	Progressive Conservative
25th	1955–1959	Louis-Pierre Cécile	Progressive Conservative
26th	1959–1963	Louis-Pierre Cécile	Progressive Conservative
27th	1963–1967	Louis-Pierre Cécile	Progressive Conservative
Sourced from the Ontario Legislative Assembly
Combined with Russell to form Prescott and Russell before the 1967 election

== Election results ==
1963 Ontario general election
Party	Candidate	Votes	%	±%
Progressive Conservative	Louis-Pierre Cécile	6,700	55.46	–3.30
Liberal	René Bertrand	5,380	44.54	+3.30
Total valid votes		12,080	99.17	
Total rejected ballots		101	0.83	–0.50
Turnout		12,181	71.93	+2.74
Eligible voters		16,935		
Progressive Conservative hold		Swing		–3.30
Source: Elections Ontario

1959 Ontario general election
Party	Candidate	Votes	%	±%
Progressive Conservative	Louis-Pierre Cécile	6,587	58.76	–1.50
Liberal	Noel Bazinet	4,623	41.24	+1.50
Total valid votes		11,210	98.67	
Total rejected ballots		151	1.33	+0.14
Turnout		11,361	69.19	+3.34
Eligible voters		16,420		
Progressive Conservative hold		Swing		–1.50
Source: Elections Ontario

1955 Ontario general election
Party	Candidate	Votes	%	±%
Progressive Conservative	Louis-Pierre Cécile	6,385	60.26	+3.15
Liberal	Horace Dubois	4,210	39.74	–1.49
Total valid votes		10,595	98.82	
Total rejected ballots		127	1.18	+0.05
Turnout		10,722	65.85	–11.12
Eligible voters		16,283		
Progressive Conservative hold		Swing		+2.32
Source: Elections Ontario

1951 Ontario general election
Party	Candidate	Votes	%	±%
Progressive Conservative	Louis-Pierre Cécile	7,046	57.11	+1.10
Liberal	Louis Charbonneau	5,086	41.23	+4.01
Independent PC	Mary B. Mayer	149	1.21	–
Co-operative Commonwealth	Arthur Seguin	56	0.45	–1.08
Total valid votes		12,337	98.87	
Total rejected ballots		141	1.13	–0.07
Turnout		12,478	76.96	+3.12
Eligible voters		16,213		
Progressive Conservative hold		Swing		–1.45
Source: Elections Ontario

1948 Ontario general election
Party	Candidate	Votes	%	±%
Progressive Conservative	Louis-Pierre Cécile	6,537	56.01	+39.47
Liberal	Simon Bertrand	4,344	37.22	–14.09
Union of Electors	Euclide Boisvenue	611	5.24	–
Co-operative Commonwealth	François Bossé	179	1.53	–30.61
Total valid votes		11,671	98.80	
Total rejected ballots		142	1.20	+0.59
Turnout		11,813	73.85	–0.11
Eligible voters		15,997		
Progressive Conservative gain from Liberal		Swing		+26.78
Source: Elections Ontario

1945 Ontario general election
Party	Candidate	Votes	%	±%
Liberal	Aurélien Bélanger	6,037	51.31	–4.40
Co-operative Commonwealth	Omer H. Chartrand	3,782	32.15	–6.58
Progressive Conservative	Joseph St. Denis	1,946	16.54	+10.98
Total valid votes		11,765	99.39	
Total rejected ballots		72	0.61	–0.04
Turnout		11,837	73.95	+13.16
Eligible voters		16,006		
Liberal hold		Swing		+1.09
Source: Elections Ontario

1943 Ontario general election
Party	Candidate	Votes	%	±%
Liberal	Aurélien Bélanger	5,291	55.72	+1.80
Co-operative Commonwealth	Omer H. Chartrand	3,677	38.72	–
Progressive Conservative	Parnell Tierney	528	5.56	–1.78
Total valid votes		9,496	99.35	
Total rejected ballots		62	0.65	+0.12
Turnout		9,558	60.79	–9.74
Eligible voters		15,723		
Liberal hold		Swing		+0.90
Source: Elections Ontario

1937 Ontario general election
Party	Candidate	Votes	%	±%
Liberal	Aurélien Bélanger	6,357	53.91	+15.12
Independent Liberal	Louis-Mathias Auger	4,569	38.75	+1.72
Conservative	Louis Philippe Beaudoin	865	7.34	–16.84
Total valid votes		11,791	99.47	
Total rejected ballots		63	0.53	–0.15
Turnout		11,854	70.53	–6.27
Eligible voters		16,807		
Liberal hold		Swing		+6.70
Source: Elections Ontario

1934 Ontario general election
Party	Candidate	Votes	%	±%
Liberal	Aurélien Bélanger	5,004	38.79	+14.65
Independent Liberal	Louis-Mathias Auger	4,776	37.03	–
Conservative	Louis Philippe Beaudoin	3,119	24.18	–8.52
Total valid votes		12,899	99.32	
Total rejected ballots		88	0.68	+0.18
Turnout		12,987	76.80	–0.13
Eligible voters		16,910		
Liberal gain from Independent Conservative		Swing		+11.58
Source: Elections Ontario

1929 Ontario general election
Party	Candidate	Votes	%	±%
Independent Conservative	Joseph St. Denis	3,996	43.15	–
Conservative	Louis Philippe Beaudoin	3,028	32.70	–31.74
Liberal	F. X. Berthiaume	2,236	24.15	–
Total valid votes		9,260	99.51	
Total rejected ballots		46	0.49	+0.15
Turnout		9,306	76.93	+10.76
Eligible voters		12,096		
Independent Conservative gain from Independent Liberal		Swing		+15.87
Source: Elections Ontario

1926 Ontario general election
Party	Candidate	Votes	%	±%
Independent Liberal	Edmond Proulx	2,855	35.56	–17.31
Conservative	Edmund Alexander Mooney	2,831	35.26	–
Conservative	Louis Philippe Beaudoin	2,342	29.17	–
Total valid votes		8,028	99.65	
Total rejected ballots		28	0.35	–0.15
Turnout		8,056	66.17	+7.26
Eligible voters		12,174		
Independent Liberal hold		Swing		–8.65
Source: Elections Ontario

1923 Ontario general election
Party	Candidate	Votes	%	±%
Independent	Edmond Proulx	3,608	52.87	–
Liberal	Gustave Évanturel	2,868	42.03	–5.40
Labour	Fernand Villeneuve	348	5.10	–
Total valid votes		6,824	99.50	
Total rejected ballots		34	0.50	–1.48
Turnout		6,858	58.92	–9.78
Eligible voters		11,640		
Independent gain from Liberal		Swing		–
Source: Elections Ontario

1919 Ontario general election
Party	Candidate	Votes	%	±%
Liberal	Gustave Évanturel	3,929	47.43	+12.91
United Farmers	Joseph A. Caron	2,631	31.76	–
Conservative	Edmund Alexander Mooney	1,724	20.81	–1.67
Total valid votes		8,284	98.02	
Total rejected ballots		167	1.98	+0.92
Turnout		8,451	68.70	–8.38
Eligible voters		12,302		
Liberal hold		Swing		+6.46
Source: Elections Ontario

1914 Ontario general election
Party	Candidate	Votes	%	±%
Independent Liberal	Gustave Évanturel	1,768	43.01	–10.86
Liberal	Francis A. Senecal	1,419	34.52	–19.35
Conservative	Georges Pharand	924	22.48	–23.65
Total valid votes		4,111	98.94	
Total rejected ballots		44	1.06	+0.44
Turnout		4,155	77.07	+17.23
Eligible voters		5,391		
Independent Liberal gain from Liberal		Swing		+6.39
Source: Elections Ontario

1911 Ontario general election
Party	Candidate	Votes	%	±%
Liberal	Gustave Évanturel	1,976	53.87	+3.96
Conservative	Georges Pharand	1,692	46.13	–3.96
Total valid votes		3,668	99.38	
Total rejected ballots		23	0.62	+0.03
Turnout		3,691	59.84	–6.18
Eligible voters		6,168		
Liberal gain from Conservative		Swing		+3.96
Source: Elections Ontario

1908 Ontario general election
Party	Candidate	Votes	%	±%
Conservative	Georges Pharand	1,944	50.09	–
Liberal	Louis-Joseph Labrosse	1,937	49.91	–50.09
Total valid votes		3,881	99.41	
Total rejected ballots		23	0.59	+0.28
Turnout		3,904	66.02	–1.62
Eligible voters		5,913		
Conservative gain from Liberal		Swing		–
Source: Elections Ontario

1905 Ontario general election
Party	Candidate	Votes	%	±%
Liberal	Louis-Joseph Labrosse	2,093	50.01	–9.49
Liberal	Alfred Évanturel	2,092	49.99	–9.52
Total valid votes		4,185	99.69	
Total rejected ballots		13	0.31	+0.26
Turnout		4,198	67.64	+3.52
Eligible voters		6,206		
Liberal hold		Swing		+0.01
Source: Elections Ontario

1902 Ontario general election
Party	Candidate	Votes	%	±%
Liberal	Alfred Évanturel	2,341	59.51	–
Conservative	S. P. Poulin	1,593	40.49	–
Total valid votes		3,934	99.95	
Total rejected ballots		2	0.05	–
Turnout		3,936	64.13	–
Eligible voters		6,138		
Liberal hold		Swing		–
Source: Elections Ontario

1898 Ontario general election
Party	Candidate	Votes
Liberal	Alfred Évanturel	acclaimed
Source: Elections Ontario

1894 Ontario general election
Party	Candidate	Votes	%	±%
Liberal	Alfred Évanturel	2,038	71.06	–
Liberal-Patrons of Industry	J. Cross	830	28.94	–
Total valid votes		2,868	99.83	
Total rejected ballots		5	0.17	–
Turnout		2,873	58.42	–
Eligible voters		4,918		
Liberal hold		Swing		–
Source: Elections Ontario

1890 Ontario general election
Party	Candidate	Votes
Liberal	Alfred Évanturel	acclaimed
Source: Elections Ontario

1886 Ontario general election
Party	Candidate	Votes	%	±%
Liberal	Alfred Évanturel	1,665	52.24	+2.87
Liberal	J. H. Molloy	1,522	47.76	–
Total valid votes		3,187	99.47	
Total rejected ballots		17	0.53	–0.09
Turnout		3,204	69.25	–3.98
Eligible voters		4,627		
Liberal hold		Swing		–
Source: Elections Ontario

1883 Ontario general election
Party	Candidate	Votes	%	±%
Liberal	Albert Hagar	1,292	50.63	+4.79
Liberal	Alfred Évanturel	1,260	49.37	–
Total valid votes		2,552	99.38	
Total rejected ballots		16	0.62	+0.62
Turnout		2,568	73.23	–
Eligible voters		3,507		
Liberal hold		Swing		+0.63
Source: Elections Ontario

Ontario provincial by-election, April 14, 1881 Death of William Harkin
Party	Candidate	Votes	%	±%
Liberal	Albert Hagar	1,002	45.84	+12.93
Liberal	Simon Labrosse	950	43.46	+10.55
Unknown	Lee	119	5.44	–
Unknown	Butterfield	115	5.26	–
Total valid votes		2,186	100.00	
Total rejected ballots		–		
Turnout		2,186	–	–
Eligible voters				
Liberal gain from Conservative		Swing		+1.19
Source: Elections Ontario

1879 Ontario general election
Party	Candidate	Votes	%	±%
Conservative	William Harkin	900	47.62	−14.95
Liberal	Mr. Ryan	622	32.91	−4.52
Independent	S. Johnson	232	12.28	
Independent	Mr. Vanbridger	136	7.20	
Total valid votes		1,890	58.77	−0.84
Eligible voters		3,216		
Conservative hold		Swing		−5.22
Source: Elections Ontario

1875 Ontario general election
Party	Candidate	Votes	%	±%
Conservative	William Harkin	988	62.57	+8.31
Liberal	R.P. Pattee	591	37.43	−8.31
Total valid votes		1,579	59.61	−16.01
Eligible voters		2,649		
Conservative hold		Swing		+8.31
Source: Elections Ontario

Ontario provincial by-election, December 1871 Previous election voided
Party	Candidate	Votes
Conservative	George Wellesley Hamilton	Acclaimed
Source: History of the Electoral Districts, Legislatures and Ministries of the Province of Ontario

1871 Ontario general election
Party	Candidate	Votes	%
Conservative	George Wellesley Hamilton	853	54.26
Liberal	James P. Boyd	719	45.74
Turnout		1,572	75.61
Eligible voters		2,079	
Election voided
Source: Elections Ontario

1867 Ontario general election
Party	Candidate	Votes	%
Liberal	James P. Boyd	838	50.67
Conservative	Thomas D'Arcy McGee	816	49.33
Total valid votes		1,654	82.78
Eligible voters		1,998	
Liberal pickup new district.			
Source: Elections Ontario
