= Isidore Proulx =

Canadian politician

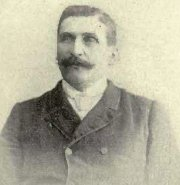

Member of the Canadian Parliament for Prescott
- In office 1891–1904
- Preceded by: Simon Labrosse
- Succeeded by: Edmond Proulx

Personal details
- Born: March 13, 1840 Saint-Hermas, Lower Canada
- Died: July 28, 1904 (aged 64)
- Party: Liberal
- Relations: Marcel Proulx, Great-grandson
- Children: Edmond Proulx

Isidore Proulx (March 13, 1840 – July 28, 1904) was an Ontario farmer, merchant and political figure. He represented Prescott in the House of Commons of Canada, as a Liberal Party member from 1891 to 1904.

Proulx was born in Saint-Hermas, Lower Canada in 1840, and he served as clerk for Saint-Hermas for 20 years. In 1861, he married Philomène Lalande. Proulx ran unsuccessfully in the riding of Deux-Montagnes for a seat in the Quebec legislative assembly in 1874. He moved to Plantagenet, Ontario in 1881, where he was a justice of the peace and served five years as reeve for North Plantagenet Township. His first election in 1891 was declared invalid after an appeal but he won the subsequent by-election. After his death in office in 1904, his son Edmond was elected to replace him in the House of Commons.

1891 Canadian federal election: Prescott
Party	Candidate	Votes
Liberal	Isidore Proulx	1,269
Conservative	Félix Routhier	608
Unknown	E. A. Johnson	532
Unknown	David Bertrand	335

By-election: On Mr. Proulx being unseated, 15 December 1891: Prescott
Party	Candidate	Votes
Liberal	Isidore Proulx	acclaimed

1896 Canadian federal election: Prescott
Party	Candidate	Votes
Liberal	Isidore Proulx	1,334
Patrons of Industry	Henry Joseph Cloran	996
Conservative	Dosithé Sabourin	902

1900 Canadian federal election: Prescott
Party	Candidate	Votes
Liberal	Isidore Proulx	1,596
Liberal	Henry Joseph Cloran	1,177
Conservative	Dosithé Sabourin	1,049
