= Edmond Proulx =

Canadian politician

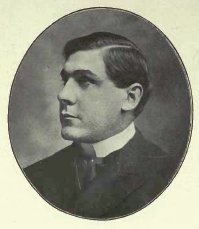

Ontario MPP
- In office 1923–1929
- Preceded by: Gustave Évanturel
- Succeeded by: Joseph St. Denis
- Constituency: Prescott

Member of Parliament for Prescott
- In office 1904–1921
- Preceded by: Isidore Proulx
- Succeeded by: Joseph Binette

Personal details
- Born: 21 May 1875 Saint-Hermas, Quebec, Canada
- Died: 26 December 1956 (aged 81) Sudbury, Ontario, Canada
- Party: Liberal
- Spouse: Renée Audette (m. 1907)
- Education: St Michael's College, Toronto
- Occupation: Lawyer

Edmond Proulx (21 May 1875 – 26 December 1956) was an Ontario lawyer and political figure. He represented Prescott in the House of Commons of Canada as a Liberal member from 1904 to 1921 and in the Legislative Assembly of Ontario as an Independent Liberal from 1923 to 1929.

He was born in Saint-Hermas, Quebec in 1875, the son of Isidore Proulx and Philomène Lalande, and grew up in Plantagenet, Ontario. Proulx studied at the Collège Bourget in Rigaud, Quebec, the University of Ottawa, St. Michael's College, Toronto and Osgoode Hall. He articled in Ottawa and Toronto, was called to the bar and set up practice in L'Orignal in 1904. He was elected to the House of Commons in the general election later that year after the death of his father. In 1907, he married Renée Audette. Proulx ran unsuccessfully for the Prescott seat as an Independent Liberal in 1921 but was elected to the provincial assembly two years later, defeating Gustave Évanturel, the official Liberal candidate. In 1929, he was named a judge for Sudbury district.

Proulx retired from the bench in 1950. He died in Sudbury at the age of 81.

== Electoral record ==
1904 Canadian federal election: Prescott
Party	Candidate	Votes
Liberal	Edmond Proulx	2,388
Conservative	L. Charbonneau	1,323

1908 Canadian federal election: Prescott
Party	Candidate	Votes
Liberal	Edmond Proulx	2,527
Independent	Eugène-Grégoire Quesnel	1,070

1911 Canadian federal election: Prescott
Party	Candidate	Votes
Liberal	Edmond Proulx	2,532
Nationalist Conservative	Eugène-Grégoire Quesnel	1,220

1917 Canadian federal election: Prescott
Party	Candidate	Votes
Opposition (Laurier Liberals)	Edmond Proulx	3,743
Government (Unionist)	Andrew Richard Metcalfe	1,439

1921 Canadian federal election: Prescott
Party	Candidate	Votes
Progressive	Joseph Binette	3,661
Independent Liberal	Edmond Proulx	2,764
Liberal	Amédée Sabourin	2,359
