= Gustave Évanturel =

Canadian politician

Member of Parliament for Prescott
- In office 1925–1926
- Preceded by: Joseph Binette
- Succeeded by: Louis-Mathias Auger

Ontario MPP
- In office 1911–1923
- Preceded by: Georges Pharand
- Succeeded by: Edmond Proulx
- Constituency: Prescott

Personal details
- Born: March 19, 1879
- Died: February 9, 1934 (aged 54) Notary
- Party: Liberal
- Spouse: Marie Emilia Chevrier (m. 1910)

Gustave Évanturel (March 19, 1879 – February 9, 1934) was an Ontario notary and political figure. He represented Prescott in the Legislative Assembly of Ontario from 1911 to 1923 as a Liberal and Independent Liberal and in the House of Commons of Canada as a Liberal member in 1925.

He was born in Ottawa in 1879, the son of François-Eugène-Alfred Évanturel and Louisa Lee, and educated at the Collège Bourget in Rigaud, Quebec and the Université Laval. In 1910, he married Marie Emilia Chevrier. He was a notary public based in Alfred and president of a mutual life assurance company, L'Alliance Nationale. He also was employed in the Privy Council Department. Évanturel was a strong supporter of bilingual schools in the province. He was elected to the House of Commons in 1925, but was unsuccessful in attempts at reelection in 1926 and 1929. He died in Alfred at the age of 54.

1925 Canadian federal election: Prescott
Party	Candidate	Votes
Liberal	Gustave Évanturel	4,198
Independent Liberal	Joseph-Napoléon Coupal	2,519
Conservative	Hiram Horton Kirby	2,387

1926 Canadian federal election: Prescott
Party	Candidate	Votes
Independent Liberal	Louis-Mathias Auger	3,846
Liberal	Gustave Évanturel	3,134
Conservative	Hiram Horton Kirby	2,504
Independent	Raoul Labrosse	635

By-election: On Mr. Auger's resignation, 29 August 1929: Prescott
Party	Candidate	Votes
Liberal	Élie-Oscar Bertrand	5,152
Independent Liberal	Gustave Gustave Évanturel	3,562
