= Très-Saint-Rédempteur =

- Municipality
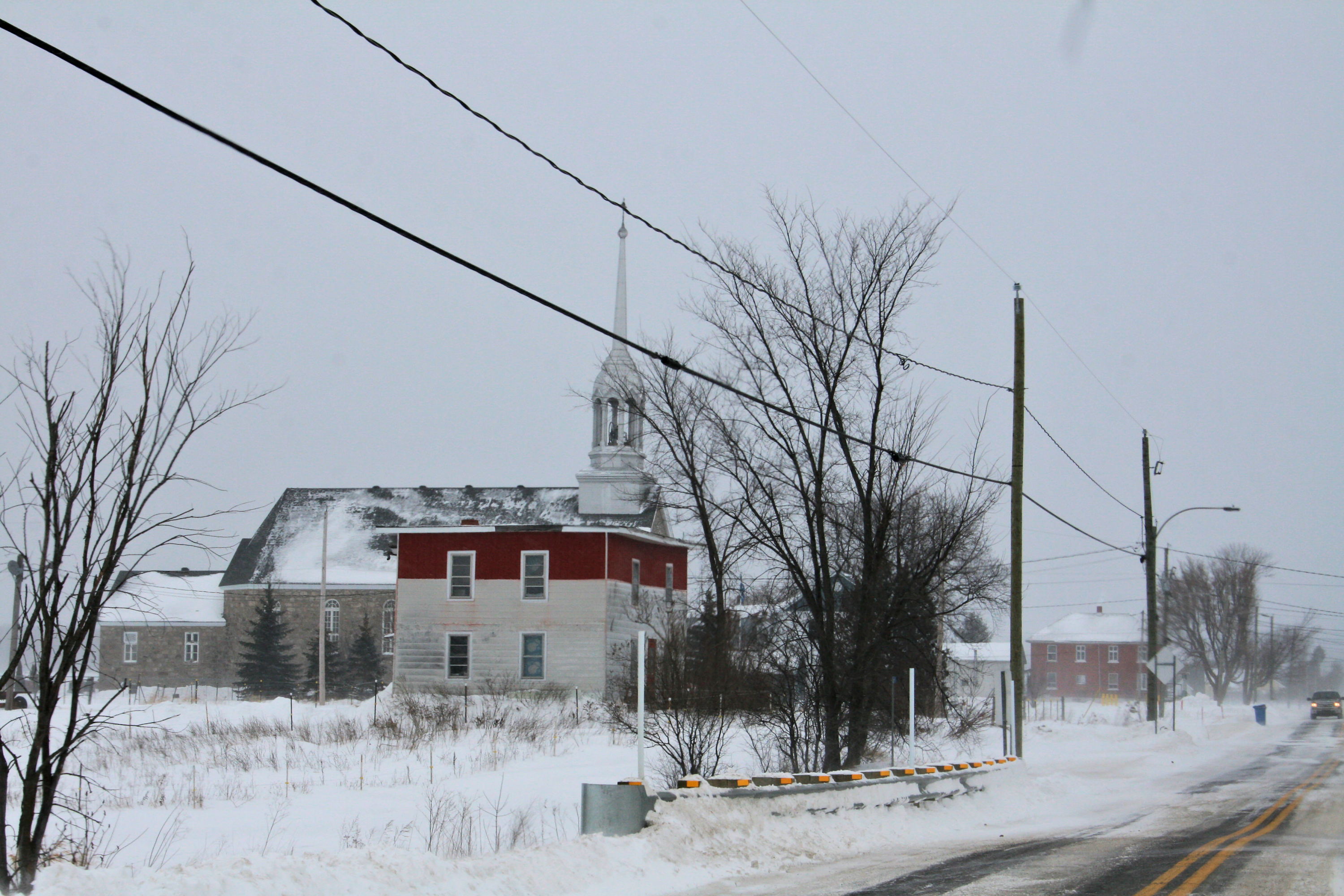

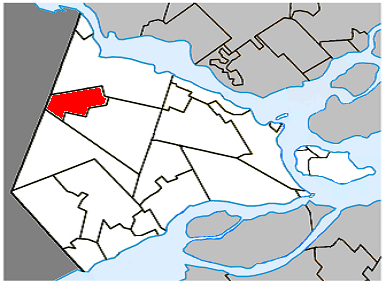
- Location within Vaudreuil-Soulanges RCM

- Location in southern Quebec
- Coordinates: 45°26′N 74°23′W
- Country: Canada
- Province: Quebec
- Region: Montérégie
- RCM: Vaudreuil-Soulanges
- Constituted: 30 December 1880
- Named for: Jesus' saving mission

Government
  - Mayor: Julie Lemieux
  - Federal riding: Salaberry—Suroît
  - Prov. riding: Soulanges

Area
  - Total: 26.20 km^{2} (10.12 sq mi)
  - Land: 26.06 km^{2} (10.06 sq mi)

Population (2021)
  - Total: 978
  - Density: 37.5/km^{2} (97/sq mi)
  - Pop 2016-2021: ▲8.9%
  - Dwellings: 389
- Time zone: UTC−5 (EST)
  - Summer (DST): UTC−4 (EDT)
- Postal code(s): J0P 1P1
- Area codes: 450 and 579
- Highways: R-325
- Website: tressaintredempteur.ca

Très-Saint-Rédempteur (French pronunciation: [tʁɛ sɛ̃ ʁedɑ̃ptœʁ], lit. 'Most Holy Redeemer') is a municipality located in the Montérégie region of Quebec, Canada, along the border with Ontario. The population as of the Canada 2021 Census was 978. The municipality includes the town of Saint-Redempteur, and lies south of Rigaud along Route 325.

The local economy is based almost exclusively on agriculture.

== History ==
In 1732 the territory was conceded to François-Pierre and Pierre de Rigaud de Vaudreuil. In 1801 M. McDonnel built a mill that became the center of the village. In 1880, the Parish Municipality of Très Saint Rédempteur was created out of territory ceded by the Parish Municipalities of Sainte-Magdeleine-de-Rigaud and Sainte Marthe. In 1882, its post office opened, called Saint-Rédempteur, and closed in 1969.

On January 30, 2010, the parish municipality changed its statutes to become a (regular) municipality.

== Demographics ==
Canada census – Très-Saint-Rédempteur community profile

	2021	2016	2011
Population	978 (+8.9% from 2016)	898 (4.1% from 2011)	863 (+17.7% from 2006)
Land area	26.06 km^{2} (10.06 sq mi)	26.05 km^{2} (10.06 sq mi)	26.10 km^{2} (10.08 sq mi)
Population density	37.5/km^{2} (97/sq mi)	34.5/km^{2} (89/sq mi)	33.1/km^{2} (86/sq mi)
Median age	44.0 (M: 44.4, F: 43.6)	41.8 (M: 43.2, F: 40.2)	41.0 (M: 41.5, F: 39.9)
Private dwellings	389 (total)	371 (total)	337 (total)
Median household income	$87,000	$72,448	$62,314

References: 2021 2016 2011

Historical Census Data - Très-Saint-Rédempteur, Quebec

Year	Pop.	±%
1881	610	—
1891	526	−13.8%
1901	442	−16.0%
1911	401	−9.3%
1921	368	−8.2%
1931	358	−2.7%
1941	385	+7.5%
1951	309	−19.7%
1956	291	−5.8%
1961	332	+14.1%
1966	335	+0.9%

Year	Pop.	±%
1971	346	+3.3%
1976	436	+26.0%
1981	417	−4.4%
1986	483	+15.8%
1991	570	+18.0%
1996	622	+9.1%
2001	598	−3.9%
2006	733	+22.6%
2011	863	+17.7%
2016	898	+4.1%
2021	978	+8.9%

Source: Statistics Canada

=== Language ===
Canada Census Mother Tongue - Très-Saint-Rédempteur, Quebec
Census	Total	French			English			French & English			Other		
Year	Responses	Count	Trend	Pop %	Count	Trend	Pop %	Count	Trend	Pop %	Count	Trend	Pop %
2021	980	775	▲4.0%	79.1%	140	▲27.3%	14.3%	25	▲150.0%	2.6%	40	▲33.3%	4.1%
2016	900	745	▲5.7%	82.8%	110	▼4.3%	12.2%	10	▲100.0%	1.1%	30	▼14.3%	3.3%
2011	860	705	▲14.6%	82.0%	115	▲4.5%	13.4%	5	▲ n/a%	0.6%	35	▲250.0%	4.1%
2006	735	615	▲26.8%	83.7%	110	▲46.7%	15.0%	0	▼100.0%	0.0%	10	0.0%	1.4%
2001	595	485	▼4.9%	81.5%	75	▼21.1%	12.6%	25	▲ n/a%	4.2%	10	▼33.3%	1.7%
1996	620	510	n/a	82.3%	95	n/a	15.3%	0	n/a	0.0%	15	n/a	2.4%

== Government ==
List of former mayors:

- John McCabe (1881–1896, 1897–1903)
- François Damien Tessier dit Lavigne (1896–1897)
- Joseph Jean Baptiste Sabourin (1903–1911)
- Ludger Cadieux (1911–1919)
- Joseph Antoine Braseau (1919–1923)
- Pierre Paul Sabourin (1923–1929)
- Joseph Edmond Eugène Sabourin (1929–1931)
- Joseph Wilfrid Sabourin (1931–1935)
- Joseph Jean Baptiste Eucharis Brazeau (1935–1939)
- Joseph Trefflé Ernest Sabourin (1939–1944)
- J. Alphonse Marleau (1944)
- Joseph Henri Paul Sabourin (1944–1945)
- Joseph Antoine Sabourin (1945–1957)
- Joseph Oswald Dasise Sabourin (1957–1965)
- Joseph Treffle Bruno Sabourin (1965–1971)
- Louis Joseph Rojer Thauvette (1971–1979)
- Joseph Gérald Conrad Neault (1979–1982)
- Claude Sabourin (1982–1993)
- Serge Brazeau (1993–1997)
- Joseph Aimé Jean Lalonde (1997–2017)
- Julie Lemieux (2017–present)

== Education ==
Commission Scolaire des Trois-Lacs operates Francophone schools.

- École Sainte-Marthe in Sainte-Marthe

Lester B. Pearson School Board operates Anglophone schools.

- Soulanges Elementary School in Saint-Télesphore or Evergreen Elementary and Forest Hill Elementary (Junior Campus and Senior campus) in Saint-Lazare

== See also ==
- List of anglophone communities in Quebec
- List of municipalities in Quebec
