= Routhier =

Surname

Routhier is a surname. Notable people with the surname include:

- Adolphe-Basile Routhier (1839–1920), Canadian judge, author, and lyricist
- Félix Routhier (1827–1891), Ontario businessman and political figure
- Karen Routhier (born 1991), Canadian ice dancer
- Marie Routhier, the owner and designer of IQ Sportswear Inc. in Newfoundland
