= Georges Pharand =

Canadian politician

Ontario MPP
- In office 1908–1911
- Preceded by: Louis-Joseph Labrosse
- Succeeded by: Gustave Évanturel
- Constituency: Prescott

Personal details
- Born: December 2, 1868 Saint-Clet, Quebec
- Party: Conservative
- Spouse: Ariella Lapointe (m. 1891)
- Occupation: Businessman

Georges Hector Pharand (born December 2, 1868) was an Ontario businessman and political figure. He represented Prescott in the Legislative Assembly of Ontario from 1908 to 1911 as a Conservative member.

He was born in Saint-Clet, Quebec in 1868, the son of Jean-Baptiste Pharand. He married Ariella Lapointe in 1891. He was a merchant at L'Orignal, Ontario and a land agent for the Canadian Pacific Railway. He defeated Louis-Joseph Labrosse in 1908 and was defeated by Gustave Évanturel in 1911; he was also unsuccessful in the 1914 provincial election.
