= Prescott (federal electoral district) =

Former federal electoral district in Ontario, Canada

Ontario electoral district

Defunct federal electoral district
- Legislature: House of Commons
- District created: 1867
- District abolished: 1952
- First contested: 1867
- Last contested: 1949

Prescott was a federal electoral district represented in the House of Commons of Canada from 1867 to 1953. It was located in the province of Ontario. It was created by the British North America Act 1867, and consisted of the County of Prescott.

The electoral district was abolished in 1952 when it was merged into Glengarry—Prescott riding.

== Members of Parliament ==
This riding elected the following members of the House of Commons of Canada:

Parliament	Years	Member	Party
1st	1867–1872	Albert Hagar	Liberal
2nd	1872–1874	Albert Hagar	Liberal
3rd	1874–1878	Albert Hagar	Liberal
4th	1878–1882	Félix Routhier	Conservative
5th	1882–1887	Simon Labrosse	Liberal
6th	1887–1891	Simon Labrosse	Liberal
7th	1891–1891	Isidore Proulx	Liberal
7th	1891–1896	Isidore Proulx	Liberal
8th	1896–1900	Isidore Proulx	Liberal
9th	1900–1904	Isidore Proulx	Liberal
10th	1904–1908	Edmond Proulx	Liberal
11th	1908–1911	Edmond Proulx	Liberal
12th	1911–1917	Edmond Proulx	Liberal
13th	1917–1921	Edmond Proulx	Opposition (Laurier Liberals)
14th	1921–1922	Joseph Binette	Progressive
14th	1922–1925	Joseph Binette	Liberal
15th	1925–1926	Gustave Évanturel	Liberal
16th	1926–1929	Louis-Mathias Auger	Independent Liberal
16th	1929–1930	Élie-Oscar Bertrand	Liberal
17th	1930–1935	Élie-Oscar Bertrand	Liberal
18th	1935–1940	Élie-Oscar Bertrand	Liberal
19th	1940–1945	Élie-Oscar Bertrand	Liberal
20th	1945–1949	Élie-Oscar Bertrand	Liberal
21st	1949–1953	Raymond Bruneau	Independent Liberal
Riding dissolved into Glengarry—Prescott

== Election results ==
1867 Canadian federal election
Party	Candidate	Votes
Liberal	Albert Hagar	1,205
Unknown	Thomas Higginson	130

Result by municipality

Municipality	Hagar	Higginson	Total vote	Eligible voters
Longueuil Township	130	19	149	180
Hawkesbury (village)	18	0	18	174
Alfred Township	169	0	169	235
Caledonia Township	109	11	120	150
North Plantagenet Township	201	0	201	232
South Plantagenet Township	166	1	167	193
West Hawkesbury Township	147	30	177	277
East Hawkesbury Township	265	69	334	555
Total	1,205	130	1,335	1,998

1872 Canadian federal election
Party	Candidate	Votes
Liberal	Albert Hagar	acclaimed
Source: Canadian Elections Database

1874 Canadian federal election
Party	Candidate	Votes
Liberal	Albert Hagar	665
Unknown	T. White Jr.	659
Unknown	J. Boyd	292

1878 Canadian federal election
Party	Candidate	Votes
Conservative	Félix Routhier	875
Liberal	Albert Hagar	870
Unknown	Angus Urquhart	661

1882 Canadian federal election
Party	Candidate	Votes
Liberal	Simon Labrosse	1,322
Conservative	Félix Routhier	1,021

1887 Canadian federal election
Party	Candidate	Votes
Liberal	Simon Labrosse	1,414
Conservative	Félix Routhier	1,223

1891 Canadian federal election
Party	Candidate	Votes
Liberal	Isidore Proulx	1,269
Conservative	Félix Routhier	608
Unknown	E. A. Johnson	532
Unknown	David Bertrand	335

By-election: On Mr. Proulx being unseated, 15 December 1891: Prescott
Party	Candidate	Votes
Liberal	Isidore Proulx	acclaimed

1896 Canadian federal election
Party	Candidate	Votes
Liberal	Isidore Proulx	1,334
Patrons of Industry	Henry Joseph Cloran	996
Conservative	Dosithé Sabourin	902

1900 Canadian federal election
Party	Candidate	Votes
Liberal	Isidore Proulx	1,596
Liberal	Henry Joseph Cloran	1,177
Conservative	Dosithé Sabourin	1,049

1904 Canadian federal election
Party	Candidate	Votes
Liberal	Edmond Proulx	2,388
Conservative	L. Charbonneau	1,323

1908 Canadian federal election
Party	Candidate	Votes
Liberal	Edmond Proulx	2,527
Independent	Eugène-Grégoire Quesnel	1,070

1911 Canadian federal election
Party	Candidate	Votes
Liberal	Edmond Proulx	2,532
Nationalist Conservative	Eugène-Grégoire Quesnel	1,220

1917 Canadian federal election
Party	Candidate	Votes
Opposition (Laurier Liberals)	Edmond Proulx	3,743
Government (Unionist)	Andrew Richard Metcalfe	1,439

1921 Canadian federal election
Party	Candidate	Votes
Progressive	Joseph Binette	3,661
Independent Liberal	Edmond Proulx	2,764
Liberal	Amédée Sabourin	2,359

1925 Canadian federal election
Party	Candidate	Votes
Liberal	Gustave Évanturel	4,198
Independent Liberal	Joseph-Napoléon Coupal	2,519
Conservative	Hiram Horton Kirby	2,387

1926 Canadian federal election
Party	Candidate	Votes
Independent Liberal	Louis-Mathias Auger	3,846
Liberal	Gustave Évanturel	3,134
Conservative	Hiram Horton Kirby	2,504
Independent	Raoul Labrosse	635

By-election: On Mr. Auger's resignation, 29 August 1929: Prescott
Party	Candidate	Votes
Liberal	Élie-Oscar Bertrand	5,152
Independent Liberal	Gustave Gustave Évanturel	3,562

1930 Canadian federal election
Party	Candidate	Votes
Liberal	Élie-Oscar Bertrand	6,572
Conservative	Edmund Alexander Mooney	2,326

1935 Canadian federal election
Party	Candidate	Votes
Liberal	Élie-Oscar Bertrand	6,034
Independent Liberal	Louis-Mathias Auger	3,620
Conservative	Joseph Saint-Denis	1,614

1940 Canadian federal election
Party	Candidate	Votes
Liberal	Élie-Oscar Bertrand	6,431
Independent Liberal	Léandre Maisonneuve	2,028
National Government	Parnell Tierney	1,819

1945 Canadian federal election
Party	Candidate	Votes
Liberal	Élie-Oscar Bertrand	6,623
Progressive Conservative	Louis-Pierre Cécile	1,753
Bloc populaire	Léandre Maisonneuve	1,500
Co-operative Commonwealth	Bernard Dupuis	408

1949 Canadian federal election
Party	Candidate	Votes
Independent Liberal	Raymond Bruneau	5,380
Liberal	Élie-Oscar Bertrand	4,148
Progressive Conservative	Joseph Saint-Denis	1,928

== See also ==
- List of Canadian electoral districts
- Historical federal electoral districts of Canada
