= Joseph St. Denis =

Canadian politician

Joseph St-Denis

Ontario MPP
- In office 1929–1934
- Preceded by: Edmond Proulx
- Succeeded by: Aurélien Bélanger
- Constituency: Prescott

Personal details
- Born: January 14, 1870 St. Eugene, Ontario
- Died: April 8, 1966 (aged 96) West Hawkesbury Township, Ontario
- Party: Independent Conservative
- Occupation: Businessman

Joseph Alfred Saint-Denis (January 14, 1870 – April 8, 1966) was an Ontario farmer, businessman and political figure. He represented Prescott in the Legislative Assembly of Ontario from 1929 to 1934 as an independent Conservative.

He was born in St. Eugene, Ontario in 1870, the son of Moïse Saint-Denis. He married Catherine McIntee in 1899. He served on the town council for Vankleek Hill for nine years. Saint-Denis ran unsuccessfully for the federal seat in 1935.

He died in a nursing home in 1966.
