= George Wellesley Hamilton =

Canadian politician

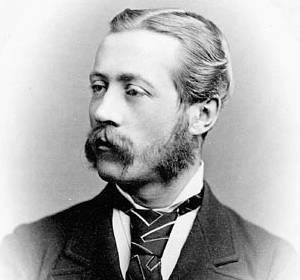

Ontario MPP
- In office 1871–1874
- Preceded by: James P. Boyd
- Succeeded by: William Harkin
- Constituency: Prescott

Personal details
- Born: 1846 Hawkesbury in Canada West
- Died: 1915 (aged 68–69)
- Party: Conservative

George Wellesley Hamilton (1846–1915) was an Ontario political figure. He represented Prescott in the Legislative Assembly of Ontario as a Conservative member from 1871 to 1874.

He was born in Hawkesbury in Canada West in 1846, the grandson of George Hamilton. He studied at Bishop's College in Lennoxville, Trinity College in Toronto and Oriel College at Oxford. He served as a lieutenant in the local militia.

== Electoral history ==
1871 Ontario general election: Prescott
Party	Candidate	Votes	%
Conservative	George Wellesley Hamilton	853	54.26
Liberal	James P. Boyd	719	45.74
Turnout		1,572	75.61
Eligible voters		2,079	
Election voided
Source: Elections Ontario

Ontario provincial by-election, December 1871: Prescott Previous election voided
Party	Candidate	Votes
Conservative	George Wellesley Hamilton	Acclaimed
Source: History of the Electoral Districts, Legislatures and Ministries of the Province of Ontario
