= Thomas Higginson (Canadian politician) =

Thomas Higginson (September 10, 1810 – November 10, 1896) was an Ontario businessman and political figure. He represented Prescott in the Legislative Assembly of the Province of Canada from 1863 to 1867.

The son of John Higginson and Eliza Sheriff, he was born in Ireland in 1810 and came to Upper Canada in 1819. In 1831, he married Marcella Brown (some sources say Margery Browne). He worked for several years as a bookkeeper for the Hamilton Brothers lumber company. Higginson served on the municipal council for the village of Hawkesbury. He was postmaster at Hawkesbury and an agent for the Canada Life Assurance Company. Higginson ran unsuccessfully against Albert Hagar in 1867 for the Prescott seat in the House of Commons.

1867 Canadian federal election: Prescott
| Party | Candidate | Votes |
|---|---|---|
| Liberal | Albert Hagar | 1,205 |
| Unknown | Thomas Higginson | 130 |
