= Rigaud River =

Coordinates: 45.47925°N 74.39094°W

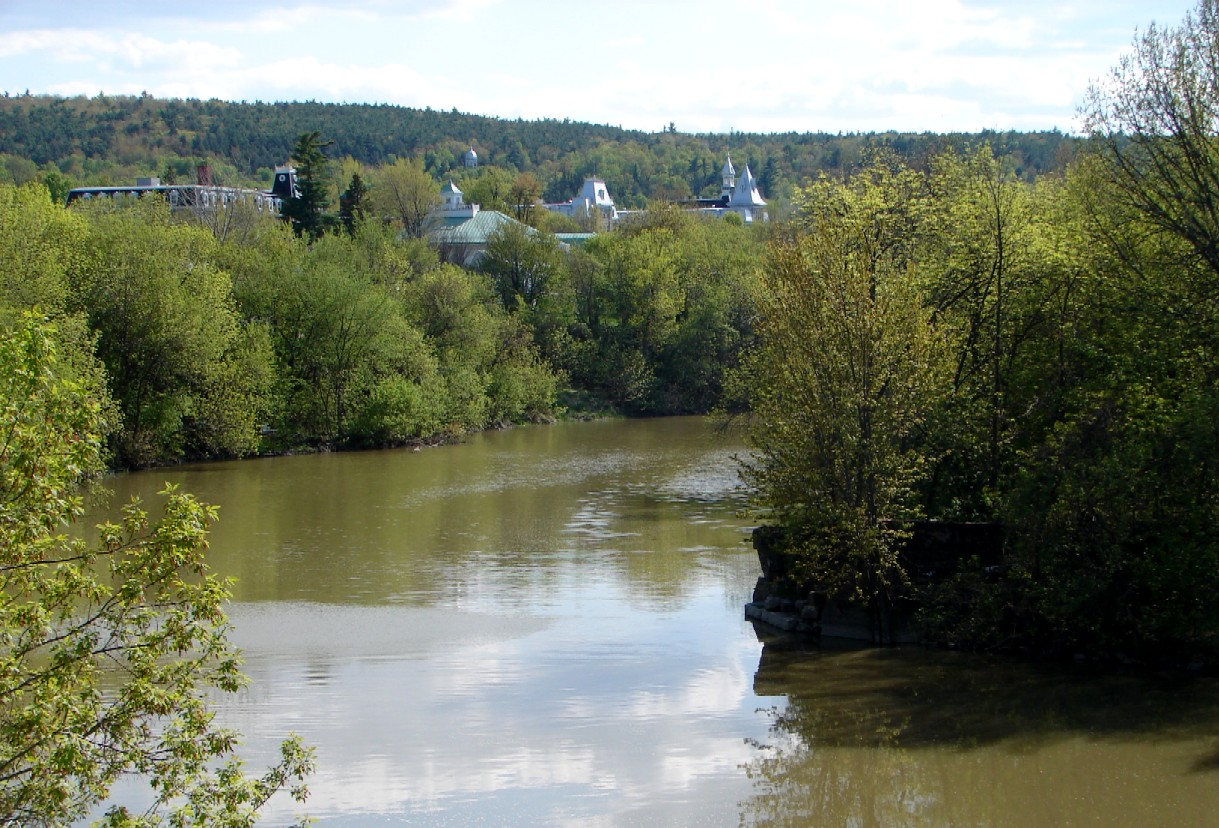
Rigaud River in the town of Rigaud

The Rigaud River is a river in eastern Ontario and western Quebec. It rises south of Vankleek Hill, Ontario and flows east, entering the province of Quebec. It joins with the East Rigaud River which rises to the south of it and flows north to empty into the Ottawa River at Rigaud, Quebec.

The river was named after Pierre François de Rigaud, Marquis de Vaudreuil-Cavagnal, the last governor of New France.

== See also ==
- List of rivers of Ontario
