= Élie-Oscar Bertrand =

Canadian politician (1894–1980)

Élie-Oscar Bertrand (March 3, 1894 – October 21, 1980) was a businessman and political figure in Ontario, Canada. Bertrand represented Prescott in the House of Commons of Canada as a Liberal member from 1929 to 1949.

He was born in L'Orignal, Ontario in 1894, the son of Louis Bertrand. He married Armande Scott in 1915. He was a merchant at L'Orignal and served as clerk for the municipal council and was mayor from 1922 to 1929. Bertrand was first elected to the House of Commons in a 1929 by-election held after Louis-Mathias Auger resigned his seat. He held the Prescott seat until he was defeated in 1949 by Raymond Bruneau. Shortly afterwards, Bertrand was named to the Canadian Farm Loan Board, a predecessor to Farm Credit Canada, and served until 1960.

By-election: On Mr. Auger's resignation, 29 August 1929: Prescott
Party	Candidate	Votes
Liberal	Élie-Oscar Bertrand	5,152
Independent Liberal	Gustave Gustave Évanturel	3,562

1930 Canadian federal election: Prescott
Party	Candidate	Votes
Liberal	Élie-Oscar Bertrand	6,572
Conservative	Edmund Alexander Mooney	2,326

1935 Canadian federal election: Prescott
Party	Candidate	Votes
Liberal	Élie-Oscar Bertrand	6,034
Independent Liberal	Louis-Mathias Auger	3,620
Conservative	Joseph Saint-Denis	1,614

1940 Canadian federal election: Prescott
Party	Candidate	Votes
Liberal	Élie-Oscar Bertrand	6,431
Independent Liberal	Léandre Maisonneuve	2,028
National Government	Parnell Tierney	1,819

1945 Canadian federal election: Prescott
Party	Candidate	Votes
Liberal	Élie-Oscar Bertrand	6,623
Progressive Conservative	Louis-Pierre Cécile	1,753
Bloc populaire	Léandre Maisonneuve	1,500
Co-operative Commonwealth	Bernard Dupuis	408

1949 Canadian federal election: Prescott
Party	Candidate	Votes
Independent Liberal	Raymond Bruneau	5,380
Liberal	Élie-Oscar Bertrand	4,148
Progressive Conservative	Joseph Saint-Denis	1,928

Parliament of Canada
Preceded by Louis-Mathias Auger	Member of Parliament for Prescott; 1929-1949	Succeeded by Raymond Bruneau
