= Raymond Bruneau =

Canadian politician

Member of Parliament for Prescott
- In office 1949–1953
- Preceded by: Élie-Oscar Bertrand

Member of Parliament for Glengarry—Prescott
- In office 1953–1957
- Succeeded by: Osie Villeneuve

Personal details
- Born: June 12, 1917 Hawkesbury, Ontario
- Died: July 5, 1971 (aged 54) Ottawa, Ontario
- Party: Independent Liberal, Liberal Party of Canada
- Spouse: Marie-Thérèse O'Rourke
- Profession: translator

Raymond Bruneau (June 12, 1917 – July 5, 1971) was an Ontario translator and political figure. He was a member of the House of Commons of Canada representing Prescott and defeating the 24-year incumbent Liberal MP, Élie-Oscar Bertrand, to sit as an Independent Liberal from 1949 to 1953. He sat for Glengarry—Prescott as a Liberal from 1953 to 1957.

He was born in Hawkesbury, Ontario in 1917, the son of Joseph Bruneau. He studied political science and constitutional law at the University of Ottawa. In 1944, he married Marie-Thérèse O'Rourke. Bruneau worked in Ottawa as a translator in the federal public service. He was unsuccessful in attempts at reelection in 1957, 1958 and 1963.

1949 Canadian federal election: Prescott
Party	Candidate	Votes
Independent Liberal	Raymond Bruneau	5,380
Liberal	Élie-Oscar Bertrand	4,148
Progressive Conservative	Joseph Saint-Denis	1,928
