= William Harkin =

Canadian politician

Ontario MPP
- In office 1875–1881
- Preceded by: George Wellesley Hamilton
- Succeeded by: Albert Hagar
- Constituency: Prescott

Personal details
- Born: 1831 Hawkesbury, Upper Canada
- Died: 1881 (aged 49–50) Toronto, Ontario
- Party: Conservative
- Spouse: Eliza McDonell (m. 1859)
- Occupation: Doctor

William Harkin (1831 – 1881) was an Ontario medical doctor and political figure. He represented Prescott in the Legislative Assembly of Ontario from 1875 to 1881 as a Conservative member.

He was born in Hawkesbury, Ontario in 1831, the son of Irish immigrants. He studied medicine at McGill University and qualified to practice in 1858. In 1859, he married Eliza McDonell. He served as reeve for Vankleek Hill. Harkin died in office in 1881.

His son James served as Canada's first commissioner of national parks.

== Electoral history ==
1875 Ontario general election: Prescott
Party	Candidate	Votes	%	±%
Conservative	William Harkin	988	62.57	+8.31
Liberal	R.P. Pattee	591	37.43	−8.31
Total valid votes		1,579	59.61	−16.01
Eligible voters		2,649		
Conservative hold		Swing		+8.31
Source: Elections Ontario

1879 Ontario general election: Prescott
Party	Candidate	Votes	%	±%
Conservative	William Harkin	900	47.62	−14.95
Liberal	Mr. Ryan	622	32.91	−4.52
Independent	S. Johnson	232	12.28	
Independent	Mr. Vanbridger	136	7.20	
Total valid votes		1,890	58.77	−0.84
Eligible voters		3,216		
Conservative hold		Swing		−5.22
Source: Elections Ontario

== Bibliography ==
- Histoire des Comtes Unis de Prescott et de Russell, L. Brault (1963)
