= Rigaud, Quebec =

Rigaud
- City
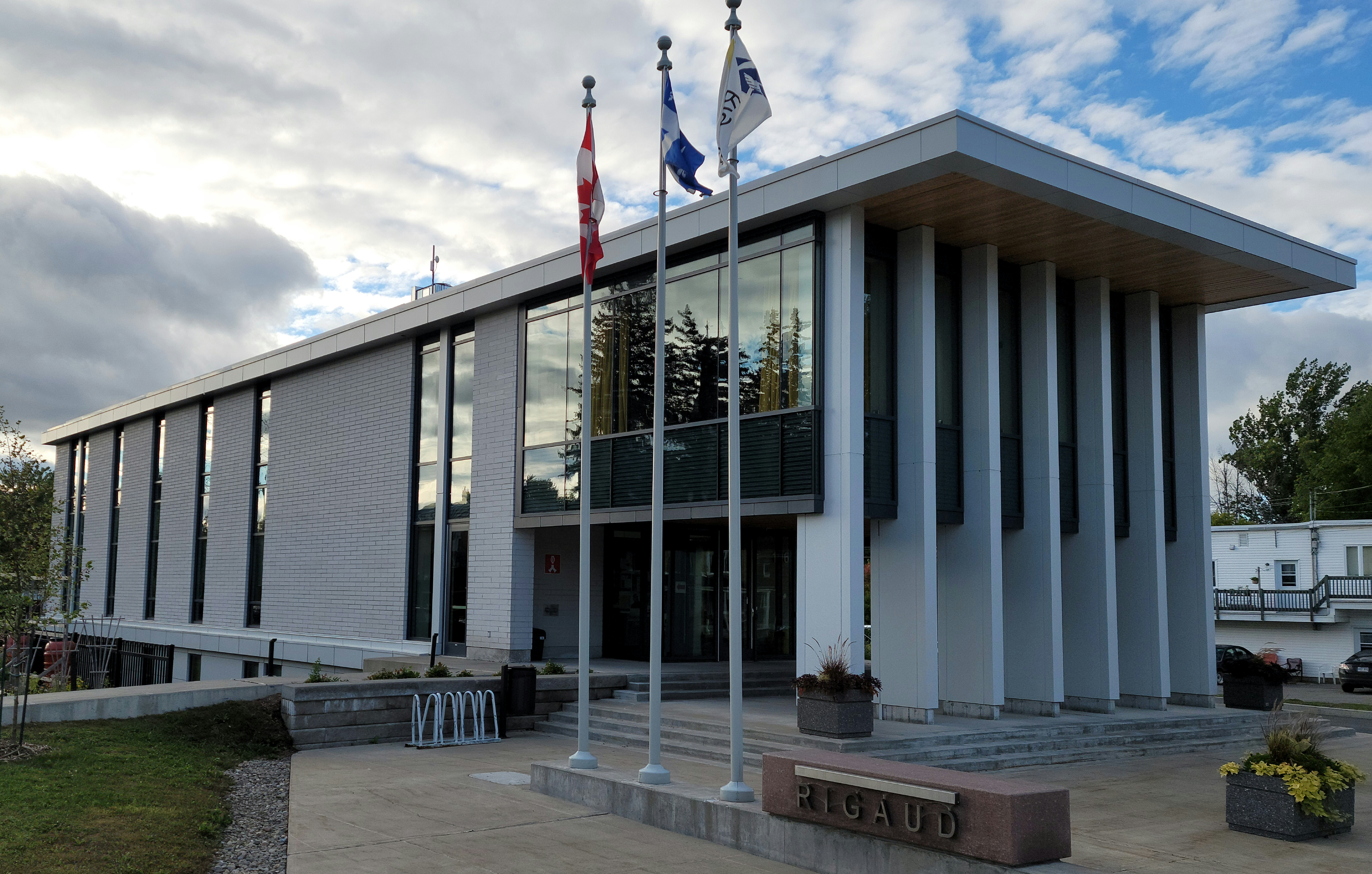
- City hall of Rigaud

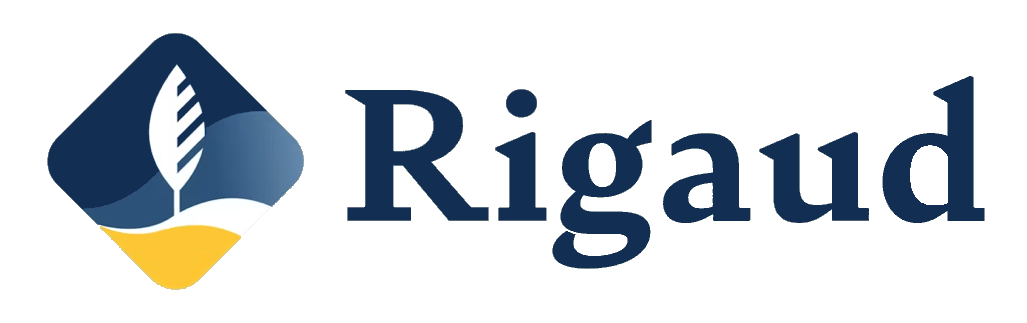
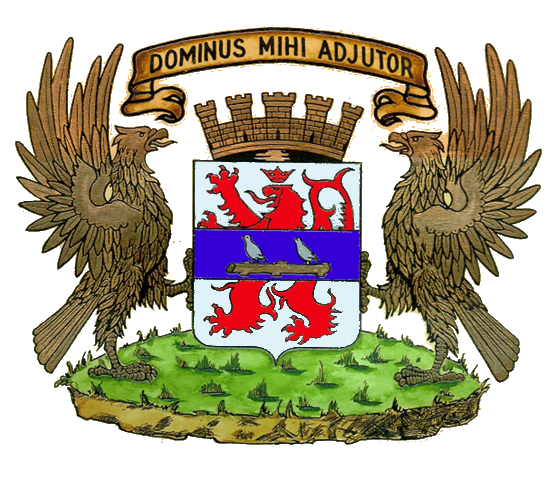
- Seal Coat of arms

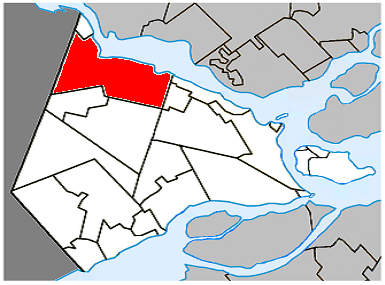
- Location within Vaudreuil-Soulanges RCM

- Location in southern Quebec
- Coordinates: 45°29′N 74°18′W
- Country: Canada
- Province: Quebec
- Region: Montérégie
- RCM: Vaudreuil-Soulanges
- Constituted: 29 November 1995

Government
  - Mayor: Charles Meunier
  - Federal riding: Vaudreuil
  - Prov. riding: Soulanges

Area
  - City: 114.00 km^{2} (44.02 sq mi)
  - Land: 99.20 km^{2} (38.30 sq mi)
  - Urban: 2.49 km^{2} (0.96 sq mi)

Population (2021)
  - City: 7,854
  - Density: 79.2/km^{2} (205/sq mi)
  - Urban: 3,038
  - Urban density: 1,221.1/km^{2} (3,163/sq mi)
  - Pop 2011–2016: ▲1.0%
  - Dwellings: 3,496
- Time zone: UTC−5 (EST)
  - Summer (DST): UTC−4 (EDT)
- Postal code(s): J0P 1P0
- Area codes: 450 and 579
- Highways A-40 (TCH): R-325; R-342
- Website: ville.rigaud.qc.ca

Rigaud (French pronunciation: [ʁigo]) is a city in southwestern Quebec, Canada, in the Vaudreuil-Soulanges Regional County Municipality in Vallée-du-Haut-Saint-Laurent region. It is located at the junction of the Ottawa River and the Rigaud River, about 70 kilometres (43 mi) west of downtown Montreal and 130 kilometres (81 mi) east of Ottawa. The population as of the Canada 2021 Census was 7,854.

== History ==
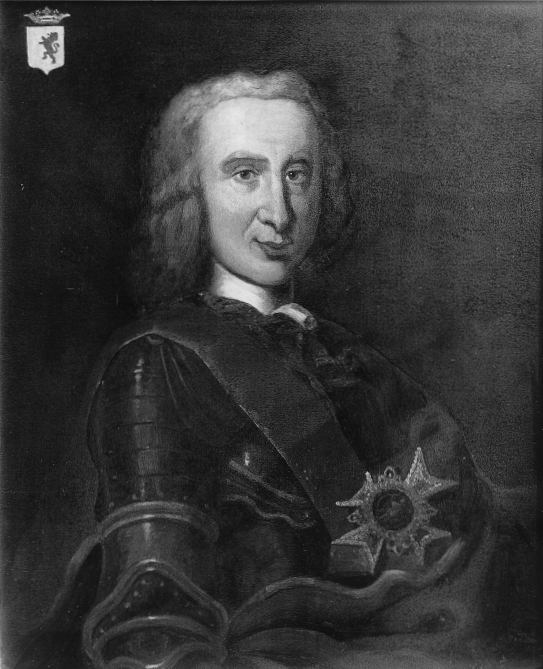
François-Pierre Rigaud de Vaudreuil

Rigaud is located on the traditional territory of the Algonquins, who fled the region before the arrival of the French, due to violent attacks by the Iroquois. Étienne Brûlé was the first European to travel on the Ottawa River, in 1615.

The Seigneury of Rigaud was granted in 1732 to the brothers Pierre and François-Pierre de Rigaud de Vaudreuil, governors in New France, and was sold in 1763 to Michel Chartier de Lotbinière, who in turn gave the seigneury to his son in 1771.

The seigneury saw its first settlers in 1783. At the beginning of the 19th century, the locality developed rapidly as an accommodation relay for loggers, and as a loading point for timber and cereals. In 1802, the Mission of Sainte-Magdeleine-de-Rigaud was founded, which became a parish in 1830. In 1835, the Rigaud Post Office opened. In 1845, the Municipality of Rigaud was formed, but abolished in 1847. It was reestablished in 1855 as the Parish Municipality of Sainte-Magdeleine-de-Rigaud (or Sainte-Madeleine-de-Rigaud).

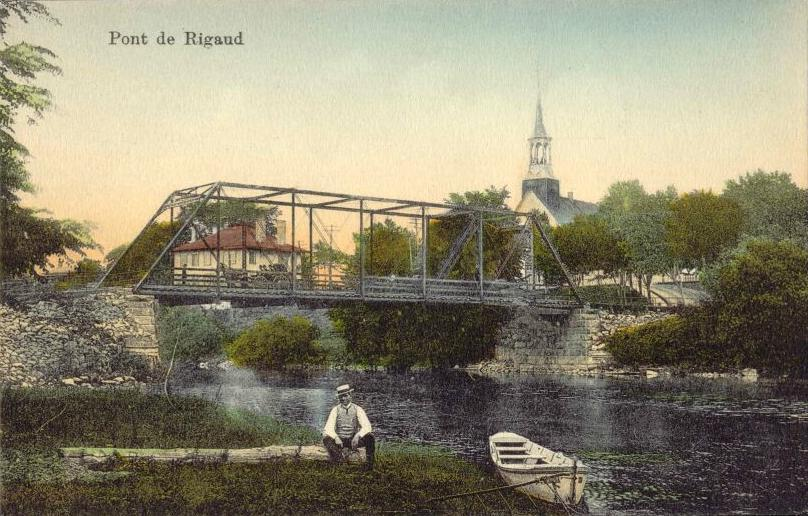
Rigaud Bridge c. 1910

In the second half of the 19th century, the establishment of several religious institutions and the development of the railways contribute to local development. In 1880, the village itself split off from the rural parish municipality to form the Village Municipality of Rigaud. That same year, Pointe-Fortune and Très-Saint-Rédempteur were also created out of territory of Sainte-Madeleine-de-Rigaud.

At the beginning of the 20th century, Rigaud was an important regional center and becomes administrative centre of the riding of Vaudreuil. Rigaud changed status to city in March 1911.

On November 29, 1995, the City of Rigaud and the Parish Municipality of Sainte-Madeleine-de-Rigaud rejoined to form the new Municipality of Rigaud, which changed status to city again on August 22, 2015.

In April 2023 there was a storm of black ice that affected the residents of the territory. People numbering 1872 lost electricity because of that storm.

== Geography ==
Rigaud is located at the northwestern part of the Suroît region, on the south shore of Lake of Two Mountains, a widening of the Ottawa River, leading north towards the Laurentians region. It extends along the Rigaud River back from Ottawa, and several hamlets are built for certain riparian areas of the lake, others as old industrial centers in the plains, or more recently, rural residential developments. The western limit of the municipality constitutes the interprovincial border with the United Counties of Prescott and Russell, in Ontario.

Dairy and cattle farms dominate the western part of the territory, while the equine farms propagate in the east and north, and that several sugar bushes are exploited on the mountain. In addition to this agricultural activity, there are sand pits, as well as resort and leisure areas, and particularly winter and hiking sports and camping, as well as commercial and service areas serving both the surrounding population and traffic. transit . The population of Rigaud is around 7,854 inhabitants, as per the 2021 Census. Rigaud remains a regional community, unlike neighboring cities to the east, which have been integrated into the Montreal Metropolitan Area.

Neighbouring municipalities are Hudson, Vaudreuil-Dorion, Sainte-Marthe, Très-Saint-Rédempteur, East Hawkesbury, and Pointe-Fortune. The municipality located across Ottawa River is Saint-André-d'Argenteuil. The geographic location of Rigaud, at the head of the Ottawa River and between the Montreal and Ottawa metropolitan areas, has contributed largely to its economic development throughout its history.

The municipality covers a total area of 113.71 square kilometres (43.90 sq mi), of which 99.23 square kilometres (38.31 sq mi) are terrestrial. The relief is composed, on the North side, of the Ottawa River plain, which is part of the St. Lawrence Lowlands and, on the South side, of the Rigaud Mountain. The plain is partly agricultural, partly wooded and partly urbanized. It has three subspaces: wetlands and lowlands, which are prone to flooding as they are located along the Ottawa River; the indentations and embankments of the Rigaud and Raquette rivers; and, the flat terrace, which makes up most of the territory. The soils of the plain consist of alluvial deposits, and Pointe à la Raquette is particularly alluvial and muddy.

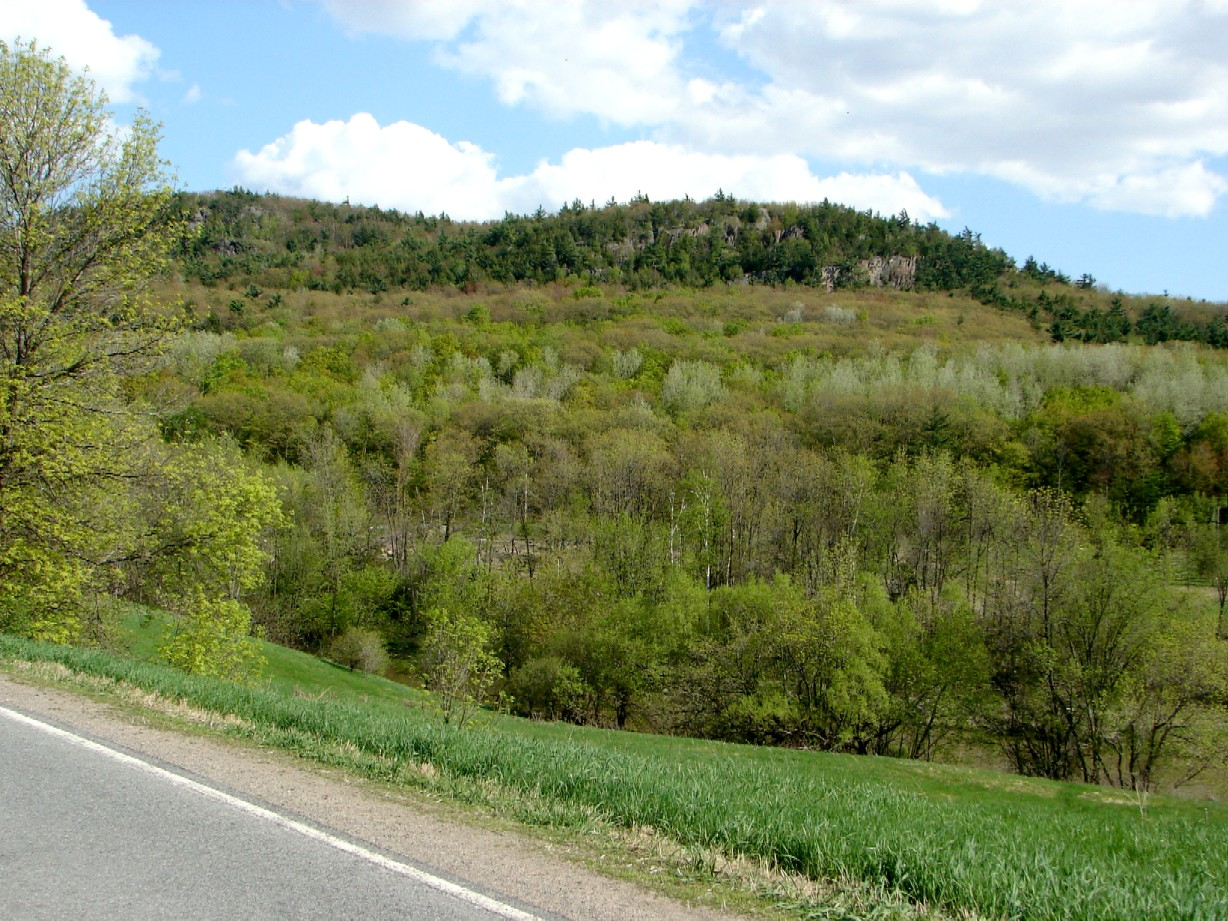
Rigaud Mountain

Lake of Two Mountains and the Rigaud mountain dominate the landscape. The Rigaud mountain covers 47 square kilometres (18 sq mi), and is divided into three physiographic units: the escarpment to the north-west; the central plateau modulated by local peaks; and the lower slopes to the east and north.

The forest mainly composed of rocky surface and loam, and approximately a third of its area is rocky and rugged . This bottom moraine consists of pieces of rock that a glacier has torn from its bed, the bedrock of the Canadian Shield, chunks it shrunk and rounded as it rolled over them, carrying them and dropping them in this bowl, a few thousand years ago, at the end of the Wisconsin Ice Age. 8,500 years ago, when the lowlands of the St.Lawrence rose directly to the Champlain Sea, the Rigaud stadium was characterized by the powerful rivers which drained water from the present-day Great Lakes, transporting immense quantities of sand, thus forming the terraces of Rigaud and the plateau of Saint-Lazare. The lithology of Rigaud is characterized by three zones:

- a Cambrian substrate composed of sandstone, conglomerate, limestone and dolomite in the waterfront area from Rigaud to Vaudreuil;
- dolomite and sandstone area of Ordovicien, less than the circumference of the Rigaud River;
- and the granite of the Proterozoic on Rigaud mountain.

The Rigaud Mountain is home to one of the only two ancient forests of Suroît. The forest is generally intermediate there, with mature areas on the northern flank. Areas of young forest also line the shore of the Ottawa River. The forest stand is characteristic of the bioclimatic domain of the maple hickory stand. The hill is populated mainly with maple and beech groves. The exceptional forest ecosystems foster an extensive catalogue, of which a hemlock grove/red spruce forest, a red oak grove, a moist cedar forest with fir, a maple hickory and a maple linden forest on Rigaud mountain, as well as a silver maple with red ash, a maple hickory, and a group of oval hickory around the edges of Brazeau and Quesnel bays. The Rigaud Mountain is home to about 250 white-tailed deer, as well as to the spotted salamander. It is also home to 250 species of birds, including the great woodpecker, the wild turkey, the ruffed grouse, as well as to owls. A large number of aquatic and migratory birds also live in wetlands, particularly on the shores of the Brazeau and Rigaud bays, as well as at Pointe à la Raquette.

=== Land use ===
The plain offers favorable conditions for agriculture, infrastructure and urban development. Rigaud Mountain, because of its slope and the poor quality of its soil, has kept its forest cover, although it has had extensive residential and recreational development. More than a third of the territory of Rigaud is forest.

Farmland in Rigaud is mainly to the west, on the left bank of the Rigaud River, and primarily used for market gardening. The valley of the Rivière à la Raquette to the east is sparsely populated in the north due to the presence of swamps in the point; the land is used for various purposes including a sand pit, a transit service center, a campground and small horse farms. Rigaud mountain, along the crest of Chemin Saint-George and at the top of Rue Bourget, offers a view of the Ottawa River and the Laurentians. It is a wooded area, with hiking trails, a few isolated clusters of new country residences and old cabins, as well as recreational and tourism operations.

The village of Rigaud, which roughly corresponds to the old town of Rigaud, is made up of old and of traditional Quebec architecture. It is organized around the primary roads, Saint-Jean-Baptiste and Saint-Pierre streets, as well as Saint-Viateur Street. It includes almost all the businesses, shops, services and institutions of the municipality. The industrial companies are located in three industrial parks on the edge of the urban core, namely the industrial parks of the Cooperative, Doctor-Oscar-Gendron and J.-Marc-Séguin.

The cadastre and the arterial road network of Rigaud are structured around nine original concessions of the seigneury of Rigaud. Several hamlets and built-up areas dot the countryside:

- La Baie, on the edge of Rigaud Bay to the west of the village;
- Rigaud-sur-le-Lac (Bas-de-la-Rivière), on the Ottawa River at the mouth of the Rigaud River, consists of old chalets, many of which have been transformed into residences, and is experiencing recent residential development;
- Dragon (Grande Ligne), near Pointe à la Raquette on the edge of the railroad, was developed during the First World War. The toponym of the hamlet comes from the golden dragon represented on the logo of the company Northern Explosive which was established there;
- Choisy (Anse-à-la-Raquette), old and rural, is located on the edge of Anse near Hudson;
- Petit-Brûlé — Haut-de-la-Chute is a rural country sector bordering the Rigaud and Rigaud Est rivers. The soil in this area is subject to landslides;
- Mountain Ranches, made up of recent rural residential pockets on the north side of the Rigaud mountain, accessible by de la Mairie road;
- Saint-Georges, on the Rigaud mountain plateau.

== Demographics ==
Historical Census Data – Rigaud, Quebec
| Year | Pop. | ±% |
|---|---|---|
| 1996 | 6,057 | — |
| 2001 | 6,095 | +0.6% |
| 2006 | 6,780 | +11.2% |
| 2011 | 7,346 | +8.3% |
| 2016 | 7,777 | +5.9% |
| 2021 | 7,854 | +1.0% |
Source: Statistics Canada

In the 2021 Census of Population conducted by Statistics Canada, Rigaud had a population of 7,854 living in 3,311 of its 3,496 total private dwellings, a change of 1% from its 2016 population of 7,777. With a land area of 99.2 km^{2} (38.3 sq mi), it had a population density of 79.2/km^{2} (205.1/sq mi) in 2021.

Canada census – Rigaud community profile

| | 2021 | 2016 | 2011 |
| Population | 7,854 (+1.0% from 2016) | 7,777 (5.9% from 2011) | 7,346 (+8.3% from 2006) |
| Land area | 99.20 km^{2} (38.30 sq mi) | 99.23 km^{2} (38.31 sq mi) | 99.12 km^{2} (38.27 sq mi) |
| Population density | 79.2/km^{2} (205/sq mi) | 78.4/km^{2} (203/sq mi) | 74.1/km^{2} (192/sq mi) |
| Median age | 46.4 (M: 46.4, F: 46.4) | 46.3 (M: 45.7, F: 47.0) | 45.1 (M: 44.8, F: 45.4) |
| Private dwellings | 3,496 (total) | 3,525 (total) | 3,254 (total) |
| Median household income | $79,500 | $64,175 | $56,775 |

References: 2021 2016 2011

Canada Census Mother Tongue – Rigaud, Quebec
| Census | Total | French | | | English | | | French & English | | | Other | | |
| Year | Responses | Count | Trend | Pop % | Count | Trend | Pop % | Count | Trend | Pop % | Count | Trend | Pop % |
| 2021 | 7,760 | 5,465 | ▼7.7% | 70.4% | 1,580 | ▲17.5% | 20.4% | 260 | ▲108.0% | 3.4% | 410 | ▲22.4% | 5.3% |
| 2016 | 7,745 | 5,920 | ▲5.4% | 76.4% | 1,345 | ▲9.8% | 17.4% | 125 | 0.0% | 1.6% | 335 | ▲13.6% | 4.3% |
| 2011 | 7,260 | 5,615 | ▲9.7% | 77.3% | 1,225 | ▲5.6% | 16.9% | 125 | ▲127.3% | 1.7% | 295 | ▲9.3% | 4.1% |
| 2006 | 6,605 | 5,120 | ▲8.0% | 77.5% | 1,160 | ▲20.2% | 17.6% | 55 | ▼8.3% | 0.8% | 270 | ▲54.3% | 4.1% |
| 2001 | 5,940 | 4,740 | ▼1.4% | 79.8% | 965 | ▲14.2% | 16.2% | 60 | ▼14.3% | 1.0% | 175 | ▼16.7% | 3.0% |
| 1996 | 5,930 | 4,805 | n/a | 81.0% | 845 | n/a | 14.3% | 70 | n/a | 1.2% | 210 | n/a | 3.5% |

== Attractions ==
=== Rigaud Mountain ===
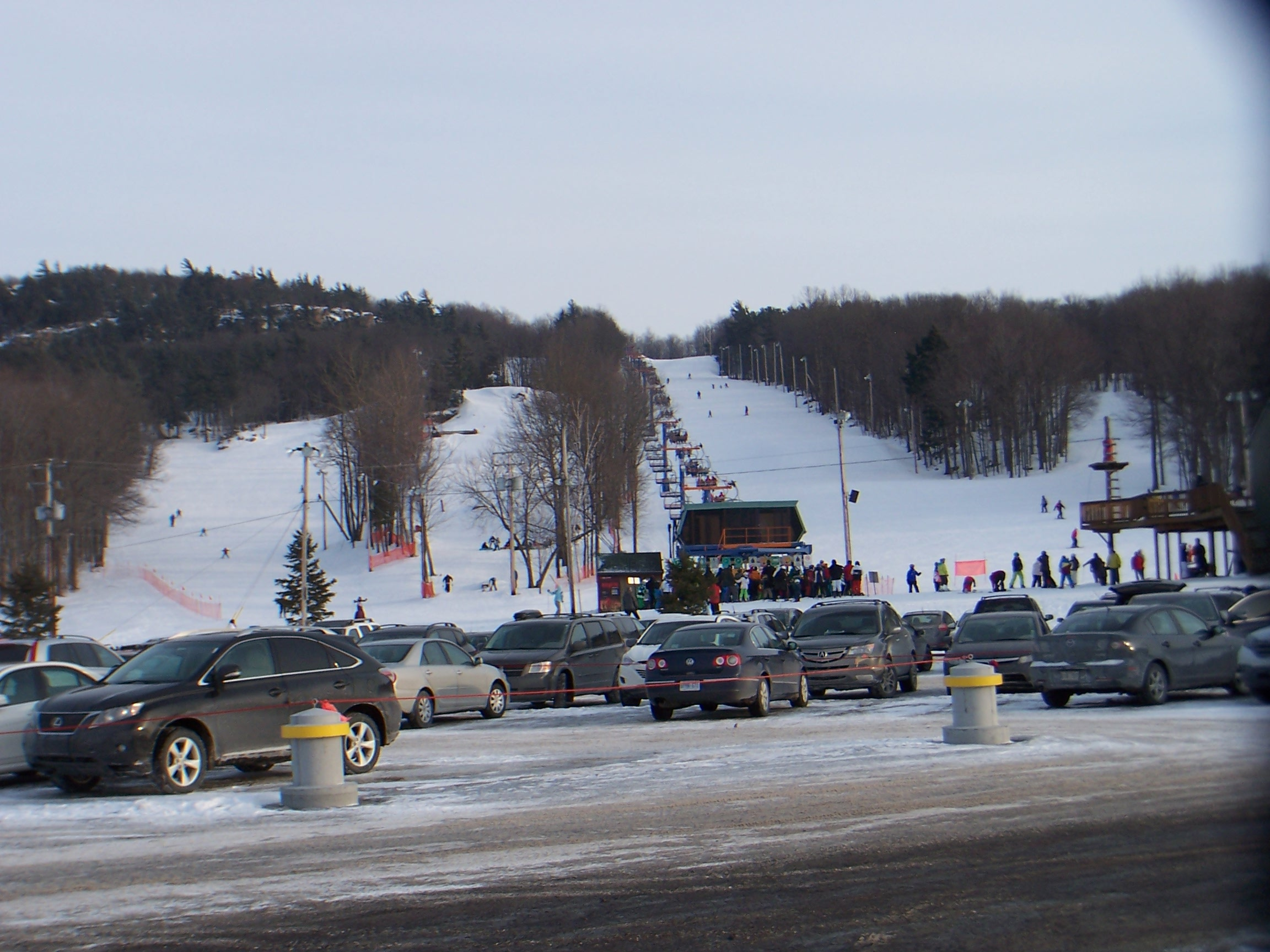
Ski Mont Rigaud

The main attraction is Mont-Rigaud, a hill with downhill ski runs (at Ski Mont Rigaud), a private school (Collège Bourget), a monastery, and a shrine dedicated to the Virgin Mary (Sanctuaire Notre-Dame-de-Lourdes). The mountain is also home to an unusual, natural rock garden known as the "champs de patates", so named because of the local legend that it was once a potato field, turned to stone by God because the farmer worked on Sunday. There is also the open yearound Sucrerie de la Montagne, a traditional sugar shack offering explanation of the maple syrup production and traditional sugaring off feast.

=== Other attractions ===
On the opposite side of the mountain is a residential community known as "Mountain Ranches." The middle to upper-middle class community features large, mostly secluded building lots in a wooded setting that draws residents because of its isolated tranquility and privacy. As such, it was the hiding place for fugitive Charlie Wilson, one of the leaders of the notorious 1963 Great train robbery in England. This area was also known for its "tree farms" in the 1960s and 1970s, providing a tax shelter for the well off, until the tax laws were later changed to require harvesting of those "tree farms". The "Pitcairn Tree Farm" was one such example.

Other attractions include its maple and blueberry products, and the local microbrewery Le Castor.

A training center for the Canada Border Services Agency is located in Rigaud.

== Government ==
List of former mayors 1880–1995:

- Alphonse Chevrier (1880–1882, 1889–1892, 1904–1907, 1908–1910)
- J. Baptiste Emedée Mongenait (1882–1889)
- Joseph Adrien Bélanger (1889)
- Charles Jean Fletcher (1892–1893, 1903–1904)
- Jean Baptiste Emery Alfred Lalonde (1893–1897)
- Joseph Archibald Duncan McDonald (1900–1903, 1904, 1910–1913)
- Benjamin Gustave Boyer (1907–1908, 1913–1920)
- Charles Laplante (1913)
- Elzéar Montpetit (1920–1923, 1924–1927)
- Joseph Louis Lafleur (1923–1924)
- Joseph Ovila Lévaque (1927–1933)
- Joseph Floribert Lefebvre (1933–1935)
- Alphonse Hector Chevrier (1935)
- Joseph Oscar Hector Gendron (1935–1948, 1951–1965)
- Ambroise Elzear Robillard (1948–1951)
- Joseph-Welly Antonio Bussière (1965–1968)
- Joseph Henri-Vital Marc Séguin (1968–1975)
- Joseph-Fernand Calixte Labbé (1975)
- Joseph Aimé Bruno Ernest Aubry (1975–1987)
- Joseph Alphée Fernand Jean Goupil (1987–1991)
- Gildor Ernest Roy (1991–1995)

List of former mayors of current city:

- Gildor Ernest Roy (1995–1996)
- Jean-Guy Faubert (1996–1999)
- Joseph Raymond Réal Brazeau (1999–2013)
- Hans Gruenwald Jr. (2013–2021)
- Marie-Claude Frigault (2021–2025)
- Charles Meunier (2025–present)

== Infrastructure ==
The Rigaud station was the former terminus of the AMT commuter train to downtown Montreal.

On 1 July 2010, service to Rigaud was discontinued, as the town was unable to pay the $300,000 annual fee to the AMT to allow service to continue to the town. After that date, the rail line ends at Hudson.

The town is served by the 61 bus from Exo La Presqu’Île.

== Education ==
Commission Scolaire des Trois-Lacs operates Francophone schools.

- École de l'Épervière
- Some areas are served by École Sainte-Marthe in Sainte-Marthe

Lester B. Pearson School Board operates Anglophone schools.

- Soulanges Elementary School in Saint-Télesphore or Evergreen Elementary and Forest Hill Elementary (Junior Campus and Senior campus) in Saint-Lazare

French-language private educational institution (Collège Bourget)

== See also ==
- List of anglophone communities in Quebec
- List of cities and towns in Quebec
