= Collège Bourget =

Private education institution in Quebec, Canada

Coordinates: 45°28′25″N 74°18′31″W

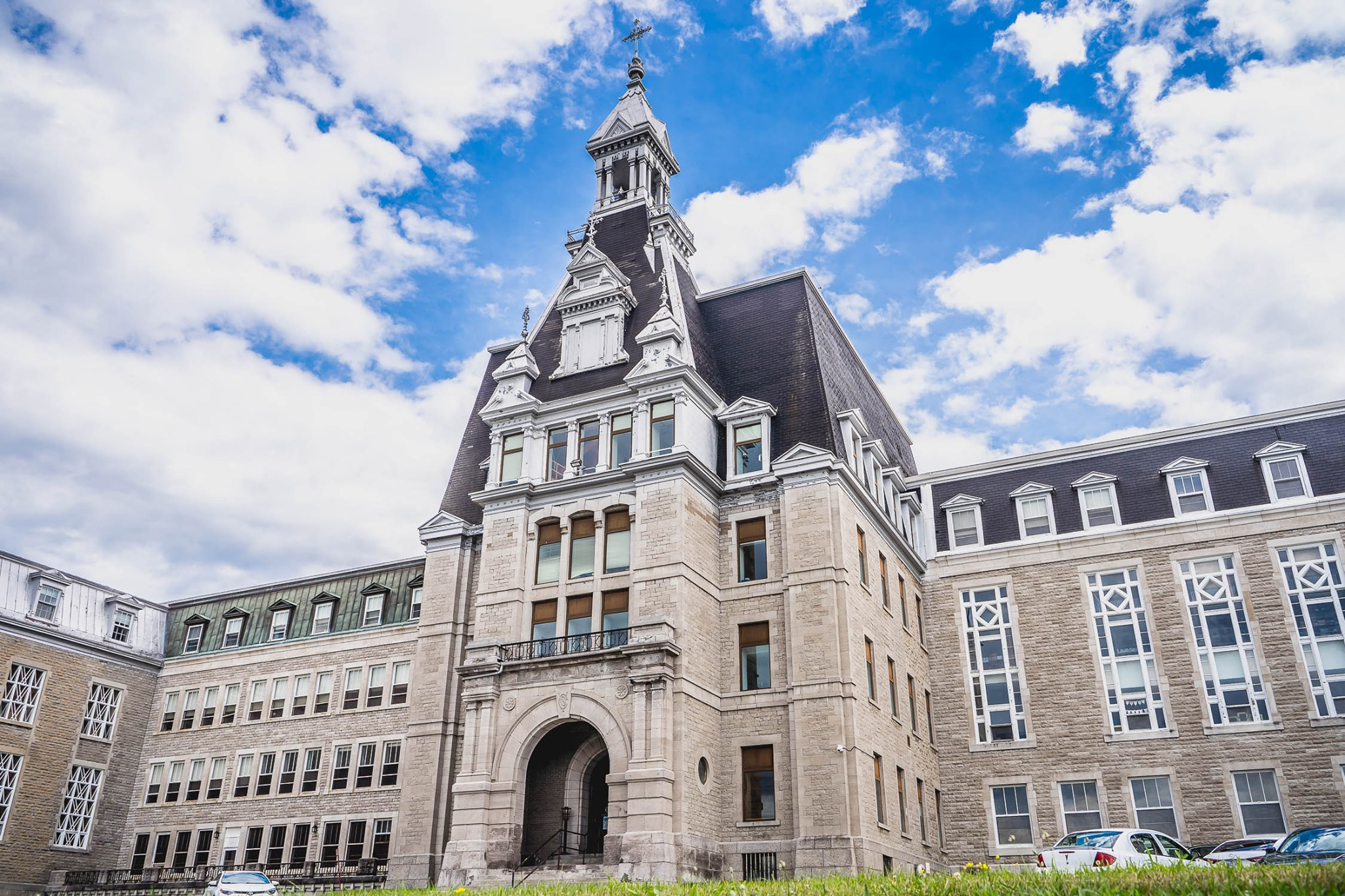
An image of Collège Bourget

Collège Bourget is a French-language private education institution in Rigaud, Quebec, Canada. Despite its former religious involvements under the Roman Catholic branch, the students are no longer obliged to practice Catholicism or any other religion. The school provides education at the preschool, primary, and secondary levels and even offers a grade 12 . Bourget welcomes about 1100 day-students and offers a boarding service for high-school students, notably from the international program.

== History ==
In 1850, parish priest Joseph Désautels founded Collège Bourget on the recommendation of the Archbishop of Montreal, Ignace Bourget. Three religious Clerics of Saint-Viateur settled in Rigaud to teach the first students in a modest setting.

== Transportation ==
Perhaps more than 90% of Bourget's students come from outside the small town of Rigaud. Therefore, more than 20 school buses travel on the road across nearby areas in order to bring students into school every morning and back home in the afternoon. On Friday afternoons, a few extra bus drivers have to go across Southern Quebec and South-Eastern Ontario to bring boarding students home, and pick them up once again on Sunday nights/Monday mornings and bring them back in school.

== School grounds ==
The Main Building: This is the largest building of the school where preschool, elementary and the first 3 grades of high school classes are located. Lockers spaces, entertainment halls with ping-pong tables and foosball tables, a general store, cafeteria, infirmary, library and administration offices.

The Querbes Building: This is the building dedicated to the classrooms of seniors: secondary 4 and 5 students. The building additionally houses boarding students on its upper floors.

== Athletics ==
Bourget is represented by the Voltigeurs Voltigeurs under many different sports: football, hockey, basketball, cheerleading, flag-football, cross-country, dance, swimming, thriathlon, soccer, volleyball, mountain-biking and cross-fit through RX1.

The Sports Building: Three gymnasium, an ice-skating arena, a fully equipped physical training room, a climbing wall and a semi-Olympic-size pool. The campus also features the following outdoor facilities: baseball fields, recreation yards, a football field, two soccer field, many beach volleyball courts and six tennis courts. Bourget is located near a ski hill where weekly ski sessions are offered on Wednesday nights in January.

== Notable alumni ==
- Gustave Évanturel, an Ontario notary public, insurance executive and political figure.
- Edmond Proulx, an Ontario lawyer and politician.
- Joseph Tassé, a Canadian writer, translator, and parliamentarian
- Lamarche, Gustave, Le Collège sur la colline : petit historique du Collège Bourget de Rigaud / Gustave Lamarche...; orné de six dessins de maisons et de trois lettrines en couleurs par le P. Jean-René Goulet...; [illustration réalisée par le P. Antonin Lamarche...]. Rigaud : Edition de l'Echo de Bourget, 1951. 197 p. : ill. (certaines en coul.), plans, portr.; 23 cm.
- Auclair, Élie-J. Rigaud-de-Vaudreuil et son Collège Bourget, 1941, 40p. Etude présentée à la Société royale, session de mai 1941, par l'abbé Elie-J. Auclair, docteur en théologie et en droit canonique, de la Société royale du Canada, de la Société historique de Montréal et de la Société historique de Rigaud.
- The Quebec History Encyclopedia – Collège Bourget, Rigaud, P.Q. Reproducing the text from: Vedette, 1952. Le fait français au Canada. Première édition, Montréal, Société nouvelle de publicité, 1953, 717p., pp. 553-554.
- Séguin, Raymond. Bourget, au quotidien--, [1850-2000]. [Rigaud : Collège Bourget, [*21 doc.] 2000] 242 p. : ill., portr.; 25 cm. ISBN 2-920233-05-X
- Santerre, David (June 29, 2013). "Trois Clercs de Saint-Viateur accusés d'agressions sexuelles". La Presse.
