= Simon Labrosse =

Canadian politician (1936–1896)

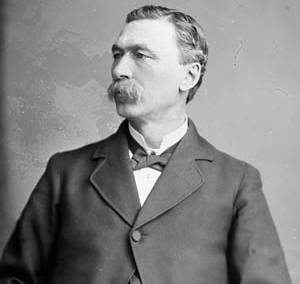
Simon Labrosse Source: Library and Archives Canada

Simon Labrosse (1836 – August 29, 1896) was an Ontario businessman and political figure. He represented Prescott in the House of Commons of Canada as an independent Conservative member (some sources say Liberal) from 1882 to 1891.

He was born in Saint-Benoît, Lower Canada in 1836, the son of Pierre Labrosse. He married Marie Ethier in 1861. He was a merchant at St. Eugene, also serving on the council and as reeve for East Hawkesbury Township and as warden in 1874 for Prescott and Russell counties. Labrosse was also postmaster for St. Eugene from 1862 to 1882. He ran unsuccessfully against Albert Hagar for a seat in the provincial legislative in an 1881 by-election. He defeated Félix Routhier in 1882 and 1887 for the seat in the federal parliament.

He died in East Hawkesbury Township at the age of 60.

His son Louis-Joseph represented Prescott in the provincial assembly.

1882 Canadian federal election: Prescott
Party	Candidate	Votes
Liberal	Simon Labrosse	1,322
Conservative	Félix Routhier	1,021

1887 Canadian federal election: Prescott
Party	Candidate	Votes
Liberal	Simon Labrosse	1,414
Conservative	Félix Routhier	1,223

Parliament of Canada
Preceded by Félix Routhier	Member of Parliament for Prescott; 1882-1891	Succeeded by Isidore Proulx
