= Alfred Évanturel =

Canadian politician

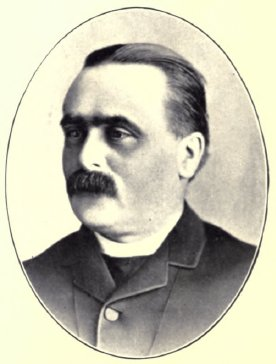

Ontario MPP
- In office 1886–1904
- Preceded by: Albert Hagar
- Succeeded by: Louis-Joseph Labrosse
- Constituency: Prescott

9th Speaker of the Legislative Assembly of Ontario
- In office 1898–1902
- Preceded by: William Balfour
- Succeeded by: William Andrew Charlton

Personal details
- Born: François Eugène Alfred Évanturel; August 31, 1846 Quebec City, Canada East
- Died: November 15, 1908 (aged 62) Alfred, Ontario
- Party: Liberal
- Portfolio: Minister Without Portfolio (1904–1905)

François Eugène Alfred Évanturel (August 31, 1846 – November 15, 1908) was speaker of the Legislature of Ontario in 1897-1902 and served as Liberal MLA for Prescott from 1886 to 1904. His name also appears in an anglicized form as Francis Evanturel.

He was born at Quebec City in 1846, the son of François Évanturel, and studied at the Petit Séminaire de Québec and the Université Laval. He was called to the Lower Canada bar in 1871 and set up practice at Quebec. In 1873, he married Maria Victoria Louisa Lee. The following year, he went to Ottawa, where he was employed in the secretariat of the Minister of Public Works. After working with the Post Office Department, he moved to Alfred, Ontario in 1881. He became a strong proponent for Francophone rights in the province and was particularly opposed to the policy of English-only schools supported by the provincial Conservatives. In 1886, he established a weekly newspaper L'Interprète in Alfred. In 1892, the paper was purchased by Henri Bourassa and relocated to Montebello, Quebec. He was made speaker in the legislature as a result of pressure from Wilfrid Laurier and became the first and, to date, the only Francophone to occupy that post. In 1904, he became a minister without portfolio in the provincial cabinet, thus becoming the first Francophone cabinet minister in the province.

He died in Alfred in 1908.

His son Gustave served in both the House of Commons and the Ontario assembly.

The township of Evanturel took its name from Évanturel.
