= Ski Mont Rigaud =

Coordinates: 45°28′00″N 74°20′10″W

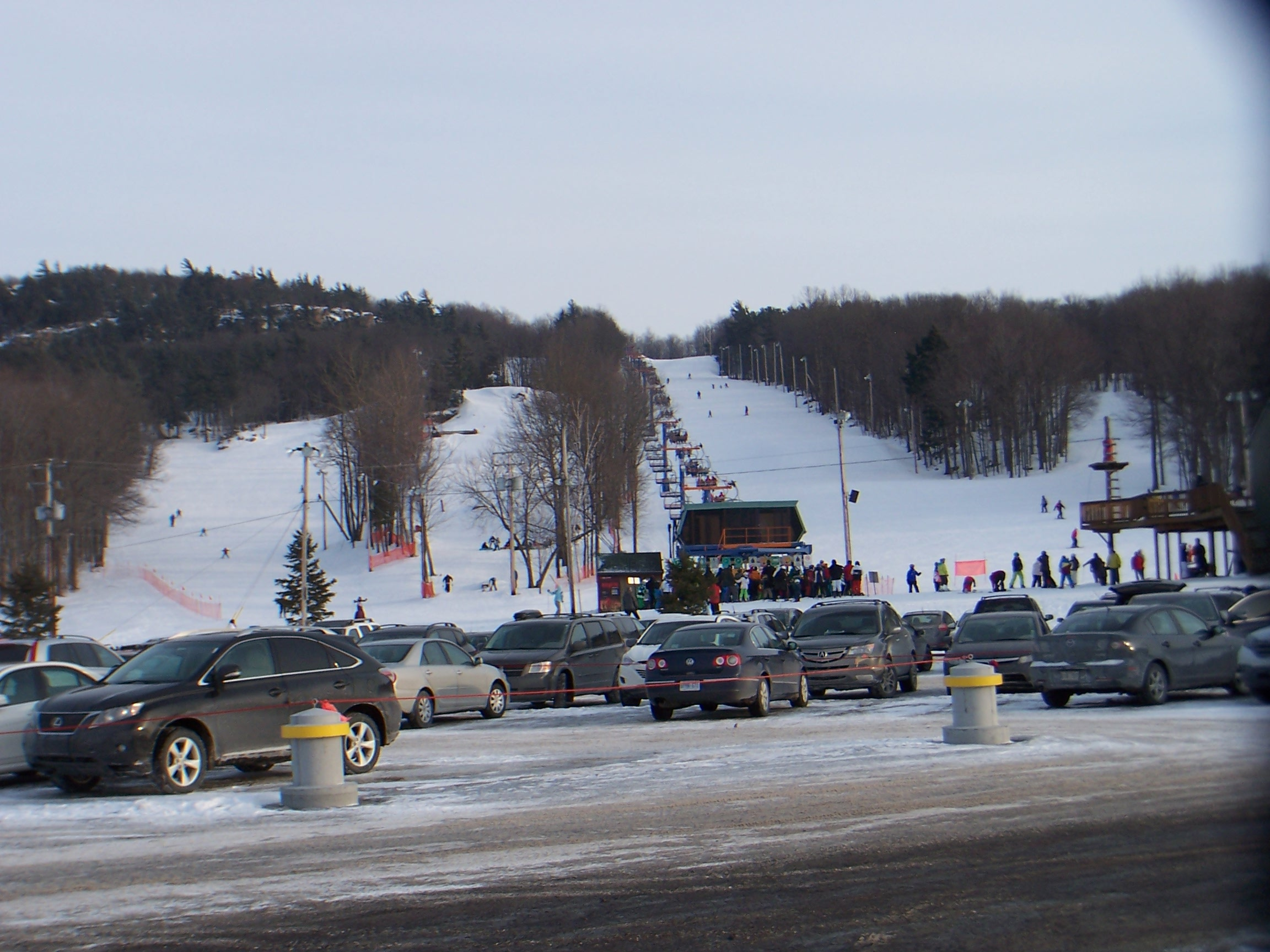
Ski Mont Rigaud

Ski Mont Rigaud is an alpine ski facility on the slopes of Rigaud Mountain, in the municipality of Rigaud, Quebec. It is in the suburbs of Montreal, near the Ontario border, one of two alpine ski hills that still operate in the suburbs of Montreal. The hill is located only 30 minutes off Montreal island, about 25 km (16 mi) to the west. It is the only ski hill in westernmost Quebec south of the Ottawa River. Nearby is the Nordic skiing centre, "The Escapade".

Ski Mont Rigaud bills itself as the "Ski Kindergarten of Quebec" (and in French: "la maternelle du ski au Québec"), and offers ski lessons for alpine skiing and alpine snowboarding. Its facilities include two snowparks, and lit pistes for evening skiing. It was founded in 1986. The facilities are able to function with 100% artificial snow cover. As of 2025, the hill has two 4 person ski lift and two magic carpets.

In the summer season, the area is open for mountain biking including a mountain bike camp for kids (sprockids). Hiking, running and the FQME maintains rock climbing cliffs beside the Mont Rigaud property.
