= James P. Boyd =

Canadian politician

James Boyd

Ontario MPP
- In office 1867–1871
- Preceded by: Riding established
- Succeeded by: George Wellesley Hamilton
- Constituency: Prescott

Personal details
- Born: March 3, 1826 Limerick, Ireland
- Died: April 12, 1890 (aged 64)
- Party: Liberal
- Spouse: Adelia Caroline Wells
- Occupation: Businessman

James P. Boyd (March 3, 1826 – April 12, 1890) was an Ontario businessman and political figure. He represented Prescott in the Legislative Assembly of Ontario as a Liberal member from 1867 to 1871.

He was born in Limerick, Ireland in 1826 and came to Canada West in 1847, settling at Vankleek Hill. He married Adelia Caroline Wells there. Boyd was a timber merchant and sawmill owner. He also owned a gristmill, carding mill and general store. He served as a reeve of West Hawkesbury Township. He was also a minister of the Congregational Church of London, Ontario. Boyd defeated Thomas McGee for the seat in the provincial assembly in 1867. In 1874, he ran unsuccessfully for the same seat in the House of Commons. In 1878, he was forced to sell his mills after encountering financial difficulties.

== Electoral history ==
1867 Ontario general election: Prescott
Party	Candidate	Votes	%
Liberal	James P. Boyd	838	50.67
Conservative	Thomas D'Arcy McGee	816	49.33
Total valid votes		1,654	82.78
Eligible voters		1,998	
Liberal pickup new district.			
Source: Elections Ontario

1871 Ontario general election: Prescott
Party	Candidate	Votes	%
Conservative	George Wellesley Hamilton	853	54.26
Liberal	James P. Boyd	719	45.74
Turnout		1,572	75.61
Eligible voters		2,079	
Election voided
Source: Elections Ontario
