= Louis-Joseph Labrosse =

Canadian politician

Ontario MPP
- In office 1905–1908
- Preceded by: Alfred Évanturel
- Succeeded by: Georges Pharand
- Constituency: Prescott

Personal details
- Born: June 20, 1872 St. Eugene, Ontario, Canada
- Died: April 7, 1958 (aged 85)
- Party: Liberal
- Spouse: Yvonne Bourque (m. 1892)
- Occupation: Notary

Louis-Joseph Labrosse (June 20, 1872 – April 7, 1958) was an Ontario notary and political figure. He represented Prescott in the Legislative Assembly of Ontario from 1905 to 1908.

He was born in 1872 in St. Eugene, the son of Simon Labrosse. Labrosse was educated in Montreal and at the Ottawa Business College. In 1892, he married Yvonne Bourque. He served as postmaster at St. Eugene. He defeated François-Eugène-Alfred Évanturel to win the Prescott seat in 1905; he was defeated by Georges Pharand in 1908. He died in 1958.
