= Joseph Binette =

Canadian politician

Joseph Binette (May 1, 1861 – January 19, 1950) was an Ontario farmer, businessman and political figure. He represented Prescott in the House of Commons of Canada as a Liberal member from 1922 to 1925.

He was born in St. Eugene, Canada West in 1861, the son of Joseph Binette and Flavie Bissonnette. He married Palmyre Lavigne in 1887. He operated a farm and was a hay and grain dealer at Sainte-Anne-de-Prescott. Binette served on the township council for four years and was reeve for East Hawkesbury Township for 15 years. He was elected as a Progressive in 1921 but joined the Liberal caucus in the House of Commons in 1922.

He died in Sainte-Anne-de-Prescott at the age of 88.

1921 Canadian federal election: Prescott
Party	Candidate	Votes
Progressive	Joseph Binette	3,661
Independent Liberal	Edmond Proulx	2,764
Liberal	Amédée Sabourin	2,359

Parliament of Canada
Preceded by Edmond Proulx	Member of Parliament for Prescott; 1921-1925	Succeeded by Gustave Évanturel
