= 1615 in Quebec =

Events from the year 1615 in Quebec.

== Events ==
- 2 June 1615 – Father Jean Dolbeau of the Récollets, a French branch of the Franciscans, arrives in Quebec City with Samuel de Champlain.
- Following the arrival of the Récollets in New France, the first ever mass is being celebrated on the island of Montreal.
- Champlain and two other French colonists, one of whom is probably Étienne Brûlé, leaves the colony to journey inland in the company of the Wendat, an allied First Nation tribe. They reach Lake Simcoe and later split up. Near Oneida Lake, the French and Wendat are involved in a combat with the Iroquois, the traditional First Nation enemy of the Wendat and the French. de Champlain is injured in the battle.
