= Henry Joseph Cloran =

Canadian politician

The Hon. Henry Joseph Cloran

Senator for Victoria, Quebec
- In office 1903–1928
- Appointed by: Wilfrid Laurier
- Preceded by: James O'Brien
- Succeeded by: Edmund William Tobin

Personal details
- Born: May 8, 1855 Montreal, Canada East
- Died: February 8, 1928 (aged 72)
- Party: Liberal

Henry Joseph Cloran KC (May 8, 1855 – February 8, 1928) was a lawyer, educator, journalist and political figure in Quebec. He represented Victoria division in the Senate of Canada from 1903 to 1928.

He was born in Montreal, the son of Joseph Cloran and Ann Kennedy, both immigrants from Ireland, and was educated at the Sulpician colleges in Montreal and Paris, at the Université Laval in Montreal and McGill University. Cloran was called to the Quebec bar in 1887.

He served on a commission formed by the Quebec government to report on jury systems in use in Canada and the United States and also served as Crown Attorney for Montreal. Cloran was editor of the Catholic newspapers the Daily Post and the True Witness.

Cloran was one of the founders of the Montreal Trades and Labour Council. In 1882, he married Agnes Donovan. Cloran moved to Hawkesbury, Ontario around 1891. Cloran was an unsuccessful candidate in the federal riding of Montreal Centre as a Liberal in 1887 and in Prescott as a Patrons of Industry candidate in 1896 and then as a Liberal in 1900. He served as reeve and mayor of Hawkesbury from 1894 to 1901. Cloran died in office at the age of 72.
