= Félix Routhier =

Canadian politician

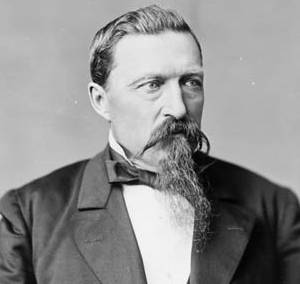
Félix Routhier Source: Library and Archives Canada

Félix Routhier (21 May 1827 – 23 December 1903) was an Ontario businessman and political figure. He represented Prescott in the House of Commons of Canada as a Conservative member from 1878 to 1882.

He was born in Saint-Placide, Lower Canada in 1827, the son of farmer Charles Routhier. He married Angelique Lemay dit Delorme in 1849. He served as justice of the peace, major in the local militia and mayor of Saint-Placide. In 1870, he moved to Vankleek Hill, Ontario, where he took over the operation of a foundry. Routhier defeated Albert Hagar to win the Prescott seat in 1878; he was defeated by Simon Labrosse in the elections that followed in 1882 and 1887 and by Isidore Proulx in 1891. The foundry at Vankleek Hill went bankrupt in 1897.

He was the brother of judge Adolphe-Basile Routhier.

== Electoral record ==
1878 Canadian federal election: Prescott
Party	Candidate	Votes
Conservative	Félix Routhier	875
Liberal	Albert Hagar	870
Unknown	Angus Urquhart	661

1882 Canadian federal election: Prescott
Party	Candidate	Votes
Liberal	Simon Labrosse	1,322
Conservative	Félix Routhier	1,021

1887 Canadian federal election: Prescott
Party	Candidate	Votes
Liberal	Simon Labrosse	1,414
Conservative	Félix Routhier	1,223

1891 Canadian federal election: Prescott
Party	Candidate	Votes
Liberal	Isidore Proulx	1,269
Conservative	Félix Routhier	608
Unknown	E. A. Johnson	532
Unknown	David Bertrand	335
