= Albert Hagar =

Canadian politician

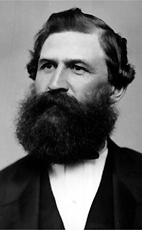

Ontario MPP
- In office 1881–1886
- Preceded by: William Harkin
- Succeeded by: Alfred Évanturel
- Constituency: Prescott

Member of Parliament for Prescott
- In office 1867–1878
- Preceded by: Riding established
- Succeeded by: Félix Routhier

Personal details
- Born: January 1, 1827 North Plantagenet Township, Upper Canada
- Died: September 14, 1924 (aged 97) North Plantagenet Township, Upper Canada
- Party: Liberal
- Occupation: Merchant

Albert Hagar (January 1, 1827 – September 14, 1924) was a Canadian merchant and politician.

Hagar was born in North Plantagenet Township, Upper Canada (now Ontario) in 1827. He was the son of Abner Hagar, a former Montreal merchant, and Hannah P. Barker. He was educated in Vermont and became a farmer, merchant and lumber dealer and owned a sawmill and gristmill at Plantagenet. Hagar was elected to the Canadian House of Commons for the riding of Prescott in 1867. A Liberal, he was acclaimed in 1872 and re-elected in the federal election in 1874. He was defeated in the federal election in 1878.

He was elected to the Legislative Assembly of Ontario for the riding of Prescott in an 1881 by-election held after the death of William Harkin. A Liberal, he was re-elected in 1883.

Hagar was also a captain in the local militia, superintendent of schools, reeve for North Plantagenet Township and warden for Prescott and Russell counties. He also served as sheriff for Prescott and Russell counties. Later in life, he was the last surviving member of the first Canadian parliament.

Hagar died in Plantagenet at the age of 97.

== Electoral record ==
1867 Canadian federal election: Prescott
Party	Candidate	Votes
Liberal	Albert Hagar	1,205
Unknown	Thomas Higginson	130

1872 Canadian federal election: Prescott
Party	Candidate	Votes
Liberal	Albert Hagar	acclaimed
Source: Canadian Elections Database

1874 Canadian federal election: Prescott
Party	Candidate	Votes
Liberal	Albert Hagar	665
Unknown	T. White Jr.	659
Unknown	J. Boyd	292

1878 Canadian federal election: Prescott
Party	Candidate	Votes
Conservative	Félix Routhier	875
Liberal	Albert Hagar	870
Unknown	Angus Urquhart	661
