= Louis-Mathias Auger =

Canadian politician

Mayor of Hawkesbury, Ontario
- In office 1936–1936

Member of Parliament for Prescott
- In office September 14, 1926 – 1929
- Preceded by: Gustave Évanturel
- Succeeded by: Vacant

Louis-Mathias Auger (April 3, 1902 – March 6, 1966) was an Ontario teacher and political figure. He represented Prescott in the House of Commons of Canada as a Liberal member from 1926 to 1929.

He was born in Contrecoeur, Quebec in 1902, the son of Louis Auger, and moved to Hawkesbury, Ontario with his family in 1912. Auger had studied at the University of Ottawa and went on to teach there. He defeated Gustave Évanturel to win a seat in the House of Commons in 1926. During his term in office, he was articling with a lawyer in L'Original and studying law part-time at Osgoode Hall. He resigned his seat in 1929 after being accused of raping a young woman from his constituency who had come to see him in the House of Commons about possible employment in the public service. Auger, whose lawyer was Gordon Smith Henderson, was finally acquitted of the charge of rape but found guilty of seduction and was sentenced to two years in Kingston Penitentiary, the maximum penalty for that crime, after five trials and two appeals over sixteen months.

He ran unsuccessfully as an independent Liberal in 1935. Auger served as mayor of Hawkesbury in 1936.

In 2006, Marguerite Andersen published a novel Doucement le bonheur (Gently happiness) (ISBN 2894232063) based on the events surrounding the trial.

1926 Canadian federal election: Prescott
Party	Candidate	Votes
Independent Liberal	Louis-Mathias Auger	3,846
Liberal	Gustave Évanturel	3,134
Conservative	Hiram Horton Kirby	2,504
Independent	Raoul Labrosse	635

Parliament of Canada
Preceded by Gustave Évanturel	Member of Parliament for Prescott; 1926-1929	Succeeded by Élie-Oscar Bertrand
