= Sainte-Marthe, Quebec =

Sainte-Marthe
- Municipality
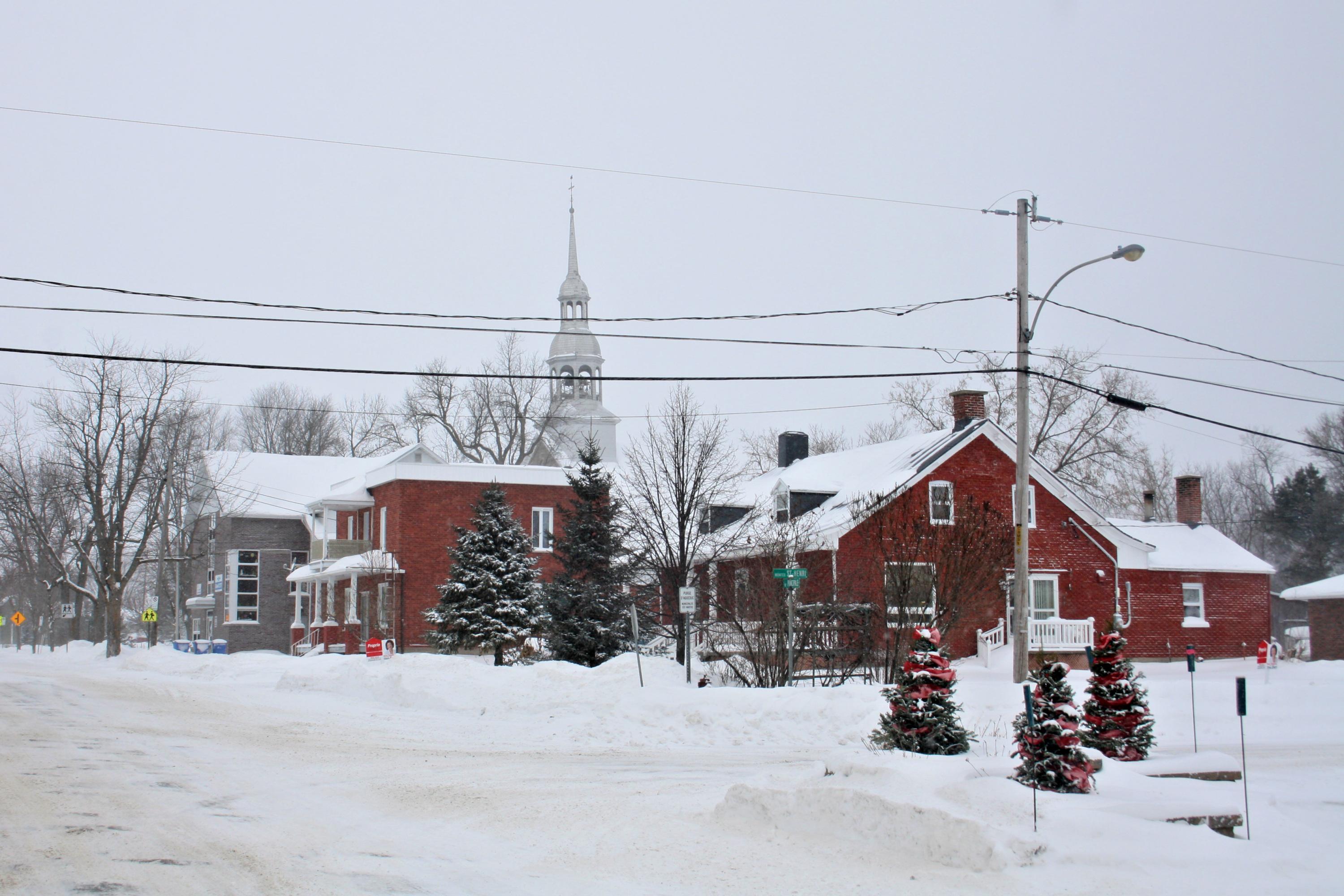
- rue Principale in Sainte-Marthe

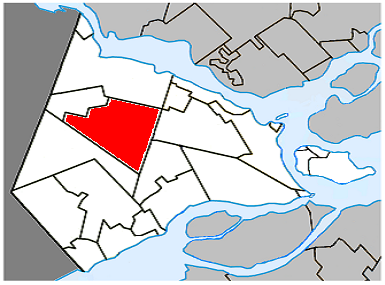
- Location within Vaudreuil-Soulanges RCM

- Location in southern Quebec
- Coordinates: 45°24′N 74°18′W
- Country: Canada
- Province: Quebec
- Region: Montérégie
- RCM: Vaudreuil-Soulanges
- Constituted: 27 December 1980

Government
  - Mayor: François Pleau
  - Federal riding: Salaberry—Suroît
  - Prov. riding: Soulanges

Area
  - Total: 79.92 km^{2} (30.86 sq mi)
  - Land: 79.60 km^{2} (30.73 sq mi)

Population (2021)
  - Total: 1,014
  - Density: 12.7/km^{2} (33/sq mi)
  - Pop 2016-2021: ▼7.6%
  - Dwellings: 448
- Time zone: UTC−5 (EST)
  - Summer (DST): UTC−4 (EDT)
- Postal code(s): J0P 1W0
- Area codes: 450 and 579
- Highways: R-201
- Website: www.sainte-marthe.ca

Sainte-Marthe (French pronunciation: [sɛ̃t maʁt]) is a municipality located in the Vaudreuil-Soulanges Regional County Municipality of Quebec, Canada. The population as of the 2021 Canadian census was 1,014.

The local economy is based almost exclusively on agriculture.

== History ==
Settlement began in 1835 with the arrival of Irish immigrants. In 1846, the parish was founded and named after Martha, the sister of Lazarus, since the neighbouring parish was called Saint-Lazare.

That same year, the Municipality of Sainte Marthe was created out of the Municipality of Rigaud, but abolished on 1 September 1847. In 1851, its post office opened. On 1 July 1855, the municipality was reestablished, which became a parish municipality in 1857.

In 1928, the village itself separated from the surrounding rural parish and became the Village Municipality of Sainte-Marthe.

On 27 December 1980, the parish and village merged to form the Municipality of Sainte-Marthe.

On 5–6 April 2023, a storm of black ice caused 623 person to lose electricity.

== Demographics ==
Canada census – Sainte-Marthe community profile

	2021	2016	2011
Population	1,014 (-7.6% from 2016)	1,097 (2.0% from 2011)	1,075 (-0.5% from 2006)
Land area	79.60 km^{2} (30.73 sq mi)	79.73 km^{2} (30.78 sq mi)	79.80 km^{2} (30.81 sq mi)
Population density	12.7/km^{2} (33/sq mi)	13.8/km^{2} (36/sq mi)	13.5/km^{2} (35/sq mi)
Median age	48.4 (M: 48.4, F: 48.8)	46.7 (M: 47.1, F: 46.3)	44.5 (M: 44.7, F: 44.3)
Private dwellings	448 (total)	451 (total)	430 (total)
Median household income	$83,000	$68,928	$56,221

References: 2021 2016 2011

Historical Census Data - Sainte-Marthe, Quebec

Year	Pop.	±%
1981	1,099	—
1986	1,055	−4.0%
1991	1,056	+0.1%
1996	1,090	+3.2%
2001	1,094	+0.4%

Year	Pop.	±%
2006	1,080	−1.3%
2011	1,075	−0.5%
2016	1,097	+2.0%
2021	1,014	−7.6%

Source: Statistics Canada

=== Language ===
Canada Census Mother Tongue - Sainte-Marthe, Quebec
Census	Total	French			English			French & English			Other		
Year	Responses	Count	Trend	Pop %	Count	Trend	Pop %	Count	Trend	Pop %	Count	Trend	Pop %
2021	1,010	820	▼7.9%	81.2%	140	▼15.2%	13.9%	20	▲33.3%	2.0%	25	▼16.7%	2.5%
2016	1,095	890	▲1.7%	81.3%	165	▲10.0%	15.1%	15	0.0%	1.4%	30	▼14.3%	2.7%
2011	1,075	875	▼1.7%	81.4%	150	▲3.4%	14.0%	15	▼40.0%	1.4%	35	▲133.3%	3.3%
2006	1,075	890	▼5.8%	82.8%	145	▲20.8%	13.5%	25	▲150.0%	2.3%	15	0.0%	1.4%
2001	1,090	945	▲9.9%	86.7%	120	▼11.1%	11.0%	10	0.0%	0.9%	15	▼83.3%	1.4%
1996	1,095	860	n/a	78.5%	135	n/a	12.3%	10	n/a	0.9%	90	n/a	8.2%

== Government ==
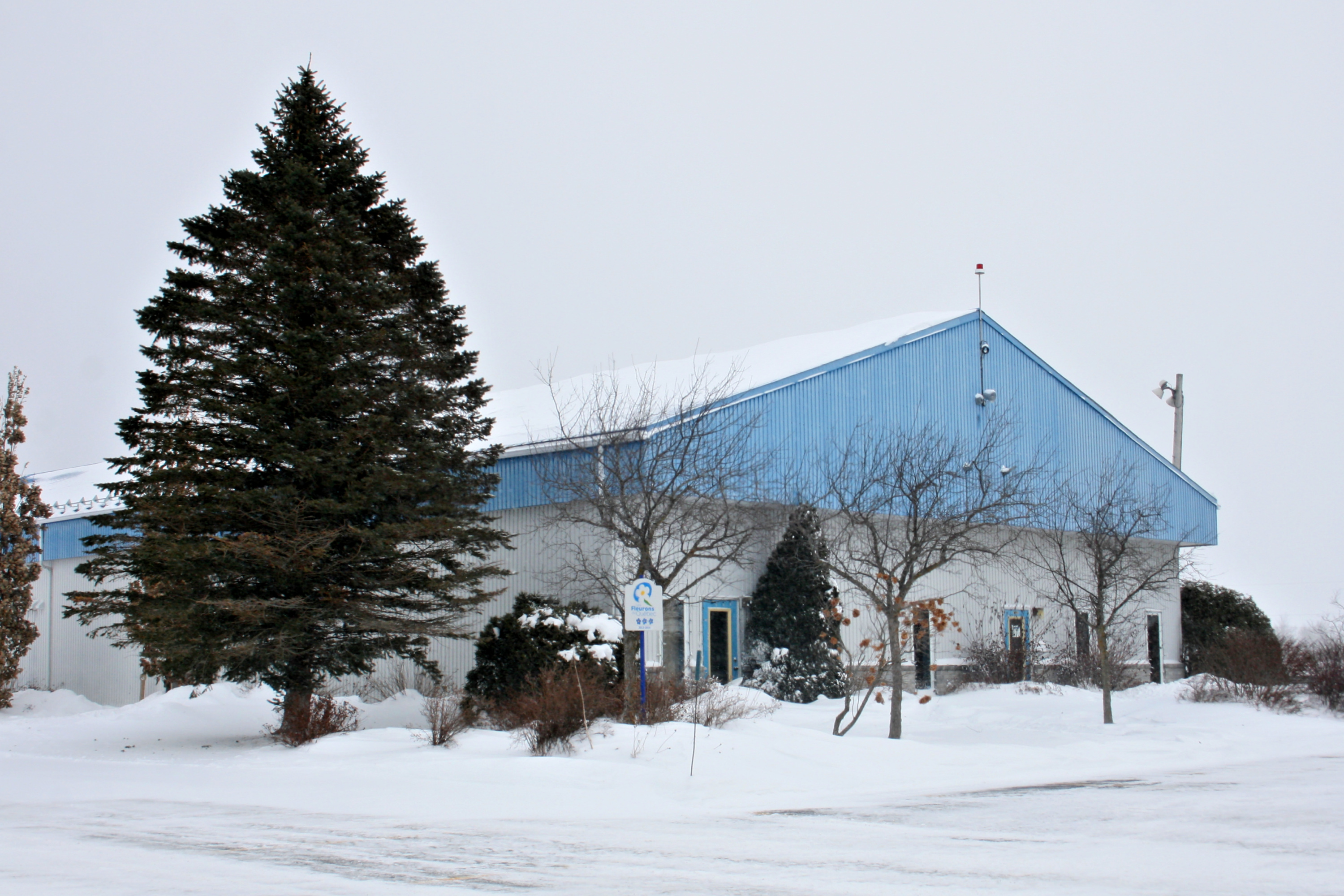
Municipal hall of Ste-Marthe

List of former mayors (since formation of current municipality):

- Léon-Henri Bourbonnais (1980–1984)
- Joseph Antoine Wilfrid Germain Roy (1984–1994)
- Joseph Aimé Jean Guy Durocher (1994–2005)
- Aline Guillotte (2005–2017)
- François Pleau (2017–present)

== Education ==
Commission Scolaire des Trois-Lacs operates Francophone schools.

- École Sainte-Marthe

Lester B. Pearson School Board operates Anglophone schools.

- Soulanges Elementary School in Saint-Télesphore or Evergreen Elementary and Forest Hill Elementary (Junior Campus and Senior campus) in Saint-Lazare

== See also ==
- List of anglophone communities in Quebec
- List of municipalities in Quebec
