= Caledonia Springs, Ontario =

Caledonia Springs French: Les Sources, lit. 'the springs'
- Unincorporated community

- Location of Caledonia Springs in Ontario
- Coordinates: 45°32′35″N 74°48′06″W
- Country: Canada
- Province: Ontario
- County: Prescott and Russell
- Municipality: The Nation
- Elevation: 48 m (157 ft)
- Time zone: UTC-5 (Eastern Time Zone)
  - Summer (DST): UTC-4 (Eastern Daylight Time)
- Postal code: K0B 1L0
- Area codes: 613, 343

Caledonia Springs (French: Les Sources) is an unincorporated community in the northwest of the municipality of The Nation, Prescott and Russell United Counties in Eastern Ontario, Canada. It is part of the National Capital Region and is in the geographic county of Caledonia.

The hamlet is located at the intersection of the Prescott and Russell Recreational Trail (formerly the Canadian Pacific Railway) and County Road 20, which forms a 90-degree angle heading north and east from the settlement. The nearest communities are Alfred in the township of Alfred and Plantagenet to the north-west, and Vankleek Hill to the east. A tributary of the Ruisseau des Atocas flows through the community.

In the second half of the 19th century, Caledonia Springs was a notable mineral spring resort, drawing hundreds of visitors each summer. It was renowned as "the most famous watering-place of Canada", and considered "among the wonders of the world."

== History ==
The springs of mineral water in this area were first known to and used by the indigenous, followed by European hunters and settlers. The springs were first described in 1806 by Alexander Grant (1774–1848), a former administrator of the North West Company who had settled in L'Orignal to start his own fur trading business. A few years later, development began when Mr. Kellogg built a rudimentary shelter and then a larger building. From then on, word about the purported healing properties of the springs began to spread and, despite the great difficulty reaching Caledonia Springs over almost impassable trails from L'Orignal, visitors from afar started to come.

In 1835, the springs were purchased by Lemuel Cushing who sold them to William Parker the next year. Parker immediately began making improvements, including clearing forest, channeling the spring water, and building proper accommodations for visitors. By 1837, land immediately around the springs had been surveyed and laid out in village lots, with a large public square planned in the centre. A store was erected and stocked, a post office established, a large hotel commenced, and a carriage road cut through the woods.

Canada House

In 1838, the Caledonia Springs Company was founded and the Canada House hotel with bath house opened. A month after opening however, the hotel burned down. An old hotel was put back in order, while Parker raised money to rebuild by the selling of lots (which were sought after and bought by prominent people of that time, including Alexander Fraser, John McGillivray, John Hamilton, George Pyke, Peter McGill, and John Sandfield Macdonald). A new hotel was built that was considerably enlarged to keep pace with the rapid influx of visitors, the baths much improved, a billiard room and ball alley built. A large village sprung up around it, complete with a church and school house, welcoming visitors from all over Canada and the United States. By 1841, there were 3 hotels, and by 1846, there were 4 hotels, and the village had 2 stores, 2 chapels, and even a bottling plant. The place had then gained the reputation as the "Saratoga of Canada".

A period of stagnation set in until 1867 when the new Canada House Hotel opened. This four-story stone building with 200 beds more than doubled the town's accommodation capacity. But again fire destroyed the hotel a few years later.

Grand Hotel, September 1875

In June 1875, the Grand Hotel was completed, able to host 300 guests. The four-story building had a large gallery inspired by that of the Grand Union Hotel in Saratoga Springs, New York. Its amenities and luxuries included ball rooms, bars, croquet and lawn tennis courts, mail and telegraph office, and laundry facilities, entirely lighted with gas and heated with steam when required. It was open each year from the first of June to the first of October.

In 1896, a track of the Canadian Pacific Railway between Ottawa and Montreal was built, with a station at Caledonia Springs.

In 1905, the entire spa resort was acquired by the Canadian Pacific Railway, including the springs, the Grand Hotel, all the other buildings in the town center, three other smaller hotels, the bottling plant, the pavilions, and the two chapels. The Grand Hotel was renamed to Caledonia Springs Hotel, more amenities were added, such as a golf course, and it now operated year-round.

=== Decline ===
Trends and people's preferences were changing around the turn of the century. People seeking cures and vacationers were gradually drawn to grander settings in the mountains or along the coast. Caledonia Springs, situated on flat marshy land, declined in popularity, following the pattern of other small spa towns in Central Canada. Furthermore, at the same time, modern medicine began replacing mineral water as treatment of various ailments.

In November 1915, the Canadian Pacific decided to close the Caledonia Springs Hotel, likely because it was no longer profitable. Since this hotel had been the heart of the community, the place lost its national and even international appeal. The smaller hotels remained open for a while longer. In 1919, the bottling plant closed and the next year, the Caledonia Springs Hotel was demolished. In the 1940s, many of the other buildings were demolished, and in 1947, the last hotel, the Adanac Inn, also closed.

In 1960, Caledonia Springs' post office closed and its railway station was torn down.

== The springs ==
There were 4 mineral springs originating from strata of clay that overlay a rock equivalent to the Trenton Limestone. They were known as the Gas Spring, Saline Spring, and White Sulphur Spring, alkaline springs that were located near each other, while the fourth one, the Intermitting Spring was about 3 kilometres (1.9 mi) away and more saline. The mineral water was used for drinking and bathing.

The discharge of the springs towards the end of the 19th century was:

- The Gas Spring: 4 gallons per minute
- The Saline Spring: 10 gallons per minute
- The White Sulphur Spring: 4 gallons per minute

The minerals contained in the water include sodium, magnesium, sulfur, potassium, silica, chlorine, bromine, calcium chloride, iodine, carbonate, sulfate, manganese, phosphate, carbon dioxide, and sulfur dioxide. The different combinations and ratios of these minerals gave each spring a unique character.

=== 19th Century health claims ===
At the end of the 19th century, it was claimed that the water from the Caledonia Springs were effective "in all cases of chronic rheumatism, gout, neuralgia, chorea, cutaneous diseases, chlorosis, barrenness, diseases of the eyes, skin, bladder, kidneys, liver and blood, constipation, dyspepsia, loss of appetite, want of sleep, fatigue, mental anxiety, vertigo, and in the eradication of mercury from the system."

At that time it was generally believed that drinking and bathing in white sulphur waters, wherever occurring, was beneficial health-wise, but in particular the White Sulphur Spring at Caledonia was praised for its combination of supposedly medicinal qualities, and when taken together with the Saline and Gas Spring waters, it was thought to provide quick relief for a wide range of afflictions, seldom experienced elsewhere.

"Of hundreds of persons yearly brought to Caledonia Springs ..., it is safe to say that in no case ... has relief failed to be met with, but, on the contrary, radical cure is the rule, and with a speediness surprising as well as pleasing to the patient."

— Chisholm's All-round Route and Panoramic Guide of the St. Lawrence

It was recommended to drink water from the Saline Spring in the morning, bath in Sulphur Spring water after breakfast, drink the Sulphur water during the day, and drink the water from the Gas Spring at night. At least three weeks were required to be devoted to the springs to receive permanent benefit.

== See also ==
- Carlsbad Springs, Ontario - former spa resort near Ottawa with similar history
