= Prescott and Russell Recreational Trail =

Trail in Ontario, Canada

Prescott-Russell Recreational Trail
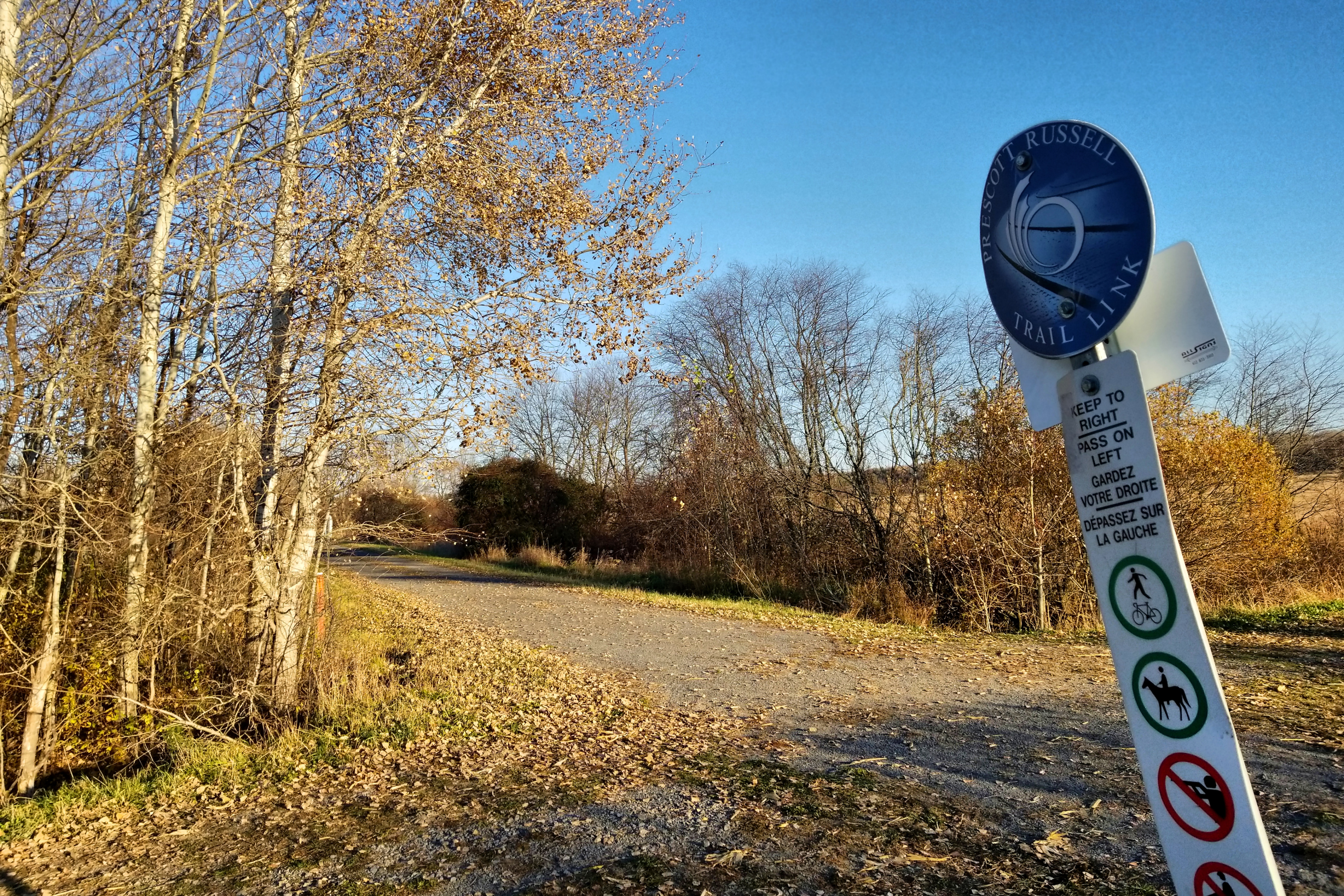
- Length: 98 km (61 mi) (including Prescott-Russell Trail Link)
- Location: Ontario, Canada
- Trailheads: Saint-Eugène; Eastern boundary of Ottawa
- Use: Hiking, cycling, jogging, horseback riding, cross-country skiing, snowshoeing, and with a permit: snowmobiling
- Difficulty: Easy
- Season: Year-round
- Hazards: Mosquitoes, poison ivy, wild parsnip

The Prescott-Russell Recreational Trail (Trail) is a 72 kilometres (45 mi) long former rail trail in Prescott-Russell, Ontario, Canada, maintained by a non profit corporation. The trail begins at the Quebec border in the east, just outside of the village of Saint-Eugène and goes to the eastern boundary of the City of Ottawa, passing through the townships of East Hawkesbury, Champlain, The Nation, Alfred and Plantagenet, and Clarence-Rockland.

The trail primarily passes through farmland, with some forested sections. Because it runs along a former railway, it is quite flat. The trail surface is mainly stone dust, although it is paved near the rural population centres. Notable sights along the trail include the former railway station in Bourget and the bridge over the South Nation River near Plantagenet. Six pavilions are located along the trail in Saint-Eugène, Vankleek Hill, Plantagenet, Alfred, Bourget, and Hammond.

The trail is used for a variety of purposes, including cycling, walking and snowmobiling (in the winter). Neither ATVs nor horse-riding are allowed on the Trail, although horse-riding is allowed on the Prescott-Russell Trail Link.

The route runs along the former roadbed of the Canadian Pacific line between Ottawa and Montreal, which was owned by Via Rail until 2021. The rails were lifted in 1986, while the trail was inaugurated in 2006. The agreement between Via and Prescott-Russell lasted until December 2021, when a non profit entity named the Sentier recreatif Prescott Russell Recreational Trail took over ownership and operations of the Trail.

== Potential closure ==
In 2016, the Prescott-Russell announced that it was studying the idea of closing the trail, due to its $400,000 per year maintenance cost.

The county ultimately decided in the 2017 budget to cut the trail maintenance budget to $200,000 a year. Further consultations on the viability of the trail have been held.

An agreement was reached in December 2021 between VIA Rail, the Counties and the non-profit corporation for the ownership and management of the Trail going forward.

== Prescott-Russell Trail link ==
The Prescott-Russell trail link is a 26 kilometres (16 mi) extension of the Prescott-Russell Recreational Trail into Ottawa, following the same former railway right-of-way. It goes from the western end of the Prescott-Russell trail at the eastern border of the Ottawa, passing near Navan and Orleans before ending in a dead end near Highway 417. It is maintained by the City of Ottawa.
