= Bourget, Ontario =

Bourget
- Unincorporated community
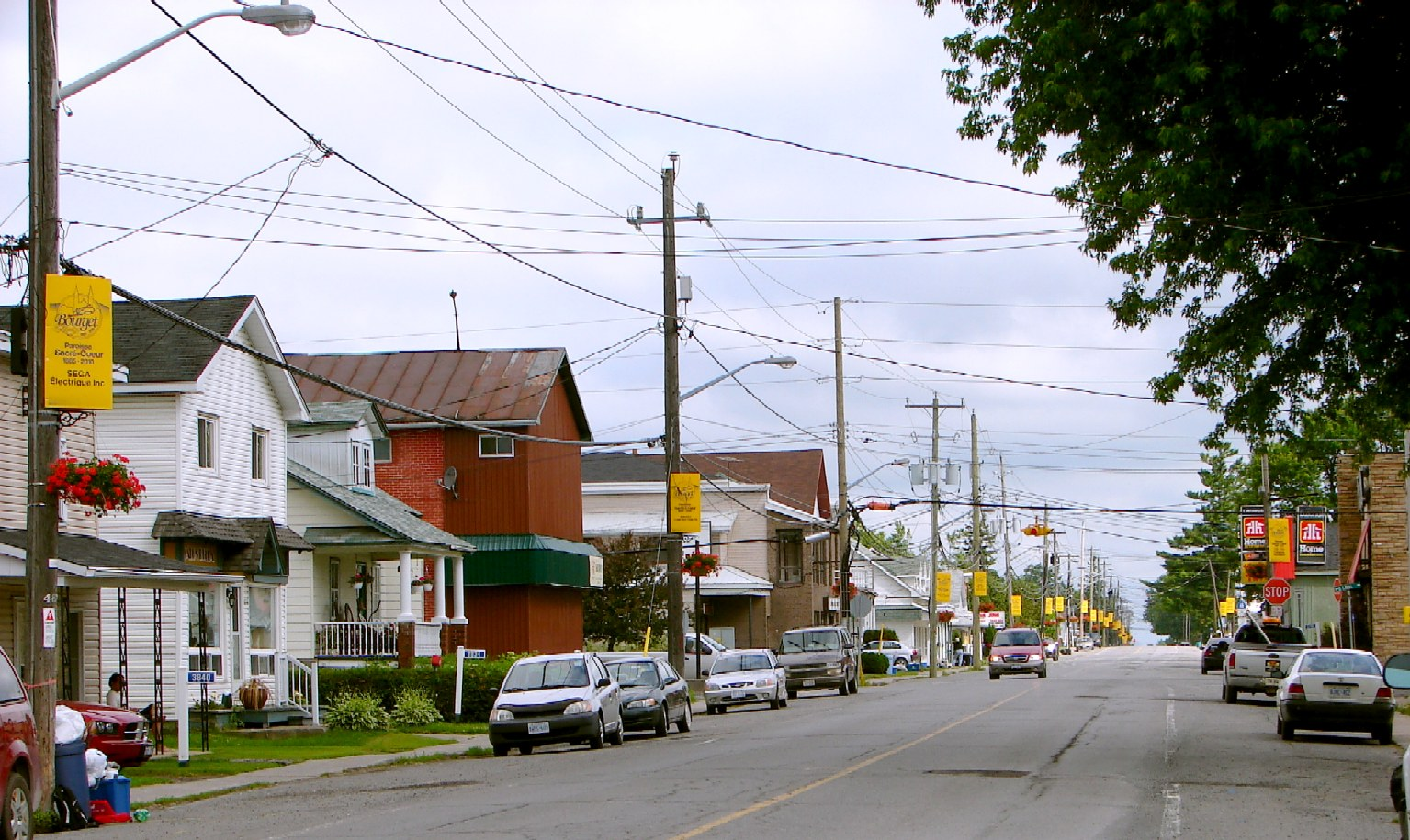

- Location within United Counties of Prescott and Russell Location within Southern Ontario
- Coordinates: 45°26′00″N 75°09′30″W
- Country: Canada
- Province: Ontario
- County: Prescott and Russell
- Municipality: Clarence-Rockland

Area
  - Land: 2.23 km^{2} (0.86 sq mi)

Population (2021)
  - Total: 1,175
  - Density: 527.8/km^{2} (1,367/sq mi)
- Time zone: UTC−05:00 (EST)
  - Summer (DST): UTC−04:00 (EDT)
- Postal code: K0A 1E0
- Area codes: 613, 343, and 753

Bourget is an unincorporated village in Eastern Ontario, Canada, near the Cobbs Lake Creek, in the city of Clarence-Rockland in the United Counties of Prescott and Russell.

It was named after Ignace Bourget (1799-1885), one-time Roman Catholic Bishop of Montreal.

During the 1920s, logging of the white pine forests in this area had left a barren sandy area then known as the "Bourget Desert". Since that time, millions of trees were planted and this area is now known as the Larose Forest (45°23′47″N 75°8′15″W), which is named after Ferdinand Larose, an agronomist who instigated and planned the planting of the trees to the lands not good for agriculture. East of Bourget during spring, Cobbs Lake Creek floods into the neighbouring fields and briefly hosts tens of thousands of migrating Greater Snow Geese and smaller numbers of migrants such as Northern Pintail ducks and Canada geese.

Two major roads pass through Bourget: one of them, the Russell Road (County Road 2), is used by commuters in the morning heading into Ottawa from the Eastern Ontario region; Champlain Street (County Road 8), which connects Rockland (north) to Casselman (south). After the 417 overpass southward of the County Road 8, it becomes the Provincial Highway 138 connecting to Cornwall, Ontario which is the second road passing through Bourget. This route is one of the few connecting the north to the south. The Prescott and Russell Recreational Trail, which uses a former Canadian Pacific railway right-of-way, also passes through the village.

Bourget is slowly expanding. Many housing projects are being developed in the northern part of town, and the small business sector is growing in the heart of Bourget with the opening of a small strip mall. Bourget is also home to the famous B&H railroad running from Hammond to Bourget and back.

== Demographics ==
Historical census populations – Bourget, Ontario
Year	Pop.	±%
2011	1,080	—
2016	1,169	+8.2%
2021	1,175	+0.5%
Source: Statistics Canada

- City Of Clarence-Rockland: 20,790 people (2006 Census)

== Notable people from Bourget ==
Bourget was also the home of:

- Stéphane Yelle, former professional ice hockey centre, now in an office position with the Colorado Avalanche
- Marc Dorion, professional ice sledge hockey player
- Gabrielle Goulet, singer
- Jake Hobart, 3rd officer on titanic
