= Cobbs Lake Creek =

- Location of the mouth of Cobbs Lake Creek in southern Ontario

Location
- Country: Canada
- Province: Ontario
- Region: Eastern Ontario
- County: Prescott and Russell
- Municipalities: The Nation, Alfred and Plantagenet, Clarence-Rockland

Physical characteristics
- Source: field
  - location: Clarence-Rockland
  - coordinates: 45°32′04″N 75°09′13″W
  - elevation: 84 m (276 ft)
- Mouth: South Nation River
  - location: The Nation
  - coordinates: 45°26′38″N 75°03′01″W
  - elevation: 46 m (151 ft)

Basin features
- River system: Saint Lawrence River drainage basin

Cobbs Lake Creek is a creek in Prescott and Russell County in eastern Ontario, Canada, which empties into the South Nation River.

In the early 1900, the Cobb Lake Drainage Scheme reduced a large area covered by water to a tiny little creek. The goal of the project (which cost 60 000$ at the time) was to expend agricultural production and to allow farmers to sow at an earlier date the flooded part of their farms.

Nowadays, Cobbs Lake is a large shallow lake which forms around the creek during the spring thaw. Fields are found around the lake, and these fields are flooded during the early spring expanding the lake even more. This causes problems for local residents since it also floods nearby side roads. Thousands of migrating snow geese, Canada geese, and many dabbling ducks, such as northern shovelers and pintails, stop over in this location during the spring. The heavy clay soils of the region were deposited by the Champlain Sea, a shallow arm of the Atlantic which extended into this region at the end of the last ice age.

== Course ==
The river begins at a field in geographic Clarence Township in the city of Clarence-Rockland and heads southwest, then turns southeast and passes under a former Canadian Pacific Railway line, today the Prescott and Russell Recreational Trail. It briefly passes through the southwest corner of geographic North Plantagenet Township in the municipality of Alfred and Plantagenet, then enters geographic South Plantagenet township in the municipality of The Nation and reaches its mouth at the South Nation River near the community of Pendleton. The South Nation River flows via the Ottawa River to the Saint Lawrence River.

== Sources ==
- Map 11 (PDF) (Map). 1 : 700,000. Official road map of Ontario. Ministry of Transportation of Ontario. 2010-01-01.
- Restructured municipalities - Ontario map #5 (Map). Restructuring Maps of Ontario. Ontario Ministry of Municipal Affairs and Housing. 2006. Archived from the original on 2020-05-11.

== See also ==
- List of rivers of Ontario
