= Larose Forest =

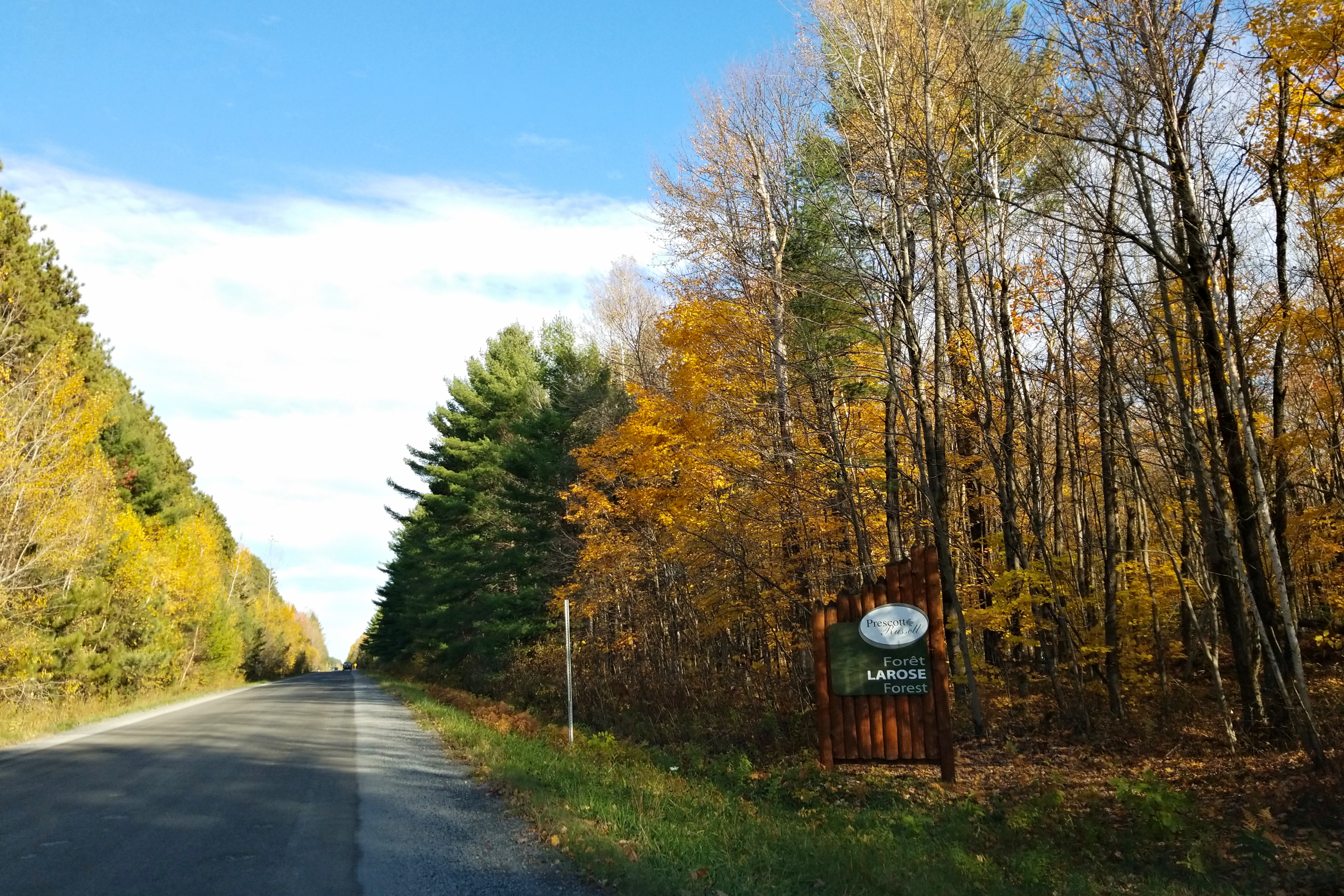
- Interactive map of Larose Forest

Geography
- Location: United Counties of Prescott and Russell, Eastern Ontario, Canada
- Coordinates: 45°22′31″N 75°09′54″W
- Elevation: 61–84 m (200–276 ft)
- Area: 109.45 km^{2} (42.26 sq mi)

Administration
- Authority: United Counties of Prescott and Russell

Larose Forest is a man-made forest in the United Counties of Prescott and Russell, Ontario, Canada. It is about 60 kilometres (37 mi) east of Ottawa, straddling the boundary of Clarence-Rockland and The Nation municipality.

The 10,944.7-hectare (27,045-acre) forest, part of the 71,100,000 hectares (176,000,000 acres) of forest in Ontario, is named after Ferdinand Larose, and is owned and managed by the county. Recreational activities in the multi-purpose forest include hiking, mountain biking, snowshoeing and cross-country skiing, hunting and trapping, animal watching, and horseback, ATV and snowmobile riding. The forest is also used for small-scale logging operations.

The forest is the second-largest man-made forest in southern Ontario and in 2011 was called an "unappreciated world leader as an example of environmental sustainability."

== History ==
All of Eastern Ontario was originally forested with large stands of maple, white cedar, white pine and tamarack, as well as red pine wherever the soil was sandy. Other than trapping for the fur trade, little to no human development occurred and the area remained untouched until the end of the 18th century. This changed in 1805 due to the Napoleonic Wars and demand for lumber for England's navy and shipbuilding, resulting in a rapid growth of the logging industry in the Ottawa River basin. By the mid-19th century, logging reached its peak and the best stands of old-growth pines had been cut. To keep the lumber mills in Lemieux, Fournier, Lalonde, Proulx, Riceville, and St. Isidore operating, smaller trees were also harvested. Additionally, in October 1897 the remaining vegetation was burned in a brush-clearing accident in the now-abandoned ghost town of Grant. This fire consumed large swathes of land from the initial site in a south-eastern direction, destroying the village of Casselman, which was still recovering from another devastating fire just 6 years prior. Much of this land thus became arable and suitable for agriculture, allowing Casselman to recover and rebuild. However, this left most of the county surrounding Grant as a blow-sand desert.

This complete disruption of the ecosystem caused serious problems. Rivers that previously flowed year-round became intermittent or dried up, fires would burn out of control, the sandy soil eroded, and certain animal and plant species completely disappeared while other species proliferated to the point of becoming pests. The area was then known as the Bourget Desert.

To address the problems, a replanting project was initiated in the 1920s, spearheaded by Ferdinand Larose who was the agricultural representative for the Counties of Prescott and Russell. In 1928, Larose persuaded the Russell County Council to purchase 490 hectares (1,200 acres) from private landowners for reforestation in the Bourget Desert, and that same year, the first 40 hectares (99 acres) were planted in red pine, with Leo Lapalm of Bourget as planting foreman. While the county owned the land, management was the responsibility of Ontario Department of Lands and Forests (now Ministry of Natural Resources and Forestry). Additional land was purchased at a rate of about 400 hectares (990 acres) per year between 1945 and 1956.

Tree planting continued throughout the following decades, increasing to about 1 million trees planted annually in the 1940s and 1950s. Initial plantings were mostly red pine, white pine, and white spruce. Poplar, birch, and other deciduous trees were later added. By the 1970s, most of the land had been reforested and planting was reduced to about 200,000 trees per year. By 2016, more than 18 million trees had been planted and the first seedlings planted in 1928 had grown to about 27 metres (89 ft) in height.

In 2000, the management responsibility of the forest reverted to the county. In 1989, Larose Forest won the first Ontario's Forest of the Year award, and in 2007, it was awarded Forest Stewardship Council (FDC) certification.

== Climate ==
Based on the nearest climate station in Russell, the mean annual temperature in Larose Forest is 6.5 °C (43.7 °F) for the period 1981–2010, up from 6.2 °C (43.2 °F) for the period 1971–2000. January is the coldest month of the year (with a daily average temperature of −10.2 °C [13.6 °F]) and July is the warmest month (daily average temperature of 20.8 °C [69.4 °F]).

Annual rainfall is 789.2 millimetres (31.07 in) and snowfall is 191.8 centimetres (75.5 in), for a total precipitation of 981.0 millimetres (38.62 in). Snow cover at the end of January and February was 23 and 22 centimetres (9.1 and 8.7 in) respectively.

Due to this climate, Larose Forest is in plant hardiness zone 5a.

== Ecology ==
Larose Forest is a forested island in the mostly agricultural landscape of the Saint Lawrence Lowlands. It can be divided into three main ecozones: softwood plantings, red maple stands, and wetlands. These areas contain a large variety of mammals, birds, reptiles, amphibians, insects, fish, vascular plants and mushrooms. The most common animals include deer, beavers, moose, turtles, butterflies and birds of prey.

Soils are mostly acidic fine sands of the well-drained Uplands, imperfectly drained Rubicon, and poorly drained Saint-Samuel series, all of which have a classic podzol appearance in undisturbed areas.

=== Flora ===
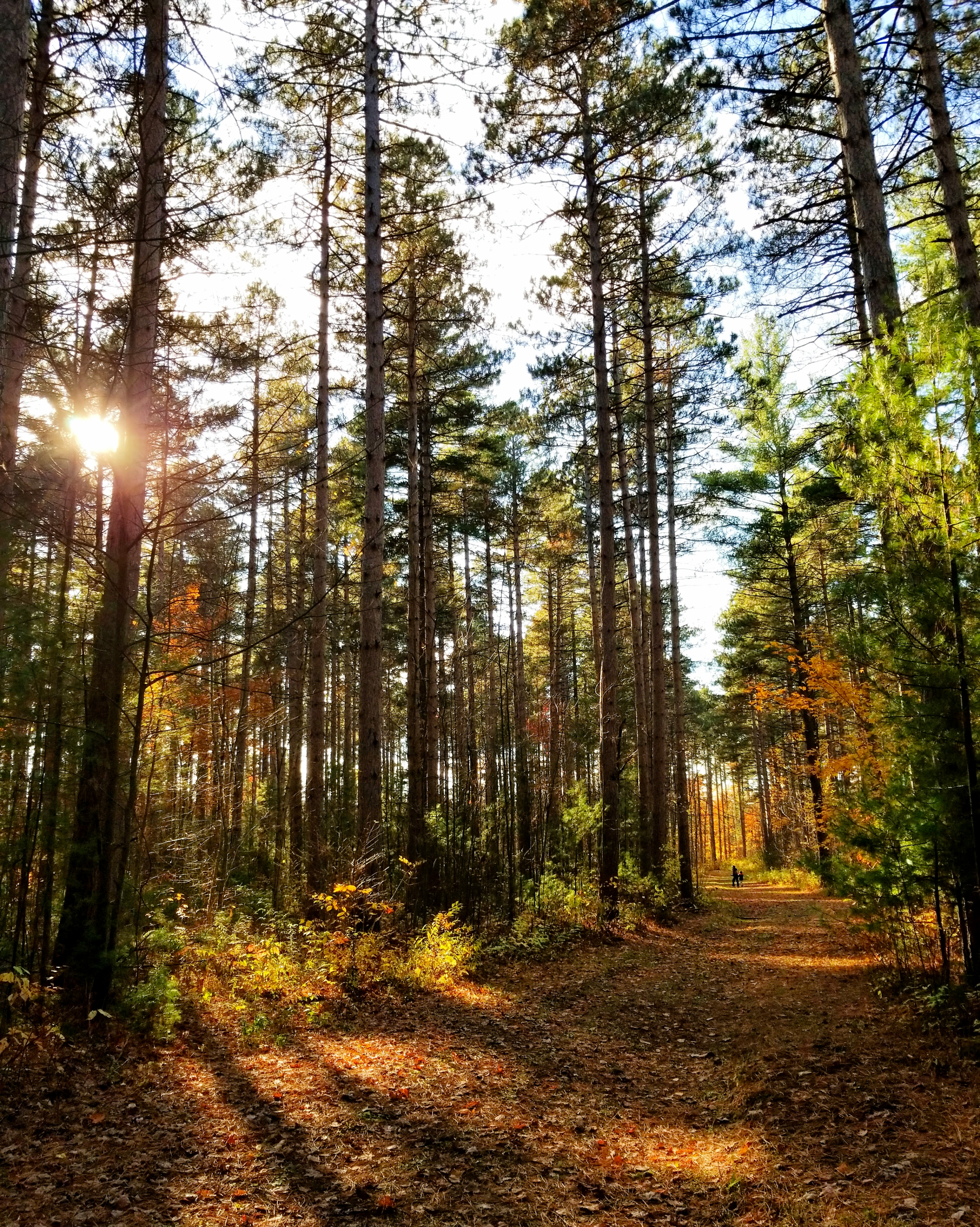
Larose Forest, October 2019

As of April 2015, 673 different vascular plant species have been identified in Larose Forest, including 77 regionally significant species, 8 provincially vulnerable or endangered species, as well as 1 critically endangered species in Ontario (large purple-fringed orchid/Platanthera grandiflora). Additionally, 11 liverwort and 55 moss species are known to be present, of which 6 species are vulnerable in Ontario.

The following are the predominant tree species in Larose Forest:

- Broadleaf (about 30% of forest stands):
  - ash-leaved maple
  - grey birch
  - poplar
  - silver maple
- Coniferous (about 57% of forest stands):
  - larch
  - red pine
  - white pine
  - white spruce

=== Fauna ===
The number of mammal species found in Larose Forest is 29, including big game animals moose (Alces alces), white-tailed deer (Odocoileus virginianus), and American black bear (Ursus americana). Other species include coyote (Canis latrans), red fox (Vulpes vulpes), American mink (Mustela vison), raccoon (Procyon lotor), snowshoe hare (Lepus americanus), and Canadian beaver (Castor canadensis).

The number of moose dropped considerably in the 1990s and 2000s. Whereas in 1994 the density of moose in Larose Forest was 7.0 moose per 10 km^{2}, it had reduced to 2.2 per 10 km^{2} by 2007. In optimal conditions, Larose Forest should be able to sustain more than four times as many moose.

As of September 2016, 144 bird species have been observed in Larose Forest, including 93 which were confirmed to breed in the forest.

As of May 2015, 19 reptile and amphibian species have been observed, including:

- blue-spotted salamander (Ambystoma laterale)
- eastern red-backed salamander (Plethodon cinereus)
- eastern newt (Notophthalmus viridescens)
- gray treefrog (Hyla versicolor)
- American bullfrog (Lithobates catesbeianus)
- green frog (Lithobates clamitans)
- northern leopard frog (Lithobates pipiens)
- wood frog (Lithobates sylvaticus)
- common snapping turtle (Chelydra serpentina) – designated a Species of Special Concern
- Midland painted turtle (Chrysemys picta) – designated a Species of Special Concern
- Blanding's turtle (Emydoidea blandingii) – designated Endangered
- eastern garter snake (Thamnophis sirtalis sirtalis)
- red-bellied snake (Storeria occipitomaculata)

=== Fungi ===
As of September 2007, 506 fungus species have been found in Larose Forest. As of September 2016, 70 species of lichen have been identified, of which 2 are regionally or provincially rare or significant.
