= East Hawkesbury =

- Township (lower-tier)
- Township of East Hawkesbury; Canton de Hawkesbury Est
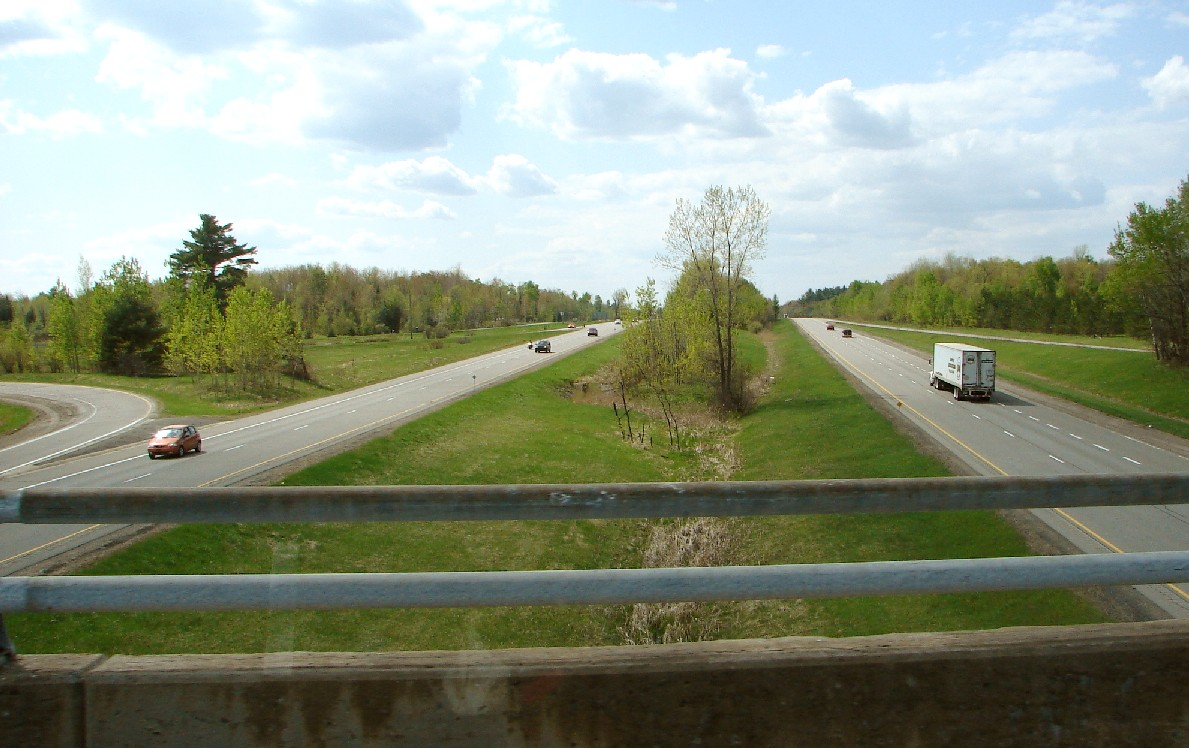
- Highway 417 at East Hawkesbury

- Location within United Counties of Prescott and Russell Location within Southern Ontario
- Coordinates: 45°30′14″N 74°30′00″W
- Country: Canada
- Province: Ontario
- County: Prescott and Russell
- Incorporated: January 1, 1850

Government
  - Mayor: Robert Kirby
  - Fed. riding: Prescott—Russell—Cumberland
  - Prov. riding: Glengarry—Prescott—Russell

Area
  - Land: 235.06 km^{2} (90.76 sq mi)

Population (2021)
  - Total: 3,418
  - Density: 14.5/km^{2} (38/sq mi)
- Time zone: UTC-5 (EST)
  - Summer (DST): UTC-4 (EDT)
- Postal Code FSA: K0B
- Area codes: 613, 343, 450, 579
- Website: www.easthawkesbury.ca

East Hawkesbury is a township in eastern Ontario, Canada, in the United Counties of Prescott and Russell. Situated on the Ottawa River, its eastern boundary is the border with the province of Quebec.

== Communities ==
The township comprises the villages of Chute-à-Blondeau, Sainte-Anne-de-Prescott and Saint-Eugène, as well as the smaller communities of Barb, Glen Andrew, Golden Hill, La Renouche, St. Davids, and Stardale.

The township administrative offices are located in Saint-Eugène.

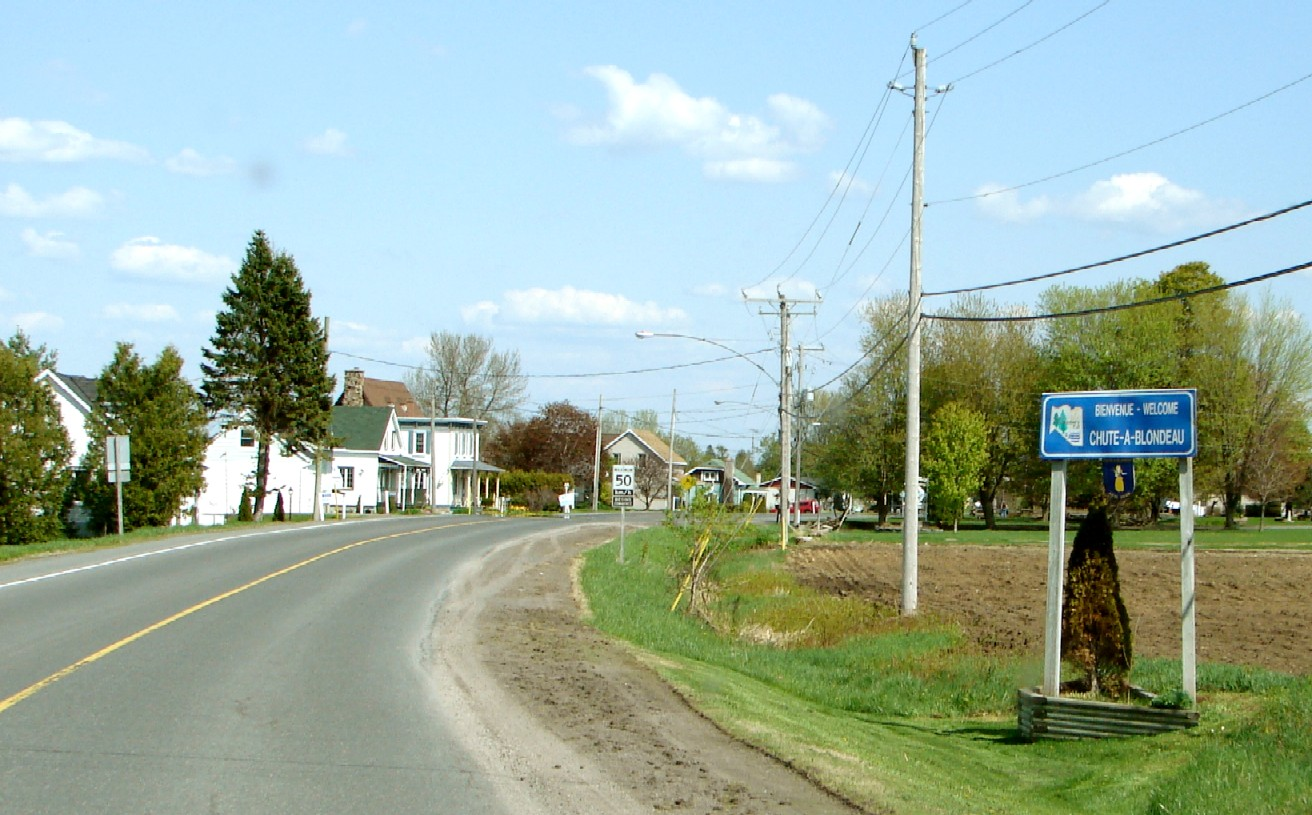
Chute-à-Blondeau

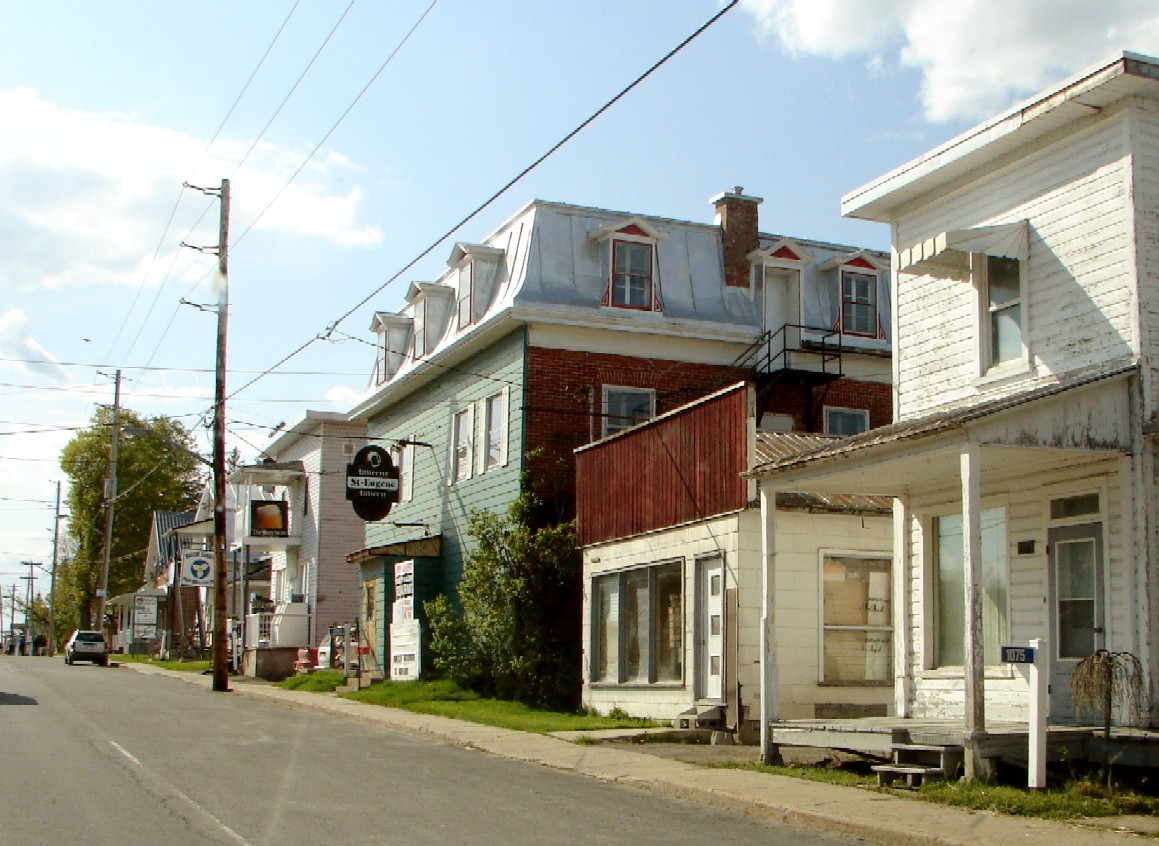
St. Eugene

== Demographics ==
In the 2021 Census of Population conducted by Statistics Canada, East Hawkesbury had a population of 3,418 living in 1,425 of its 1,507 total private dwellings, a change of 3.7% from its 2016 population of 3,296. With a land area of 235.06 km^{2} (90.76 sq mi), it had a population density of 14.5/km^{2} (37.7/sq mi) in 2021.

Canada census – East Hawkesbury community profile

| | 2021 | 2016 | 2011 |
| Population | 3,418 (+3.7% from 2016) | 3,296 (-1.2% from 2011) | 3,335 (-1.0% from 2006) |
| Land area | 235.06 km^{2} (90.76 sq mi) | 235.01 km^{2} (90.74 sq mi) | 235.18 km^{2} (90.80 sq mi) |
| Population density | 14.5/km^{2} (38/sq mi) | 14.0/km^{2} (36/sq mi) | 14.2/km^{2} (37/sq mi) |
| Median age | 50.8 (M: 50.4, F: 51.2) | 49.8 (M: 50.3, F: 49.4) | 46.9 (M: 47.4, F: 46.4) |
| Private dwellings | 1,507 (total) 1,425 (occupied) | 1,482 (total) | 1,386 (total) |
| Median household income | $81,000 | $66,752 | $66,310 |

References: 2021 2016 2011

Historical census populations – East Hawkesbury

| Year | Pop. | ±% |
|---|---|---|
| 1871 | 4,611 | — |
| 1881 | 5,082 | +10.2% |
| 1891 | 4,896 | −3.7% |
| 1901 | 4,621 | −5.6% |
| 1911 | 4,041 | −12.6% |
| 1921 | 3,855 | −4.6% |
| 1931 | 3,631 | −5.8% |
| 1941 | 3,465 | −4.6% |

| Year | Pop. | ±% |
|---|---|---|
| 1951 | 3,231 | −6.8% |
| 1956 | 3,231 | +0.0% |
| 1961 | 3,163 | −2.1% |
| 1966 | 2,835 | −10.4% |
| 1971 | 2,842 | +0.2% |
| 1976 | 2,895 | +1.9% |
| 1981 | 2,968 | +2.5% |
| 1986 | 2,788 | −6.1% |

| Year | Pop. | ±% |
|---|---|---|
| 1991 | 3,159 | +13.3% |
| 1996 | 3,296 | +4.3% |
| 2001 | 3,415 | +3.6% |
| 2006 | 3,368 | −1.4% |
| 2011 | 3,335 | −1.0% |
| 2016 | 3,296 | −1.2% |
| 2021 | 3,418 | +3.7% |

Source: Statistics Canada

== See also ==
- List of townships in Ontario
- List of francophone communities in Ontario
