= Saint-Eugène, Ontario =

Saint-Eugène
- Unincorporated community
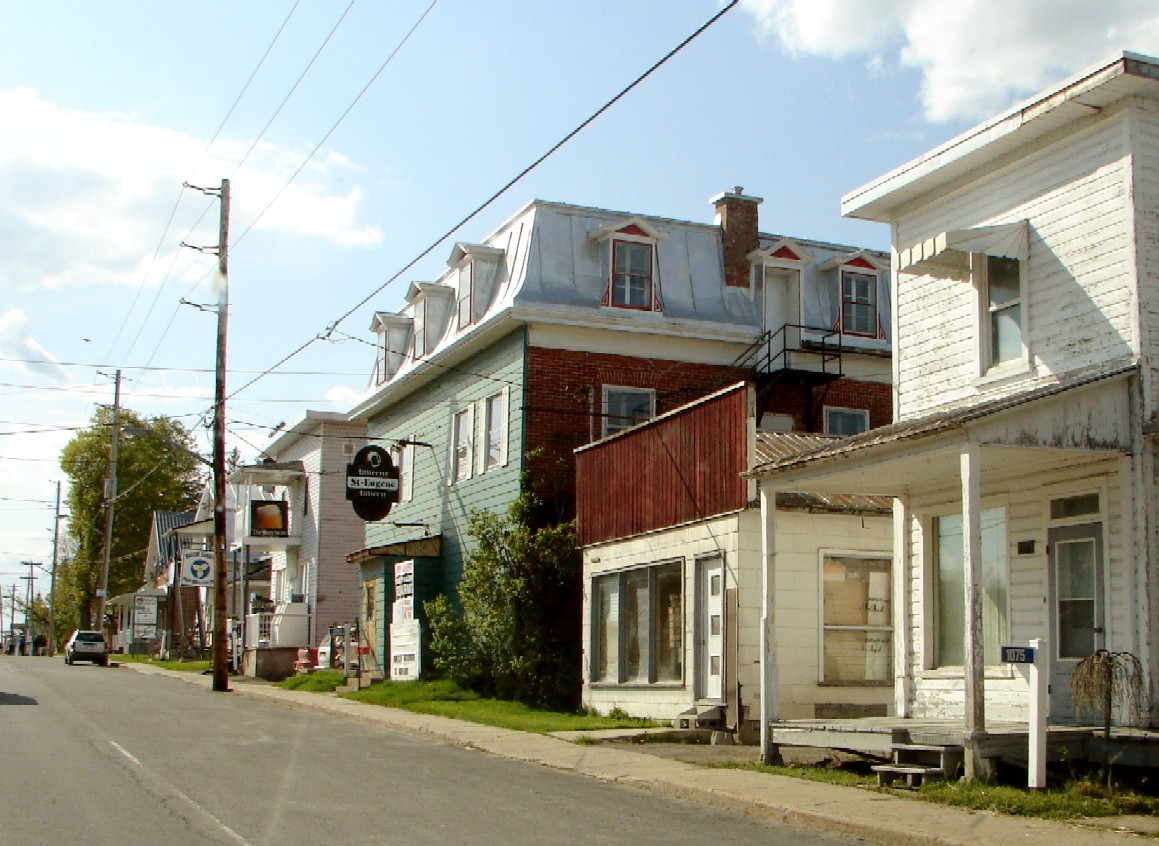

- Location in Ontario
- Coordinates: 45°30′N 74°28′W
- Country: Canada
- Province: Ontario
- County: Prescott and Russell
- Municipality: East Hawkesbury
- Time zone: UTC-5 (EST)
  - Summer (DST): UTC-4 (EDT)
- Postal code: K0B 1P0
- Area code(s): 613, 343

Saint-Eugène (officially spelled St-Eugène; French pronunciation: [sɛ̃t‿øʒɛn]) is a rural, Franco-Ontarian locality situated in the Township of East Hawkesbury, within the United Counties of Prescott and Russell in Ontario (Canada). It is just west of the interprovincial border with Quebec, near Highway 417 between Ottawa and Montreal.

== Geography ==
The village of St-Eugène is located in the St. Lawrence Lowlands. The water for the village is supplied by the Rigaud River, a tributary of the Ottawa River.

St-Eugène is crossed from east to west by Labrosse Street (County Road 10), which is the main street of the village. This road goes east towards the Haut-de-la Chute and the village of Rigaud, Quebec.

== History ==
The parish of St-Eugène was founded in 1855.

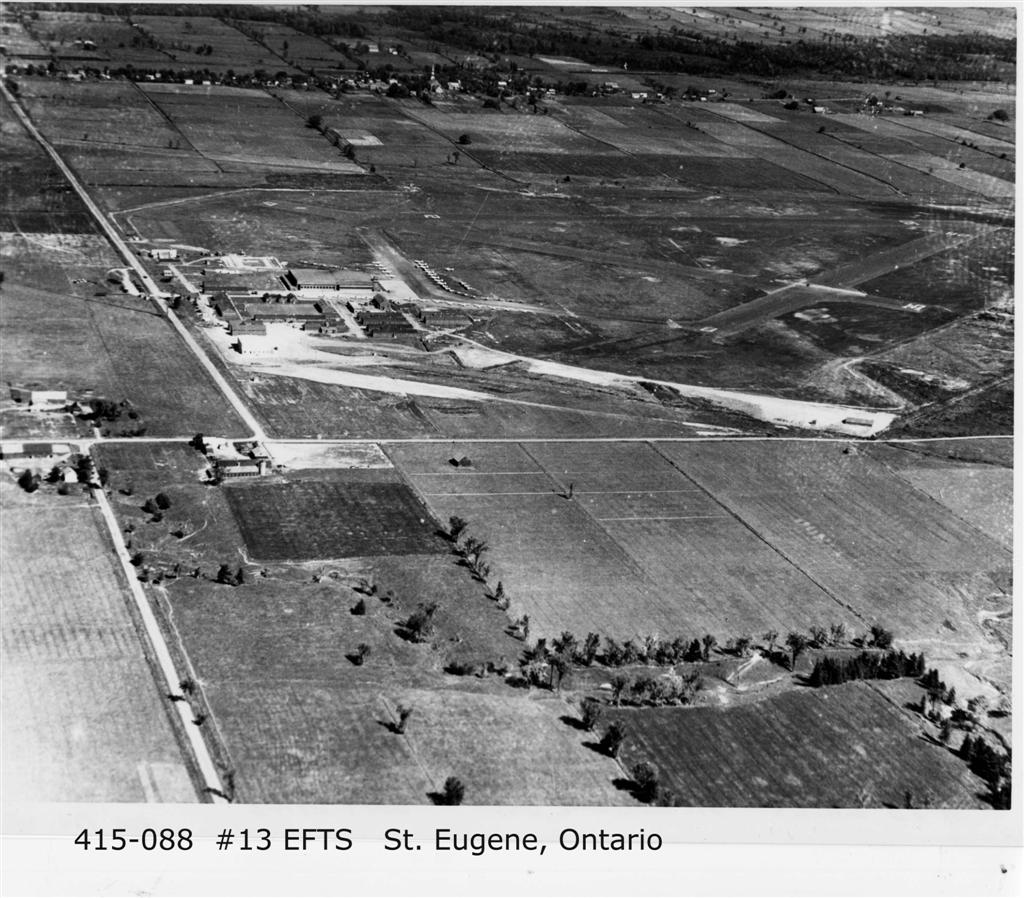
Aerial photograph of 13 EFTS St. Eugene during the second world war.

From 1940 to 1945, during World War II, the Royal Canadian Air Force built and operated No. 13 Elementary Flying Training School (EFTS) as a component of the British Commonwealth Air Training Plan (BCATP). Operating Fleet Finch and Fairchild Cornell training aircraft, the flying school was located roughly a kilometre south of town (45°29′17″N 074°28′17″W). The school opened on 28 October 1940 and closed on 19 June 1945. Motorsport took place in the 1950s and 1960s before the airfield was completely abandoned. Today, nothing remains of the airfield but the faint outlines of its overgrown runways. The flying school also maintained a relief landing field near Hawkesbury. The former relief field is now known as Hawkesbury Airport.

== Politics and administration ==
St-Eugène is part of the Township of East Hawkesbury, a lower-tier municipality within the United Counties of Prescott and Russell. The administrative services of the municipality are all located in Saint-Eugène. The village is in the federal riding of Glengarry—Prescott—Russell and the provincial riding of Glengarry—Prescott—Russell.

== Economy ==
The economy of St-Eugène is primarily agricultural. The village has several dairy farms, alongside cows and goats. In addition to agricultural activity there is some local or specialized trade. For example, the Skelly Gallery and the service centre of the credit union in the Valley.

== Society ==
Basic services in the community include the French Catholic elementary school, Curé-Labrosse. Places of worship include the Catholic Church of St. Eugene. The postal code is K0B 1P0. The Community Centre Access St. Eugene, allows local people to become familiar with information technology and communications and have Internet access.

At the starting point of the Prescott and Russell Recreational Trail in St-Eugène, hikers have a pavilion and parking. This trail is 72 km long and occupies the corridor of a former Canadian Pacific Railway line that carried The Canadian prior to 1982. It is open all year to cyclists, walkers, riders and snowmobilers.

== Culture ==
The Skelly Gallery exhibits several artists like painters Bernard Gauthier Pugin, John Greenwald, Brenda Kennedy, Freda Pemberton Smith and Odile Stubborn, photographers Mark Greenwald and Robert Slatkoff and sculptors Elizabeth Skelly and Susan Valyi.

== Sports ==
In the winter months, the town has an outdoor skating rink that locals use to play hockey and ice skate.

There is also a baseball field for summer months.

== Notable people ==
- Nathaniel Larouche
