= Champlain, Ontario =

Township in Ontario, Canada

Champlain
- Township (lower-tier)
- Township of Champlain / Canton de Champlain
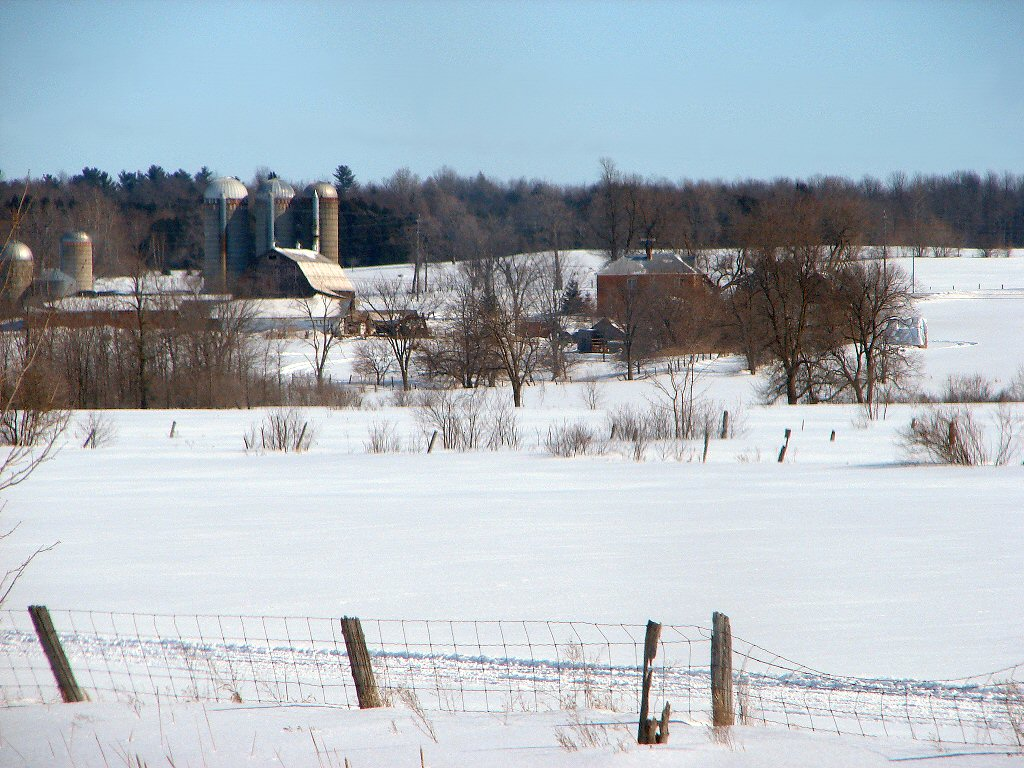

- Location within United Counties of Prescott and Russell Location within Southern Ontario
- Coordinates: 45°34′00″N 74°40′30″W
- Country: Canada
- Province: Ontario
- County: Prescott and Russell
- Formed: January 1, 1998

Government
  - Mayor: Normand Riopel
  - Federal riding: Prescott—Russell—Cumberland
  - Prov. riding: Glengarry—Prescott—Russell

Area
  - Land: 207.02 km^{2} (79.93 sq mi)

Population (2021)
  - Total: 8,665
  - Density: 41.9/km^{2} (109/sq mi)
- Time zone: UTC-5 (EST)
  - Summer (DST): UTC-4 (EDT)
- Postal Code FSA: K0B
- Area codes: 613, 343
- Website: www.champlain.ca

Champlain is a township in eastern Ontario, Canada, in the United Counties of Prescott and Russell on the Ottawa River. It was formed on January 1, 1998, through the amalgamation of West Hawkesbury Township, Longueuil Township, the Town of Vankleek Hill, and the Village of L'Orignal.

== Communities ==
The township comprises the communities of Aberdeen, Cassburn, Green Lane, Happy Hollow, Henrys Corners, L'Ange-Gardien, L'Orignal, Pleasant Corners, Ritchance, Riviera Estate, Sandy Hill, Springhill, Vankleek Hill, Vankleek Hill Station, Village Lanthier, and St. Eugene.

The township administrative offices are located in Vankleek Hill.

== Demographics ==
In the 2021 Census of Population conducted by Statistics Canada, Champlain had a population of 8,665 living in 3,750 of its 3,964 total private dwellings, a change of −0.5% from its 2016 population of 8,706. With a land area of 207.02 km^{2} (79.93 sq mi), it had a population density of 41.9/km^{2} (108.4/sq mi) in 2021.

Canada census – Champlain community profile

	2021	2016	2011
Population	8,665 (-0.5% from 2016)	8,706 (+1.6% from 2011)	8,573 (-1.3% from 2006)
Land area	207.02 km^{2} (79.93 sq mi)	207.27 km^{2} (80.03 sq mi)	207.24 km^{2} (80.02 sq mi)
Population density	41.9/km^{2} (109/sq mi)	42.0/km^{2} (109/sq mi)	41.4/km^{2} (107/sq mi)
Median age	52.4 (M: 52.0, F: 53.2)	50.8 (M: 50.4, F: 51.1)
Private dwellings	3,964 (total) 3,750 (occupied)	3,910 (total)	3,769 (total)
Median household income	$83,000	$72,521

References: 2021 2016 2011

Historical census populations – Champlain, Ontario

Year	Pop.	±%
1996	8,375	—
2001	8,591	+2.6%
2006	8,683	+1.1%

Year	Pop.	±%
2011	8,573	−1.3%
2016	8,706	+1.6%
2021	8,665	−0.5%

Source: Statistics Canada

== See also ==
- List of townships in Ontario
- List of francophone communities in Ontario
