= Marc Dorion =

Canadian ice sledge hockey player

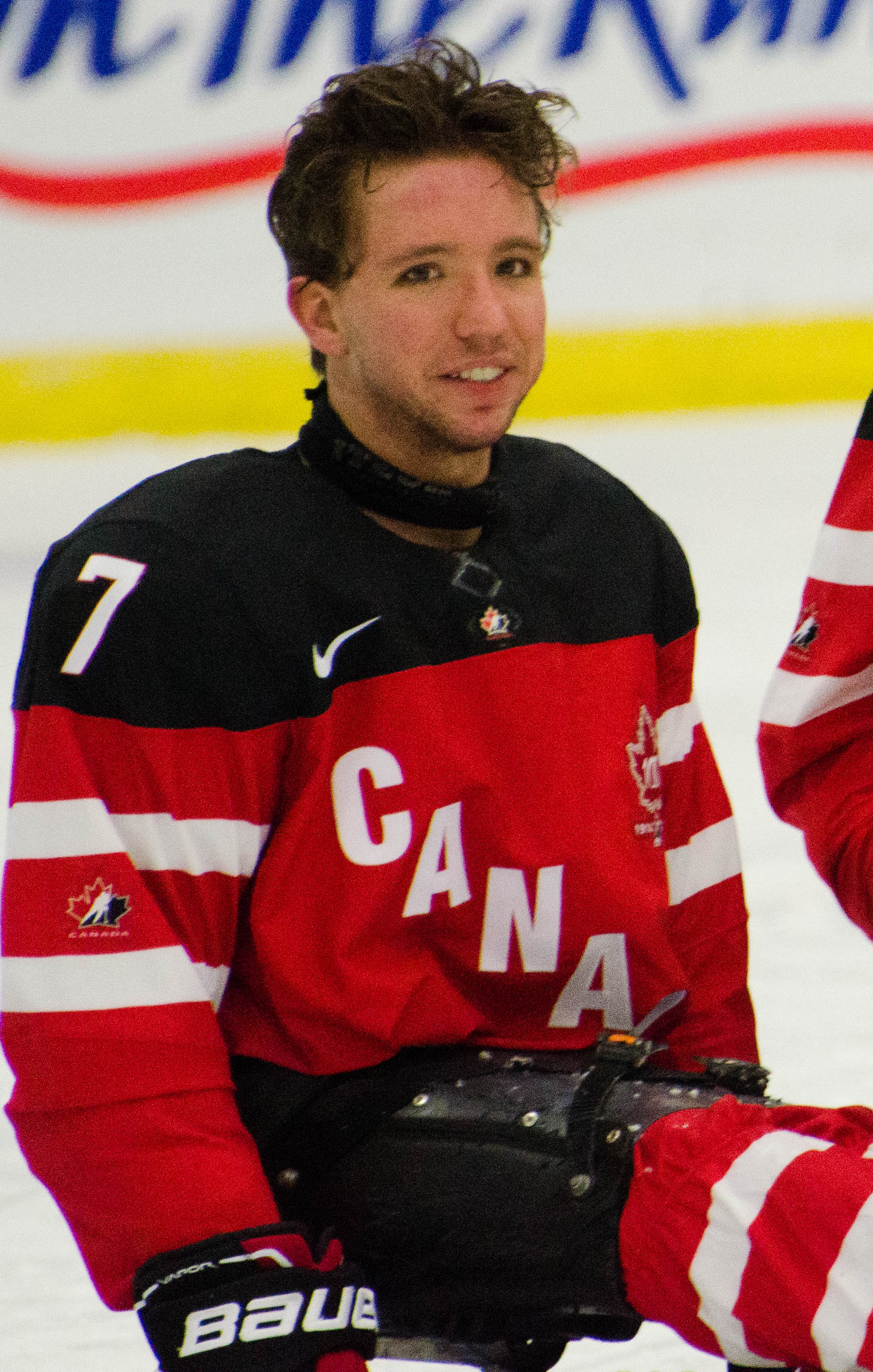
- Dorion in 2015
- Born: June 22, 1987 (age 39) Bourget, Ontario, Canada
- Height: 5 ft 0 in (152 cm)
- Weight: 137 lb (62 kg; 9 st 11 lb)
- Position: Forward
- National team: Canada
- Playing career: 2004–present
Medal record
Para ice hockey
Representing Canada
Paralympic Games
| Gold medal – first place | 2006 Torino | Team |
| Bronze medal – third place | 2014 Sochi | Team |
World Championships
| Gold medal – first place | 2008 Marlborough | Team |
| Gold medal – first place | 2013 Goyang | Team |
| Silver medal – second place | 2015 Buffalo | Team |
| Bronze medal – third place | 2009 Ostrava | Team |
| Bronze medal – third place | 2012 Hamar | Team |

Marc Dorion (born June 22, 1987) is a Canadian ice sledge hockey player.

He was born with spina bifida, which meant he could not use his legs. He began to play ice sledge hockey when he was 4, at the Children's Hospital of Eastern Ontario, and has continued in the sport ever since.

He won gold at the 2006 Paralympics when he was 19, and was the team's youngest member. He has played for the Canadian national team since he was 16.

== Honours ==
- 2010 Winter Paralympics
  - 4th place
- 2009 IPC Ice Sledge Hockey World Championships
  - Bronze
- 2008 IPC Ice Sledge Hockey World Championships
  - Gold
- 2006 Winter Paralympics
  - Gold
- 2004 IPC Ice Sledge Hockey World Championships
  - 4th place
