= L'Orignal =

Franco-Ontarian village in Ontario, Canada

- Unincorporated community
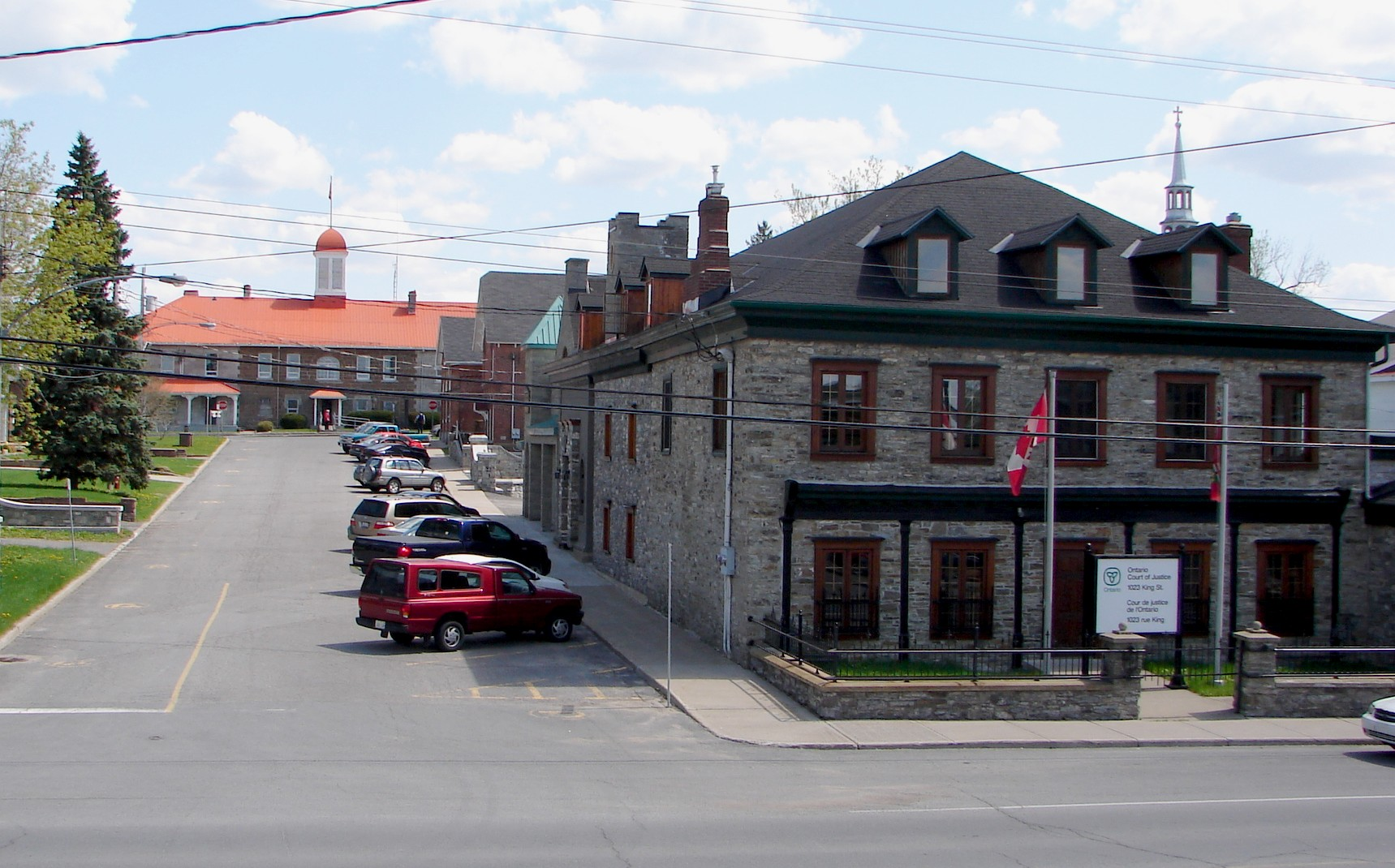

- Location within Southern Ontario
- Coordinates: 45°37′10″N 74°41′30″W
- Country: Canada
- Province: Ontario
- County: Prescott and Russell
- Municipality: Champlain
- Settled: 1800
- Incorporated: 1876
- Dissolved (amalgamated): January 1, 1997

Government
  - Fed. riding: Prescott—Russell—Cumberland
  - Prov. riding: Glengarry—Prescott—Russell

Area
  - Land: 2.91 km^{2} (1.12 sq mi)
- Elevation: 50 m (165 ft)

Population (2021)
  - Total: 1,359
  - Density: 467.6/km^{2} (1,211/sq mi)
- Time zone: UTC-5 (EST)
  - Summer (DST): UTC-4 (EDT)
- Postal code: K0B 1K0
- Area codes: 613, 343

L'Orignal (/ˌlɒrɪnˈjæl/) is a Franco-Ontarian village and former municipality, now part of Champlain Township in eastern Ontario, Canada. Its population in 2021 was 1,359. L'Orignal likely took its name from its location on the Ottawa River once known as Pointe à l'Orignal (French for "Moose Point"), where moose crossed the river. It was one of the seigneuries of New France.

It is now the county seat of Prescott and Russell United Counties.

== History ==
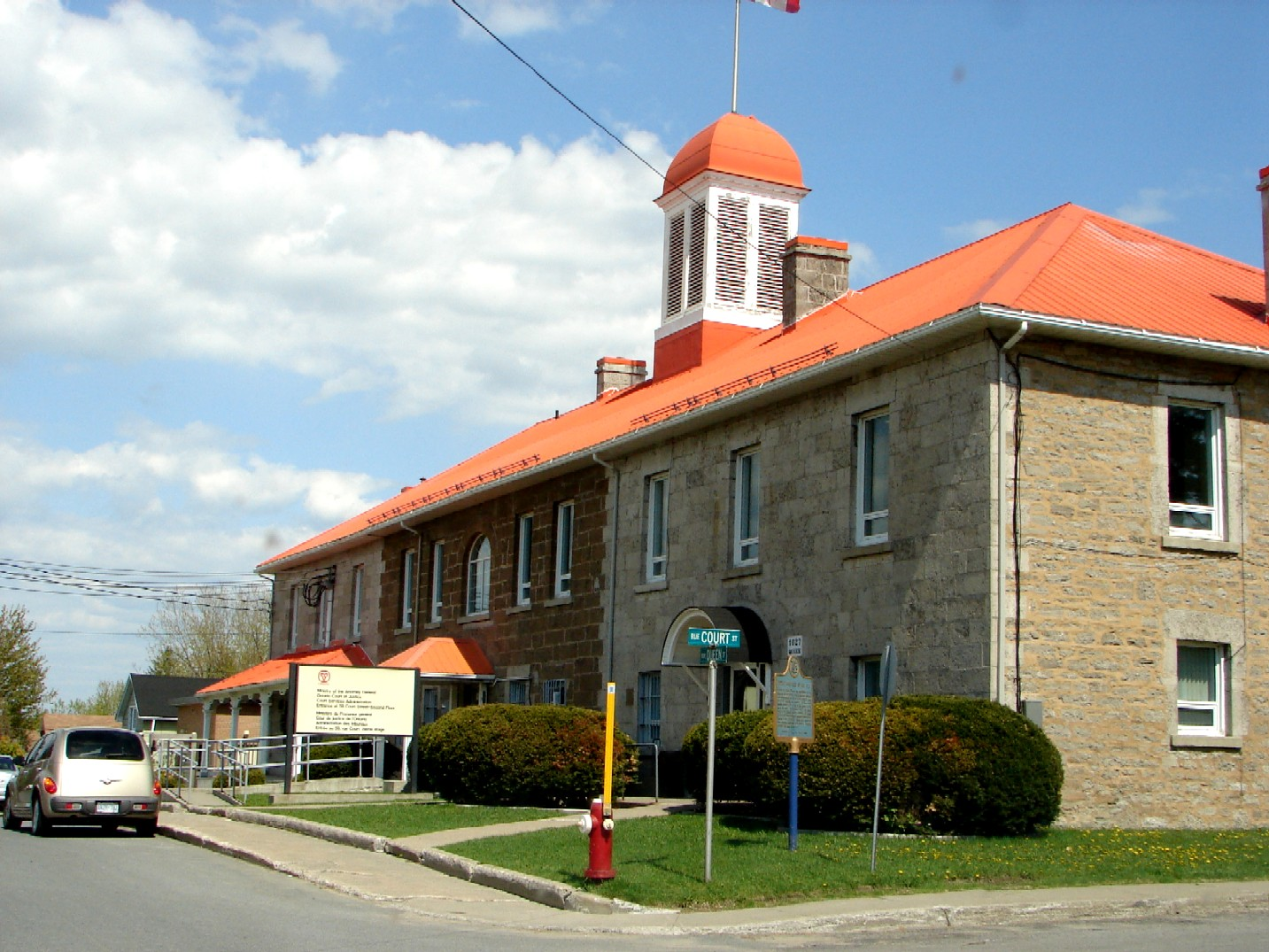
L'Orignal Courthouse and Jail, built in 1825

In 1674, the Company of New France granted the Seigneurie de L'Orignac to François Prévost. Through inheritance, the Seigneurie eventually passed on to the de Longueuil family, owners of several seigneuries. It was one of the two seigneuries the King of France granted in present-day Ontario, along with La Salle's Seigneurie de Cataraqui (now Kingston). As part of New France, the area was ceded to Great Britain in 1763. In 1791, with the creation of Upper Canada (Ontario) and Lower Canada (Quebec), the seigneurie became part of Upper Canada.

In 1798, Nathan Treadwell, of Plattsburgh, New York, purchased 230,000 acres (930 km^{2}) of seigneurial land. The government confiscated the property during the War of 1812 and returned it to his son in 1823. In 1816, the Village of L'Orignal was chosen as the district town for the Ottawa District. The Ottawa District Courthouse, built in L'Orignal in 1825, is still in use. The decommissioned L'Orignal Jail is now a museum. L'Orignal Parish was established in 1836 as the first Catholic parish in Prescott County.

The village was incorporated in 1876.

On January 1, 1998, the Village of L'Orignal, together with the Town of Vankleek Hill and the Townships of Hawkesbury West and Longueuil, was amalgamated into the new Township of Champlain.

== Geography ==
According to Statistics Canada, the former village had a total area of 5.68 square kilometres (2.19 sq mi). It is located along the south banks of the Ottawa River.

== Demographics ==
Historical census populations – L'Orignal
(Village 1876–1997, Population centre 1998–...)

Year	Pop.	±%
1881	853	—
1891	1,002	+17.5%
1901	1,026	+2.4%
1911	1,347	+31.3%
1921	1,298	−3.6%
1931	1,121	−13.6%
1941	1,118	−0.3%
1951	967	−13.5%

Year	Pop.	±%
1956	1,067	+10.3%
1961	1,189	+11.4%
1966	1,238	+4.1%
1971	1,405	+13.5%
1976	1,380	−1.8%
1981	1,819	+31.8%
1986	1,914	+5.2%
1991	2,164	+13.1%

Year	Pop.	±%
1996	1,999	−7.6%
2001	2,033	+1.7%
2006	2,072	+1.9%
2011	2,068	−0.2%
2016	1,450	−29.9%
2021	1,359	−6.3%

Population counts are not adjusted for boundary changes.
Source: Statistics Canada
