= St. Isidore, Ontario =

Community in Ontario, Canada

St. Isidore
- Unincorporated community
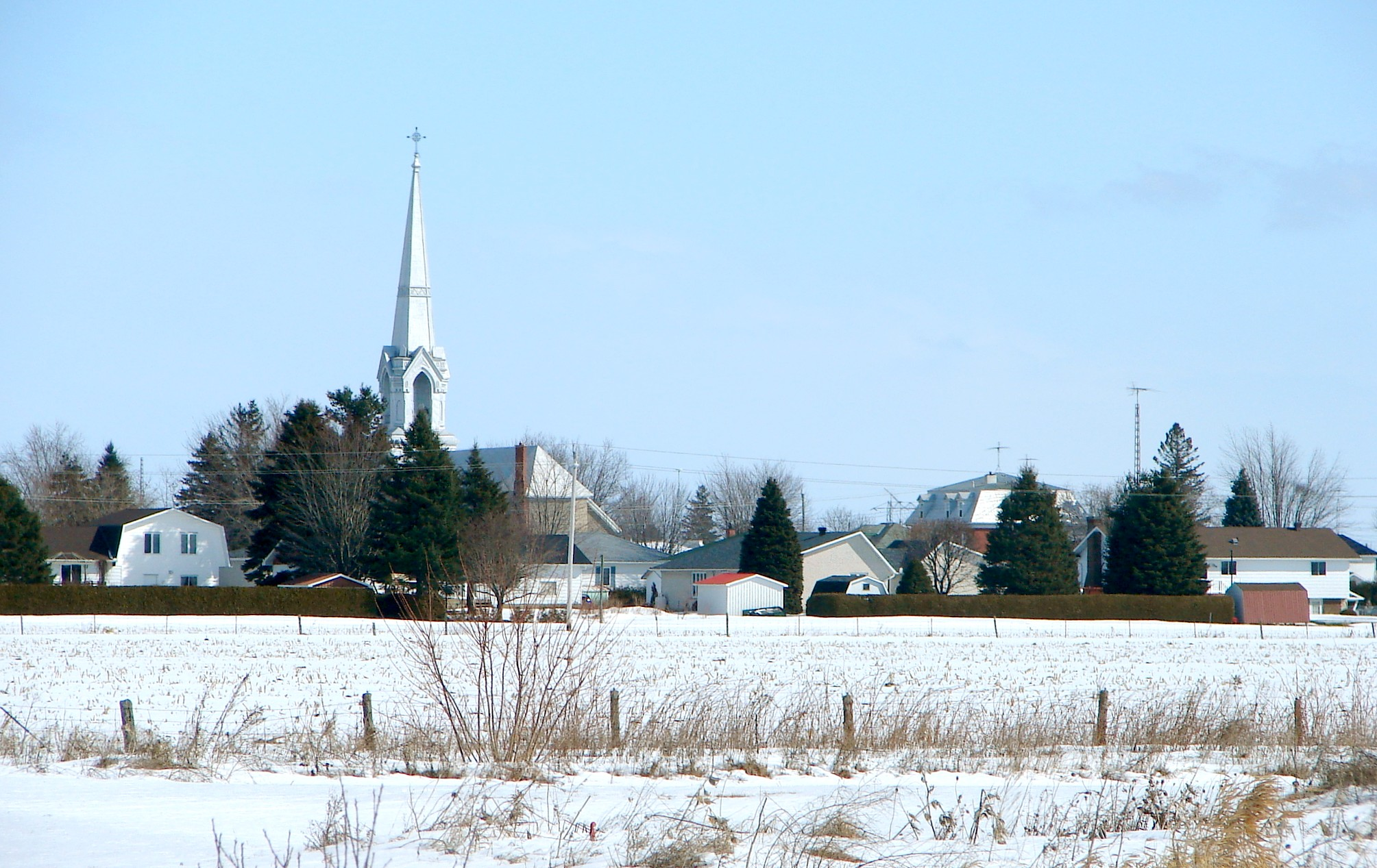

- Location within Southern Ontario
- Coordinates: 45°23′06″N 74°54′20″W
- Country: Canada
- Province: Ontario
- County: Prescott and Russell
- Municipality: The Nation
- Settled: 1845
- Incorporated: 1965
- Dissolved (amalgamated): January 1, 1998

Government
  - Fed. riding: Prescott—Russell—Cumberland
  - Prov. riding: Glengarry—Prescott—Russell

Area
  - Land: 1.17 km^{2} (0.45 sq mi)

Population (2021)
  - Total: 892
  - Density: 763.4/km^{2} (1,977/sq mi)
- Time zone: UTC-5 (EST)
  - Summer (DST): UTC-4 (EDT)
- Postal code: K0C 2B0
- Area codes: 613, 343

St. Isidore (formerly known as St. Isidore de Prescott) is a community in The Nation Municipality in the United Counties of Prescott and Russell in Ontario, Canada. A designated place, St. Isidore had a population of 892 in the 2021 Canadian census.

The town was originally called St. Isidore de Prescott, but in 1989, the name was shortened to St. Isidore. The community became an incorporated village in 1965 when it separated from Caledonia and South Plantagenet Township. However, the incorporated village was short-lived and became part of The Nation Municipality on January 1, 1998, along with the Townships of Caledonia, Cambridge, and South Plantagenet.

St-Isidore has a French elementary school (Kindergarten to 6) called L'école Catholique de St-Isidore . The school has between 200 and 300 students.

A 24 megawatt solar power plant is located near the town.

The St-Isidore Catholic Church, built in 1879 was destroyed by fire on July 23, 2016.

== Demographics ==
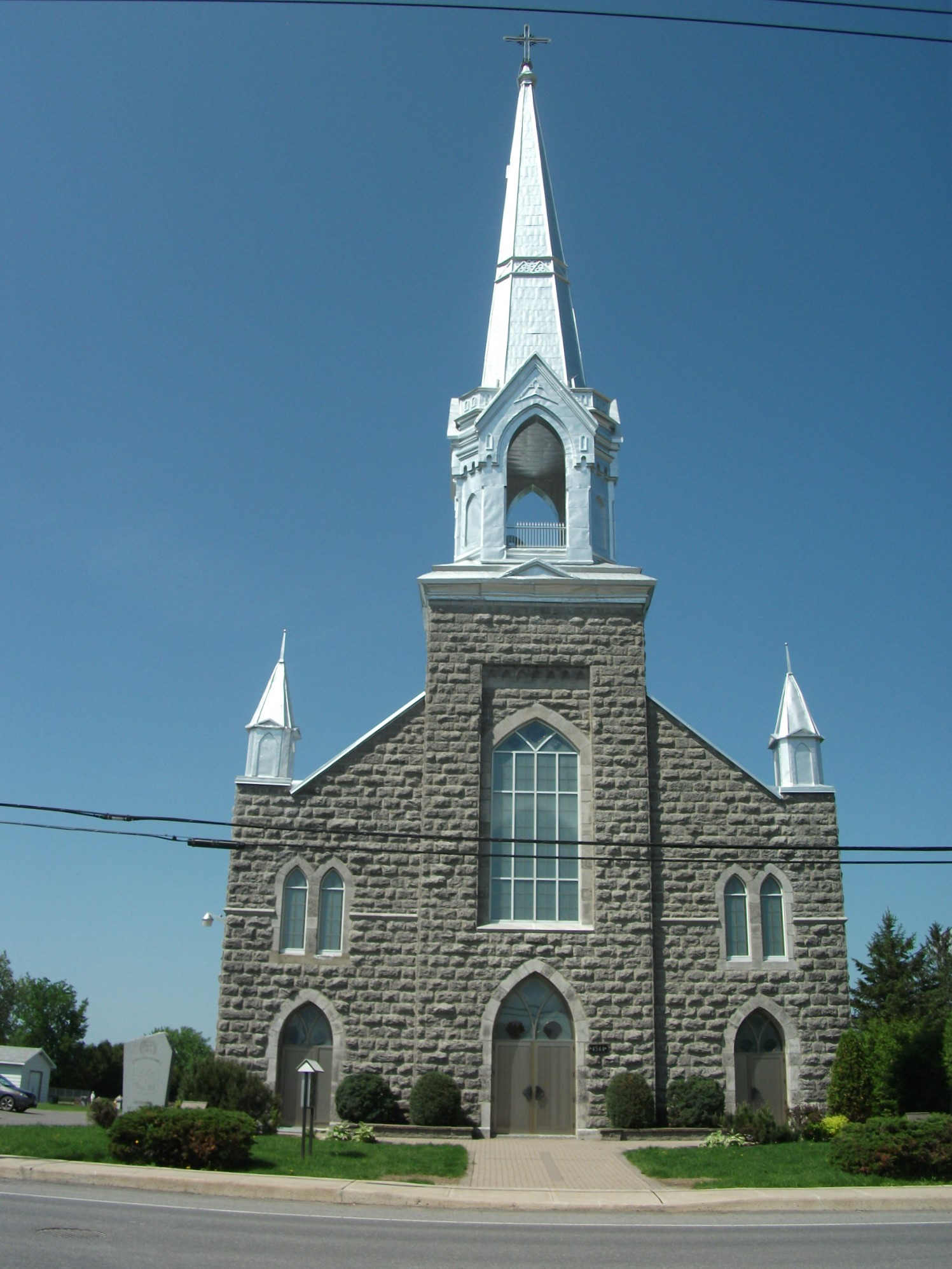
Church in St. Isidore, Ontario

In the 2021 Census of Population conducted by Statistics Canada, St. Isidore had a population of 892 living in 370 of its 385 total private dwellings, a change of 10.8% from its 2016 population of 805. With a land area of 1.17 km^{2} (0.45 sq mi), it had a population density of 762.4/km^{2} (1,974.6/sq mi) in 2021.

Statistics from 2011 census:

- Population in 2011: 752
- Total private dwellings: 330
- Land area (square km): 1.15
- Population density per square km: 652.4
- Median age of the population: 45.1
- Total number of occupied private dwellings by structural type of dwelling: 315
- Single-detached house: 225
- Other dwelling: 15
- Apartment, duplex: 10
- Apartment, building that has fewer than five storeys: 55

| Mother tongue (2021) | Population | Percentage |
|---|---|---|
| English | 190 | 22.2% |
| French | 610 | 71.3% |
| English and French | 25 | 2.9% |

Historical census populations – St. Isidore
(Village 1965–1997, Designated place 1998–...)

| Year | Pop. | ±% |
|---|---|---|
| 1966 | 530 | — |
| 1971 | 615 | +16.0% |
| 1976 | 689 | +12.0% |
| 1981 | 746 | +8.3% |
| 1986 | 708 | −5.1% |
| 1991 | 755 | +6.6% |

| Year | Pop. | ±% |
|---|---|---|
| 1996 | 766 | +1.5% |
| 2001 | 722 | −5.7% |
| 2006 | 751 | +4.0% |
| 2011 | 752 | +0.1% |
| 2016 | 805 | +7.0% |
| 2021 | 892 | +10.8% |

Population counts are not adjusted for boundary changes.
Source: Statistics Canada

== Notable people ==
- Royal Galipeau - politician
- Valérie Grenier - Canadian alpine ski racer who competed in the 2018, 2022, and 2026 Winter Olympics
- Benoît Pouliot - professional ice hockey player
- Francis Wathier - professional ice hockey player
