= United Counties of Prescott and Russell =

Prescott and Russell
- United counties (upper-tier)
- United Counties of Prescott and Russell; Comtés unis de Prescott et Russell (French)
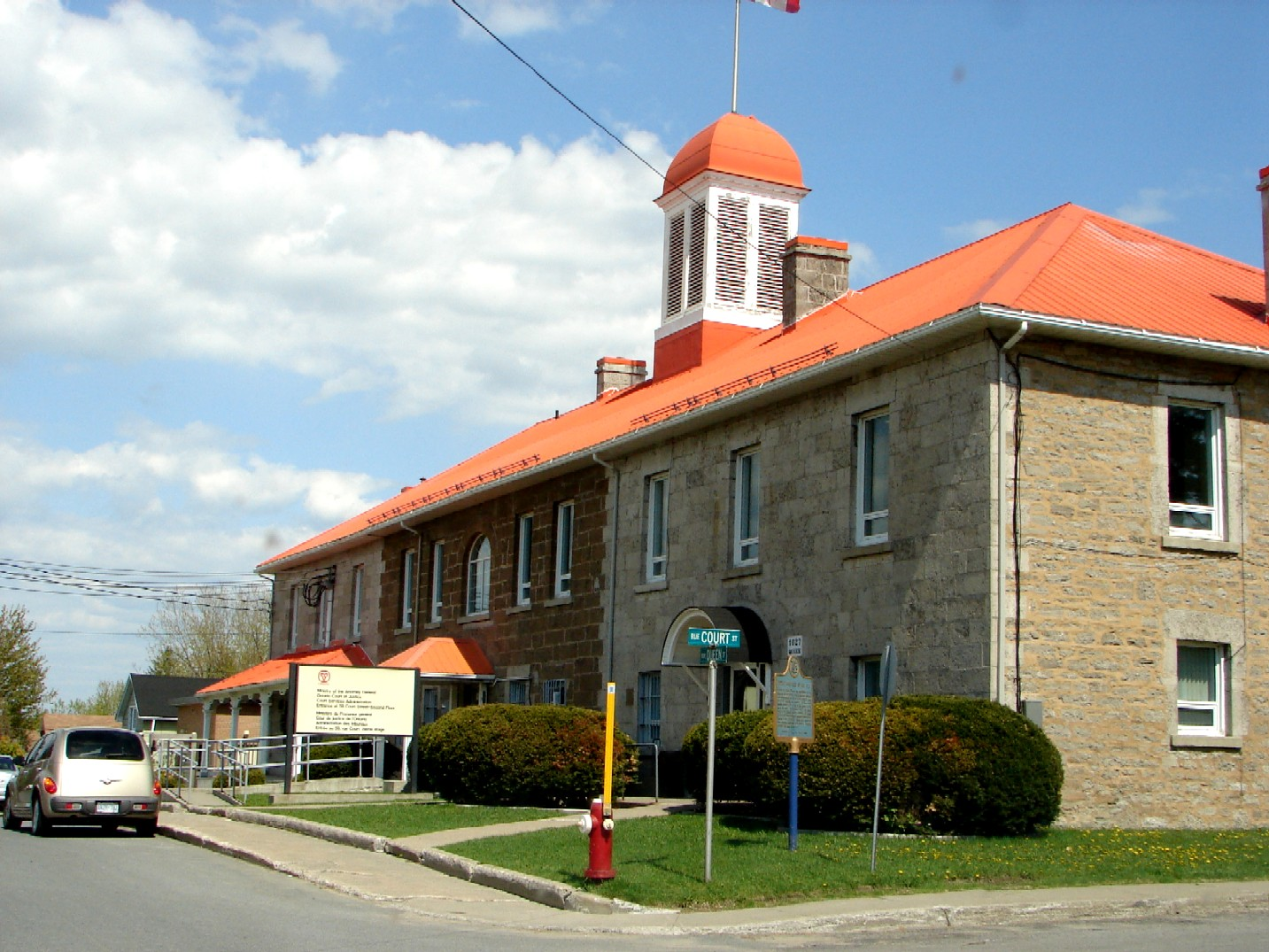
- County Court in L'Orignal
- Motto: Sic Dat Diligentia Terra ("Thus the Earth Gives Diligence ")
- Location of Prescott & Russell counties
- Coordinates: 45°28′N 74°50′W
- Country: Canada
- Province: Ontario
- Region: Eastern Ontario
- Established: 1820
- County seat: L'Orignal
- Municipalities: List: Alfred and Plantagenet (township); Casselman (municipality); Champlain (township); Clarence-Rockland (city); East Hawkesbury (township); Hawkesbury (town); Russell (township); The Nation (municipality)

Government
  - Warden: Normand Riopel
  - Governing body: Prescott and Russell County Council
  - MP: Giovanna Mingarelli
  - MPP: Stéphane Sarrazin

Area
  - Land: 2,004.27 km^{2} (773.85 sq mi)

Population (2021)
  - Total: 95,639
  - Density: 47.7/km^{2} (124/sq mi)
- Time zone: UTC-5 (EST)
  - Summer (DST): UTC-4 (EDT)
- Website: www.prescott-russell.on.ca

The United Counties of Prescott and Russell (French: Comtés unis de Prescott et Russell) is a county located in the Canadian province of Ontario. Its county seat is L'Orignal. It is located in Eastern Ontario, in the wedge-shaped area between the Ottawa River and St. Lawrence River, approximately 55 kilometres (34 mi) east of the City of Ottawa.

The county was created as a result of a merger between Russell County and Prescott County in 1820. Under Ontario law, the county is an Upper-tier Municipality.

== Geography ==
According to Statistics Canada, the county has a total area of 2,004.27 square kilometres (773.85 sq mi).

The county is bordered by the Ontario/Québec border to the east, and the Ottawa River to the north. It is crossed by the South Nation River that connects the Larose Forest and Alfred Bog. Ontario Ministry of Natural Resources has designated the Alfred Bog "a provincially significant wetland and an Area of Natural and Scientific Interest." Species of interest include the palm warbler, northern pitcher-plant, pink lady's-slipper, cottongrass, bog elfin and bog copper butterflies, and ebony boghaunter dragonfly. It also hosts one of the most southerly herds of moose. The bog is open to the public with a 273 metres (896 ft) boardwalk for nature walks.

=== Lower-tier Municipalities ===
Municipality	2021 Population	Sub-region	Former municipalities
Alfred and Plantagenet, Township of	9949	Prescott	Alfred Township, Alfred Village, North Plantagenet Township, Plantagenet Village.
Casselman, Village of	3960	Russell	
Champlain, Township of	8665	Prescott	Longueuil Township, L'Orignal, Vankleek Hill, West Hawkesbury Township
Clarence-Rockland, City of	26505	Russell	Rockland, Bourget
East Hawkesbury, Township of	3418	Prescott	Chute-à-Blondeau, Sainte-Anne-de-Prescott, Saint-Eugène
Hawkesbury, Town of	10194	Prescott	
Russell, Township of	19598	Russel	Embrun, Russell
The Nation, Municipality of	13350	Prescott, Russell	Limoges, St. Isidore

=== Historical townships ===
- Prescott County
  - Alfred (now part of Alfred and Plantagenet)
  - Caledonia (now part of The Nation)
  - East Hawkesbury (still exists)
  - Longueuil (now part of Champlain)
  - North Plantagenet (now part of Alfred and Plantagenet)
  - South Plantagenet (now part of The Nation)
  - West Hawkesbury (now part of Champlain)
- Russell County
  - Cambridge (now part of The Nation)
  - Clarence (still exists as part of Clarence-Rockland)
  - Cumberland (transferred to Carleton County, now part of the City of Ottawa)
  - Russell (still exists)

== Demographics ==
As a census division in the 2021 Census of Population conducted by Statistics Canada, the United Counties of Prescott and Russell had a population of 95,639 living in 38,338 of its 39,616 total private dwellings, a change of 7.1% from its 2016 population of 89,333. With a land area of 2,004.27 km^{2} (773.85 sq mi), it had a population density of 47.7/km^{2} (123.6/sq mi) in 2021.

Canada census – United Counties of Prescott and Russell community profile

	2021	2016	2011
Population	95,639 (+7.1% from 2016)	89,333 (4.6% from 2011)	85,381 (6.5% from 2006)
Land area	2,004.27 km^{2} (773.85 sq mi)	2,004.47 km^{2} (773.93 sq mi)	2,004.44 km^{2} (773.92 sq mi)
Population density	47.7/km^{2} (124/sq mi)	44.6/km^{2} (116/sq mi)	42.6/km^{2} (110/sq mi)
Median age	44.8 (M: 43.6, F: 45.6)	44.3 (M: 43.7, F: 44.9)
Private dwellings	39,616 (total) 38,338 (occupied)	36,783 (total) 35,389 (occupied)	34,400 (total)
Median household income	$95,000	$78,748

References: 2021 2016 2011

United Counties of Prescott and Russell historical census populations

Year	Pop.	±%
1921	43,436	—
1931	39,067	−10.1%
1941	38,862	−0.5%
1951	39,191	+0.8%
1956	40,669	+3.8%
1961	42,640	+4.8%

Year	Pop.	±%
1966	42,033	−1.4%
1971	44,119	+5.0%
1976	48,835	+10.7%
1981	52,777	+8.1%
1986	57,620	+9.2%
1991	67,183	+16.6%

Year	Pop.	±%
1996	74,013	+10.2%
2001	76,446	+3.3%
2006	80,184	+4.9%
2011	85,381	+6.5%
2016	89,333	+4.6%
2021	95,639	+7.1%

Source: Statistics Canada

=== Languages ===
In 2021, French was the sole mother tongue of 57.7% of its residents, and an additional 3.8% reported being natively bilingual in French and English.

Mother tongue (2021):

- English as first language: 34.0%
- French as first language: 57.7%
- English and French as first language: 3.8%
- Other as first language: 3.8%

== Services ==
Responsibilities of the county government include social services (social assistance, child care, housing), county roads, paramedic / ambulance services and land-use planning. The county also operates the Prescott-Russell Residence, a home for the aged in Hawkesbury.

=== Libraries ===
There are many public libraries located in the county. The largest is the Hawkesbury Public Library, which is located in Hawkesbury.

=== Health ===
Hawkesbury and District General Hospital, in Hawkesbury, Ontario is the only hospital in the county.

=== Police ===
The county is policed by the Ontario Provincial Police (OPP). There are two main police stations in Prescott and Russell; one in Embrun and one in Hawkesbury. In addition, there is a police station in Rockland that acts as a satellite to the one in Embrun. The OPP is also in charge of patrolling Highway 417.

== See also ==
- List of municipalities in Ontario
- List of townships in Ontario
- Prescott and Russell Recreational Trail
- St. Davids
- List of secondary schools in Ontario § Prescott and Russell United Counties
