= Vankleek Hill =

Village in Champlain, Ontario

- Unincorporated community
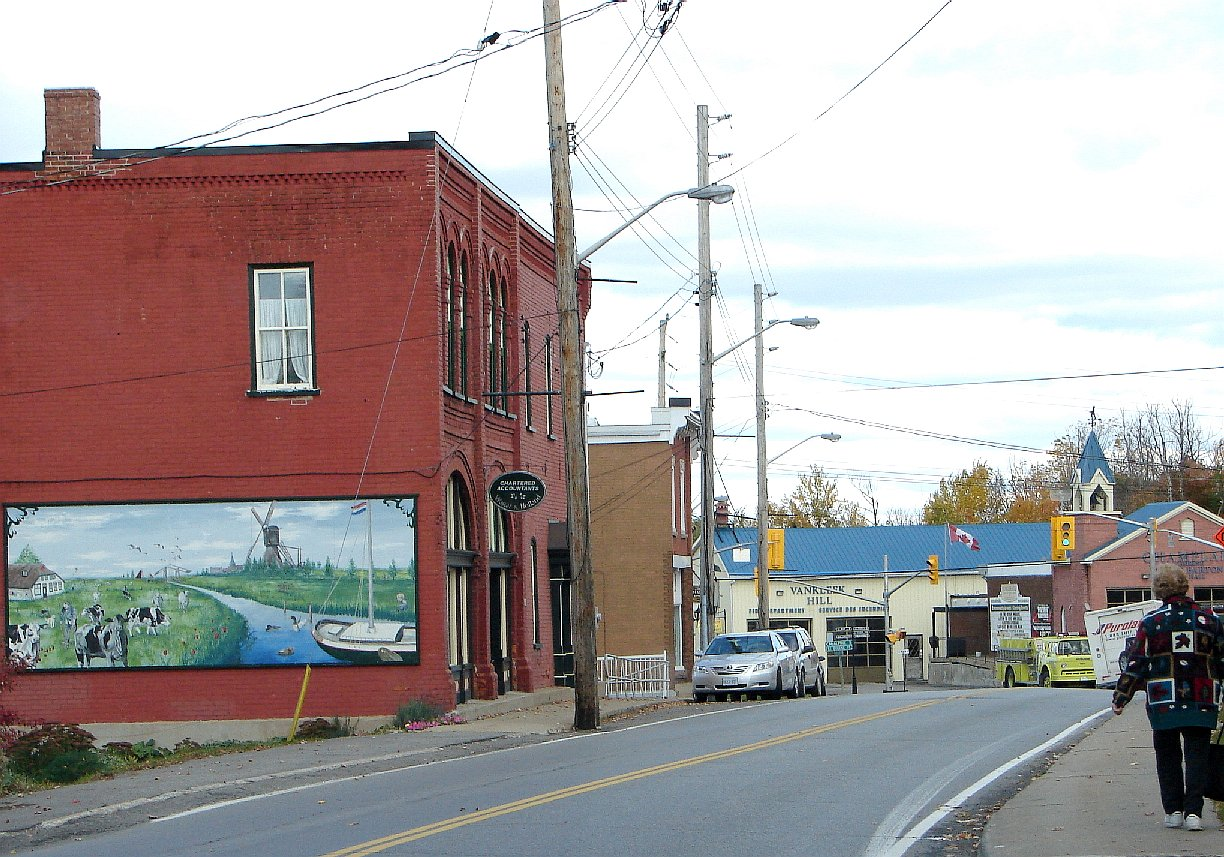

- Location within Southern Ontario
- Coordinates: 45°31′N 74°39′W
- Country: Canada
- Province: Ontario
- County: Prescott and Russell
- Municipality: Champlain
- Settled: 1797
- Incorporated: 1897
- Dissolved (amalgamated): January 1, 1998

Government
  - Fed. riding: Prescott—Russell—Cumberland
  - Prov. riding: Glengarry—Prescott—Russell

Area
  - Land: 2.23 km^{2} (0.86 sq mi)

Population (2021)
  - Total: 1,781
  - Density: 797.9/km^{2} (2,067/sq mi)
- Time zone: UTC-5 (EST)
  - Summer (DST): UTC-4 (EDT)
- Postal code: K0B 1R0
- Area codes: 613, 343

Vankleek Hill (locally abbreviated as VKH) is a rural village in Champlain Township, part of the United Counties of Prescott and Russell in Eastern Ontario. It has a population of 1,781 (2021). It is situated approximately 100 kilometres (62 mi) east of Ottawa, 100 kilometres (62 mi) west of Montreal, and 75 kilometres (47 mi) north of Cornwall, Ontario.

The town was named after Simeon Van Kleeck, a United Empire Loyalist who settled there near the end of the 18th century. The agricultural-based settlement became a thriving community in the 1890s, and has retained many Victorian-era buildings with their associated architectural features. As such, it has been referred to as the gingerbread capital of Ontario.

== History ==
Simeon Van Kleeck and his wife Cecilia Jaycox arrived in Nova Scotia from the former British Province of New York in 1783. Simeon, of Dutch descent, was a demobilized officer who had supported the British Crown during the American Revolution. His wife Cecilia had witnessed her brother's capture and execution for his British allegiance.

As a United Empire Loyalist, Simeon was to receive land in payment for his services, and he applied for his grant several times. The legend is that while he waited for a decision, he sighted high ground on a plane of flat land, south of the Ottawa River. Simeon and his son Simeon Jr. settled c. 1797 on Concession IV, Lots 7, 8, and 9, Hawkesbury Township. Today this is the location of Vankleek Hill.

Vankleek Hill's prosperity began with the Van Kleeck's family inn that served travellers going to and from the Ottawa River port of L'Orignal to southern ports on the St. Lawrence River. Soon, tradesmen and merchants were established at the four corners where today Highway 34 intersects with Main Street (County Road 10).

In 1897, Vankleek Hill was incorporated as a town, with Colonel John Shields as first mayor.

On January 1, 1998, the Town of Vankleek Hill, together with the Village of L'Orignal and the Townships of Hawkesbury West and Longueuil, was amalgamated into the new Township of Champlain. These four communities were historically linked through family and social ties, farming and commerce; and today with a common municipal government.

== Demographics ==
Historical census populations – Vankleek Hill
(Town 1897–1997, Population centre 1998–...)

Year	Pop.	±%
1901	1,674	—
1911	1,577	−5.8%
1921	1,499	−4.9%
1931	1,380	−7.9%
1941	1,435	+4.0%
1951	1,480	+3.1%
1956	1,647	+11.3%

Year	Pop.	±%
1961	1,735	+5.3%
1966	1,662	−4.2%
1971	1,691	+1.7%
1976	1,568	−7.3%
1981	1,774	+13.1%
1986	1,775	+0.1%
1991	2,062	+16.2%

Year	Pop.	±%
1996	2,030	−1.6%
2001	1,996	−1.7%
2006	1,877	−6.0%
2011	1,833	−2.3%
2016	1,742	−5.0%
2021	1,781	+2.2%

Population counts are not adjusted for boundary changes.
Source: Statistics Canada

== Tourism ==
Vankleek Hill is a popular through way for travellers exiting Highway 417 bound for Hawkesbury and beyond to Quebec on the lone river crossing between Ottawa and Vaudreuil-Dorion.

=== Gingerbread Capital of Ontario ===
Vankleek Hill was named Ontario's Gingerbread Capital in 2003. Gingerbread is the woodwork that adds architectural detail to building exteriors and interiors. The porches, windows, gables, and rooflines of over 250 homes in Vankleek Hill contain Victorian-era decorative gingerbread elements. Builders ordered millwork through catalogues. By the 1890s, the new Vankleek Hill Manufacturing Company on Mill Street created and sold decorative shingles, latticework, verge boards, columns, spindles and brackets.

The backdrop for the gingerbread is red brick, a hallmark of Vankleek Hill Victorian- and Edwardian-period buildings. The local rich clay deposits were kilned to a distinctive soft red brick by at least three local brick factories active here in the 19th and early 20th centuries.

=== Attractions ===
The town is the home of Beau's All Natural Brewing Company, an award-winning craft beer brewery that supplies pubs, restaurants, and vendors across Canada.

The Higginson Tower, originally a windmill built c. 1832, was restored in 2007 and is open for free guided tours during the summer months. Its preservation is supported by the local volunteer Higginson Tower Committee.

A year-round farmer's market is hosted each Saturday morning on the grounds of École Élémentaire Catholique Saint-Grégoire.

The village has an art gallery, The Arbor Gallery and a local heritage preservation museum. In 2025, a local English-language community theatre group was formed.

=== Events ===
Vankleek Hill hosts several annual cultural events including:

- a May Show Festival each May on Victoria Day weekend; a street festival featuring local and regional vendors and organizations.
- Trash and Treasure, a village-wide garage sale each June.
- an agricultural fair one weekend each August, the Vankleek Hill Agricultural Society Fair, featuring a demolition derby, musical attractions, and a midway.
- the Festival of Flavours takes place in September featuring culinary vendors from around the region. Notably, in 2008, a dining table stretched the length of Main Street where visitors could enjoy local foods from chefs cooking at their booths along the street.
- the Victorian Christmas Home Tour in November is a ticketed self-guided tour to a selection of seasonally-decorated homes in town, acting as a fundraiser for multiple local causes.
- a Santa Claus Parade in December.

=== Murals ===
In Vankleek Hill two trompe-l'œil murals at the corner of Home Avenue and Main Street East, and on the north side of the historic Methot building on High Street depict early Vankleek Hill storefronts, trades, community life, and the annual Vankleek Hill Agricultural Society Fair. A third mural at the corner of Main Street East and Highway 34 celebrates activities, landscapes, buildings that came to life in this agricultural community. There is a tribute to the military aid received during the 1998 ice storm.

All three murals depict true-life Vankleek Hill people, and were created by regional artists Elizabeth Skelly and Odile Têtu.

Restoration on the mural at Main Street and Highways 34 was completed in 2021. A significant portion of the mural on Home Avenue was destroyed when part of the building to which it was attached was demolished.

=== Sports and recreation ===
The local minor hockey team, the Vankleek Hill Cougars, are a member of the National Capital Junior Hockey League.

Vankleek Hill also has a soccer league, the Champlain Soccer League, which is a part of the Glengarry Soccer League. There is also a competitive hockey league called the Eastern Prescott-Russell Minor Hockey Association, a curling club with two sheets, as well as a local sports club offering a variety of youth and adult recreational sports.

Each March, hockey players from Ontario, Quebec and the northeastern United States gather in Vankleek Hill for a 4-on-4 hockey tournament known as the Pond Rocket Cup. Teams are made up of former junior, college and professional players, but also feature local players. The PRC as it is known, has become the social event of the winter in the area.

The community also has cross-country skiing trails operated by local club Ski-Vent-Clic.

Vankleek Hill is linked to larger networks of off-highway vehicle trails maintained by the ATV Club of Eastern Ontario and the Eastern Ontario Snowmobile Club.

== Education ==
The Vankleek Hill area has several educational facilities. At the elementary level, there are three different schools which children are able to attend:

- Pleasant Corners Public School (PCPS), an English language school and part of the Upper Canada District School Board and has classes from Kindergarten to Grade 8 offering Core (basic) and Immersion French language instruction.
- St. Jude Catholic School, a half-English, half-French school that is part of the Catholic District School Board of Eastern Ontario and runs from Kindergarten to Grade 8 offering Core and Immersion French instruction.
- St. Gregoire (École Élémentaire Catholique Saint-Grégoire), a fully French-language Kindergarten to Grade 6 Catholic school, part of the Conseil scolaire de district catholique de l'Est ontarien.

The town's secondary school, Vankleek Hill Collegiate Institute (VCI), is the only English speaking High School in the region and, like PCPS, is also part of the Upper Canada District School Board.

Vankleek Hill has three licensed child-care centres: two English-language centres based out of St. Jude Catholic School and Pleasant Corners Public School, as well as one French-language centre at École Élémentaire Catholique Saint-Gregoire.

There are no active post-secondary educational institutions or campuses in Vankleek Hill.

== Political representation ==
Vankleek Hill is one of four wards in Champlain Township, a lower-tier municipality within the United Counties of Prescott and Russell. Champlain Township was created on January 1, 1998, as a result of the amalgamation of these former municipalities:

- The Town of Vankleek Hill,
- The Village of L'Original,
- The Township of West Hawkesbury and
- The Township of Longueuil

Vankleek Hill is identified as Ward 1 in Champlain Township and is represented by two councillors.

Vankleek Hill is part of the Glengarry—Prescott—Russell provincial electoral district. Its federal riding is Prescott—Russell—Cumberland, as of the 2023 redistricting.

Its federal Member of Parliament is Liberal Giovanna Mingarelli. At the provincial level, the riding is represented by Progressive Conservative Member of Provincial Parliament Stéphane Sarrazin (politician).

== Local media ==
- Vankleek FM - 88.7 (defunct as of 2025)
- The Review newspaper.

== Notable people ==
- Andrew Allen, goaltender and coach
- Connie Brown, NHL hockey player
- Don Cousens, politician; Ontario MPP and mayor of Markham, Ontario
- James B. Harkin, first commissioner of Dominion Parks Branch (birthplace)
- Mark Mahon, professional hockey player, coach and executive
- Marc Strange, actor, mystery-novel writer, and creator of The Beachcombers television series

== See also ==
- List of unincorporated communities in Ontario
