= Clarence-Rockland =

City in Ontario, Canada

- City (lower-tier)
- City of Clarence-Rockland; Cité de Clarence-Rockland
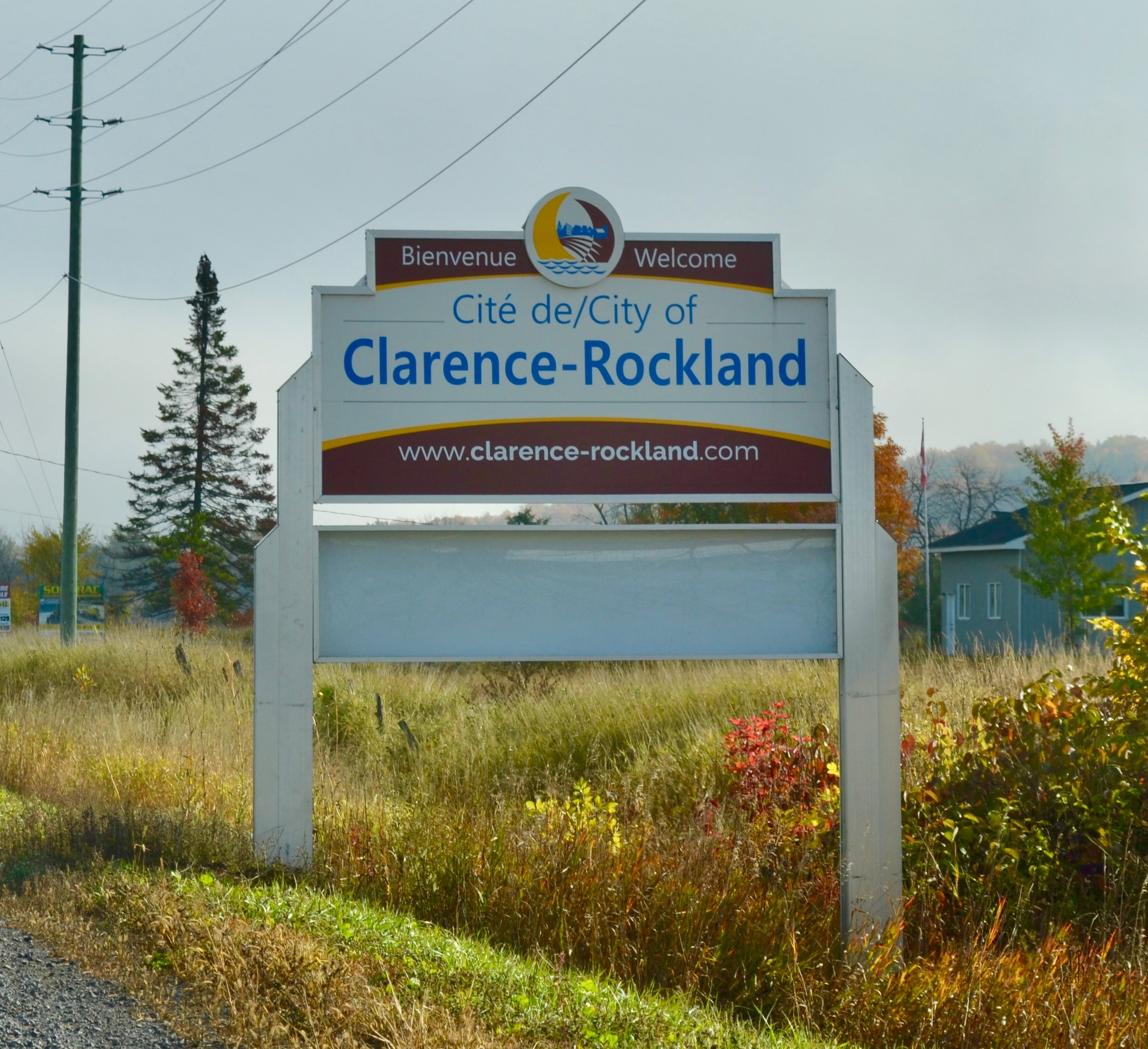

- Location within United Counties of Prescott and Russell Location within Southern Ontario
- Coordinates: 45°29′17″N 75°12′54″W
- Country: Canada
- Province: Ontario
- County: Prescott and Russell
- Settled: 1840s
- Incorporation: January 1998

Government
  - Type: City
  - Mayor: Mario Zanth
  - Federal riding: Prescott—Russell—Cumberland
  - Prov. riding: Glengarry—Prescott—Russell

Area
  - Land: 297.47 km^{2} (114.85 sq mi)

Population (2021)
  - Total: 26,505
  - Density: 89.1/km^{2} (231/sq mi)
- Time zone: UTC−05:00 (EST)
  - Summer (DST): UTC−04:00 (EDT)
- Area code: 613 / 343
- Website: www.clarence-rockland.com

Clarence-Rockland is a city in Eastern Ontario, Canada, in the United Counties of Prescott and Russell on the Ottawa River. Clarence-Rockland, located immediately to the east of Ottawa, was formed on January 1, 1998, through the amalgamation of the Town of Rockland with Clarence Township.

The geographic Township of Clarence was established in 1798 and named after Prince William Henry, Duke of Clarence. Communities were established in the township since the early 1840s. In July 1853, the Township Municipality of Clarence was created when it separated from the United Township of Russell, Cambridge and Clarence. Rockland was incorporated as a town in 1908.

== Communities ==
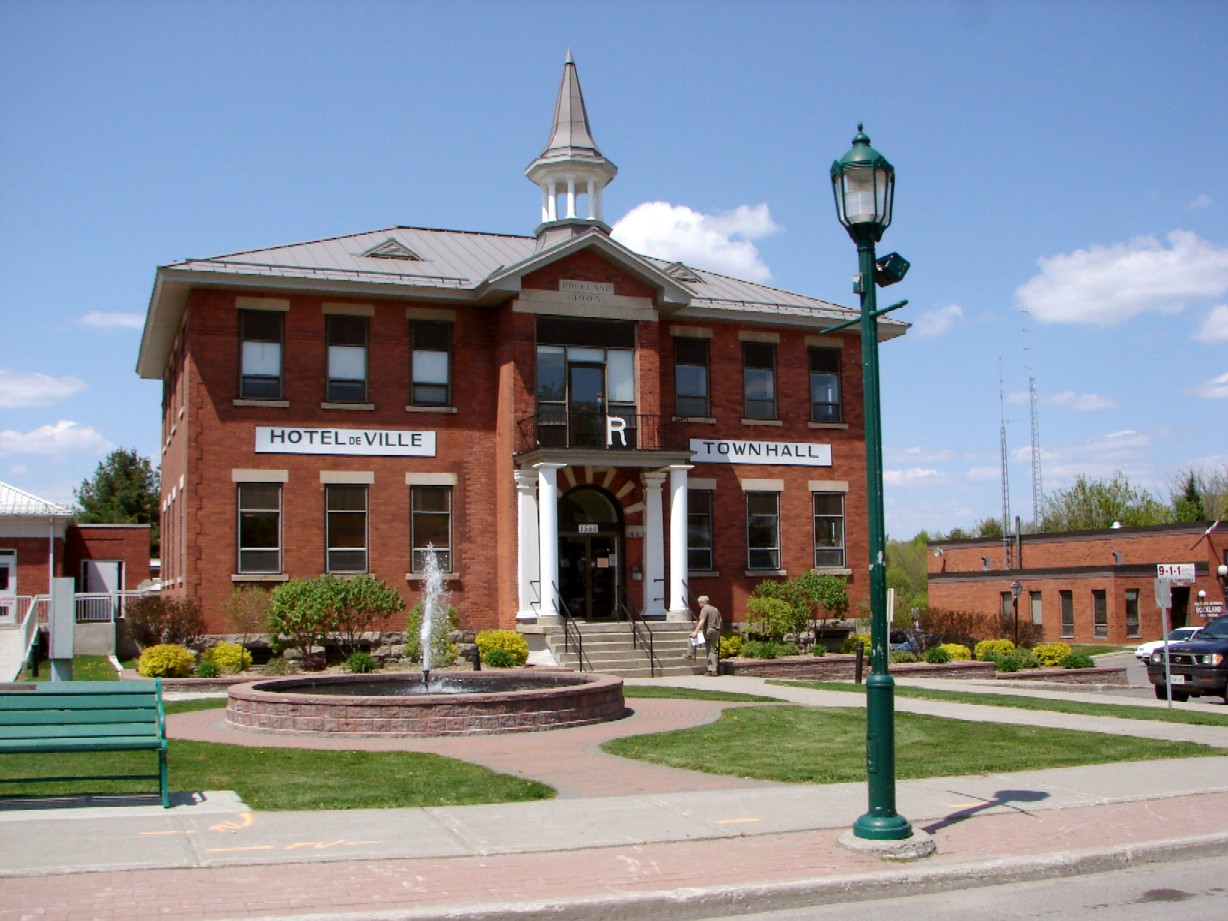
Town hall in Rockland

The city includes the communities of Bourget, Cheney, Clarence, Clarence Creek, Hammond, Rockland, and Saint-Pascal-Baylon. The city administrative offices are located in Rockland, which is the largest community in the region.

== Demographics ==
In the 2021 Census of Population conducted by Statistics Canada, Clarence-Rockland had a population of 26,505 living in 10,095 of its 10,316 total private dwellings, a change of 8.1% from its 2016 population of 24,512. With a land area of 297.47 km^{2} (114.85 sq mi), it had a population density of 89.1/km^{2} (230.8/sq mi) in 2021.

Canada census – Clarence-Rockland community profile

	2021	2016	2011
Population	26,505 (+8.1% from 2016)	24,512 (5.7% from 2011)	23,185 (11.5% from 2006)
Land area	297.47 km^{2} (114.85 sq mi)	297.71 km^{2} (114.95 sq mi)	297.86 km^{2} (115.00 sq mi)
Population density	89.1/km^{2} (231/sq mi)	82.3/km^{2} (213/sq mi)	77.8/km^{2} (202/sq mi)
Median age	43.2 (M: 42.4, F: 44.0)	42.2 (M: 41.8, F: 42.7)	40.2 (M: 39.9, F: 40.5)
Private dwellings	10,316 (total) 10,095 (occupied)	9,537 (total)	8796 (total)
Median household income	$106,000	$88,823	$82,898

References: 2021 2016 2011

Historical census populations – Clarence-Rockland
Year	Pop.	±%
2001	19,612	—
2006	20,790	+6.0%
2011	23,185	+11.5%
2016	24,512	+5.7%
2021	26,505	+8.1%
Source: Statistics Canada

Historical census populations – Clarence Township

Year	Pop.	±%
1871	2,666	—
1881	4,411	+65.5%
1891	4,779	+8.3%
1901	6,085	+27.3%
1911	5,463	−10.2%
1921	5,307	−2.9%

Year	Pop.	±%
1931	4,904	−7.6%
1941	4,630	−5.6%
1951	4,497	−2.9%
1956	4,605	+2.4%
1961	4,727	+2.6%
1966	4,057	−14.2%

Year	Pop.	±%
1971	4,589	+13.1%
1976	5,782	+26.0%
1981	6,518	+12.7%
1986	7,516	+15.3%
1991	8,982	+19.5%
1996	10,563	+17.6%

Population counts are not adjusted for boundary changes (Rockland Town annexed part of Clarence in 1963).
Source: Statistics Canada

Historical census populations – Rockland Town

Year	Pop.	±%
1891	1,465	—
1901	1,998	+36.4%
1911	3,397	+70.0%
1921	3,496	+2.9%
1931	2,118	−39.4%
1941	2,040	−3.7%

Year	Pop.	±%
1951	2,348	+15.1%
1956	2,757	+17.4%
1961	3,037	+10.2%
1966	3,513	+15.7%
1971	3,649	+3.9%
1976	3,930	+7.7%

Year	Pop.	±%
1981	3,961	+0.8%
1986	4,894	+23.6%
1991	6,771	+38.4%
1996	8,070	+19.2%

Population counts are not adjusted for boundary changes (Rockland Town annexed part of Clarence in 1963).
Source: Statistics Canada

=== Languages ===
Mother tongue (2021):

- French as first language: 57.0 %
- English as first language: 34.0 %
- English and French as first language: 4.1 %
- Other as first language: 4.2 %

== Public transportation ==
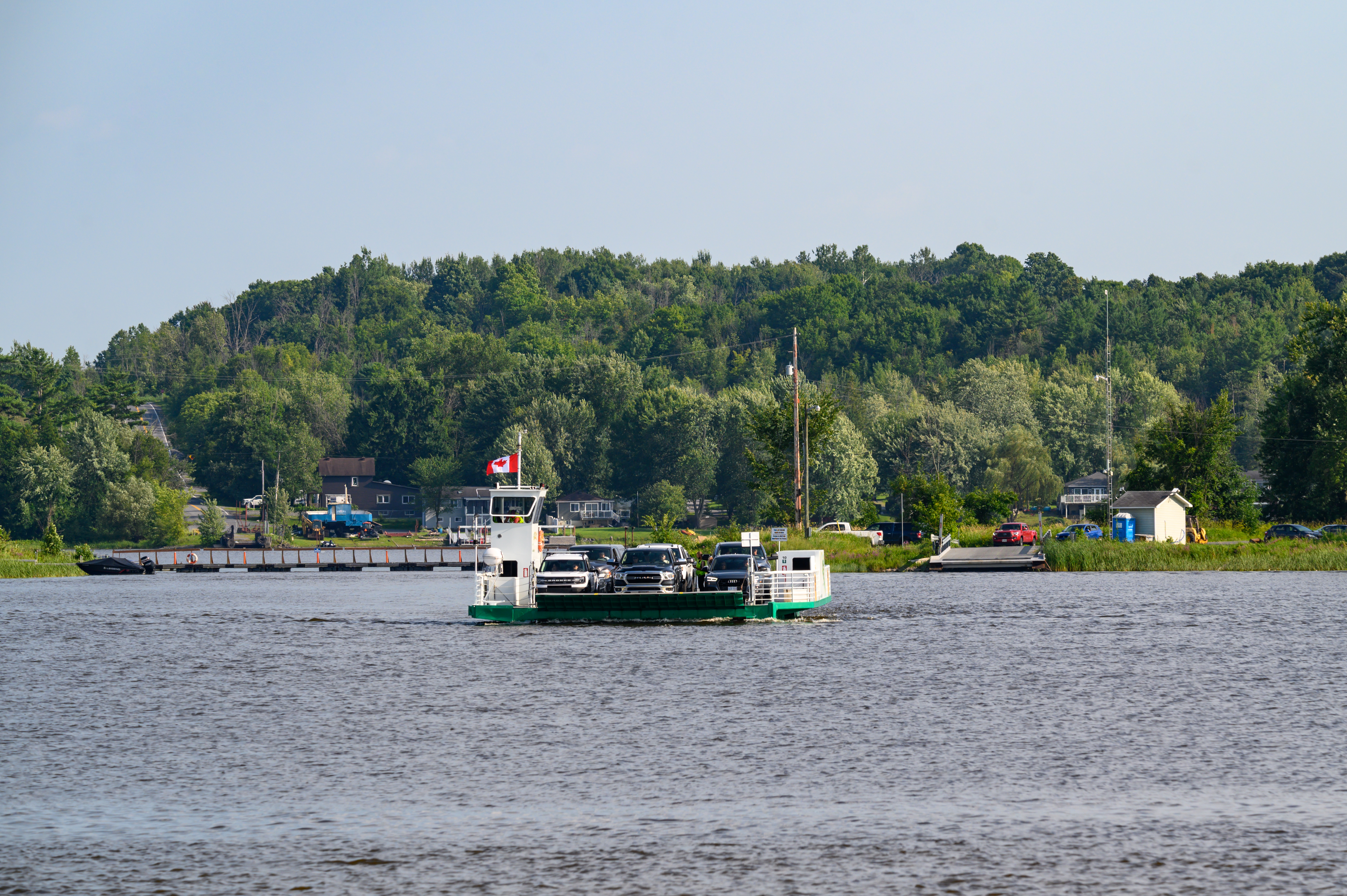
Thurso-Clarence/Rockland electric cable ferry, Ecolos

Clarence-Rockland Transpo provided a public transportation service to residents of the city; part of the Rural Partners Transit Service. This service consisted of bus routes 530 and 535, ran by Leduc Bus Lines. These routes connected many of the communities within Clarence-Rockland and Ottawa. Both routes have been indefinitely suspended since the COVID-19 pandemic due to safety concerns and low demand.

== Notable people ==
- William Cameron Edwards

== See also ==
- List of townships in Ontario
- List of francophone communities in Ontario
