= Area codes 613, 343, and 753 =

Area codes for Ottawa and Eastern Ontario

Coordinates: 44.990°N 75.752°W

Area codes 613, 343, and 753 are telephone area codes in the North American Numbering Plan (NANP) for Ottawa and surrounding Eastern Ontario, Canada. Area code 613 is one of the 86 original North American area codes assigned in October 1947. Area codes 343 and 753 were assigned to the numbering plan area in an overlay activated in 2010 and 2022, respectively.

== History ==
Evolution of area codes in Ontario and southwestern Quebec

Area code 613 was originally assigned to a numbering plan area that comprised the vast northern part of Ontario, north of Southern Ontario with the Golden Horseshoe. Southern Ontario was assigned the area code 416. Numbering plan area 613 was split twice. In 1953, the southwestern portion of 613 was combined with the western part of 416 to become numbering plan area 519. In 1957, 613 was reduced to the Ottawa area and surrounding eastern Ontario, while the large remaining area was combined with the northern part of 519 to form numbering plan area 705 Since that time and the implementation of Direct Distance Dialing (DDD) in Canada, 613 comprises only eastern Ontario, an area extending from Brighton and Deep River eastward to Saint Regis, Quebec.

Ottawa falls on the boundary between 613 and Quebec's area code 819. Ottawa shares a local calling area with its neighbouring suburb Gatineau (the former city of Hull, Quebec). As a result, for 46 years, calls could be dialled between Ottawa and Hull with only seven digits.

While the geographic area served by 613, has fewer than two million people, the bulk of that population lives in the City of Ottawa. To preserve seven-digit dialling between Ottawa and Hull, a system of central office code protection was implemented so that the same seven-digit local number could not be assigned on both sides of the National Capital Region. Technically, it was only necessary that no two prefixes within the same local calling area be duplicates, but the code protection, as implemented, reserved the numbers across both area codes. This meant that if an 819-number was dialled in Hull, the corresponding 613-number could not be used anywhere in eastern Ontario, even in areas a safe distance from the National Capital Region such as Brighton. Similarly, if a 613-number was assigned in Ottawa–Carleton, the corresponding 819-number could not be used anywhere in western Quebec. Federal government offices in Hull duplicated their entire allocation of multiple exchanges worth of numbers available in 613 as part of a "dual dialability" scheme.

By the turn of the century, both 613 and 819 were close to exhaustion. Every competitive local exchange carrier received blocks of 10,000 numbers, corresponding to a single prefix, in every rate centre in which it planned to offer local service, no matter how small. Larger municipalities have multiple rate centres and multiple competing carriers in each. For instance, even though Ottawa has been a single municipality since merging with the Regional Municipality of Ottawa–Carleton in 2001, it still has 11 rate centres (plus portions of other rate centres primarily located beyond the city limits) – most with very similar local calling areas – which have never been amalgamated. The "Ottawa–Hull" exchange only covers the area that was the city of Ottawa prior to the 2001 amalgamation, plus the former suburbs of Nepean (central part) and Vanier and small sections of other urban communities.

The proliferation of cell phones and pagers, particularly in the larger cities in the 613 area, put a constraint on the numbering plan. The allocation problem was even more severe on the Quebec side; by 2006, the only remaining unassigned exchange prefixes in the entire 819 region were numbers which could not be assigned to what had been Hull without breaking seven-digit dialling to Ottawa.

Ten-digit dialling in 613 and 819 became mandatory on October 21, 2006. Intraprovincial calls from rate centres with no local calling beyond a small fragment of their own area code were returning intercept messages if dialled as seven digits. Exchange protection in the National Capital Region was ended, except for the "dual dialability" scheme for government numbers on both sides of the river.

Within two years, it became apparent that a new area code was necessary due to the continued number allocation problem – an issue exacerbated by the proliferation of cell phones and pagers. A geographic split was quickly ruled out. Local telephone companies did not want the expense and burden of changing existing customers' numbers, which would have required en masse reprogramming of cell phones. As a result, overlay area codes were proposed for both 613 and 819. By this time, overlays had become the preferred method of relief in Canada, as they are an easy workaround for the number allocation problems that brought the numbering pools on both sides of the Ottawa River under strain.

Area code 343, an overlay proposed in 2007, and approved by the Canadian Radio-television and Telecommunications Commission on September 10, 2008, was activated for the region on May 17, 2010, several years earlier than originally anticipated.

On 10 November 2021, the Canadian Numbering Administrator approved an additional overlay code for the numbering plan area 613/343. Area code 753 was assigned for activation on March 26, 2022.

Area code 871 has been reserved as the fourth area code for the region since May 2025.

== Carriers ==
The main incumbent local exchange carrier in area code 613 is Bell Canada, but there are some five independent companies serving rural exchanges: the Lansdowne Rural Telephone Company, serving Lansdowne; the North Frontenac Telephone Company, serving Sharbot Lake and Parham; the North Renfrew Telephone Company, serving Beachburg, Westmeath, and the area outside Pembroke; the Roxborough Telephone Company, serving Moose Creek; and the Westport Telephone Company, serving Westport.

Also served by area code 613 and Bell Canada is Saint-Régis, Quebec. The exchange covers the Mohawk nation territory of Akwesasne, which straddles the Ontario–Québec–New York border. Calls from Saint-Régis to Fort Covington, New York, are local although they cross an international border.

In the west, Rapides-des-Joachims, Quebec, shares an exchange with the adjacent Rolphton, Ontario.

== Communities and central office codes ==
- Adolphustown (Greater Napanee) – (613): 373
- Addington Highlands (township): see Denbigh, Northbrook
- Alexandria (North Glengarry) – (343): 432 474, (613): 525, 642
- For the municipality "Alfred and Plantagenet", see Alfred and Plantagenet
- Alfred (Alfred and Plantagenet) – (343): 371, 691, 789, (613): 605, 679, 708
- Almonte – (343): 372, 760, (613): 256, 461
- Arden (Central Frontenac) – (343): 268, (613): 335
- Arnprior – (343): 373, 761, (613): 622, 623, 626
- Athens – (613): 924, 927
- Avonmore (North Stormont) – (343): 433, (613): 346
- Bancroft – (343): 269, 357, 401, 476, 943, (613): 202, 303, 318, 332, 334, 412, 442, 553, 630
- Barry's Bay – (343): 241, (613): 756
- Bath (Loyalist Township) – (613): 351, 352, 881
- Beachburg (Whitewater Region) – (613): 582
- For the municipality of Belleville, see Belleville and Thurlow (former township now in the city)
- Belleville – (343): 261, 263, 270, 355, 362, 367, 600, 645, 889, (613): 210, 242, 243, 391, 403, 438, 480, 554, 661, 689, 707, 743, 771, 779, 813, 827, 847, 848, 849, 885, 902, 919, 920, 921, 922, 961, 962, 966, 967, 968, 969, 970
- Bloomfield (Prince Edward County) – (613): 393
- Bourget – (343): 374, 762, (613): 426, 487, 603
- Brighton – (343): 271, (613): 439, 475, 481, 814
- Brockville – (343): 225, 264, 300, 320, 327, 480, (613): 213, 246, 340, 341, 342, 345, 349, 423, 498, 499, 556, 640, 704, 802, 803, 865
- Calabogie (Greater Madawaska) – (613): 752
- Cardiff (Highlands East) – (613): 338
- Cardinal (Edwardsburgh/Cardinal) – (613): 655, 657, 671
- Carleton Place – (343): 213, 285, 375, 503, 763, (613): 250, 251, 253, 257, 418, 434, 451, 452, 456, 492, 508, 621, 964
- Carp – (343): 376, 764, (613): 470, 839
- Casselman – (343): 377, 765, (613): 427, 764
- Central Frontenac (township): see Arden, Parham
- Chalk River – (613): 589
- Chesterville (North Dundas) – (343): 378, 766, (613): 436, 448
- For the city "Clarence-Rockland", see Clarence Creek and Rockland
- Clarence Creek (Clarence-Rockland) – (343): 379, 767, (613): 420, 488
- Cobden – (613): 646, 647
- Coe Hill (Wollaston) – (613): 337
- Constance Bay (Ottawa) – (343): 380, 768, (613): 578, 832
- Cornwall – (343): 288, 301, 330, 356, 370, 431, 444, 475, 585, 885, (613): 209, 330, 360, 361, 362, 363, 505, 551, 571, 577, 662, 703, 861, 870, 930, 931, 932, 933, 935, 936, 937, 938
- Crysler (North Stormont) – (343): 381, (613): 987
- Cumberland – (343): 382, 769, (613): 467, 517, 573, 833, 892
- Deep River – (613): 584
- Delta – (613): 616, 928
- Denbigh (Addington Highlands) – (613): 333
- Deseronto – (343): 265, (613): 309, 396
- Douglas (Admaston/Bromley) – (613): 649
- East Hawkesbury (township): see St. Eugene
- Edwardsburgh/Cardinal (township): see Cardinal, Spencerville
- Eganville – (613): 628
- Elgin (Rideau Lakes) – (613): 359
- Embrun – (343): 383, 770, (613): 370, 443, 557
- Enterprise (Stone Mills) – (613): 358
- Finch (North Stormont) – (343): 434, (613): 984
- Foymount – (613): 754
- Frankford (Quinte West) – (613): 398, 486
- For the municipality of Frontenac Islands, see Wolfe Island, Kingston
- Gananoque – (343): 479, (613): 381, 382, 463, 718, 815
- Gilmour (Tudor and Cashel) – (613): 474
- Glen Robertson (North Glengarry) – (343): 435, (613): 874
- Gloucester (Ottawa) – (343): 384, 771, (613): 425, 455, 502, 822
- Golden Lake (North Algona Wilberforce) – (613): 625
- For Greater Madawaska (township), see Calabogie
- For the municipality "Greater Napanee", see Adolphustown, Napanee, Selby
- Harrowsmith – (613): 372
- Hawkesbury – (343): 500, (613): 306, 307, 632, 636
- Ingleside (South Stormont) – (343): 436, (613): 522, 537
- Inverary (South Frontenac) – (613): 353, 653
- Iroquois (South Dundas) – (343): 437, (613): 652, 669
- Jockvale (Ottawa) – (343): 212, 303, 385, 772, (613): 440, 459, 512, 823, 825, 843
- Kanata–Stittsville (Ottawa) – (343): 359 386 667 690, 773, (613): 254, 270, 271, 280, 287, 383, 435, 457, 509, 519, 576, 591, 592, 595, 599, 609, 663, 801, 831, 836, 886, 895, 963, 974, 977
- Kemptville (North Grenville) – (343): 387, 774, (613): 215, 258, 713
- Killaloe – (613): 757
- Kingston – (343): 266, 290, 302, 333, 344, 358, 363, 364, 422, 477, 884, 989, (613): 214, 217, 305, 328, 329, 331, 344, 384, 389, 417, 449, 453, 483, 484, 507, 514, 530, 531, 532, 533, 536, 539, 540, 541, 542, 544, 545, 546, 547, 548, 549, 561, 572, 583, 634, 650, 766, 767, 770, 776, 777, 817, 840, 856, 876, 877, 887, 888, 893, 900, 929, 985
- L'Orignal (Champlain Township) – (343): 438, (613): 675
- Lanark Highlands (township), see Lanark, McDonalds Corners
- Lanark – (613): 259
- Lancaster (South Glengarry) – (343): 439, (613): 313, 347
- Lansdowne (Leeds and the Thousand Islands) – (613): 659
- Leeds and the Thousand Islands (township): see Lansdowne, Mallorytown, Seeleys Bay
- Long Sault (South Stormont) – (343): 440, (613): 534, 550
- Loyalist Township, see Bath and Odessa
- Maberly (Tay Valley) – (613): 268
- Madoc – (343): 472, (613): 473, 666
- Maitland – (613): 320, 348, 664
- Mallorytown – (613): 923, 973
- Manotick (Ottawa) – (343): 214, 388, 775, (613): 491, 692, 908
- Marmora – (613): 472, 644
- Martintown (South Glengarry) – (343): 441, (613): 528
- Maxville (North Glengarry) – (343): 442, (613): 527
- Maynooth (Hastings Highlands) – (613): 338
- McDonalds Corners (Lanark Highlands) – (613): 278
- Merrickville (Merrickville-Wolford) – (343) 340 389, (613): 269
- Metcalfe (Ottawa) – (343) 390, 776, (613): 574, 821
- Mississippi Mills (township): see Pakenham
- Moose Creek (North Stormont) – (613): 538
- Morrisburg – (343): 443, (613): 543, 643
- Napanee (Greater Napanee) – (343): 267, 478, (613): 308, 354, 409, 462
- Navan (Ottawa) – (343) 391, 778, (613): 429, 835
- Newburgh (Stone Mills) – (613): 378
- North Algona Wilberforce: see Golden Lake
- North Augusta – (613): 665, 926
- North Dundas (township): see Chesterville, South Mountain and Winchester
- North Glengarry (township): see Alexandria, Glen Robertson, Maxville
- North Gower (Ottawa) – (343): 392, 779, (613): 489, 493
- North Stormont (township): see Avonmore, Crysler, Finch, Moose Creek
- Northbrook (Addington Highlands) – (343): 272, 336
- Odessa (Loyalist Township) – (613): 386, 896
- Orleans (Ottawa) – (343): 221, 393, 780, (613): 424, 458, 510, 590, 824, 830, 834, 837, 841, 845
- Osgoode (Ottawa) – (343): 394, 467, 781, 955 (613): 465, 469, 516, 826, (753): 200
- In Ontario, the Ottawa–Hull exchange covers the pre-2001 city of Ottawa, from Nepean to Vanier only. For the municipality of Ottawa, see Ottawa–Hull, Constance Bay, Gloucester, Jockvale, Kanata, Manotick, Metcalfe, Navan, North Gower, Orléans, Osgoode.
- Ottawa–Hull city centre – (343): 200, 201, 203, 244, 262, 291, 292, 360, 488, 540, 541, 542, 666, 688, 689, 700, 777, 882, 883, 887, 888, 925, 988, 998, 999, (613): 203, 204, 212, 216, 218, 219, 220, 221, 222, 223, 224, 225, 226, 227, 228, 229, 230, 231, 232, 233, 234, 235, 236, 237, 238, 239, 240, 241, 244, 245, 247, 248, 249, 252, 255, 260, 261, 262, 263, 265, 266, 274, 276, 277, 282, 286, 288, 290, 291, 292, 293, 294, 295, 296, 297, 298, 299, 301, 302, 304, 314, 315, 316, 317, 319, 321, 322, 323, 324, 325, 327, 350, 355, 356, 357, 364, 366, 368, 369, 371, 380, 400, 402, 404, 406, 407, 408, 410, 413, 415, 416, 421, 422, 437, 447, 454, 462. 482, 500, 501, 513, 514, 515, 518, 520, 521, 523, 526, 552, 558, 560, 562, 563, 564, 565, 566, 567, 569, 580, 581, 593, 594, 596, 597, 598, 600, 601, 604, 606, 607, 608, 612, 614, 615, 617, 618, 619, 620, 627, 656, 660, 667, 668, 670, 680, 683, 686, 688, 690, 691, 693, 694, 695, 696, 697, 698, 699, 700, 701, 702, 709, 710, 712, 714, 715, 716, 719, 720, 721, 722, 723, 724, 725, 726, 727, 728, 729, 730, 731, 733, 734, 736, 737, 738, 739, 740, 741, 742, 744, 745, 746, 747, 748, 749, 750, 751, 755, 759, 760, 761, 762, 763, 765, 768, 769, 773, 778, 780, 781, 782, 783, 784, 785, 786, 787, 788, 789, 790, 791, 792, 793, 794, 795, 796, 797, 798, 799, 800, 804, 805, 806, 807, 808, 809, 816, 818, 820, 828, 829, 842, 844, 850, 851, 852, 853, 854, 857, 858, 859, 860, 862, 863, 864, 866, 867, 868, 869, 875, 878, 880, 882, 883, 884, 889, 890, 891, 894, 897, 898, 899, 901, 903, 904, 907, 909, 910, 912, 913, 914, 915, 916, 917, 934, 940, 941, 943, 944, 945, 946, 947, 948, 949, 951, 952, 953, 954, 956, 957, 960, 971, 978, 979, 981, 983, 986, 990, 991, 992, 993, 994, 995, 996, 997, 998, 999, 934p, 939p, 953p, 956p, 994p, 997p
- Pakenham (Mississippi Mills) – (343): 395, (613): 624
- Palmer Rapids (Brudenell, Lyndoch and Raglan) – (613): 758
- Parham (Central Frontenac) – (613): 375
- Pembroke independent – (613): 638
- Pembroke – (343): 369, 430, 544, (613): 281, 312, 401, 504, 559, 585, 602, 629, 631, 633, 635, 639, 717, 732, 735, 775
- Perth – (343): 341, 400, 402, (613): 200, 201, 264, 267, 300, 326, 390, 464, 466, 714, 772, 812
- Petawawa – (613): 506, 588, 685, 687
- Picton (Prince Edward County) – (343): 222, (613): 471, 476, 503, 645, 654, 846, 906
- Plantagenet (Alfred and Plantagenet) – (343): 396, 783, (613): 405, 673
- Plevna (North Frontenac) – (343): 273, (613): 479
- Portland (Rideau Lakes) – (613): 272, 972
- Prescott – (613): 529, 918, 925, 975
- For the municipality of Quinte West, see Frankford, Trenton and Wooler
- Renfrew – (343): 361, (613): 431, 432, 433, 570
- For the municipality of Prince Edward County, see Picton, Bloomfield, Wellington
- Richmond – (343): 200, 397, 784, (613): 444, 838
- Rideau Lakes (township): see Elgin, Portland
- Rockland (Clarence-Rockland) – (343): 200, 398, 785, (613): 419, 446
- Rolphton (Laurentian Hills) – (613): 586
- Russell – (343): 399, 786, (613): 445, 496
- Seeleys Bay (Leeds and the Thousand Islands) – (613): 387
- Selby (Greater Napanee) – (613): 388
- Sharbot Lake – (613): 279
- Smiths Falls – (343): 800, 881, (613): 205, 206, 207, 283, 284, 285, 414, 418, 430, 485, 682, 706, 855, 980, 982, 988
- South Dundas (township): see Iroquois, Morrisburg, Williamsburg
- South Frontenac (township): see Harrowsmith, Inverary, Sydenham, Verona
- South Glengarry (township): see Lancaster, Martintown
- South Mountain (North Dundas) – (343): 345, (613): 989
- South Stormont (township): see Ingleside, Long Sault
- Spencerville (Edwardsburgh/Cardinal) – (613): 648, 658
- Saint Regis (Akwesasane) – (343): 447, (613): 575
- St. Eugene (East Hawkesbury) – (343): 445, (613): 674
- St. Isidore – (343): 446, (613): 524
- Stirling (Stirling–Rawdon) – (613): 395, 490
- Stone Mills (township): see Enterprise, Newburgh, Yarker
- Sydenham (South Frontenac) – (613): 376
- Tamworth – (613): 379
- Thurlow (Belleville) – (613): 477, 494
- Toledo (Elizabethtown-Kitley) – (613): 275
- Trenton (Quinte West) – (613): 208, 392, 394, 495, 651, 681, 955, 965
- Tweed – (613): 478
- Vankleek Hill – (343): 304, 448, 473 886, (613): 676, 677, 678, 684, 872
- Verona (South Frontenac) – (613): 374
- Wellington (Prince Edward County) – (613): 399
- Westmeath (Whitewater Region) – (613): 587
- Westport – (613): 273
- Whitewater Region: see Beachburg, Westmeath
- Whitney (South Algonquin) – (613): 637
- Williamsburg (South Dundas) – (343): 449, (613): 535, 641
- Winchester (North Dundas) – (343) 346, 787, (613): 441, 774
- Wolfe Island (Frontenac Islands) – (613): 385
- Wollaston: see Coe Hill
- Wooler (Quinte West) – (613): 397, 497
- Yarker (Stone Mills) – (613): 377
- shared-cost service – (613): 310

p = Protected against assignment in both 819 and 613 – Government of Canada offices

== See also ==
- List of Ontario area codes
- List of North American Numbering Plan area codes

Ontario area codes: 416/437/647/942, 519/226/548/382, 613/343/753, 705/249/683, 807, 905/289/365/742
	North: 468/819/873	
West: 289/365/906, 249/705	343/613/753	East: 450/579
	South: 315/680, 518/838	
Quebec area codes: 367/418/581, 354/450/579, 263/438/514, 468/819/873
New York area codes: 212/332/646, 315/680, 363/516, 518/838, 585, 607, 631/934, 624/716, 347/718/929, 329/845, 914, 917
