= Perley Bridge =

Former bridge across the Ottawa River in Canada

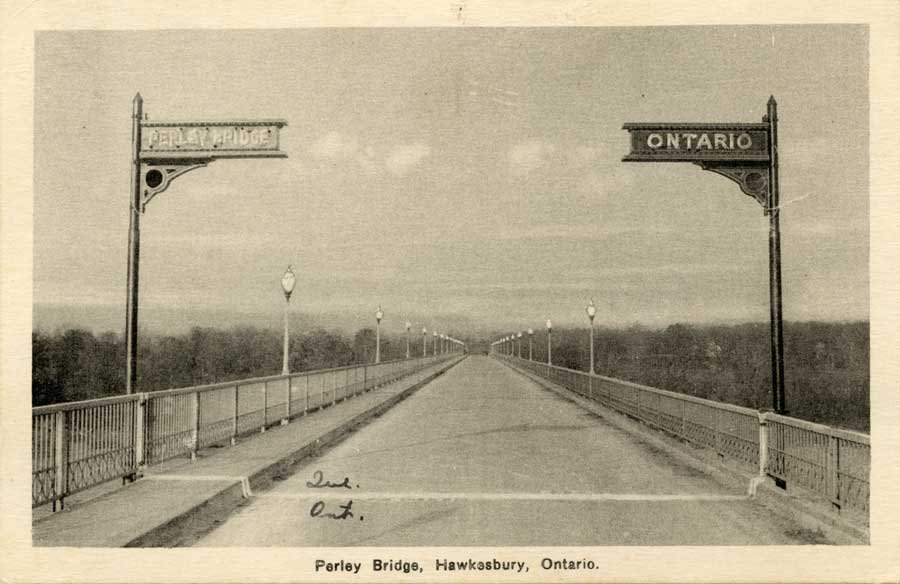
- Postcard image of the Perley Bridge
- Coordinates: 45.3706°N 74.3552°W
- Carries: road vehicles, pedestrians, bicycles
- Crosses: Ottawa River
- Locale: Ontario–Quebec border
- Named for: George Perley
- Preceded by: Macdonald-Cartier Bridge
- Followed by: Lake of Two Mountains

Characteristics
- Design: truss
- Material: Concrete & steel
- Pier construction: concrete
- Total length: 2,284 feet (696 m)
- Width: 24 feet (7.3 m) (roadway)
- Traversable?: yes

History
- Constructed by: Canadian Bridge Company
- Construction end: 1931
- Rebuilt: 1961
- Closed: 1998
- Replaced by: Long-Sault Bridge

Statistics
- Daily traffic: 11,000–12,000 (1970s)

Location
- Interactive map of Perley Bridge

The Perley Bridge was a bridge connecting Hawkesbury, Ontario and Grenville, Quebec. It crossed the Ottawa River via Chenail Island. It was named for George Perley, Canadian Member of Parliament representing the Argenteuil district in southern Quebec. He first advocated for a crossing at Hawkesbury in 1909. The bridge was known as the Hawkesbury–Grenville Bridge, or less frequently the Grenville–Hawkesbury Bridge prior to its completion in 1931 when the name Perley was applied. It was replaced by the Long-Sault Bridge in 1998.

== Early history ==
The towns began to request the bridge in 1908, with initial survey work done in 1910. The bridge was designed by 1914, however no agreement was reached between the national government and the two provinces on how the cost would be shared. The project was put aside due to World War I and not revived until 1923. By then, the design needed to be revised to meet contemporary construction standards. Redesign work was completed in 1924, but construction would wait a further six years. Bids for the fabrication of the bridge superstructure were not solicited until July 1930. It was completed in 1931, at a cost of approximately $500,000, opening to traffic on October 21. The steel was fabricated by the Canadian Bridge Company of Walkerville, Ontario and the general contractor was Farley & Grant. The bridge was 2,284 feet (696 m) in length (measured between abutments) and included 34 different spans, 27 of which were trestle spans over the shallower area on either end. The others were five longer deck truss spans set on piers in deeper water, one through truss which gave the maximum clearance over the navigation channel near the middle of the river, and one bowstring truss over the Carillon Canal. The roadway was 24 feet (7.3 m) wide and carried one traffic lane in each direction, with an additional 5-foot-wide (1.5 m) sidewalk on one side. All piers were set on bedrock.

=== Dedication ===
A dedication ceremony was held on the day of opening, with remarks by Hugh Stewart, the Canadian Minister of Public Works and a ribbon cutting by the wife of the bridge's namesake, George Perley. The bridge was blessed by the Roman Catholic Archbishop of Ottawa. The mayors of Hawkesbury and Grenville both spoke. The ceremony was preceded by parades from each town to the center of the bridge, where a special pavilion and been constructed. Also present were Perley, Élie-Oscar Bertrand MP of Prescott, and other government officials. Both Hawkesbury and Grenville declared the half-day starting at noon to be a holiday.

=== Trans-Canada Highway ===
In 1940, the proposed route of the Trans-Canada highway in eastern Ontario ran from Ottawa on Highway 17 to Hawkesbury and then across the bridge and on into Quebec. The highway was not formally enacted until 1949. Today, it traverses the area farther south on Highway 417 and crosses the river via the Île aux Tourtes Bridge outside Montreal.

== Reconstruction ==
Little was done to the bridge except routine maintenance such as painting until 1961, when a major modification occurred and the bridge was raised 8 to 10 feet (2.4 to 3.0 m). This was necessary to maintain a navigational clearance of 42 feet (13 m) after the construction of the dam at the Carillon Generating Station, a hydroelectric power station that was built between 1959 and 1964 approximately 12 mi (19 km) downstream from the bridge. Upon completion, the dam raised the water level by over 9 feet (2.7 m) at the bridge. The six truss spans in the center of the bridge were jacked higher by the Dominion Bridge Company. In preparation, the bridge was restricted to one lane for two months. Then, on December 13, all traffic was halted for 19 hours when the bridge was raised and then reopened to traffic.

The bridge lighting was upgraded in 1965 with 250-watt mercury lamps.

Maintenance of other inter-province bridges is shared by the national government and the provinces, each paying one-third of the cost. However, since Quebec paid a large share of the original construction cost, it was not responsible for maintenance. Ontario paid 25% of the costs, while Canada paid the remainder.

== Deterioration ==
The bridge was painted twice after the reconstruction, in 1963 and again in 1972–73. On March 4, 1973, a corner of one of the south trestle spans failed, dropping the roadway several inches. The bridge was quickly repaired and reopened to all traffic three days later. The failure led to an assessment of the safety of the bridge that began in 1973 by Public Works Canada, the Ministry of Transportation and Communications, and an Ottawa consulting engineer firm, M.M. Dillon Ltd.

Underwater inspection determined the piers were in good condition. The above-water superstructure, made mostly from open hearth steel was found to have many areas of severe corrosion and metal fatigue, including bearings, connecting angles, floor beams (some had been reduced in size by 50%), steel decking, expansion joints, and railing.

The study also looked at traffic and determined 11,000 to 12,000 vehicles crossed the bridge on average summer weekdays, 20% to 30% of which were trucks, including heavy logging trucks delivering timber from Quebec to a Hawkesbury paper mill, as well as various other kinds of heavy loads. It concluded that the bridge was carrying loads much in excess of is designed capacity.

Work was performed at the time to strengthen the structure so that it would support 80,000-pound (36,000 kg) loads. The work included various reinforcements and strengthening of the structure, including adding braces and replacing some rivets with high-strength bolts, and was considered a "short-term" solution. On October 22, 1974, signs were posted restricting loads to 80,000 lb (36,000 kg) and a control station on the Quebec side enforced this weight limit. After three months the Quebec government stopped staffing the control station, leading an MP to question if the bridge would last another three to five years.

One $280,000 repair was made in 1975. Other repairs were completed in 1978 and 1979. Marshall Steel of Laval, Quebec was awarded one contract for over $740,000 to strengthen trusses on the bridge.

Long-term upgrades were needed to achieve a load capacity of 162,500 lb (73,700 kg). One option considered was using the bridge for automobile traffic only and building a new bridge for heavy truck traffic. The other option was to upgrade the bridge to be able to carry heavy truck traffic on one lane and building a new bridge that would also have one lane for truck and another for cars. Total replacement was not considered because of the perceived value of the existing bridge. However, it was reported as early as 1974 that Public Works Canada felt a new bridge was considered necessary. At the time, an agreement for funding a new bridge could not be reached by the three involved governments.

== Replacement ==
Corrosion in a section of the deck that had been rehabilitated in 1979 was observed in 1985.

In 1986, agreement was reached by the Ottawa and Quebec provincial representatives and Don Boudria, MP for Glengarry–Prescott–Russell to support total replacement of the bridge, as had been sought by the Grenville and Hawkesbury municipal governments. Boudria said the bridge was in "a deplorable condition".

The Perley bridge was demolished in 1999 after the replacement bridge, built 80 ft (24 m) to the west, was opened.

Sections of the deck repaired in 1979 were cut out and transported to the laboratories of the Institute for Research in Construction (IRC) at the National Research Council (Canada), and the U.S. Department of Energy's (DOE) Albany Research Center for further examination. At the IRC, corrosion of epoxy-coated-rebar was studied by half-cell potential, linear polarization, and concrete resistivity measurement. At the DOE, scanning electron microscopy and X-ray wavelength analysis were used, with results analyzed by the University of Waterloo. A study determined that epoxy-coated-rebar, which was expected to greatly extend the life of the bridge deck, in fact offered only 1–4 years more protection than uncoated rebar.

== Cultural ==
The bridge has more closely joined Hawkesbury, with an 86% French-speaking population, and Grenville.

== See also ==
- List of crossings of the Ottawa River
