= List of crossings of the Ottawa River =

This is a list of bridges, dams, and ferries on the Ottawa River, proceeding stream upwards from the Saint Lawrence River, with the year in which they were opened.

== Crossings ==
=== Within Quebec ===
Across the east (or north) arm (channel) (Sainte-Anne-de-Bellevue Canal)
Span	Carries	Location	Year built	Coordinates
Galipeault Bridge	A-20	Sainte-Anne-de-Bellevue– Île Bellevue– Île Perrot	1924	
Canadian National Rail Bridge	CN Rail, Via Rail Canada (passenger trains to Ottawa/Toronto)	Sainte-Anne-de-Bellevue– Île Bellevue– Île Perrot		
Canadian Pacific Rail Bridge	CP Rail exo Vaudreuil-Hudson commuter train)	Sainte-Anne-de-Bellevue– Île Bellevue– Île Perrot		

Across the west (or south) arm (channel)
Span	Carries	Location	Year built	Coordinates
Canadian National Rail Bridge	CN Rail, Via Rail Canada (passenger trains to Ottawa/Toronto)	Île Perrot–Dorion		
Canadian Pacific Rail Bridge	CP Rail exo Vaudreuil-Hudson commuter train	Île Perrot–Dorion		
Taschereau Bridge	A-20	Île Perrot–Dorion		

Across the Lake of Two Mountains and main river stem
Span	Carries	Location	Year built	Notes	Coordinates
Île aux Tourtes Bridge	A-40 (TCH)	Senneville– Île Girwood– Île aux Tortues– Vaudreuil-Dorion			
Oka Ferry		Oka–Hudson		seasonal	
Hudson - Oka Icebridge		Oka–Hudson		seasonal	
Saint-André-d'Argenteuil - Pointe-Fortune Ice Bridge		Saint-André-d'Argenteuil–Pointe Fortune		seasonal	
Carillon - Pointe-Fortune Ferry		Carillon–Pointe Fortune		seasonal; replaced by St-Andre d'argenteuil ice bridge in winter	

=== Quebec–Ontario ===
Span	Carries	Location	Year built	Notes	Coordinates
Carillon generating station	(no road access across dam)	Carillon–East Hawkesbury			
Long-Sault Bridge		Grenville–Hawkesbury		replaced the Perley Bridge	
Fassett - Lefaivre Ferry		Fassett–Lefaivre		replaced by an ice bridge in Winter	
Thurso - Rockland Ferry		Thurso–Rockland		restarted operation 3 October 2008	
Masson - Cumberland Ferry		Masson–Cumberland	1939	year-round	
Macdonald-Cartier Bridge	A-5 (Quebec Side)	Gatineau–Ottawa	1965		45°26′12″N 75°42′9″W
Alexandra Bridge	Formerly a Canadian Pacific Railway bridge	Gatineau–Ottawa	1901		45°25′48″N 75°42′17″W
Portage Bridge		Gatineau–Ottawa	1973	via Victoria Island	45°25′20″N 75°42′49″W
Chaudière Bridge		Gatineau–Ottawa	1919	via Chaudière and Victoria Islands	45°25′16″N 75°43′7″W
Hull-2		Gatineau–Ottawa	1920		45.42143°N 75.719728°W
Chief William Commanda Bridge	Formerly a Canadian Pacific Railway bridge	Gatineau–Ottawa	1880	via Lemieux Island	45°24′56″N 75°43′40″W
Champlain Bridge		Gatineau–Ottawa	1928	via Riopelle, Cunningham and Bate Islands	45°24′35″N 75°45′34″W
West Carleton-Quyon Ferry		Quyon–Quyon Ferry Landing		seasonal (April–December)	45.513354°N 76.225128°W
Chute-des-Chats generating station	(no road access across dam)	Île Mohr–Fitzroy Harbour	1932		45°28′30″N 76°14′18″W
unnamed railway bridge	Ottawa Central Railway (formerly Canadian National Railway)	Pontiac–Morris Island			45.4665°N 76.2863°W
unnamed road bridge		Portage-du-Fort–Chenaux			45.580810°N 76.671944°W
Chenaux Generating Station		Portage-du-Fort–Chenaux	1950		
unnamed railway bridge	Ottawa Central Railway (formerly Canadian National Railway - rail removed but structure still there)	Portage-du-Fort–McLarens Settlement			45.6134°N 76.6714°W
Pont Des Allumettes Bridge	R-148; Highway 148	L'Isle-aux-Allumettes (Saint-Joseph)–Pembroke	2015 (original built 1953)		45.80753°N 77.04253°W
Pont Des Joachims Bridge	Renfrew County Road 635 (Ontario Side)	Rapides-des-Joachims–Rolphton	1950		46.19153°N 77.68378°W
Des Joachim Generating Station	(no road access across dam)	Rapides-des-Joachims–Rolphton	1942–1948		46.18289°N 77.69684°W
Deux-Rivières Ferry		Quebec–Deux-Rivières			46.25994°N 78.28877°W
unnamed railway bridge	(formerly Canadian Pacific Railway)	Quebec–Mattawa			46.32303°N 78.70467°W
Otto Holden Generating Station	(no road access across dam)	La Cave–Mattawa	1952		46.37876°N 78.724499°W
Temiscaming Generating Station	R-101; Highway 63	Témiscaming–Thorne			

=== Within Quebec ===
Span	Carries	Location	Year built	Notes	Coordinates
unnamed road bridge	R-101	Notre-Dame-du-Nord			
Première-Chute Generating Station	no road access	Notre-Dame-du-Nord			
Rapides-des-Îles Generating Station	local road access	Notre-Dame-du-Nord			
Rapides-des-Quinze Generating Station	no road access	Quebec			
Lac-des-Quinze Generating Station	local road access	Laverlochère-Angliers			
Grassy Narrow Bridge		Quebec		covered bridge	
Rapide-Deux Generating Station	local road access	Rapide-Deux			
Rapide-Sept Generating Station	local road access	Rapide-Sept			
unnamed road bridge		Rapides Twin			
unnamed road bridge					47.66876°N 77.52361°W ?
Bourque Generating Station	local road access	Ukunemakak			
unnamed road bridge					

== See also ==
- List of bridges in Ottawa
- List of bridges to the Island of Montreal
- List of crossings of the Rivière des Prairies
- List of crossings of the Rivière des Mille Îles
- List of hydroelectric stations
- List of Ontario generating stations on the Ottawa River
- List of reservoirs and dams in Canada
- List of reservoirs and dams in Quebec
