= Chenail Island =

Island in Ontario, Canada

île du Chenail (Chenail Island
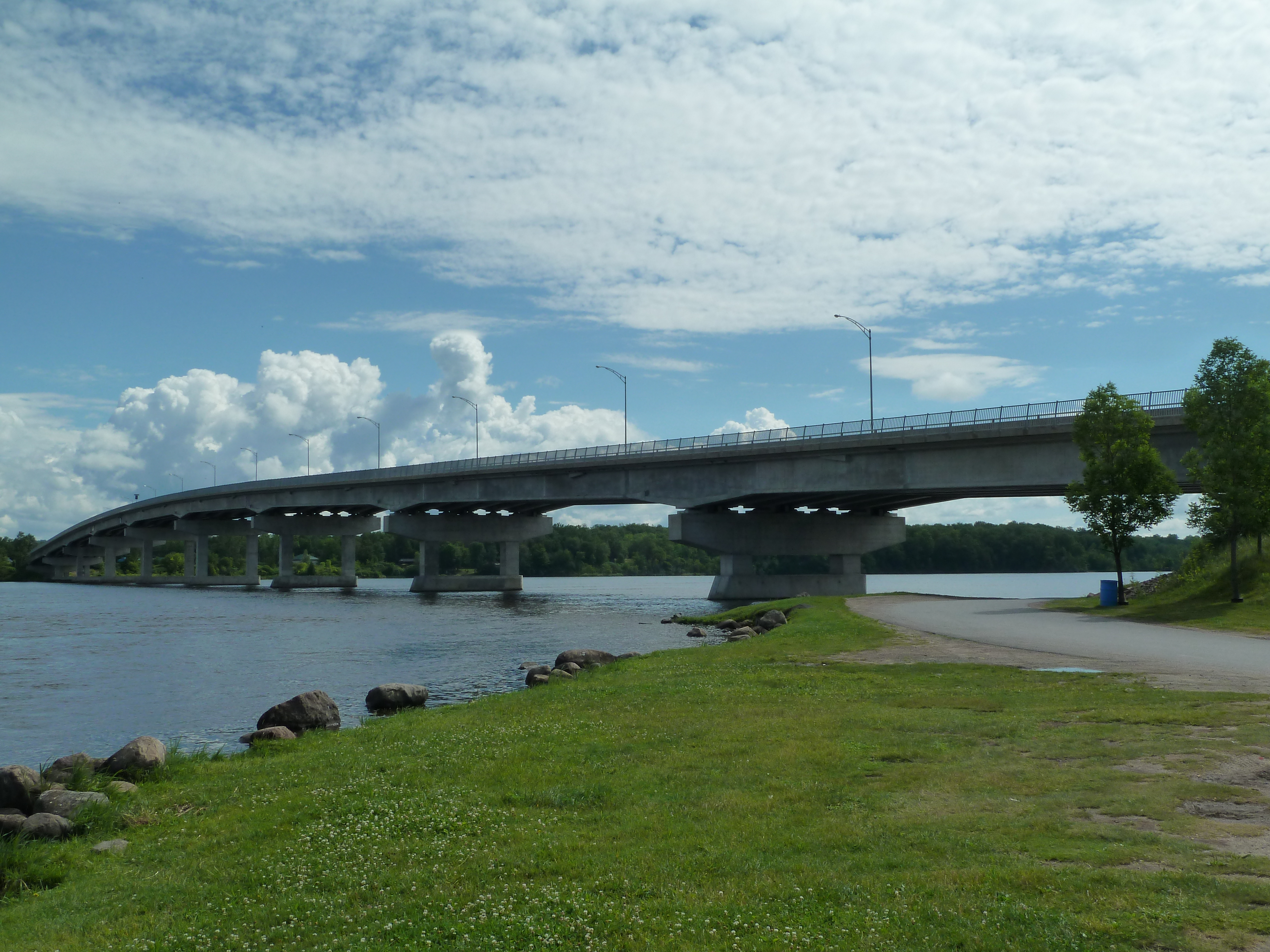
- Long-Sault Bridge from Chenail Island over the Ottawa River
- Interactive map of île du Chenail (Chenail Island

Geography
- Location: Ottawa River
- Coordinates: 45°36′52″N 74°36′04″W

Administration
- Canada
- Province: Ontario
- County: Prescott and Russell
- Municipality: Hawkesbury

Demographics
- Population: Uninhabited

Chenail Island (officially in French: île du Chenail) is an uninhabited island in the Ottawa River of Ontario, Canada. It is part of the town of Hawkesbury, Ontario, and across the river from Grenville, Quebec. The only road on the island, the four-lane St. John Street, connects Ontario Highway 34 in Hawkesbury and Quebec Route 344 in Grenville via the Perley Bridge (1931 to 1998) and its replacement, the Long-Sault Bridge.

== History ==
The channel between the island and Hawkesbury was called the "Chenaille Escarté" (lost channel) by early French-Canadian settlers. An English corruption of the term, "Snye Carty", was later shortened to "The Snye" and came to represent the village. Nearby Hamilton Island was the location of an early gristmill and sawmill built by two Americans, Thomas Mears and David Pattee, around 1815. After having financial trouble, the properties were taken over by the mortgagees, brothers John and Robert Hamilton. The sawmill processed logs that were floated down the river after being cut, with much of the lumber being exported to England. The mill complex, known as Hawkesbury or Hamilton Mills, was expanded many times into the largest sawmill in Canada during the 19th century, employing over 1000 people.

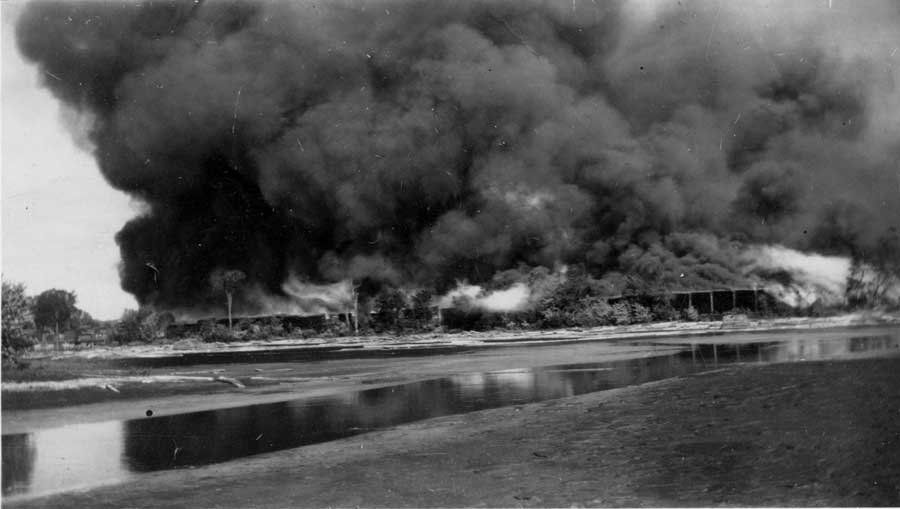
1925 mill fire

The offices of the mill were on Chenail Island, which was at the time a thriving center of commerce and the original town center of Hawkesbury. A fire destroyed the mill complex in 1925.

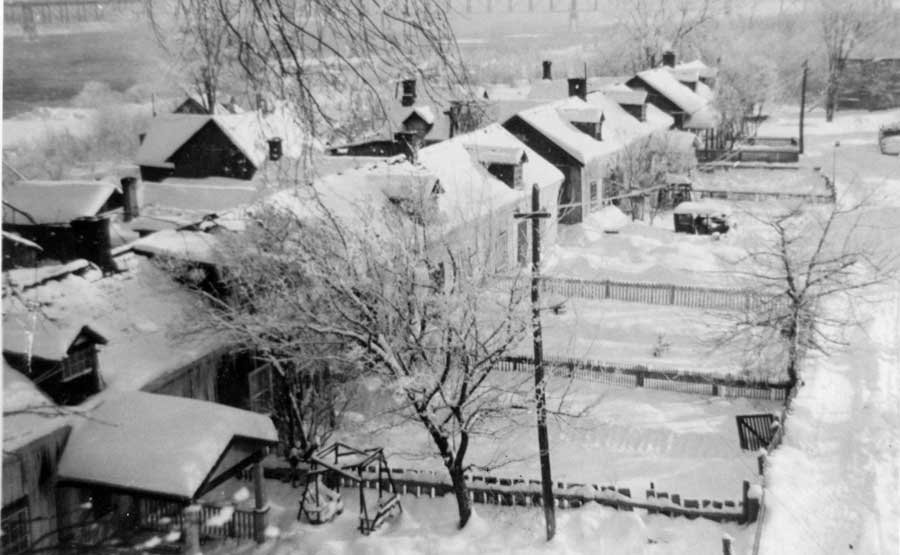
1940-era Chenail Island houses, later demolished

In the early 1960s, the size of the island was reduced when construction of the Carillon Generating Station, a hydroelectric power station that was built approximately 12 mi (19 km) downstream from the island raised the water level by over 9 feet (2.7 m) submerging much of the island and forcing the residents to leave. Plans to build embankments that would have protected some properties were rejected by residents who did not want to live behind them. In addition to large tracts of farmland, approximately 35 commercial and 200 residential parcels in Hawkesbury were expropriated, including all of the parcels (approximately 50) on Chenail Island.

== Geography ==
The island's average elevation is 37 m (121 ft). The entire island is a public park (Confederation Park) of approximately 20 acres (8.1 ha) that was constructed at the time the island was depopulated and largely submerged.

== Attractions ==
=== Chenail Cultural Center ===
Chenail Island is the location of Chenail Cultural Centre, a non-profit organization that promotes local French-Canadian culture and the history of the Maison de l'Ile (Island House), the only significant structure on the island. The house, built c.1835, is the oldest building in Hawkesbury and was originally the office of John Hamilton who was later appointed to the Senate in the Canadian Confederation of 1867.

The town government, which owns the building, attempted to restrict the Chenail Cultural Centre to the second floor so that it could use the first floor as a tourist information center. The town later said it did not need the entire first floor, and a dispute led the town to call for eviction. A judge rejected the eviction in November, 2016.

=== Monument de la Francophonie ===
The 15th Monument of the Francophonie of Ontario is located on Chenail Island. The monument features a fleur-de-lys, the symbol of the Francophonie, surrounded by a man and woman's hand and encircled by 13 maple leaf benches representing the Canadian provinces and territories. The sculptures, made of stone and at human scale, were dedicated on November 28, 2014. There is also a large Franco-Ontarian flag on a 25-metre (82 ft) flagpole.

=== Snye/Le Chenail Monument ===
The Town of Hawkesbury placed a monument on the island in 2009 to honour approximately forty families that once resided on the island before their land was expropriated by the government for the power station.

== Gallery ==
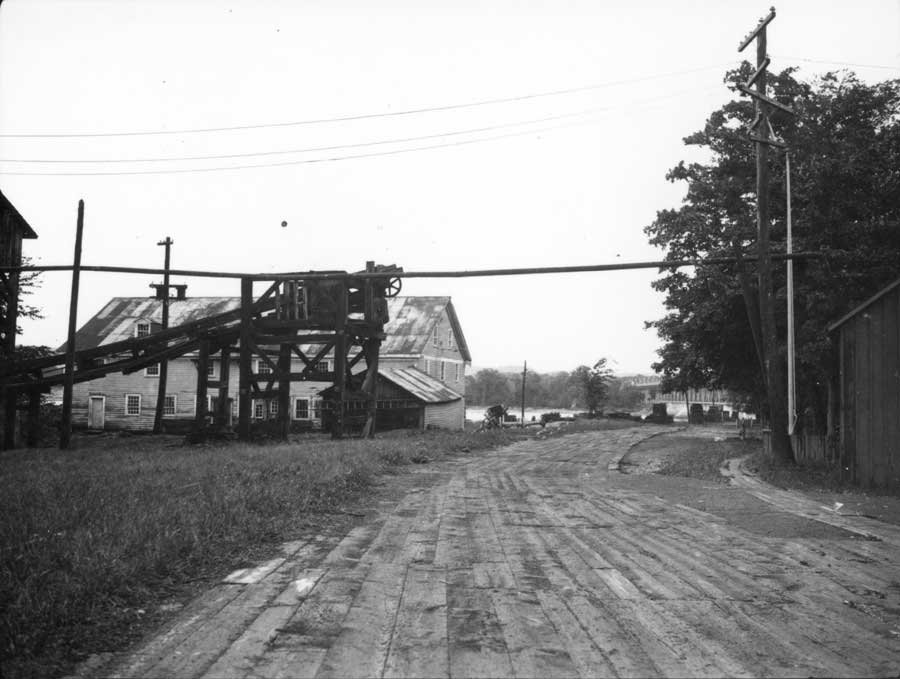
Log Road, 1925

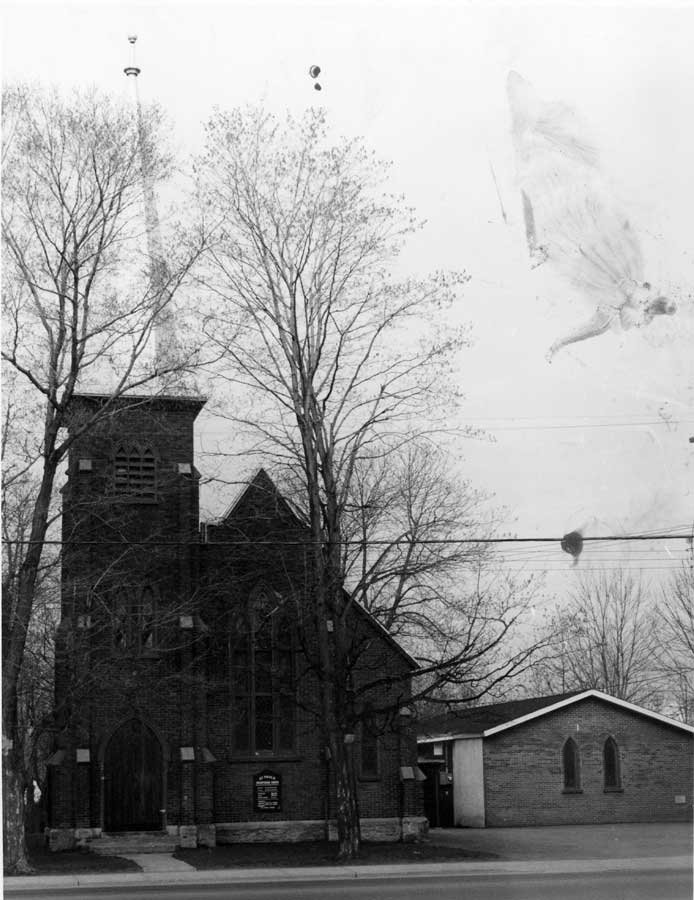
Church, 1940 or earlier

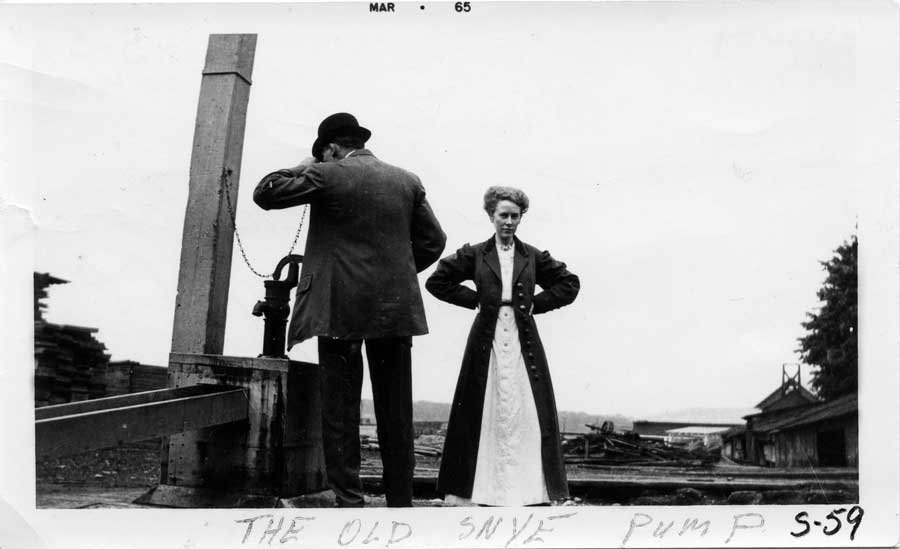
Manual water pump, 1930s
