= Pierre Mantha =

Canadian businessperson

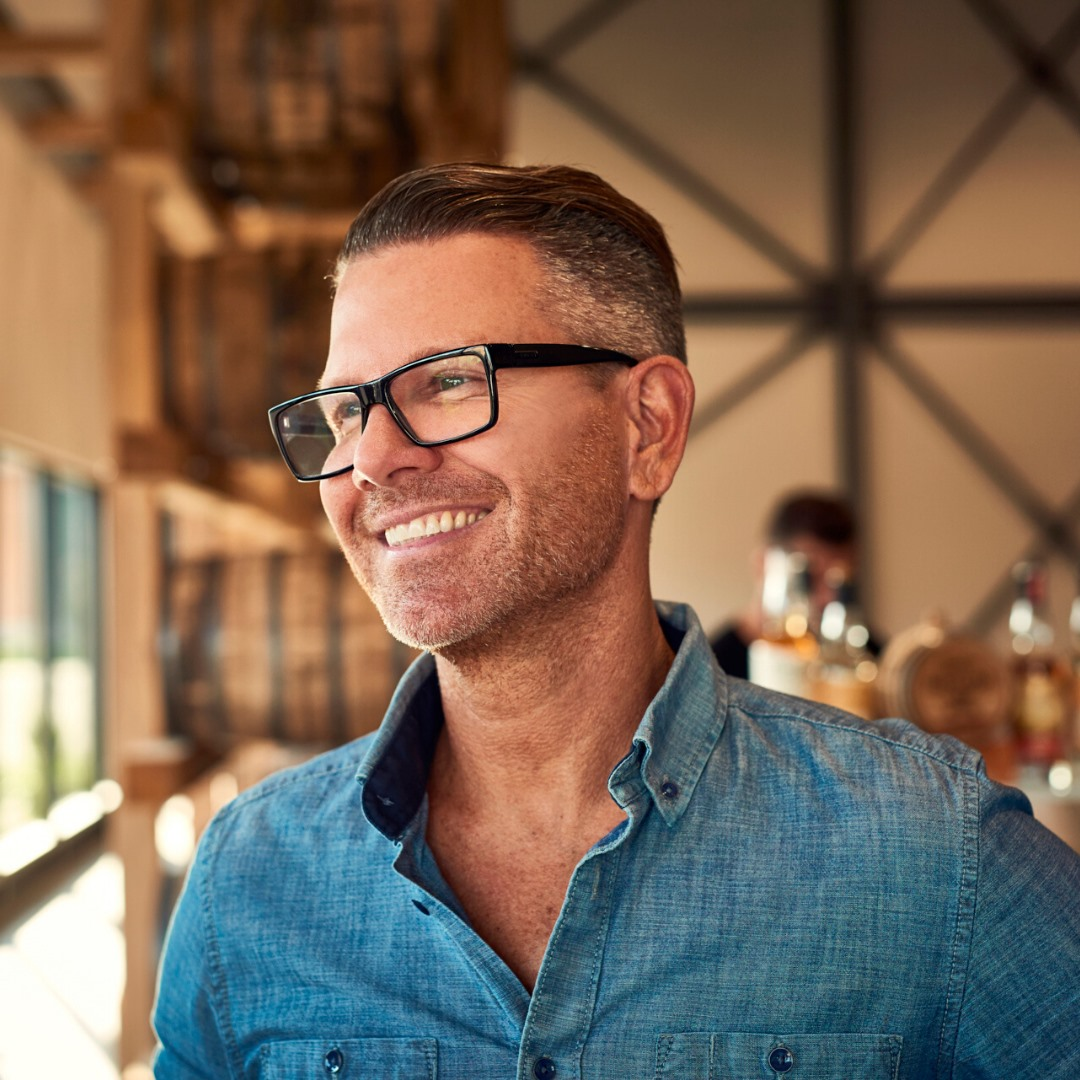
- Pierre Mantha 2023
- Born: Gatineau, Quebec
- Occupations: Businessperson, Distiller

Pierre Mantha is a Canadian businessperson and distiller. In 2017 he founded the Artist in Residence Distillerie, an artisanal gin, vodka, and whiskey distillery in Quebec.

== Early life ==
Mantha was born in Gatineau. His family background and upbringing was both French and English. Mantha was raised by a single mother in a family with three children. His father, who later returned, was a mechanic. Mantha decided to train as a mechanic. He also built racing cars.

== Career ==
=== Early career ===
Mantha founded a commercial trucking company in the early 1990s. He started with heavy truck dealerships, and formally established the business as Hino Gatineau in 2003. In 2013, Mantha founded Mantha Corp, which included a leasing company, a holding company, and three truck dealerships in Gatineau and Ottawa.

=== AiR Distillerie ===
After a Colombian friend explained the basics of making alcohol and told him Quebec had some of the world’s best water, Mantha decided to start a distillery business, even though he didn't drink. Initially, he meant for the venture to be a side project. Mantha toured some American facilities.

In 2016, Mantha founded Artist in Residence Distillerie (AiR), distillery, which opened in Gatineau in 2017. He chose the name to refer to the “artist” distiller behind each of the products. He used $700,000 of his own money plus loans from the Canadian government to start the business, at first making gin and a low-calorie and low alcohol vodka. His brother Michel worked with him to open a 40,000 square feet distillery.

Mantha chose an older production method, based on local ingredients, despite it costing $10 to produce a liter of vodka instead of $2 with purchased ethanol. Spring water the distillery used for its beverages came from a well underneath the facility and corn was supplied from local fields. He added whiskey to the distillery’s product line in 2022.

Mantha said that he devised a new distillery in Hawkesbury, Ontario under construction in 2022 to provide opportunities for regional agritourism.

== Personal life ==
Mantha is married and has two children.
