= Ontario Highway 34 =

Ontario provincial highway

Highway 34

Route information
- Maintained by the Ministry of Transportation of Ontario
- Length: 17.8 km (11.1 mi)
- Existed: November 26, 1930–present

Major junctions
- South end: Highway 417 near Vankleek Hill
- East end: John Street / Main Street East in Hawkesbury

Location
- Country: Canada
- Province: Ontario

Highway system
- Ontario provincial highways; Current; Former; 400-series
← Highway 33	→ Highway 35

King's Highway 34, commonly referred to as Highway 34, is a provincially maintained highway in the Canadian province of Ontario. The route connects Highway 417 south of Vankleek Hill with Hawkesbury. It is 16.9 kilometres (10.5 mi) long, traveling through a mostly rural portion of the lower Ottawa Valley near the Ontario–Quebec border. The highway formerly continued 40 kilometres (25 mi) south of Highway 417 to Highway 2 in Lancaster. However, this section was decommissioned as a provincial highway and was subsequently redesignated as Stormont, Dundas and Glengarry County Road 34.

== Route description ==
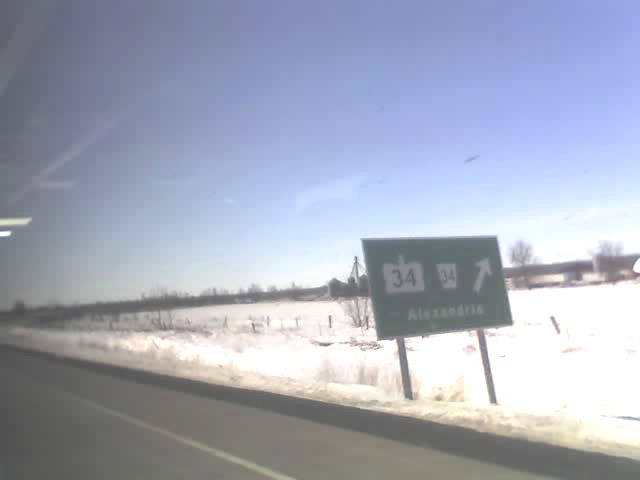
Highway 417 exit to Highway 34

Highway 34 is short highway which today serves to connect the town of Hawkesbury with Highway 417. The 16.9-kilometre (11 mi) route ends at Main Street, near the Ottawa River in downtown Hawkesbury. Between these two points, with the exception of the town of Vankleek Hill, the highway traverses the rural Ottawa Valley, remaining straight in a southwest–northeast orientation except through Hawkesbury. The majority of the land use surrounding the highway is composed of commercial shops in urban areas and agricultural in rural areas, though some small woodlots exist alongside the route. Two interchanges exist along the route: at the southern terminus with Highway 417 and with Prescott and Russell County Road 17 (former Highway 17).

Like other provincial routes in Ontario, Highway 17 was maintained by the Ministry of Transportation of Ontario. In 1989, traffic surveys conducted by the ministry showed that on average, 5,050 vehicles used the highway daily along the section between Highway 417 and Vankleek Hill while 16,400 vehicles did so each day along the section between Prescott and Russell County Road 17 and Hawkesbury, the highest and lowest counts along the highway, respectively.

== History ==
Highway 34 has a very tame history, having been assumed in 1930 and remaining unchanged between then and the highway downloads of the late 1990s, with the exception of an interchange with Highway 417 opened in late 1974.

On November 26, 1930, the Department of Highways assumed the road between Lancaster and Hawkesbury as King's Highway 34, providing a connection between Highway 2 and Highway 17 immediately west of the Ontario–Quebec border. The route was 55.7 kilometres (34.6 mi) long at the time of its assumption. On November 8, 1974, Highway 417 opened between Prescott and Russell County Road 9 (Highland Road) and the existing Highway 17 near from the Quebec border, with an interchange located at Highway 34. Highway 34 otherwise remained unchanged for over 60 years.

However, budget constraints brought on by a recession in the 1990s resulted in the Mike Harris provincial government forming the Who Does What? committee to determine cost-cutting measures in order to balance the budget after a deficit incurred by former premier Bob Rae. It was determined that many Ontario highways no longer serve long-distance traffic movement and should, therefore, be maintained by local or regional levels of government. The MTO consequently transferred many highways to lower levels of government in 1997 and 1998, removing a significant percentage of the provincial highway network. It was determined that the portion of Highway 34 south of Highway 417 had largely been supplanted by the nearby Highway 138, and no longer served long-distance traffic movement. As such, the section of Highway 34 within the United Counties of Stormont, Dundas and Glengarry was decommissioned as a provincial highway and transferred to that jurisdiction on January 1, 1998. It has since been redesignated as Stormont, Dundas and Glengarry County Road 34.

== Major intersections ==
The following table lists the major junctions along Highway 34, as noted by the Ministry of Transportation of Ontario.

Division	Location	km	mi	Destinations	Notes
Stormont, Dundas and Glengarry	South Glengarry	−43.7	−27.2	Highway 401 – Cornwall, Montreal; County Road 2 County Road 34 begins	Lancaster; former Highway 34 southern terminus; Highway 401 exit 814; formerly Highway 2
Stormont, Dundas and Glengarry	North Glengarry	−21.3	−13.2	County Road 43 west (Kenyon Street)	Alexandria; formerly Highway 43 west
Stormont, Dundas and Glengarry	North Glengarry	−6.8	−4.2	County Road 23A north	McCrimmon; alternate connection to Highway 417 (exit 35)
Stormont, Dundas and Glengarry – Prescott and Russell boundary	North Glengarry – Champlain boundary	0.0	0.0	Highway 417 / TCH – Ottawa, Montreal Highway 34 begins County Road 34 ends	Highway 34 southern terminus; Highway 417 exit 27
Prescott and Russell	Champlain (Vankleek Hill)	5.3	3.3		Beginning of Vankleek Hill Connecting Link agreement
Prescott and Russell	Champlain (Vankleek Hill)	6.2	3.9	County Road 10 (Main Street)	
Prescott and Russell	Champlain (Vankleek Hill)	6.7	4.2		End of Vankleek Hill Connecting Link agreement
Prescott and Russell	Champlain – Hawkesbury boundary	15.4	9.6	County Road 17 – Ottawa, Montreal	Formerly Highway 17; grade-separated interchange
Prescott and Russell	Hawkesbury	15.5	9.6		Hawkesbury town limits; beginning of Hawkesbury Connecting Link agreement
Prescott and Russell	Hawkesbury	17.8	11.1	Highway 34 ends County Road 4 (Main Street)	End of Hawkesbury Connecting Link agreement; original alignment of Highway 17 prior to construction of Carillon Generating Station in 1964.
Ottawa River		19.2– 19.8	11.9– 12.3	Long-Sault Bridge	
Ottawa River		19.2– 19.8	11.9– 12.3	R-344 north – Grenville	Continuation into Quebec
1.000 mi = 1.609 km; 1.000 km = 0.621 mi: Closed/former; Route transition
