= Linda Cardinal =

Franco-Ontarian political scientist

- Born: July 13, 1959 (age 67); Hawkesbury, Ontario, Canada
- Awards: Order of Canada; Ordre des Palmes Académiques

Academic background
- Education: BA., MA., University of Ottawa; PhD., Sociology, 1987, School for Advanced Studies in the Social Sciences
- Thesis: Autonomie et contestation: étude des mouvements étudiants et féministes aux Etats-Unis et en France, 1950-1975 (1988)

Academic work
- Discipline: Political Science
- Institutions: University College Dublin; University of Sorbonne Nouvelle Paris 3 University of Ottawa
- Main interests: language minority issues, language policies and language development

Linda Cardinal OC FRSC (born July 13, 1959) is a Franco-Ontarian political scientist. She is a University Professor and a Canada Research Chair in Canadian Francophonie and Public Policies at the University of Ottawa. Cardinal was elected a Fellow of the Royal Society of Canada in 2013 and honoured with the Ordre des Palmes Académiques and Member of the Order of Canada. She was also the first coordinator of the francophone studies program at the University of Ottawa.

== Early life and education ==
Cardinal was born in Hawkesbury, Ontario on July 13, 1959. She received a Bachelor of Arts and Master's degree from the University of Ottawa and a doctorate in Paris from the School for Advanced Studies in the Social Sciences.

== Career ==
After earning her PhD in 1987, Cardinal worked as a professor in the Department of Sociology at the University of Ottawa. Beginning as an adjunct professor in 1987, she worked her way up to full professor in the School of Political Studies by 1995. From there, Cardinal served as president of the Network of Women's Researchers in French Ontario between 1999 and 2002. In this capacity, she published "The Commitment to Thinking: Writing in a Francophone Minority Community in Canada" and "Chronicles of a Chaotic Political Life: Ontario Francophone from 1986 to 1996." Cardinal was subsequently hired as the Craig-Dobbin Chair of Canadian Studies at University College Dublin from 2002 to 2004. During this time, she simultaneously directed the academic journal "Politique et societies". She also collaborated with David Headon to create "Shaping Nations: Constitutionalism and Society in Australia and Canada," which combined the scholarly work of both Canadian and Australian scholars to question the ideas of nationhood and national identity.

In 2005, Cardinal was approached by Marcel Castonguay, director of the Coordinator of French Language Services (FLS), to conduct a study regarding the FLS and justice system. As part of the Coalition des intervenantes et intervenants francophones en justice, Cardinal published "Coalition des intervenantes et intervenants francophones en justice: a community innovation to increase the offer of French-language services in Ontario" with Marie-Ève Levert, Danielle Manton and Sonia Ouellet.

In 2006, she held the chair in Canadian studies at the University of Sorbonne Nouvelle Paris 3 and co-chaired the International Association of Political Science RC 50 on Language and Politics until 2012. In 2007, Cardinal published "Managing Diversity: Practices of Citizenship" with Nicholas Brown. She also sat on the Executive committee of the International Association of Political Science and served as President of the Société québécoise de science politique for one term in 2008–09. On April 1, 2008, she was elected to the board of directors for the Center de la Francophonie des Amériques. Cardinal used her position on the board to continue to emphasize the historical impact Franco-Ontarians had in the development of Canada. The following year, Cardinal was awarded the University of Ottawa's Excellence in Research Award.

In 2011, Cardinal traveled to the University of Helsinki, where she worked as a professor and guest lecturer at the Center for Research on Ethnic Relations and Nationalism. She also became the first coordinator of the Francophonie Studies program at the University of Ottawa, which she served until 2014. After which she became the director of the undergraduate program in political science and served of the university's board of governors.

In 2013, she was awarded the Ordre des Palmes Académiques and elected a Fellow of the Royal Society of Canada. She also worked with Jacques de Courville Nicol to co-found the Movement for an Official Bilingual Capital of Canada. Cardinal stated she co-founded this movement to ensure "that French does not lose its legitimacy as a language in Canada." The following year, Cardinal collaborated with Simon Jolivet and Isabelle Matte to publish "Le Québec et l'Irlande: culture, histoire, identité." The book was a compilation of text to showcase the similarities between Irish Catholics and French Canadians in 19th century Quebec, such as historical, cultural, religious, social, political and identity ties.

In February 2017, Cardinal was awarded the Bernard Grandmaître Award from the Association of Francophone Communities of Ottawa for her commitment to the Francophone community. She was also named a Member of the Order of Canada for her public policy developments. Cardinal worked with fellow University of Ottawa professor Sébastien Grammond to published a book "Une tradition et un droit, le Sénat et la représentation de la francophonie canadienne" detailing how the French language played a role in shaping the Canadian Constitution, legislation and evolution of Canada. In October 2017, the Law Commission of Ontario nominated Cardinal to their Board of Governors and she was officially appointed in June 2018.

In January 2018, Cardinal was named one of the top 10 influential francophone personalities by the Francopresse. In June 2018, she was awarded the Association des juristes d'expression française de l'Ontario (AJEFO) Order of Merit. The following month, Cardinal was appointed by the president of the University of Ottawa to create a mandate regarding the state of French on campus.

Cardinal continued her writing and collaborated with Anne Gilbert, Michel Bock, Lucie Hotte, and François Charbonneau to co-edit "Ottawa, lieu de vie français. The book focused on the impact Ottawa francophones had in shaping their city, from the 1960s to contemporary French Ottawa. Her co-edited book was named a finalist for the 2019 Canada Prize in the Humanities and Social Sciences. In May 2019, Cardinal was loaned to the Université de l'Ontario français to help develop a research strategy to integrate into the organization of the Francophone Carrefour of Knowledge and Innovation.

== Selected publications ==
The following is a list of selected publications:

- Shaping nations: Constitutionalism and society in Australia and Canada (2002)
- Managing Diversity: Practices of Citizenship (2007)
- Les politiques publiques au Canada: pouvoir, conflits et idéologies (2009)
- Le conservatisme: le Canada et le Québec en contexte (2009)
- Le Québec et l'Irlande: culture, histoire, identité (2014)
- Une tradition et un droit, le Sénat et la représentation de la francophonie canadienne (2017)
