= Galipeault Bridge =

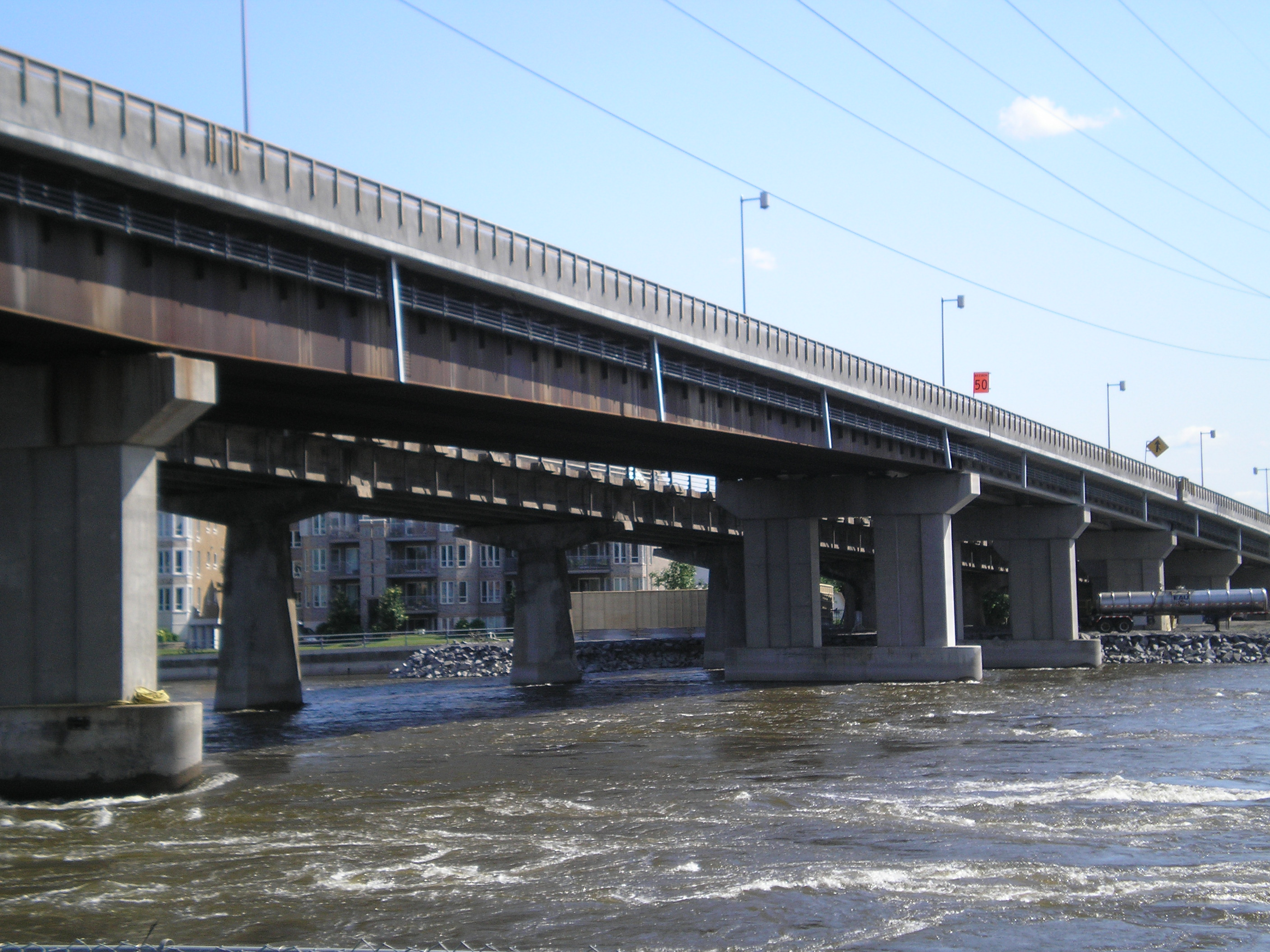
- Coordinates: 45°24′10″N 73°57′21″W
- Carries: A-20
- Crosses: Ottawa River (East channel)
- Locale: Sainte-Anne-de-Bellevue, Quebec
- Official name: Pont Galipeault

History
- Opened: 1925

Statistics
- Daily traffic: 54,000 daily

The Galipeault Bridge is a bridge on the western tip of the Island of Montreal, spanning the Ottawa River between Sainte-Anne-de-Bellevue and L'Île-Perrot, Quebec, Canada. It carries five lanes of Autoroute 20 (two westbound, three eastbound, with the right eastbound lane lead to Exit 39), and was named after Antonin Galipeault, who was minister of public works under Louis-Alexandre Taschereau. Incidentally, Taschereau Bridge, along the same highway, was part of the same project. The first span was built in 1924, a girder bridge that was replaced in 1991 by another structure of the same type, using the same foundations. It was doubled in 1964 with a cable-stayed bridge, which carried the eastbound lanes of Autoroute 20 until its demolition early in 2008.

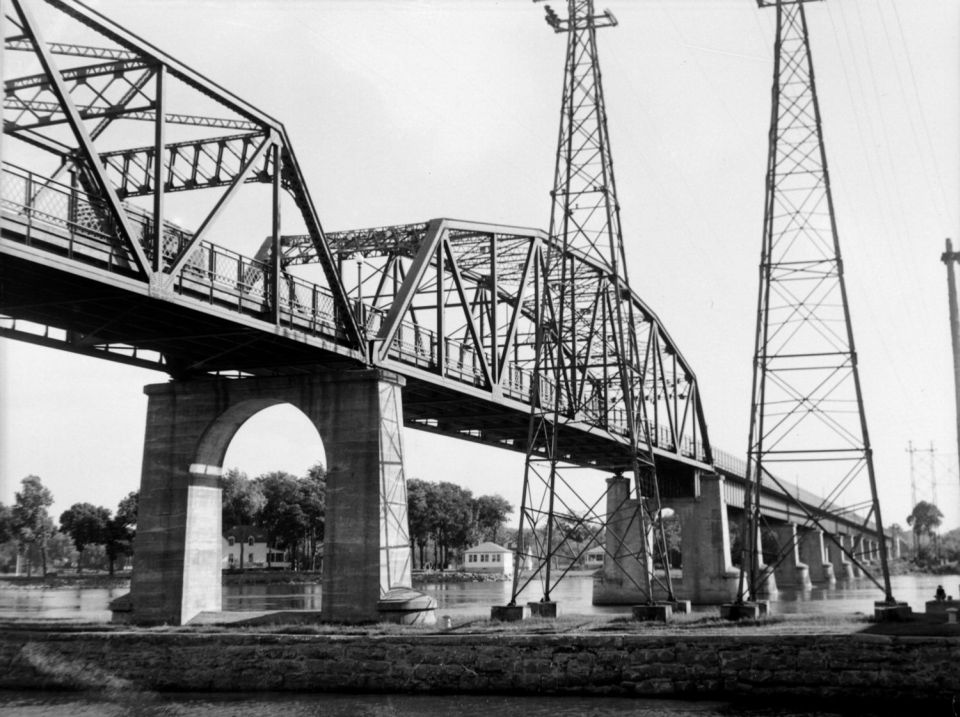
Galipeault Bridge between Sainte-Anne-de-Bellevue and l'île Perrot. July 20, 1948.

The 1964 doubling of the structure was done to appease business interests in L'Île-Perrot and Dorion who were worried that the abandoning of the unfinished Île Bray Bridge in favor of the nearby Île aux Tourtes Bridge, which avoids Perrot Island completely, might hurt their activities. The original plan for a freeway out of Montreal to the west called for upgrading the highway between Galipeault and Taschereau bridges to freeway standards, the doubling of Taschereau, and the construction of a new bridge in the vicinity of Galipeault, which would have connected with Autoroute 40 on the Sainte-Anne-de-Bellevue side. The bridge in question, Île Bray Bridge, which was never finished, was already under construction when the transportation ministry changed its plans in favor of a long span across Lake of Two Mountains.

The 1991 span carried the westbound lanes until the demolition of the eastbound structure forced its use as a two-way span. The eastbound span's construction was finished in early October and opened November 28, 2009.

Like Taschereau, Galipeault was built next to a Grand Trunk Railroad bridge that was part of the first fixed link from Montreal to the outside world.

The bridge is used by 54,000 vehicles every day, or 19.7 million a year, making it among the busiest bridges in Montreal.

== See also ==
- List of bridges in Montreal
- List of bridges in Canada
- List of crossings of the Ottawa River
