= Taschereau Bridge =

Bridge in Canada

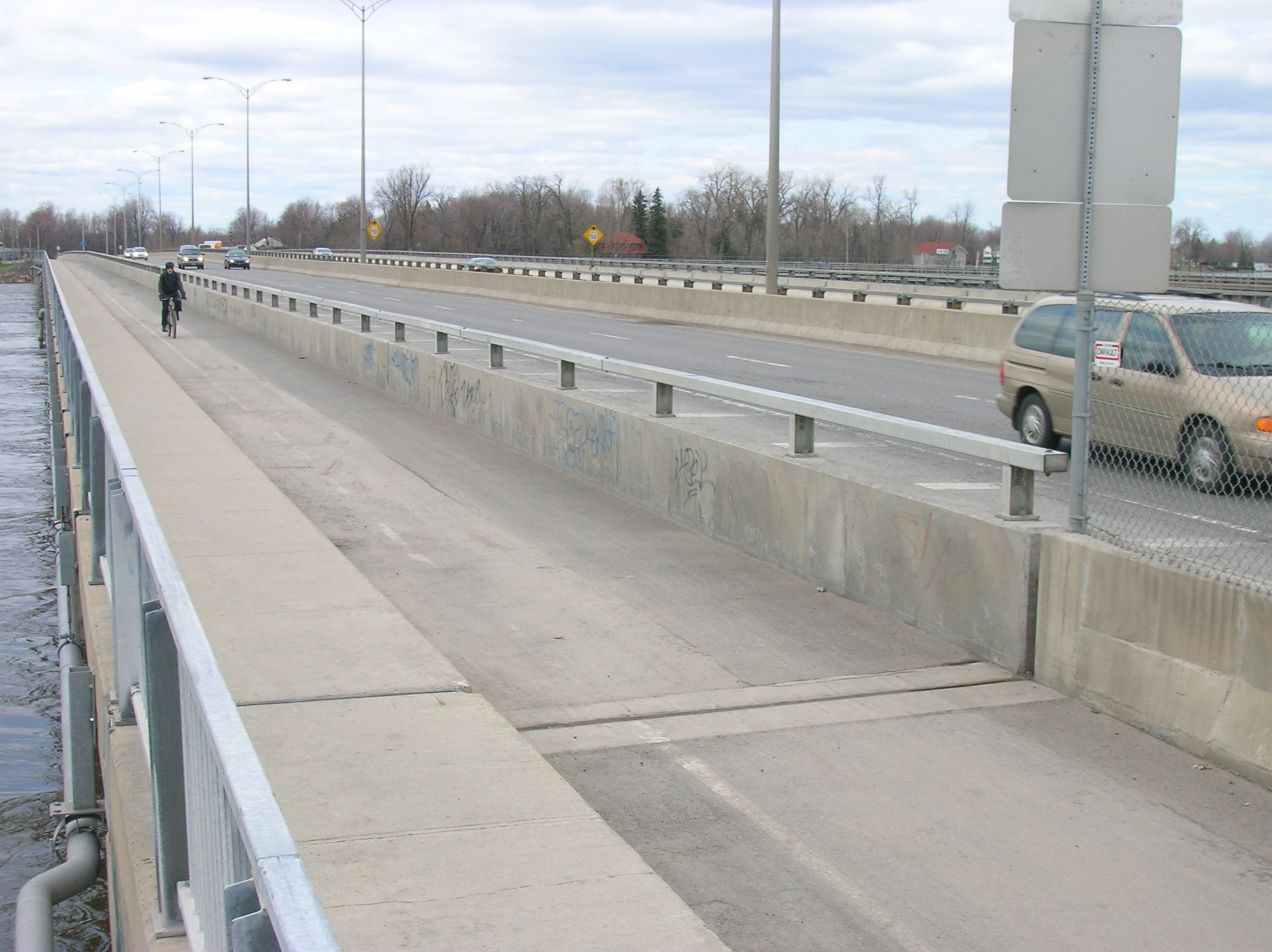
- Coordinates: 45°23′09″N 74°00′05″W
- Carries: A-20
- Crosses: Ottawa River (West channel)
- Locale: Dorion, Quebec
- Official name: Pont Taschereau
- Maintained by: Transports Québec

Characteristics
- Width: 4 lanes

History
- Opened: 1925

Taschereau Bridge is a bridge linking Pincourt, on Île Perrot, to Vaudreuil-Dorion, in the Vaudreuil-Soulanges RMC across the West Channel of the Ottawa River. The bridge was originally built in 1925, and was doubled in 1964, as part of the same project as Galipeault Bridge, which links the island to Montreal Island, but it has been maintained independently since then. Both bridges carry four lanes of Quebec Autoroute 20, which becomes Harwood Boulevard on the Dorion side. The bridge also carries a bicycle path, and is part of Route Verte 5.

The widening of this bridge and Galipeault Bridge in 1964, both of them from two lanes to four, was done in a bid to appease Perrot Island residents and merchants, who were worried that the construction of nearby Île aux Tourtes Bridge, which provides a way around the island, would hurt their businesses. A medium-size shopping mall, Le Faubourg de l'Île, was built next to the bridge on the Pincourt side, at the Cardinal Léger exit.

Like Galipeault Bridge, which it continues, Taschereau Bridge was built next to a Grand Trunk Railroad bridge that was built in 1854, and was the first fixed link between Montreal and the mainland. The bridge was named after Louis-Alexandre Taschereau, who was Premier of Quebec at the time of its inauguration.

== See also ==
- List of bridges in Canada
- List of crossings of the Ottawa River
