= Long-Sault Bridge =

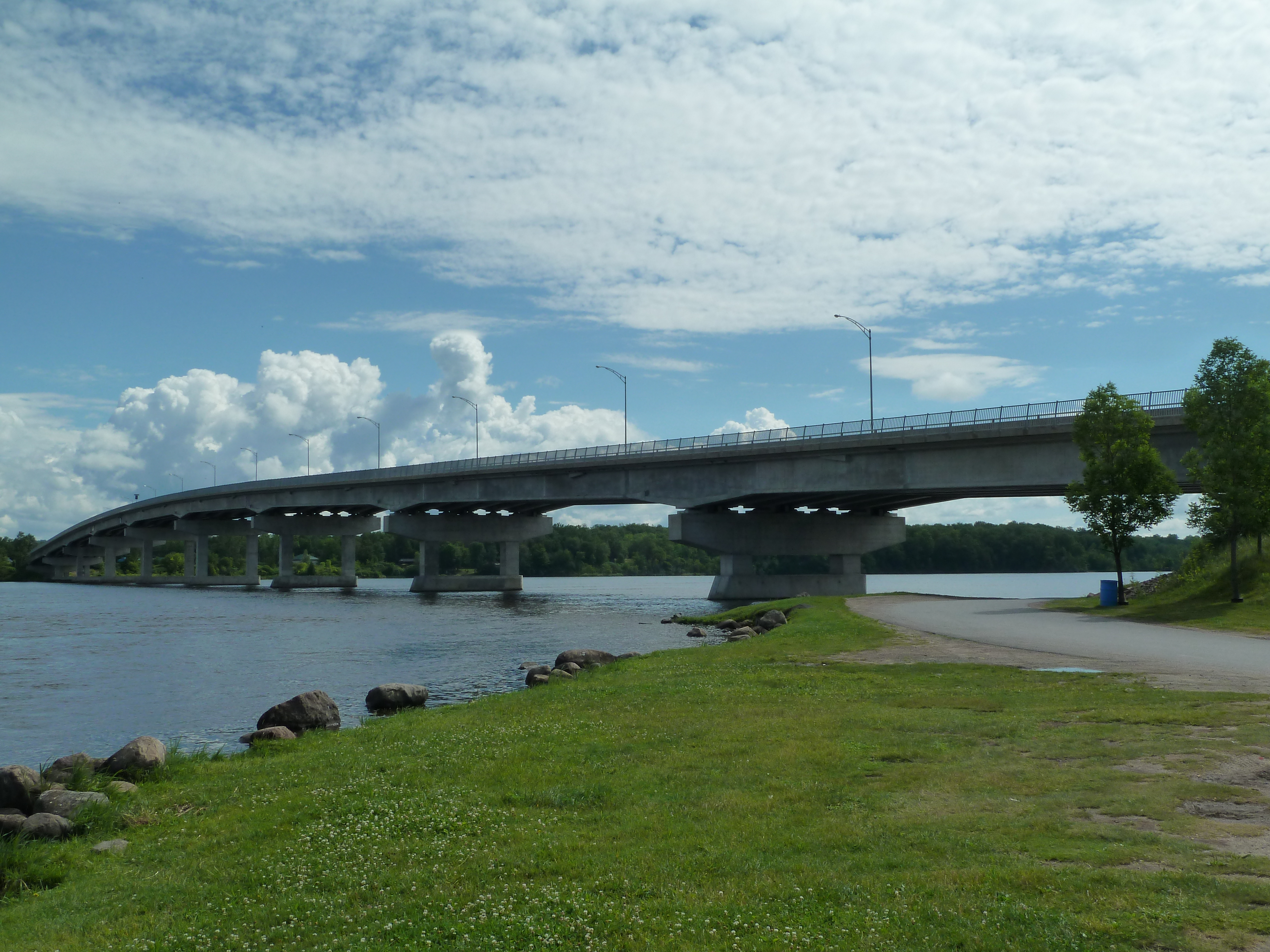
- The Long-Sault Bridge from Chenail Island
- Coordinates: 45°37′6″N 74°35′52″W
- Crosses: Ottawa River
- Locale: Hawkesbury, Ontario, Grenville, Quebec
- Maintained by: Public Works and Government Services Canada

Characteristics
- Design: T-section girder bridge
- Total length: 650 metres (2,130 ft)
- Width: 21.8 metres (72 ft)

History
- Construction end: 1998
- Opened: 1999

The Long-Sault Bridge (French: Pont du Long-Sault) is a bridge connecting Hawkesbury, Ontario and Grenville, Quebec. It crosses the Ottawa River via Chenail Island. It connects Quebec Route 344 and Ontario Highway 34, and is the only fixed crossing of the Ottawa River between Ottawa and Montreal.

The bridge was built and completed in 1998 to replace the original Perley Bridge built in 1931 (and which was demolished in 1999).

== See also ==
- List of crossings of the Ottawa River
- List of bridges in Canada
