= Sainte-Anne-de-Bellevue Canal =

Canal system in Quebec, Canada

Sainte-Anne-de-Bellevue Canal Canal de Sainte-Anne-de-Bellevue
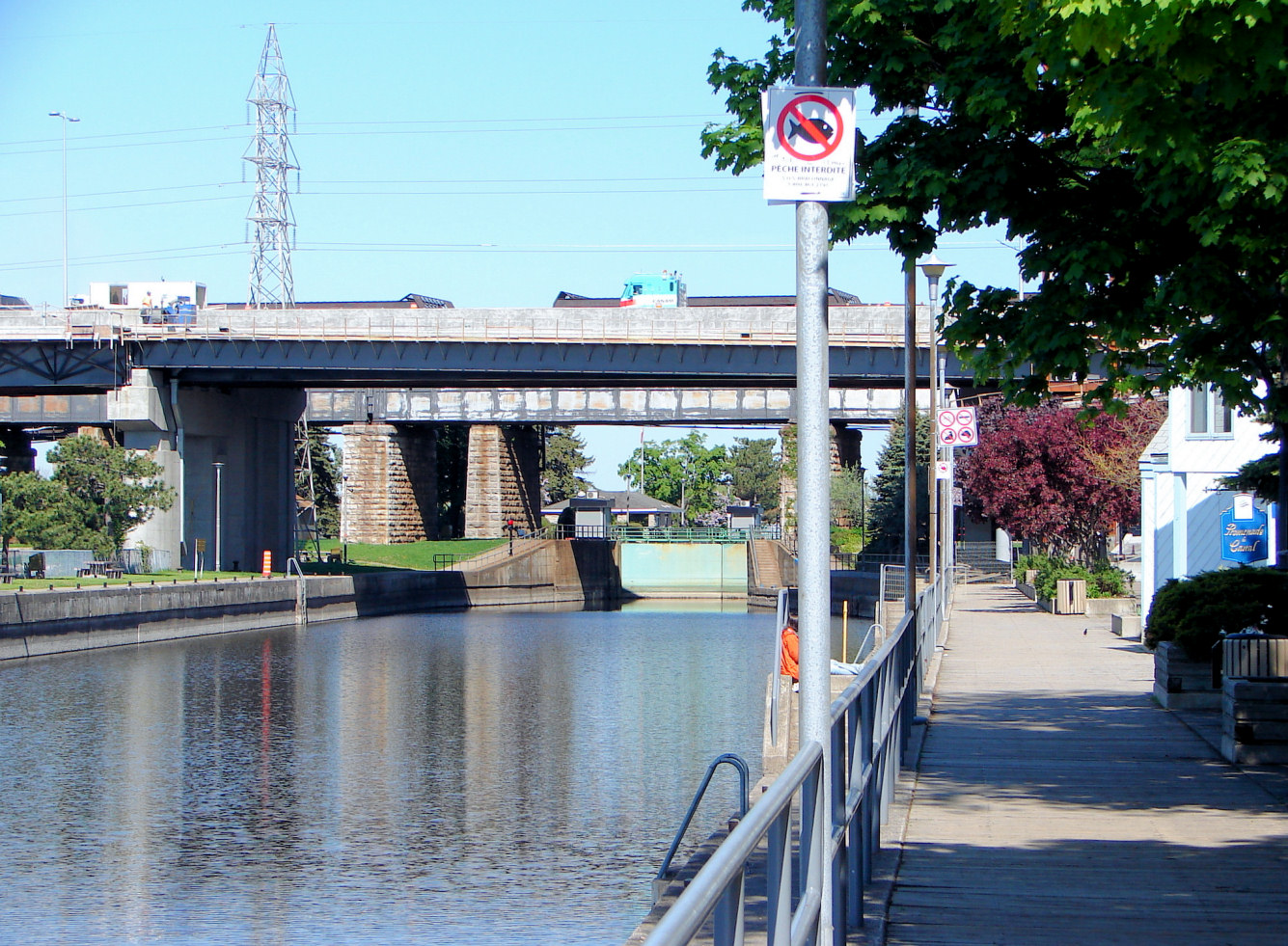
- The Sainte-Anne-de-Bellevue Canal and boardwalk
- Location: Quebec, Canada
- Nearest city: Sainte-Anne-de-Bellevue
- Coordinates: 45°24′13″N 73°57′16″W
- Area: 1.6 hectares (4.0 acres)
- Established: 1972
- Built: 1843
- Visitors: 181,000 (in 2003)
- Governing body: Parks Canada
- Website: Official website

National Historic Site of Canada

The Sainte-Anne-de-Bellevue Canal is a canal and set of locks linking Lake Saint-Louis and Lake of Two Mountains at Sainte-Anne-de-Bellevue, the very westernmost point of Montreal Island, Quebec, Canada. It is a National Historic Site of Canada.

The canal is located in the eastern channel of the Ottawa River around Perrot Island (Île Perrot) where shallow rapids form a natural obstacle. It forms part of the waterway system that allows boating access from the Saint Lawrence River up the Ottawa River to the City of Ottawa, and even to Lake Ontario via the Rideau Canal.

The canal and locks are used today exclusively for recreational boating. The site is a popular tourist location that also offers mooring places, picnic tables, boat launch, and park land. Guided tours and interpretative panels are provided by Parks Canada. Together with the boardwalk and restaurants and cafes that line the canal, the site drew 181,000 visitors and 23,000 boaters in 2003, making it the second busiest canal and locks in Quebec. The dimensions of the lock are 54.86 metres (180.0 ft) long, 12.19 metres (40.0 ft) wide, and 2.74 metres (9.0 ft) deep at the sills. It lifts boats by 1 metre (3.3 ft).

== History ==
Prior to the existence of the Sainte-Anne-de-Bellevue Canal, there had already been since 1816 a canal and lock in the channel on the west side of Perrot Island, facing Dorion. But this canal was privately owned, with its owners therefore having a monopoly over the shipping going upstream. Other merchants, opposing the unfair practice, petitioned the government to build a public lock at Sainte-Anne-de-Bellevue.

The first plans for the canal were drawn up in 1831. But because of financial, administrative, and political setbacks, it would not be until 1840 that construction began on the canal. It was completed on November 14, 1843. The original locks were 58 metres (190 ft) long, 14 metres (46 ft) wide, and 2 metres (6.6 ft) deep at the sills.

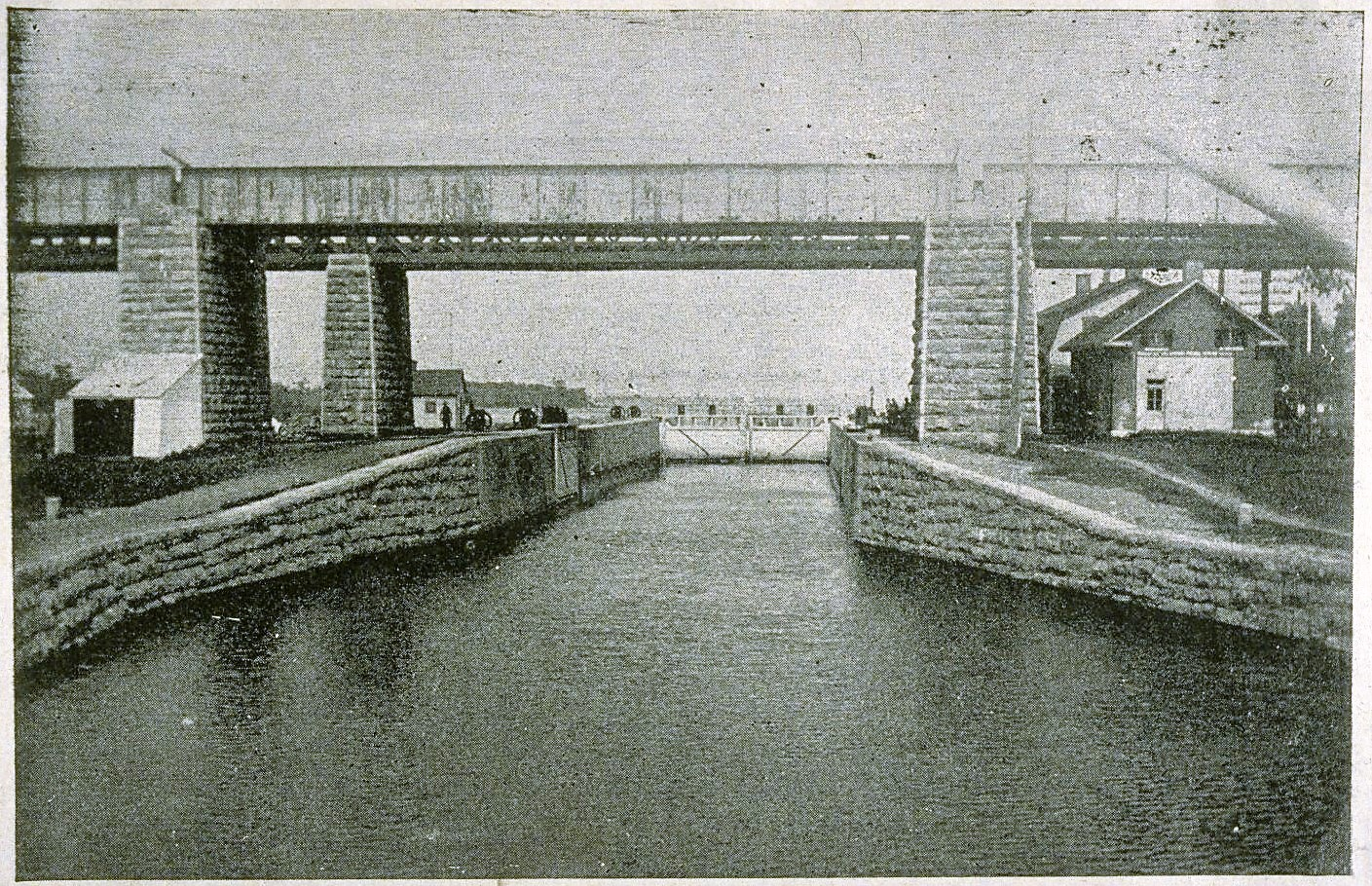
Canal and railroad bridges in 1894

The canal and locks proved to be a major impetus to colonization and commerce. Soon after it opened, it was used by many people travelling upstream to settle in Upper Canada, and it attracted a large amount of commercial traffic. This, as well as the lock's approach that was difficult to navigate, necessitated a second lock. Following the recommendations of the Canals Commission in 1870, a second lock was built directly east and parallel to the first one, with work completed in 1882. The original locks were used less and less until 1909 when they were abandoned.

Since the completion of the second canal, the Sainte-Anne-de-Bellevue Canal and the other canals of the Ottawa River were mainly used to transport wood to Montreal. This commerce flourished until 1919 whereafter the logging industry went into decline. From 1920 to 1963, shipments of sand, gravel and petroleum products became the principal freight transported. In 1914, electric lighting was installed, and in 1923, the gate mechanisms were electrified. But the railroad supplanted water transportation and the canal lost most of its importance. In the 1960s, a period of modernization saw the removal of many old service buildings, such as the toll collector’s residence and office, smithy, carpentry shop, storehouse, and tool shed. The lock’s old wooden gates were replaced with steel ones and in 1964, the old 1843 canal and locks were completely backfilled.

In 1972, the canal, locks, and banks were designated a National Historic Site and came under the jurisdiction of Parks Canada. Because of the canal's transportation and historic roles, it is managed in accordance with the Department of Transport Act and the Historic Sites and Monuments Act.

== See also ==
- Carillon Canal, canal on the Ottawa River, also a National Historic Site
- Grenville Canal, historic canal on the Ottawa River
