= Carillon Canal =

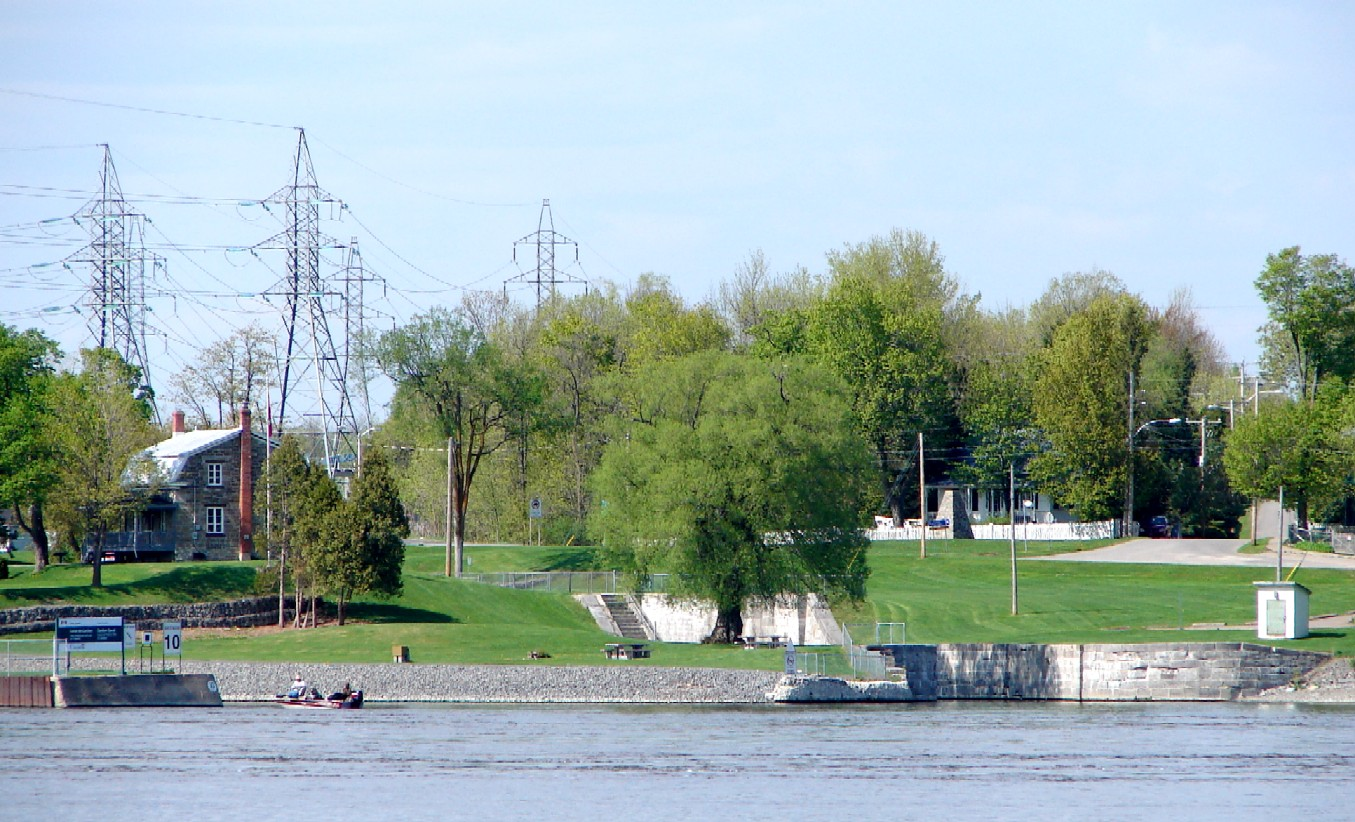
- Downstream entrance of the original Carillon Canal
- Interactive map of Carillon Canal
- 45°34′02″N 74°22′45″W
- Location: Quebec, Canada
- Nearest city: Saint-André-d'Argenteuil

History
- Built: 1830

Site notes
- Governing body: Parks Canada
- Website: Official website

National Historic Site of Canada

The Carillon Canal is a National Historic Site of Canada in Saint-André-d'Argenteuil, Quebec. It preserves the historic Carillon Canal that was first built in the 1830s to facilitate travel on the Ottawa River. It is a prominent heritage site and recreation area, visited annually by 20,000 pleasure boaters and 30,000 people who use its riverside park.

In addition to the original canal itself, other items of historical interest are:

- the remains of lock No. 1, built between 1830 and 1833
- the superintendent's and toll collector's houses
- the jetty of the second canal built between 1873 and 1882
- the Carillon Barracks, currently housing the Regional Argenteuil Museum.

== History ==
Together with the Grenville Canal and the Chute-à-Blondeau Canal, the Carillon Canal was built to navigate the Long Sault Rapids on the Ottawa River which stretched for 21 kilometers (13 mi) from Carillon to Grenville. The impetus for these canals was the War of 1812. During this war, attacks along the Saint Lawrence River jeopardized the communication lines between Kingston and Montreal, the two main military positions of Upper and Lower Canada. The Ottawa River Canals and the Rideau Canal were thus designed as an alternative military supply route in the event of war with the Americans.

Work began first on the Grenville Canal in 1818. In 1819, Captain Henry Vernet of the Royal Corps of Engineering arrived from Britain to lead the construction of the project. Hundreds of Irish immigrants and French Canadians excavated the canal under the direction of a hundred British soldiers. In 1833, the Grenville Canal was completed with an original length of 9.5 kilometers (5.9 mi) and the entire network on the Ottawa River, including the 11 locks, was not fully completed until about 1843.

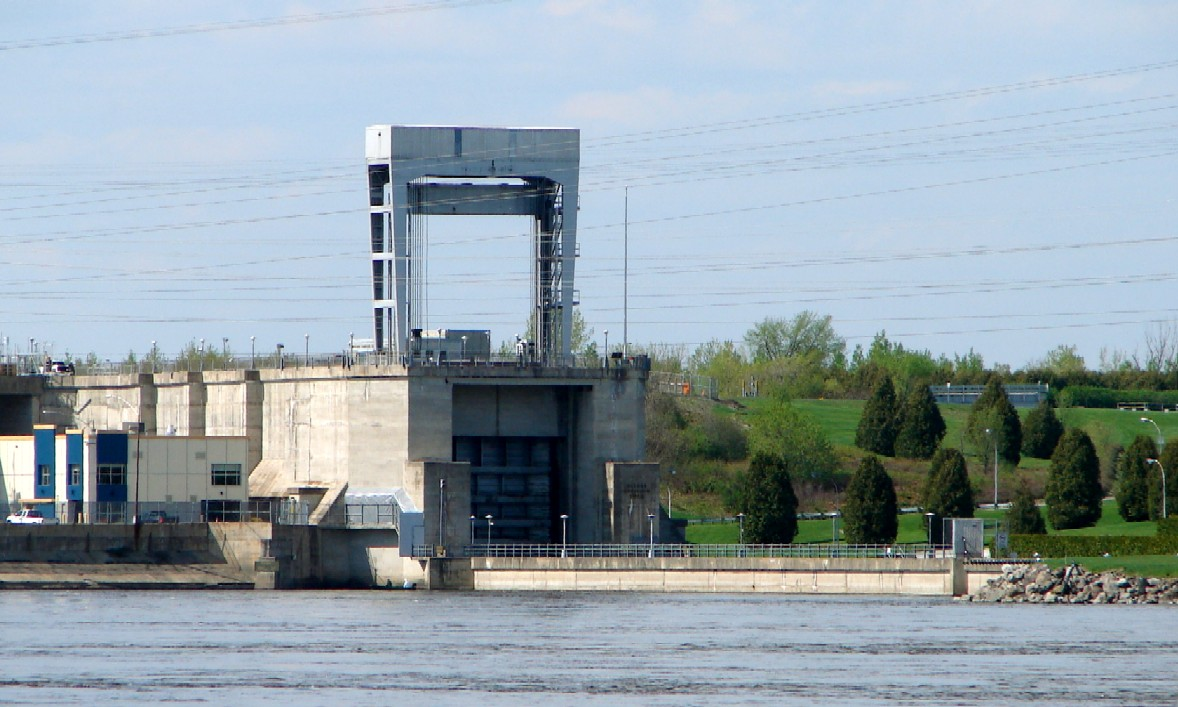
The modern boat lock at Carillon

The military requirements decided all aspects of the canal. The size of the locks were set to 134 feet (41 m) long, 33 feet (10 m) wide, and only 5 feet (1.5 m) deep at the thresholds. These dimensions, standards adopted for military use, were insufficient for any commercial use. Forestry had become the main economic activity in this region, and from 1867, local business people demanded that the government carry out improvements to the network because the original canal network had become outdated. In 1870, the Canals Commission recommended making the Ottawa River deeper between Lachine and Ottawa. Therefore, between 1873 and 1882, the Grenville and Carillon Canals were enlarged (the dam built upstream from the village of Carillon raised the level of the Ottawa River at Chute-à-Blondeau, making the need for a canal and lock there no longer necessary).

The canal was designated a National Historic Site in 1929.

Further changes were made from 1959 to 1963 with the construction of the Carillon hydroelectric dam and a modern 20 meters (66 ft) high lock at Carillon. This work substantially and irreversibly changed the canal network. The dam raised the water level by over 62 feet (19 m) at Carillon and over 9 feet (2.7 m) at Grenville. The new water level flooded the rapids of Long-Sault, transforming them into calm water.

== See also ==
- Sainte-Anne-de-Bellevue Canal - a canal further downstream, also a National Historic Site
