= Marshall Steel =

Canadian structural steel company

Marshall Steel Company Limited
- Logo design by W.A. Marshall
- Type: Private (1960–1983); publicly traded (1983–1992)
- Industry: Structural steel fabrication, erection, and distribution
- Founded: 1960
- Founder: Clarence W. Marshall
- Fate: Control acquired by Canadian Erectors Ltd. (1992)
- Headquarters: Chomedey, Laval, Quebec; Ottawa, Ontario; later Milton, Ontario, Canada
- Key people: Clarence W. Marshall (founder); W. A. "Wels" Marshall; C. D. "Ken" Marshall; Jeffrey G. Marshall
- Products: Structural steel fabrication, erection, and metal distribution

Marshall Steel Company Limited (French: Acier Marshall Compagnie Limitée) was a Canadian structural steel fabrication, erection, and distribution company based in Quebec and Ontario. The company was founded by Clarence W. Marshall and subsequently led by two generations of the Marshall family; his sons W. A. "Wels" Marshall and C. D. "Ken" Marshall, and later Wels' son, Jeffrey G. Marshall. In 1981, the company acquired a majority interest in the century-old public distributor Drummond McCall Inc., briefly operating as Marshall Drummond McCall Inc. in the mid-1980s, before divesting the Drummond McCall operations and continuing as an independent structural-steel fabricator until family control ended in 1992.

== Background ==
Clarence W. Marshall founded Dominion Reinforcing Steel Co. Ltd. in Ottawa in 1914. By 1930, the company had expanded into the structural-steel business and was incorporated as Dominion Structural Steel Limited (DSS). Marshall was its chief executive and chairman, and his sons W. A. and C. D. Marshall were executives and sat on its board. A longstanding leader in the Canadian steel sector, Clarence Marshall was elected president of the Canadian Institute of Steel Construction (CISC) in 1945.

In July 1954, Canada Iron Foundries Ltd. offered to purchase the outstanding common shares of DSS for $42 per share, a transaction valued at approximately $4.2 million. DSS’ board recommended the offer for acceptance and by early August 1954 more than 85 percent of DSS's shares had been tendered and acquired by Canada Iron. Operating within the new constellation of companies, DSS expanded nationally with increasingly large industrial projects. In 1958, Wels Marshall was named president of DSS and Ken Marshall its vice-president. That year, working jointly with Dominion Bridge, DSS won the structural-steel contract for the first phase of Place Ville Marie in Montreal, then the largest commercial structural-steel contract ever awarded in Canada (reported at approximately $9 million). Meanwhile, Canada Iron continued to expand its network, bringing three further regional fabricators into the group: Western Bridge & Steel Fabricators of Vancouver, C. W. Carry Ltd. of Edmonton, and Calgary Structural Steel Ltd.

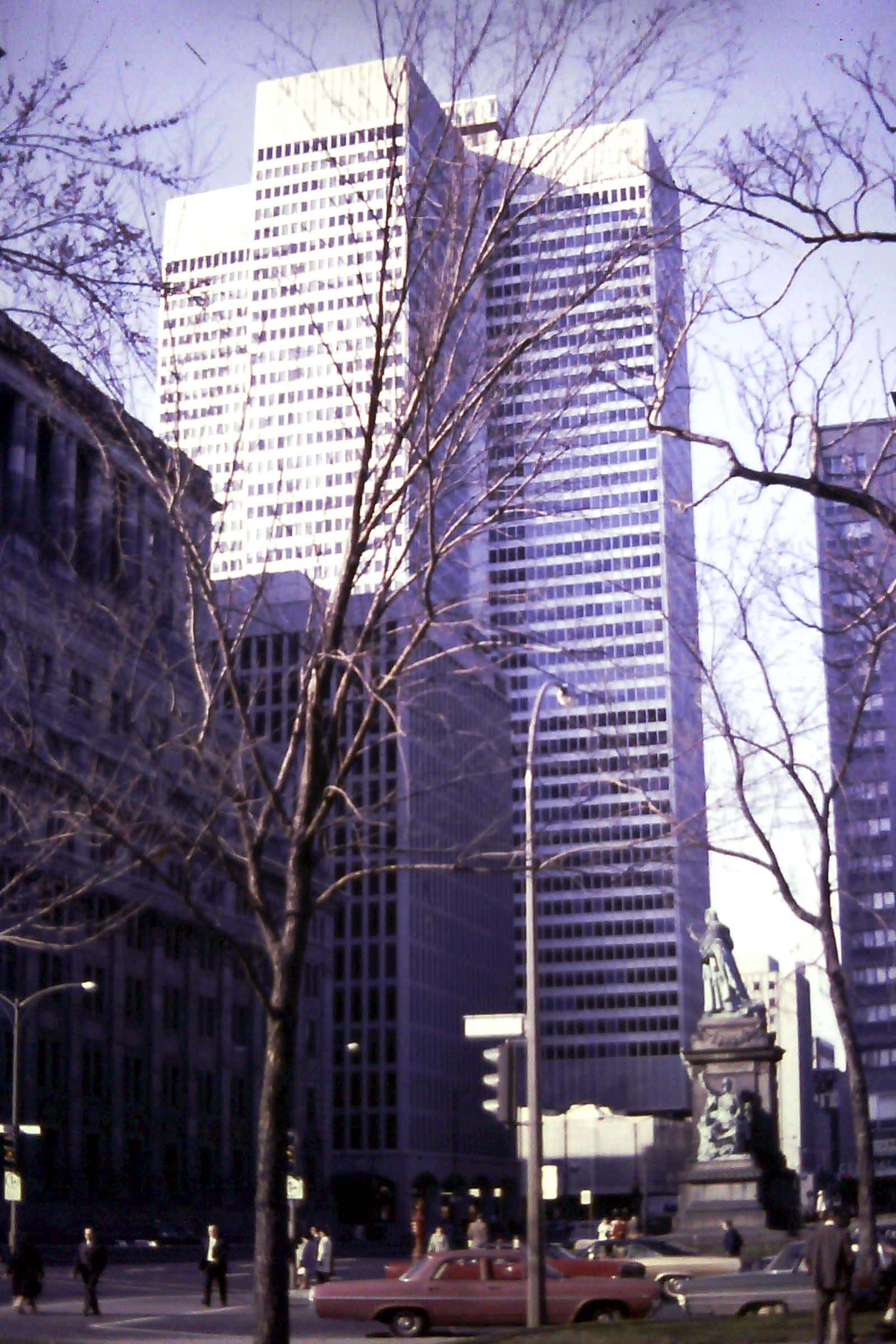
Place Ville Marie in 1967. Montreal, Quebec, Canada.

But in 1959, the DSS structural-steel division reported a loss. In his report to shareholders Canada Iron's president, T. F. Rahilly, attributed the shortfall to under-bidding on structural-steel projects in a highly competitive market, compounded by the cost of developing new product lines including industrial cranes, roof decks, and wall panels. Rahilly's letter to shareholders stated that a shakeup of DSS's top-level personnel was underway. On 26 May 1960, E. L. Hartley, previously associated with the recently acquired Western Bridge, was elected president of DSS at its annual meeting. The Marshalls effectively left the company they had founded and operated for thirty years.

Canada Iron announcement of DSS executives after acquisition. From left: Clarence W. Marshall, W. A. "Wels" Marshall, C. D. "Ken" Marshall, and W. D. Moncur. Source: Globe and Mail, Sept.7, 1954

== History ==
=== Founding (1960–1966) ===
Clarence W. Marshall formed Marshall Steel Company Limited in Ottawa and Montreal in 1960. By 1961 the company’s structural-steel fabricating plant was established in the newly created city of Chomedey, north of Montreal. Marshall was chairman of the company's board when he died in Ottawa on 27 March 1966.

=== Growth and diversification (1966–1980) ===
Following Clarence's death, the company passed to his sons, Wels and Ken Marshall. During the next decade the brothers developed the company into an integrated structural-steel business combining fabrication, erection, and metal processing and distribution, operating from plants in Montreal and Toronto.

By the end of the decade, the company had eliminated its long-term debt and exceeded its target return of 20 percent on shareholders' equity for five consecutive years.

Jeffrey G. Marshall, son of Wels, did consecutive degrees (engineering at Queen's University and MBA at McGill) and joined the company in 1964. He rose through its management to become president in 1978. In June 1980, he became the youngest chairman in the history of the Canadian Institute of Steel Construction, a position his grandfather Clarence had held in 1945.

Jeffrey G. Marshall speaking as outgoing Chairman of CISC

=== International expansion (1977–1980) ===
Declines in domestic construction in Canada in the late 1970s pushed the Canadian structural-steel industry toward export markets. As recently as 1977, Bermuda was Marshall Steel's only foreign market. By 1979, helped by a depreciated Canadian dollar, upgraded plant efficiency, and federal assistance, the company had expanded into Trinidad, the Ivory Coast, Indonesia, Ecuador, Argentina, Bangladesh, Cuba, and the United States.

In 1979, the company’s joint venture with Frankel Steel Ltd. of Toronto for a steel mill in Trinidad was held up by the national press as a sign of opportunity for the hurting sector. The mill as a whole was valued at approximately US$375 million, with about 245 workers, 55 of them Canadian, engaged in its construction.

=== Acquisition of Drummond McCall (1981–1982) ===
Drummond McCall Inc. was a publicly traded Canadian metal distributor founded in Montreal in 1881 with operations across nine provinces and the northeastern United States. Headquartered in Lachine, Quebec, its annual sales and total assets were roughly three and a half to four times the size of Marshall Steel. In December 1979, Drummond McCall's management had approached Marshall about a possible merger. Marshall signaled interest in a share exchange rather than a cash transaction, and the discussions ended without a deal. Two years later, in 1981, Marshall Steel launched a hostile bid for a controlling interest in Drummond McCall. The acquisition was primarily financed through a floating-rate loan from the Toronto-Dominion Bank. In planning the acquisition, the company had assumed an average interest rate of approximately 14 percent through 1985. But by August 1981, Canadian bank prime had reached 21 percent, putting the cost of the loan at nearly 22 percent.

The initial public bid was $15 a share for 51 percent of Drummond McCall's 3.5 million shares, a transaction valued at approximately $27 million. Drummond's board and management opposed the offer, triggering a legal fight across two securities commissions and the Quebec courts.

On 9 October 1981, the Ontario and Quebec securities commissions sat jointly in Montreal to hear Drummond's objection that Marshall, as a private company, had disclosed no financial information by which shareholders could judge its ability to pay. The commissions, with Ontario Securities Commission chairman Henry Knowles present and the ruling delivered by Quebec vice-chairman Roland Côté, imposed a nine-day delay, requiring Marshall to halt purchases until 23 October and mail shareholders fresh information on its financing. Marshall’s attorneys complied and the hostile bidding process was allowed to proceed.

The first offer closed on 23 October with 39.24 percent of shares tendered (1,378,645 shares), short of the fixed 51 percent Marshall required. Marshall announced a renewed offer at the same price on 26 October, but four days later Mr. Justice Kenneth Mackay of the Quebec Superior Court granted an interim injunction returning the tendered shares, once again suspending the bidding. A same-day appeal to Mr. Justice Rodolphe Paré of the Quebec Court of Appeal was declined on jurisdictional grounds. Marshall separately obtained a court order compelling Royal Trust to produce a current shareholders' list it had twice refused to provide.

Marshall relaunched the offer with a minimum of 45 percent and a maximum of 51 percent, at the same $15 price. It closed on 24 November 1981 with approximately 95 percent of Drummond McCall's shares tendered. Marshall took 51 percent and gained control of Drummond McCall, with its roughly $223 million in annual sales that ranked it as Canada's 241st-largest company at the time. By contrast, Marshall Steel's own sales were expected to reach approximately $70 million that year. Derek A. Drummond became chairman of the combined board, with five existing directors remaining, and Jeffrey Marshall took over as president of Drummond McCall in place of D. T. Bourke.

But Marshall had acquired a company that was under significant financial duress. Drummond McCall's 1981 annual report described the year as one of the most dramatic and demanding periods in its corporate history; annual sales rose from about $223.5 million to $274.7 million while earnings fell from about $3.9 million to $430,000, with a fourth-quarter loss of approximately $1.7 million.

=== Recession and restructuring (1982–1983) ===
The 1982 Canadian metals-industry recession battered the combined companies' financial results. Drummond McCall's 1982 sales fell approximately 27 percent to about $200 million, with a net loss of approximately $10.7 million. Jeffrey Marshall described the market that year as showing "one hell of a lot of distress sales."

Canadian structural steel fabricators were also facing growing restrictions in the United States. Under Buy America legislation, Canadian steel was increasingly excluded from federally funded bridge and highway projects. A 1987 Canadian government study found that these restrictions had virtually eliminated Canadian fabricators from the American bridge construction market.

Marshall’s management responded with a restructuring program in which warehouse space was reduced from approximately 1.4 million to 900,000 square feet, inventory was cut about 36 percent, and short-term bank debt was cut roughly 64 percent. By late 1983 Jeffrey Marshall told reporters that the business had significantly improved.

In late 1983, Drummond McCall acquired Marshall Steel's operating assets in exchange for shares, raising Marshall's ownership stake to approximately 60 percent. The combined company later took the name Marshall Drummond McCall Inc.

=== Marshall Drummond McCall Inc. and divestiture (1987–1988) ===
The acquisition of Drummond McCall had not produced the benefits Marshall Steel had expected, while the debt taken on to finance the takeover had drained the well-performing parent company during critical years. The Financial Post later attributed the company's difficulties partly to the poor timing of the 1981 acquisition and the different corporate cultures of the two businesses.

In February 1987, shareholders approved the sale of Drummond McCall's metal distribution operations to Federal Industries Ltd. of Winnipeg for approximately $110 million. The sale eliminated the company's debt, and its name reverted to Marshall Steel Limited. The company returned to its original business of structural steel fabrication and erection.

=== Renewed expansion (1988–1991) ===
Within fifteen months, Marshall Steel had resumed its aggressive expansion with new facilities and new outlets. In 1988 the company purchased the former Frankel Steel fabricating plant in Milton, Ontario, for $6.8 million, selling its smaller Mississauga site for $5.9 million, and opened new United States distribution centers in Atlanta and Palmer, Massachusetts. The company reported 1987 operating profit of $2.7 million (lifted to $15.3 million including a $12.6 million gain on the Drummond McCall sale), and projected 1988 sales of approximately $150 million against $104.5 million the previous year. Contracts from this period included a $24 million structural-steel contract for General Motors of Canada's paint shop at Sainte-Thérèse, Quebec, completed in 1988.

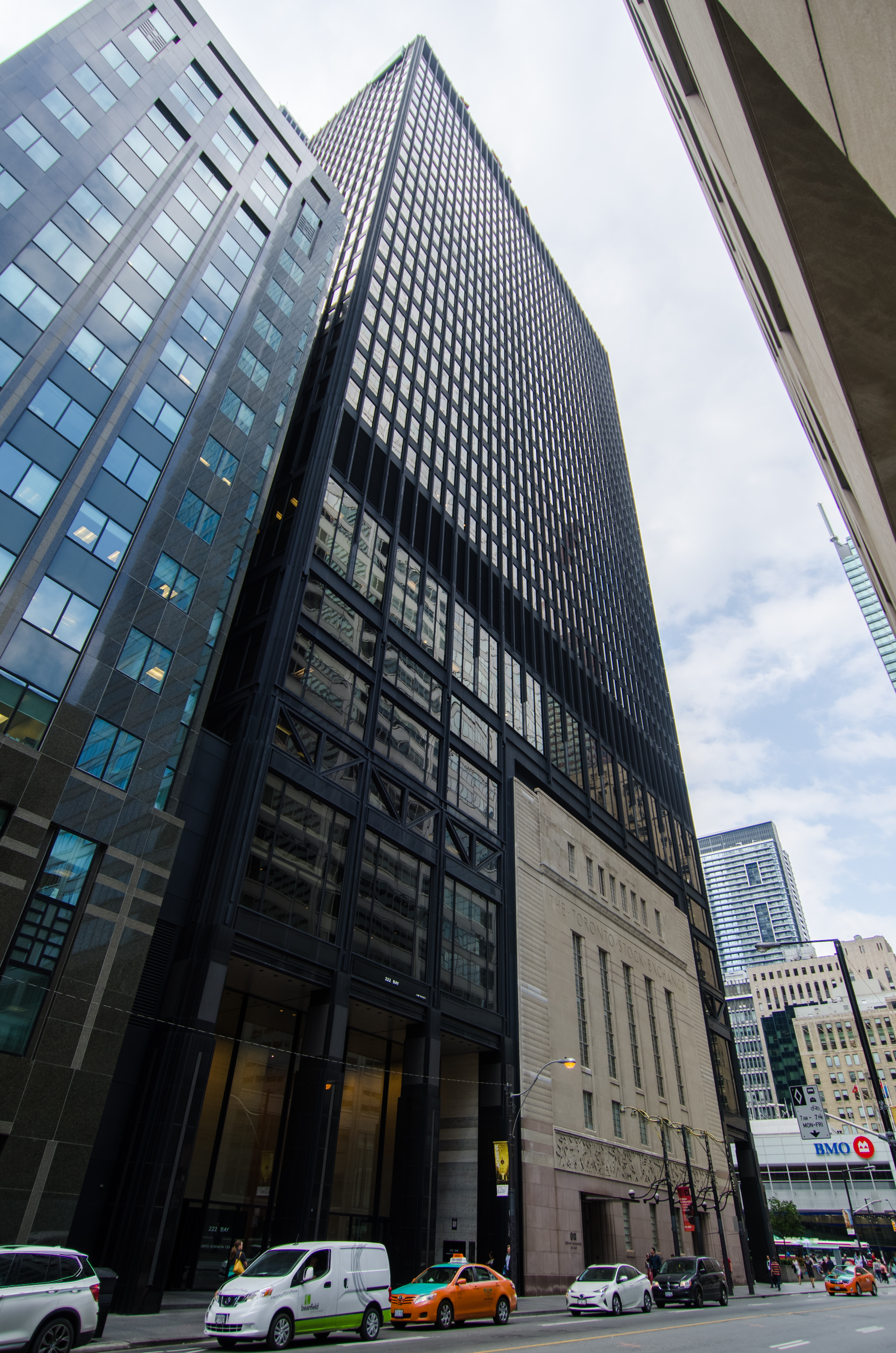
The former Toronto Stock Exchange building, preserved at the base of the TD5 tower within the Toronto-Dominion Centre.

=== Sale and end of family ownership (1992) ===
In 1990 Jeffrey Marshall warned that the high Canadian dollar had once again effectively closed the U.S. market to Canadian structural-steel fabricators, and that high interest rates and a construction slump would bring a severe recession to the industry. Despite winning two of the biggest projects in the Toronto core — the TD 5 building and CBC Broadcast Center — Marshall Steel ended 1991 with a loss. In early April 1992 the Toronto-Dominion Bank seized the Marshall family's 62 percent stake after the family holding company, Marshall DMC Holdings Inc., defaulted on a loan. In May the bank sold the control block for $6.5 million to CEL Marshares Inc., a subsidiary of competitor Canadian Erectors Ltd run by Cecil Hawkins. Wels and Ken Marshall resigned as directors, and Jeffrey Marshall, the company's president and majority shareholder, was terminated (effective immediately).

== Aftermath ==
In 1994 Wels and Ken Marshall sued the company to recover retirement benefits, and Jeffrey Marshall sued for wrongful dismissal and lost retirement benefits. The company stated it contested the claims. Any settlements were never reported publicly.
