= Hawkesbury, Ontario =

Town in Ontario, Canada

Hawkesbury
- Town (lower-tier)
- Town of Hawkesbury / Ville de Hawkesbury (French)
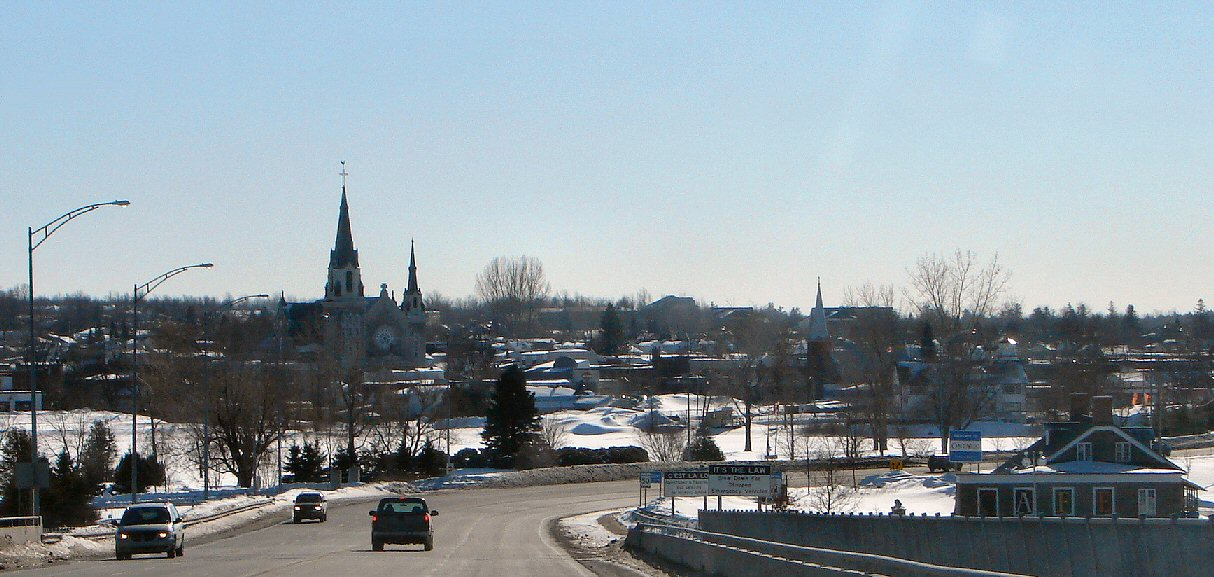
- Skyline of Hawkesbury as seen from the Long-Sault Bridge

- Coat of arms
- Motto(s): "Vaillant et Veillant" (French) "Valiant and Vigilant"
- Location within United Counties of Prescott and Russell Location within Southern Ontario
- Coordinates: 45°36′30″N 74°36′06″W
- Country: Canada
- Province: Ontario
- County: United Counties of Prescott and Russell
- Established: 1859

Government
  - Type: Town
  - Mayor: Robert Lefebvre
  - Governing Body: Hawkesbury Town Council
  - MP: Giovanna Mingarelli (LP)
  - MPP: Stéphane Sarrazin (PCO)

Area
  - Total: 10.10 km^{2} (3.90 sq mi)
- Elevation: 33 m (108 ft)

Population (2021)
  - Total: 10,194
  - Density: 1,009.7/km^{2} (2,615/sq mi)
- Time zone: UTC-5 (EST)
  - Summer (DST): UTC-4 (EDT)
- Postal code: K6A
- Area code: 613
- Website: www.hawkesbury.ca

Hawkesbury is a town along the Ottawa River in the United Counties of Prescott and Russell in Eastern Ontario, Canada. Hawkesbury is the third most bilingual town in Ontario, with about 70% of its inhabitants being fluent in English and French. Franco-Ontarians make up 89% of the population.

The Long-Sault Bridge links it to Grenville, Quebec, to the north. This bridge, crossing Chenail Island, is the only interprovincial bridge between Ontario and Quebec east of Ottawa. The town is located 95 kilometres (59 mi) east from Ottawa, and is considered to be midway between Ottawa and Montreal.

== History ==
Founded in 1798, Hawkesbury was named after the Right Honourable Charles Jenkinson, Baron Hawkesbury.

Thomas Mears and David Pattee, two Americans, entered into a partnership in 1805, in order to harness the power of the lower Ottawa River and built the first sawmill on the Upper Canada side of the river. The town of Hawkesbury developed around this mill. Mears also built the Union, the Ottawa River's first steamer. Demand for timber during the Napoleonic Wars created a boom. The mill complex continued to grow for at least the next half century, and by 1870 it included 145 different saws and created over 35 million board feet of lumber per year.

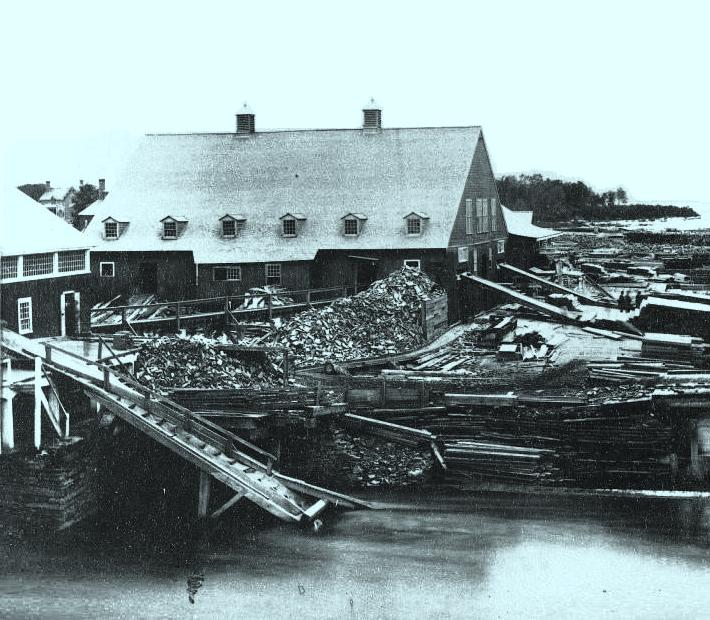
Hamilton Sawmill, Hawkesbury, around 1859.

Timber and pulp-and-paper industries have been supplanted by textiles, synthetic fibres, metal extrusions, steel, glass and plastics. Hawkesbury has also become the business and service centre of the United Counties of Prescott and Russell. The Grenville Canal on the Quebec side of the Ottawa River opposite Hawkesbury was an important link in the river's transportation system.

Part of Hawkesbury was submerged by the Carillon Hydro-Québec dam built between 1950 and 1962, which called for the demolition of over 300 houses in and around Hawkesbury. New developments today are happening due to baby boomers from Ottawa, Montreal and area purchasing some of the many new condos in town.

== Demographics ==
In the 2021 Census of Population conducted by Statistics Canada, Hawkesbury had a population of 10,194 living in 5,080 of its 5,308 total private dwellings, a change of −0.7% from its 2016 population of 10,263. With a land area of 10.1 km^{2} (3.9 sq mi), it had a population density of 1,009.3/km^{2} (2,614.1/sq mi) in 2021.

Canada census – Hawkesbury community profile

	2021	2016	2011
Population	10,194 (-0.7% from 2016)	10,263 (-2.7% from 2011)	10,551 (-2.9% from 2006)
Land area	10.10 km^{2} (3.90 sq mi)	9.62 km^{2} (3.71 sq mi)	9.46 km^{2} (3.65 sq mi)
Population density	1,009.7/km^{2} (2,615/sq mi)	1,067.3/km^{2} (2,764/sq mi)	1,115.6/km^{2} (2,889/sq mi)
Median age	54.8 (M: 52.8, F: 56.4)	52.5 (M: 50.8, F: 53.9)	49.2 (M: 47.6, F: 50.9)
Private dwellings	5,308 (total) 5,080 (occupied)	5,231 (total)	5,256 (total)
Median household income	$53,200	$42,001	$39,981

References: 2021 2016 2011

Historical census populations – Hawkesbury, Ontario

Year	Pop.	±%
1841	250	—
1871	1,671	+568.4%
1881	1,920	+14.9%
1891	2,042	+6.4%
1901	4,150	+103.2%
1911	4,400	+6.0%
1921	5,544	+26.0%
1931	5,177	−6.6%

Year	Pop.	±%
1941	6,263	+21.0%
1951	7,194	+14.9%
1956	7,929	+10.2%
1961	8,661	+9.2%
1966	9,188	+6.1%
1971	9,276	+1.0%
1976	9,789	+5.5%
1981	9,877	+0.9%

Year	Pop.	±%
1986	9,710	−1.7%
1991	9,706	−0.0%
1996	10,162	+4.7%
2001	10,314	+1.5%
2006	10,869	+5.4%
2011	10,551	−2.9%
2016	10,263	−2.7%
2021	10,194	−0.7%

Population counts are not adjusted for boundary changes.
Source: Statistics Canada

=== Languages ===
The 2006 census found that French was the native language of 77% of the population, while English was the mother tongue of 16%. A very high percentage (2.7%) claim both French and English as their mother tongues. In 2006, this was the highest proportion in Canada.

According to the 2011 census, the percentage of the population declaring solely French as a mother tongue grew to 78.6% while the proportion of the population declaring solely English as a mother tongue declined to 15.3%. The percentage claiming both French and English as their mother tongues declined below 2.00% by 2011.

Mother tongue (2021)	Population	Percentage
French	7,240	72.4%
English	1,895	18.9%
English and French	365	3.6%
Non-official languages	425	4.2%

=== Ethnocultural ancestries ===
In parallel to the responses to the census question about ethnocultural ancestries, which are shown below, 1.0% of the population also reported having an Aboriginal identity, while 3.1% reported having a visible minority status (including 2.0% who identified as South Asian).

Single responses: 42.4% of respondents gave a single response of 'Canadian', while a further 25.3% identified with both 'Canadian', and one or more other ancestries. 13.4% of respondents gave a single response of French, 1.9% gave a single response of Irish, 1.9% gave a single response of English and 1.1% gave a single response of North American Indian.

Multiple responses: Counting both single and multiple responses, the most commonly identified ethnocultural ancestries were:

Canadian	67.8%
French	38.7%
English	7.9%

Irish	6.7%
Scottish	4.8%
North American Indian	3.3%

German	1.7%
Italian	1.3%
Greek	1.0%

Percentages are calculated as a proportion of the total number of respondents and may total more than 100% due to dual responses.
All ethnocultural ancestries of more than 1% are listed in the table above according to the exact terminology used by Statistics Canada.

== Culture ==
=== Hockey ===
The community of Hawkesbury has a strong hockey culture. The town's arena bears the name of Stanley Cup winning coach Bob Hartley, who is from Hawkesbury. Hartley has also won various other championship as a coach; notably the Gagarin Cup (2021, 2026), NLA (2012), Calder Cup (1997) and the President's Cup (1993). He is only one of two head coaches to have won both the Stanley Cup and the Gagarin Cup, joining Mike Keenan following his 2021 championship with Avangard Omsk.

Hawkesbury has been home to the Hawkesbury Hawks Junior hockey team since 1974. Originally founded as a Junior B hockey team in the Eastern Ontario Junior B Hockey League. In 1976, they transitioned to Junior A status upon joining the Central Junior A Hockey League, which later became known as the Central Canada Hockey League.

Various NHL players played for the Hawks, including Stanley Cup champion, Hockey Hall of Fame member and current head coach of the Montreal Canadiens, Martin St. Louis.

== Government ==
=== Provincial ===
Hawkesbury is located within the Glengarry—Prescott—Russell provincial electoral district, which is represented by MPP Stéphane Sarrazin (Progressive Conservative Party of Ontario).

=== Federal ===
Hawkesbury is located within the Prescott-Russell-Cumberland federal electoral district, which is represented by MP Giovanna Mingarelli (Liberal Party of Canada).

== Transportation ==
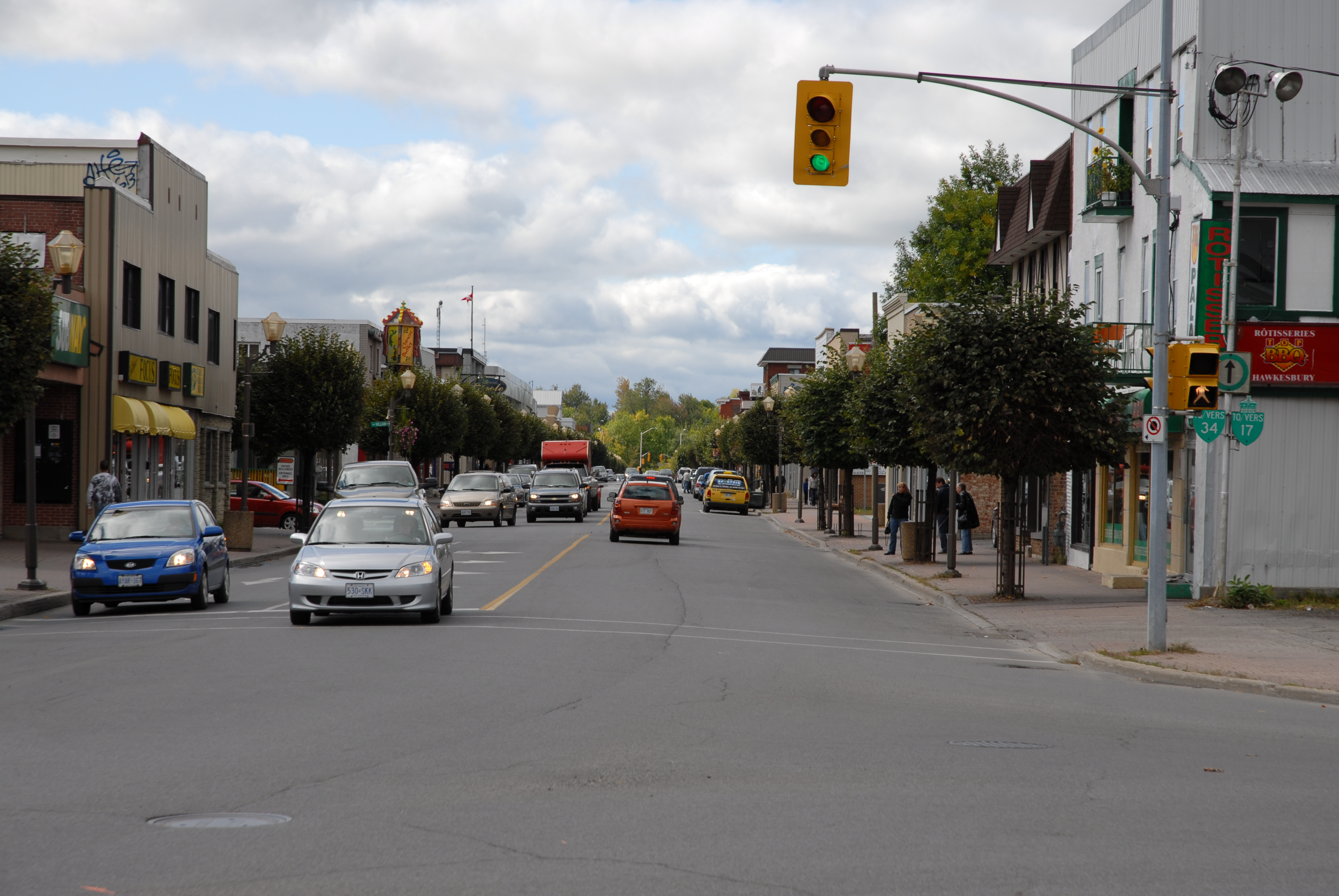
Main Street (Westerly direction)

Hawkesbury is located along Prescott and Russell County Road 17, a former routing of Highway 17 and the Trans-Canada Highway which connects with Highway 417 eastwards to Montreal. Hawkesbury also connects to Highway 417 westward to Ottawa by a 17-kilometre (11 mi) remnant of Highway 34.

The Long-Sault Interprovincial Bridge between Hawkesbury, Ontario, and Grenville, Quebec, means that Hawkesbury is within minutes of Autoroute 50 and Route 148 in Quebec.

The town is served by two small airports:

- Hawkesbury Airport
- Hawkesbury (East) Airport

The closest VIA Rail station with direct service to Ottawa and Montreal is located in Alexandria about 40 km south of Hawkesbury.

== Education ==
Hawkesbury hosts many establishments in the field of education, from elementary schools to colleges and an adult campus.

Elementary Schools:

- Saint-Marguerite Bourgeois (Demolished)
- Paul VI
- Nouvel Horizon

Secondary Schools:

- ESCRH
- Le Sommet

Post-secondary establishments:

- La Cité collégiale
- Contact Nord

Other educational-based establishments:

- Adult Campus of Hawkesbury

== Media ==
Hawkesbury and area are served primarily by local media, media from Montreal and by media from Ottawa. The town does, however, have four radio stations which broadcast at least partially from local studios in Hawkesbury.

=== Newspaper ===
Le Régional is a bilingual independent newspaper that covers the Prescott-Russell region and the municipalities of Grenville and Grenville-sur-la-Rouge in Québec.

Le Carillon, a French-language newspaper, and its bilingual supplement The Tribune Express that cover Hawkesbury and the Prescott-Russell region and are published by the Edition André Paquette Group.

The Review is an English-language weekly newspaper that covers the Glengarry-Prescott-Russell area, which includes Hawkesbury.

=== Radio ===
- FM 88.9 - CIMF-1
- FM 92.1 - CHOD-FM
- FM 102.1 - CHPR
- FM 107.7 - CKHK

=== Television ===
- Channel 39: CHLF-TV-2, TFO
- Channel 48: CICO-TV-96, TVOntario
- Cogeco cable 11: TVCogeco (community channel)

== Notable people ==
- Linda Cardinal, political scientist
- Dominique Demers, writer
- Brian Greenway, guitarist for Canadian rock bands Mashmakhan and April Wine.
- Judith Guichon (1947-), Lieutenant-governor of British Columbia
- Bob Hartley, professional ice hockey head coach, former NHL coach. The municipal arena bears his name.
- Yvan Joly, former NHL player
- Richard Nadeau, Former federal MP of the Bloc Québécois
- Stephen Warren, member of the Wisconsin State Assembly
- Dan McGillis, Former professional ice hockey player, played in the National Hockey League, American Hockey League and the Deutsche Eishockey Liga.

== Popular culture ==
- Hawkesbury is referenced in the 1996 song "I Lost My Baby" by Québécois singer-songwriter Jean LeLoup.

== See also ==
- List of francophone communities in Ontario
