= Grenville, Quebec =

Grenville
- Village municipality
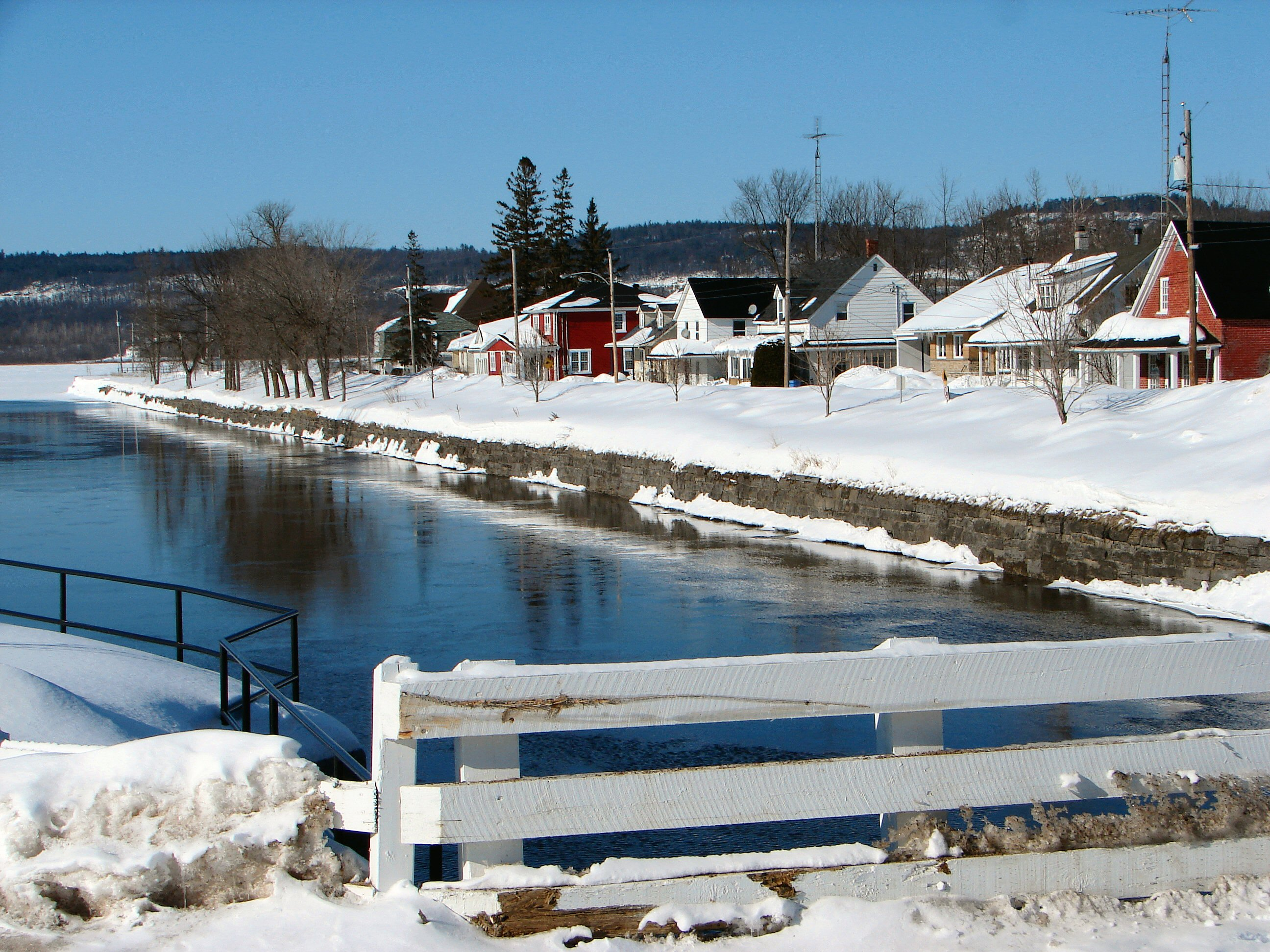

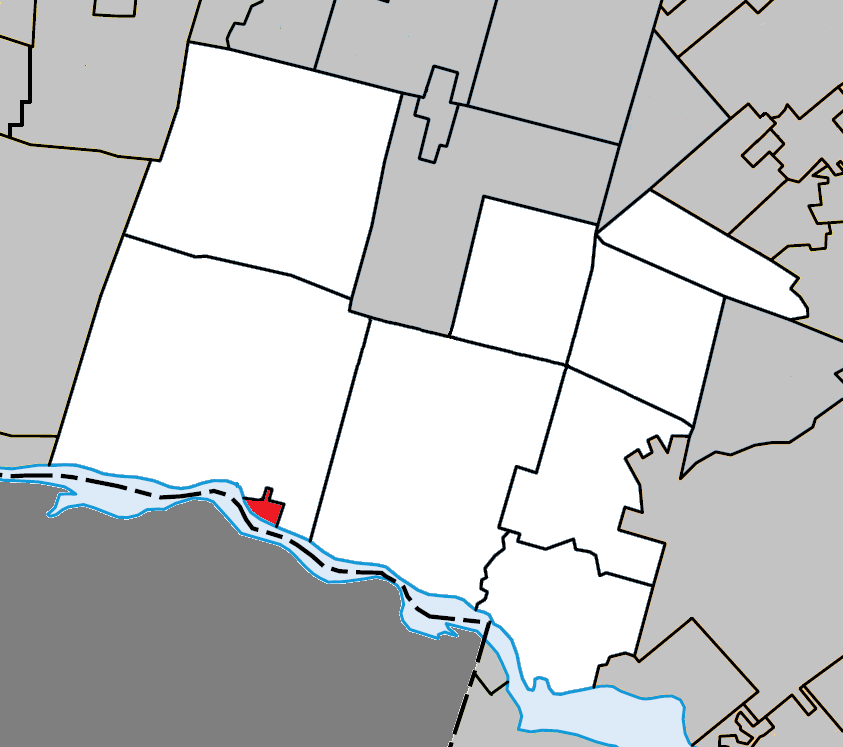
- Location within Argenteuil RCM

- Location in central Quebec
- Coordinates: 45°38′N 74°36′W
- Country: Canada
- Province: Quebec
- Region: Laurentides
- RCM: Argenteuil
- Settled: 1810
- Constituted: January 1, 1876

Government
  - Mayor: Pierre Thauvette
  - Federal riding: Argenteuil—La Petite-Nation
  - Prov. riding: Argenteuil

Area
  - Total: 3.14 km^{2} (1.21 sq mi)
  - Land: 2.82 km^{2} (1.09 sq mi)

Population (2021)
  - Total: 1,816
  - Density: 644.6/km^{2} (1,670/sq mi)
  - Pop 2016-2021: ▲6.1%
  - Dwellings: 951
- Time zone: UTC−5 (EST)
  - Summer (DST): UTC−4 (EDT)
- Postal code(s): J0V 1J0
- Area code: 819
- Highways: R-344
- Website: grenville.ca

Grenville (French pronunciation: [ɡʁɛnvil]) is a village municipality in the Argenteuil Regional County Municipality of the Laurentides region of Quebec, Canada. It is located opposite Hawkesbury, Ontario, on the Ottawa River.

== History ==
Although Grenville was already shown on the Gale and Duberger Map of 1795, it was not until January 28, 1808, that Grenville Township was officially established; the township's name commemorated Lord George Grenville. Two years later, in 1810, the first French and English settlers arrived in the area.

Its strategic location on the Ottawa River and the construction of the Carillon Canal in 1819 led to the town's real growth. In 1826 the first general store opened and in 1828, the first school. In 1830 "Kingsey" sawmill was built, and a flour mill was added in 1838. In 1857 construction began on the Carillon and Grenville Railway, which was completed six years later.

In 1861 the village and its surroundings had about 900 inhabitants. On January 1, 1876, the Village Municipality of Grenville was formed by ceding from the surrounding township.

In 1910 the Carillon and Grenville Railway was abandoned and later on dismantled.

=== Grenville Canal ===
The Grenville Canal, the Chute-à-Blondeau Canal, and the Carillon Canal were built to navigate the Long Sault Rapids on the Ottawa River which stretched for 21 kilometres (13 mi) from Carillon to Grenville. The impetus for these canals was the War of 1812. During this war, attacks along the Saint Lawrence River jeopardized the communication lines between Kingston and Montreal, the two main military positions of Upper and Lower Canada. The Ottawa River Canal and the Rideau Canal were thus designed as an alternative military supply route in the event of war with the Americans.

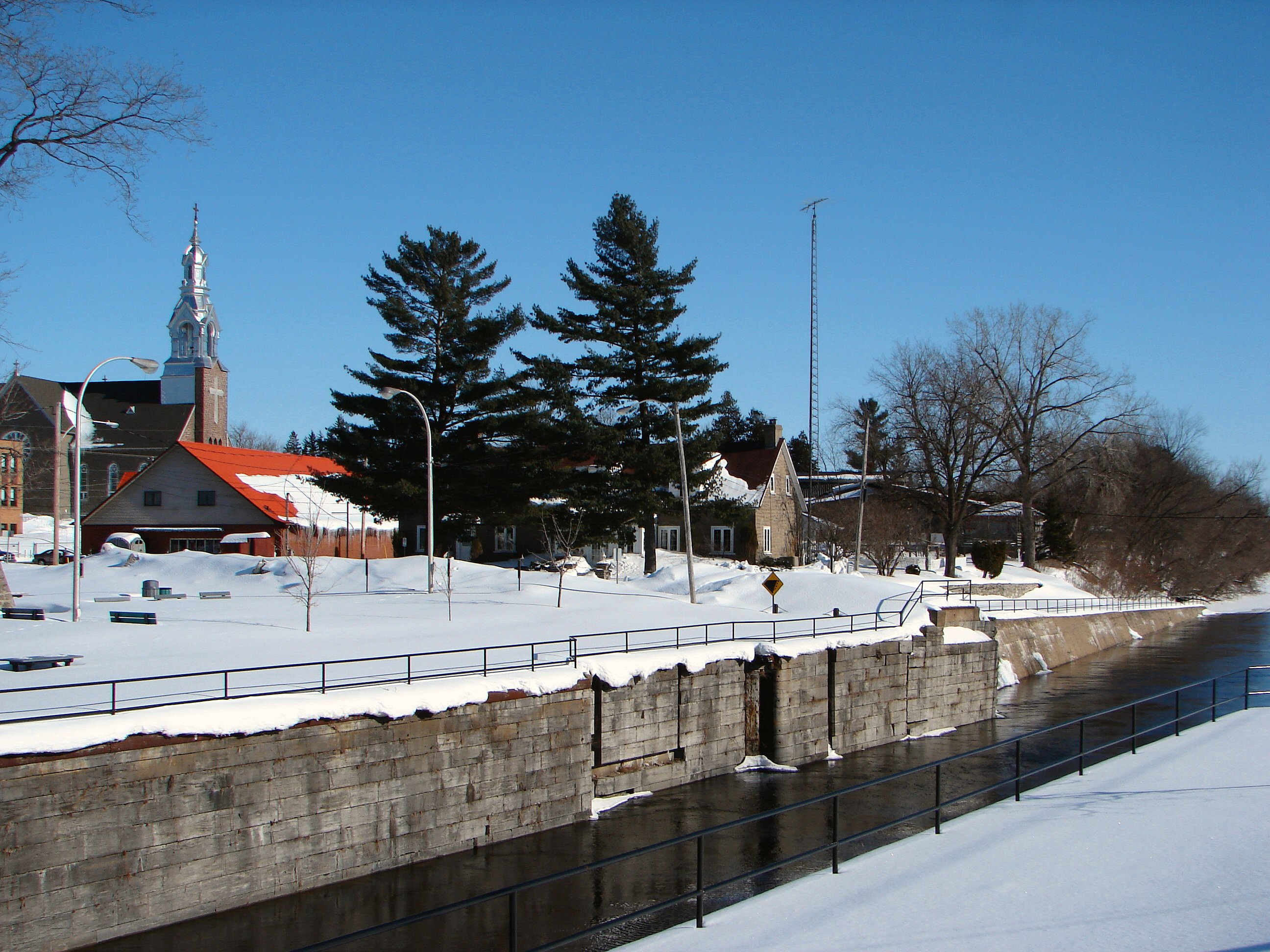
Grenville Canal

Work on the canal began in 1818 with the construction of a storage warehouse. In 1819 Captain Henry Vernet of the Royal Engineers arrived from Britain to lead the construction of the project. Hundreds of Irish immigrants and French Canadians were used to excavate the canal under the direction of a hundred British soldiers. In 1833 the Grenville Canal was completed with an original length of 9.5 kilometres (5.9 mi) and the entire network on the Ottawa River, including the 11 locks, was not fully completed until about 1843.

The military requirements decided all aspects of the canal. The size of the locks were set to 134 feet (41 m) long, 33 feet (10 m) wide, and only 5 feet (1.5 m) deep at the thresholds. These dimensions, standards adopted for military use, were insufficient for any commercial use. Forestry had become the main economic activity in this region, and from 1867, local business people demanded that the government carry out improvements to the network because the original canal network had become outdated. In 1870 the Canals Commission recommended making the Ottawa River deeper between Lachine and Ottawa. Therefore, between 1873 and 1882, the Grenville and Carillon Canals were enlarged (the dam built upstream from the village of Carillon raised the level of the Ottawa River at Chute-à-Blondeau, making the need for a lock there no longer necessary).

Further changes were made from 1959 to 1963 with the construction of the Carillon hydroelectric dam and a modern 20 metres (66 ft) high lock at Carillon. This work substantially and irreversibly changed the canal network. The dam raised the water level by over 62 feet (19 m) at Carillon and over 9 feet (2.7 m) at Grenville. The new water level flooded Greece's Point and its surroundings several feet underwater and inundated the rapids of Long-Sault, transforming them into calm water. Shortly afterwards, the steel swing bridge and canal locks were dismantled.

== Demographics ==
In the 2021 Census of Population conducted by Statistics Canada, Grenville had a population of 1,816 living in 903 of its 951 total private dwellings, a change of 6.1% from its 2016 population of 1,711. With a land area of 2.82 km^{2} (1.09 sq mi), it had a population density of 644.0/km^{2} (1,667.9/sq mi) in 2021.

Canada census – Grenville community profile

	2021	2016	2011
Population	1,816 (+6.1% from 2016)	1,711 (+8.5% from 2011)	1,577 (+12.8% from 2006)
Land area	2.82 km^{2} (1.09 sq mi)	2.87 km^{2} (1.11 sq mi)	2.81 km^{2} (1.08 sq mi)
Population density	644.6/km^{2} (1,670/sq mi)	597.2/km^{2} (1,547/sq mi)	560.4/km^{2} (1,451/sq mi)
Median age	47.2 (M: 46.0, F: 48.8)	42.8 (M: 42.9, F: 42.6)	42.3 (M: 41.3, F: 43.0)
Private dwellings	951 (total) 903 (occupied)	862 (total)	738 (total)
Median household income	$55,200	$44,971	$n/a

References: 2021 2016 2011

Historical census populations – Grenville, Quebec

Year	Pop.	±%
1881	568	—
1891	502	−11.6%
1901	495	−1.4%
1911	633	+27.9%
1921	701	+10.7%
1931	719	+2.6%
1941	737	+2.5%
1951	1,069	+45.0%

Year	Pop.	±%
1956	1,277	+19.5%
1961	1,330	+4.2%
1966	1,501	+12.9%
1971	1,495	−0.4%
1976	1,517	+1.5%
1981	1,417	−6.6%
1986	1,354	−4.4%
1991	1,362	+0.6%

Year	Pop.	±%
1996	1,443	+5.9%
2001	1,315	−8.9%
2006	1,398	+6.3%
2011	1,577	+12.8%
2016	1,711	+8.5%
2021	1,816	+6.1%

Source: Statistics Canada

=== Language ===
Language	Population	Pct (%)
French only	1,510	83.0%
English only	215	11.8%
Both English & French	60	3.3%
Other languages	25	1.4%

== Government ==
List of former mayors:

- Ronald Tittlit (2003–2015)
- Luc Grondin (2015–2019)
- Pierre Thauvette (2019–present)

== Education ==
The Commission scolaire de la Rivière-du-Nord operates French-language public schools.

- École Dansereau/Saint-Martin
- École polyvalente Lavigne in Lachute

The Sir Wilfrid Laurier School Board operates the English-language public schools.

- Grenville Elementary School
- Laurentian Regional High School in Lachute

== Notable people ==
- Marcel Desjardins (1941–2003), journalist, news editor and director

== See also ==
- List of anglophone communities in Quebec
- List of village municipalities in Quebec
- Long-Sault Bridge
- Sainte-Anne-de-Bellevue Canal - a canal further downstream, also a National Historic Site
