= Carillon hydroelectric generating station =

Dam on the Ottawa River in Canada

Carillon generating station
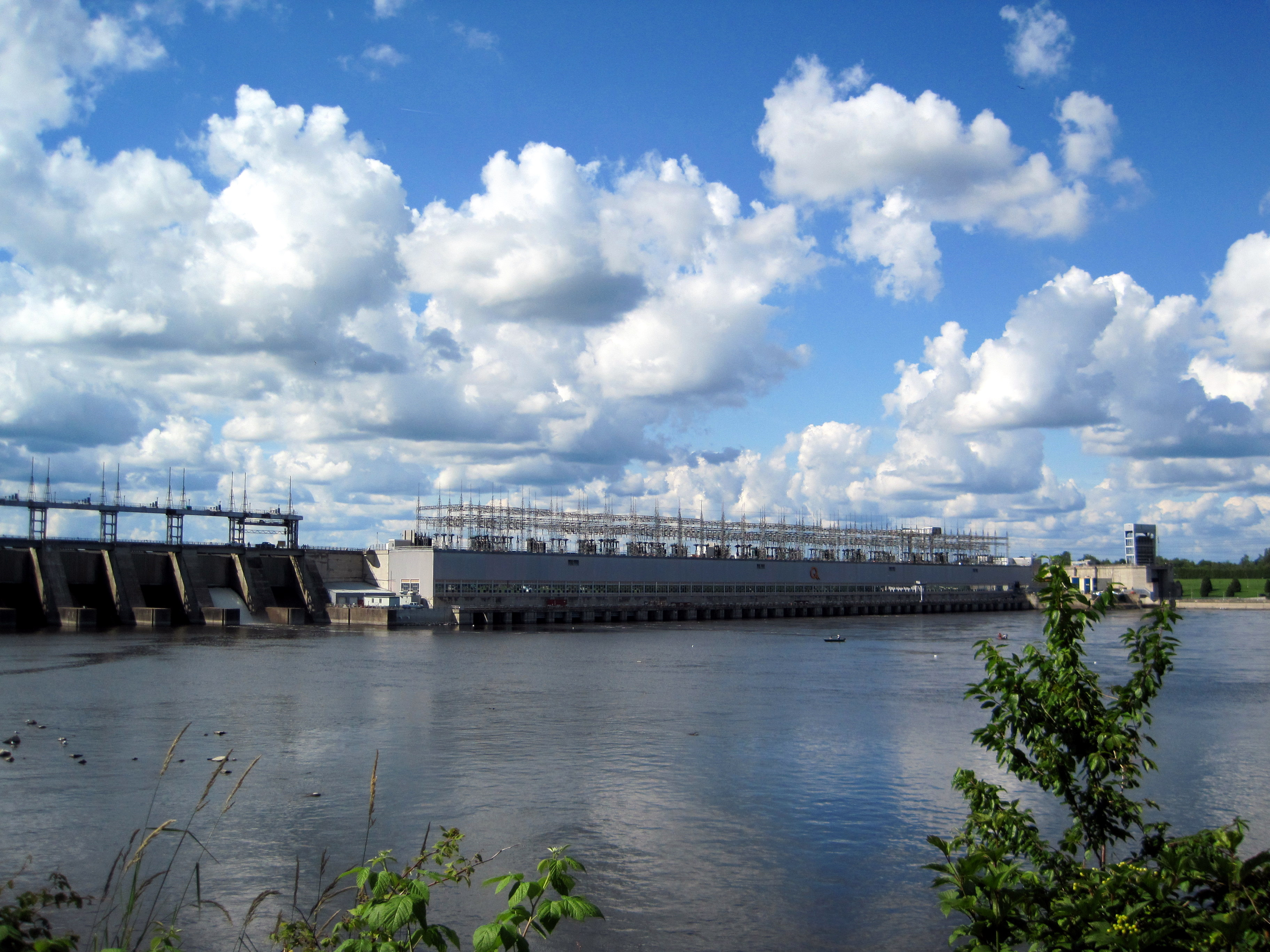
- The Carillon generating station and dam

- Location within Quebec
- Official name: Centrale de Carillon
- Location: Saint-André-d'Argenteuil, Quebec / East Hawkesbury, Ontario; Canada
- Coordinates: 45°34′07″N 74°23′01″W
- Status: Operational
- Construction began: 1959
- Opening date: 1962
- Owner: Hydro-Québec

Dam and spillways
- Type of dam: Barrage
- Impounds: Ottawa River

Reservoir
- Surface area: 26 km^{2} (10 mi^{2})

Power Station
- Hydraulic head: 17.99 m (59.0 ft)
- Turbines: 14 × kaplan propeller-type turbines
- Installed capacity: 752 MW

The Carillon generating station (in French: centrale de Carillon) is a hydroelectric power station on the Ottawa River near Carillon, Quebec, Canada. Built between 1959 and 1964, it is managed and operated by Hydro-Québec. It is a run-of-river generating station with an installed capacity of 752 megawatts (1,008,000 hp), a head of 17.99 meters (59.0 ft), and a reservoir of 26 square kilometers (10 sq mi). The dam spans the river between Carillon and Pointe-Fortune, Quebec.

Upon completion, the dam raised the water level by over 62 feet (19 m) at Carillon and over 9 feet (2.7 m) at Grenville. This inundated the rapids of Long-Sault on the Ottawa River, transforming them into calm (deeper) water. The dam also includes a modern lock that facilitates traffic on the Ottawa River, superseding the Carillon Canal.

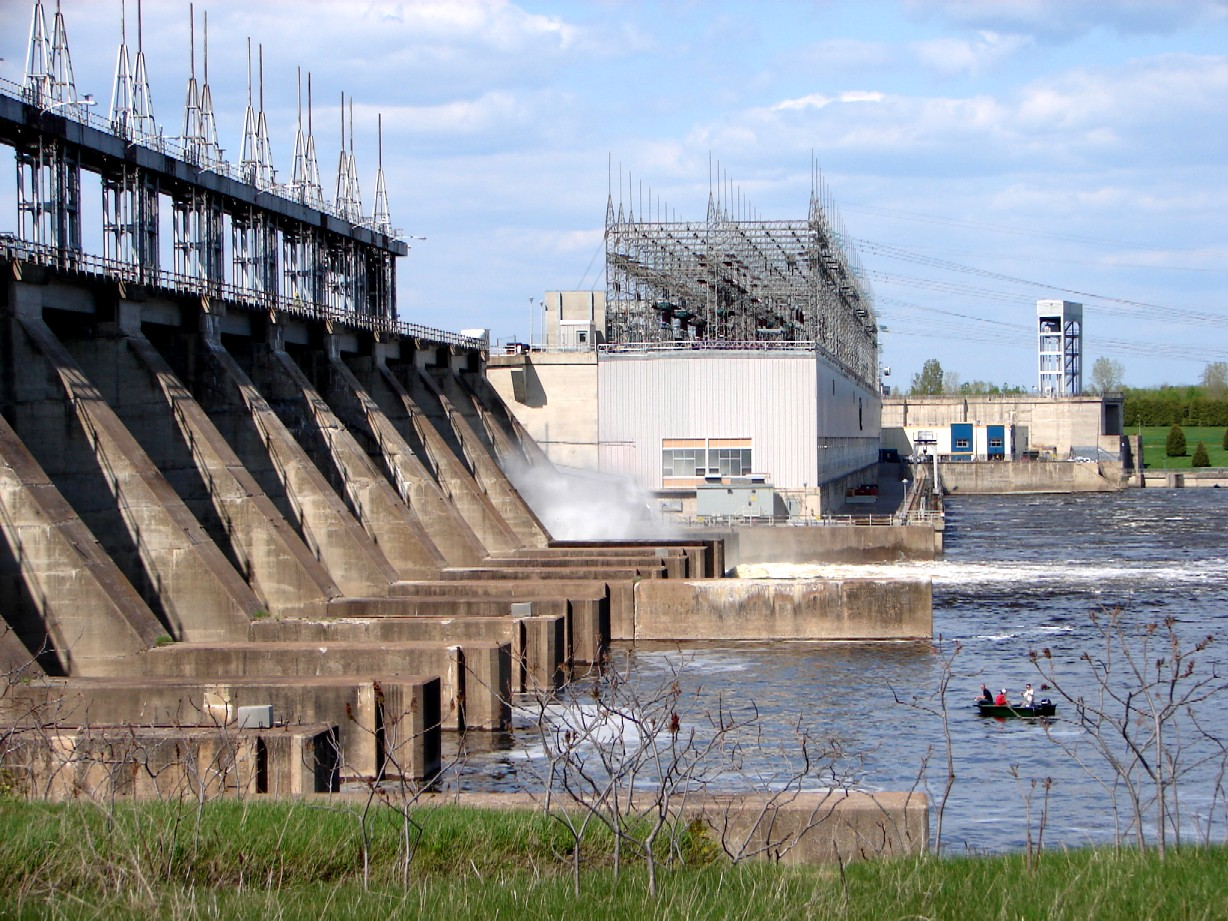
View from Ontario side

== See also ==
- List of crossings of the Ottawa River
- List of hydroelectric stations in Quebec
