= List of numbered roads in the United Counties of Prescott and Russell =

List of county roads

This page lists all of the numbered county roads in United Counties of Prescott and Russell, Ontario.

Number	Names	Western/Southern Terminus	Eastern/Northern Terminus	Major Communities	Comments
1	Du Golf Road, St. Pascal Road	Canaan Road (Boundary with the City of Ottawa. Continues as Ottawa Road 28)	Dead end, near the city limits of the City of Clarence-Rockland	St. Pascal Baylon, Ontario	
2	Russell Road, Boudreau Road, Plantagenet Concession 8	Canaan Road (Boundary with the City of Ottawa. Continues as Ottawa Road 26)	CR 9	Bourget, Ontario	
3	Craig Street, Castor Street, Notre Dame Street, Rue Notre Dame (Notre Dame Road), Ouest Route 500 (Route 500 West), Rue Principale (Principal Street), Chemin St. Isidore (St. Isidore Road), Route 600 East, Concession Road 18	CR 5 (Grove Lane, Boundary with the City of Ottawa. Continues as Ottawa Road 6)	CR 9	Russell, Ontario, Embrun, Ontario, Casselman, Ontario, Ste-Rose-de-Prescott, Ontario, St. Isidore de Prescott, Ontario	
4	Main Street, Front Road	CR 17	Interchange with Highway 417 and CR 14 (Exit 5)	Hawkesbury, Ontario	Even older alignment leads off into the Ottawa River towards Pointe-Fortune, Quebec, having since been flooded by the Carillon hydroelectric dam project in the late 1950s.
5	Russland Road, Finch Concession 10-11 Road (intersection at the boundary of Stormont, Dundas and Glengarry United Counties), just north of Crysler, Ontario. Continues as SDG CR 12.	Concurrency with Ottawa Road 8, northwest of Limoges, Ontario	Crysler, Ontario		
6	Marionville Road	Ottawa Road 41	CR 3 (SDG CR 7 turns back south as CR 6 turns north)	Russell, Ontario	Acts as the Stormont, Dundas and Glengarry United Counties boundary. Is concurrent with SDG CR 7.
7	Route 900, Albert Road, St. Albert Street	CR 5	CR 3	Casselman, Ontario, Mayerville, Ontario, St. Albert, Ontario	
8	Old Highway 17, Landry Street, Labonte Road, Champlain Road, Clarence-Cambridge Road, Boundary Road, County Road 8, Concession Road 20	Interchange with Highway 417 and Highway 138 (Exit 58)	Ferry Dock north of Clarence, Ontario on the Ottawa River	Clarence, Ontario, Rockland, Ontario, Bourget, Ontario	From CR 17 to Dallaire Road, CR 8 (Old Highway 17) is the former alignment of Highway 17
9	Treadwell Road, Lefaivre Road, Old Highway 17, Rue Ste. Catherine (St. Catherine Street), Highland Road	Interchange with Highway 417 and SDG CR 20 (Exit 50, on the county boundary)	CR 24	Treadwell, Ontario, Plantagenet, Ontario, St. Isidore de Prescott, Ontario, Parkers Corners, Ontario	From CR 26 to CR 17, road travels on an old alignment of Highway 17.
10	Concession Road 14, Ridge Road, Vankleek Hill Road, Main Street, Barb Road, Labrosse Street	CR 9	Quebec Provincial Boundary (Continues into the Vaudreuil-Soulanges Regional County Municipality, Quebec as Chemin du Haut-de-la-Chute (Upper Falls Road)	Parkers Corners, Ontario, Vankleek Hill, Ontario, Barb, Ontario, St. Eugene, Ontario	Has a brief concurrency with CR 12
11	Longueuil Street, Cassburn Road	CR 10	CR 24	L'Orignal, Ontario	
12	Barb Road, Golf Club Road	Overpass of Highway 417 (continues into United Counties of Stormont, Dundas and Glengarry, Ontario as SDG CR 23		Has a brief concurrency with CR 10	
14	St. Eugene Road	Hope-Quimet Road (Boundary with Stormont, Dundas and Glengarry United Counties. Continues as SDG CR 21)	Interchange with Highway 417 and CR 4 (Exit 5)	St. Eugene, Ontario	
15	Station Road, St. Philippe Street, Peat Moss Road, Concession Road 4, Lafaivre Road	CR 10	CR 14	Alfred, Ontario	
16	Ridge Road	CR 8	CR 9 near Fournier	Formerly served the ghost town of Lemieux.	Has a brief abandoned alignment near its southern terminus, where part of the road was destroyed by the Lemieux landslide of 1993.
17	County Road 17	Canaan Road (Boundary with the City of Ottawa. Continues as Ottawa Road 174.)	Interchange with Highway 417 (Exit 9), westbound access and eastbound egress only.	Rockland, Ontario, Clarence, Ontario, Wendover, Ontario, Plantagenet, Ontario, L'Orignal, Ontario, Hawkesbury, Ontario	Formerly part of Highway 17, until segments west of Highway 417 were downloaded in 1998. Has several former alignments, such as Chemin de la Baie (Bay Road) and Rue Laurier (Laurier Street) in Rockland, an abandoned alignment near Clarence, and CR 8 from CR 17, north to Clarence ("Old Highway 17"). This continues close to the Ottawa River as CR 55. Even older alignments lead off into the Ottawa River, having since been flooded by the Carillon hydroelectric dam project in the late 1950s.
18	County Road 18, Chemin du Ruban (Ribbon Road)	Boundary with Stormont, Dundas and Glengarry United Counties. Continues as SDG CR 24	Quebec Boundary (Continues as Ribbon Road for around 100 metres (300 feet) until meeting Route 325 (Montée Cardinal).		
19	Avenue du Quai (Quay Avenue), 9 Mile Road, County Road 19, Ettyville Road	CR 8	CR 55	Clarence, Ontario, Wendover, Ontario, Pendleton, Ontario, Ettyville, Ontario	
20	Caledonia Springs Road, Concession Road 1, Pearl Road, County Road 20	CR 17	CR 10		
21	County Road 21, Plantagenet Concession 1	CR 17	CR 9	Treadwell, Ontario	
22	St. Bernardin Road	Overpass of Highway 417 (Continues into Stormont, Dundas and Glengarry United Counties as SDG CR 30)	CR 10	St. Bernardin, Ontario	
23	Concession Road 7, McCrimmon Road	CR 22	Interchange with Highway 417 (Exit 45). (Continues as CR 23A on the Stormont, Dundas and Glengarry United Counties boundary.		
23A	McCrimmon Road	Stormont, Dundas and Glengarry United Counties CR 34 in McCrimmon, Ontario	Interchange with Highway 417 (Exit 35). (Continues as CR 23).	McCrimmon, Ontario	Straddles the SDG/Prescott-Russell County boundary
24	Alfred Concession 1, Bay Road, Front Road	CR 9	CR 4	Treadwell, Ontario, L'Orignal, Ontario	Former alignment of Highway 17. Even older alignment leads off into the Ottawa River (as Chemin du Domaine/Domaine Road), having since been flooded by the Carillon hydroelectric dam project in the late 1950s.
25	Concession Road 7, County Road 25	CR 18	CR 14		
26	Prescott Russell Road, Old Highway 17, County Road 26	CR 17	CR 9	Plantagenet, Ontario	Former alignment of Highway 17
27	County Road 27	Route 1000 (County Boundary with Stormont, Dundas and Glengarry United Counties)	CR 7		Continues as SDG CR 6
28	Chemin St. Guillaume (St. Guillaume Road)	CR 3	Interchange with Highway 417 (Exit 88). Continues into the City of Ottawa as Rockdale Road, to the community of Vars.	Embrun, Ontario, Vars, Ontario	
29	Ste-Marie Road	Marionville Road (County Boundary with Stormont, Dundas and Glengarry United Counties. Continues as SDG CR 32.)	CR 3	Embrun, Ontario	
41	Boundary Road, Gregoire Road	PR CR 6/SDG 7	City of Ottawa limits	This is an Ottawa Road, however, it acts as the border line for Prescott and Russell United Counties.	
55	Old Highway 17	PR CR 17/PR CR 26	PR CR 17/PR CR 8	Wendover, Ontario	Former alignment of Highway 17. No longer maintained or signed as a county road.
