= Ontario Highway 417 =

Controlled-access highway in Ontario

Highway 417
- Queensway (within Ottawa)
- Highway 417 highlighted in red

Route information
- Maintained by Ministry of Transportation of Ontario
- Length: 192.0 km (119.3 mi)
- Existed: 1971–present

Major junctions
- East end: A-40 (TCH) – Quebec border
- Highway 34 – Vankleek Hill; Highway 138 – Casselman; Highway 416 – Ottawa; Highway 7 – Ottawa
- West end: Highway 17 / TCH – Arnprior

Location
- Country: Canada
- Province: Ontario

Highway system
- Ontario provincial highways; Current; Former; 400-series
← Highway 416	→ Highway 418

King's Highway 417, commonly referred to as Highway 417 and as the Queensway through Ottawa, is a 400-series highway in the Canadian province of Ontario. It connects Ottawa with Montreal via A-40, and is the backbone of the highway system in the National Capital Region. Within Ottawa, it forms part of the Queensway west from Highway 7 to Ottawa Road 174. Highway 417 extends from the Quebec boundary (east of Hawkesbury) to Arnprior, where it continues westward as Highway 17. Aside from the urban section through Ottawa, Highway 417 passes through farmland that dominates much of the fertile Ottawa Valley. It is part of the Trans-Canada Highway, which connects Quebec with Manitoba.

Within Ottawa, the Queensway was built as part of a grand plan for the city between 1957 and 1966, and later reconstructed to its present form throughout the 1980s. The eastern section, from Gloucester to the Quebec border, opened in 1975 in preparation for the 1976 Montreal Olympics. Sections west of Ottawa have been under construction since the mid-1970s, with the section bypassing Arnprior opening on November 29, 2012 and another 5.3-kilometre (3.3 mi) stretch in December 2016.

The speed limit is 110 km/h (68 mph), except between Highway 416 and Ottawa Road 174, where the speed limit is 100 km/h (62 mph). The route is patrolled by the Ontario Provincial Police (OPP) and maintained by the Ministry of Transportation of Ontario (MTO).

== Route description ==
Highway 417 is a 192.0-kilometre (119.3 mi) long, controlled-access, divided highway (freeway) that traverses the lower Ottawa Valley and upper St. Lawrence Valley, bypassing the generally two-lane Highway 17 and providing a high-speed connection between Montreal and Ottawa via A-40. The freeway has also gradually been extended northwest from Ottawa alongside the old highway to its current terminus in Arnprior. Highway 417 currently has 42 interchanges from the Quebec border to Arnprior, with more planned as the highway is extended westward. Unlike other highways in Ontario and most of North America, exits are numbered from east to west. While a significant portion of Highway 417 is a rural four lane freeway divided by a grass median, the section within urban Ottawa is a busy commuter route as wide as ten lanes.

The portion of the route from the Highway 7 interchange east to The Split – a large four-way interchange between Highway 417, Ottawa Regional Road 174 and the Aviation Parkway – is known formally as the Queensway, although no indication of this name appears on any signage. The Queensway name continues along Ottawa Road 174 from the split with Highway 417 east to Trim Road.

=== Quebec to Ottawa ===
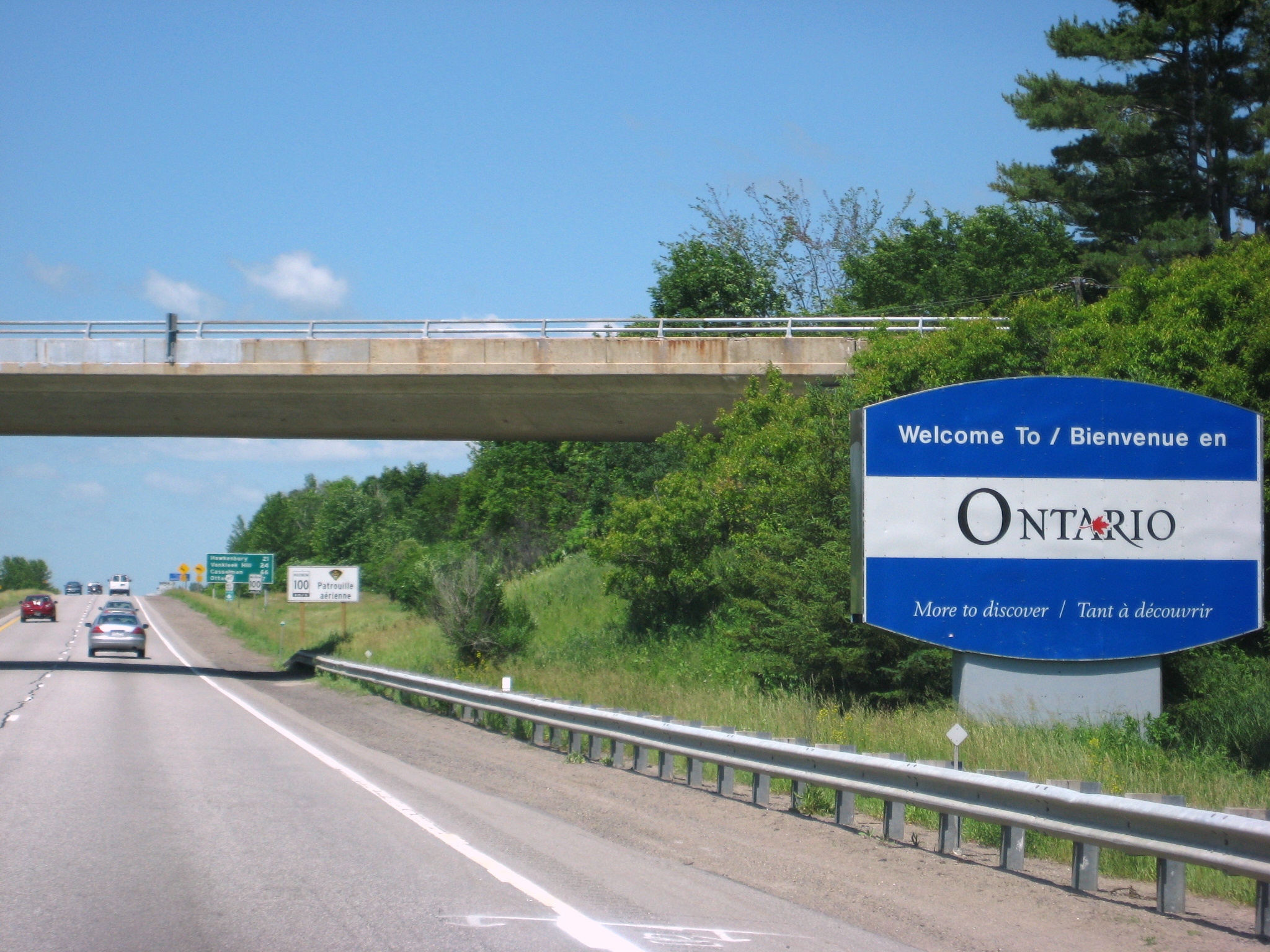
Autoroute 40 becomes Highway 417 at the Ontario border; both form the mainline of the Trans-Canada Highway.

Highway 417 begins at the border between the provinces of Ontario and Quebec, east of which the four lane freeway continues as Autoroute 40. The route proceeds west, south of the former alignment of Highway 17, which it has served to replace. It passes through a forested and agricultural landscape en route to Ottawa, serving the communities of Hawkesbury, Vankleek Hill, Casselman, Limoges and Vars. After approximately 9 kilometres (5.6 mi), the route curves southwest while ramps provide access from the westbound lanes to Prescott and Russell County Road 17 and from County Road 17 to the eastbound lanes of Highway 417. County Road 17 was formerly part of Highway 17 until it was decommissioned as a provincial highway in 1998. The route later meets the southern terminus of Highway 34 at Exit 27. Continuing southwest, the route meanders along the boundary between The Nation and North Glengarry, eventually encountering the northern terminus of Highway 138 — a highway built to connect Highway 417 with Highway 401 and Cornwall — east of Casselman. At this point, the freeway enters The Nation, then diverges from the boundary.

After crossing a Via Rail line, the route dips south of Casselman, then curves to the west at Exit 66 (County Road 7). It roughly parallels the Via Rail line several kilometres north of the freeway, though significant deviations bypass the communities of Benoit and Limoges; the latter is served by Exit 79 (County Road 5). Near Limoges is the Larose Forest, a man-made forest planted between 1928 and 1980 over the Bourget Desert, itself created as the result of clear cutting in the 19th century. At Exit 88, Highway 417 enters the City of Ottawa, though the surroundings remain unchanged and the highway remains largely rural until Exit 109 (Hunt Club Road), near Ramsayville.

North of Ramsayville, the route jogs abruptly to the west as it crosses Greens Creek and enters the suburbs of Ottawa; an interchange with Innes Road divides the countryside to the south and east from the city to the north and west. The highway merges with Ottawa Regional Road 174 (also known as The Queensway) at a large, two-level interchange known locally as The Split, curving to the west and into downtown Ottawa. This reunites Highway 417 with the former Highway 17, that portion which was renamed as Regional Road 174. The interchange also provides access to Aviation Parkway from westbound Highway 417 and from the parkway to eastbound Highway 417. West of this junction, Highway 417 assumes the route name of the Queensway.

=== Queensway ===
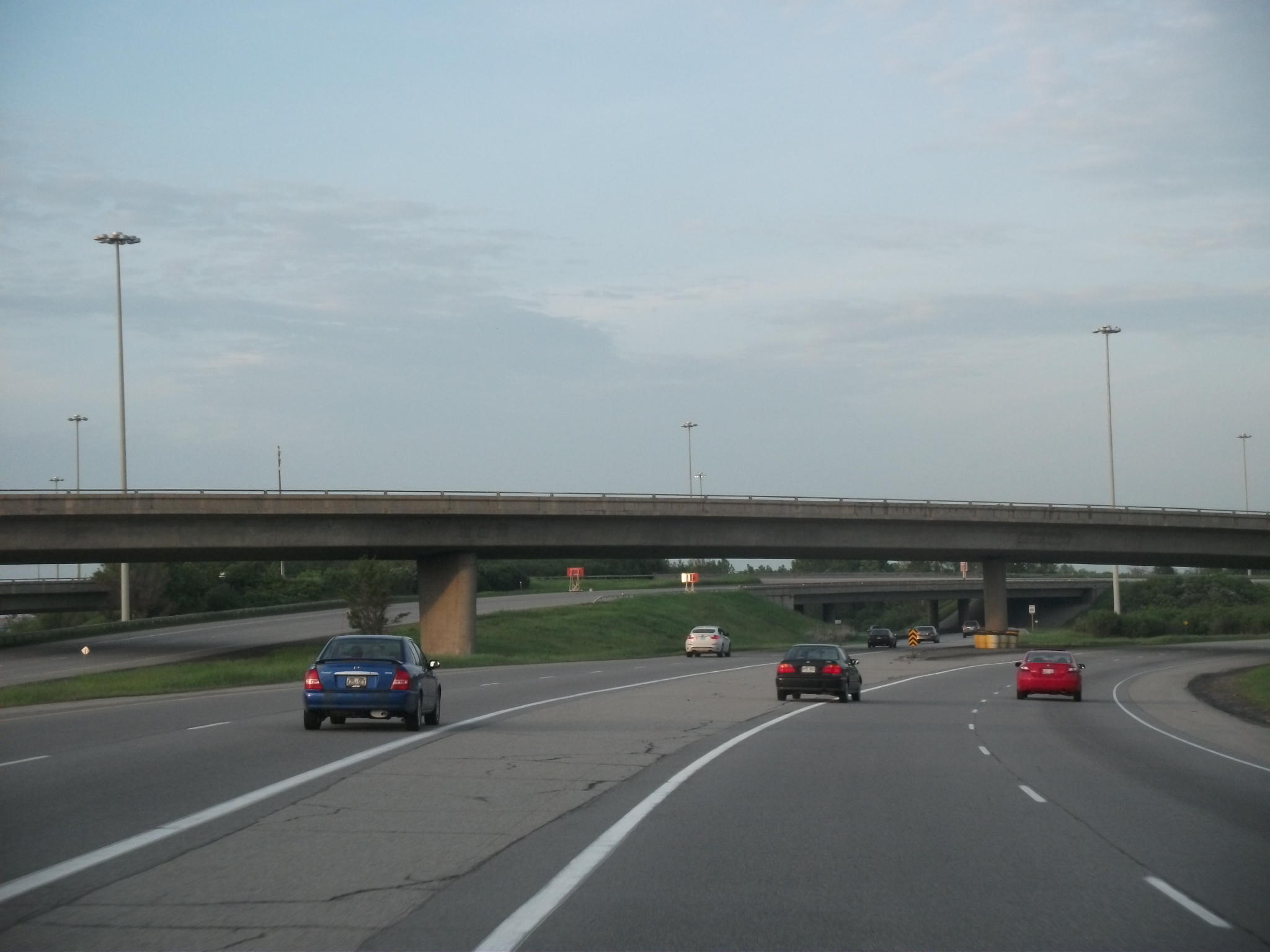
Highway 417 facing east at The Split with Ottawa Regional Road 174

Within Ottawa, the Queensway extends from Orleans in the east and passes just south of downtown through central Ottawa to Kanata in the west as an urban freeway. Two major interchanges anchor either end of this section: in the east, Highway 417 diverges south towards Montreal at The Split, while the Queensway continues east as Ottawa Regional Road 174 and Aviation Parkway branches north; in the west, Highway 416 travels south to Highway 401, a main freeway connecting Detroit via Toronto with Montreal. The core section of the Queensway is eight lanes wide, four per carriageway.

The freeway is elevated on a berm along some central portions of the route, providing views of downtown and the Gatineau Hills to the north. This section was constructed along a former Canadian National Railway (CN) railbed. The route bisects central Ottawa with downtown and the Parliament Buildings to the north of the highway, and residential neighbourhoods, including The Glebe, to the south. Towards the Richmond Road interchange, the original western terminus of the Queensway, both sides of the freeway are lined by residential subdivisions as the highway transitions back to a suburban setting.

Between Eagleson/March Road and Moodie Drive in the west and between Blair Road and Place d'Orléans Drive in the east, a bus-only shoulder is used by OCTranspo's Transitway rapid-transit network. Several closely spaced exits serve the downtown core of Ottawa, including Nicholas Street, Bronson Avenue and Metcalfe Street; the former was once designated as various provincial highways, most recently Highway 31.

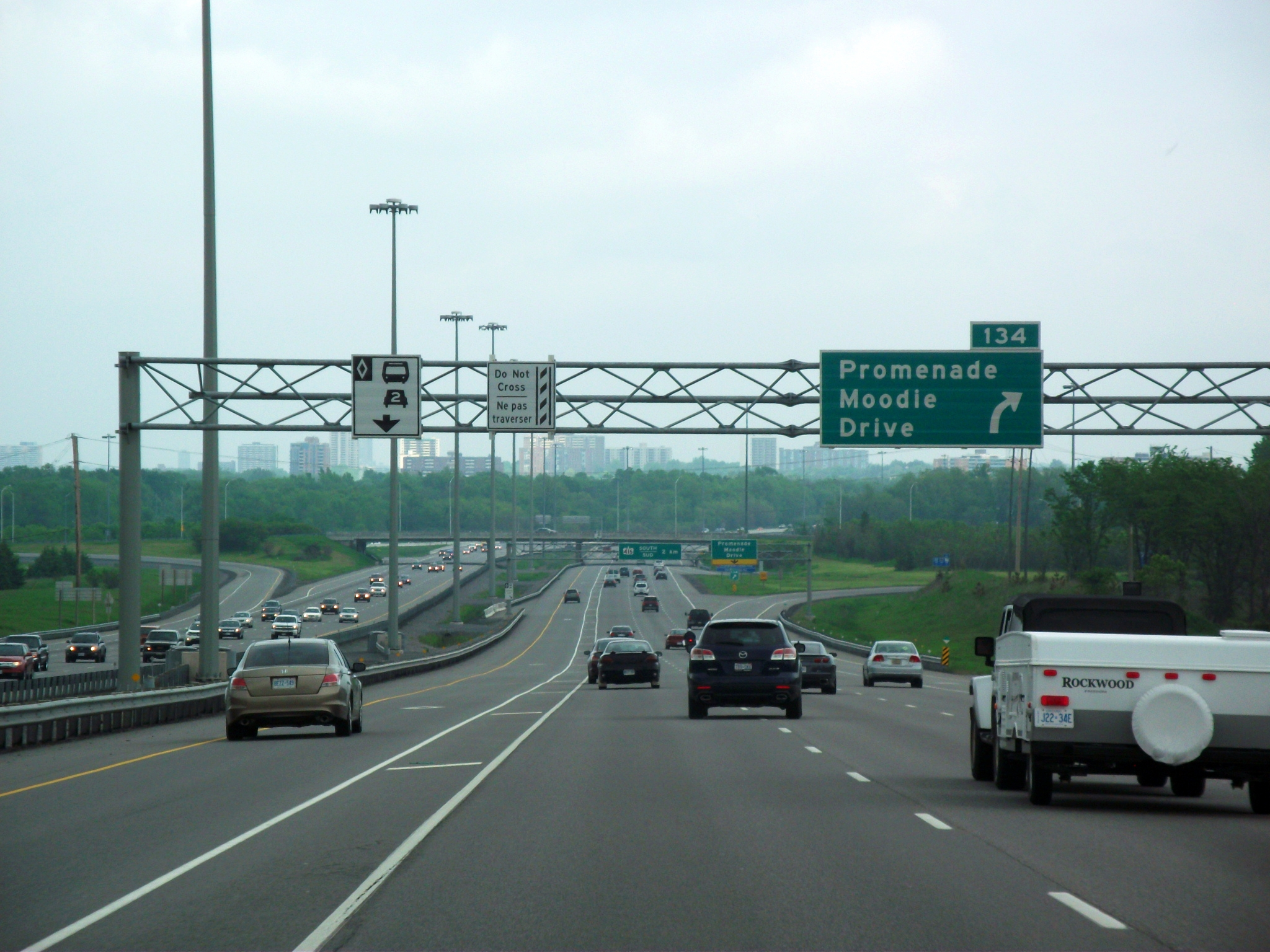
Highway 417 eastbound in Kanata approaching the interchange with Moodie Drive, showing the HOV lane in the eastbound carriageway.

=== West of Highway 416 to Arnprior ===
West of the interchange with Highway 416, the freeway enters the suburb of Kanata and travels through it in an east–west direction. At Exit 145, the route encounters the eastern terminus of Highway 7, which travels southwest to Peterborough and the Greater Toronto Area and provides an alternative route to Highway 401. Highway 417 makes a broad 90-degree curve to the north to meet with the midpoint of the Carp Bypass at the former Highway 44 (now Ottawa Regional Road 49); at Highway 7, the setting changes from suburban to rural.

The Carp Bypass was built in the mid-1960s as a bypass of the existing Highway 17, which meandered through the communities of Carp, Kinburn and Antrim; the former highway is now Donald B. Munro Drive, and lies to the east of Highway 417. The bypass was built as a two lane road with full control of access, avoiding existing properties and easily facilitating the upgrade to a freeway. North of Antrim, Highway 417 travels in a straight line parallel to old Highway 17 as far as Arnprior, where it curves to cross the Madawaska River. The divided freeway currently ends west of Campbell Drive, northwest of the town; it narrows to two lanes. Highway 417 officially ends and becomes Highway 17, which continus west to North Bay, Greater Sudbury, Thunder Bay, and eventually to the Manitoba border.

== History ==
=== Queensway ===
The Queensway facing west from Alta Vista Drive (now Riverside Drive/Vanier Parkway) in 1961

Highway 417 was initially constructed as a connection between the existing Queensway and Autoroute 40 in Quebec, the latter being constructed in advance of Expo 1967 and opening December 17, 1966. However, the designation has since been applied to the Queensway west of the interchange between the two freeways.

Construction of the Queensway was driven by the Greber Plan, which was produced by Jacques Gréber under the direction of Prime Minister Mackenzie King in the late 1940s. Although Gréber had been corresponding with King as early as 1936, World War II halted any plans from reaching fruition at that time. Following the war, Gréber was again contacted and his expertise requested. He arrived on October 2, 1945 and began working almost immediately. The Greber Plan, as it came to be known, was released in 1950 and presented to the House of Commons on May 22, 1951. The plan called for the complete reorganization of Ottawa's road and rail network, and included amongst the numerous parkways was an east to west expressway along what was then a Canadian National Railway line.

With the rail lines removed, construction of the new expressway got underway in 1957 when Queen Elizabeth visited Ottawa to open the first session of the 23rd Parliament. On October 15, the Queen detonated dynamite charges from the Hurdman Bridge, which now overlooks the highway as it crosses the Rideau River, and formally dedicated the new project as the Queensway. At the ceremony, premier Leslie Frost indicated that the entire project would cost C$31 million and emphasized the importance of the link to the Trans-Canada Highway.

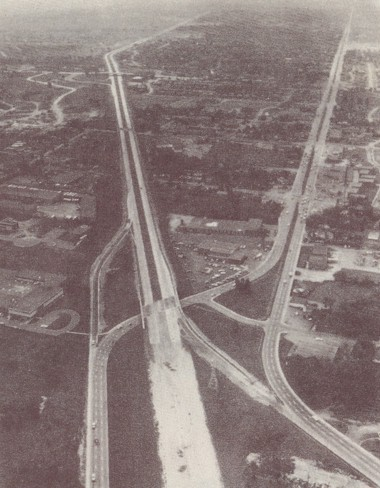
The Queensway in 1961 over Carling Avenue, following the completion of phase two

The Queensway was constructed in four phases, each opening independently: phase one, from Alta Vista Drive (now Riverside Drive) east to Highway 17 (Montreal Road); phase two, from Highway 7 and Highway 15 (Richmond Road) to Carling Avenue; phase three, from Carling Avenue to O'Connor Street; and, phase four, from O'Connor Street to Alta Vista Drive, crossing the Rideau Canal and Rideau River. Phase one opened to traffic on November 25, 1960, extending up to the Rideau River. On the western side of Ottawa, phase two opened a year later in October, 1961. The central section presented the greatest challenge, as an embankment was built to create grade-separations. In addition, the structures over the Rideau Canal and river required several years of construction. On May 15, 1964, the majority of the third phase was ceremonially opened, completing the Carling Avenue interchange and extending the freeway as far as Bronson Avenue. Several months later, on September 17 the short but complicated section east to O'Connor Street was opened. This left only phase four, the central section of the Queensway, which was opened in three segments. On November 26, 1965, the structures over the Rideau Canal were opened to traffic. At the same time, the westbound lanes of the Queensway were extended to Concord Street, located west of the Nicholas Street interchange. The interchange opened on January 1, 1966, allowing travel in both directions over the canal. The final segment, linking the two section of the Queensway, was placed into service on October 28, 1966. Following this, the Highway 17 designation was applied along the Queensway and the old routing renumbered as Highway 17B.

=== New freeway ===
Map of Highway 417 through Ottawa

Planning was underway on a new freeway, Highway 417, that would run east of Ottawa from the Queensway, connecting with A-40 to provide a high-speed route to Montreal. Highway 17, closely following the shore of the Ottawa River as it meanders towards Pointe-Fortune, was dangerous, narrow, and accident prone, earning it the nickname of "the killer strip". The awarding of the 1976 Summer Olympics to Montreal on May 12, 1970 resulted in an accelerated construction schedule due to the anticipated high volume of traffic that would be travelling the corridor between Ottawa and Montreal during the games. Contracts to construct the new route were opened to bidding on November 15, 1968; construction began in May 1969 starting at Base Line Road (now Ramsayville Road) and proceeding easterly.

The new freeway was built under a continuous construction program over the following 6 years, opening progressively as each segment of roadway was completed. The first 16 km (9.9 mi) segment, from Ramsayville Road to Rockdale Road, near Vars, opened on September 21, 1972. By the end of that month, the easternmost 9 km (5.6 mi) of Highway 17 had been converted into a divided freeway, and construction was progressing on the remainder of the route. On October 1, 1973, a 14 km (8.7 mi) section of freeway opened between Vars and Limoges. On July 15, 1974, Minister of Transportation and Communications John Rhodes ceremonially opened the next section of Highway 417, between Limoges Road and Highland Road. The section between Highland Road and Highway 17 opened on November 8, 1974, connecting with the existing section leading from the Quebec boundary. The final segment of the new route, connecting the section east of Ramsayville with the Queensway, was opened to traffic on December 2, 1975. The cost of the entire eastern segment was $77 million ($407 million in 2025 dollars). The Trans-Canada Highway designation was not applied to this section of Highway 417 until Highway 17 was decommissioned as a provincial route in 1998.

=== Extensions and expansions ===
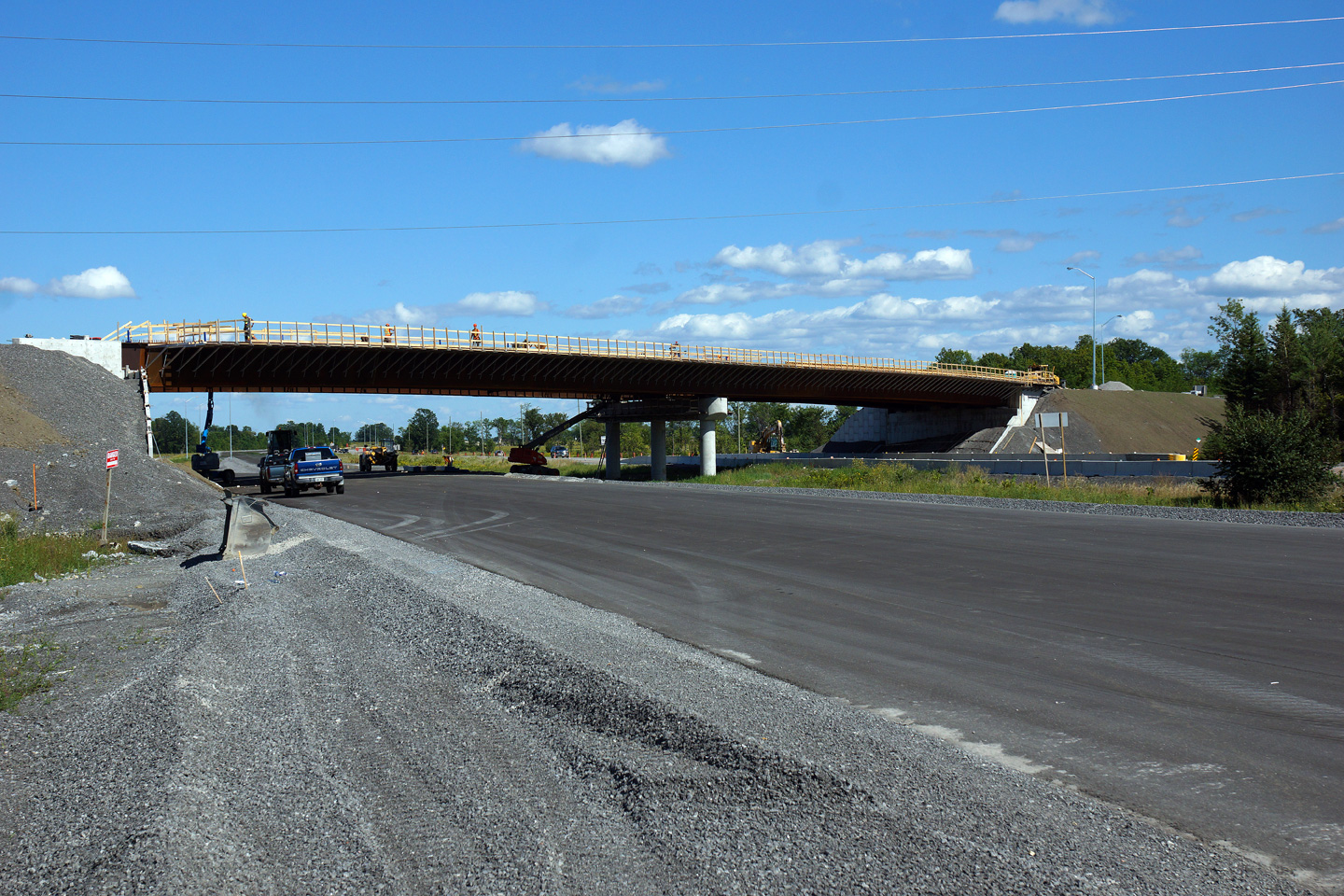
New grade separation that now carries traffic on Campbell Drive over Highway 417, under construction in August 2015

Meanwhile, to the west of Ottawa, planning got underway on a continuation of the Queensway. This extension was designed to connect with the Carp Bypass – a portion of Highway 17 designed to bypass the old meandering route (now known as Donald B. Munro Drive) through Carp, Marathon and Antrim that opened November 9, 1965 – with an interchange and connection to Highway 7. Prior to the completion of this section of freeway, Highway 17 followed Carling Avenue and March Road from Ottawa to west of Carp. Construction began in the west end of Ottawa in 1967. On October 31, 1969, a short extension to Moodie Drive was completed, including the realignment of that road for continuity north and south of Highway 417. The following year, the freeway was extended to March Road. Construction halted at the eastern edge of Kanata for several years while a study was conducted into the merits of building the highway in a trench through the established city. During this time, construction began in 1974 on the future Queensway and Highway 7 interchange. Work also began on the two lane connections to Highway 7 as well as to the Highway 17 and Highway 44 junction west of Carp at the same time.

Upon the completion of the Ottawa–Quebec section of freeway, the Queensway was designated as Highway 417 west of The Split. With the completion of the Kanata study during early 1976, work began to build the route through the city-centre in a depressed-grade; as a result all the crossings through that section pass over the freeway. By early 1978, the western extension was opened to traffic, providing four lanes between Richmond Road and Highway 7 / 417. The two legs beyond the interchange were initially constructed as two-lane undivided roads, and remained as such for over a decade.

Throughout the 1980s, work on Highway 417 shifted from extensions to expansions. Within Ottawa, the initially four lane route, separated by a wide grass median, was expanded to eight lanes with paved shoulders and centre-mounted lighting beginning in 1982. To reduce weaving, the westbound exit at Kent Street was removed during this work. Expansion of the two lane Highway 17 west of the interchange with Highway 7 got underway in 1991; this section was renumbered as Highway 417 as construction progressed westward. The construction saw a second two lane roadway built parallel to the existing route to create a divided freeway, a process known as twinning.

The MTO also set out to design a four-lane route to connect Highway 417 with Highway 16 New (which would be renamed as Highway 416 after completion), including a three-level directional-T interchange. A contract for this interchange was awarded in late 1989 and construction began in 1990.

When the twinning of Highway 17 reaching March Road had concluded by 1994, new contracts were tendered to continue the process northward. Bot Construction was awarded the contract for the section north to Panmure Road on December 9, 1998. On February 16, 2000, the Ministry of Transportation of Ontario (MTO) officially announced that Highway 417 would be extended to Arnprior over the next several years. A contract to build the freeway from north of Panmure Road to south of Arnprior was tendered in early 2002. This work was completed and the extension opened to traffic on September 24, 2004.

Concurrent with the twinning of Highway 7 between Carleton Place and Ottawa, the interchange with Highway 417 was upgraded to support the divided traffic flows; a new flyover ramp was built connecting westbound Highway 417 with westbound Highway 7. Construction began on August 22, 2006, and was opened in June 2008 along with the Highway 7 expansion.

Construction to twin the Arnprior Bypass portion of Highway 17, which included a new interchange at White Lake Road, began during the spring of 2009. The bypass was originally built in 1981 as one of a number of upgrades to Highway 17 between Ottawa and North Bay. It was intended for directing through traffic around downtown Arnprior and was designed for an eventual upgrade to a divided freeway. The major structure in this project was a second crossing of the Madawaska River. Work was completed in late 2012; the new 5.6 km (3.5 mi) section was opened ceremonially on November 29 and cost $63 million, $7 million less than projected.

Starting in 2003, the Ontario Ministry of Transportation developed plans for an extensive upgrade of Highway 417 between Highway 7 (Exit 145) and Anderson Road (Exit 104). The addition of lanes and off-ramps into residential areas was resisted by several local community groups. The study was completed in January 2007 with recommendations to expand or rebuild sections of the highway. The entire length was recommended to be eight lanes wide, and many interchanges will be rebuilt for safety and capacity reasons. In particular, one interchange at Parkdale Avenue will be rebuilt by buying the houses on the south side of Westmount Avenue and moving the ramp to that location thus eliminating the use of Westmount Avenue as the off ramp. The recommendations were significantly scaled back from the beginning of the study process due to public opposition.

In August 2007, the Island Park Drive overpass underwent rapid bridge replacement, a novel process in Ontario at the time. The replacement bridge was built nearby in Hampton Park.

In Kanata, Highway 417 was widened from four/six lanes to eight lanes between Highway 416 and Palladium Drive, with the ramp for incoming traffic from Highway 416 being extended as far as Moodie Drive, where it merges to the left side of the westbound carriageway. For the railway underpass west of Moodie Drive, the westbound precast post-tensioned bridge that was rehabilitated in 2003 was retained and expanded, while for the eastbound lanes a new concrete girder bridge was constructed to replace the old post-tensioned structure originally built in 1969. From Moodie Drive to Palladium Drive the additional leftmost lanes are designated as HOV lanes. Highway 417 was also widened from four to six lanes between Palladium Drive and Highway 7, concurrent with Highway 7 to Carleton Place being upgraded to a freeway including the expansion of its terminus interchange with Highway 417. The work on the westbound lanes was completed in late-October 2014, with the eastbound lanes completed in mid-November 2014. This expansion was intended to relieve congestion, especially when events occur at Canadian Tire Centre.

The segment between Nicholas Street and Ottawa Road 174 was widened with an additional two lanes per direction, construction of which began in 2013 and completed on-time in 2015. The additional pair of lanes were used as bus lanes temporarily, until 2018, at which point they became general traffic lanes. This project involved the replacement of the Nicholas Street and Vanier Parkway overpasses as well as widening the Rideau River bridges.

== Future ==
The MTO plans to further extend Highway 417 westerly through the Ottawa Valley by twinning and realigning the existing route to a four-lane freeway beyond Arnprior, where it currently merges into a two-laned Highway 17. Route planning has been completed to Pembroke, with a bypass to the east of the Cobden area. The second phase of the extension to be built (phase 1 was the section around Arnprior) is a 5.3 km (3.3 mi) extension past Campbell Drive to Scheel Drive northwest of Arnprior, under construction as of June 26, 2014 and completed in 2016. Phases 3 and 4 total 22.5 kilometres (14.0 mi) including four new interchanges and will take the 417 from Scheel Drive to a point 3 kilometres (2 mi) west of Bruce Street (Town of Renfrew). The design stage of this phase was announced in August 2017.

Planning and construction efforts to upgrade Highway 17 through Sudbury and east of North Bay have prompted speculation that Highway 417 will continue to be extended west through Northern Ontario; although no comprehensive conversion plan has been announced to date, Sault Ste. Marie MPP David Orazietti has spearheaded a petition to have the entire highway four-laned from Arnprior to Sault Ste. Marie, similar to the campaign previously undertaken by his caucus colleague Rick Bartolucci regarding the extension of Highway 400. Cheryl Gallant, the federal Member of Parliament for Renfrew—Nipissing—Pembroke, has also advocated the four-laning of the highway through the Ottawa Valley toward North Bay, and ultimately the entire length of the highway throughout Northern Ontario.

== Exit list ==
The following table lists the major junctions along Highway 417, as noted by the Ministry of Transportation of Ontario. Unlike other highways in Ontario, Highway 417 is measured from east to west, and as such this table is presented in that order.

Division	Location	km	mi	Exit	Destinations	Notes
Prescott and Russell	East Hawkesbury	0.0	0.0	—	A-40 (TCH) east – Montreal	Continuation into Quebec
Prescott and Russell	East Hawkesbury	5.1	3.2	5	County Road 4 (Front Road) – Chute-à-Blondeau; County Road 14 (Prescott & Russell Road) – Saint Eugene	
Prescott and Russell	East Hawkesbury	9.5	5.9	9	County Road 17 west – Hawkesbury, Rockland	Westbound exit and eastbound entrance; formerly Highway 17 west
Prescott and Russell	East Hawkesbury	16.8	10.4	17	County Road 10 (Barb Road) – Vankleek Hill, Saint Eugene	
Prescott and Russell – Stormont, Dundas and Glengarry boundary	Champlain – North Glengarry boundary	27.5	17.1	27	Highway 34 north – Vankleek Hill, Hawkesbury; County Road 34 south – Alexandria, Lancaster	Formerly Highway 34 south
Prescott and Russell – Stormont, Dundas and Glengarry boundary	The Nation – North Glengarry boundary	33.8	21.0	35	County Road 23A (McCrimmon Road) – Alexandria, Saint Bernardin	Provides an alternate route to County Road 34 south
Prescott and Russell – Stormont, Dundas and Glengarry boundary	The Nation – North Glengarry boundary	50.7	31.5	51	County Road 9 north (Ste-Catherine Street) – Saint Isidore; County Road 20 south (Highland Road) – Saint Elmo, Maxville	
Prescott and Russell – Stormont, Dundas and Glengarry boundary	The Nation – North Stormont boundary	57.8	35.9	58	Highway 138 south – Monkland, Cornwall; County Road 8 north – Casselman, Lemieux	
Prescott and Russell	Casselman	65.7	40.8	66	County Road 7 (Principale Street / St. Albert Road) – Crysler, Saint Albert	
Prescott and Russell	The Nation – Russell boundary	79.0	49.1	79	County Road 5 (Limoges Road) – Limoges, Crysler	Provides access to nearby Calypso Park
Ottawa		87.8	54.6	88	Road 33 (Rockdale Road) – Vars, Russell, Embrun	
Ottawa		95.8	59.5	96	Road 41 (Boundary Road) – Metcalfe, Marionville, Russell, Carlsbad Springs	
Ottawa		103.5	64.3	104	Road 27 (Anderson Road)	
Ottawa		106.9	66.4	109	Road 32 (Hunt Club Road)	Access to Ottawa Macdonald–Cartier International Airport
Ottawa		109.2	67.9	110	Walkley Road	
Ottawa		111.6	69.3	112	Innes Road	
Ottawa		113.1	70.3	113A	Road 174 east (Queensway) – Orléans, Rockland	Locally known as "The Split"; formerly Highway 17 east
Ottawa		113.1	70.3	113B	Aviation Parkway	Westbound exit and eastbound entrance
Ottawa		114.3	71.0	115	St. Laurent Boulevard	Westbound exit accessible only from Road 174, no eastbound access from northbound St. Laurent Boulevard
Ottawa		116.0	72.1	117	Vanier Parkway / Riverside Drive	To Ottawa station
Ottawa		117.4	72.9	118	Nicholas Street to A-5 / Mann Avenue / Lees Avenue – Gatineau	To Macdonald-Cartier Bridge
Ottawa		118.6	73.7	119	Metcalfe Street; Catherine Street	
Ottawa		119.2	74.1	120	Kent Street	Eastbound exit
Ottawa		120.0	74.6	121A	Bronson Avenue	No eastbound entrance; to Ottawa Macdonald–Cartier International Airport; formerly Highway 17B / Highway 16 / Highway 31
Ottawa		120.6	74.9	121B	Rochester Street	Eastbound exit and westbound entrance
Ottawa		122.1	75.9	122	Parkdale Avenue	To The Ottawa Hospital
Ottawa		123.1	76.5	123	Island Park Drive	Westbound exit
Ottawa		123.9	77.0	124	Carling Avenue; Kirkwood Avenue	Formerly Highway 17B
Ottawa		125.8	78.2	126	Maitland Avenue – Nepean	Despite now being part of Ottawa proper and inside the Greenbelt, Nepean is still listed as a destination on exit signage for exits #126 and #127
Ottawa		127.3	79.1	127	Woodroffe Avenue – Nepean	Signed as exits 127A (north) and 127B (south) westbound; to Fallowfield station
Ottawa		129.4	80.4	129	Pinecrest Road / Greenbank Road	
Ottawa		130.7	81.2	130	Richmond Road; Holly Acres Road; Bayshore Drive	Signed as Richmond Road / Holly Acres Road (eastbound) and Richmond Road / Bayshore Drive (westbound); formerly Highway 17B east
Ottawa		131.6	81.8	131	Via Highway 401 via Highway 416 south – Prescott, Kingston, Toronto	Cities not listed on signage; Highway 416 exit 75
Ottawa		133.6	83.0	134	Moodie Drive	
Ottawa		137.6	85.5	138	Road 49 (March Road / Eagleson Road) – Kanata	
Ottawa		139.3	86.6	139	Kanata Avenue north / Castlefrank Road – Kanata	Westbound exit and eastbound entrance
Ottawa		140.3	87.2	140	Road 61 (Terry Fox Drive) – Kanata	
Ottawa		142.7	88.7	142	Road 88 (Palladium Drive) – Kanata	Canadian Tire Centre is located just southeast of this exit. The newly-constructed Tanger Outlet Mall, which opened in October 2014, is located on the north side of the interchange.
Ottawa		144.8	90.0	144	Road 5 (Carp Road) – Stittsville, Carp	
Ottawa		145.7	90.5	145	Highway 7 west / TCH – Carleton Place, Toronto	
Ottawa		154.9	96.3	155	Road 49 (March Road) – Almonte, Carp	Formerly Highway 44 west
Ottawa		163.6	101.7	163	Panmure Road	
Ottawa		170.4	105.9	169	Road 20 (Kinburn Side Road) – Pakenham, Kinburn	
Ottawa		180.5	112.2	180	Road 29 – Arnprior, Carleton Place	Formerly Highway 15 south
Renfrew	Arnprior	183.9	114.3	184	County Road 2 (White Lake Road / Daniel Street S.) – Arnprior	
Renfrew	McNab/Braeside	187.1	116.3	187	Campbell Drive	
Renfrew	McNab/Braeside	192.0	119.3	—	Highway 17 west / TCH – Petawawa, North Bay	Freeway ends; continues west as Highway 17
1.000 mi = 1.609 km; 1.000 km = 0.621 mi: Incomplete access; Route transition

== See also ==
- Royal eponyms in Canada

Trans-Canada Highway
Previous routes Highway 17 Highway 7	Highway 417	Next route QC Autoroute 40
