= South Indian (disambiguation) =

South Indian may refer to:

- South India
- South Indian, Ontario, renamed Limoges in 1926
- The South Indian Ocean
