= Alfred Bog =

Bog in Eastern Ontario, Canada

- Tourbière d'Alfred
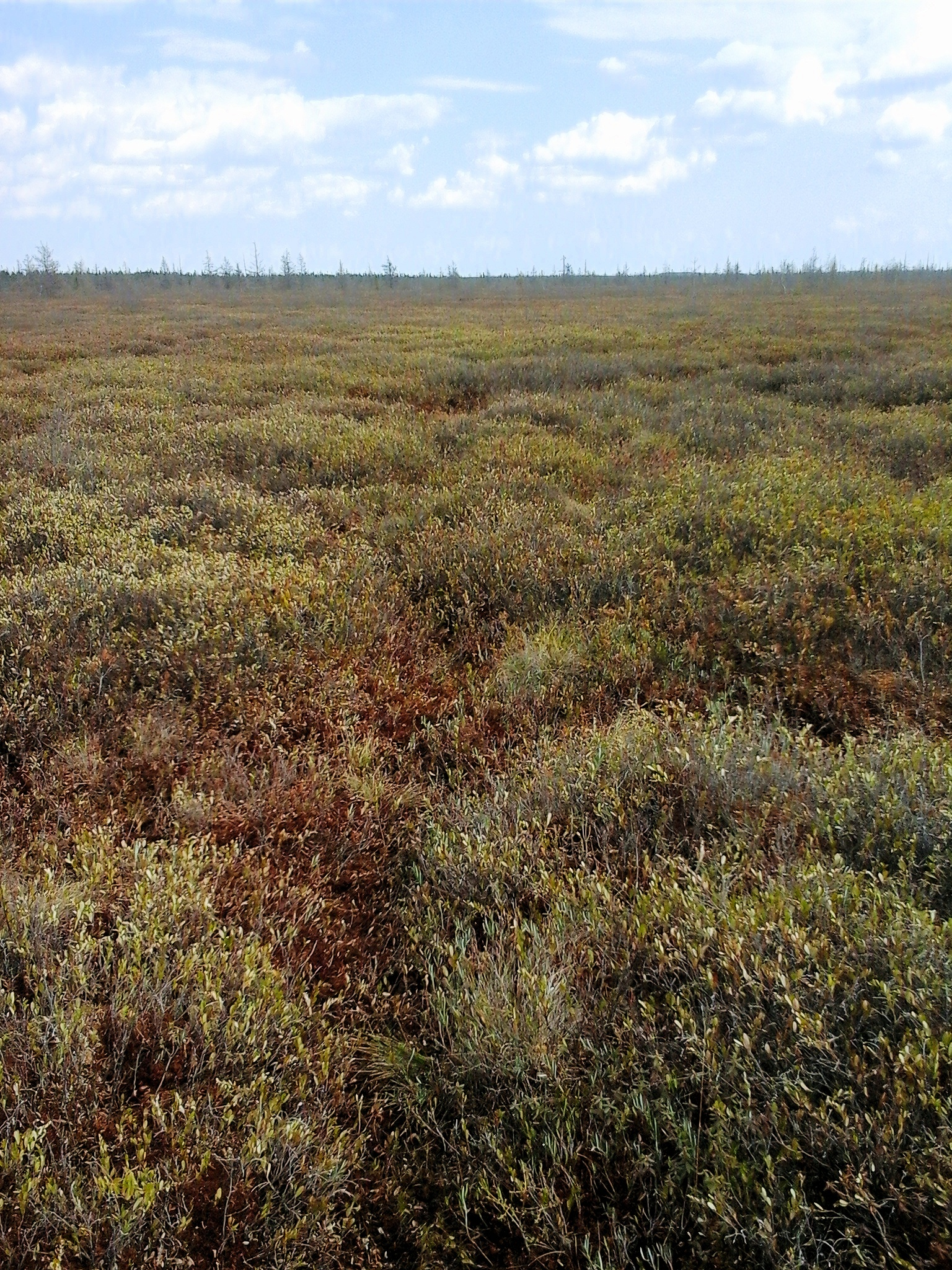

- Location within Southern Ontario
- Location: Eastern Ontario, Canada
- Nearest town: Alfred, Ontario
- Coordinates: 45°29′30″N 74°50′30″W
- Area: 10,200 acres (41 km^{2})
- Governing body: Ontario Parks
- Owner: multiple

The Alfred Bog (French: Tourbière d'Alfred) is a domed peat bog in Eastern Ontario, Canada, about 7 kilometres (4.3 mi) south of Alfred and 70 kilometres (43 mi) east of Ottawa. The bog is considered the largest high-quality bog in Southern Ontario, and is home to rare animal species and a healthy moose population. The bog is accessible by a 273-metre (896 ft) long boardwalk.

The wetland, primarily consisting of bog as well as some marsh and swamp, is 10,200 acres (4,100 ha) in size of which 3,067 hectares (7,580 acres) is a natural environment class provincial park since 2023.

== History ==
The bog formed at the confluence of an ancient channel of the Ottawa River and South Nation River after the retreat of the Champlain Sea. The Ottawa River used to drain melting glacial waters from central Manitoba, but gradually reduced its flow and changed its course to its present location. Two large bogs, Mer Bleue at the west end and Alfred Bog at the east end, formed in the former southern channel.

In the early 19th century, the Alfred Bog covered about 26,000 acres (11,000 ha), more than twice its present size, extending right to the town of Alfred. In 1806, it was described as "a thick spruce and cedar swamp with large areas of marsh". Human development of agriculture and peat extraction since then greatly reduced the bog. In the early 20th century, the Canadian government encouraged commercial peat extraction since peat could serve as an alternative fuel source to coal. A narrow-gauge railway was built to facilitate extraction, as well as a separate rail siding along the Montreal-Ottawa (M&O) line for shipping. By 1945, the bog was already reduced to 5,000 hectares (12,000 acres). As a result of the peat removal, the bog is generally between 1 and 2 metres (3 ft 3 in and 6 ft 7 in) higher than the surrounding farmland. Periodic burns and presence of drainage ditches have also changed the natural conditions of the remaining bog.

Conservation efforts began in 1981 when zoning changes were proposed to allow new peat harvesting development. Since then the protected land has grown incrementally through the purchase of parcels of land from commercial and private owners. About 90% of the bog was protected as a provincial nature preserve by a variety of organizations (such as Nature Conservancy of Canada, South Nation Conservation, Ottawa Field-Naturalists Club, United Counties of Prescott and Russell, Environment Canada, and the Ministry of Natural Resources, among others). It was designated by the Ontario Ministry of Natural Resources as a "Class 1 Wetland" and an "Area of Natural and Scientific Interest (ANSI)" in 1984,

In 2018, planning began to convert it into a provincial park, and effective on July 27, 2023, Ontario Regulation 316/07 of the Provincial Park and Conservation Reserves Act was amended to create Alfred Bog Provincial Park as a 3,067 ha (7,580 acres) non-operating natural environment class park.

== Flora ==
The vegetation is characteristic of boreal forest, normally found much farther north. Being a domed bog, water enters the bog mainly from natural precipitation creating oligotrophic conditions, ideal for sphagnum moss, the bog's dominant vegetation. The peat ranges in depth from 1.2 to 7.1 metres (3 ft 11 in to 23 ft 4 in), with an average depth of 4.5 metres (15 ft).

Some of the rare plants in the bog are white fringed orchid, Atlantic sedge, and rhodora.

Tree species:

- Swamp birch (Betula glandulosa)
- Black spruce (Picea mariana)
- Tamarack (Larix laricina)
- Red maple (Acer rubrum)

Shrub species:

- Purple chokeberry (Aronia prunifolia)
- Winterberry (Ilex verticillata)
- Mountain holly (Ilex mucronata)
- Low sweet blueberry (Vaccinium angustifolium)
- Velvet leaf blueberry (Vaccinium myrtilloides)
- Leatherleaf (Chamaedaphne calyculata)
- Labrador tea (Ledum groenlandicum)
- Sheep laurel (kalmia angustifolia)
- Bog laurel (Kalmia polifolia)
- Bog rosemary (Andromeda glaucophylla)
- Wild raisin (Viburnum cassinoides)
- Small bog cranberry (Vaccinium oxycoccos)

Herbs/grasses/mosses:

- Bog Solomon's seal (Smilacina trifolia)
- Creeping snowberry (Gaultheria hispidula)
- Cotton grass (Eriophorum viridicarinatum)
- Tufted bog cotton (Eriophorum spissum)
- Carex (Carex)
- Mosses (Pohlia nutans, Sphagnum fuscum, and Polytrichum commune)
- Bristly club-mMoss (Lycopodium annotinum)

== Fauna ==
Some of the rare animals in the bog are the Bog Elfin butterfly, Fletcher's dragonfly, and spotted turtle.

Regionally rare birds found at the Alfred Bog are black-backed woodpecker, Canada jay, palm warbler, northern hawk-owl, sedge wren, and Wilson's warbler, with sandhill cranes seen seasonally.

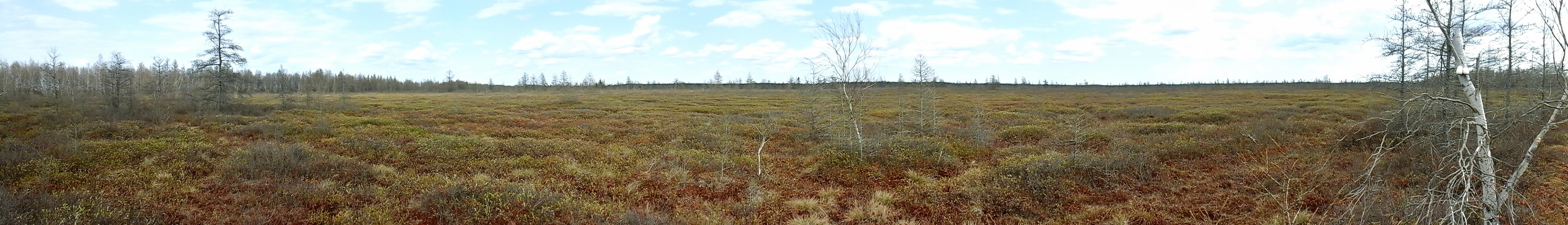
Panorama of the Alfred Bog
