= South Nation River =

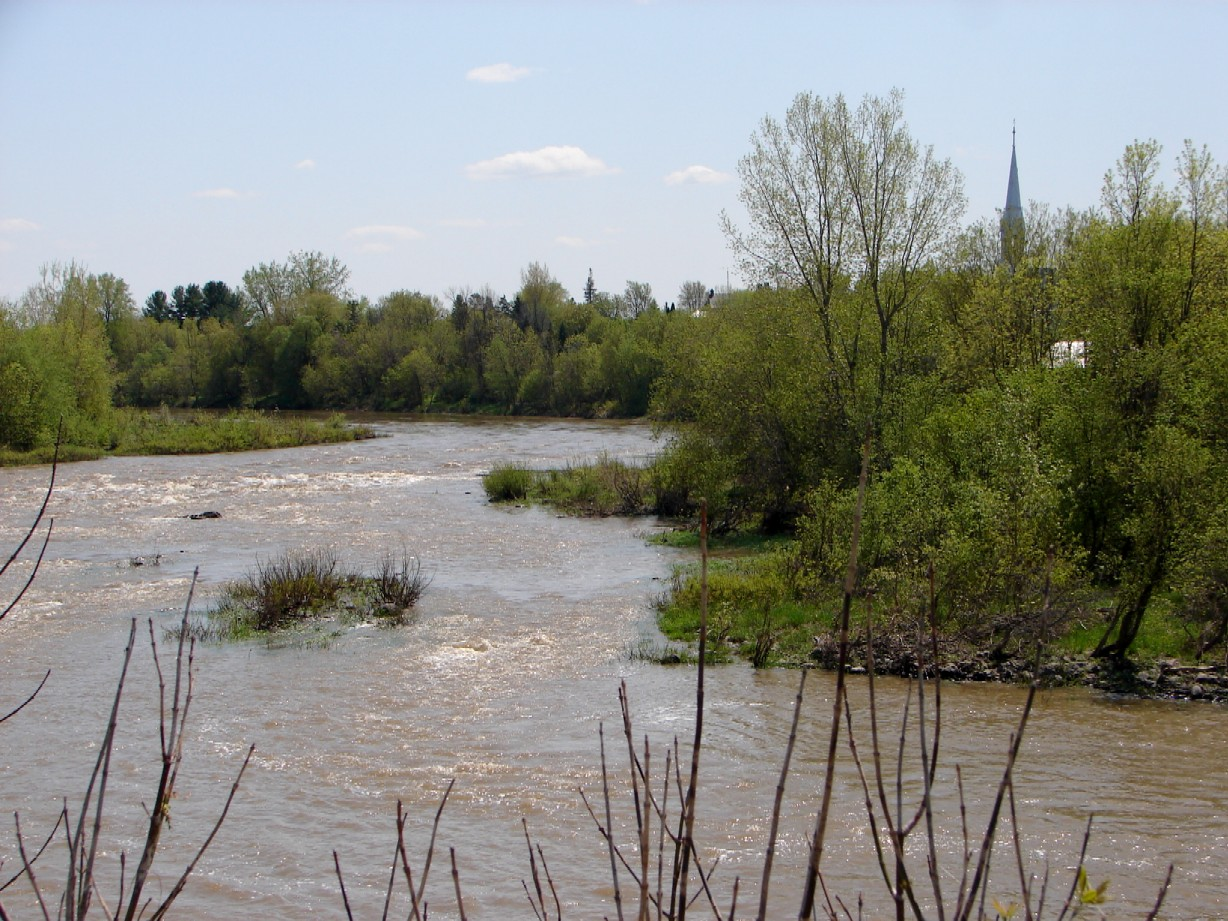
- South Nation River at Plantagenet

- Location of the mouth of the South Nation River in eastern Ontario

Location
- Country: Canada
- Province: Ontario
- Region: Eastern Ontario

Physical characteristics
- Source
  - location: Near Fairfield East, Leeds and Grenville County
  - coordinates: 44°40′30″N 75°42′00″W
- Mouth: Ottawa River
  - location: 2 km east of Wendover, Prescott and Russell County
  - coordinates: 45°34′23″N 75°06′00″W
  - elevation: 45 m (148 ft)
- Length: 175 km (109 mi)
- Basin size: 3,900 km^{2} (1,500 sq mi)

Basin features
- Progression: Ottawa River→ St. Lawrence River→ Gulf of St. Lawrence
- River system: Ottawa River drainage basin

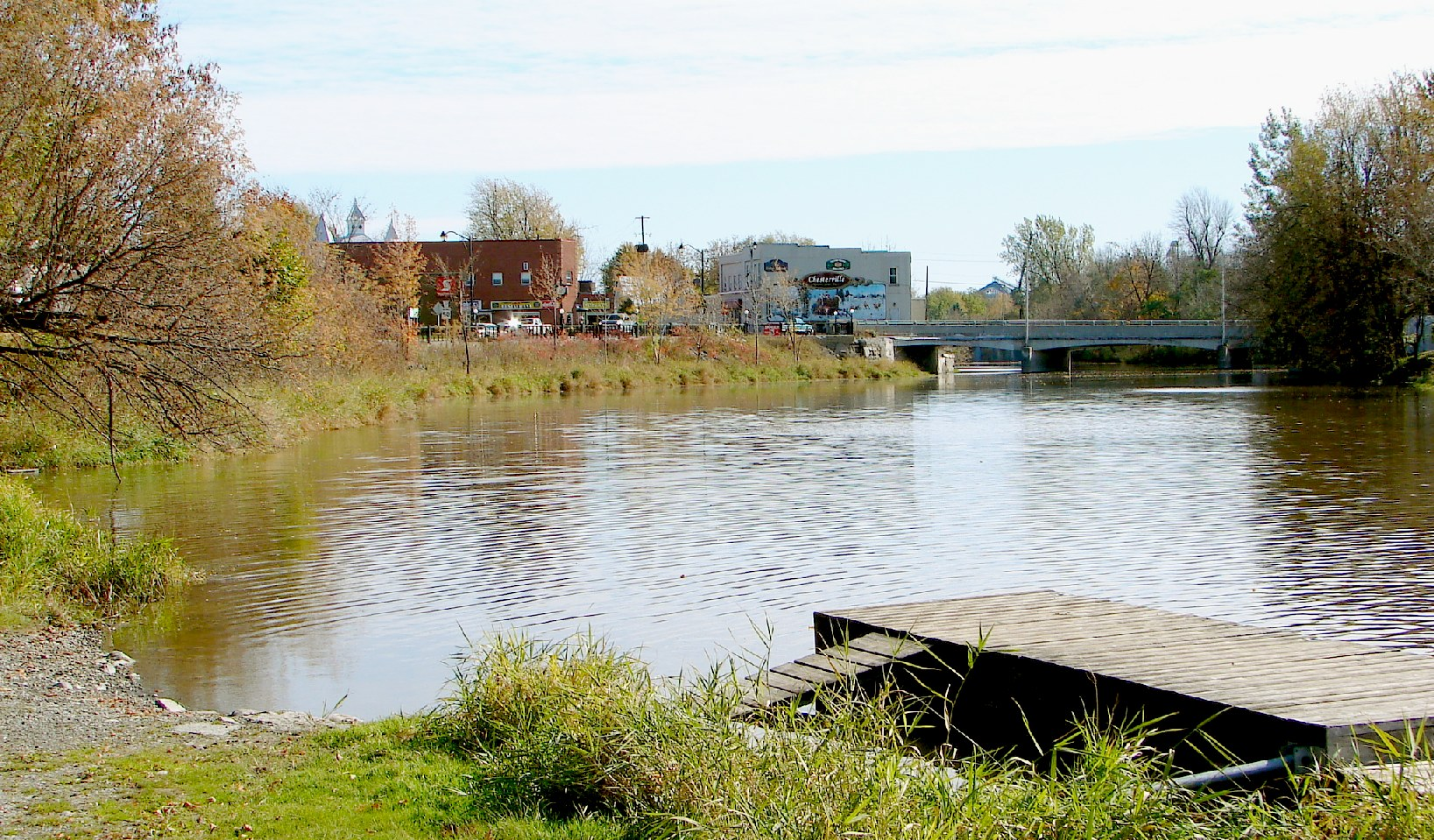
The South Nation River at Chesterville

The South Nation River is a river in Eastern Ontario, Canada. It springs from forests and marshes located north of Brockville, and it flows 175 kilometres (109 mi) northeast to empty into the Ottawa River north of Plantagenet. Its watershed covers 3,900 square kilometres (1,500 sq mi).

This river is called the "South Nation River" to distinguish it from a river in Quebec north of the Ottawa River called the Petite-Nation River or rivière Petite-Nation. The names of both rivers are derived from the French name for the native people of this area, the Weskarini.

The area surrounding the river, originally covered with white pine, is now mainly used for agriculture. The river drains an almost flat plain, and its lack of gradient makes it prone to flooding. Dams and other water control measures have been introduced to help reduce the impact of seasonal flooding in the watershed.

In some areas, the river flows through Leda clays which can be very unstable. Several landslides have occurred over the past century, including a major one near the former town of Lemieux on June 20, 1993. Approximately 3 million cubic metres (110,000,000 cu ft) of mud and clay slid into the river valley, blocking the river's flow for three days.

Four kilometers of river to the south of Spencerville is good for canoeing during most water conditions. There is a public boat launch at the old mill.

== Tributaries ==
(in downstream order)

- North Branch South Nation River
- Sandy Creek
- Payne River
- various branches of the Castor River
- Moose Creek
- Bear Brook
- Scotch River
- Caledonia Creek

== Communities ==
(in downstream order)

- Spencerville
- South Mountain
- Chesterville
- Crysler
- St. Albert
- Casselman
- Plantagenet

== See also ==
- List of Ontario rivers
