= Mer Bleue Bog =

National park in Ontario, Canada

- IUCN category II (national park)
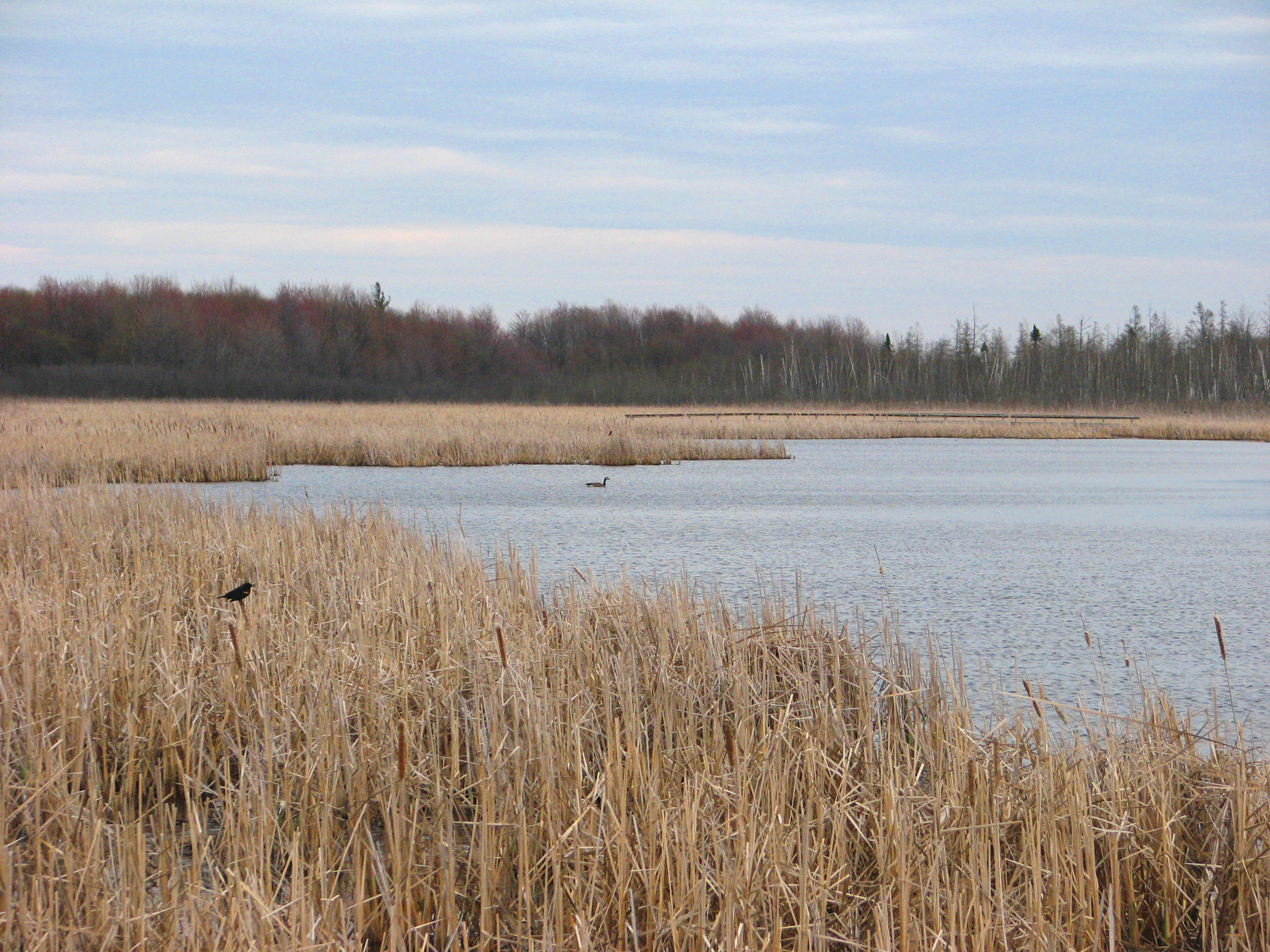
- Pond with part of boardwalk in background

- Location within Southern Ontario
- Location: Eastern Ontario, Canada
- Nearest city: Ottawa
- Coordinates: 45°24′N 75°30′W
- Area: 3,343 ha (12.91 sq mi)
- Established: Ramsar 5 Oct. 1995
- Governing body: National Capital Commission

Ramsar Wetland
- Official name: Mer Bleue Conservation Area
- Designated: 26 September 1995
- Reference no.: 755

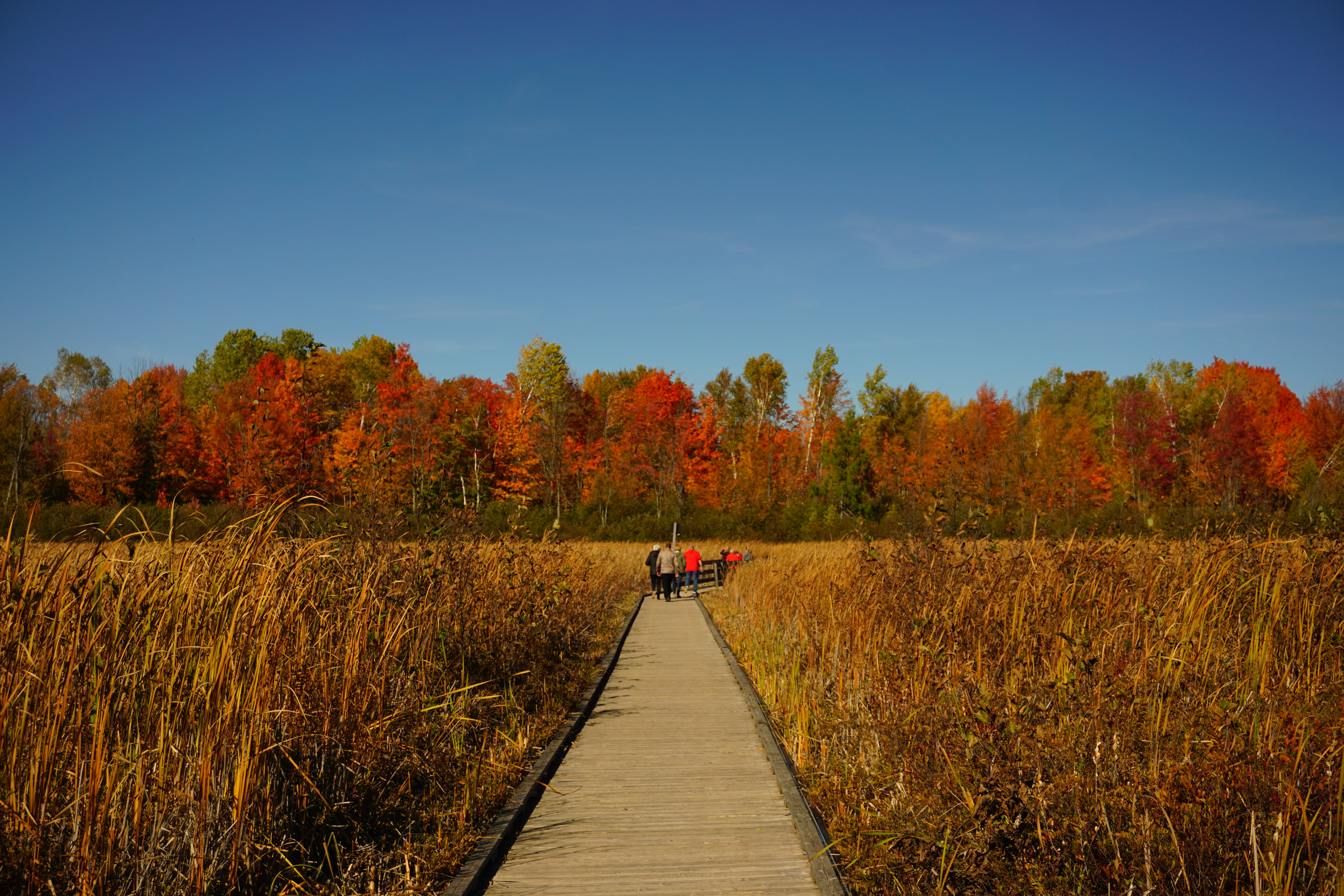
Mer Bleue Bog has a very popular autumn trail

Mer Bleue Bog is a 33.43 km^{2} (12.91 sq mi) protected area in Gloucester, Ontario, an eastern suburb of Ottawa in Eastern Ontario, Canada. Its main feature is a sphagnum bog that is situated in an ancient channel of the Ottawa River and is a remarkable boreal-like ecosystem normally not found this far south. Stunted black spruce, tamarack, bog rosemary, blueberry, and cottongrass are some of the unusual species that have adapted to the acidic waters of the bog.

The area provides habitat for many species, including beaver, muskrat, waterfowl, and the rare spotted turtle (Clemmys guttata). A 1.2 km (¾ mile) boardwalk allows visitors to explore a section of the bog. There are hiking trails that follow raised areas along the edges of the bog and cross-country skiing trails for use in winter. The conservation area is managed by the National Capital Commission.

The value of this unique wetland was not always recognized. During World War II, the Royal Canadian Air Force used this area for bombing practice. Now, this area has been designated as a Ramsar site, a Wetland of International Significance under the Ramsar Convention since October 1995, and an Area of Natural and Scientific Interest since 2011.

The name "Mer Bleue" (French, meaning "blue sea") is thought to describe the bog's appearance when it is covered in morning fog.

== History ==
Europeans began farming in the area surrounding the bog in the 1830s. Active exploitation of the bog itself occurred from the 1870 to the early 20th century and included activities such as logging, hunting, blueberry picking, farming, peat extraction, development for transportation/utility corridors, recreation, and scientific investigations.

In the mid-1950s, the federal government of Canada expropriated the farmland, making it part of Ottawa's Greenbelt. Today, the bog is reserved mainly for recreational and scientific purposes.

== Physical features ==
Mer Bleue is located in the western end of the southern melt water channel of the post-glacial Ottawa River (whereas the Alfred Bog formed at the eastern end of this channel). This channel was eroded into the floor of the Champlain Sea, which invaded the Ottawa Valley some 12 000 years ago. Bedrock topography consists of two north north-east/south south-west trending ridges. Surficial material consists of some glacial till, thick marine clay, and freshwater and deltaic deposits grading from coarse sand to clay. Peat deposits in the bog proper are up to 6 metres (20 ft) thick.

There are two sand ridges that extend from the west towards the center of the conservation area. These two parallel ridges divide the bog in three sections. The northern ridge (Dolman Ridge) used to have farms, which were expropriated in 1958 and subsequently removed, while the southern ridge (Borthwick Ridge) continues to have a few farms on it and provides access to the visitor boardwalk.

The hydrological features at this site are most unusual. Being a domed bog, water enters the bog mainly from natural precipitation creating oligotrophic conditions. The periphery of the bog is encircled by a mineral-enriched lagg that maintains a base water level for the bog. Drainage is poor due to underlying clay deposits as well as numerous beaver dams. Water eventually drains slowly both westward into Greens Creek and eastward into Bear Brook. However, water levels remain at or near the surface of the bog for most of the year. Saline ground-water sources are found under the organic overburden. A number of artificial ditches were dug in the bog for land reclamation or drainage of adjacent lands, however, most are no longer functioning efficiently due to the many beaver impoundments and gradual sedimentation that has occurred along their lengths.

== Ecological features ==
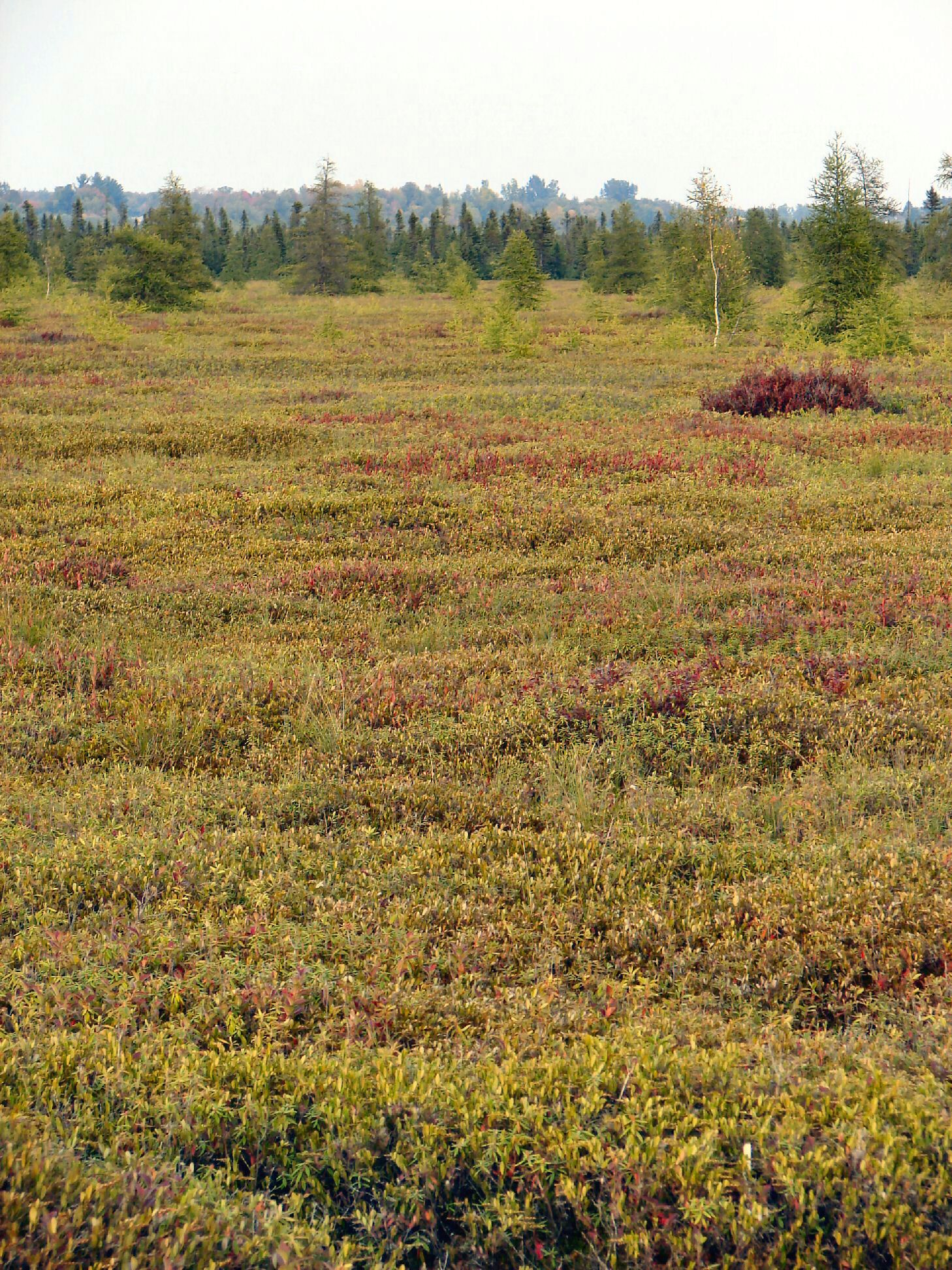
Mer Bleue is the site of peat bogs

Mer Bleue is a boreal peatland, a type of ecosystem that is usually found in the boreal forest to the north. The sphagnum bog contains two main types of vegetation—the black spruce forest and the open heath vegetation. The black spruce (Picea mariana) forest is dominated by black spruce with some growth of larch (Larix laricina), trembling white aspen (Populus tremuloides) and grey or white birch (Betula spp.).

Sphagnum mosses are the dominant low lying form of vegetation in the bog. About 12 species of heaths (members of the family Ericaceae) thrive in the bog. The most common are Labrador tea (Rhododendron groenlandicum), leatherleaf (Chamaedaphne spp.), small cranberry (Vaccinium oxycoccos), bog-laurel (Kalmia polifolia), and sheep-laurel (Kalmia angustifolia). At least nine species of orchids (family Orchidaceae) are found in Mer Bleue along with a variety of cottongrasses (Eriophorum spp.) and sedges (Carex spp.) in the family Cyperaceae.

The marsh areas around Mer Bleue are characterized by plants such as cattails (Typha latifolia), alders (Alnus rugosa), willows (Salix spp.), and a variety of sedges (Carex spp.). There are several aspen islands in the centre of Mer Bleue consisting of an overstory of aspen and an understory dominated by bracken fern (Pteridium spp.). The edges of the islands are surrounded by small bands of cattail and some alder growth.

The ridges of the site extend from the center of the conservation area westwards. There is a wide mixture in the vegetation from early succession poplars and shrubs to some very large mature specimens of white pine, maple, and ash. A section of this area includes a variety of hard and softwood plantations established by the Canadian Forest Service.

== Hydrological values ==
Mer Bleue drains both westward into Green's Creek and eastward into Bear Brook. Drainage was formerly through small creeks, which now have been modified through a series of ditches dug in the late 19th century. These ditches are no longer functioning efficiently due to the many beaver ponds, which started up in the late 1950s. As in a typical bog, the water level is at or near the surface for most of the year. Much of the bog is surrounded by the "lagg" that is basically a moat of standing or slow flowing water found between the outer perimeter of the bog and the land. Flooding is controlled naturally through beaver dams and the ability of sphagnum to absorb large amounts of water.

The bog receives most of its water in the form of atmospheric precipitation. Flow velocities of ground and surface waters are very low given the impermeability of the underlying clay soils, the absorption qualities of sphagnum and the presence of numerous beaver dams. Shoreline stabilization is not a significant concern as the impact of water on the ridges is minimal and most of the land is relatively flat.

== Flora ==
=== Regionally significant vegetation ===
- Beech-maple forests (upland tolerant deciduous forest) rare in Ottawa-Carleton region
- Swampy forests of maple, cedar, and hemlock (lowland tolerant forests) are regionally significant
- Black spruce-larch forests (lowland intolerant coniferous forests), rare in the Ottawa district
- Open bog, low-shrub bog, and treed bog are highly significant within an Ottawa District and Southern Ontario context
- Bog pool is regionally significant

=== Nationally significant flora ===
- Porsild's cottongrass (Eriophorum x porsildii, a hybrid of E. vaginatum and E. chamissonis), Cyperaceae
- Southern twayblade (Listera australis), Orchidaceae
- Torrey's manna grass (Torreyochloa pallida), Poaceae

=== Provincially significant flora ===
- Black-berried highbush blueberry (Vaccinium corymbosum)
- Downy goldenrod (Solidago puberula)
- Drooping manna grass (Glyceria x laxa)
- Folliculata sedge (Carex folliculata)
- Greene's rush (Juncus greenei)
- Ground pine (Lycopodium obscurum)
- Hayden's sedge (Carex haydenii)
- Heart-leaved tearthumb (Polygonum arifolium)
- Large purple-fringed orchid (Habenaria fimbriata)
- Long manna grass (Glyceria melicaria)
- Marsh dandelion (Taraxacum palustre)
- New England sedge (Carex novae-angliae)
- Seaside dock (Rumex maritimus)
- Slashed avens (Geum laciniatum)
- Twin-scapped bladderwort (Utricularia geminiscapa)
- White-fringed orchid (Platanthera blephariglottis)

=== Southern Ontario significant flora ===
- Alpine cottongrass (Scirpus hudsonianus)
- Fernald's sedge (Carex merritt-fernaldii)
- Flat-topped hawkweed (Hieracium umbellatum)
- Prostrate sedge (Carex chordorrhiza)
- Small bur-reed (Sparganium minimum)
- Sticky everlasting (Gnaphalium viscosum)

== Fauna ==
The bog has a number of significant fauna because of its relatively undisturbed natural habitat and its uniqueness in representing a boreal habitat which is normally found much farther north.

Here is a list of mammal species that are present in or around Mer Bleue. Aquatic furbearers such as beaver (Castor canadensis), muskrat (Ondatra zibethicus), and mink (Neogale vison) live in the surrounding marshes. It is also home to: woodchuck (marmot), raccoon, skunk, porcupine, vole, mole, squirrel (red, grey/black), chipmunk, weasel, cottontail hare, snowshoe hare, moose, white-tailed deer, red fox, coyote, and black bear. Rare species include the spotfin shiner (Cyprinella spiloptera), the beetles Stenolophus magnacephalus and Agonum darlingtoni, and the spotted turtle (Clemmys guttata).

Mer Bleue is the easternmost breeding location of the eastern subspecies of Palm warbler, sometimes called the Yellow Palm Warbler.

== See also ==
- Greenbelt (Ottawa)
- List of Ramsar wetlands of international importance
