= Alfred and Plantagenet =

Township in Ontario, Canada

- Township (lower-tier)
- Township of Alfred and Plantagenet; Canton d'Alfred et Plantagenet
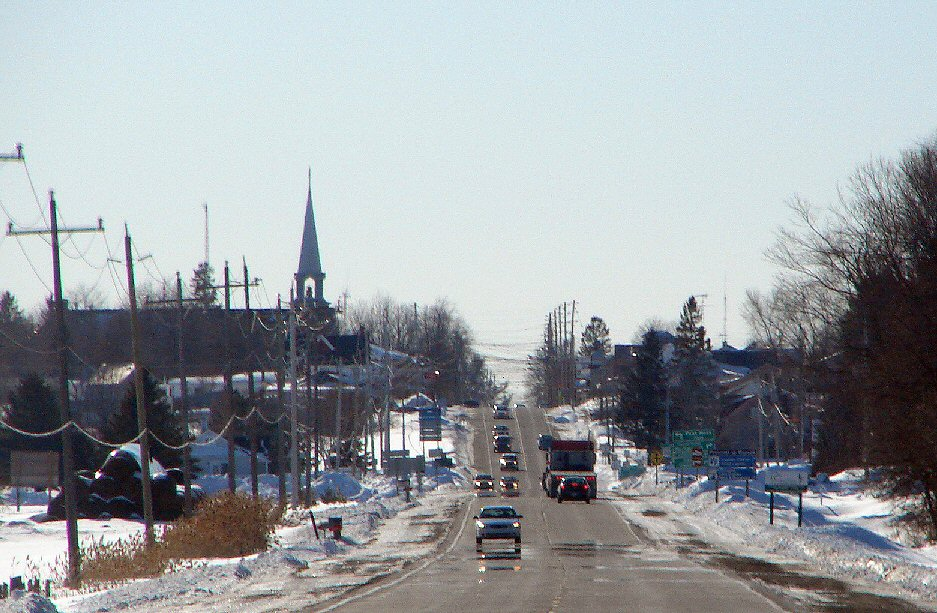

- Location within United Counties of Prescott and Russell Location within Southern Ontario
- Coordinates: 45°34′N 74°55′W
- Country: Canada
- Provinces: Ontario
- County: Prescott and Russell
- Settled: 1810s
- Formed: January 1, 1997

Government
  - Mayor: Yves Laviolette
  - Federal riding: Prescott—Russell—Cumberland
  - Prov. riding: Glengarry—Prescott—Russell

Area
  - Land: 391.79 km^{2} (151.27 sq mi)

Population (2021)
  - Total: 9,949
  - Density: 25.4/km^{2} (66/sq mi)
- Time zone: UTC-5 (EST)
  - Summer (DST): UTC-4 (EDT)
- Postal Code FSA: K0B
- Area codes: 613, 343, 753
- Website: www.alfred-plantagenet.com

Alfred and Plantagenet is a Franco-Ontarian township in eastern Ontario, Canada, in the United Counties of Prescott and Russell. Located approximately 70 kilometres (43 mi) from downtown Ottawa at the confluence of the Ottawa River and the South Nation River.

The township was formed on January 1, 1997, through the amalgamation of the townships of Alfred and North Plantagenet and the villages of Alfred and Plantagenet.

Plantagenet is named after the House of Plantagenet, the royal house established by King Henry II. The township was settled in 1811-12, and its post office opened in 1838.

Near the town of Alfred, the Ontario Ministry of Natural Resources has designated the Alfred Bog as "a provincially significant wetland and an Area of Natural and Scientific Interest." Species of interest include the palm warbler, northern pitcher-plant, pink lady's-slipper, cottongrass, bog elfin and bog copper butterflies, and ebony boghaunter dragonfly. It also hosts one of the most southerly herds of moose. The bog is open to the public with a 272-metre (892 ft) boardwalk for nature walks.

University of Guelph-Ontario Agricultural College's Alfred College was located here until 2015.

== Communities ==
The township comprises the communities of Alfred, Alfred Station, Blue Corners, Centrefield, Coin Gratton, Curran, Glenburn, Jessups Falls, Lefaivre, Pendleton, Plantagenet, Plantagenet Station, Rockdale, Senecal, The Rollway, Treadwell, Wendover, and Westminster. The township administrative offices are located in Plantagenet.

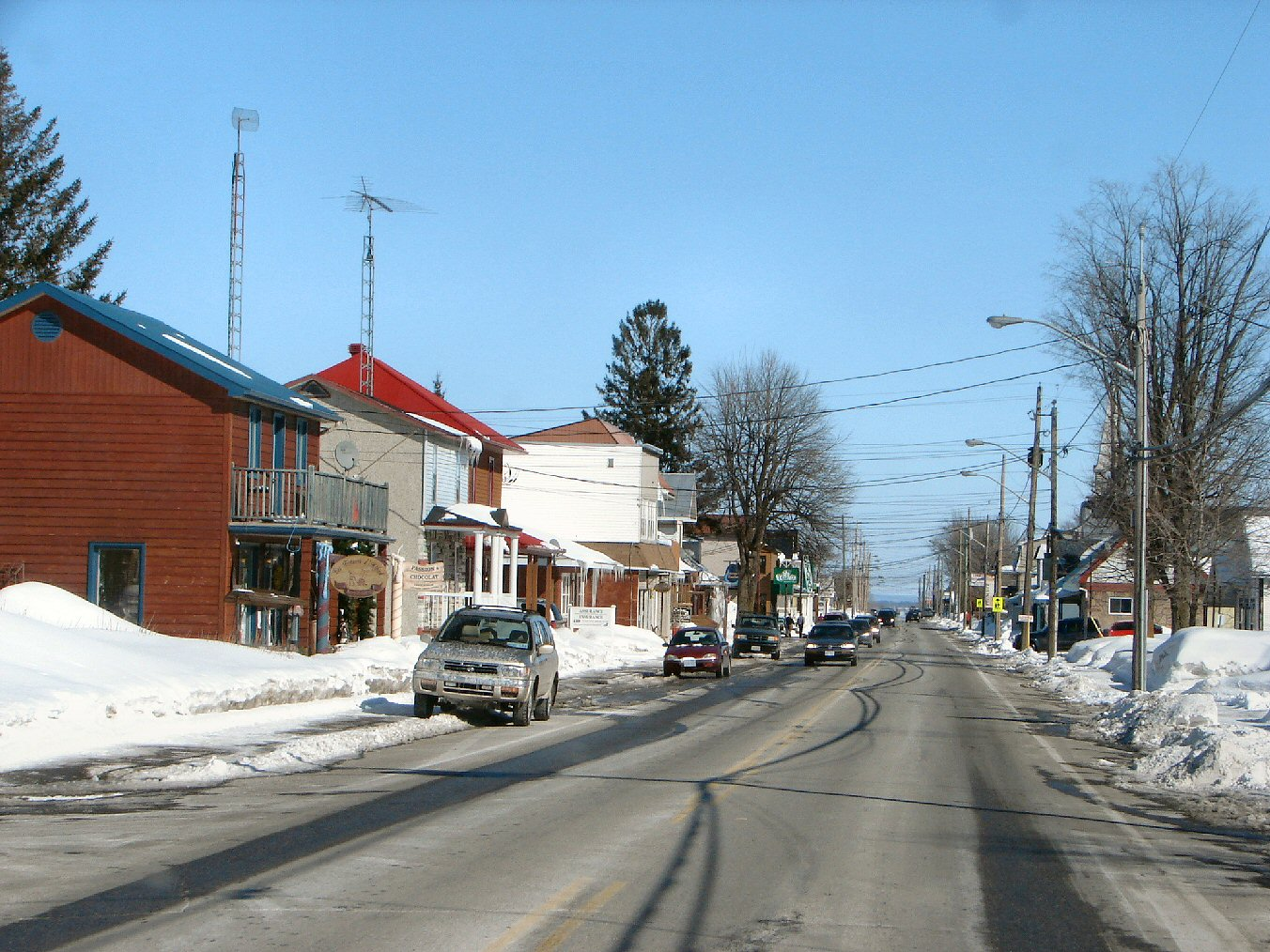
Main street in Alfred

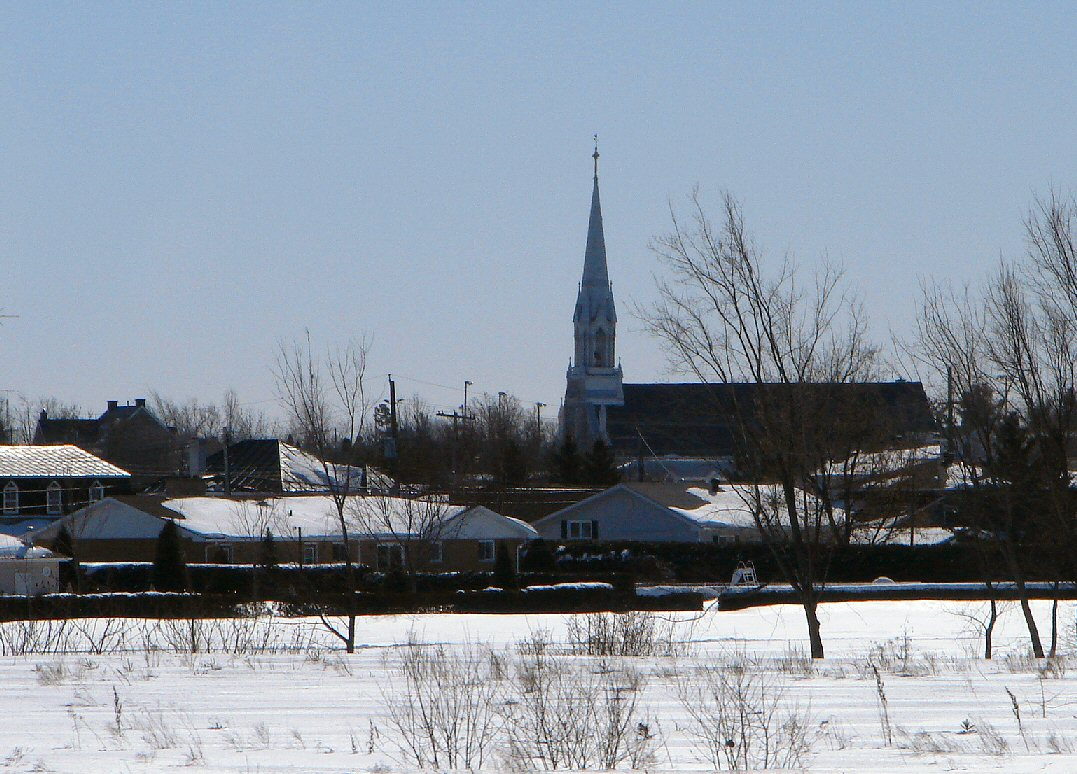
Skyline of Plantagenet

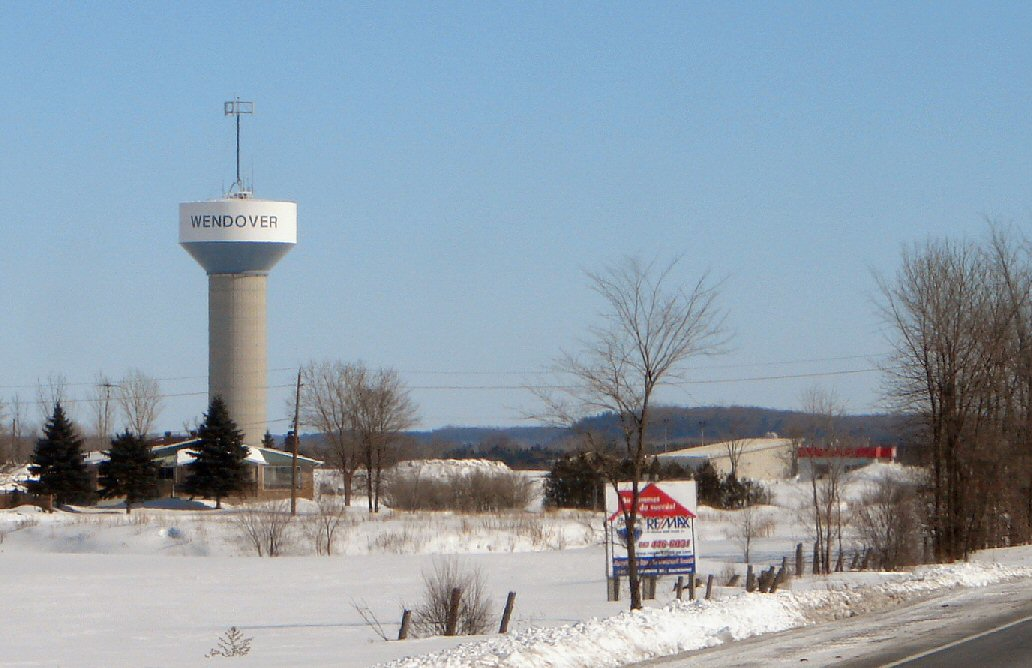
Wendover

== Demographics ==
In the 2021 Census of Population conducted by Statistics Canada, Alfred and Plantagenet had a population of 9,949 living in 4,080 of its 4,297 total private dwellings, a change of 2.8% from its 2016 population of 9,680. With a land area of 391.79 km^{2} (151.27 sq mi), it had a population density of 25.4/km^{2} (65.8/sq mi) in 2021.

Canada census – Alfred and Plantagenet community profile

	2021	2016	2011
Population	9,949 (+2.8% from 2016)	9,680 (+5.3% from 2011)	9,196 (+6.3% from 2006)
Land area	391.79 km^{2} (151.27 sq mi)	392.31 km^{2} (151.47 sq mi)	392.45 km^{2} (151.53 sq mi)
Population density	25.4/km^{2} (66/sq mi)	24.7/km^{2} (64/sq mi)	23.4/km^{2} (61/sq mi)
Median age	46.4 (M: 46.4, F: 46.8)	46.6 (M: 46.2, F: 47.0)
Private dwellings	4,297 (total) 4,080 (occupied)	4,218 (total)	3,922 (total)
Median household income	$85,000	$70,873

References: 2021 2016 2011

Historical census populations – Alfred and Plantagenet
Year	Pop.	±%
2001	8,593	—
2006	8,654	+0.7%
2011	9,196	+6.3%
2016	9,680	+5.3%
2021	9,949	+2.8%
Source: Statistics Canada

== Attractions ==
Alfred is home to the Canadian Pinball Museum, which preserves approximately 70 machines.

== See also ==
- List of municipalities in Ontario
- List of townships in Ontario
- List of francophone communities in Ontario
