= Saint-Jean-Vianney =

Village in Québec, Canada

Coordinates: 48°28′22″N 71°13′11″W

Saint-Jean-Vianney

Saint-Jean-Vianney (French pronunciation: [sɛ̃ ʒɑ̃ vjanɛ]) was a village in the Saguenay-Lac-Saint-Jean region of Quebec, which was abandoned after it was partially destroyed in a landslide on May 4, 1971.

== History ==
Saint-Jean-Vianney was originally created as a parish municipality in 1935, and became a village on December 29, 1951. By 1971, the village had a population of 1,266.

== Landslide ==
Located near the shore of the Saguenay River, Saint-Jean-Vianney was — unbeknownst to residents at the time — built atop a bed of unstable Leda clay, a type of subsoil which can liquefy under stress.

Following unusually heavy rains in April 1971, the clay soil bed at Saint-Jean-Vianney became saturated with water that had failed to run off, causing pockets of clay to gradually dissolve. Over the few weeks leading up to the landslide, cracks were reported in some of the town's streets and driveways, some house foundations dropped roughly six to eight inches (15 to 20 cm) into the soil, and some unusual noises — including underground thumps and an untraceable sound of running water — were reported.

At 10:45 p.m. on May 4, the earth at Saint-Jean-Vianney suddenly dropped approximately 100 ft (30 m), forming a canyon through which a river of liquefied clay flowed toward the Shipshaw River below, swallowing houses in its path. Just before midnight, the clay finally stopped flowing and began to resolidify. By the time the landslide had ended, 41 homes had been destroyed and 31 people had been killed.

The landslide created a crater of approximately 324,000 square metres (3,490,000 sq ft) in area, varying from 15 m (49 ft) to 30 m (98 ft) in depth.

== Aftermath ==
The Saint-Jean-Vianney site was subsequently declared unsafe for habitation, and over the next six months the survivors were resettled at Arvida. Through various municipal amalgamations, both the landslide site and Arvida are now within the municipal boundaries of Saguenay.

Subsequent research into the slide revealed that Saint-Jean-Vianney was in fact built directly atop the site of another landslide approximately 500 years earlier, long before any settlement had ever taken place in the area.

The site of Saint-Jean-Vianney remains uninhabited today, although a small park near Shipshaw and a museum exhibit at Saguenay's Place du Presbytère commemorate the event. Place du Presbytère also includes an exhibit dedicated to the Saguenay Flood of 1996.

== See also ==
- Lemieux, Ontario, where a disaster was averted by resettling the town two years prior to a similar landslide
- List of former municipalities in Quebec
