= Limoges, Ontario =

Limoges
- Unincorporated community
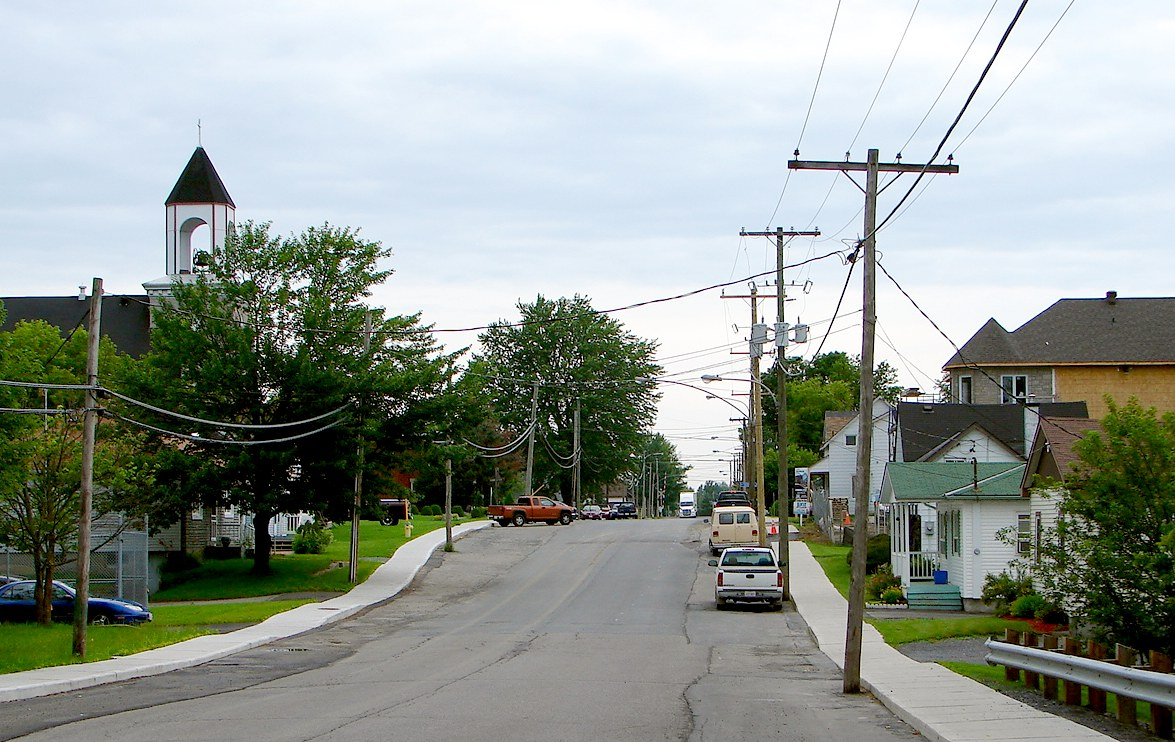

- Location within Southern Ontario
- Coordinates: 45°20′N 75°15′W
- Country: Canada
- Province: Ontario
- County: Prescott and Russell
- Municipalities: The Nation, Russell

Area
  - Land: 1.22 km^{2} (0.47 sq mi)

Population (2021)
  - Total: 2,213
  - Density: 1,807.3/km^{2} (4,681/sq mi)
- Time zone: UTC-5 (Eastern (EST))
  - Summer (DST): UTC-4 (EDT)
- Postal code FSA: K0A
- Area code(s): 613
- GNBC Code: FBXRS

Limoges, Ontario is a town located in the United Counties of Prescott and Russell, Ontario, Canada, approximately 35 kilometres (22 mi) east of Ottawa and is home to Calypso Park, Canada's largest water park. The east and north sides of the community are located in the township of the Nation, while the west side of the community is located in the township of Russell.

== Demographics ==
According to the 2016 Canadian census, Limoges had a population of 2,048, an increase of 18.9% over its population in 2011.

In the 2021 Canadian census, Limoges had a population of 2,213, an increase of 8.1% over its 2016 population.

Historical census populations – Limoges, Ontario
Year	Pop.	±%
2011	1,723	—
2016	2,048	+18.9%
2021	2,213	+8.1%
Source: Statistics Canada

== Economy ==
Limoges is home to Calypso Park, Canada's largest theme waterpark, Limoges Self Storage, Oasis Mini Golf, and Kittawa, a camping site. The local economy is very limited, with only a few amenities. Most citizens visit nearby Embrun or Casselman for their groceries and larger purchases; the only place in Limoges to buy groceries is a "dépanneur"-style convenience/general store.

== Transportation ==
Limoges is north of Exit 79 on Trans-Canada Highway 417. The community is situated between the towns of Casselman and Embrun and close to Larose Forest. Limoges Road serves as the main road for the village.

== See also ==
- Limoges Road
- The Nation, Ontario
