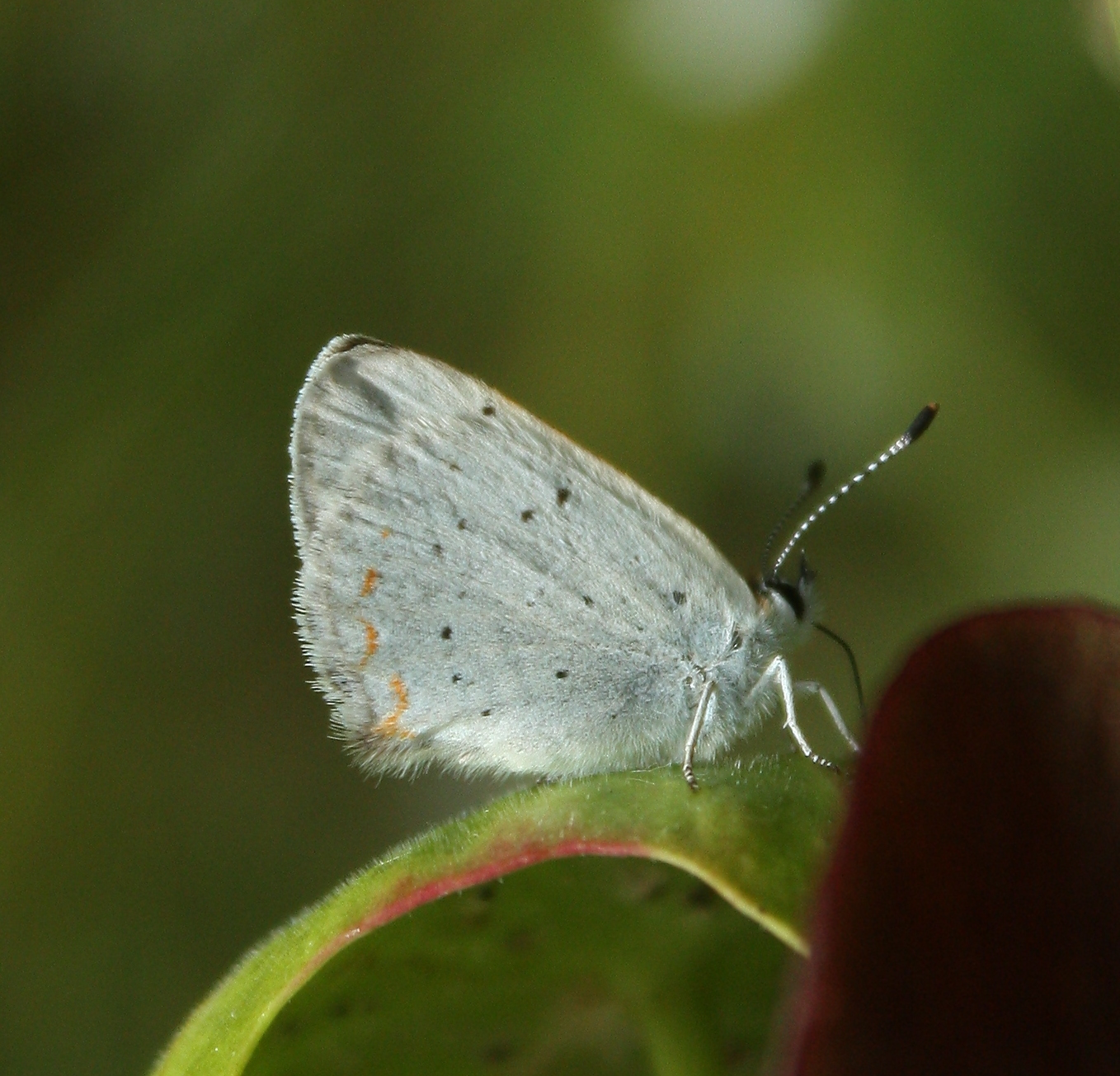
- Saint-Narcisse-de-Rimouski, Québec
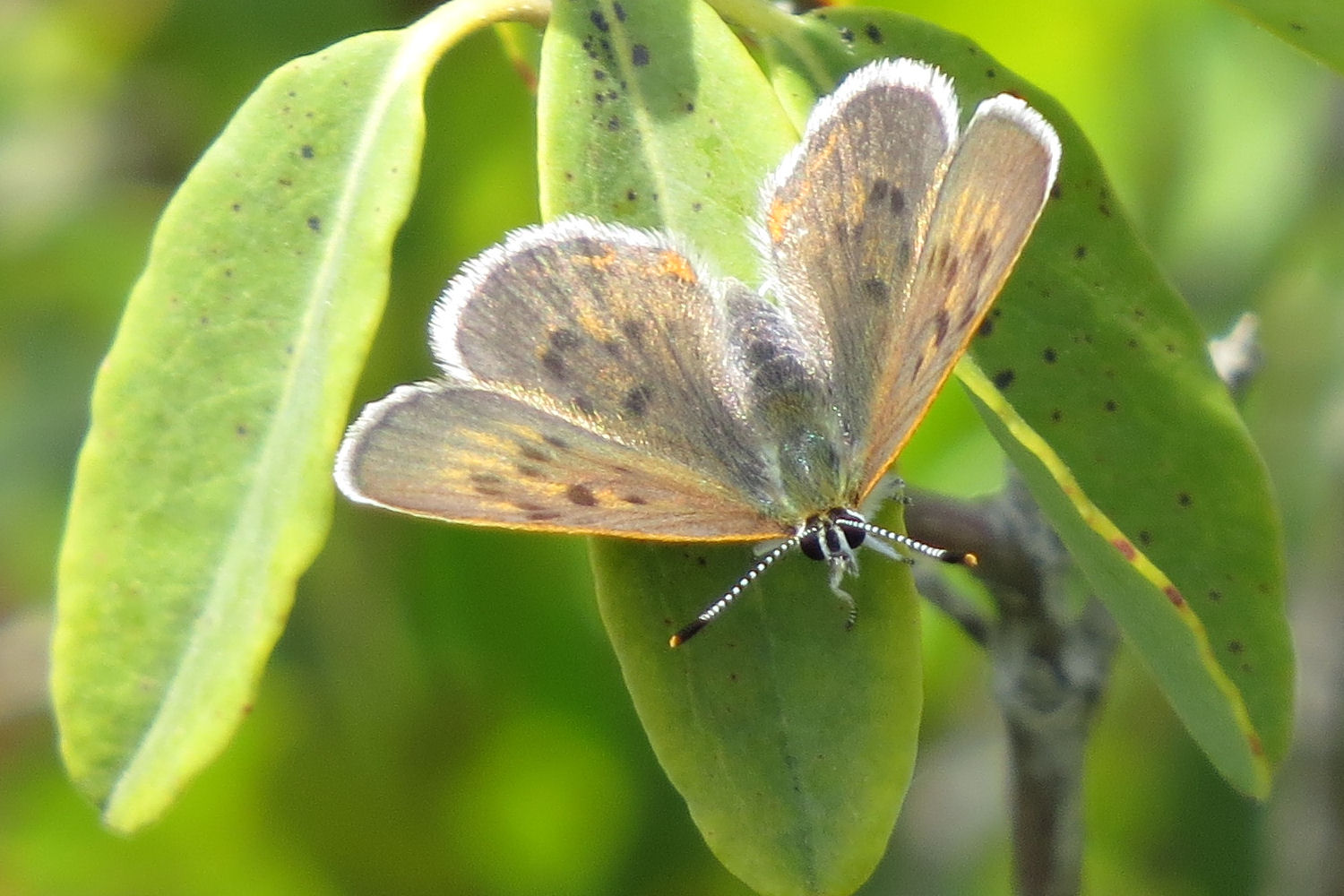
- Female, Mer Bleue Conservation Area, Ottawa, Ontario

Conservation status
- Apparently Secure (NatureServe)

Scientific classification
- Domain: Eukaryota
- Kingdom: Animalia
- Phylum: Arthropoda
- Class: Insecta
- Order: Lepidoptera
- Family: Lycaenidae
- Genus: Lycaena
- Subgenus: Epidemia
- Species: L. epixanthe

Binomial name
- Lycaena epixanthe (Boisduval & Le Conte, [1835])
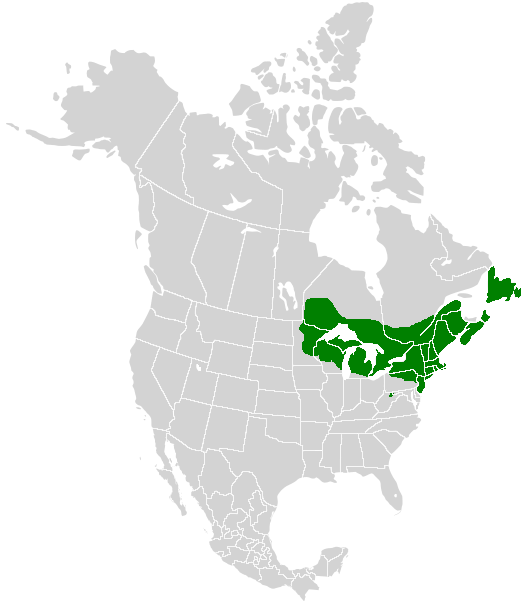

Synonyms
- Epidemia epixanthe

= Lycaena epixanthe =

Species of butterfly

Lycaena epixanthe, also known as the bog copper or cranberry-bog copper, is a North American species of butterfly in the family Lycaenidae. Adults like to sip drops of dew clinging to leaves and almost exclusively nectar on their host plant, cranberries. Because of this, bog coppers will spend their entire lives within the area of a single acid bog. Even though their flight is weak and close to the ground, bog coppers are hard to catch because of the habitat in which they live. Also, 85% of the bog coppers life span is spent in the egg. It is listed as a species of special concern in the US state of Connecticut.

== Description ==
The bog copper is the smallest North American copper. The upper side of the males wings is dark gray-brown with a purplish sheen (it glows under UV light very strongly). The male has very few black basal spots on the fore wing. The hind wing outer margin has orange markings. The upper side of the females wings is very similar to the males except the female has a lighter purplish iridescence. The underside of the wings in both sexes varies from whitish-gray to yellowish-tan. The wingspan measures 2.2–2.5 cm (0.87–0.98 in).

== Similar species ==
Similar species in the bog copper's range include the purplish copper (Lycaena helloides) and the dorcas copper (Lycaena dorcas). Another butterfly that is similar to the Lycaena epixanthe is the Lycaena hetereonea, except the blue color is on the upper side and the brown color is on the underside of the wing.

The purplish copper is larger, the female has a lot of orange on the upper side, and both sexes have a conspicuous orange submarginal line on the upper side of the hind wing.

The dorcas is larger, the male has more black spots on the upper side, the female has more orange on the upper side, and the underside of the wings is pinkish-brown or tan with a red-orange hind wing submarginal line.

== Habitat ==
The only habitat in which bog coppers occur are acid bogs with cranberries. Thus conservation of acid bog habitats is essential for this butterfly.

== Flight ==
This species is on the wing mostly from late June to early August (mid-June to mid-July near Ottawa, mid-June to early July in New Jersey, and mid-June to mid-August in Maine).

== Life cycle ==
Males perch on low foliage (usually cranberry) all day from 10:00 A.M. to 6:00 P.M. to await females. If a male sees a female passing by, he will pursue her. When she lands, the male will land behind her, vibrate his wings, and then they will mate. If the female has already mated or does not want to mate, she will vibrate her wings and then the male will leave. Females lay their eggs singly on the underside of host plant leaves a few inches above the bog surface. The whitish egg can withstand flooding. The larva is bluish-green with a darker green middorsal stripe. The bog copper larva is the only copper that feeds on cranberries. The chrysalis is pale yellow-green to green with brown and white markings. Rarely, the chrysalis can be solid dark purple. The egg overwinters, usually under water with the larva fully developed inside. It has 1 brood per year.

== Food plants ==
The larvae feed upon shrubby cranberries in the heath family (Ericaceae). Here is a list of host plants used by the bog copper:

- Large cranberry, Vaccinium macrocarpon
- Small cranberry, Vaccinium oxycoccos

The adults feed on water and nectar from cranberry flowers.
