= Lemieux, Ontario =

Ghost town in Ontario, Canada

Coordinates: 45°23′43″N 75°03′33″W

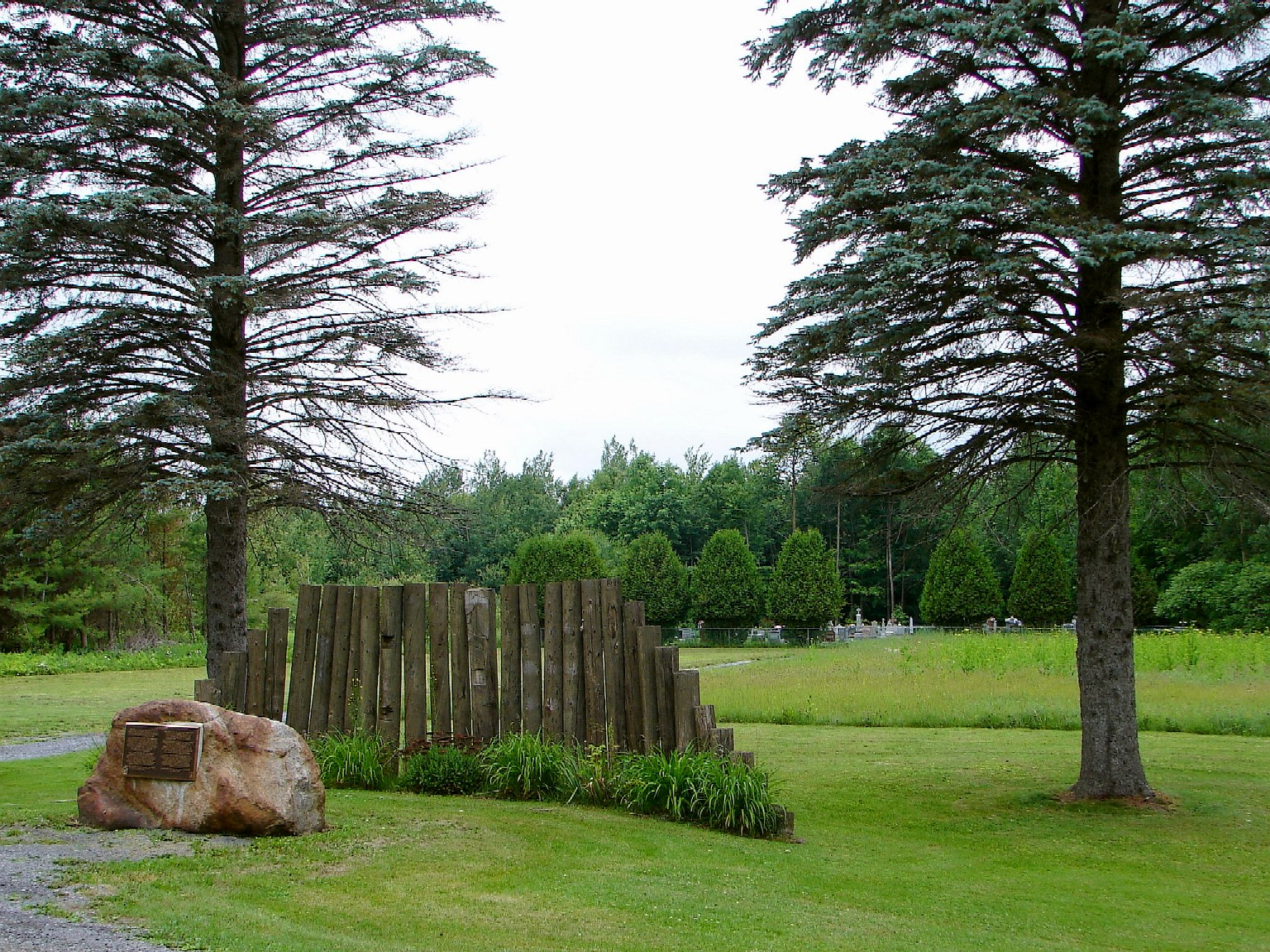
Memorial and old graveyard of Lemieux in the background

Lemieux is a ghost town in the Canadian province of Ontario, which was located on the shore of the South Nation River in the Prescott and Russell County township of South Plantagenet. The community was abandoned over a two-year period from 1989 to 1991, after soil testing revealed that the town was built on unstable Leda clay, a type of subsoil which can liquefy under stress, and was consequently in danger of experiencing a landslide similar to the one that destroyed the town of Saint-Jean-Vianney, Quebec in 1971.

The decision to relocate the community's residents was prudent - on June 20, 1993, two years after the last remaining building at Lemieux was demolished, a landslide occurred on a farm very close to the edge of the former townsite.

== History ==
Lemieux, a predominantly Franco-Ontarian settlement, was first established in 1850 as a mill town for lumber operations in the area, and later evolved into a farming community. A Roman Catholic parish church, Saint-Joseph-de-Lemieux, was established in 1891.

In 1910, locals documented a small landslide, which occurred on the Nation River just west of Lemieux. Years later, on May 16, 1971, just 12 days after the Saint-Jean-Vianney disaster, a small landslide occurred on the South Nation River 4.5 km (3 mi) upstream from Lemieux. As a result, the South Nation Conservation Authority began a program of soil testing along the river to identify sites at risk. In 1989, Lemieux was identified as a risk site, and after consultations with the township, the provincial Ministry of Natural Resources and the local residents, it was decided to relocate the residents to a safer area. Over the next two years, the residents were relocated to existing nearby communities at provincial government expense.

Buildings in the community were either relocated or demolished. After selling their properties and buildings to the government, many of the townspeople moved their structures to what were deemed as safe zones, not far from the original town. The last building remaining in Lemieux, the Saint-Joseph church, was demolished on August 4, 1991. Only the parish cemetery remains at the former town site.

== Landslide ==
On June 20, 1993, two years after Lemieux was abandoned, heavy rains caused a retrogressive earthflow which destroyed 17 hectares of farmland at the edge of the town site. The scarp retreated 680 m (2,230 ft) from the riverbank in less than an hour and left a crater some 320 meters (1,050 ft) wide and 18 m (59 ft) deep. An estimated 2.8 to 3.5 million cubic metres of sand, silt and liquefied clay collapsed into the river, damming it for 3.3 kilometres (2.1 mi) for several days.

A portion of Prescott and Russell County Road 16, beyond the outskirts of the original town, was consumed by the landslide with the balance being farmland. The event occurred well beyond where the town buildings and houses had once stood.

== The Bradley Family Farm ==
At the epicentre of the landslide a family farm once stood, which had been owned by John Bradley and his wife Eleanor. Although this event is referred to as the Lemieux Landslide, it is somewhat of a misnomer in that it actually occurred just beyond the edge of where the town once was, on Prescott County farmland and roadway. Bradley had owned farm land on either side of the landslide and to the Nation River's edge with the exception of the very tip of the landslide, which had dislodged a relatively short section of Prescott and Russell County Road 16.

Locals had noted over the years how strange it was that parts of Bradley's fields often remained wet during the summer months. John Bradley, who had served on the Prescott County Township Council for 22 years, lived through many months of wrangling regarding the government's proposed purchase of the land including the farm, which had been with his family for 100 years. In particular, the prospect of closing and dismantling the St. Joseph Church was a real heart break for Bradley and the community. He died at age 92 just before the final phase had taken place and was spared of the transaction as well as seeing the middle half of his farm slide into the Nation River.

== Aftermath ==
Direct and indirect costs related to the event were estimated at C$12.5 million.

The South Nation Conservation Authority began a revegetation program in 1994, seeding the landslide site with grasses, legumes and 7,600 trees to help stabilize the soil and reclaim the landslide scar as a wildlife habitat.

The government of Ontario erected a historical plaque at the site of Lemieux's former main street.
