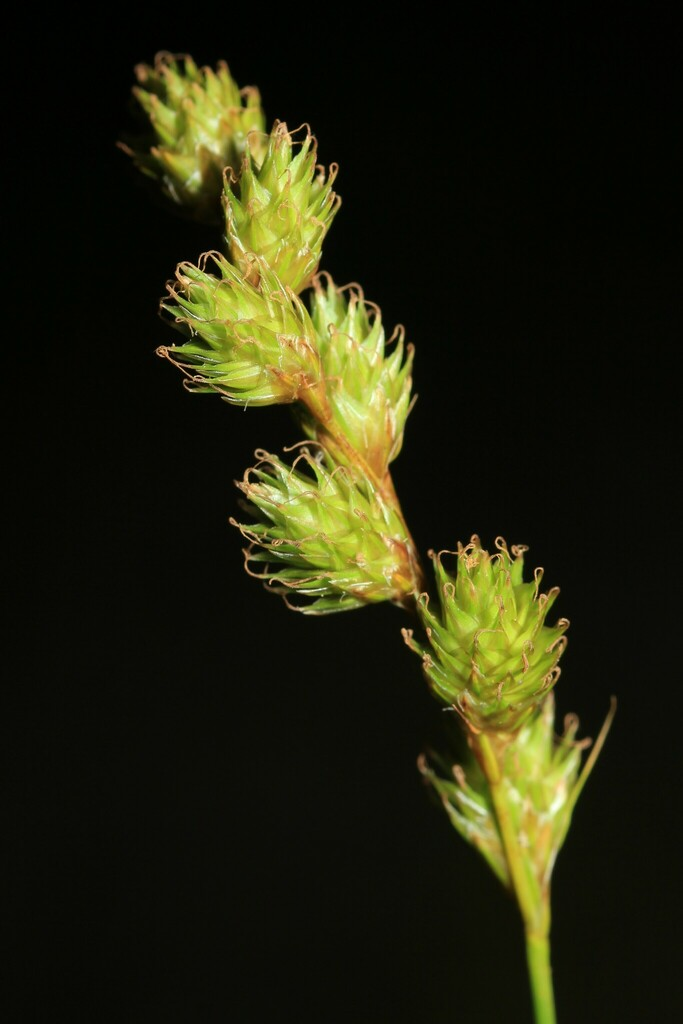

Scientific classification
- Kingdom: Plantae
- Clade: Tracheophytes
- Clade: Angiosperms
- Clade: Monocots
- Clade: Commelinids
- Order: Poales
- Family: Cyperaceae
- Genus: Carex
- Subgenus: Carex subg. Vignea
- Section: Carex sect. Ovales
- Species: C. merritt-fernaldii

Binomial name
- Carex merritt-fernaldii Mack.
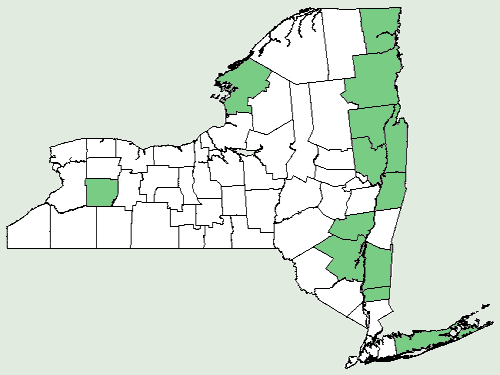
- Distribution in New York

= Carex merritt-fernaldii =

Species of grass-like plant

Carex merritt-fernaldii, or Fernald's sedge, is a species of sedge from northeastern North America. It was first described by Kenneth Mackenzie in 1923. It is named after botanist Merritt Fernald.

This species can be found in a variety of places, such as cliffs, balds, ledges, meadows and fields, and woodlands, as well as anthropogenic surroundings. It is a perennial that has two types of stems - some with flower/fruit clusters (spikes) at their summits, known as reproductive stems, and others that lack spikes, known as vegetative stems. Stems are triangular. Its habitat is sandy or rocky acidic sterile soils, but it can also be found in drying peat blogs.
