= The Nation, Ontario =

The Nation La Nation
- Municipality (lower-tier)
- The Nation Municipality; Municipalité de La Nation
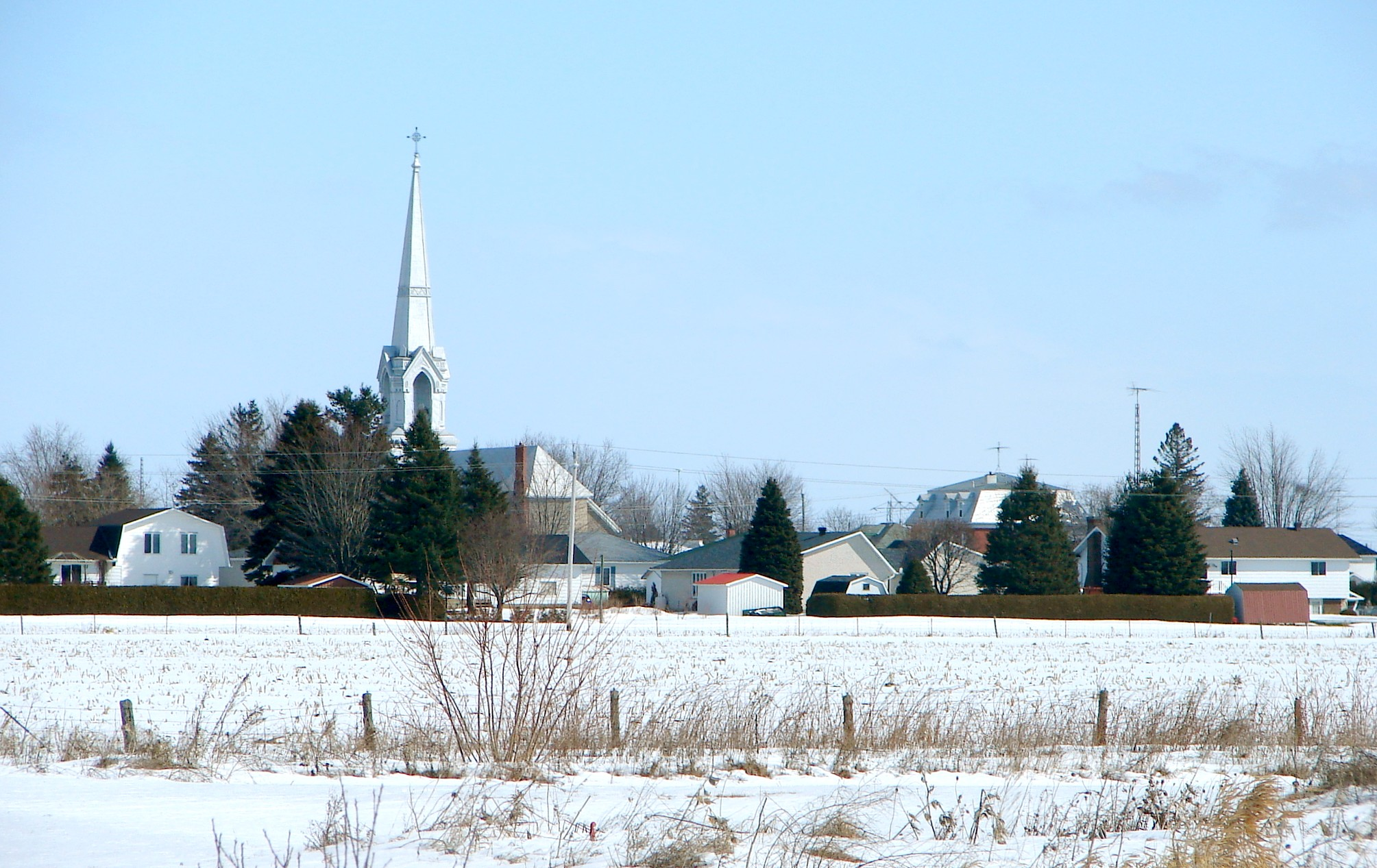
- St. Isidore

- Location within United Counties of Prescott and Russell Location within Southern Ontario
- Coordinates: 45°21′00″N 75°02′00″W
- Country: Canada
- Province: Ontario
- County: Prescott and Russell
- Incorporated: 1998

Government
  - Type: Township
  - Mayor: Francis Brière
  - Fed. riding: Prescott—Russell—Cumberland
  - Prov. riding: Glengarry—Prescott—Russell

Area
  - Total: 658.93 km^{2} (254.41 sq mi)

Population (2021)
  - Total: 13,350
  - Density: 20.3/km^{2} (53/sq mi)
- Time zone: UTC−05:00 (EST)
  - Summer (DST): UTC−04:00 (EDT)
- Postal code: K0A, K0B
- Area code: 613
- Website: www.nationmun.ca

The Nation (La Nation in French) is a municipality in Eastern Ontario, located within Canada's National Capital Region, in the United Counties of Prescott and Russell. The municipality was formed on January 1, 1998, through the amalgamation of the former townships of Caledonia, Cambridge, and South Plantagenet, as well as the Village of St. Isidore.

The municipality is crossed by the South Nation River after which the municipality was named.

== Communities ==
The township comprises the communities of:

- Benoit
- Bradley Creek
- Caledonia Springs
- Fenaghvale
- Forest Park
- Fournier
- Franklins Corners
- Gagnon
- Johnsons Ferry
- Lalonde
- Limoges
- Longtinville
- Martels Corners
- Mayerville
- Parkers Corners
- Proulx
- Riceville
- Routhier
- Sandown
- Skye
- St. Albert
- St. Amour
- St. Bernardin
- Ste-Rose-de-Prescott
- St. Isidore
- Velfranc

The township administrative offices are located north of Casselman on Route 500, with a satellite office in Fournier.

The ghost town of Lemieux, abandoned in the early 1990s, is also located within the municipality.

== Demographics ==
In the 2021 Census of Population conducted by Statistics Canada, The Nation had a population of 13,350 living in 5,104 of its 5,259 total private dwellings, a change of 4.2% from its 2016 population of 12,808. With a land area of 658.93 km^{2} (254.41 sq mi), it had a population density of 20.3/km^{2} (52.5/sq mi) in 2021.

Canada census – The Nation, Ontario community profile

	2021	2016	2011
Population	13,350 (+4.2% from 2016)	12,808 (+9.8% from 2011)	11,668 (+9.4% from 2006)
Land area	658.93 km^{2} (254.41 sq mi)	658.32 km^{2} (254.18 sq mi)	658.03 km^{2} (254.07 sq mi)
Population density	20.3/km^{2} (53/sq mi)	19.5/km^{2} (51/sq mi)	17.7/km^{2} (46/sq mi)
Median age	40.8 (M: 40.8, F: 40.8)	39.0 (M: 38.8, F: 39.3)	38.8 (M: 38.6, F: 38.9)
Private dwellings	5,259 (total) 5,104 (occupied)	4,917 (total)	4,432 (total)
Median household income	$105,000	$87,531	$83,564

Notes: Includes corrections and updates
References: 2021 2016 2011

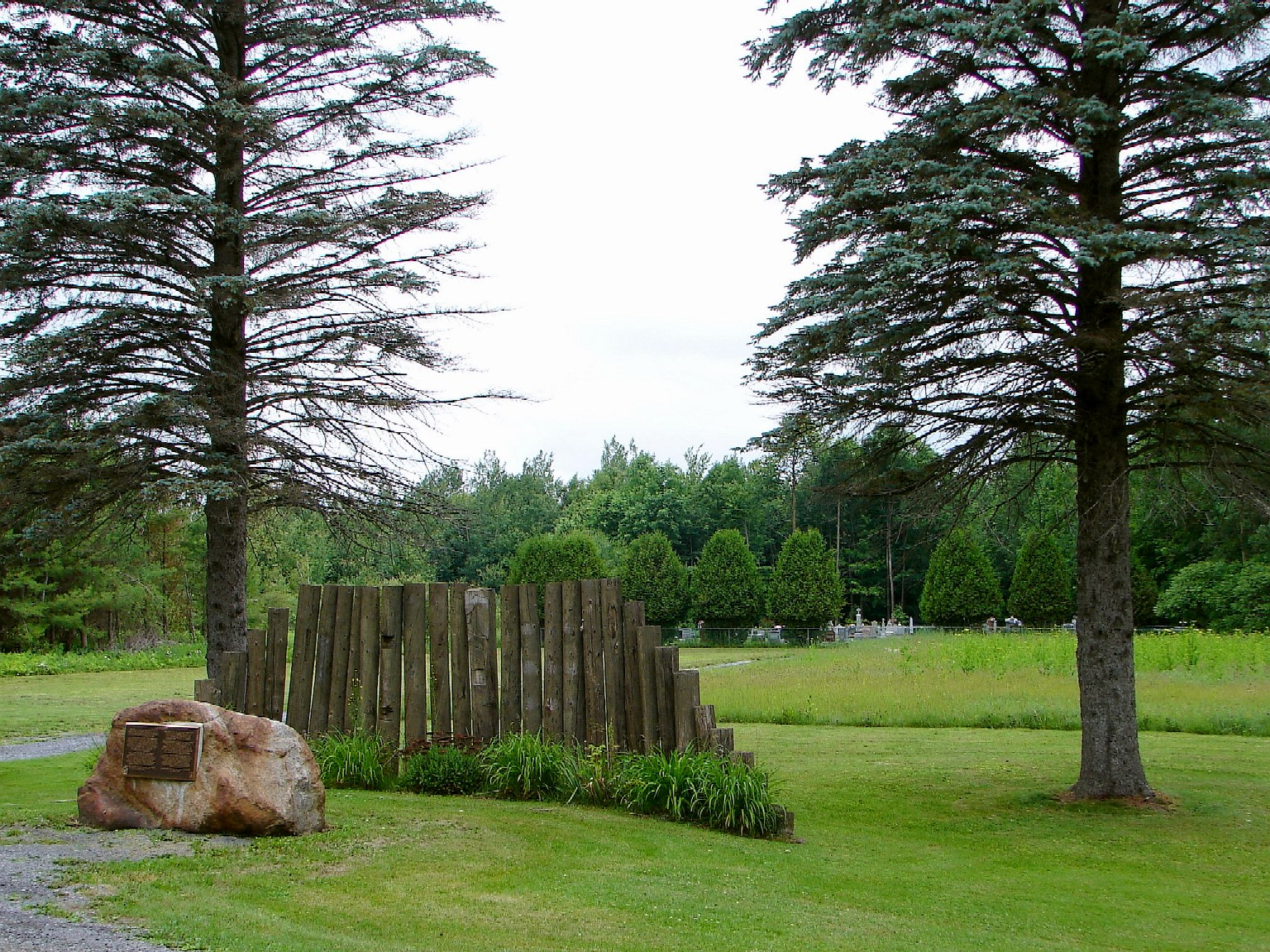
Memorial and graveyard in Lemieux

Historical census populations – The Nation, Ontario

Year	Pop.	±%
1986	8,850	—
1991	9,727	+9.9%
1996	10,478	+7.7%
2001	10,599	+1.2%

Year	Pop.	±%
2006	11,078	+4.5%
2011	11,668	+5.3%
2016	12,808	+9.8%
2021	13,350	+4.2%

Population amounts prior to 1998 are total of Caledonia TP, South Plantagenet TP, Cambridge TP, and St. Isidore VL.
Source: Statistics Canada

The Nation also contains one of the larger concentrations of Francophones in Ontario. According to the 2021 Canadian Census, 64.2% of the population use French as their first language, while 34.3% use English as their first language.

Mother tongue (2021):

- English as first language: 29.8 %
- French as first language: 62.9 %
- English and French as first language: 3.7 %
- Other as first language: 3.2 %

== Attractions ==
The Nation Municipality is home to Calypso Water Park near Limoges and the Alfred Bog. The Ontario Ministry of Natural Resources and Forestry has designated the Alfred Bog as "a provincially significant wetland and an Area of Natural and Scientific Interest." Species of interest include the palm warbler, northern pitcher-plant, pink lady's slipper, cottongrass, bog elfin and bog copper butterflies, and ebony boghaunter dragonfly. It also hosts one of the most southerly herds of moose. The bog is open to the public with a 272 m (892 ft) boardwalk for nature walks.

The Prescott and Russell Recreational Trail goes through the township.

The Larose Forest is also partially located in this municipality.

== See also ==
- Transit Eastern Ontario operated under the authority of The North Glengarry Prescott Russell (NGPR) Transport Board
- List of townships in Ontario
- List of francophone communities in Ontario
