= Plantagenet, Ontario =

Plantagenet
- Unincorporated community
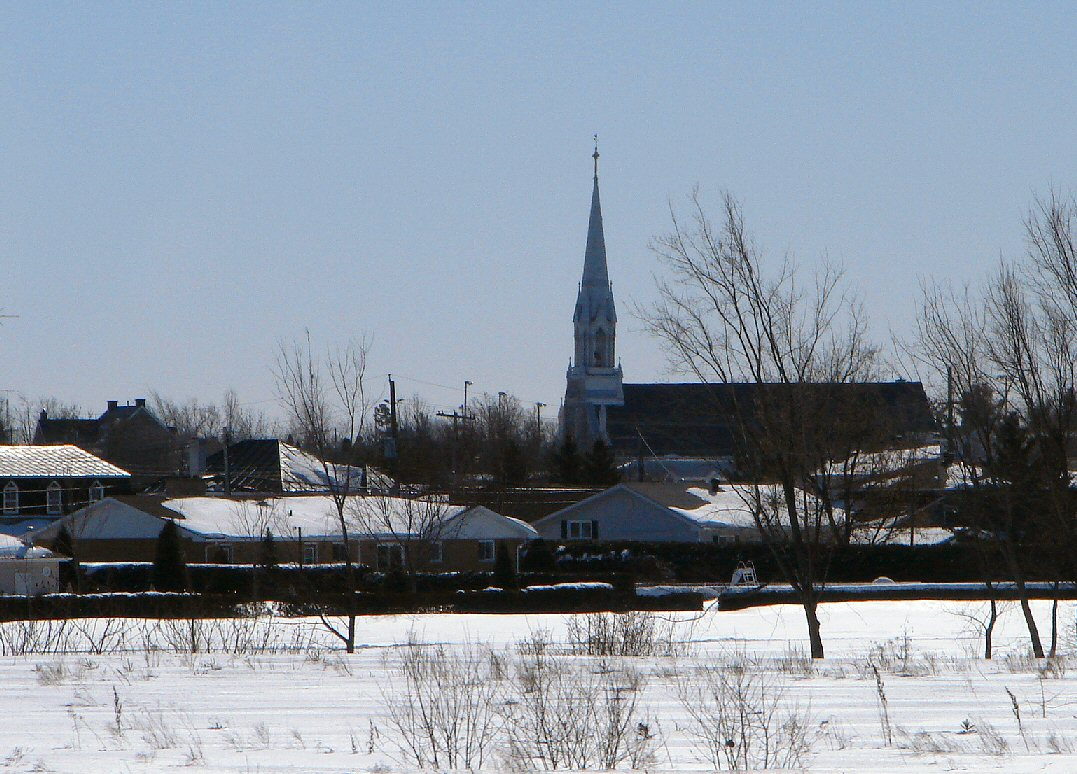

- Location within Southern Ontario
- Coordinates: 45°32′00″N 74°59′40″W
- Country: Canada
- Province: Ontario
- County: Prescott and Russell
- Municipality: Alfred and Plantagenet
- Settled: 1810s
- Incorporated: 1963
- Dissolved (amalgamated): January 1, 1997

Government
  - Fed. riding: Prescott—Russell—Cumberland
  - Prov. riding: Glengarry—Prescott—Russell

Area
  - Land: 3.90 km^{2} (1.51 sq mi)

Population (2021)
  - Total: 1,056
  - Density: 270.7/km^{2} (701/sq mi)
- Time zone: UTC-5 (EST)
  - Summer (DST): UTC-4 (EDT)
- Postal code: K0B 1L0
- Area codes: 613, 343

Plantagenet is an unincorporated community in the Canadian province of Ontario. The community is located within the township of Alfred and Plantagenet and is recognized as a designated place by Statistics Canada.

It was incorporated as an independent village in 1963 when it separated from North Plantagenet Township, and was amalgamated on January 1, 1997, into the Township of Alfred and Plantagenet.

== Demographics ==
In the 2021 Census of Population conducted by Statistics Canada, Plantagenet had a population of 1,056 living in 437 of its 458 total private dwellings, a change of 2.8% from its 2016 population of 1,027. With a land area of 3.9 km^{2} (1.5 sq mi), it had a population density of 270.8/km^{2} (701.3/sq mi) in 2021.

Historical census populations – Plantagenet
(Village 1963–1996, Designated place 1997–...)

Year	Pop.	±%
1966	836	—
1971	909	+8.7%
1976	919	+1.1%
1981	870	−5.3%
1986	846	−2.8%
1991	949	+12.2%

Year	Pop.	±%
1996	967	+1.9%
2001	1,103	+14.1%
2006	806	−26.9%
2011	1,055	+30.9%
2016	1,027	−2.7%
2021	1,056	+2.8%

Population counts are not adjusted for boundary changes.
Source: Statistics Canada

== See also ==
- List of communities in Ontario
- List of designated places in Ontario
