= LGS (band) =

Canadian band

LGS (Swing)
- Origin: Canada
- Genre: Néo-trad
- Years active: 1999–present
- Label: LaFab Musique
- Members: Michel Bénac; Jean-Philippe Goulet
- Past members: Bobby Lalonde
- Website: www.lgsband.com

LGS standing for Le Groupe Swing is a Canadian néo-trad band of Franco-Ontarian origins. The band started as Swing before change of name in 2017. The two main members of Swing are Michel Bénac and Jean-Philippe Goulet.

== Biography ==
=== Michel Bénac ===
Singer and musician, Michel Bénac, is a Franco-Ontarian and the main singer for Swing. He was born in Inia, Ontario, and still lives in the same city(India). Michel's mother is Louise, his father is Michel Bénac and he also has a brother named Christian Mathurin and a sister Jocelynne Bénac. Michel Benac Jr. was a voice student of Cantor Stephen Chaiet of the NATS (National Association of Teachers of Singing of America).

=== Jean-Philippe Goulet ===
The other musician and singer for Swing is Jean-Philippe Goulet. He was born in Rimouski, Quebec. Goulet, a multi-instrumentalist, played guitar, keyboards and violin with Indiscipline and Pole Volt before joining Swing, in which he plays violin and mandolin, as well as singing. He currently lives in Montreal, Quebec. His mother's name is Jean, his father is André Goulet and he has two sisters, Isabelle and Marie-Claude Goulet.

== History ==
Contrary to what the name seems to suggest, its sound is not inspired by swing music, only Franco-Ontarian folklore, which is adapted with techno music. The name comes from the Quebec French term Swinger meaning, in this context, to dance, and the phrase Swing la bacaisse dans le fond d'la boîte à bois!, a classic, almost cliché expression used in Quebec folk music parties.

Experienced musician Michel Bénac, met an R'n'B singer, Bobby Lalonde, who was coming back from Nashville to rediscover the French language. They joined forces and created a new sound, the urban folk music. In 1998, the band Swing was created. Michel and Bobby wrote their first single on February 18, 1998: “Ça va brasser”. After five years, Bobby, co-founder of the band, left the group. Shortly after, Jean-Philippe Goulet joined Michel Bénac to continue the urban folk music band Swing. Being in the core of the group, Jean-Philippe discovered his folk music roots and brought his rock and roll influences into the music created. With the multiple trips and passionate meetings, the flavour is still prominent.

== Music ==
Swing is composed of a duo, Michel Bénac and Jean-Philippe Goulet. They have travelled across Canada and to many countries abroad. As of 2012, Swing has played over 900 shows and in front of at least 500,000 spectators. Using their voices and the musical sounds from their violin, mandolin and scratch, Swing delivered music that incorporates hip/hop and rock with a touch of traditional music.

In 1999, Swing debuted their first album: La Chanson S@crée. This was distributed across Canada.

On July 1, 2001, on Parliament Hill for Canada's birthday, Swing played in front of 100,000 spectators, in conjunction with having the show broadcast on live television. This performance gave them a nomination at the Gemini Gala (2002) in the category of Best Performance, and/or Best guest on a program or series. Swing also walked away with four Trille-Or Awards from the “Gala de la chanson et de la musique franco-ontarienne”.

In 2003, they released their second album: La vie comme ça. Bobby Lalonde passed the torch to the French musician/singer Jean-Philippe Goulet. Swing was invited to participate in many television shows such as Le Garage, Belle et Bum, Palmarès, etc. They also participated in a telethon to help support the research of childhood diseases and disorders. During that year, Swing also started an interprovincial tour and was seen performing at the “Festival franco-ontarien” as well as the Festival acadien de Caraquet.

The following year, in 2004, Swing was asked to record two songs for the Québec Carnaval, to be added to their compilation album. Shortly after, Swing went on tour in Eastern Europe, visiting Poland, the Czech Republic, Slovakia, Hungary and Romania. Once they returned to Canada, they performed in Montreal for Canada's birthday in front of more than 150,000 spectators. Having more than 75 shows under their belts across the country, the end of the year finished with a nomination at the Gala de l'Association québécoise de l'industrie du disque, du spectacle et de la vidéo (ADISQ) in the category of Best Traditional Album.

In 2005, Swing participated for a second time at the Québec Carnaval and started an international tour in South America. This tour took the band to Colombia, Ecuador and Panama. Swing also got a breakthrough in France during the Festival Les Déferlantes de Cap-Breton. This year, Swing also won three awards at the Gala de la chanson et de la musique franco-ontarienne.

In 2006, Swing continued their international success, and participated at the Festival de la francophonie in Douai as well as the Festival de la Virée francophone in Cherbourg, both located in France. This is when they started thinking about their third album. In 2007, Swing was recognized with two more awards and took the year to create their third album entitled: Tradarnac. In 2008, Swing received a nomination from the Canadian Folk Music Awards in the category of French Album of the Year. In 2009, Swing received a nomination at the Juno's for the Best French Album of the Year with Tradarnac.

In 2011, Michel Bénac continued working on Swing as well as working at Lafab Musique Record company, where he produced the albums himself. During the 2015 Pan American Games in Toronto, Swing performed at the closing ceremony.

== Awards ==
Trille-Or Awards (Gala de la chanson et de la musique Franco-ontarienne)

- 2001 Best Song
- 2001 Best Show
- 2001 Best Producer
- 2001 Best Revelation of the Year
- 2005 Best Group
- 2005 Best Show
- 2005 Best Music Video
- 2007 Best Group
- 2007 Best Show

== Discography ==
=== Albums ===
- 1999: La Chanson S@crée (credited as Swing)
- 2001: La vie comme ça (credited as Swing)
- 2007: Tradarnac (credited as Swing)
- 2015: Swing. (credited as Swing)

=== EPs ===
- 2013: One Thought (credited as Swing)
- 2014: Le temps s'arrête (credited as Swing)
- 2018: 45 tours, Vol.1, EP (credited as LGS)
- 2019: 45 tours, Vol.1, Single (credited as LGS)
- 2018: 45 tours, Vol.1, Single (credited as LGS)

=== Songs ===
- 2009: "La goutte" (credited as Swing)
- 2013: "Face à face" (credited as Swing)
- 2014: "C Okay" (credited as Swing)
- 2017: "A l'envers" (credited as LGS)
- 2019: "Thirsty" (credited as LGS)
- 2019: "C come ça (Fa la la)" (credited as LGS)
