= Embrun, Ontario =

Community in Ontario, Canada

- Unincorporated community
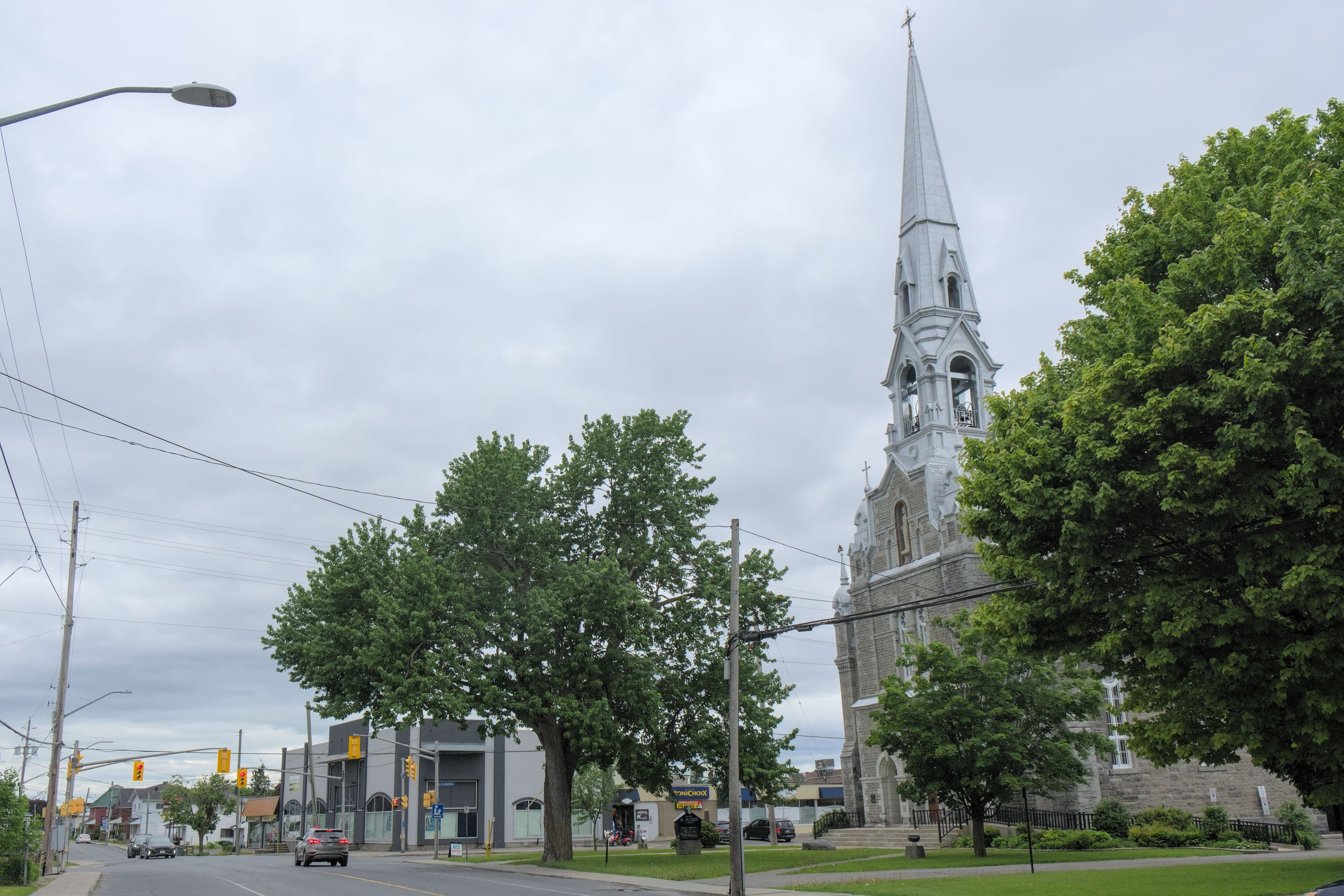
- St. Jaques Parish on Notre-Dame Street

- Coat of arms
- Motto: Fibri Ad Exemplar
- Interactive map of Embrun, Ontario
- Coordinates: 45°16′27.60″N 75°16′54.51″W
- Country: Canada
- Province: Ontario
- Counties: Prescott and Russell
- Township: Russell
- Settled: 1845
- Named: May 15, 1856

Government
  - Mayor: Mike Tarnowski
  - Governing Body: Russell Township
  - MPs: Giovanna Mingarelli
  - MPPs: Stéphane Sarrazin

Area
  - Land: 10.18 km^{2} (3.93 sq mi)
- Elevation: 60 m (200 ft)

Population (2021 census)
  - Total: 8,680
  - Density: 852.3/km^{2} (2,207/sq mi)
  - Demonym: Embrunese
- Time zone: UTC-5 (EST)
  - Summer (DST): UTC-4 (EDT)
- Postal Code: K0A 1W0, K0A 1W1 & K0A 3W0
- Area codes: 613, 343

Embrun (ˈɛmbrən in English; French pronunciation: [ɑ̃bʁœ̃]), is a community in the Canadian province of Ontario in the Eastern Ontario region. Embrun is also part of the National Capital Region. Embrun is part of the larger Russell Township in Prescott and Russell United Counties. In 2021, the population centre of Embrun had a total population of 8,680. This makes Embrun the largest community in the Township of Russell.

Embrun has grown rapidly in the 21st century. The population of Embrun surged nearly 25 per cent to 8,680 between 2016 and 2021, while nearby Russell expanded by 22 per cent to 6,135. On the list of Eastern Ontario cities with at least 1,000 people, in 2021, they ranked first and third in growth. Between 2001 and 2006, the population of Embrun's urban area increased by 26.6%, higher than any other community in the 613 area code and the 8th highest in Ontario. Between 2006 and 2011 its growth was slower, but still more than double the provincial average, growing at a rate of 12.8%, which was the 6th fastest in the 613 area code and the 25th fastest in Ontario.

The town has a French-speaking majority, with a significant English-speaking minority. According to the 2006 Census, 57% of Embrun's population speaks French at home, while 41% speak English at home. The remaining 2% speak either both languages equally, or speak a non-official language.

The community is located approximately 44 km (27 mi) from Ottawa, and 165 km (103 mi) from Montreal, off the Trans-Canada Highway 417, between Russell, Ontario, and Limoges, Ontario.

Politically, the community is situated in the electoral district of Glengarry—Prescott—Russell both provincially and federally.

== History ==
The first residents of Embrun settled the town in 1845. François Michel named the town in 1857 after Embrun, France. The town's early economy was based on lumber, as the area was heavily forested and the soils too moist for good agriculture. In the 1870s, however, with deforestation and the advent of land drainage technologies, agriculture replaced lumber as Embrun's main industry. The town grew rapidly in the late 19th century, a trend accelerated by the advent of the railway in 1898 (see Railway section below).

The 20th century, however, brought a change in direction. Three events happened which harmed Embrun's economy significantly and resulted in population decline. First was the Great Depression in the 1930s and the associated decline in the agriculture industry. Secondly, in the 1950s and 1960s, as with most other small towns across North America, Embrun suffered rural depopulation as its young people left the town to seek education and employment in urban areas. The third blow was the closure of the railway line in 1957.

Towards the end of the 20th century, however, Embrun recovered and began growing rapidly. The construction of Highway 417 in the 1970s cut down travel time to Ottawa significantly, and as a result Embrun residents increasingly began to commute to Ottawa for work, and Embrun was able to attract new residents. In the period from 1985 to 1995 Embrun's population doubled and an indoor shopping mall and business park opened. A second round of major growth occurred in the first few years of the 21st century. Between 2001 and 2006 Embrun was the fastest growing community in the 613 area code and the 8th fastest growing community in the entire province, having grown at a rate of 26.6%. Embrun's growth slowed somewhat in the later part of the 2000s decade, from 26.6% in 2001–2006 to 12.8% in 2006–2011, however, this growth rate is still much higher than the average Ontario growth rate which is 5.7%. As a result of this slowdown Embrun's growth ranking slipped to 6th fastest growth rate in the 613 area code and 25th fastest in Ontario.

=== Railway ===
In 1898, the New York and Ottawa Railway was built. This railway, which travelled between Tupper Lake, New York, and Ottawa, stopped at Embrun six times every day except for Sunday.

This railway line continued operation until 1957, when a combination of pressures from the National Capital Commission, who wished to cut down on the number of railway lines through Ottawa in an effort to eliminate noise pollution, as well as from the Saint Lawrence Seaway project, which required the removal of the railway's bridge in Cornwall, caused the railway line to shut down. The last trains ran in February 1957, and in April CN purchased the railway track and proceeded to demolish it. Although some segments in Cornwall and Ottawa were retained, the line through Embrun was scrapped. A few decades later, the municipal government constructed a rail trail on the right of way, which remains in use to the present day.

== Geography ==
=== Neighbourhoods ===
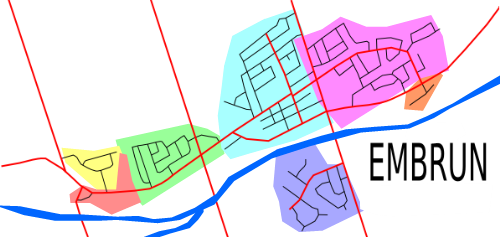
The neighbourhoods of Embrun colour-coded, which include the industrial park (yellow); business park (red); Chantal Development (green); centre ville, or town centre (light blue); Bourdeau Development in the Embrun-Sud (Embrun South) area (purple); Lapointe Development and Mélanie Construction (pink); and Maplevale (orange).

Embrun has several distinct neighbourhoods. With the exception of the Lapointe & Town-Centre neighbourhoods (which have built onto each other as a result of infill development), each of the neighbourhoods are physically separated by open space, although much of this open space will likely be eliminated in the near future as the municipality pushes for more infill.

The smaller community of Brisson may be considered part of Embrun, as it is no longer recognized by any municipal entity.

The municipality has recently adopted smart growth principles to guide its future development. The official plan calls for densification and infill of existing urban land, rather than acquiring more rural land. A near-doubling of Embrun's population will be accomplished in the next 10–15 years with only two new neighbourhoods (both in land already designated as urban land use zones) being built. The rest of the population growth will be done by building housing units in the open spaces between existing neighbourhoods, and by eventually replacing single-family homes on some busier streets with apartments and condos. Through this plan, Embrun's population will increase from its current population of around 6,000 people to upwards of 10,000 people in 2021, with only a small amount of land to the west being added to the urban zone.

==== Business Park ====
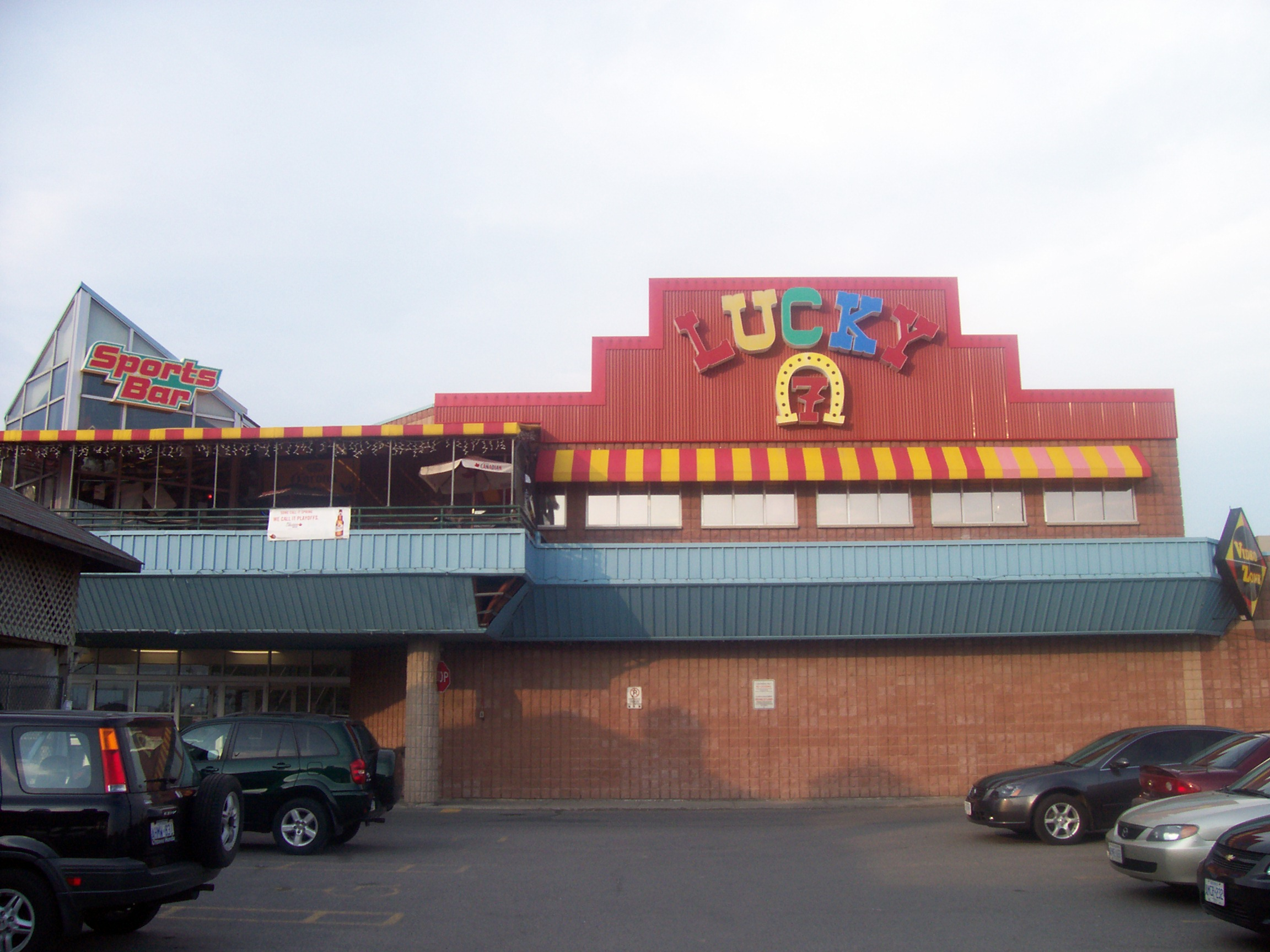
The place d'Embrun shopping mall

The Embrun Business Park is located in the extreme western part of Embrun, west of the Chantal Development. The area is home to nearly all of the town's major businesses. In this area is the Place d'Embrun Shopping Centre as well as some of the town's chain restaurants and large businesses such as renovators, grocery stores and automobile garages. However, this part of Embrun lacks small businesses. Most of the small businesses are in other parts of Embrun.

This part of Embrun, however, has almost no permanent residents due to the fact that it is almost exclusively commercial. There are a few people living on Notre-Dame Street in this area, however, these people are counted as part of the Chantal Development in population counts. The area is paved with many asphalt service roads crisscrossing the area.

==== Industrial Park ====
Embrun also has an Industrial Park. Despite the name, the Industrial Park doesn't really have any industry, just semi-industrial commerce such as warehouses. The Ontario Provincial Police Station is also located here. The Industrial Park is located just to the north of the Embrun Business Park.

The Industrial Park is one of the westernmost areas of Embrun. It has three streets: Industrial Street, New York Central Avenue, and Bay Street.

As a result of municipal zoning regulation reform undertaken in 2010, the Industrial Park technically no longer exists, as the old commercial & industrial zones were replaced with a new "Business Park" designation. Nonetheless, the two areas are distinct in the types of enterprises operating in them.

==== Chantal Development ====
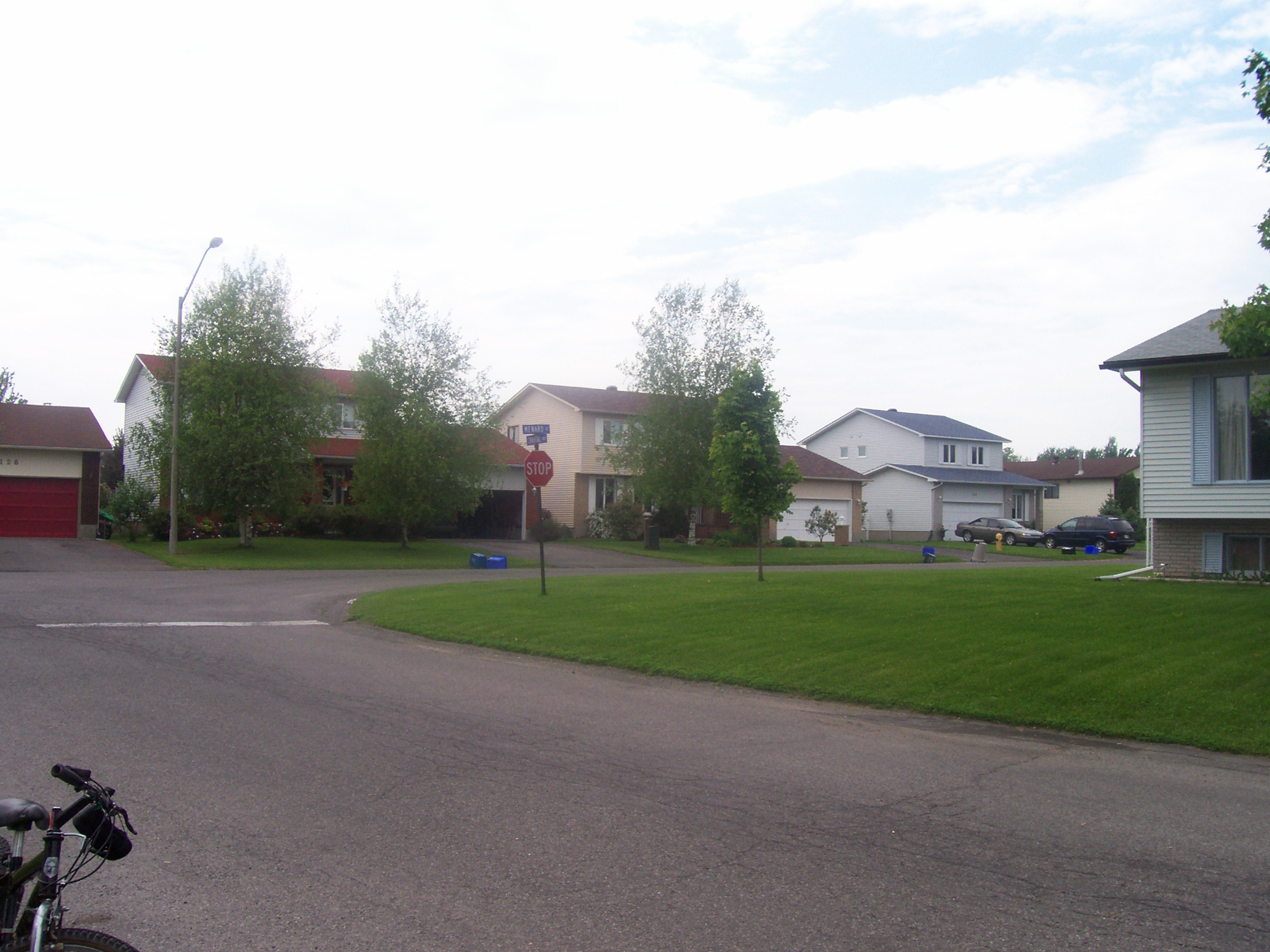
The Chantal Development

Chantal Development is a rather quiet residential area in the Western part of Embrun. To the east of Chantal Development lies the town centre (officially called Centre-Ville). To the west lies the Business Park and the Industrial Park.

There are several streets in the Chantal Development: Olympic Street, Domaine Street, Menard Street, Isabelle Street, Loiselle Street, Chantal Crescent, Promenade Boulevard, and Chateau Crescent.

An infill subdivision is planned for the area and will be located immediately to the north of the current development.

==== Town Centre/Centre-Ville ====
Town Centre/Centre-Ville is home to two of the town's schools (École Publique de la Rivière Castor and St. Jean/La Croisée). Also, the Église St. Jacques is in this part of town. To the west of Town Centre/Centre-Ville is Chantal Development. To the east is Lapointe Development. To the south is the neighbourhood of Embrun South. To the north is rural areas.

The major streets are Ste. Jeanne d'Arc Street, Blais Street, Centenaire Street (also in Lapointe Development), St Jean Baptiste Street, Castlebeau Street, St. Augustin Street, and Lamadeleine Boulevard.

Some infill has occurred in recent years, and more is planned along the western and northern fringes of the neighbourhood.

==== Lapointe Development ====
The Lapointe Development is in the eastern part of Embrun. To the west is Town Centre/Centre-Ville and to the south is the small neighbourhood of Maplevale. To the north is Brisson. The Lapointe Development is currently undergoing infill expansion. The term Melanie Construction (after the developer who is building the infill projects) refers to the newer infill subdivisions. Another infill subdivision is planned just northwest of the current infill area, and will be integrated into infill projects in the Town Centre/Centre-Ville. In addition, an entirely new neighbourhood (not infill) is also planned to the northeast along St-Thomas Road.

There are several streets in the Lapointe Development: Lapointe Boulevard, Fleurette Street, Sophie Street, Alain Street, Chateauguay Road, Filion Street, La Prairie Street, Centenaire Street (also in Town Centre/Centre-Ville), Frontenac Boulevard, Citadelle Street, Louis Riel Street, La Croisée Street, Radisson Drive, Bourassa Street and Normandie Street.

==== Embrun South ====
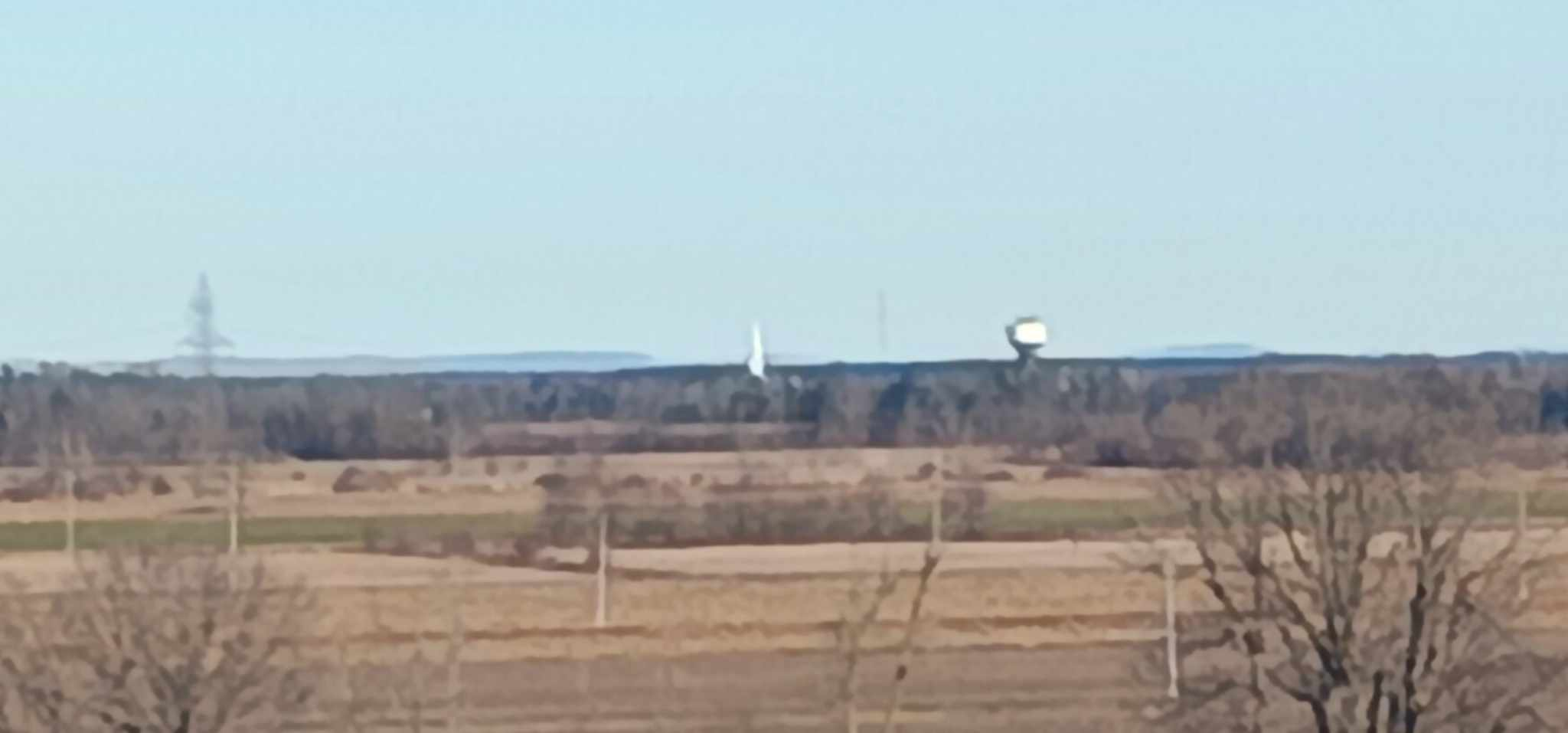
The view from the sky in Embrun South

The area of Embrun south of the Castor River is called Embrun South (Embrun-Sud in French). The area has a housing subdivision, as well as older, mixed development along arterial roads. To the north lies Town Centre/Centre-Ville. To the east, west and south lies rural areas. The area is near the Embrun Water Tower on St-Jacques Road. The land area formerly known as the Norm's Gym summer camp (condos will replace the camp), as well as the École secondaire catholique Embrun are in this area. No infill developments have taken place, although a completely new neighbourhood to the east of the current development, along St-Joseph Road, is planned.

==== Maplevale ====
The small neighbourhood of Maplevale, located to the immediate south of the Lapointe Development, is a more affluent area with a higher land values and larger homes.

=== Climate ===
Embrun has a continental climate with cool winters, humid summers, and short autumns and springs.

Summers in Embrun usually last about 5 months, and winters are about 4–4½ months long. Autumn and spring are shorter.

The first snowfalls of the year usually occur in mid-to-late November, but snow doesn't actually cover the ground until December. Before that, snow usually melts as soon as it hits the ground.

In the spring, the snow usually starts melting in March, although occasional "warm breaks" with temperatures as high as 10 °C (50 °F) usually occur once or twice in January and February.

Also, in the spring, the area tends to smell of cow manure, and the run-off into the Castor River begins.

In recent years, winters have gotten much warmer, so freezing rain will often occur. This makes driving very hazardous and often cancels school buses, with the roads very icy for a few days.

In the summer, humidity is often common, especially in July. Although temperatures are usually just under 30 °C (86 °F), with the humidity it can feel as hot as 35 °C (95 °F) or higher.

== Demographics ==
In the 2021 Census of Population conducted by Statistics Canada, Embrun had a population of 8,680 living in 3,229 of its 3,278 total private dwellings, a change of 24.6% from its 2016 population of 6,968. With a land area of 10.18 km^{2} (3.93 sq mi), it had a population density of 852.7/km^{2} (2,208.4/sq mi) in 2021.

Historical census populations – Embrun, Ontario
Year	Pop.	±%
2006	5,655	—
2011	6,380	+12.8%
2016	6,918	+8.4%
2021	8,680	+25.5%
Population counts are not adjusted for boundary changes. Source: Statistics Canada

Note: Percentages given may not add up to 100% due to rounding.

Language: 57% of Embrun's population speaks French at home, while 41% speak English at home. The remaining 2% speak either both languages equally, or speak a non-official language. However, because there a significant number of French-Canadians who change their primary language to English later in life, the number of people whose mother tongue is French is higher than those who speak French as their main home language. 63% of Embrun residents list French as their mother tongue, while 33% list English as their mother tongue. 66% of Embrun residents are bilingual in both English and French, 24% speak only English, and 9% speak only French. For language of work, the English language is disproportionately common; while only 41% of Embrun residents speak English at home, 57% of Embrun residents speak primarily or exclusively English at work.

Ethnicity and immigration: The racial makeup of Embrun is 95.8% White, 2.5% Aboriginal, 0.6% Black, 0.6% Arab, 0.3% Chinese, and 0.2% other. According to the census, there are no people in Embrun who belong to the Japanese, Southeast Asian, Filipino, or South Asian racial categories, however, Statistics Canada rounds low data values to the nearest value ending in 5 or 0, so there may be 0, 1, or 2 people in these four categories. The vast majority of the population of Embrun are Canadian citizens; only 0.2% of Embrun residents lack Canadian citizenship. 4.5% of the adult population is foreign-born, while a further 7.1% are Canadian-born but have at least one foreign-born parent.

Income: The median income for Embrun residents is $40,567 a year, higher than the Ontario average of $29,335 a year. Note that those values include all residents over the age of 15 with any reported income, meaning that (for example) teenagers working minimum wage on their days off school would be included. If only full-time workers are included, the median income for Embrun residents rises to $50,096 a year, still above the Ontario average, which for this category is $44,748 a year.

== Economy ==
Embrun is a bedroom community: a majority of the population works in nearby Ottawa and commutes into the city on a daily basis. A large proportion of these people are people with post-secondary education who work in the Canadian civil service or Ottawa's large high-tech sector. This has been the case since the mid-20th century. Prior to then, agriculture employed the majority of the community's population.

Agriculture still has a significant presence in the area. It is one of the major distributors of dairy products and bovine in the region. These farms also include hundreds of sheep, corn (sold to local grocery stores and markets) and numerous other products.

One unique feature of Embrun is the number of market garden businesses. Primarily owned and operated by local French Canadian families, their produce is sold in the village and as far away as Ottawa's Byward Market area and Westboro neighbourhood.

== Politics ==
=== Municipal ===
In the 2006 Russell Township election, citizens of Embrun showed a particularly strong support for ex-mayor Ken Hill, with 1,431 Embrun voters voting for Ken Hill compared with 678 for Denis Bourdeau and 560 for Michael McHugh.

Lorraine Dicaire, Jean-Paul St. Pierre, Donald St. Pierre and Jamie Laurin received the most votes in Embrun for councillors, in order of most votes to fewest votes. These four councillors were also the ones who received the most votes in the township as a whole. The candidates that ran for councillor, but didn't get into council were Charlie Harland, Jean-Serge Brisson, Pierre Brulotte, and Marthe Lepine.

The newly elected mayor was tested when a major blackout (caused by a freezing rain storm which was part of the Early Winter 2006 North American Storm Complex) affected the town from December 1–2, 2006, which left virtually the entire town without electricity. Hill declared a state of emergency, which lasted for several days.

In the 2010 election Ken Hill was defeated soundly, falling to third place. The election was won by Jean-Paul St. Pierre who became the township's new mayor, however Embrun voters favoured second-place candidate Lorraine Dicaire (1246 Embrun votes for Dicaire compared to 889 Embrun votes for St. Pierre) This was balanced out by overwhelming support for St. Pierre in the rest of the township, however, so in the end St. Pierre won handily.

=== Provincial and federal ===
Embrun is part of the electoral district of Glengarry-Prescott-Russell for both federal and provincial elections. Traditionally this seat is a Liberal stronghold in both governments. This is starting to change, however, as the Conservatives gain support in the area. Federally, the riding was Liberal for many decades until 2006 when it was narrowly taken by Conservative candidate Pierre Lemieux. Lemieux's support has gradually increased, and in 2011 he won re-election by over 10,000 votes.

Provincially, however, it has remained Liberal. In the 2011 provincial election, the riding stayed Liberal (albeit by a narrow margin) despite the retirement of popular Liberal incumbent Jean Marc Lalonde, and despite the fact that the Liberals lost nearly twenty seats across Ontario.

== Transportation ==
The main road in Embrun is Notre-Dame Street (County Road 3). This busy street travels east–west across Embrun, linking its neighbourhoods together. At its western end it connects to Castor Street in neighbouring Russell, while its eastern end travels to the nearby village of Casselman, located 12 km to the east. As Embrun grows, the street has experienced significant congestion. Part of this is aggravated by the fact that, with the exception of a 1 km section in western Embrun which has a centre turning lane, the street is still a conventional two lane street. The municipality has studied the possibility of widening the entire stretch of the street to two lanes in each direction with a centre turning lane, however the cost of this is seen as prohibitive, so instead, the municipality has focused on projects to make traffic flow more efficient. This included the upgrading of intersections, including the installation of new left-turn signals at two intersections (completed in 2011) and the replacement of another intersection with a roundabout (completed in 2012).

Embrun is located 8 km south of Highway 417, a major freeway that links Ottawa and Montreal, and which is part of the Trans-Canada Highway network. Two exits--#88 and #79—provide access to Embrun. St-Guillaume Road links Exit #88 with Notre-Dame Street, while Limoges Road does the same for Exit #79. St-Guillaume Road and Exit #88 is the busier of the two, because it is significantly closer to Ottawa. Embrun's rapid growth in recent years as well as an increased trend of commuting to Ottawa for work has led to congestion on St-Guillaume Road. A study by the county council proposed widening St-Guillaume Road into a four-lane road, or introducing a new corridor to the highway in between exits #88 and #79.

Embrun also has a small bike lane network. A bicycle route runs east–west through the community. This route consists of a bike trail in the western part of the community, a bike lane on Blais Street in the centre, and a bike lane on Centenaire Street in the east.

A privately operated airfield, the Ottawa/Embrun Aerodrome is located to the southwest of the urban area of Embrun.

=== Public transit ===
In recent years, transit service has been introduced to the community. The municipal government, through a contract with Trillium Coach Lines, runs three peak-hour express routes to downtown Ottawa from Embrun. As of 2012, they are:

- Route 523, which arrives in Ottawa for 7:00AM and leaves Ottawa a little after 3:00PM
- Route 524, which arrives in Ottawa for 7:30AM and leaves Ottawa at 4:00PM
- Route 525, which arrives in Ottawa for 7:50AM and leaves Ottawa at 4:15PM

As this route is contracted with a private company, fares are high. As of 2012, a monthly pass costs $247, while one-way cash fare is $15.

== Education ==
Embrun has three elementary schools and one secondary school. Because Ontario divides the education system into English Public, English Catholic, French Public, and French Catholic streams, which school Embrun children attend depends on which stream they are in.

Embrun students in the English Public stream are served by Upper Canada District School Board. Their elementary school is Cambridge Public School, located in Forest Park, while their secondary school is Russell High School in the neighbouring community of Russell.

Those in the English Catholic stream are served by Catholic District School Board of Eastern Ontario. This school board does not have any schools in Embrun. Embrun students enrolled in this board attend Mother Teresa school for elementary, and St. Thomas Aquinas school for secondary. Both of these schools are in the neighbouring community of Russell.

Those in the French Public stream are served by the Conseil des écoles publiques de l'Est de l'Ontario school board. Their elementary school is De la Rivière Castor school in Embrun, while their secondary school is L’Académie de la Seigneurie in nearby Casselman.

Those in the French Catholic stream are served by the Conseil scolaire du district catholique de l'Est ontarien school board. Their elementary school is École élémentaire catholique Embrun, which is divided into two buildings which neighbour each other: the Pavillon Saint-Jean which has grades K-2, and the Pavillon La Croisée which has grades 3–6. Their secondary school is École secondaire catholique Embrun.

== Media ==
Two newspapers are published in Embrun: Le Reflet (a weekly French language newspaper) and The Prescott-Russell News (in both English and French). La Nouvelle, a weekly newspaper published in French, has closed.

A newspaper that is published in Rockland called Vision is delivered in Embrun as well. The Villager, a newspaper that is published in the neighbouring town of Russell, is also delivered in Embrun. Unlike Vision, The Villager is a paper that people must subscribe to or buy at a local store.

CJRO Radio (CJRO-FM) broadcast in Embrun on 107.7 FM. It is a low power (40 watts) bilingual community non-profit FM community radio station that promotes local and regional events, provides important information and news to residents and the public in south-east rural Ottawa and the Russell Municipality. CJRO-FM is licensed by the CRTC to play music (Rock, Country, French pop, Blues and Celtic music). It's also available on 107.7 FM in Carlsbad Springs and in the village of Vars and Sarsfield on 107.9 FM. A new FM transmitter (107.9 FM) will be installed in the village of Casselman in late 2022 or early 2023 (pending CRTC authorization). The station streams online on cjroradio.com (https://www.cjroradio.com). CJRO Radio is also available via the Tune In and Radio Player Canada app via iPhone and Android phones. Since August 2022 CJRO Radio production studio in Embrun is situated inside the COOP Embrun building on chemin Notre-Dame. The station's broadcast facility is situated inside the Carlsbad Springs Community Centre (6020 Piperville Rd).

== See also ==
- Embrun Panthers
- Ottawa/Embrun Aerodrome
