= Bobby Lalonde (musician) =

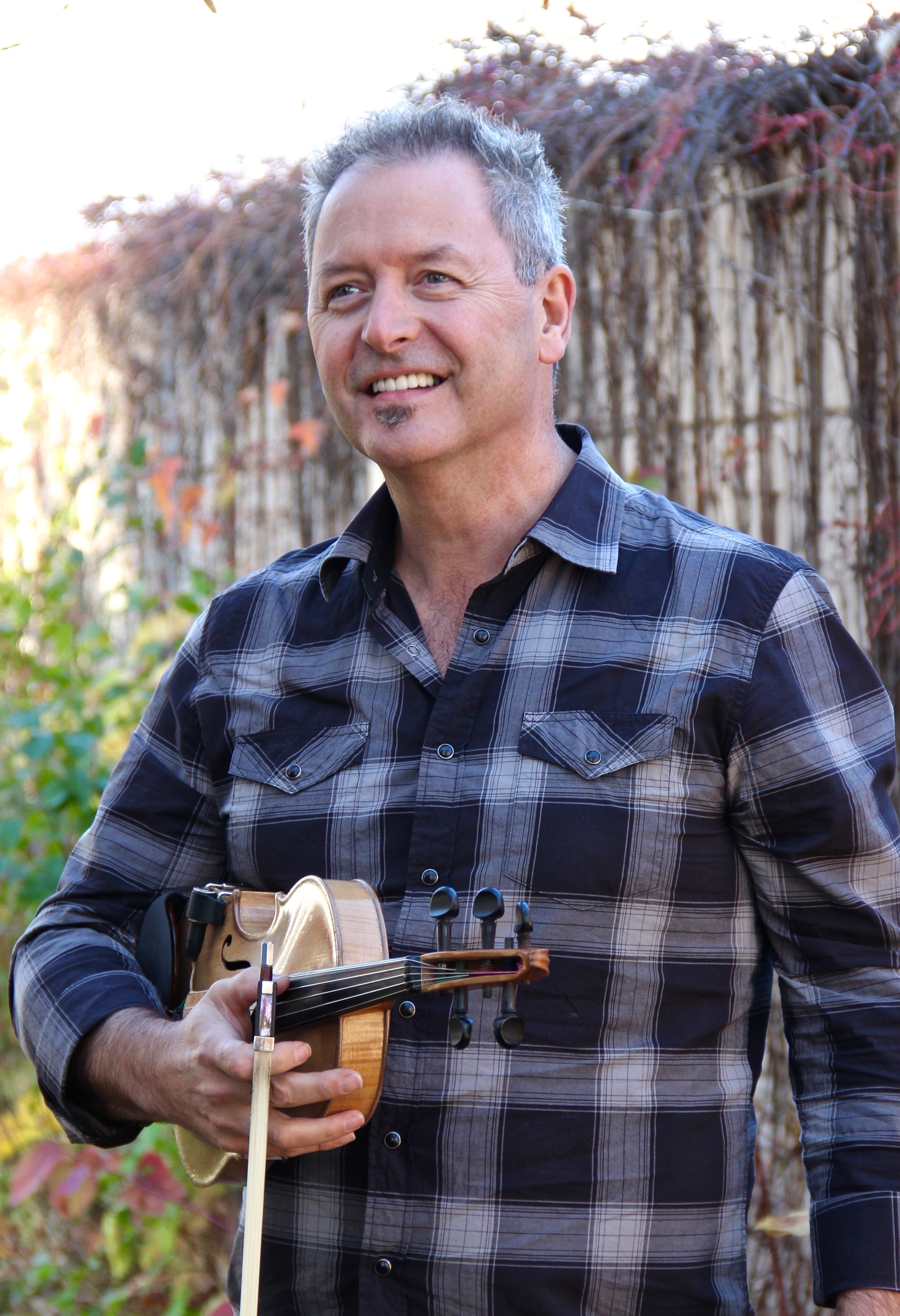
- Born: May 22, 1958 (age 67); Hawkesbury, Ontario, Canada
- Spouse: Joy Young (1984-present)
- Children: Adam; Brandon; Kelita
- Musical career
- Genres: Country; folk
- Occupation(s): Musician, producer, songwriter, store owner
- Instrument(s): Fiddle, guitar, vocals

Bobby Lalonde (born May 22, 1958) is a Canadian musician originating from the Ottawa Valley (Eastern Ontario).

== Family and early life ==
Lalonde was born on May 22, 1958. The youngest of four brothers (Gerry, Gilles, and Marc), he grew up surrounded by various musical influences. His parents, Beatrice Lalonde (Couture) and Gaston Lalonde, were both of French-Canadian heritage, and had strong ties to Ottawa-Valley country music. He attended the French Catholic elementary school in Saint-Isidore-de-Prescott and the École secondaire catholique de Plantagenet.

Lalonde began playing the fiddle at the age of eight, and soon the Lalonde family band "The Four Sons" was formed. By the time Lalonde was thirteen, he was signed to a three-albums contract with London Records of Canada, had won the North American Junior Fiddle Championship, and was a much-in-demand musician for studio, television and live performances.

== Music career ==
At the age of fifteen, Lalonde was featured with Stompin' Tom Connors in the 1973 movie Across this Land with Stompin' Tom Connors. He also played fiddle multiple times on the Quebec television series Le Ranch à Willie featuring Willie Lamothe.

In his late teens, Lalonde joined the award-winning rock group Garolou. He contributed to the albums Romancero (1980), and Garolou (1978), for which the band won Félix Awards for album of the year.

Soon after his time with Garolou, Lalonde fronted his own group, the Bobby Lalonde Band, which toured continuously from 1981 to 1997. The band played multiple venues across Canada and the United States, and also embarked on several tours through Holland, Belgium, Germany and Switzerland. Over the years, the band featured artists such as Alain Brisson, Roger Belisle, Normand Couture, Ted Gerro, Kelli Trottier, Peter Beaudoin, Dave Arthur, Gilles Godard, Sylvain Lavoie, Charlie Grassy, Jean Poulin, Eric Sauve, and Steve Piticco. With his band, Lalonde went on to win multiple Canadian Country Music Association awards, including "Instrumentalist of the Year" three times, "Back Up Band of the Year" twice, and "All Star Band - Special Instrument". The group also received numerous Canadian Country Music Association nominations between 1983 and 1993.

During this time Lalonde's song writing talents were also recognized, and he was honoured with two #1 records and several top ten hits. To date he has fourteen albums to his credit, and has performed with greats such as Tom Cochrane, Kenny Rogers, Ricky Skaggs, Waylon Jennings, Colleen Peterson, Joe Diffy, George Jones, Johnny Cash and many more.

Performances also include the Havelock Country Jamboree, Power Aid Live at the Ottawa's Corel Centre (now Canadian Tire Center), St. Tite Festival, Gatineau Clog, and Ottawa's National Art Center. In 1981, Lalonde received an invitation from Prime Minister Pierre Trudeau to perform at the 7th G7 summit in Montebello, Quebec with Liona Boyd and Diana Juster for eight world leaders.

Lalonde has also co-hosted his own TV show with Ronnie Prophet, titled Spirit of the Country, and has hosted many prestigious events including the Canada Day Festivities at Queen's Park in Toronto, as well as had numerous appearances on Canadian television variety shows.

In 1998 Lalonde joined Michel Bénac to create a new sound, urban folk music. Their new group, dubbed Swing, was a Canadian néo-trad band of Franco-Ontarian origins, which mixed Franco-Ontarian folklore with techno music. Michel and Lalonde wrote their first single on February 18, 1998, entitled "Ça va brasser". Swing's debut album and tour earned them four Trille-Or Awards from the Association des Professionnels de la Chanson et de la Musique.

On July 1, 2001, Swing performed on Parliament Hill for Canada Day, in front of 100,000 spectators. The performance was also broadcast on live television across Canada. This performance gave them a nomination at the Gemini Awards (2002) in the category of Best Performance or Host in a Variety Program or Series.

When not performing, Lalonde was also an accomplished record producer and recording artist, often contributing to his clients' albums. His recording studio, Bolab Audio Productions, produced albums for many artists, including the Brigadoons, Ashley MacLeod, Trevor Baker, Michel Bénac, Paddy Kelly, The Glengarry Bhoys, Kelli Trottier, Rob Taylor, Brian Caddell, Northern Sons, Ronnie Prophet, Marie King, Carol Ann King, Gilles Godard, Brigadoons, Macleod Fiddlers, Manon Séguin, Arc En Son, Eric Michael Hawks, Gail Gavan, and the Glengarry Highland Games.

Lalonde has a long history of both playing for and hosting the CHEO telethon. Lalonde also contributed to Wayne Rostad's "Christmas in the Valley" album, in support of CHEO. His many years of volunteering for the telethon earned him a 2015 CHEO Order of the Good Bear award, which is the CHEO Foundation's tribute to community members for volunteer efforts and fundraising initiatives.

In October 2002, Lalonde stepped back from his lifelong career as a performing artist in order to focus on other ventures. Along with his wife and family, Lalonde opened Bobby Lalonde Music, a retail store and sound production company. Originally located in Vankleek Hill, Ontario, the store is now in Hawkesbury, Ontario.

== Discography ==
| Release | Group | Album title | Track listing | Notes |
|---|---|---|---|---|
| 1973 | Bobby Lalonde | Volume 1 | 1. First Century; 2. Maple Sugar; 3. Dragging the Bow; 4. Marion Waltz; 5. Grand-Pa's Brushout; 6. Dauphin Waltz; 7. Black Foot Jam; 8. Sweet Georgia Brown; 9. Louisiana Waltz; 10. Boil the Cabbage; 11. Eidleweiss; 12. Shelburne Reel; 13. Rippling Water Jig | London Records SDS-5154 |
| 1974 | Bobby Lalonde | Volume 2 | 1. Eddy's Reel; 2. Maytime Swing; 3. Autumn Waltz; 4. Walking Up Town; 5. Springhill Jig; 6. Pretty Priscille Waltz; 7. Johnny Mooring Special; 8. Gros Morne; 9. Carol Kennedy Waltz; 10. Big John McNeil; 11. Niomi's Jig; 12. Angus Campbell | London Records SDS-5177 |
| 1976 | Bobby Lalonde | Volume 3 | 1. Blazing Sun; 2. Little Burnt Potato; 3. Clarinet Polka; 4. Ookpic Waltz; 5. Just Jazzin'; 6. Back Forty Rop-Off; 7. Foggy Mountain Breakdown; 8. The Ashton Rose; 9. Orange Blossom Special; 10. Yellow Bird; 11. Blue Sea; 12. Silver Wedding Reel; 13. Ice on the Road | London Records SDS-5184 |
| 1978 | Garolou | Garolou | 1. Aux Illinois; 2. La complainte du maréchal Biron; 3. Le départ pour les États; 4. Je me suis habillé en plumes 5. Alouette; 6. Victoria; 7. La retraite de Bonaparte; 8. Wing-tra-la; 9. Germaine | London Records LFS-9027: Félix Award winner - 1979 Best Folklore or Traditional Album; CAN: Gold Album Certification |
| 1980 | Garolou | Romancero | 1. Le mariage anglais - 5:34; 2. Sur le bout du pont - 3:30; 3. Damon et Henriette - 4:42; 4. Nicholas - 5:43; 5. Dr. Mason - 2:58; 6. Dans Paris - 3:55; 7. La danse de la limonade - 3:23; 8. Quand j'étais garçon - 2:33; 9. D'où reviens-tu, mon fils Jacques - 6:00; 10. Le condamné - 4:13 | London Records LFS-9032: Félix Award winner - 1980 Best Folklore or Traditional Album |
| 1980 | Various Artists | Christmas in the Valley | 1. Christmas in the Valley - Wayne Rostad; 2. Scarlet Ribbons - Neville Wells; 3. Silver Bells - Terry Carisse; 4. Beautiful Star of Bethlehem - Family Brown; 5. Pretty Paper - Rick Thompson; 6. I Believe in Santa Claus - Wayne Rostad & The Forest Ridge Gang; 7. One Bright Star - Bruce Golden; 8. The Heart of Christmas is a Child - Dave Jeffrey, Robin Moir & Craig Kennedy; 9. If Every Day Was Like Christmas - Bobby Lalonde; 10. Thank God for Kids - Wayne Rostad | Stag Creek Records WRC1-4879 |
| | Bobby Lalonde Band | Forty Shades of Blue | 1. Forty Shades of Blue; 2. Play Old Man; 3. Rosin Up; 4. Breezy Nights; 5. Just Kidding; 6. Lisa; 7. Jamie; 8. This Dream; 9. Midnight Ride; 10. Diggy Diggy Li | Bolab Records CRI-8136 |
| | Bobby Lalonde | Long Lonely Nights | 1. Let's Do It Again; 2. She Got Away With Love; 3. Lovers Will; 4. Long Lonely Nights; 5. Fool In Love; 6. If Your Love Ran Out Tomorrow; 7. Thanks To You; 8. Best of Love; 9. Hold Me To It; 10. Burning Out Of Control | Bookshop Records International LTD BSR-33-770 |
| | Bobby Lalonde Band | Fiddle Man | 1. Zydeco; 2. Fiddleman; 3. Somedays; 4. Road to the Blues; 5. Be My Wife; 6. Cutting the Strings; 7. Somebody Painted My Hometown; 8. Fiddle Medley (Live); 9. I Can't Get Close Enough; 10. Gospel Medley | |
| | Bobby Lalonde Band | Shadow Knows | 1. Writing On The Wall; 2. Heart To The Wall; 3. Shadow Knows; 4. Count On Me; 5. Cajun Girl; 6. Could I Be Excused; 7. Blue Eyes; 8. Reinvented Love; 9. Sands Of Time; 10. Cajun Love Bug | |
| | Bobby Lalonde Band | BLB Live | 1. Eagles Medley; 2. New Country; 3. Blue Rose Is; 4. Limonade; 5. Macarena; 6. Country Roads; 7. Blue Bayou; 8. Gospel Medley; 9. Banjy Minuett; 10. The Devil... | |
| | Bobby Lalonde | Violina' | 1. Le Reel De Fournier; 2. Jig Medley; 3. Violina; 4. Clog, Jig & Reels; 5. Jazz Medley; 6. Kelita's Jig; 7. Bubba's Rag; 8. Mooring's Farewell; 9. Wild Fiddler's Rag; 10. Danny Boy | |
| | Bobby Lalonde | Classiques de Noel | 1. Winter Wonderland; 2. O Holy Night; 3. Let It Snow; 4. White Christmas; 5. Santa Claus Is Coming To Town; 6. Silver Bells; 7. The Christmas Song; 8. Jingle Bell Rock; 9. Falling Snow; 10. Silent Night | |
| 1999 | Swing | La Chanson Sacrée | 1. Ça Va Brasser; 2. Tien-Toé Ben; 3. Sur Le Bord Du St-Laurent; 4. Un Bon Matin; 5. Pour La Vie; 6. Vasectomie D’La Vie; 7. La Chanson Sacrée; 8. Au Champ Des Rêves; 9. Héo; 10. Sortie 51 | Tox Records: 2001 Best New Single - "Un bon matin" - Trille Or - Association des Professionnels de la Chanson et de la Musique; 2001 Best Producer - Bobby Lalonde - Trille Or - Association des Professionnels de la Chanson et de la Musique |

== Awards and recognition ==
- 2015 CHEO Order of the Good Bear recipient (CHEO Foundation's tribute to community members for volunteer efforts and fundraising initiatives)
- 2013 Honorary President Jeux Franco-ontariens
- 2003 Inductee, Ottawa Valley Country Music Hall of Fame
- 2003 Recognition Award The Musicians' Association of Ottawa-Hull (now Musicians' Association of Ottawa-Gatineau)
- 2003 Country Album of the Year - "Simple Man" by Trevor Baker - Producer Bobby Lalonde - GMA Canada Covenant Awards
- 2003 Traditional Gospel Song of the Year - "O Canada" by Trevor Baker - Producer Bobby Lalonde - GMA Canada Covenant Awards
- 2001 Best New Single - "Un bon matin" - Swing, Trille Or - Association des Professionnels de la Chanson et de la Musique
- 2001 Best New Group - Swing, Trille Or - Association des Professionnels de la Chanson et de la Musique
- 2001 Best Live Performance - Swing, Trille Or - Association des Professionnels de la Chanson et de la Musique
- 2001 Best Producer - Swing - Bobby Lalonde, Trille Or - Association des Professionnels de la Chanson et de la Musique
- 1990 All Star Band - Special Instrument - Bobby Lalonde (Fiddle - Bobby Lalonde), Canadian Country Music Association
- 1987 Back-Up Band Of The Year - Bobby Lalonde Band, Canadian Country Music Association
- 1987 Instrumentalist of the Year - Bobby Lalonde, Canadian Country Music Association
- 1986 Back-Up Band Of The Year - Bobby Lalonde Band, Canadian Country Music Association
- 1986 Instrumentalist of the Year - Bobby Lalonde, Canadian Country Music Association
- 1984 Instrumentalist of the Year - Bobby Lalonde, Canadian Country Music Association
- 1980 Best Folklore or Traditional Album - Garolou for album Romancero - Félix Award ADISQ
- 1979 Best Folklore or Traditional Album - Garolou for album Garolou - Félix Award ADISQ
- 1979 Gold Album Certification - Garolou for album Garolou
- 1974 Canadian Junior Fiddle Champion

== Nominations ==
- 2002 Best Performance or Host in a Variety Program or Series - Swing - Bobby Lalonde - The Thrill on the Hill: Canada Day 2001 - Gemini Awards
- 1993 All Star Band - Fiddle - Bobby Lalonde Band (Bobby Lalonde), Canadian Country Music Association
- 1992 All Star Band - Fiddle - Bobby Lalonde Band (Bobby Lalonde), Canadian Country Music Association
- 1992 Back-Up Band Of The Year - Bobby Lalonde Band, Canadian Country Music Association
- 1991 All Star Band - Fiddle - Bobby Lalonde Band (Bobby Lalonde), Canadian Country Music Association
- 1991 Back-Up Band Of The Year - The Bobby Lalonde Band, Canadian Country Music Association
- 1991 Instrumentalist of the Year - Bobby Lalonde, Canadian Country Music Association
- 1990 Back-Up Band Of The Year - The Bobby Lalonde Band, Canadian Country Music Association
- 1990 Instrumentalist of the Year - Bobby Lalonde, Canadian Country Music Association
- 1989 Back-Up Band Of The Year - Bobby Lalonde Band, Canadian Country Music Association
- 1989 Group or Duo of the Year - The Bobby Lalonde Band, Canadian Country Music Association
- 1989 Instrumentalist of the Year - Bobby Lalonde, Canadian Country Music Association
- 1988 Back-Up Band Of The Year - Bobby Lalonde Band, Canadian Country Music Association
- 1988 Instrumentalist of the Year - Bobby Lalonde, Canadian Country Music Association
- 1987 Songwriters' of the Year - Gilles Godard / Bobby Lalonde - No Holiday In LA (Ronnie Prophet), Canadian Country Music Association
- 1986 Group or Duo of the Year - The Bobby Lalonde Band, Canadian Country Music Association
- 1985 Group or Duo of the Year - The Bobby Lalonde Band, Canadian Country Music Association
- 1985 Instrumentalist of the Year - Bobby Lalonde, Canadian Country Music Association
- 1984 Group or Duo of the Year - Bobby Lalonde Band, Canadian Country Music Association
- 1983 Group or Duo of the Year - Bobby Lalonde Band, Canadian Country Music Association
- 1980 Group of the Year - Garolou - Félix Award ADISQ
- 1979 Group of the Year - Garolou]- Félix Award ADISQ
