= Conseil scolaire de district catholique de l'Est ontarien =

School board in Ontario, Canada

Conseil scolaire de district catholique de l'Est ontarien CSDCEO

Location
- L'Orignal Prescott and Russell and Stormont, Dundas and Glengarry Counties Canada

District information
- Chair of the board: François Bazinet
- Director of education: François Turpin
- Schools: 32 Total (25 elementary, 7 secondary)

Other information
- Elected trustees: Sergine Rachelle Bouchard, Roger Chartrand, André-Paul Lalonde, Jean Lemay, Martial Levac, Michel Pilon
- Student trustees: Sébastien Lauzon, Josiane Paquette
- Website: www.csdceo.ca

Conseil scolaire de district catholique de l'Est ontarien is the Roman Catholic separate, French language school board for the Southeastern region of Ontario. It is headquartered in L'Orignal, a largely French-speaking town in eastern Ontario, and serves the counties of Prescott and Russell and Stormont, Dundas and Glengarry. This school board has 32 schools in total, including 7 secondary schools.

== Elementary schools ==
- École élémentaire catholique Curé-Labrosse, Saint-Eugène
- École élémentaire catholique Du Rosaire, Saint-Pascal-Baylon
- École élémentaire catholique Elda-Rouleau, Alexandria
- École élémentaire catholique Embrun, Embrun
- École élémentaire catholique La Source, Moose Creek
- École élémentaire catholique Marie-Tanguay, Cornwall
- École élémentaire catholique Notre-Dame, Cornwall
- École élémentaire catholique Notre-Dame-du-Rosaire, Crysler
- École élémentaire catholique Paul VI, Hawkesbury
- École élémentaire catholique Sacré-Coeur, Bourget
- École élémentaire catholique Saint-Albert, Saint-Albert
- École élémentaire catholique Saint-Grégoire, Vankleek Hill
- École élémentaire catholique Saint-Isidore, Saint-Isidore
- École élémentaire catholique Saint-Jean-Baptiste, L'Orignal
- École élémentaire catholique Saint-Joseph, Russell
- École élémentaire catholique Saint-Joseph, Wendover
- École élémentaire catholique Saint-Mathieu, Hammond
- École élémentaire catholique Saint-Paul, Plantagenet
- École élémentaire catholique Saint-Viateur, Limoges
- École élémentaire catholique Saint-Victor, Alfred
- École élémentaire catholique Sainte-Félicité, Clarence Creek
- École élémentaire catholique Sainte-Lucie, Long Sault
- École élémentaire catholique Sainte-Trinité, Rockland
- École élémentaire catholique de Casselman, Casselman
- École élémentaire catholique de l'Ange-Gardien, North Lancaster

== Secondary schools ==
- École secondaire catholique Embrun, Embrun
- École secondaire catholique L'Escale, Rockland
- École secondaire catholique de Casselman, Casselman
- École secondaire catholique de Plantagenet, Plantagenet
- École secondaire catholique régionale de Hawkesbury, Hawkesbury
- École secondaire catholique La Citadelle, Cornwall
- École secondaire catholique Le Relais, Alexandria

== Former Schools ==
- École élémentaire catholique Saint viateur, LimogesThe Nation, ON K0A 2M0 they moved it to 205 Limoges Rd, Limoges, ON K0A 2M0
- École élémentaire catholique Saint-Gabriel, Cornwall 1335 Reneal St, Cornwall, ON K6H 3L5
- École élémentaire catholique Sainte-Thérèse, Cornwall1320 Lisieux St, Cornwall, ON K6J 4Z4
- École élémentaire catholique Sainte-Marguerite-Bourgeois, Hawkesbury (Closed in 2013) 82 bon pasteur St Hawkesbury on
- École Élémentaire Catholique Saint-Jean-Bosco, Hawkesbury (Closed in 2008) 429 Abbott St, Hawkesbury, ON K6A 2E2
- École St-croix at 114 Anthony St, Cornwall, ON K6H 5J9

(Closed 2004) Cornwall

== See also ==
- List of school districts in Ontario
- List of high schools in Ontario
