= École secondaire catholique L'Escale =

Catholic high school in Rockland, Ontario

Coordinates: 45.5493°N 75.2862°W

Location
- 1535 Park Avenue; Rockland, Ontario, K4K 1K6; Canada

Information
- School type: high school
- Denomination: Catholic School
- School board: CSDC de l'Est ontarien
- School number: 728330
- Enrollment: 645 (2024)
- Language: French
- Website: https://lescale.csdceo.ca/

L'École secondaire catholique l'Escale is a francophone Catholic high school located in Rockland, Ontario. It is managed by the Conseil scolaire de district catholique de l'Est ontarien..

== See also ==
- Education in Ontario
- List of secondary schools in Ontario
