= École secondaire catholique Embrun =

Coordinates: 45.27164°N 75.27458°W

L'École Secondaire Catholique d'Embrun

Location
- 1276 St-Jacques Road; Embrun, Ontario, K0A 1W0; Canada

Information
- School type: Public, Separate high school
- Religious affiliation: Catholic
- School board: Conseil des écoles catholiques du Centre-Est
- School number: 704920
- Grades: 7 - 12
- Language: French
- Website: esce.csdceo.ca

L'École Secondaire Catholique d'Embrun is a French-language Catholic high school located in Embrun, Ontario. It is managed by the Conseil scolaire de district catholique de l'Est ontarien.

== History ==
The ESCE's original location was situated next to the post office, across the road from Paroise St-Jacques and École Élémentaire Catholique Embrun`s Pavillon St-Jean. When the new building was erected, the original was demolished. This is why there is such a large parking lot for the post office.

The school's current location was built sometime in the 1960s, with the extension serving as a middle school being built around 2010.

== See also ==
- Education in Ontario
- List of secondary schools in Ontario
