= École secondaire catholique La Citadelle =

Coordinates: 45.0238°N 74.7133°W

L'École secondaire catholique La Citadelle is a French-language Catholic high school located in Cornwall, Ontario. It is managed by the Conseil scolaire de district catholique de l'Est ontarien.

== History ==
- In 1950, Saint-Laurent High School, the precursor to La Citadelle, was established to cater to the predominantly French-speaking population of Cornwall Township. This initial step towards French-language education was facilitated by Laurier Carrière, an inspector for bilingual schools at the time.
- In 1965, a modest concession was made with the introduction of geography and history courses taught in French.
- However, it wasn't until 1968, a year before the regionalization of school boards, that a group of dedicated individuals, including Jeannine Séguin, Clément Charette, Robert Brault, Bernard Bertrand, Rhéal Martel, Jules Renaud, and Fathers Bernard Guindon and C.E. Claude, appeared before the Cornwall Board of Education. They boldly proposed that Saint-Laurent High School be designated as a French school and presented a detailed plan to achieve this goal. While the Board accepted the principle of a French-language school, they delayed further action, opting to wait for the regionalization of the Stormont, Dundas, and Glengarry Board.
- The fight for an independent French secondary school in Cornwall intensified with the passage of Bill 141 and the establishment of French-language advisory committees. Despite facing resistance from the Board of Education, figures like Marcel Massé, Paul Rouleau, Claude Corbeil, and Bernard Bertrand, along with school trustees Albert Morin, Gérard Gauthier, Jean-Guy Gauthier, Jean Guindon, and Gérald Desjardins, tirelessly advocated for the cause.
- In September 1970, a surprising turn of events occurred. Overcrowding at Saint-Laurent school and coupled with the absence of planned construction within the city, the Board accepted the creation of two schools within the same building. This temporary relay system, based on the language of instruction, was intended to last for two years until a new high school could be built in the city's east end.
- In September 1972, the French section gained a separate administration with the appointment of Jeannine Séguin as principal and Jules Renaud as assistant principal.
- However, by the spring of 1973, tensions rose due to the proposed extension of the relay system, uncertainty regarding which student group would be relocated, and lobbying by a Saint-Lawrence High School committee to maintain their morning relay schedule. The mounting pressure prompted the student government of the French relay to take action.
- They formed a "committee of eight," rallied local organizations, and initiated a strike on March 14, 1973. This strike, which continued until the creation of Professor Thomas Symons' committee of inquiry on April 4, ultimately led to the Davis government's intervention. The Symons report, released on April 20, vindicated the local community's demands, and their slogan "We want it, we will have it" became a triumphant reality.
- In the aftermath, the school board targeted teachers in an act of retribution. Jacques Boyer and Paul Bezozzi were dismissed, and three other teachers faced disciplinary action for their alleged involvement in the student strike. This injustice sparked the formation of a united Franco-Ontarian front, encompassing AEFO, ACFO, AFCSO, API, and the Youth Department, to fight against this discrimination. Gérard Gauthier resigned from the Council in protest.
- On June 12, 1973, the school was officially named "La Citadelle," inspired by the writings of Saint-Exupéry, symbolizing the institution's significant role within the region.
- The school's dedication ceremony on 30 May 1975, was attended by prominent figures like Minister of Education Thomas Wells, Conseil Supérieur de langue française President Gérard Raymond, and Superintendent Jean-Paul Scott, a staunch advocate for Francophone rights. The celebrations, including a cultural event known as "La Nuit de La Citadelle," drew over a thousand participants.

== See also ==
- Education in Ontario
- List of secondary schools in Ontario
