= Garolou =

- Origin: Canada
- Genres: Folk rock, Progressive rock, French rock, Traditional music
- Years active: 1975–1983 / 1993–present
- Labels: Disques Francor Just a Memory Kébec-Disque London Records

Garolou is a Canadian progressive and folk-rock group. Formed in 1975 by French Canadians from Ontario and Quebec, the band was originally called Lougarou, but had to change its name after being sued by a dance troupe named Les Loups-garous. The group became popular not only in Quebec but across Canada, with its rock sound and its lyrics taken from French and French Canadian traditional songs.

In 1993, the band made a return supported by many concerts each year. The band performed at many music festivals such as the Festival International d'été de Québec and the Festival franco-ontarien. The band released in 1997 a live album called Réunion that captured Garolou's live experience and, two years later, a brand new album called Mémoire Vive.

Garolou has won two Félix Awards (ADISQ Gala) for the albums Garolou (1978) and Romancero (1980) and a Gold certification for the album Garolou (1978).

== Band members ==
=== Current members ===
- Marc Lalonde : Bass and vocals
- Michel Lalonde : Guitar and vocals
- Michel (Stan) Deguire : Drums and percussions
- Gaston Gagnon : Electric guitar and vocals
- Réginald Guay : Keyboards and vocals

=== Former members ===
- Gilles Beaudoin : Electric guitar and vocals (Garolou album)
- Georges Antoniak : Electric guitar and vocals (Lougarou album)
- Steven Naylor : Keyboards and vocals (Lougarou album)

=== Additional musicians (albums) ===
- Bobby Lalonde : Violin (Garolou, Romancero and Réunion albums)
- Reynald Wiseman : Saxophone (Romancero and Centre-Ville albums)

=== Additional musicians (concerts) ===
- Bobby Lalonde : Violin
- Bruno Dumont : Saxophone

== Discography ==
=== Albums ===
- 1999 Mémoire Vive (album)
- 1997 Réunion (live album)
- 1982 Centre-Ville (album)
- 1980 Romancero (album)
- 1978 Garolou (album)
- 1976 Lougarou (album)

=== Compilation albums ===
- 1991 Tableaux d'hier V.2
- 1991 Tableaux d'hier V.1
- 1981 Profil (album)

=== Other compilations ===
- 2000 Québec Rock, vol. 2 (CD)
- 1998 La nuit sur l'étang 1973-1998 (CD)
- 1981 Les Félix / Gagnants 1980 (CD)

== Popular songs ==
- "Ah toi belle hirondelle"
- "Germaine"
- "La belle Françoise"
- "À la claire fontaine"
- "Victoria"
- "La danse de la limonade"
- "La partance"
- "La complainte du Maréchal Biron"
- "Aux Illinois"
- "La Vendée"

== See also ==
- Garolou Wikipedia page (French)
- Music of Quebec
