= École secondaire catholique de Plantagenet =

Catholic high school in Plantagenet, Ontario

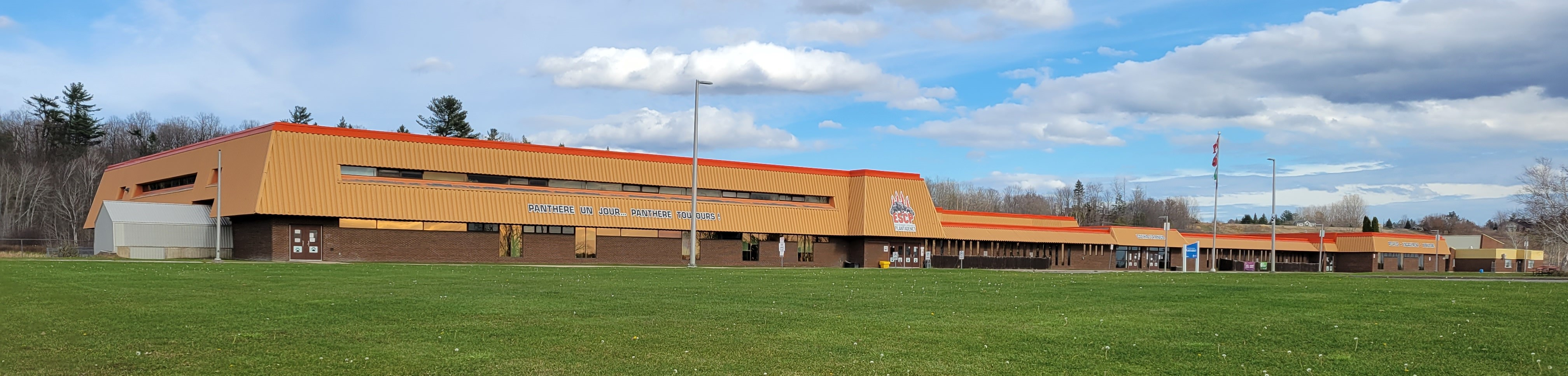
Exterior view of the École secondaire catholique de Plantagenet

L'École secondaire catholique de Plantagenet is a French-Language Catholic high school located in Plantagenet, Ontario. It is managed by the Conseil scolaire de district catholique de l'Est ontarien.

The school mascot is a black panther and the school colors are black, orange and white.

== Students ==
The school ranges between 350 and 450 students between grades 7 and 12. Middle school is grade 7 to 8 and high school is from grade 9 to 12. In addition, there are 70 members of the school support staff.

Based on Ontario's Ministry of Education, 95% of students who attend l'École secondaire catholique de Plantagenet speak French as their first official language.

Four local elementary schools feed into the École secondaire catholique de Plantagenet:

- École élémentaire catholique Saint-Victor from Alfred
- École élémentaire catholique Saint-Paul from Plantagenet
- École élémentaire catholique Du Rosaire from Saint-Pascal-Baylon
- École élémentaire catholique Saint-Joseph from Wendover.

== Parish ==
The church parish associated to the École secondaire catholique de Plantagenet is the Saint-Paul Parish located at 425 Water street in Plantagenet, Ontario.

== History ==
The high school was built in 1973 on land that borders on the Trans Canada Highway at the address 6150 County Road 17, Plantagenet, Ontario.

The structural engineer, Marcel Grand'Maitre, created the design, the architectural plans and the calculations for the École secondaire catholique de Plantagenet. He was born in 1932 and studied in science and engineering at the University of Ottawa and McGill University.

== See also ==
- Education in Ontario
- List of secondary schools in Ontario
