= École secondaire catholique régionale de Hawkesbury =

Coordinates: 45.6062°N 74.6246°W

École secondaire catholique régionale de Hawkesbury (ESCRH)

Location
- 572, Kitchener Street; Prescott-Russel; Hawkesbury, Ontario, K6A 2P3

Information
- Former name: École secondaire régionale de Hawkesbury (ESRH)
- School type: Secondary School
- Motto: Kodiak un jour, Kodiak toujours (Kodiak one day, Kodiak forever)
- Denomination: Catholic School
- School board: CSDCEO
- Grades: 7-12
- Enrollment: 380 (2024)
- Language: French
- Colours: Red, Gold & Blue
- Mascot: Kodiak

L'École secondaire catholique régionale de Hawkesbury (ESCRH) is a French-Language Catholic high school located in Hawkesbury, Ontario. It is managed by the Conseil scolaire de district catholique de l'Est ontarien.

== See also ==
- Education in Ontario
- List of secondary schools in Ontario
