= Russell High School (Ontario) =

Coordinates: 45.26498°N 75.363926°W

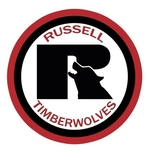

Location
- 982 North Russell Road; Russell, Ontario, K4R 1C8; Canada

Information
- School type: Public combined middle and High school
- Founded: 2004
- School district: Upper Canada District School Board
- Area trustee: Carol Carkner
- Principal: Dominique Betrand
- Grades: 7–12
- Gender: all
- Language: English & French Immersion
- Hours in school day: 6:20
- Houses: Exigo, Erubesco, Animus, Cura
- Colors: Red, white, silver and black
- Slogan: Character always
- Mascot: Timber wolves
- Rival: Ravens

Russell High School is a secondary school in Russell located under the jurisdiction of Upper Canada District School Board. In addition to Russell, students from Embrun, Casselman and Limoges attend Russell High School.

The school has the highest graduation rate in Upper Canada District School Board and one of the highest in Ontario, with 94% of Grade 12 students achieving a high school diploma in 2008.

== History ==
The school opened in 2004 because of the rapidly growing population of the Russell area as well as the growing proportion of anglophones in the area (most of the area historically being largely French-speaking). Beginning in 2004, the school added one grade each year. This process was finished in 2007 with the addition of Grade Twelve.

The school's first principal was provincial curling champion Bryan Cochrane, who remained principal until June 2009 when he retired. He was replaced by Jeffrey Curtis, who was principal from September 2009 to June 2012. Shelly Corlyon, who was the school's vice principal from 2004 to 2010, became the school's 3rd principal in September 2012.

=== Addition ===
In June 2007, the provincial government granted funds to expand the school building. Work began in August 2007. The bulk of the construction was completed by the end of 2008 and the new addition was opened to students on January 31, 2009.

=== Inclusivity and diversity ===
Russell High's PRIDE alliance (GSA) has been very active in recent years, launching multiple campaigns for acceptance and diversity within the school, as well as hosting forums and workshops attended by students and faculty from surrounding schools. In 2015, the school introduced an all-gender washroom, something that was still very rare in North America at the time.

On January 12, 2017, Russell High School hosted more than 50 students for the third annual Gender and Sexuality Alliance (GSA) Empowerment Day. During this meeting students from seven schools met to discuss LGBTQ+ inclusivity related topics including gender-neutral washrooms and change areas, how to deal with homophobia and transphobia, as well as bullying in these areas.

Russell High School has also started two new inclusivity initiative called “Web” and “Link Crew”, where older-grade students are paired with students in a lower grade and take on a mentor role. “Web” (also known as the Where Everyone Belongs leadership program) is for tenth-grade students who pair up with seventh-grade students who are new to the school. Their goal is to make the transition from elementary to secondary school easier for the young students. “Link Crew” is an initiative where twelfth-grade Link Crew member students are assigned small groups of ninth-grade students to help them make the transition from middle to high school and answer any questions they may have, whether it be socially or academically. Link Crew has been proven beneficial to the young student first entering high school, to help them break the stigma of high school being a big and scary place.

== Sports ==
For a smaller scale high school, Russell High School has an impressive amount of interest in sports program. There are three age divisions for students: Grade 7–8, Grade 9–10 (alternatively called 'Junior'), Grade 11–12 (alternatively called Senior), with the occasional 'Varsity' (Grade 9–12) aged team. Sports are offered for both girls and boys throughout the entire school year. Sports teams include: girls' and boys' soccer, hockey, volleyball, basketball, tennis, badminton, track and field and softball. Additionally, there has been a varsity girls' rugby team for over five years. The number of teams varies from school year to school year, depending on the level of interest from students.

In January 2016, Russell High School made a $621 donation to the Canadian Cancer Society by purchasing the jersey of a former RHS student, Ryan Cranford, who has gone on to start a junior hockey career with the Ontario Hockey League's team, the Kingston Frontenacs.

== Arts ==
=== Music ===
Russell High School offers students the chance to learn the skill of playing a wide variety of instruments. Music classes are available to any student who is interested in music theory and related topics or interested in woodwind, brass, percussion and string bass instruments. Extracurricular opportunities also exist for those who are interested. These opportunities come in the form of after school band (which also awards the participating student with a school credit) and/or Glee Club. Opportunities are always given to those interested in performing in front of audiences.

=== Drama ===
The dramatic arts department at Russell High School allows students many opportunities to participate in the dramatic process of performing – collaborating creating and/or performing as well as learn about different genres of theatre. Students who may not be interested in performing in front of audiences also have the chance to learn about the backstage processes of theatre, like lighting and sound support. Each year, students have the opportunity to perform not only for their fellow students, but also for audiences from the local elementary school, Russell Public School, as well as audiences from the local retirement home, Russell Meadows. Each year the school allows a selected cast of students to travel to the annual “Dramafest", where students are able to showcase their talents to a broader audience, including students from other schools, and have the opportunity to win awards for their production.

== Specialist high skills major ==
Russell High School offers a unique program called the Specialist High Skills Major program, where students interested in pursuing a career as an automotive service technician, heavy truck and coach technician, small engine technician or a related field. The classroom is actually a shop, where students work on real automotives, allowing them to apply the knowledge they have learned in the theoretical portions of the class to target and problem solve the issues the automotive they are working on is facing. Taking this class allows them to get hands-on skills and the needed certification for their chosen field, while giving the students credits towards their graduation. Students also receive important WHMIS (Workplace Hazardous Materials Information System) training, which teaches them how to stay safe in the workplace. This program is extremely beneficial for interested students as they will be graduating with certification that is recognized in the economic and apprenticeship sector and helps them be a “step ahead” of others once their schooling is completed.

== See also ==
- Education in Ontario
- List of secondary schools in Ontario
