= Russell, Ontario (community) =

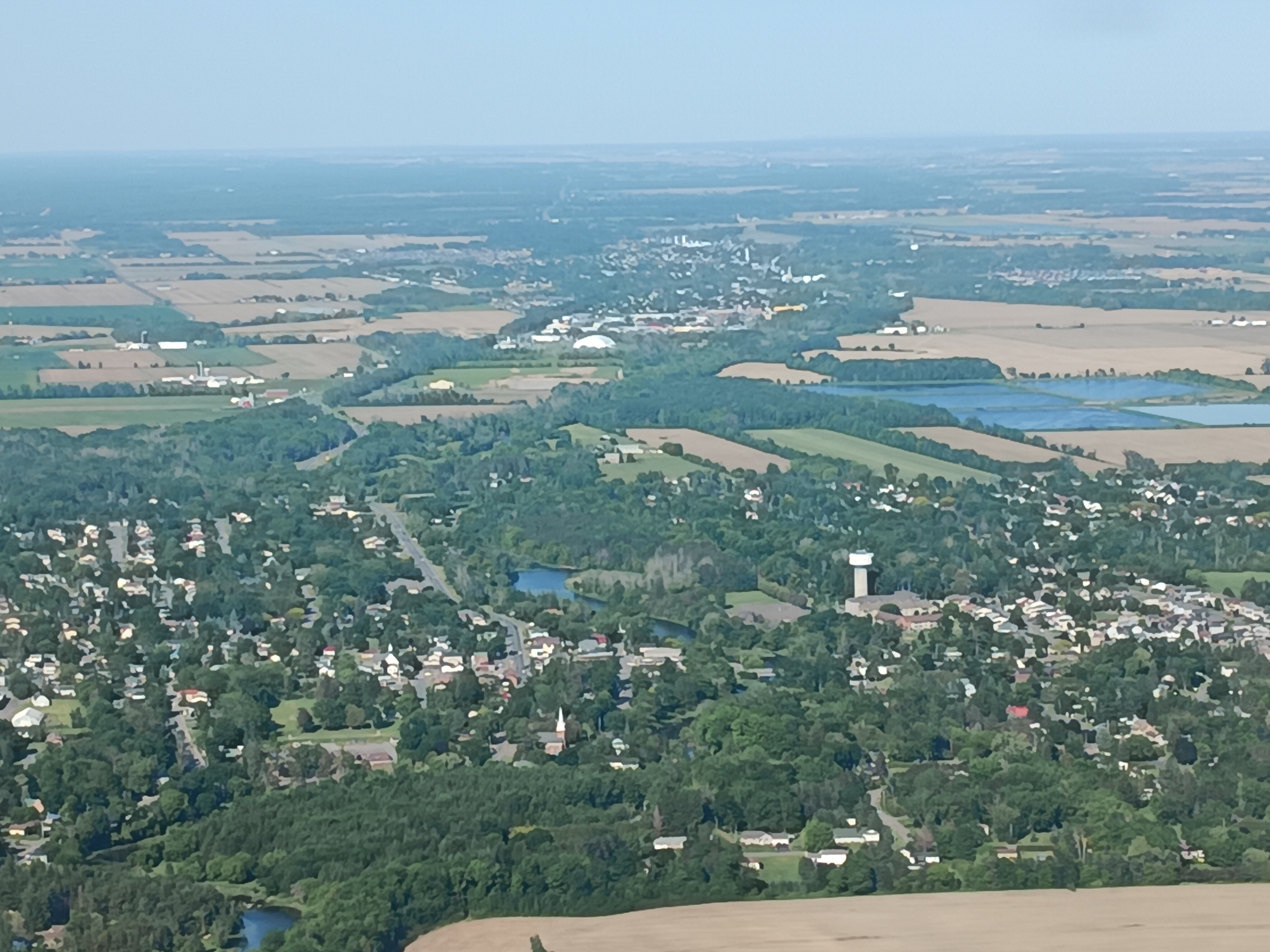
- Motto: Pax Et Prosperitas (Peace And Prosperity)
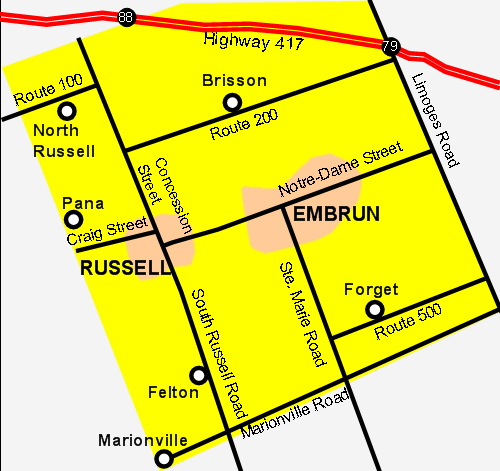
- Map of Russell Township with Russell village on the left
- Coordinates: 45°15′30″N 75°21′30″W
- Country: Canada
- Province: Ontario
- Counties: Prescott and Russell
- Township: Russell Township
- Settlement: 1845
- Named: 1857
- Police village: 1898

Government
  - Mayor: Pierre Leroux
  - Governing Body: Russell Township
  - MPs: Francis Drouin

Area
  - Total: 3.82 km^{2} (1.47 sq mi)
- Elevation: 60 m (200 ft)

Population (2016 Census)
  - Total: 4,464
  - Density: 1,169.8/km^{2} (3,030/sq mi)
- Time zone: UTC-5 (EST)
  - Summer (DST): UTC-4 (EDT)
- Area code: 613 343

Russell is a police village that is part of Russell Township in the United Counties of Prescott and Russell in Eastern Ontario, Canada. It is located immediately east of Ottawa, the city limits of which are just over 2 km west of Russell. Ottawa's downtown core is about 40 km (25mi) northwest of Russell.

The 2016 Census stated that the community had a population of 4,464, making it the second largest community in the township of Russell (Russell's neighbour to the east, Embrun, is the largest community in Russell Township). The vast majority of its residents work in the city of Ottawa, making Russell a true bedroom community for commuters to Ottawa. Agriculture is the main industry in and immediately around the village.

The town produces a large number of hockey prospects for development leagues such as the OHL, OJHL, and NCJHL. The most notable contributions are to the Embrun Panthers Jr. C hockey team.

The town has a significant number of schools for its size – English Catholic Elementary (Mother Teresa Catholic School) and Secondary (St. Thomas Aquinas Catholic High School), English Public Elementary and Secondary (Russell High School) and French Elementary school (École Saint-Joseph) .

Russell also has a summer swimming pool, a skating arena, a library, an all-weather running track and a curling rink. The village also has its firehall on the south end. Russell is policed by the Ontario Provincial Police (OPP). The Russell Watch Program is a community watch where volunteers patrol the village as a second set of eyes and ears for the OPP. Patrols are mostly made during the evening and into the late night. Commercial, recreational, and residential areas are all monitored frequently after dusk.

The village has practicing lawyers, doctors, dentists and other professionals. It also has grocery store, pharmacy, garage, restaurants and many little shops.

The Castor River (‘castor’ meaning “beaver” in French) runs through the town in summer and offers a flat trail for snowmobiles during the winter.

The village passed a local bylaw requiring all commercial signage to be bilingual. This bylaw is being challenged by many, in one case in court.

Russell is a predominantly English-speaking community, although with a sizeable French-speaking minority. 87% of the community speaks English at home, while 11% speak French at home.

The travel time to the nearest built-up areas of Ottawa is typically 20–25 minutes. In the rush hour it can take up to one hour to reach downtown Ottawa, and much more to reach Ottawa boroughs west of the core zone.

In terms of ethnic origin, the people of Russell are mainly of Anglo-Celtic descent, although there are significant populations of Dutch, French, and German descent.

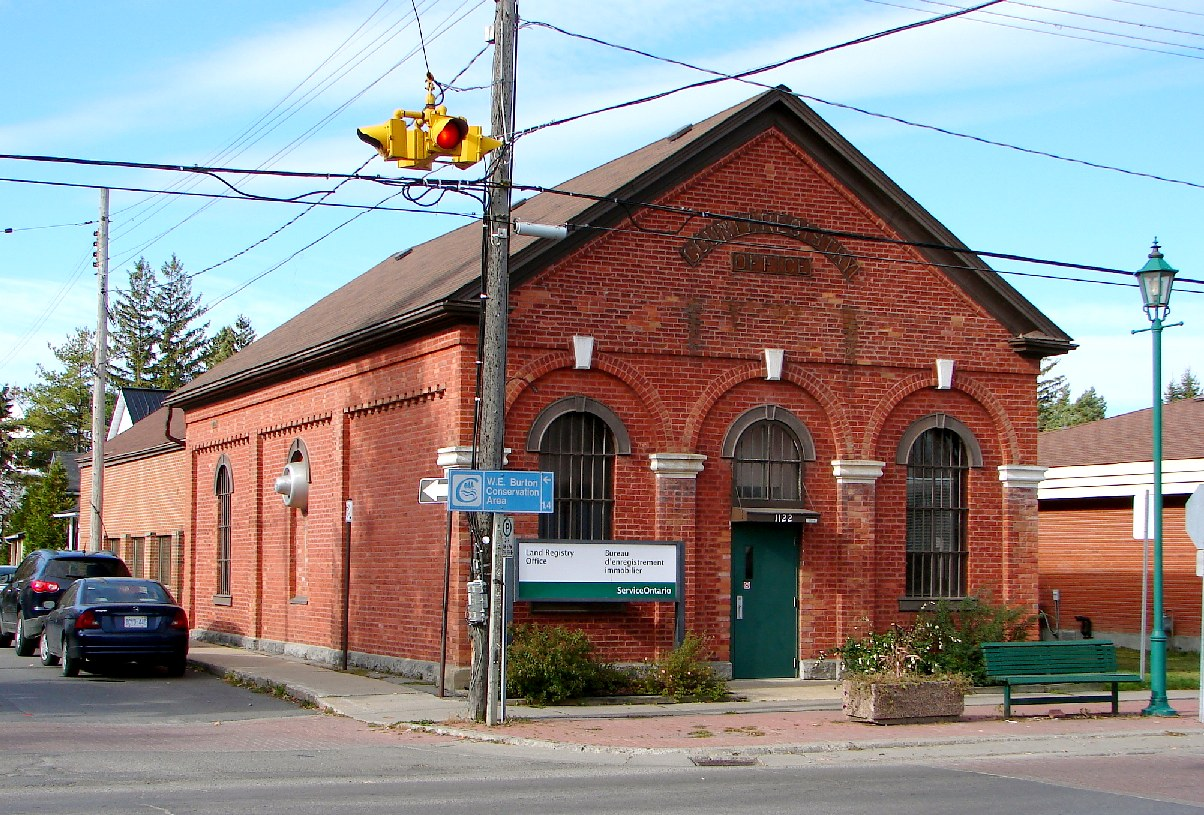
Historic Land Registry Office in the centre of Russell.
