= Brisson, Ontario =

Former locality in Ontario, Canada

Brisson
- Locality (former)
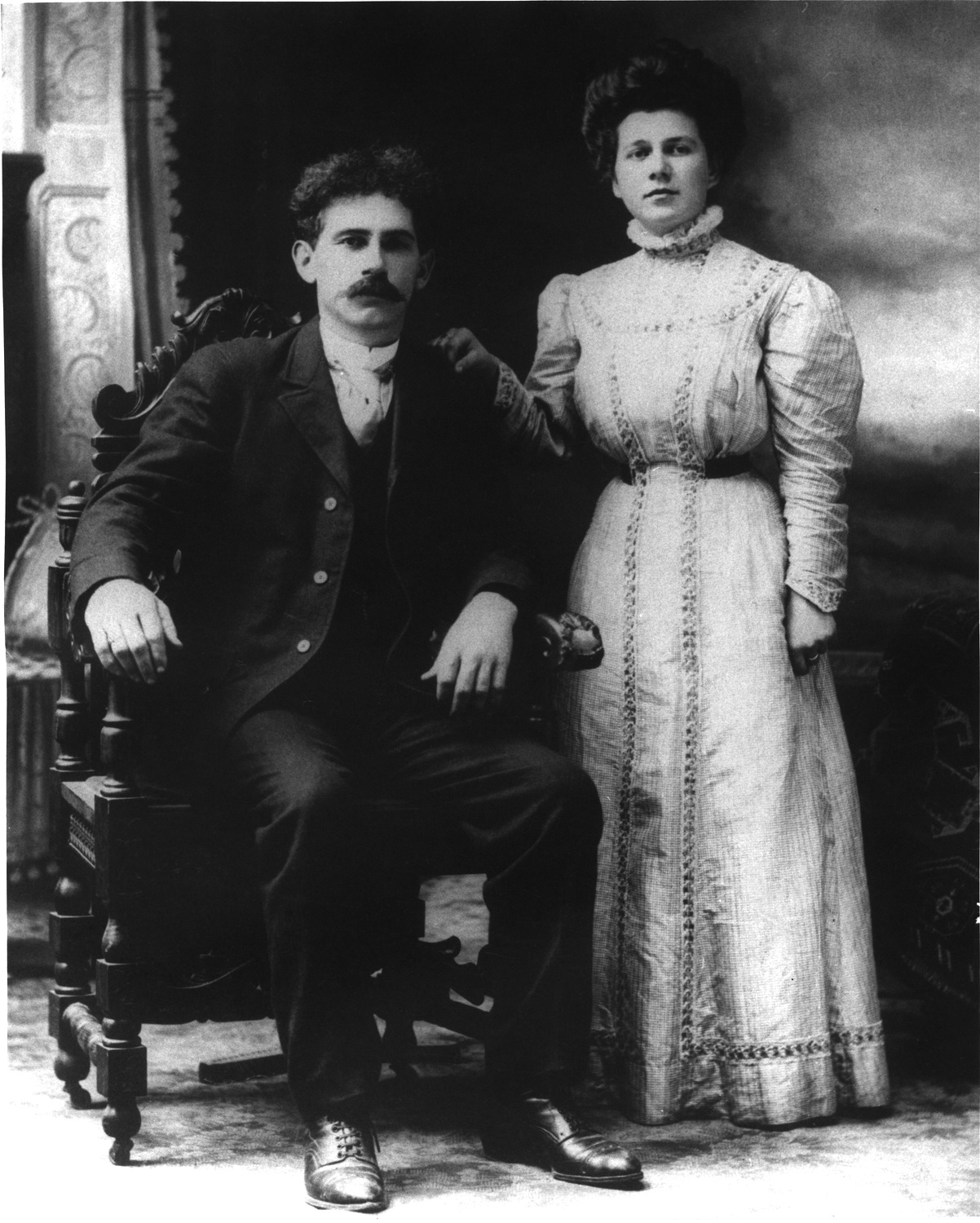
- Parfait Brisson and Aurore Nadeau, 1908
- Interactive map of Brisson
- Coordinates: 45.299790°N 75.327896°W
- Country: Canada
- Province: Ontario
- County: United Counties of Prescott and Russell
- Township: Russell
- Post office opened: 1907
- Post office closed: 1918
- Founder: Parfait Brisson
- Named for: Parfait Brisson

Brisson is a small place at the intersection of St Guillaume Rd and Route 200 near Embrun in Russell Township, Ontario, Canada. It was the location of the general store of Parfait Brisson with a post office. Although still marked on some maps and still listed as a locality by Statistics Canada, the community no longer exists, and is not recognized by the township of Russell. Brisson had its own post office from 1907 to 1918. Parfait Brisson was the first postmaster from 1907 to 1916 followed by Arthur Bergeron.

Parfait Brisson, born Joseph Prosper Brisson on 16 May 1881 in Embrun, is the son of Joseph Brisson and Marie Lanoix. Parfait Brisson married on 27 Feb 1908 in Embrun, Aurore Nadeau, daughter of Onésime Nadeau and Georgianna Bouvier. Parfait Brisson was also the owner of a cheese factory in Embrun with P. O. address Brisson.

== See also ==
- Russell, Ontario
- Ghost towns in Ontario
- List of communities in Ontario
- United Counties of Prescott and Russell
