= LGS =

LGS may refer to:

== Education ==
- Lahore Grammar School
- Lanark Grammar School
- Langley Grammar School
- Larne Grammar School
- Leeds Grammar School
- Leicester Grammar School
- Limavady Grammar School
- Loughborough Grammar School

== Entertainment ==
- Looking Glass Studios, a defunct computer game company
- La Grande Sophie, a French singer-songwriter

== Science ==
- Laser guide star, an adaptive optics instrument used in astronomy
- Latitudinal gradients in species diversity
- Leaky gut syndrome, an intestinal dysfunction
- LGS Innovations, a high-tech private company and former division of Bell Labs
- Lennox–Gastaut syndrome, a type of epilepsy

== Software ==
- Liberty Steel Group, a British industrial and metals company
