= Rockland, Ontario =

Rockland
- Community
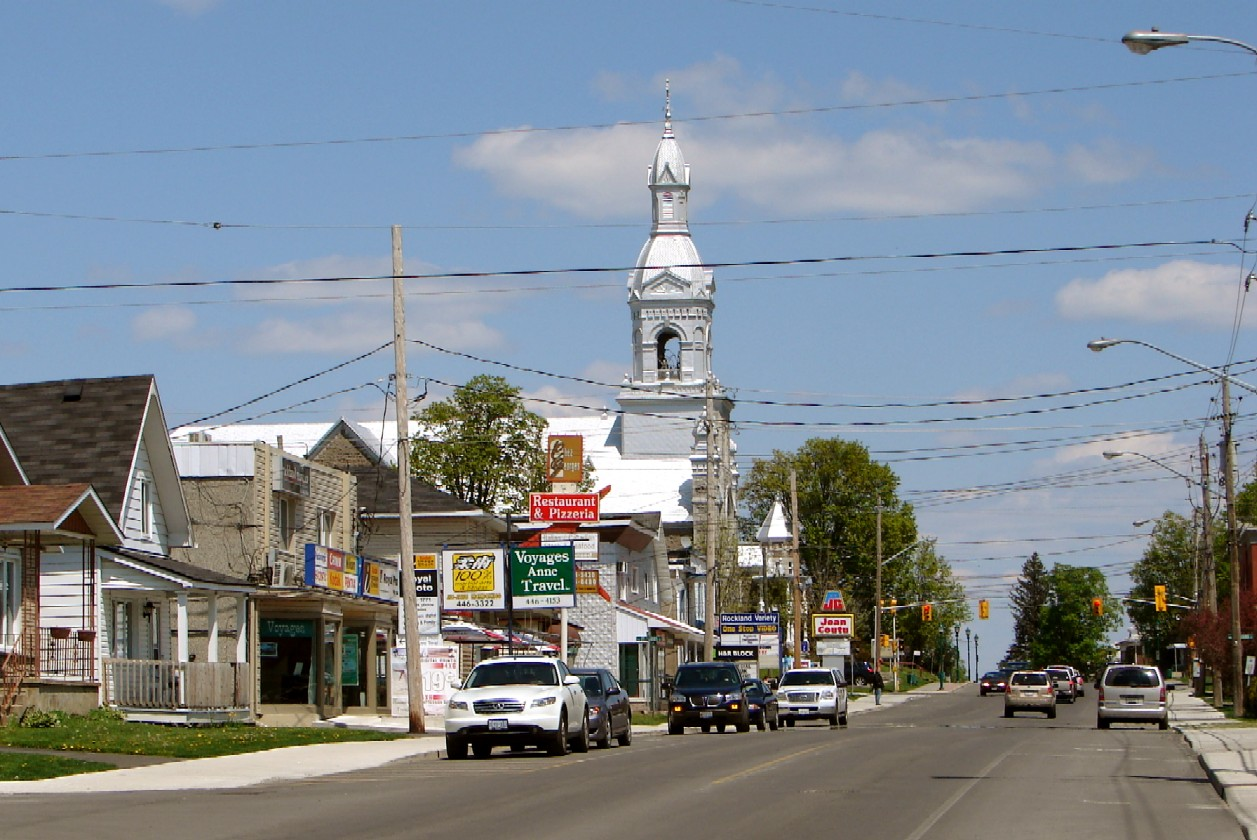
- Laurier Street

- Location of Rockland in southern Ontario
- Coordinates: 45°33′N 75°17′W
- Country: Canada
- Province: Ontario
- County: Prescott and Russell
- Municipality: Clarence-Rockland
- Founded: 1868 (as parish)
- Incorporated: 1908 (as town)

Government
  - Mayor: Mario Zanth
  - Representatives: Stéphane Sarrazin, MPP; Giovanna Mingarelli, MP

Area
  - Land: 8.15 km^{2} (3.15 sq mi)

Population (2021)
  - Total: 13,625
  - Density: 1,671.1/km^{2} (4,328/sq mi)
- Time zone: UTC−05:00 (EST)
  - Summer (DST): UTC−04:00 (EDT)
- Postal code: K4A, K4K, K1E
- Area codes: 613, 343

Rockland is a bilingual community located about 30 kilometres (19 mi) east of downtown Ottawa, Ontario, Canada, part of the city of Clarence-Rockland. Rockland has a population of 13,625 (2021), making up roughly half the population of the municipality. It is home to a large part of the francophone community in Eastern Ontario along with the towns situated to the east and the Ottawa suburb of Orleans to the west.

It was a separate town until January 1, 1998, when it amalgamated with Clarence Township to form the City of Clarence-Rockland.

== History ==
The Clarence region began growing in 1840 with the development of the road from L'Orignal to Bytown. Before then, farmers relentlessly cleared wooded space to be able to cultivate land, their only means of survival. In 1868, a young entrepreneur, William Cameron Edwards, decided to establish a sawmill at the McCaul point. The opening of a link to the Grand Trunk Railway followed in 1888 to allow wood and merchandise to be transported. Edwards, who held timber rights in the area and was also the first postmaster, named the area for the rocky nature of its landscape. The post office dates from 1869.

In 1889, the mission served by the priest Caron from Clarence-Creek became a parish. The first priest of the new parish was Siméon Hudon, native of Québec City. The first school opened in 1875 while the first high-school opened in 1905. In 1908, Rockland was incorporated as a town.

Construction of a second railroad in 1908 linking Ottawa and Hawkesbury greatly promoted population. In effect, for 75 cents (return) people could go to Ottawa to run errands and return in the same day. The woodmill owned by W. C. Edwards closed in 1926, as a result of the economic turmoil following the First World War. A large part of the population moved to the province of Quebec to find employment in the woodmills in Hull and Gatineau. Economic recovery began in 1939 with the start of the Second World War, and the return of soldiers after the war brought an increase in population. Construction of homes increased rapidly creating a need for expanded water services, electricity and a sewer system implemented in 1964.

Throughout the 1970s, Rockland was a small community with a population of about 3,500 people. Since the turn of the millennium, it has seen rapid growth in housing development. Prior to 2000, the number of new homes built were below 60 or 70 annually, but in the period between 2000 and 2010, the total number of new homes built was 2185.

== Demographics ==
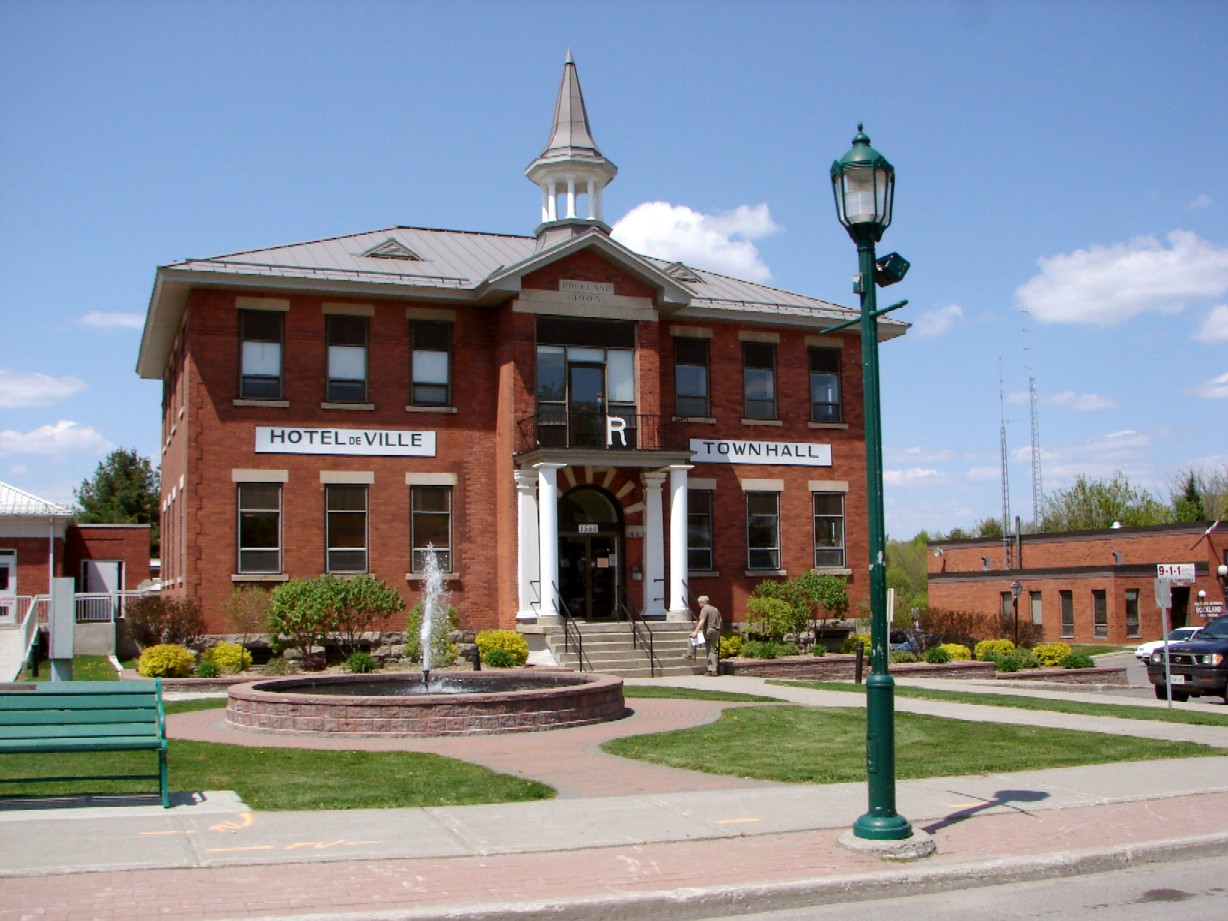
Town hall

Historical census populations – Rockland, Ontario

Year	Pop.	±%
1891	1,465	—
1901	1,998	+36.4%
1911	3,397	+70.0%
1921	3,496	+2.9%
1931	2,118	−39.4%
1941	2,040	−3.7%
1951	2,348	+15.1%

Year	Pop.	±%
1956	2,757	+17.4%
1961	3,037	+10.2%
1966	3,513	+15.7%
1971	3,649	+3.9%
1976	3,930	+7.7%
1981	3,961	+0.8%
1986	4,894	+23.6%

Year	Pop.	±%
1991	6,771	+38.4%
1996	8,070	+19.2%
2006	9,210	+14.1%
2011	10,980	+19.2%
2016	12,399	+12.9%
2021	13,625	+9.9%

2011 and 2016 Population figures based on revised counts. Population figures after 1998 are for Rockland [population centre].
Source: Statistics Canada

== Leisure ==
In 2008, Rockland opened a 45,000-square-foot (4,200 m^{2}) recreation centre, featuring a library, a YMCA, indoor swimming pool, and gymnasium, and theatre.

A sporting event and training centre opened in Rockland in 2011, featuring ice rinks, soccer fields, a baseball diamond and a running track. It is a national training facility for Hockey Canada.

The Rockland Golf Club is located here.

Parks include Du Moulin Park, with boat ramps to the Ottawa River, and the Simon park, with a baseball field.

== Transportation ==
The community is served by Prescott-Russell Road 17, a two-lane road that by-passes the centre of the community to its north, though multiple businesses including big-box stores have been built along the roadway over the past several years. Heading west, it becomes Ottawa Road 174 heading towards Orleans and downtown Ottawa via Highway 417. Eastward it connects to municipalities such as Wendover, Alfred, Plantagenet and Hawkesbury. Prior to the downgrading of multiple roads across the province by the Ontario government during the 1990s, it was known as Ontario Highway 17 east of the Highway 417 and 174 split. During the past several years, there have been calls to widen Highway 174 between Trim Road and Rockland although the city of Ottawa had previously refused funding for the highway. However, some Ottawa councillors as well as the federal government have expressed support for the widen due to safety reasons and multiple fatal crashes.

The community was also served by a commuter bus line operated by Leduc Bus Lines which offered 10–12 trips from the village to downtown Ottawa and Gatineau during rush hour. However, this service has been indefinitely suspended since 2020 citing health concerns and lack of demand.

The community of Rockland expressed wishes to establish OC Transpo connections by the end of 2015 in hopes of exchanging Ottawa city culture with the rural French community that inhabits Rockland. However, given Rockland being outside the service area of OC Transpo, this connection has yet to be established.

== Education ==
There are a variety of schools in Rockland including Anglophone public, Francophone public, Anglophone Catholic, and Francophone Catholic.

=== Elementary ===
- Rockland Public School (RKPS)
- St. Patrick Catholic Elementary School
- École élémentaire catholique Sainte-Trinité
- École Carrefour Jeunesse

=== High school ===
- École secondaire catholique L'Escale
- Rockland District High School (RDHS)
- St. Francis Xavier Catholic High School (St. FX) located in Hammond but attended by many students from Rockland
- Canadian International Hockey Academy

=== Adult ===
- Eastern Ontario Education and Training Centre

=== Music ===
- Rockland Music School
- Domenic's Academy of Music

== Notable people ==
- Bianca Borgella, para-athlete
- Maxime Filion, Professional soccer player
