= Canadian federal election results in Eastern Ontario =

Seats obtained by party since 1979

Liberal
Conservative
Alliance (defunct)
Progressive Conservative (defunct)

Electoral history (1917–1979) including Ottawa
Year	Results
1974	
1972	
1968	
1965	
1963	
1962	
1958	
1957	
1953	
1949	
1945	
1940	
1935	
1930	
1926	
1925	
1921	
1917	

Canadian federal elections have provided the following results in Eastern Ontario.

== Regional profile ==
This mostly rural region has historically split between the Liberals and conservative parties (first the Progressive Conservatives and then the Canadian Alliance), though vote-splitting led to a Liberal sweep in 1993 and 1997. The 2003 merger of the Progressive Conservatives and Canadian Alliance into the new Conservative Party of Canada, however, saw the region swing rightward. The Conservatives gradually increased their seat numbers from 2004 onward, and by 2006 only Kingston and the Islands, containing the region’s largest urban area of Kingston and its prominent universities, remained in Liberal hands.

In the 2011 election, the region was affected by the nationwide surge in support for the NDP. Although the NDP failed to win any seats in the area, they increased their popular vote share in all seven of the region's ridings, and won second place in three of the area's ridings.

The Liberal wave that swept through Ontario in 2015 saw the Liberals take four seats in eastern Ontario, mostly in more urbanized areas (Kingston, Belleville, Hawkesbury). The Conservatives won the other four.

The 2019 election saw the Conservatives regain Hastings—Lennox and Addington, with the other seats remaining unchanged, resulting in the Conservatives winning five seats to the Liberals three.

=== Votes by party throughout time ===
Election	Liberal	Conservative	New Democratic	Green	People's	PC	Reform / Alliance	Others
1979	128,691; 39.2%	—N/a	49,161; 15.0%	—N/a	—N/a	149,774; 45.6%	—N/a	785; 0.2%
1980	138,038; 44.1%	—N/a	47,772; 15.3%	—N/a	—N/a	125,705; 40.2%	—N/a	890; 0.3%
1984	123,295; 35.4%	—N/a	46,852; 13.4%	826; 0.2%	—N/a	175,060; 50.2%	—N/a	2,635; 0.8%
1988	180,011; 46.3%	—N/a	54,825; 14.1%	—N/a	—N/a	136,666; 35.2%	—N/a	8,433; 2.2%
1993	242,072; 57.3%	—N/a	13,860; 3.3%	871; 0.2%	—N/a	79,597; 18.8%	65,421; 15.5%	20,508; 4.9%
1997	191,132; 48.6%	—N/a	25,181; 6.4%	2,884; 0.7%	—N/a	88,879; 22.6%	81,845; 20.8%	3,225; 0.8%
2000	173,608; 45.8%	—N/a	17,164; 4.5%	4,855; 1.3%	—N/a	60,770; 16.0%	119,464; 31.5%	2,112; 0.6%
2004	139,558; 38.3%	156,649; 43.0%	45,666; 12.5%	18,243; 5.0%	—N/a	—N/a	—N/a	2,749; 0.8%
2006	123,177; 31.6%	183,758; 47.2%	58,419; 15.0%	19,322; 5.0%	—N/a	—N/a	—N/a	3,330; 0.9%
2008	94,954; 26.5%	183,114; 51.2%	47,897; 13.4%	27,801; 7.8%	—N/a	—N/a	—N/a	3,255; 0.9%
2011	84,611; 22.3%	199,170; 52.4%	72,036; 18.9%	13,574; 3.6%	—N/a	—N/a	—N/a	10,609; 2.8%
2015	202,326; 43.9%	186,378; 40.4%	51,641; 11.2%	13,239; 2.9%	—N/a	—N/a	—N/a	7,772; 1.7%
2019	162,540; 33.7%	200,345; 41.6%	72,806; 15.1%	32,449; 6.7%	10,193; 2.1%	—N/a	—N/a	3,009; 0.6%
2021	155,014; 32.1%	207,061; 42.9%	78,859; 16.3%	11,483; 2.4%	28,562; 5.9%	—N/a	—N/a	1,525; 0.3%
2025	257,728; 47.4%	257,952; 47.4%	18,427; 3.4%	6,399; 1.2%	1,741; 0.3%	—N/a	—N/a	1,750; 0.3%

Liberal Conservative New Democratic Green People's	Progressive Conservative (defunct) Alliance (defunct) Reform (defunct)

== 2019 ==
Electoral district	Candidates						Incumbent
Electoral district	Liberal	Conservative	NDP	Green	PPC	Other	Incumbent
Bay of Quinte	Neil Ellis; 24,099; 39.16%	Tim Durkin; 22,650; 36.80%	Stephanie Bell; 9,851; 16.01%	Danny Celovsky; 3,740; 6.08%	Paul Bordonaro; 1,207; 1.96%		Neil Ellis
Glengarry—Prescott—Russell	Francis Drouin; 31,293; 47.56%	Pierre Lemieux; 23,660; 35.96%	Konstantine Malakos; 6,851; 10.41%	Marthe Lépine	Jean-Jacques Desgranges; 1,174; 1.78%	Darcy Neal Donnelly (Libert.); 262; 0.40% Daniel John Fey (Ind.); 239; 0.36% Marc-Antoine Gagnier (Rhino.); 199; 0.30%	Francis Drouin
Hastings—Lennox and Addington	Mike Bossio; 19,721; 37.14%	Derek Sloan; 21,968; 41.38%	David Tough; 6,984; 13.15%	Sari Watson; 3,114; 5.87%	Adam L. E. Gray; 1,307; 2.46%		Mike Bossio
Kingston and the Islands	Mark Gerretsen; 31,205; 45.76%	Ruslan Yakoviychuk; 13,304; 19.51%	Barrington Walker; 15,856; 23.25%	Candice Christmas; 6,059; 8.89%	Andy Brooke; 1,769; 2.59%		Mark Gerretsen
Lanark—Frontenac—Kingston	Kayley Kennedy; 15,441; 24.71%	Scott Reid; 30,077; 48.14%	Satinka Schilling; 8,835; 14.14%	Stephen Kotze; 7,011; 11.22%	Matthew Barton; 1,117; 1.79%		Scott Reid
Leeds—Grenville—Thousand Islands and Rideau Lakes	Josh Bennett; 15,482; 26.49%	Michael Barrett; 28,630; 48.98%	Michelle Taylor; 8,201; 14.03%	Lorraine Rekmans; 5,152; 8.81%	Evan Hindle; 988; 1.69%		Michael Barrett
Renfrew—Nipissing—Pembroke	Ruben Marini; 11,532; 19.56%	Cheryl Gallant; 31,080; 52.72%	Eileen Jones-Whyte; 8,786; 14.90%	Ian Pineau; 3,230; 5.48%	David Ainsworth; 1,463; 2.48%	Robert Cherrin (VCP); 358; 0.61% Dan Criger (Ind.); 1,125; 1.91% Jonathan Davis (Ind.); 200; 0.34% Dheerendra Kumar (Ind.); 917; 1.56% Stefan Klietsch (Libert.); 266; 0.45%	Cheryl Gallant
Stormont—Dundas—South Glengarry	Heather Megill; 13,767; 25.63%	Eric Duncan; 28,976; 53.95%	Kelsey Catherine Schmitz; 7,674; 14.29%	Raheem Aman; 2,126; 3.96%	Sabile Trimm; 1,168; 2.17%		Guy Lauzon†$

== 2015 ==
Electoral district	Candidates					Incumbent
Electoral district	Conservative	NDP	Liberal	Green	Other	Incumbent
Bay of Quinte	Jodie Jenkins; 19,781; 34.27%	Terry Cassidy; 7,001; 12.13%	Neil Ellis; 29,281; 50.74%	Rachel Nelems; 1,278; 2.21%	Trueman Tuck (Ind.); 372; 0.64%	Daryl Kramp‡ Prince Edward—Hastings
Glengarry—Prescott— Russell	Pierre Lemieux; 23,367; 36.41%	Normand Laurin; 5,087; 7.93%	Francis Drouin; 34,189; 53.28%	Genevieve Malouin-Diraddo; 1,153; 1.80%	Jean-Serge Brisson (Libert.); 377; 0.59%	Pierre Lemieux
Hastings— Lennox and Addington	Daryl Kramp; 20,879; 41.93%	Betty Bannon; 6,348; 12.75%	Mike Bossio; 21,104; 42.38%	Cam Mather; 1,466; 2.94%		New District
Kingston and the Islands	Andy Brooke; 14,928; 22.70%	Daniel Beals; 11,185; 17.01%	Mark Gerretsen; 36,421; 55.37%	Nathan Townend; 2,933; 4.46%	Luke McAllister (Libert.); 305; 0.46%	Ted Hsu†
Lanark—Frontenac—Kingston	Scott Reid; 27,399; 47.87%	John Fenik; 8,073; 14.10%	Phil Archambault; 19,325; 33.76%	Anita Payne; 2,025; 3.54%	Mark Budd (Libert.); 418; 0.73%	Scott Reid; Lanark—Frontenac—Lennox and Addington
Leeds—Grenville—Thousand Islands and Rideau Lakes	Gord Brown; 26,738; 47.38%	Margaret Andrade; 4,722; 8.37%	Mary Jean McFall; 22,888; 40.56%	Lorraine A. Rekmans; 2,088; 3.70%		Gord Brown; Leeds—Grenville
Renfrew—Nipissing— Pembroke	Cheryl Gallant; 26,195; 45.83%	Dan McCarthy; 4,893; 8.56%	Jeff Lehoux; 18,666; 32.66%	Stefan Klietsch; 1,105; 1.93%	Hector Clouthier (Ind.); 6,300; 11.02%	Cheryl Gallant
Stormont—Dundas— South Glengarry	Guy Lauzon; 27,091; 51.05%	Patrick Burger; 4,332; 8.16%	Bernadette Clement; 20,452; 38.54%	Elaine Kennedy; 1,191; 2.24%		Guy Lauzon

== 2011 ==
Electoral district	Candidates					Incumbent
Electoral district	Conservative	Liberal	NDP	Green	Other	Incumbent
Glengarry—Prescott— Russell	Pierre Lemieux; 28,174; 48.80%	Julie Bourgeois; 17,705; 30.67%	Denis A. Séguin; 9,608; 16.64%	Sylvie Lemieux; 2,049; 3.55%	Jean-Serge Brisson (Libert.); 194; 0.34%	Pierre Lemieux
Kingston and the Islands	Alicia Gordon; 21,189; 34.93%	Ted Hsu; 23,842; 39.31%	Daniel Beals; 13,065; 21.54%	Eric Walton; 2,561; 4.22%		Peter Milliken†
Lanark—Frontenac— Lennox and Addington	Scott Reid; 33,754; 57.27%	David Remington; 9,940; 16.86%	Doug Smyth; 12,174; 20.65%	John Baranyi; 2,702; 4.58%	Ralph Lee (Ind.); 370; 0.63%	Scott Reid
Leeds—Grenville	Gord Brown; 29,991; 60.81%	Marjory Loveys; 7,839; 15.89%	Matthew Gabriel; 9,033; 18.31%	Mary Slade; 2,460; 4.99%		Gord Brown
Prince Edward—Hastings	Daryl Kramp; 29,062; 53.25%	Peter Tinsley; 10,230; 18.75%	Michael McMahon; 12,940; 23.71%	Patrick Larkin; 1,887; 3.46%	Tim Hickey (Ind.); 283 0.52%	Daryl Kramp
Prince Edward—Hastings	Daryl Kramp; 29,062; 53.25%	Peter Tinsley; 10,230; 18.75%	Michael McMahon; 12,940; 23.71%	Patrick Larkin; 1,887; 3.46%	Andrew Skinner (PC); 171 0.31%	Daryl Kramp
Renfrew—Nipissing— Pembroke	Cheryl Gallant; 27,462; 53.43%	Christine Tabbert; 6,545; 12.73%	Eric Burton; 6,903; 13.43%	Rosanne Van Schie; 877; 1.71%	Hec Clouthier (Ind.); 9,611; 18.70%	Cheryl Gallant
Stormont—Dundas— South Glengarry	Guy Lauzon; 29,538; 62.12%	Bernadette Clement; 8,510; 17.90%	Mario Leclerc; 8,313; 17.48%	Wyatt Joseph Walsh; 1,038; 2.18%	Darcy Neal Donnelly (Libert.); 151; 0.32%	Guy Lauzon

== 2008 ==
Electoral district	Candidates					Incumbent
Electoral district	Conservative	Liberal	NDP	Green	Other	Incumbent
Glengarry— Prescott— Russell	Pierre Lemieux; 25,659; 47.30%	Dan Boudria; 19,997; 36.87%	Jean-Sébastien Caron; 5,678; 10.47%	Sylvie Lemieux; 2,908; 5.36%		Pierre Lemieux
Kingston and the Islands	Brian Abrams; 18,895; 32.54%	Peter Milliken; 22,734; 39.15%	Rick Downes; 10,158; 17.49%	Eric Walton; 6,282; 10.82%		Peter Milliken
Lanark— Frontenac— Lennox and Addington	Scott Reid; 30,272; 55.88%	David Remington; 11,809; 21.80%	Sandra Willard; 7,112; 13.13%	Chris Walker; 4,629; 8.55%	Ernest Oliver Rathwell (Mar.); 347; 0.64%	Scott Reid
Leeds—Grenville	Gord Brown; 27,473; 58.44%	Marjory Loveys; 8,075; 17.18%	Steve Armstrong; 6,511; 13.85%	Jeanie Warnock; 4,522; 9.62%	John McCrea (PC); 426; 0.91%	Gord Brown
Prince Edward—Hastings	Daryl Kramp; 26,061; 50.19%	Ken Cole; 14,048; 27.06%	Michael McMahon; 7,156; 13.78%	Alan Coxwell; 4,379; 8.43%	Paul Barnes (Ind.); 276; 0.53%	Daryl Kramp
Renfrew— Nipissing— Pembroke	Cheryl Gallant; 28,908; 61.10%	Carole Devine; 9,737; 20.58%	Sue McSheffrey; 5,175; 10.94%	Ben Hoffman; 3,201; 6.77%	Denis Gagné (Ind.); 293; 0.62%	Cheryl Gallant
Stormont— Dundas— South Glengarry	Guy Lauzon; 25,846; 57.34%	Denis Sabourin; 8,554; 18.98%	Darlene Jalbert; 6,107; 13.55%	David Rawnsley; 1,880; 4.17%	DWight Dugas (CAP); 105 0.23%	Guy Lauzon
Stormont— Dundas— South Glengarry	Guy Lauzon; 25,846; 57.34%	Denis Sabourin; 8,554; 18.98%	Darlene Jalbert; 6,107; 13.55%	David Rawnsley; 1,880; 4.17%	Howard Galganov (Ind.); 2,581 5.73%	Guy Lauzon

== 2006 ==
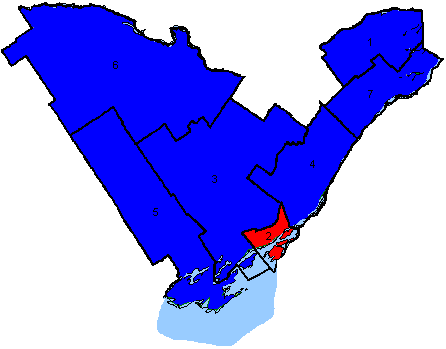
Map of the region's ridings. Colours show the result from the 2006 election

1. Glengarry-Prescott-Russell
2. Kingston and the Islands
3. Lanark-Frontenac-Lennox and Addington
4. Leeds-Grenville
5. Prince Edward-Hastings
6. Renfrew-Nipissing-Pembroke
7. Stormont-Dundas-South Glengarry

Electoral district	Candidates					Incumbent
Electoral district	Liberal	Conservative	NDP	Green	Other	Incumbent
Glengarry— Prescott—Russell	René Berthiaume; 22,787; 41.19%	Pierre Lemieux; 22,990; 41.56%	Jo-Ann Fennessey; 7,049; 12.74%	Bonnie Jean-Louis; 2,494; 4.51%		Don Boudria†
Kingston and the Islands	Peter Milliken; 28,548; 45.86%	Lou Grimshaw; 16,230; 26.07%	Rob Hutchison; 11,946; 19.19%	Eric Walton; 5,006; 8.04%	Don Rogers (CAP); 222 0.36%	Peter Milliken
Kingston and the Islands	Peter Milliken; 28,548; 45.86%	Lou Grimshaw; 16,230; 26.07%	Rob Hutchison; 11,946; 19.19%	Eric Walton; 5,006; 8.04%	Karl Eric Walker (Ind.); 296 0.48%	Peter Milliken
Lanark—Frontenac— Lennox and Addington	Geoff Turner; 14,709; 24.74%	Scott Reid; 30,367; 51.07%	Helen Forsey; 9,604; 16.15%	Mike Nickerson; 3,115; 5.24%	Jerry Ackerman (CAP); 429 0.72%	Scott Reid
Lanark—Frontenac— Lennox and Addington	Geoff Turner; 14,709; 24.74%	Scott Reid; 30,367; 51.07%	Helen Forsey; 9,604; 16.15%	Mike Nickerson; 3,115; 5.24%	Jeffrey Bogaerts (PC); 735 1.24%	Scott Reid
Lanark—Frontenac— Lennox and Addington	Geoff Turner; 14,709; 24.74%	Scott Reid; 30,367; 51.07%	Helen Forsey; 9,604; 16.15%	Mike Nickerson; 3,115; 5.24%	Ernest Rathwell (Mar.); 501 0.84%	Scott Reid
Leeds—Grenville	Bob Eaton; 12,661; 24.32%	Gord Brown; 28,447; 54.65%	Steve Armstrong; 7,945; 15.26%	David Lee; 3,003; 5.77%		Gord Brown
Prince Edward—Hastings	Bob Vaughan; 18.034; 31.58%	Daryl Kramp; 27,787; 48.67%	Michael McMahon; 8,474; 14.84%	Joseph Sahadat; 2,386; 4.18%	Tim Hickey (Ind.); 416; 0.73%	Daryl Kramp
Renfrew—Nipissing— Pembroke	Don Lindsay; 12,532; 24.16%	Cheryl Gallant; 29,923; 57.69%	Sue McSheffrey; 6,509; 12.55%	Gordon Scott McLeod; 1,605; 3.09%	Paul Kelly (Ind.); 1,304; 2.51%	Cheryl Gallant
Stormont—Dundas— South Glengarry	Tom Manley; 13,906; 27.17%	Guy Lauzon; 28,014; 54.73%	Elaine MacDonald; 6,892; 13.46%	Doug Beards; 1,713; 3.35%	Carson Chisholm (CHP); 663; 1.30%	Guy Lauzon

== 2004 ==
Electoral district	Candidates					Incumbent
Electoral district	Liberal	Conservative	NDP	Green	Other	Incumbent
Glengarry— Prescott—Russell	Don Boudria; 23,921; 47.86%	Alain Lalonde; 18,729; 37.47%	Martin Cauvier; 4,238; 8.48%	Roy Fjarlie; 2,634; 5.27%	Tim Bloedow (CHP); 464; 0.93%	Don Boudria
Kingston and the Islands	Peter Milliken; 28,544; 52.45%	Blair MacLean; 12,582; 23.12%	Rob Hutchison; 8,964; 16.47%	Janina Fisher Balfour; 3,339; 6.13%	Rosie The Clown Elston (Ind.); 237 0.44%	Peter Milliken
Kingston and the Islands	Peter Milliken; 28,544; 52.45%	Blair MacLean; 12,582; 23.12%	Rob Hutchison; 8,964; 16.47%	Janina Fisher Balfour; 3,339; 6.13%	Terry Marshall (CHP); 481 0.88%	Peter Milliken
Kingston and the Islands	Peter Milliken; 28,544; 52.45%	Blair MacLean; 12,582; 23.12%	Rob Hutchison; 8,964; 16.47%	Janina Fisher Balfour; 3,339; 6.13%	Don Rogers (CAP); 179 0.33%	Peter Milliken
Kingston and the Islands	Peter Milliken; 28,544; 52.45%	Blair MacLean; 12,582; 23.12%	Rob Hutchison; 8,964; 16.47%	Janina Fisher Balfour; 3,339; 6.13%	Karl Eric Walker (Ind.); 100 0.18%	Peter Milliken
Lanark—Frontenac— Lennox and Addington	Larry McCormick; 17,507; 30.97%	Scott Jeffrey Reid; 27,566; 48.77%	Ross Sutherland; 7,418; 13.12%	John Baranyi; 2,736; 4.84%	George Walter Kolaczynski (Mar.); 479 0.85% Bill Vankoughnet (Ind.); 820 1.45%	Larry McCormick
Lanark—Frontenac— Lennox and Addington	Larry McCormick; 17,507; 30.97%	Scott Jeffrey Reid; 27,566; 48.77%	Ross Sutherland; 7,418; 13.12%	John Baranyi; 2,736; 4.84%	George Walter Kolaczynski (Mar.); 479 0.85% Bill Vankoughnet (Ind.); 820 1.45%	merged district
Lanark—Frontenac— Lennox and Addington	Larry McCormick; 17,507; 30.97%	Scott Jeffrey Reid; 27,566; 48.77%	Ross Sutherland; 7,418; 13.12%	John Baranyi; 2,736; 4.84%	George Walter Kolaczynski (Mar.); 479 0.85% Bill Vankoughnet (Ind.); 820 1.45%	Scott Reid
Leeds—Grenville	Joe Jordan; 16,967; 32.93%	Gord Brown; 26,002; 50.46%	Steve Armstrong; 5,834; 11.32%	Chris Bradshaw; 2,722; 5.28%		Joe Jordan
Prince Edward—Hastings	Bruce Knutson; 20,042; 37.57%	Daryl Kramp; 22,598; 42.36%	Dan Douglas; 8,105; 15.19%	Tom Lawson; 2,130; 3.99%	Joseph Sahadat (Ind.); 468; 0.88%	Lyle Vanclief†
Renfrew—Nipissing— Pembroke	Rob Jamieson; 14,798; 29.65%	Cheryl Gallant; 27,494; 55.08%	Sue McSheffrey; 5,720; 11.46%	Gordon S McLeod; 1,191; 2.39%	Stanley Sambey (Mar.); 714; 1.43%	Cheryl Gallant
Stormont—Dundas— South Glengarry	Bob Kilger; 17,779; 36.78%	Guy Lauzon; 21,678; 44.85%	Elaine MacDonald; 5,387; 11.15%	Tom Manley; 3,491; 7.22%		Bob Kilger

=== Maps ===
1. Glengarry-Prescott-Russell
2. Kingston and the Islands
3. Lanark-Frontenac-Lennox and Addington
4. Leeds-Grenville
5. Prince Edward-Hastings
6. Renfrew-Nipissing-Pembroke
7. Stormont-Dundas-South Glengarry
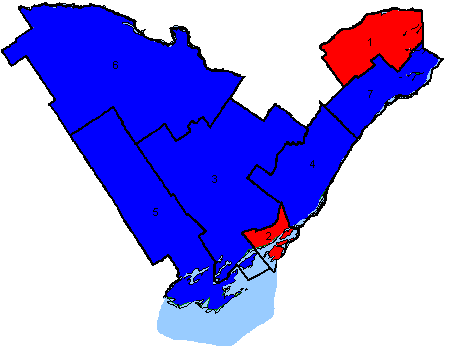
Map of the region's ridings in 2004. Colours show the result from the 2004 election

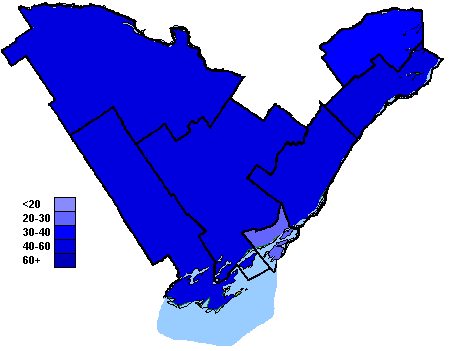
Conservative Party of Canada

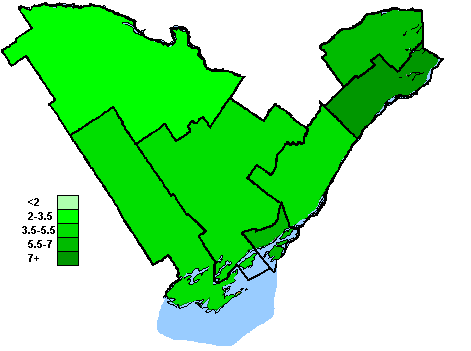
Green Party of Canada

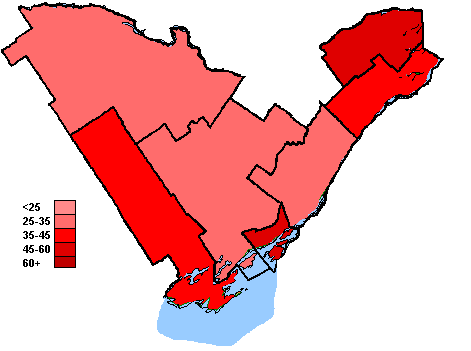
Liberal Party of Canada

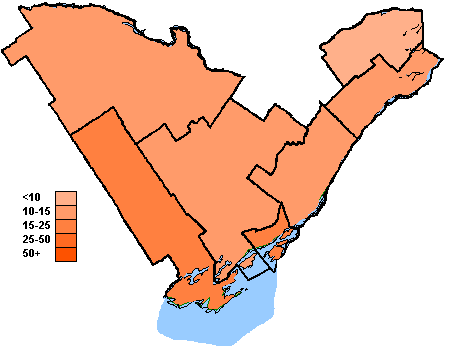
New Democratic Party

== 2000 ==
Electoral district	Candidates							Incumbent
Electoral district	Liberal	Canadian Alliance	NDP	PC	Canadian Action	No Affiliation	Other	Incumbent
Glengarry—Prescott—Russell	Don Boudria; 31,371; 67.96%	L. Sebastian Anders; 8,632; 18.70%	Guy Belle-Isle; 1,877; 4.07%	Ashley O'Kurley; 3,942; 8.54%			Wayne Foster (NLP); 340; 0.74%	Don Boudria
Hastings—Frontenac—Lennox and Addington	Larry McCormick; 16,996; 39.00%	Sean McAdam; 13,227; 30.35%	Tom O'Neill; 2,200; 5.05%	Daryl Kramp; 10,231; 23.48%	Paul Isaacs (CAP); 156; 0.36%	Ross Baker (Ind.); 207 0.48% Kenneth Switzer; 43 0.10%	Chris Walker (Green); 516; 1.18%	Larry McCormick
Kingston and the Islands	Peter Milliken; 26,457; 51.69%	Kevin Goligher; 7,904; 15.44%	Gary Wilson; 4,951; 9.67%	Blair MacLean; 9,222; 18.02%			Chris Milburn (Green); 2,652; 5.18%	Peter Milliken
Lanark—Carleton	Ian Murray; 22,811; 35.99%	Scott Reid; 24,670; 38.93%	Theresa Kiefer; 1,946; 3.07%	Bryan Brulotte; 12,430; 19.61%	Ross Elliott (CAP); 388; 0.61%	John Baranyi (Ind.); 150; 0.24%	Stuart Langstaff (Green); 871 1.37% Britt Roberts (NLP); 107 0.17%	Ian Murray
Leeds—Grenville	Joe Jordan; 18,594; 39.51%	Gord Brown; 18,539; 39.39%	Martin Hanratty; 990; 2.10%	John M. Johnston; 7,940; 16.87%	Jane Pamela Scharf (CAP); 181; 0.38%		Jerry Heath (Green); 816; 1.73%	Joe Jordan
Prince Edward—Hastings	Lyle Vanclief; 20,055; 50.46%	Jim Graham; 9,707; 24.43%	Jason Gannon; 1,897; 4.77%	Dennis Timbrell; 8,083; 20.34%				Lyle Vanclief
Renfrew—Nipissing—Pembroke	Hec Clouthier; 18,211; 39.00%	Cheryl Gallant; 20,634; 44.18%	Ole Hendrickson; 1,607; 3.44%	Bob Amaron; 5,287; 11.32%		Thane C. Heins; 121; 0.26%	André Giordano (NLP); 78 0.17% Stanley E. Sambey (Mar.); 762 1.63%	Hec Clouthier
Stormont—Dundas— Charlottenburgh	Bob Kilger; 19,113; 46.69%	Guy Lauzon; 16,151; 39.45%	Kimberley Fry; 1,696; 4.14%	Michael Bailey; 3,635; 8.88%	Georges Elie Novy (CAP); 127; 0.31%		Ian Campbell (NLP); 214; 0.52%	Bob Kilger

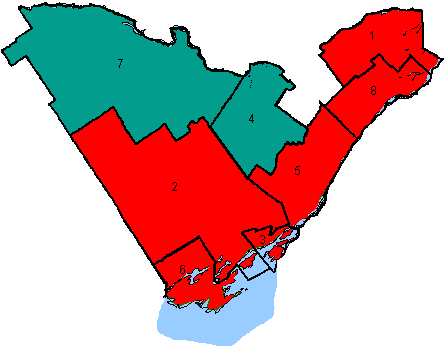
Map of the region's ridings in 2000. Colors show the result from the 2000 election.

1. Glengarry-Prescott-Russell
2. Hastings-Frontenac-Lennox and Addington
3. Kingston and the Islands
4. Lanark-Carleton
5. Leeds-Grenville
6. Prince Edward-Hastings
7. Renfrew-Nipissing-Pembroke
8. Stormont-Dundas-Charlottenburg

== 1997 ==
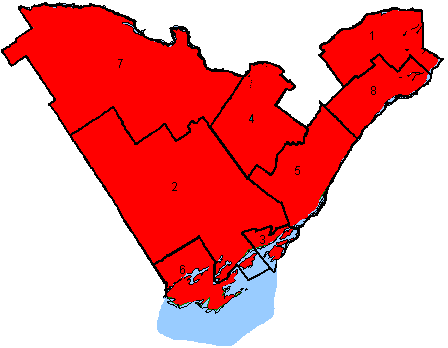
Map of the region's ridings in 1997. Colours show the result from the 1997 election

1. Glengarry-Prescott-Russell
2. Hastings-Frontenac-Lennox and Addington
3. Kingston and the Islands
4. Lanark-Carleton
5. Leeds-Grenville
6. Prince Edward-Hastings
7. Renfrew-Nipissing-Pembroke
8. Stormont-Dundas

Electoral district	Candidates						Incumbent
Electoral district	Liberal	Reform	NDP	PC	Green	Other	Incumbent
Glengarry—Prescott—Russell	Don Boudria; 34,986	Mike Lancop; 4,599	Fred Cappuccino; 2,289	France Somers; 6,109	Richard Kerr; 417	Mary L. Glasser (NLP); 207	Don Boudria
Hastings—Frontenac—Lennox and Addington	Larry McCormick; 18,399	Sean McAdam; 12,045	Robert Snefjella; 3,255	Daryl Kramp; 12,227		Others Kenneth Switzer (CHP); 505; Lester Newby (NLP); 189	Larry McCormick
Kingston and the Islands	Peter Milliken; 25,632	Dave Clarke; 6,761	Gary Wilson; 6,433	Helen Cooper; 11,296	Chris Walker; 902	Terry Marshall (CHP); 751	Peter Milliken
Lanark—Carleton	Ian Murray; 28,151	Darrel Robert Reid; 16,765	Gail Myles; 3,022	Bryce Grayson Bell; 13,213	Susan Brandum; 463	Others Gerald W. LePage (CAP); 318; Britt Roberts (NLP); 181	Ian Murray
Leeds—Grenville	Joe Jordan; 19,123	Doug Aldridge; 10,476	Jennifer Breakspear; 1,757	Sandra Lawn; 15,636	Peter Bevan-Baker; 1,102	Others Donny F. Platt (CHP); 241; Wayne Foster (NLP); 119	Jim Jordan †
Prince Edward—Hastings	Lyle Vanclief; 22,415	Lloyd Lewis; 9,219	Barb Dolan; 2,512	Dennis Timbrell; 9,305			Lyle Vanclief
Renfrew—Nipissing—Pembroke	Hec Clouthier; 19,569	Ed Pinnell; 13,035	Barbara Clarke; 3,242	Bob Gould; 12,352		Others Gay Curran-Desmond (CAP); 236; André Giordano (NLP); 183	Len Hopkins †
Stormont—Dundas	Bob Kilger; 22,857	Charles Dillabough; 8,945	Sydney Gardiner; 2,671	Leslie O'Shaughnessy; 8,741		Ian Campbell (NLP); 295	Bob Kilger

== 1993 ==
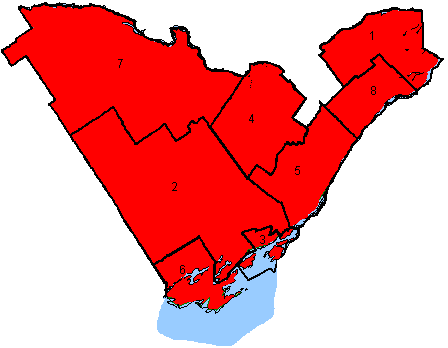
Map of the region's ridings in 1993. Colours show the result from the 1993 election

1. Glengarry-Prescott-Russell
2. Hastings-Frontenac-Lennox and Addington
3. Kingston and the Islands
4. Lanark-Carleton
5. Leeds-Grenville
6. Prince Edward-Hastings
7. Renfrew-Nipissing-Pembroke
8. Stormont-Dundas

Electoral district	Candidates							Incumbent
Electoral district	PC	Liberal	NDP	Reform	Green	National	Other	Incumbent
Glengarry—Prescott—Russell	France Somers; 4,572	Don Boudria; 44,775	Pascal Villeneuve; 1,304	Sam McCracken; 4,456			Others Pierrette Blondin (NLP); 473; Jean-Serge Brisson (Lbt.); 244	Don Boudria
Hastings—Frontenac—Lennox and Addington	Bill Vankoughnet; 10,963	Larry McCormick; 24,085	Bett Hay Lambeck; 2,012	Stephen Ollerenshaw; 8,851		Bob Hilson; 997	Others T. Cheemo The Clown Walczak (Ind.); 752; Ross Baker (Ind.); 413	Bill Vankoughnet
Kingston and the Islands	Barry Gordon; 10,088	Peter Milliken; 30,336	Mary Ann Higgins; 3,700	Sean McAdam; 6,740		Chris Papadopoulos; 1,643	Others Terry M. Marshall (CHP); 645; Chris Wilson (NLP); 339	Peter Milliken
Lanark—Carleton	Paul Dick; 16,604	Ian Murray; 35,051	Judie McSkimmings; 1,689	Ron Macdonald; 15,766	Stephen Johns; 329	Jacques Rubacha; 926	Others Britt Roberts (NLP); 264; Barbara Rowe (Lbt.); 99; Bracken Begley (Abol.); 62	Paul Dick
Leeds—Grenville	Sandra Lawn; 13,595	Jim Jordan; 26,324	Mary Ann Greenwood; 999	Paul West; 7,975	Peter Bevan-Baker; 527	Holly Baker; 481	Others Richard Beecroft (NLP); 196; Christine M. Richardson (Abol.); 56	Jim Jordan
Prince Edward—Hastings	Jim Hughes; 8,245	Lyle Vanclief; 26,483	Jim Martin; 1,275	Marjorie Foster; 9,019		Christine Kosman; 639	Others Dave Switzer (CHP); 556; Siggi Lamothe (NLP); 171	Lyle Vanclief
Renfrew—Nipissing—Pembroke	Milton Stevenson; 7,039	Len Hopkins; 25,725	Barbara Clarke; 1,345	Edward Pinnell; 6,209			Others Hec Clouthier (Ind.); 10,287; Murray Reid (Abol.); 145; Daphne Quance (NLP); 143	Len Hopkins
Stormont—Dundas	Leslie Ault; 7,499	Bob Kilger; 27,055	David Moss; 1,147	Annette Turner; 5,858		Andy Boyle; 580	Others Ian Campbell (NLP); 425; Reginald Landry (PCC); 79	Bob Kilger

== 1988 ==
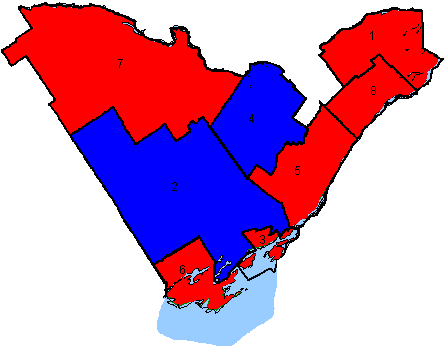
Map of the region's ridings in 1988. Colours show the result from the 1988 election

1. Glengarry-Prescott-Russell
2. Hastings-Frontenac-Lennox and Addington
3. Kingston and the Islands
4. Lanark-Carleton
5. Leeds-Grenville
6. Prince Edward-Hastings
7. Renfrew
8. Stormont-Dundas

Electoral district	Candidates				Incumbent
Electoral district	PC	Liberal	NDP	Other	Incumbent
Glengarry— Prescott—Russell	Roger R. Presseault; 9,517	Don Boudria; 35,280	Helena McCuaig; 4,537	Jean-Serge Brisson (Lbt.); 335; John Feres (PCC)	Don Boudria
Hastings—Frontenac— Lennox and Addington	Bill Vankoughnet; 17,247	Earl Smith; 16,379	Bud Acton; 7,455	Richard Welsman (CHP); 1,598; Ross Baker (Ind.); 478	Bill Vankoughnet
Kingston and the Islands	Flora MacDonald; 20,409	Peter Milliken; 23,121	Len Johnson; 11,442	Terry Marshall (CHP); 1,646; John Hayes (Lbt.); 301	Flora MacDonald
Lanark—Carleton	Paul Dick; 27,379	Janet Marshall; 20,275	Bill Cox; 8,359	Robert Stratton (CRWP); 981	Paul Dick
Leeds—Grenville	Jennifer Cossitt; 18,053	Jim Jordan; 20,141	Barry Grills; 5,141	David J. Butcher (CHP); 1,584; Faye Garner (CRWP); 1,497	Jennifer Cossitt
Prince Edward—Hastings	Jack Arthur; 16,408	Lyle Vanclief; 19,559	Don Wilson; 6,564	John B. Herring (CHP); 2,063; Doug Grant (CRWP); 522; Heather-Anne Lapsley (Lbt.); 229	Jack Ellis †
Renfrew	Ben Hoffman; 15,081	Len Hopkins; 25,558	Elizabeth Ives-Ruyter; 5,879	Murray Reid (CRWP); 520	Len Hopkins
Stormont—Dundas	Eric J. Cameron; 12,572	Bob Kilger; 19,698	Steve J. Corrie; 5,448	Bob Noble (CRWP); 5,135	Norm Warner †

== 1984 ==
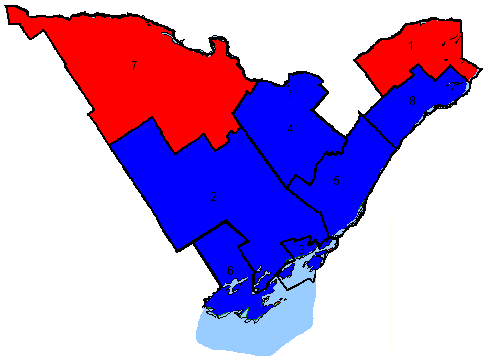
Map of the region's ridings in 1984. Colours show the result from the 1984 election

1. Glengarry-Prescott-Russell
2. Hastings-Frontenac-Lennox and Addington
3. Kingston and the Islands
4. Lanark-Renfrew-Carleton
5. Leeds-Grenville
6. Prince Edward-Hastings
7. Renfrew-Nipissing-Pembroke
8. Stormont-Dundas

Electoral district	Candidates				Incumbent
Electoral district	Liberal	PC	NDP	Other	Incumbent
Glengarry— Prescott—Russell	Don Boudria; 26,057	John Stante; 16,170	Annemarie Collard; 6,838		Denis Éthier †
Hastings—Frontenac— Lennox and Addington	Ron Vastokas; 9,757	Bill Vankoughnet; 19,996	Donna Forth; 5,349	Ross Baker (Ind.); 441	Bill Vankoughnet
Kingston and the Islands	George N. Speal; 13,087	Flora MacDonald; 25,997	Andrew Currie; 5,950	Daniel Eardley (N/A); 1,410; E.J. Ted Bond (Green); 478; Ian Murray (Lbt.); 258	Flora MacDonald
Lanark—Renfrew—Carleton	Brooke McNabb; 15,528	Paul Dick; 24,395	Don Page; 5,310	Floyd J. Craig (PCC); 139	Paul Dick
Leeds—Grenville	Chuck Anderson; 10,222	Jennifer Cossitt; 26,961	Jan Allen; 6,121	Mike Nickerson (Green); 348; Hans Wienhold (Lbt.); 190	Jennifer Cossitt
Prince Edward—Hastings	Robert Scott; 10,321	Jack Ellis; 21,034	Don Wilson; 7,162	George Nip Casey (Ind.); 197	Jack Ellis
Renfrew—Nipissing—Pembroke	Len Hopkins; 19,502	Don Whillans; 19,464	Gavin Murphy; 4,253		Len Hopkins
Stormont—Dundas	Ed Lumley; 18,821	Norm Warner; 21,043	Raymond Lefebvre; 5,869		Ed Lumley

== 1980 ==
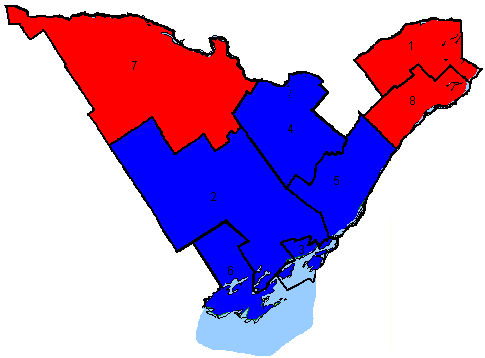
Map of the region's ridings in 1980. Colours show the result from the 1980 election

1. Glengarry-Prescott-Russell
2. Hastings-Frontenac
3. Kingston and the Islands
4. Lanark-Renfrew-Carleton
5. Leeds-Grenville
6. Prince Edward-Hastings
7. Renfrew-Nipissing-Pembroke
8. Stormont-Dundas

Electoral district	Candidates				Incumbent
Electoral district	PC	Liberal	NDP	Other	Incumbent
Glengarry— Prescott—Russell	Gordon Johnson; 8,113	Denis Éthier; 28,189	Claude Dion; 4,781	Gary O'Brien (M-L); 90	Denis Éthier
Hastings—Frontenac	Bill Vankoughnet; 14,211	Ron Vastokas; 13,132	Kevin Arsenault; 5,895	Ross Baker (Ind.); 342	Bill Vankoughnet
Kingston and the Islands	Flora MacDonald; 18,146	John Coleman; 17,039	Stephen Foster; 7,830	Edward T. Sharp (Rhino.); 373	Flora MacDonald
Lanark—Renfrew—Carleton	Paul Dick; 20,487	Pat Carroll; 11,817	Gord Gilhuly; 4,948	Stuart Neilson (N/A); 247	Paul Dick
Leeds—Grenville	Tom Cossitt; 19,800	Gerry McKee; 12,260	Mildred Smith; 6,600		Tom Cossitt
Prince Edward—Hastings	Jack Ellis; 16,893	Ben Prinzen; 12,821	Don Wilson; 6,889	Bill Hawthorne (Ind.); 211	Jack Ellis
Renfrew—Nipissing—Pembroke	Bob Amaron; 12,966	Leonard Hopkins; 20,529	Don Breault; 6,200		Leonard Hopkins
Stormont—Dundas	James C. Bredin; 15,089	Ed Lumley; 22,251	Maurice Labelle; 4,629		Ed Lumley

== 1979 ==
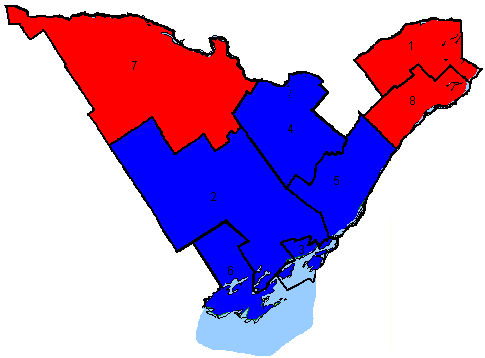
Map of the region's ridings in 1979. Colours show the result from the 1979 election

1. Glengarry-Prescott-Russell
2. Hastings-Frontenac
3. Kingston and the Islands
4. Lanark-Renfrew-Carleton
5. Leeds-Grenville
6. Prince Edward-Hastings
7. Renfrew-Nipissing-Pembroke
8. Stormont-Dundas

Electoral district	Candidates				Incumbent
Electoral district	Liberal	PC	NDP	Other	Incumbent
Glengarry—Prescott—Russell	Denis Éthier; 27,106	Gordon Johnson; 10,112	Paul de Broeck; 4,164	Gary O'Brien (M-L); 107	Denis Éthier
Hastings—Frontenac	Ron Vastokas; 11,176	Bill Vankoughnet; 17,537	Kevin Arsenault; 5,691	Ross Baker (Ind.); 417	Douglas Alkenbrack †; Frontenac—Lennox and Addington
Kingston and the Islands	Peter Beeman; 14,866	Flora MacDonald; 21,277	Stephen Foster; 8,472		Flora MacDonald
Lanark—Renfrew—Carleton	Pat Carroll; 10,485	Paul Dick; 24,277	Gord Gilhuly; 5,749		Paul Dick
Leeds—Grenville	Gerry McKee; 11,797	Tom Cossitt; 24,127	Mildred Smith; 6,551		Tom Cossitt; Leeds
Prince Edward—Hastings	Kay Manderville; 12,394	Jack Ellis; 21,088	Don Wilson; 5,833	William R. Hawthorne (Ind.); 261	Jack Ellis; Hastings
Renfrew—Nipissing—Pembroke	Leonard D. Hopkins; 20,286	Don Sutherland; 13,781	Don Breault; 7,133		Leonard D. Hopkins
Stormont—Dundas	Ed Lumley; 20,581	Dick Aubry; 17,575	Brian Peters; 5,568		Ed Lumley

== 1974 ==
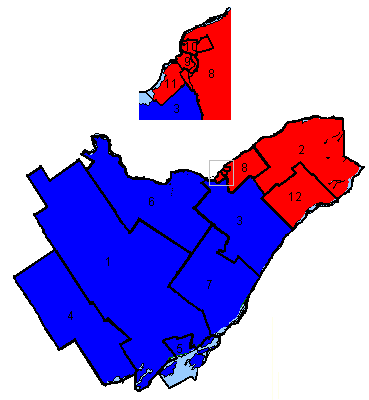
Map of the region's ridings in 1974. Colours show the result from the 1974 election

1. Frontenac-Lennox and Addington
2. Glengarry-Prescott-Russell
3. Grenville-Carleton
4. Hastings
5. Kingston and the Islands
6. Lanark-Renfrew-Carleton
7. Leeds
8. Ottawa-Carleton
9. Ottawa Centre
10. Ottawa-Vanier
11. Ottawa West
12. Stormont-Dundas

Electoral district	Candidates				Incumbent
Electoral district	Liberal	PC	NDP	Other	Incumbent
Frontenac—Lennox and Addington	Grace Stalker; 10,961	Douglas Alkenbrack; 14,102	William Bud Acton; 4,157		Douglas Alkenbrack
Glengarry—Prescott—Russell	Denis Éthier; 18,478	Bernard Pelot; 6,595	Raymond Desrochers; 5,484		Denis Éthier
Grenville—Carleton	Jim McDonald; 22,803	Walter Baker; 33,946	Joan Kabayama; 5,679		Walter Baker
Hastings	Marie Kurchak; 12,474	Jack Ellis; 14,893	Bob Sanders; 3,382	Floyd Hawley (S.C.); 194	Jack Ellis
Kingston and the Islands	Peter Watson; 13,943	Flora MacDonald; 17,839	Lars Thompson; 6,870		Flora MacDonald
Lanark—Renfrew—Carleton	Bud Barrett; 13,009	Paul Dick; 18,242	Stuart Morrison; 3,428		Paul Dick
Leeds	Donna M. Healey; 10,845	Tom Cossitt; 17,744	Keith Sutcliffe; 4,659		Tom Cossitt
Ottawa—Carleton	John N. Turner; 38,463	Bill Neville; 27,588	Dave Hall; 6,014		John N. Turner
Ottawa Centre	Hugh Poulin; 15,308	Hugh Segal; 12,138	Irving Greenberg; 6,739	Other candidates Bela Egyed (Waffle); 877; John Graham (S.C.); 139; Ray Quann (Libertarian); 63; Phil Sarazen (M-L); 62	Hugh Poulin
Ottawa—Vanier	Jean-Robert Gauthier; 21,773	Claude L. Choquette; 5,603	Paul H. Michaud; 3,298	Other candidates Cyril E. Gauthier (S.C.); 976; Judith T. Haddad (Ind.); 114; Edmond Irani (Ind.); 107	Jean-Robert Gauthier
Ottawa West	Lloyd Francis; 23,604	Peter Reilly; 21,838	Doris Shackleton; 6,480	Other candidates Lawrence F. Sullivan (Canada); 432; Jacques Lapointe (S.C.); 192; Jean Greatbatch (Comm.); 78; Richard Bowen (M-L); 67	Peter Reilly
Stormont—Dundas	Ed Lumley; 18,047	Fern Guindon; 13,895	James Freeman; 2,587		Lucien Lamoureux †

== 1972 ==
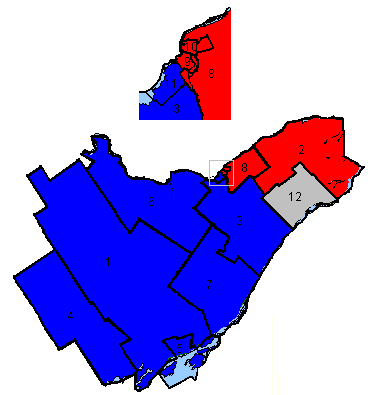
Map of the region's ridings in 1972. Colours show the result from the 1972 election

1. Frontenac-Lennox and Addington
2. Glengarry-Prescott-Russell
3. Grenville-Carleton
4. Hastings
5. Kingston and the Islands
6. Lanark-Renfrew-Carleton
7. Leeds
8. Ottawa-Carleton
9. Ottawa Centre
10. Ottawa East
11. Ottawa West
12. Stormont-Dundas

Electoral district	Candidates				Incumbent
Electoral district	Liberal	PC	NDP	Other	Incumbent
Frontenac—Lennox and Addington	Peter MacKinnon; 9,206	Douglas Alkenbrack; 16,563	Mary Lloyd-Jones; 3,283		Douglas Alkenbrack
Glengarry— Prescott—Russell	Denis Éthier; 14,780	J.-L. Montreuil; 6,924	Jacques Boyer; 2,495	Bernard Pelot (Ind.); 2,478; W.-R. Marin (S.C.) 1,710	Viateur Éthier †
Grenville—Carleton	Gordon Blair; 22,026	Walter Baker; 32,689	Joan Kabayama; 6,405		Gordon Blair
Hastings	Frank Follwell; 11,391	Jack Ellis; 16,591	Elridge G. Brethour; 3,378		Lee Grills †
Kingston and the Islands	John Hazlett; 14,079	Flora MacDonald; 22,824	Lars Thompson; 5,807		Edgar Benson †
Lanark—Renfrew—Carleton	Murray McBride; 13,283	Paul Dick; 17,893	Henry Mellema; 1,819		Murray McBride
Leeds	Gervis Black; 10,650	Tom Cossitt; 18,130	Keith Sutcliffe; 4,850		Desmond Code †
Ottawa—Carleton	John N. Turner; 31,316	Strome Galloway; 22,641	Doris Shackleton; 11,225	David Morse (S.C.); 839	John N. Turner
Ottawa Centre	Hugh Poulin; 14,101	Hugh Segal; 12,899	Irving Greenberg; 9,195	Rocco Zavarella (S.C.); 237; Paul Herman (N/A); 177	George McIlraith †
Ottawa East	Jean-Robert Gauthier; 20,446	Gerry Valiquette; 6,029	François Beaulne; 4,672	Cyril Gauthier (S.C.); 1,229; David S. White (Ind.); 208	J.-T. Richard †
Ottawa West	Lloyd Francis; 18,423	Peter Reilly; 22,169	Pauline Jewett; 13,498	Priscilla Hamelin (S.C.); 245	Lloyd Francis
Stormont—Dundas		Grant Campbell; 12,364	Murray Forsyth; 3,108	Lucien Lamoureux (N/A); 17,347 René Benoit; 138	Lucien Lamoureux

== 1968 ==
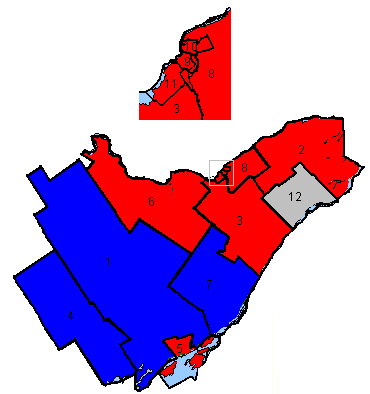
Map of the region's ridings in 1968. Colours show the result from the 1968 election

1. Frontenac-Lennox and Addington
2. Glengarry-Prescott
3. Grenville-Carleton
4. Hastings
5. Kingston and the Islands
6. Lanark and Renfrew
7. Leeds
8. Ottawa-Carleton
9. Ottawa Centre
10. Ottawa East
11. Ottawa West
12. Stormont-Dundas

Electoral district	Candidates				Incumbent
Electoral district	Liberal	PC	NDP	Other	Incumbent
Frontenac—Lennox and Addington	Peter C. Connolly; 9,953	Douglas Alkenbrack; 11,801	John Moss; 2,730	Clarence A. Mulligan (Ind. P.C.); 571	Douglas Alkenbrack; Prince Edward—Lennox
Glengarry—Prescott	Viateur Éthier; 14,970	J.-Lomer Carriere; 7,564	Claude Demers; 1,606		Viateur Éthier
Grenville—Carleton	Gordon Blair; 21,250	Jean Wadds; 18,843	David Bell; 3,887		Dick Bell †; Carleton
Grenville—Carleton	Gordon Blair; 21,250	Jean Wadds; 18,843	David Bell; 3,887		merged district
Grenville—Carleton	Gordon Blair; 21,250	Jean Wadds; 18,843	David Bell; 3,887		Jean Wadds; Grenville—Dundas
Hastings	Robert Temple; 10,875	Lee Grills; 13,555	Donald G. Burshaw; 3,195		Lee Grills; Hastings South
Kingston and the Islands	Edgar Benson; 16,234	Bogart W. Trumpour; 11,799	Brendan McConnell; 4,636		Edgar Benson; Kingston
Lanark and Renfrew	Murray McBride; 13,156	James W. Baskin; 12,737	James Ronson; 1,861		Joe Greene (Note: Ran for re-election in Niagara Falls.); Renfrew South
Leeds	Ross Matheson; 13,532	Desmond Code; 13,536	Clayton C. Graves; 2,005		Ross Matheson
Ottawa—Carleton	John N. Turner; 28,987	Ken Binks; 11,665	Harold Wilson; 3,115		Paul Tardif †; Russell
Ottawa Centre	George McIlraith; 19,578	Murray A. Heit; 11,602	June B. Ralph; 2,729		new district
Ottawa East	J.-T. Richard; 26,170	Rex Le Lacheur; 4,168	Ian Macdonald; 2,921		J.-T. Richard
Ottawa West	Lloyd Francis; 23,750	Dick Bell; 16,392	Ralph Sutherland; 5,003		George McIlraith (Note: Ran for re-election in Ottawa Centre.)
Stormont—Dundas			Tim Wees; 5,409	Lucien Lamoureux; 17,014	Lucien Lamoureux; Stormont

== 1965 ==
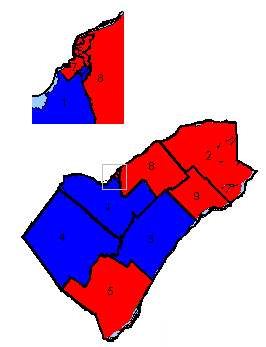
Map of the region's ridings in 1965. Colours show the result from the 1965 election

1. Carleton
2. Glengarry-Prescott
3. Grenville-Dundas
4. Lanark
5. Leeds
6. Ottawa East
7. Ottawa West
8. Russell
9. Stormont

Electoral district	Candidates				Incumbent
Electoral district	Liberal	PC	NDP	Other	Incumbent
Carleton	Lloyd Francis; 31,523	Dick Bell; 32,456	Donald Stirling; 9,953		Lloyd Francis
Glengarry—Prescott	Viateur Éthier; 10,339	Albert-R. Cadieux; 6,529	Wilfrid Latreille; 1,173	Raymond Berthiaume (Ral. Créd.); 1,204	Viateur Éthier
Grenville—Dundas	John Palmer; 6,930	Jean Casselman Wadds; 9,845	René Benoit; 595		Jean Wadds
Lanark	John Steele Kirkland; 6,826	Desmond Code; 9,784	Stanley Livingstone; 775	William Hunter (S.C.); 335	George Doucett†
Leeds	Ross Matheson; 10,365	John MacLean; 10,066	William F. Thompson; 946		Ross Matheson
Ottawa East	Jean-Thomas Richard; 15,107	Rex Le Lacheur; 4,101	Ben Coffey; 2,564		J.-T. Richard
Ottawa West	George McIlraith; 14,945	Courtenay Evans; 8,604	David John Weston; 2,057	Angelo Tomasini (S.C.); 504	George McIlraith
Russell	Paul Tardif; 28,997	Ken Binks; 15,718	Harold Wilson; 7,186		Paul Tardif
Stormont	Lucien Lamoureux; 13,530	Ken Bergeron; 7,458	John Trew; 3,201		Lucien Lamoureux

== 1963 ==
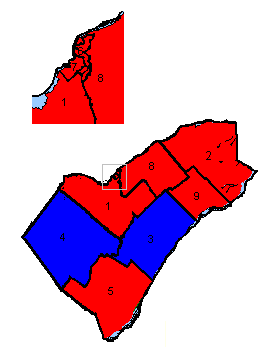
Map of the region's ridings in 1963. Colours show the result from the 1963 election

1. Carleton
2. Glengarry-Prescott
3. Grenville-Dundas
4. Lanark
5. Leeds
6. Ottawa East
7. Ottawa West
8. Russell
9. Stormont

Electoral district	Candidates					Incumbent
Electoral district	PC	Liberal	Social Credit	NDP	Other	Incumbent
Carleton	Dick Bell; 31,168	Lloyd Francis; 32,325	Harold Herbert Splett; 699	Lewis Hanley; 3,144		Dick Bell
Glengarry—Prescott	J.-Marcel Gelineau; 5,568	Viateur Éthier; 9,906	Rolland Cholette; 2,786	Peter Marcel Schneider; 394	Raymond Bruneau (I Lib.); 1,234	Viateur Éthier
Grenville—Dundas	Jean Casselman; 10,434	John Palmer; 7,207		Reginald S. Libby; 7,207		Jean Casselman
Lanark	George Doucett; 10,475	R. Arthur Stewart; 7,043	Oscar Wilmot Ventress; 312	James O. W. Griffith; 601		George Doucett
Leeds	Frances D. MacOdrum; 9,899	Ross Matheson; 12,113				Ross Matheson
Ottawa East	Rex Le Lacheur; 3,964	J.-T. Richard; 12,043	Roger Boulanger; 930	Ruth Townsend; 1,433	Yves Parisien (I Lib.); 6,574; Laurent Bordeleau (I P.C.); 349	J.-T. Richard
Ottawa West	Don Hueston; 9,852	George McIlraith; 18,634	F. D. Richardson; 924	Brian E. Huggins; 1,422		George McIlraith
Russell	Joe Poirier; 14,892	Paul Tardif; 31,182	Léo Cote; 2,938	Harold B. Wilson; 3,191		Paul Tardif
Stormont	John Alguire; 9,728	Lucien Lamoureux; 13,285	Ludger Boileau; 851	Bill Kilger; 801		Lucien Lamoureux

== 1962 ==
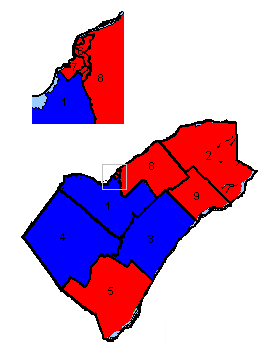
Map of the region's ridings in 1962. Colours show the result from the 1962 election
1. Carleton
2. Glengarry-Prescott
3. Grenville-Dundas
4. Lanark
5. Leeds
6. Ottawa East
7. Ottawa West
8. Russell
9. Stormont

Electoral district	Candidates				Incumbent
Electoral district	PC	Liberal	NDP	Social Credit	Incumbent
Carleton	Dick Bell; 32,125	Lloyd Francis; 26,109	Lewis Hanley; 3,024	Harold Herbert Splett; 922	Dick Bell
Glengarry—Prescott	Osie Villeneuve; 8,186	Viateur Éthier; 11,043	René Benoit; 461	Rolland Cholette; 639	Osie Villeneuve
Grenville—Dundas	Jean Casselman; 10,159	Robert Watters; 6,410	Reginald S. Libby; 299	Grace Catherine Gough; 258	Jean Casselman
Lanark	George Doucett; 10,462	Vincent Kelly; 6,823	Charles Ogilvie; 410	R. H. James; 660	George Doucett
Leeds	Jack Langmuir; 10,325	Ross Matheson; 12,071		Bill Hunter; 424	Ross Matheson
Ottawa East	Jean-Pierre Beaulne; 6,801	J.-T. Richard; 15,930	Marc Llanos; 1,216	Wilfrid H. Wigney; 534	J.-T. Richard
Ottawa West	Pat Kelly; 11,397	George McIlraith; 16,935	Walter Mann; 1,538	F. D. Richardson; 698	George McIlraith
Russell	Leo Kelly; 15,492	Paul Tardif; 29,322	Harold B. Wilson; 3,385	Adrien Papineau; 1,427	Paul Tardif
Stormont (Note: Election held on July 16 due to the death of the Liberal candidate.)	Grant Campbell; 11,293	Lucien Lamoureux; 11,363	Marjorie Ball; 946	Mel Rowat; 1,256	Grant Campbell

== 1958 ==
Electoral district	Candidates				Incumbent
Electoral district	PC	Liberal	CCF	Social Credit	Incumbent
Carleton	Dick Bell; 32,741	George Humble; 13,652	Stewart Crawford; 1,777	Grace Gough; 355	Dick Bell
Glengarry—Prescott	Osie Villeneuve; 10,385	Raymond Bruneau; 9,865			Osie Villeneuve
Grenville—Dundas	Arza Casselman; 10,793	Arthur Clark Casselman; 4,340		R. H. James; 473	Azra Casselman
Lanark	George Doucett; 12,116	William Y. Wood; 4,315			George Doucett
Leeds	Hayden Stanton; 12,675	George Taylor Fulford; 9,145			Hayden Stanton
Ottawa East	R.-D. Chenier; 9,850	J.-T. Richard; 17,161	William A. Layman; 573	Raymond Berthiaume; 357	J.-T. Richard
Ottawa West	Charlotte Whitton; 17,673	George McIlraith; 19,098	James A. M. Allen; 751		George McIlraith
Russell	Wib Nixon; 19,464	Joseph-Omer Gour; 21,575	Harry Jacks; 1,224	Eddie Parisien; 594	Joseph-Omer Gour
Stormont	Grant Campbell; 13,964	Albert Peter Lavigne; 11,977		Mel Rowat; 331	Albert Peter Lavigne

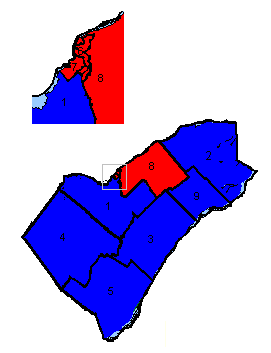
Map of the region's ridings in 1958. Colours show the result from the 1958 election
1. Carleton
2. Glengarry-Prescott
3. Grenville-Dundas
4. Lanark
5. Leeds
6. Ottawa East
7. Ottawa West
8. Russell
9. Stormont

== 1957 ==
Electoral district	Candidates					Incumbent
Electoral district	Liberal	PC	CCF	Social Credit	Other	Incumbent
Carleton	Frank Egan Dunlap; 15,298	Dick Bell; 27,865	Stewart Crawford; 1,334	Eric Kingsley Fallis; 607		Vacant
Glengarry—Prescott	Raymond Bruneau; 6,661	Osie Villeneuve; 8,241		Patrice Brunet; 198	René Bertrand (I. Lib); 5,414	Raymond Bruneau
Grenville—Dundas	Arthur Clark Casselman; 4,402	Arza Clair Casselman; 8,967		R. H. James; 1,072		Azra Clair Casselman
Lanark	W. Peter Burchell; 4,504	William Gourlay Blair; 11,629				William Gourlay Blair
Leeds	George Taylor Fulford; 10,125	Hayden Stanton; 11,065		Charles William Shaw; 395		Hayden Stanton
Ottawa East	Jean-Thomas Richard; 18,216	Eleanor Blackburn; 5,947	William A. Layman; 620	Raymond Berthiaume; 843		Jean-Thomas Richard
Ottawa West	George McIlraith; 19,434	Ethel T. Shaw; 12,538	David Williams; 1,062	Laurence M. Maloney; 881		George McIlraith
Russell	Joseph-Omer Gour; 20,673	Wib Nixon; 12,271	Harry Jacks; 1,420	Eddie Parisien; 1,161		Joseph-Omer Gour
Stormont	Albert Lavigne; 12,505	Grant Campbell; 10,215		Mel Rowat; 646		Albert Lavigne

== 1953 ==
Electoral district	Candidates				Incumbent
Electoral district	Liberal	PC	CCF	Other	Incumbent
Carleton	John H. Mcdonald; 14,676	George A. Drew; 20,137	Stewart Crawford; 1,334	Eric Kingsley Fallis (SC); 562	George A. Drew
Glengarry—Prescott	Raymond Bruneau; 7,800	Fernand Guindon; 5,893	François Boss; 280	William Major (I. Lib); 5,321	William Major; Glengarry
Glengarry—Prescott	Raymond Bruneau; 7,800	Fernand Guindon; 5,893	François Boss; 280	William Major (I. Lib); 5,321	merged district
Glengarry—Prescott	Raymond Bruneau; 7,800	Fernand Guindon; 5,893	François Boss; 280	William Major (I. Lib); 5,321	Raymond Bruneau (I. Lib); Prescott
Grenville—Dundas	Arthur Clark Casselman; 4,933	Arza Clair Casselman; 8,875			Azra Clair Casselman
Lanark	H. Brunett Montgomery; 5,316	William Gourlay Blair; 10,029	William Henry Powell; 451		William Gourlay Blair
Leeds	George Fulford; 9,736	Hayden Stanton; 10,097			George Fulford
Ottawa East	Jean-Thomas Richard; 19,863	Arthur Beauchesne; 5,511	W. Victor O'Brien; 1,209		Jean-Thomas Richard
Ottawa West	George McIlraith; 20,933	O. F. Howe; 13,539	John E. Macnab; 1,209	Daniel Nerenberg (LPP); 219	George McIlraith
Russell	Joseph-Omer Gour; 15,969	Joseph E. Charron; 6,470	Ernest Cousineau; 1,157	Alexandre Denommée (SC); 519	Joseph-Omer Gour
Stormont	Lionel Chevrier; 13,503	John Lawrence Mcdonald; 7,244			Lionel Chevrier

== 1949 ==
Electoral district	Candidates				Incumbent
Electoral district	Liberal	PC	CCF	Other	Incumbent
Carleton	John H. McDonald; 13,937	George A. Drew; 18,141	Eugene Forsey; 2,155		George A. Drew
Glengarry	William Major; 4,809	John D. MacLeod; 3,559		John J. Fitzgerald (SC); 300	William Lyon Mackenzie King†
Grenville—Dundas	James Franklin Casselman; 5,102	Arza Clair Casselman; 8,450	Arthur Nelson Orr; 496		Azra Clair Casselman
Lanark	Frederick Sylvester Doyle; 6,682	William Gourlay Blair; 10,921	William Powell; 632		William Gourlay Blair
Leeds	George Fulford; 10,080	John Lionel Carroll; 9,302	Stewart Hastie; 699		George Webb
Ottawa East	Jean-Thomas Richard; 20,895	Lionel Choquette; 5,499	Henri Robert; 1,363	Joseph-Albert Pinard (I. Lib); 1,108; Edward Victor O'Meara (I. PC); 777; Patrice Brunet (SC); 208	Jean-Thomas Richard
Ottawa West	George McIlraith; 24,295	Osmond Francis Howe; 15,010	Walter B. Mann; 2,754		George McIlraith
Prescott	Élie-Oscar Bertrand; 5,380	Joseph St-Denis; 1,928		Raymond Bruneau (I. Lib); 5,380	Élie-Oscar Bertrand
Russell	Joseph-Omer Gour; 12,635	Moïse Gendron; 5,767	Ernest Cousineau; 1,112	Adrien Papineau (SC); 538	Joseph-Omer Gour
Stormont	Lionel Chevrier; 12,639	Frank Thomas Shaver; 6,670	Alexander Francis Mullin; 1,283	Lucien St-Amour (UE); 252	Lionel Chevrier

== 1945 ==
Electoral district	Candidates				Incumbent
Electoral district	Liberal	PC	CCF	Other	Incumbent
Carleton	Leonard A. Davis; 5,309	George Russell Boucher; 10,916	Douglas D. Irwin; 1,309		George Russell Boucher
Glengarry	William B. MacDiarmid; 4,934	Lionel Devaux; 2,881	John A. Dewar; 411		William B. MacDiarmid
Grenville—Dundas	James Franklin Casselman; 4,634	Arza Clair Casselman; 9,306	James Shortt; 685		Azra Clair Casselman
Lanark	Bert Soper; 6,053	William Gourlay Blair; 10,350	Laurie A. Hetanen; 753		Bert Soper
Leeds	George Fulford; 8,263	George Webb; 9,714	Albert Earl Godfrey; 907		George Fulford
Ottawa East	Jean-Thomas Richard; 15,014	Henri Saint-Jacques; 6,013	Armand Ducharme; 2,188	Joseph-Albert Pinard (I. Lib); 6,284; Joseph-Ubald Dupont (SC); 374; James A. Cronier (I. PC); 295; Max Feller (Ind.); 176	Joseph-Albert Pinard
Ottawa West	George McIlraith; 24,458	Norman B. Macrostie; 21,993	Walter B. Mann; 4,824	Harry Binder (LPP); 602; Kenneth L. McCuaig (SC); 495; Sydney Tom Checkland (Ind.); 177	George McIlraith
Prescott	Élie-Oscar Bertrand; 6,623	Louis-Pierre Cécile; 1,753	Bernard Dupuis; 408	Léandre Maisonneuve (BP); 1,500	Élie-Oscar Bertrand
Russell	Joseph-Omer Gour; 5,519	Frederic-A. Caillier; 3,217	Thomas Keenan; 600	Antonin Lalonde (Ind.); 2,708; Harvey Turner (SC); 340	Alfred Goulet†
Stormont	Lionel Chevrier; 11,702	John Allan Phillips; 6,016	John Charles Steer; 991		Lionel Chevrier

== 1940 ==
Electoral district	Candidates			Incumbent
Electoral district	Liberal	National Government	Other	Incumbent
Carleton	Herbet Samuel Arkell; 6,617	Alonzo Hyndman; 7,736		Alonzo Hyndman
Glengarry	William B. MacDiarmid; 4,578	John David MacRae; 2,813		John David MacRae
Grenville—Dundas	William John Taugher; 5,642	Arza Clair Casselman; 7,225		Azra Clair Casselman
Lanark	Bert Soper; 8,821	Thomas Alfred Thompson; 7,180		Thomas Alfred Thompson
Leeds	George Fulford; 10,322	Hugh Alexander Stewart; 8,227		Hugh Alexander Stewart
Ottawa East	Joseph-Albert Pinard; 12,373	Charles A. Seguin; 6,149	Aurèle Chartrand (I. Lib); 10,526	Joseph-Albert Pinard
Ottawa West	George McIlraith; 27,460	Theodore Howell Leggett; 19,780		T. Franklin Ahearn†
Prescott	Élie-Oscar Bertrand; 6,431	Parnell Tierney; 1,819	Léandre Maisonneuve (I. Lib); 2,028	Élie-Oscar Bertrand
Russell	Alfred Goulet; 6,045	Frederic-A. Caillier; 2,961		Alfred Goulet
Stormont	Lionel Chevrier; 10,197	Elzéar Emard; 6,202		Lionel Chevrier

== 1935 ==
Electoral district	Candidates				Incumbent
Electoral district	Conservative (historical)	Liberal	Reconstruction	Other	Incumbent
Carleton	Alonzo Hyndman; 6,872	Herbet Samuel Arkell; 5,919	Herman Ralph James; 3,431		William Foster Garland†
Glengarry	Angus McGillis; 3,202	John David MacRae; 2,813	John A. MacDonell; 1,052		Angus McGillis
Grenville—Dundas	Arza Clair Casselman; 7,225	Preston Elliott; 6,581	Claude Allison Patterson; 1,615		Azra Clair Casselman
Lanark	Thomas Alfred Thompson; 8,043	Bert Soper; 7,381	George L. Comba; 2,252		Thomas Alfred Thompson
Leeds	Hugh Alexander Stewart; 9,487	Donald Elswood Lewis; 8,737	Frank William Logan; 892		Hugh Alexander Stewart
Ottawa East	Lionel Choquette; 3,701	Edgar Rodolphe Chevrier; 16,598	Wilbert Spearman; 1,617	Jean Tisson (AC); 3,961	Edgar Rodolphe Chevrier & T. Franklin Ahearn; Ottawa (City of)
Ottawa West	Hammett P. Hill; 15,219	T. Franklin Ahearn; 21,503	Franklin Deans Burkholder; 7,274	William Joseph Press (I. Lib); 210	Edgar Rodolphe Chevrier & T. Franklin Ahearn; Ottawa (City of)
Prescott	Joseph St-Denis; 1,614	Élie-Oscar Bertrand; 6,034		Louis-Mathias Auger (I. Lib); 3,620	Élie-Oscar Bertrand
Russell	Mathias Landry; 1,368	Alfred Goulet; 5,041	Marshall Rathwell; 1,423	John Rudolphus Booth (I. Lib); 2,897; Joseph Alvary Brisson (I. Lib); 862	Alfred Goulet
Stormont	Frank Thomas Shaver; 6,655	Lionel Chevrier; 9,233	Nathan Copeland; 980		Frank Thomas Shaver
