= By-elections to the 23rd Canadian Parliament =

By-elections to the 23rd Canadian Parliament were held to fill vacancies in the House of Commons of Canada between the 1957 federal election and the 1958 federal election. The Progressive Conservative Party of Canada led a minority government for the 23rd Canadian Parliament.

Three vacant seats were filled through by-elections.

By-election	Date	Incumbent	Party	Winner	Party	Cause	Retained
Yukon	December 16, 1957	James Aubrey Simmons	Liberal	Erik Nielsen	Progressive Conservative	Election declared void	No
Hastings—Frontenac	November 4, 1957	George Stanley White	Progressive Conservative	Sidney Earle Smith	Progressive Conservative	Called to the Senate	Yes
Lanark	August 26, 1957	William G. Blair	Progressive Conservative	George Doucett	Progressive Conservative	Death	Yes

== See also ==
- List of federal by-elections in Canada

== Sources ==
- Parliament of Canada–Elected in By-Elections
