= 23rd Canadian Parliament =

1957–58 national legislative term

- Minority parliament
- Oct. 14, 1957 – Feb. 1, 1958

Parliament leaders
- Prime minister: John Diefenbaker; Jun. 21, 1957 – Apr. 22, 1963
- Cabinet: 18th Canadian Ministry
- Leader of the Opposition: Louis St. Laurent; June 21, 1957 – January 16, 1958
- Lester B. Pearson; January 16, 1958 – April 22, 1963

Party caucuses
- Government: Progressive Conservative Party
- Opposition: Liberal Party
- Crossbench: Co-operative Commonwealth Federation
- Social Credit Party

House of Commons
- Seating arrangements of the House of Commons
- Speaker of the Commons: Roland Michener; October 14, 1957 – September 26, 1962
- Government House leader: Howard Charles Green; October 14, 1957 – July 18, 1959
- Opposition House leader: Lionel Chevrier; October 14, 1957 – February 5, 1963
- Members: 265 MP seats List of members

Senate
- Speaker of the Senate: Mark Robert Drouin; October 4, 1957 – September 23, 1962
- Government Senate leader: John Thomas Haig; October 9, 1957 − May 11, 1958
- Opposition Senate leader: William Ross Macdonald; June 21, 1957 – April 22, 1963
- Senators: 102 senator seats List of senators

Sovereign
- Monarch: Elizabeth II; February 6, 1952 – September 8, 2022
- Governor general: Vincent Massey; 28 February 1952 – 15 September 1959

Sessions
- 1st session October 14, 1957 – February 1, 1958
| ← 22nd | → 24th |

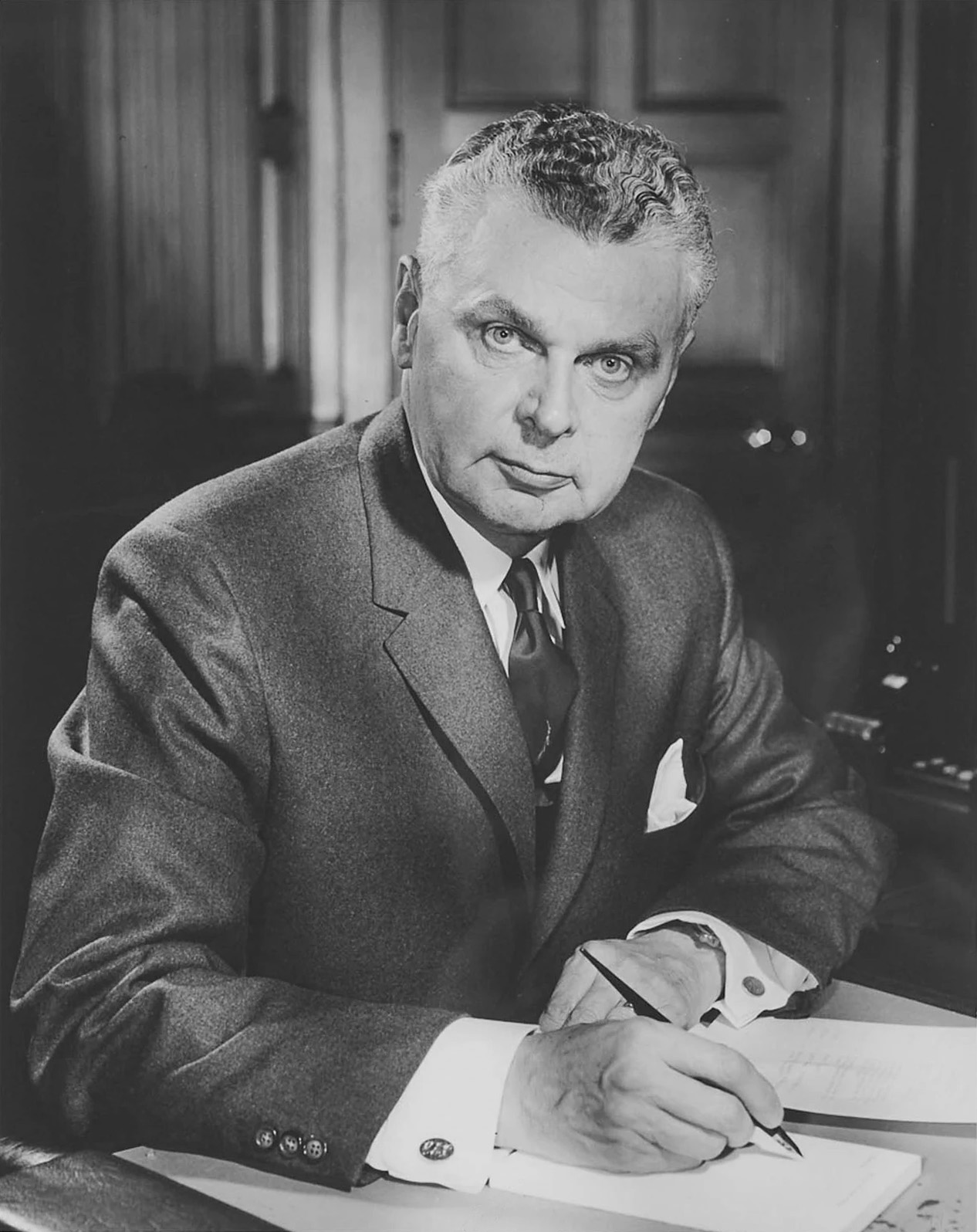
John Diefenbaker (pictured here in 1957) was Prime Minister during the 23rd Canadian Parliament.

The 23rd Canadian Parliament was in session from October 14, 1957, until February 1, 1958. The membership was set by the 1957 federal election on June 10, 1957, and it changed only somewhat due to resignations and by-elections until it was dissolved prior to the 1958 election.

There was only one session of the 23rd Parliament:

| Session | Start | End |
|---|---|---|
| 1st | October 14, 1957 | February 1, 1958 |

== Overview ==
It was controlled by a Progressive Conservative Party minority under Prime Minister John Diefenbaker and the 18th Canadian Ministry. The Official Opposition was the Liberal Party, led first by Louis St. Laurent, and then by Lester B. Pearson.

It was the second shortest parliament in Canadian history.

== Party standings ==
| Number of members per party | Party leader | General Election |
| Number of members per party | Party leader | June 10, 1957 |
|---|---|---|
| Progressive Conservative | John Diefenbaker | 112 |
| Liberal | Louis St. Laurent | 105 |
| Co-operative Commonwealth | M.J. Coldwell | 25 |
| Social Credit | Solon Low | 19 |
| Other | | 4 |
| Total Seats | | 265 |

== Major events ==
=== Parliament opened by the queen ===
It was the first parliament opened by the Monarch of Canada, and the only parliament formally opened by Queen Elizabeth II herself, rather than her formal representative, the governor general. In 2025, King Charles III opened the 45th Canadian Parliament, marking the second time any monarch has opened parliament.

=== First woman appointed to cabinet ===
Diefenbaker appointed Ellen Fairclough, MP for Hamilton West, as Secretary of State in 1957, marking the first time a woman had been appointed to a cabinet position.

== Ministry ==
The 18th Canadian Ministry began at the beginning of the 23rd Canadian Parliament and lasted until near the end of the 25th Canadian Parliament.

== Officeholders ==
=== Head of State ===
| Office | Photo | Name | Assumed office | Left office |
|---|---|---|---|---|
| Sovereign | | Elizabeth II | February 6, 1952 | September 8, 2022 |
| Governor General | | Vincent Massey | February 28, 1952 | September 15, 1959 |

=== Party leadership ===
| Party | Photo | Name | Assumed office | Left office |
|---|---|---|---|---|
| Progressive Conservative | | John Diefenbaker | December 14, 1956 | September 8, 1967 |
| Liberal | | Louis St. Laurent | August 7, 1948 | January 16, 1958 |
| Liberal | | Lester B. Pearson | January 16, 1958 | April 6, 1968 |
| Social Credit | | Solon Earl Low | April 6, 1944 | March 9, 1967 |
| CCF | | M.J. Coldwell | July 29, 1942 | August 10, 1960 |

=== House of Commons ===
==== Presiding officer ====
| Office | Photo | Officer | Riding | Assumed office | Left office | Party |
|---|---|---|---|---|---|---|
| Speaker of the House of Commons | | Roland Michener | St. Paul's | October 14, 1957 | September 27, 1962 | Progressive Conservative |

==== Government leadership (Progressive Conservative) ====
| Office | Photo | Officer | Riding | Assumed office | Left office |
|---|---|---|---|---|---|
| Prime Minister | | John Diefenbaker | Prince Albert | June 21, 1957 | April 22, 1963 |
| House Leader | | Howard Charles Green | Vancouver South | October 14, 1957 | July 18, 1959 |

== Changes to party standings ==
=== By-elections ===
| By-election | Date | Incumbent | Party | Winner | Party | Cause | Retained |
|---|---|---|---|---|---|---|---|
| Yukon | December 16, 1957 | James Aubrey Simmons | Liberal | Erik Nielsen | Progressive Conservative | Election declared void | No |
| Hastings—Frontenac | November 4, 1957 | George Stanley White | Progressive Conservative | Sidney Earle Smith | Progressive Conservative | Called to the Senate | Yes |
| Lanark | August 26, 1957 | William G. Blair | Progressive Conservative | George Doucett | Progressive Conservative | Death | Yes |

== Parliamentarians ==
=== House of Commons ===
Following is a full list of members of the twenty-third Parliament listed first by province or territory, then by electoral district.

Key:

- Party leaders are italicized.
- Parliamentary assistants is indicated by "‡".
- Cabinet ministers are in **boldface**.
- The Prime Minister is **both**.
- The Speaker is indicated by "(†)".

Electoral districts denoted by an asterisk (*) indicates that district was represented by two members.

==== Alberta ====
| Electoral district | Name | Party | First elected/previously elected | No. of terms |
|---|---|---|---|---|
| Acadia | Victor Quelch | Social Credit | 1935 | 6th term |
| Athabaska | Joseph Miville Dechene | Liberal | 1940 | 5th term |
| Battle River—Camrose | James Alexander Smith | Social Credit | 1955 | 2nd term |
| Bow River | Charles Edward Johnston | Social Credit | 1935 | 6th term |
| Calgary North | **Douglas Harkness** | Progressive Conservative | 1945 | 4th term |
| Calgary South | Arthur Ryan Smith | Progressive Conservative | 1957 | 1st term |
| Edmonton East | Ambrose Holowach | Social Credit | 1953 | 2nd term |
| Edmonton—Strathcona | Sydney Herbert Thompson | Social Credit | 1957 | 1st term |
| Edmonton West | Marcel Lambert ‡ | Progressive Conservative | 1957 | 1st term |
| Jasper—Edson | Charles Yuill | Social Credit | 1953 | 2nd term |
| Lethbridge | John Horne Blackmore | Social Credit | 1935 | 6th term |
| Macleod | Ernest George Hansell | Social Credit | 1935 | 6th term |
| Medicine Hat | Bud Olson | Social Credit | 1957 | 1st term |
| Peace River | Solon Earl Low | Social Credit | 1945 | 4th term |
| Red Deer | Frederick Davis Shaw | Social Credit | 1940 | 5th term |
| Vegreville | Peter Stefura | Social Credit | 1957 | 1st term |
| Wetaskiwin | Ray Thomas | Social Credit | 1949 | 3rd term |

==== British Columbia ====
| Electoral district | Name | Party | First elected/previously elected | No. of terms |
|---|---|---|---|---|
| Burnaby—Coquitlam | Erhart Regier | C.C.F. | 1953 | 2nd term |
| Burnaby—Richmond | Thomas Irwin | Social Credit | 1957 | 1st term |
| Cariboo | Bert Leboe | Social Credit | 1953 | 2nd term |
| Coast—Capilano | James Sinclair | Liberal | 1940 | 5th term |
| Comox—Alberni | Thomas Speakman Barnett | C.C.F. | 1953 | 2nd term |
| Esquimalt—Saanich | **George Pearkes** | Progressive Conservative | 1945 | 4th term |
| Fraser Valley | Alexander Bell Patterson | Social Credit | 1953 | 2nd term |
| Kamloops | **Davie Fulton** | Progressive Conservative | 1945 | 4th term |
| Kootenay East | Jim Byrne | Liberal | 1949 | 3rd term |
| Kootenay West | Herbert Wilfred Herridge | C.C.F. | 1945 | 4th term |
| Nanaimo | Colin Cameron | C.C.F. | 1953 | 2nd term |
| New Westminster | George Hahn | Social Credit | 1953 | 2nd term |
| Okanagan Boundary | Frank Christian | Social Credit | 1957 | 1st term |
| Okanagan—Revelstoke | George McLeod | Social Credit | 1953 | 2nd term |
| Skeena | Frank Howard | C.C.F. | 1957 | 1st term |
| Vancouver—Burrard | John Russell Taylor | Progressive Conservative | 1957 | 1st term |
| Vancouver Centre | Douglas Jung | Progressive Conservative | 1957 | 1st term |
| Vancouver East | Harold Winch | C.C.F. | 1953 | 2nd term |
| Vancouver Kingsway | Alexander Macdonald | C.C.F. | 1957 | 1st term |
| Vancouver Quadra | **Howard Charles Green** | Progressive Conservative | 1935 | 6th term |
| Vancouver South | Ernest James Broome | Progressive Conservative | 1957 | 1st term |
| Victoria | Albert McPhillips | Progressive Conservative | 1957 | 1st term |

==== Manitoba ====
| Electoral district | Name | Party | First elected/previously elected | No. of terms |
|---|---|---|---|---|
| Brandon—Souris | Walter Dinsdale ‡ | Progressive Conservative | 1951 | 3rd term |
| Churchill | Robert Simpson | Progressive Conservative | 1957 | 1st term |
| Dauphin | Fred Zaplitny | C.C.F. | 1945, 1953 | 3rd term* |
| Lisgar | George Muir | Progressive Conservative | 1957 | 1st term |
| Marquette | Nick Mandziuk | Progressive Conservative | 1957 | 1st term |
| Portage—Neepawa | George Fairfield | Progressive Conservative | 1957 | 1st term |
| Provencher | Warner Jorgenson | Progressive Conservative | 1957 | 1st term |
| Selkirk | William Bryce | C.C.F. | 1954 | 2nd term |
| Springfield | Jacob Schulz | C.C.F. | 1957 | 1st term |
| St. Boniface | Louis Deniset | Liberal | 1957 | 1st term |
| Winnipeg North | Alistair Stewart | C.C.F. | 1945 | 4th term |
| Winnipeg North Centre | Stanley Knowles | C.C.F. | 1942 | 5th term |
| Winnipeg South | Gordon Chown | Progressive Conservative | 1957 | 1st term |
| Winnipeg South Centre | **Gordon Churchill** | Progressive Conservative | 1951 | 3rd term |

==== New Brunswick ====
| Electoral district | Name | Party | First elected/previously elected | No. of terms |
|---|---|---|---|---|
| Charlotte | A. Wesley Stuart | Liberal | 1945 | 4th term |
| Gloucester | Hédard Robichaud | Liberal | 1953 | 2nd term |
| Kent | Hervé Michaud | Liberal | 1953 | 2nd term |
| Northumberland—Miramichi | George Roy McWilliam | Liberal | 1949 | 3rd term |
| Restigouche—Madawaska | Charles Van Horne | Progressive Conservative | 1955 | 2nd term |
| Royal | **Alfred Johnson Brooks** | Progressive Conservative | 1935 | 6th term |
| St. John—Albert | Thomas Miller Bell ‡ | Progressive Conservative | 1953 | 2nd term |
| Victoria—Carleton | Gage Montgomery | Progressive Conservative | 1952 | 3rd term |
| Westmorland | Henry Murphy | Liberal | 1949 | 3rd term |
| York—Sunbury | John Chester MacRae | Progressive Conservative | 1957 | 1st term |

==== Newfoundland ====
| Electoral district | Name | Party | First elected/previously elected | No. of terms |
|---|---|---|---|---|
| Bonavista—Twillingate | Jack Pickersgill | Liberal | 1953 | 2nd term |
| Burin—Burgeo | Chesley William Carter | Liberal | 1949 | 3rd term |
| Grand Falls—White Bay—Labrador | Thomas G. W. Ashbourne | Liberal | 1949 | 3rd term |
| Humber—St. George's | Herman Maxwell Batten | Liberal | 1953 | 2nd term |
| St. John's East | James McGrath | Progressive Conservative | 1957 | 1st term |
| St. John's West | **William Joseph Browne** | Progressive Conservative | 1949, 1957 | 2nd term* |
| Trinity—Conception | Leonard Stick | Liberal | 1949 | 3rd term |

==== Northwest Territories ====
| Electoral district | Name | Party | First elected/previously elected | No. of terms |
|---|---|---|---|---|
| Mackenzie River | Merv Hardie | Liberal | 1953 | 2nd term |

==== Nova Scotia ====
| Electoral district | Name | Party | First elected/previously elected | No. of terms |
|---|---|---|---|---|
| Antigonish—Guysborough | Angus Ronald Macdonald ‡ | Progressive Conservative | 1957 | 1st term |
| Cape Breton North and Victoria | Robert Muir | Progressive Conservative | 1957 | 1st term |
| Cape Breton South | Donald MacInnis | Progressive Conservative | 1957 | 1st term |
| Colchester—Hants | Cyril Kennedy | Progressive Conservative | 1957 | 1st term |
| Cumberland | Robert Coates | Progressive Conservative | 1957 | 1st term |
| Digby—Annapolis—Kings | **George Nowlan** | Progressive Conservative | 1948, 1950 | 4th term* |
| Halifax* | Robert McCleave | Progressive Conservative | 1957 | 1st term |
| Halifax* | Edmund L. Morris | Progressive Conservative | 1957 | 1st term |
| Inverness—Richmond | Allan MacEachen | Liberal | 1953 | 2nd term |
| Pictou | Russell MacEwan | Progressive Conservative | 1957 | 1st term |
| Queens—Lunenburg | Lloyd Crouse | Progressive Conservative | 1957 | 1st term |
| Shelburne—Yarmouth—Clare | Thomas Kirk | Liberal | 1949 | 3rd term |

==== Ontario ====
| Electoral district | Name | Party | First elected/previously elected | No. of terms |
|---|---|---|---|---|
| Algoma East | Lester B. Pearson | Liberal | 1948 | 4th term |
| Algoma West | George E. Nixon | Liberal | 1940 | 5th term |
| Brantford | Jack Wratten | Progressive Conservative | 1957 | 1st term |
| Brant—Haldimand | John A. Charlton ‡ | Progressive Conservative | 1945 | 4th term |
| Broadview | **George Hees** | Progressive Conservative | 1950 | 3rd term |
| Bruce | Andrew E. Robinson | Progressive Conservative | 1945, 1953 | 3rd term* |
| Carleton | Dick Bell ‡ | Progressive Conservative | 1957 | 1st term |
| Cochrane | Joseph-Anaclet Habel | Liberal | 1953 | 2nd term |
| Danforth | Robert Small | Progressive Conservative | 1953 | 2nd term |
| Davenport | Douglas Morton | Progressive Conservative | 1957 | 1st term |
| Dufferin—Simcoe | William Earl Rowe | Progressive Conservative | 1925 | 9th term |
| Durham | Percy Vivian | Progressive Conservative | 1957 | 1st term |
| Eglinton | **Donald Fleming** | Progressive Conservative | 1945 | 4th term |
| Elgin | James Alexander McBain | Progressive Conservative | 1954 | 2nd term |
| Essex East | Paul Martin Sr. | Liberal | 1935 | 6th term |
| Essex South | Richard Thrasher | Progressive Conservative | 1957 | 1st term |
| Essex West | Donald Ferguson Brown | Liberal | 1945 | 4th term |
| Fort William | Daniel McIvor | Liberal | 1935 | 6th term |
| Glengarry—Prescott | Osie Villeneuve | Progressive Conservative | 1957 | 1st term |
| Greenwood | **James Macdonnell** | Progressive Conservative | 1945, (Note: Muskoka—Ontario) 1949 | 4th term* |
| Grenville—Dundas | Arza Clair Casselman | Progressive Conservative | 1921, 1925 | 10th term* |
| Grey—Bruce | Eric Winkler | Progressive Conservative | 1957 | 1st term |
| Grey North | Percy Verner Noble | Progressive Conservative | 1957 | 1st term |
| Halton | Charles Best | Progressive Conservative | 1957 | 1st term |
| Hamilton East | Quinto Martini | Progressive Conservative | 1957 | 1st term |
| Hamilton South | Bob McDonald | Progressive Conservative | 1957 | 1st term |
| Hamilton West | **Ellen Fairclough** | Progressive Conservative | 1950 | 3rd term |
| Hastings—Frontenac | George Stanley White (until 20 August 1957 Senate appointment) | Progressive Conservative | 1940 | 5th term |
| Hastings—Frontenac | **Sidney Smith** (by-election of 1957-11-04) | Progressive Conservative | 1957 | 1st term |
| Hastings South | Lee Grills | Progressive Conservative | 1957 | 1st term |
| High Park | John Kucherepa | Progressive Conservative | 1957 | 1st term |
| Huron | Elston Cardiff | Progressive Conservative | 1940 | 5th term |
| Kenora—Rainy River | William Moore Benidickson | Liberal-Labour | 1945 | 4th term |
| Kent | Blake Huffman | Liberal | 1949 | 3rd term |
| Kingston | William James Henderson | Liberal | 1949 | 3rd term |
| Lambton—Kent | Ernest Campbell | Progressive Conservative | 1957 | 1st term |
| Lambton West | Joseph Warner Murphy | Progressive Conservative | 1945 | 4th term |
| Lanark | William Gourlay Blair (died 16 June 1957) | Progressive Conservative | 1945 | 4th term |
| Lanark | George Doucett (by-election of 1957-08-26) | Progressive Conservative | 1957 | 1st term |
| Leeds | Hayden Stanton | Progressive Conservative | 1953 | 2nd term |
| Lincoln | John Smith | Progressive Conservative | 1957 | 1st term |
| London | Ernest Halpenny ‡ | Progressive Conservative | 1957 | 1st term |
| Middlesex East | Harry Oliver White | Progressive Conservative | 1945 | 4th term |
| Middlesex West | William Howell Arthur Thomas | Progressive Conservative | 1957 | 1st term |
| Niagara Falls | William Houck | Liberal | 1953 | 2nd term |
| Nickel Belt | Léo Gauthier | Liberal | 1945 | 4th term |
| Nipissing | Jack Garland | Liberal | 1949 | 3rd term |
| Norfolk | Evans Knowles | Progressive Conservative | 1957 | 1st term |
| Northumberland | Ben Thompson | Progressive Conservative | 1957 | 1st term |
| Ontario | **Michael Starr** | Progressive Conservative | 1952 | 3rd term |
| Ottawa East | Jean-Thomas Richard | Liberal | 1945 | 4th term |
| Ottawa West | George McIlraith | Liberal | 1940 | 5th term |
| Oxford | Wally Nesbitt ‡ | Progressive Conservative | 1953 | 2nd term |
| Parkdale | Arthur Maloney ‡ | Progressive Conservative | 1957 | 1st term |
| Parry Sound-Muskoka | Gordon Aiken | Progressive Conservative | 1957 | 1st term |
| Peel | John Pallett | Progressive Conservative | 1954 | 2nd term |
| Perth | **J. Waldo Monteith** | Progressive Conservative | 1953 | 2nd term |
| Peterborough | Gordon Fraser | Progressive Conservative | 1940 | 5th term |
| Port Arthur | Doug Fisher | C.C.F. | 1957 | 1st term |
| Prince Edward—Lennox | Clarence Milligan | Progressive Conservative | 1957 | 1st term |
| Renfrew North | James Forgie | Liberal | 1953 | 2nd term |
| Renfrew South | James William Baskin | Progressive Conservative | 1957 | 1st term |
| Rosedale | David James Walker ‡ | Progressive Conservative | 1957 | 1st term |
| Russell | Joseph-Omer Gour | Liberal | 1945 | 4th term |
| St. Paul's | Roland Michener (†) | Progressive Conservative | 1953 | 2nd term |
| Simcoe East | Philip Bernard Rynard | Progressive Conservative | 1957 | 1st term |
| Simcoe North | Heber Smith | Progressive Conservative | 1957 | 1st term |
| Spadina | Charles Edward Rea | Progressive Conservative | 1955 | 2nd term |
| Stormont | Albert Lavigne | Liberal | 1954 | 2nd term |
| Sudbury | Rodger Mitchell | Liberal | 1953 | 2nd term |
| Timiskaming | Arnold Peters | C.C.F. | 1957 | 1st term |
| Timmins | Murdo Martin | C.C.F. | 1957 | 1st term |
| Trinity | Stanley Haidasz | Liberal | 1957 | 1st term |
| Victoria | Clayton Hodgson ‡ | Progressive Conservative | 1945 | 4th term |
| Waterloo North | Norman Schneider | Liberal | 1952 | 3rd term |
| Waterloo South | William Anderson | Progressive Conservative | 1957 | 1st term |
| Welland | William Hector McMillan | Liberal | 1950 | 3rd term |
| Wellington—Huron | Marvin Howe | Progressive Conservative | 1953 | 2nd term |
| Wellington South | Alfred Hales | Progressive Conservative | 1957 | 1st term |
| Wentworth | Frank Lennard | Progressive Conservative | 1935, 1945 | 5th term* |
| York Centre | Fred C. Stinson | Progressive Conservative | 1957 | 1st term |
| York East | Robert Henry McGregor | Progressive Conservative | 1926 | 8th term |
| York—Humber | Margaret Aitken | Progressive Conservative | 1953 | 2nd term |
| York North | Cecil Cathers | Progressive Conservative | 1957 | 1st term |
| York—Scarborough | Frank Charles McGee | Progressive Conservative | 1957 | 1st term |
| York South | William George Beech | Progressive Conservative | 1957 | 1st term |
| York West | John Borden Hamilton ‡ | Progressive Conservative | 1954 | 2nd term |

==== Prince Edward Island ====
| Electoral district | Name | Party | First elected/previously elected | No. of terms |
|---|---|---|---|---|
| King's | John Augustine Macdonald | Progressive Conservative | 1957 | 1st term |
| Prince | Orville Howard Phillips | Progressive Conservative | 1957 | 1st term |
| Queen's* | **Angus MacLean** | Progressive Conservative | 1951 | 3rd term |
| Queen's* | Heath MacQuarrie | Progressive Conservative | 1957 | 1st term |

==== Quebec ====
| Electoral district | Name | Party | First elected/previously elected | No. of terms |
|---|---|---|---|---|
| Argenteuil—Deux-Montagnes | Philippe Valois | Liberal | 1949 | 3rd term |
| Beauce | Raoul Poulin | Independent | 1949 | 3rd term |
| Beauharnois—Salaberry | Robert Cauchon | Liberal | 1949 | 3rd term |
| Bellechasse | Ovide Laflamme | Liberal | 1955 | 2nd term |
| Berthier—Maskinongé—Delanaudière | Joseph Langlois | Liberal | 1949 | 3rd term |
| Bonaventure | Nérée Arsenault | Progressive Conservative | 1957 | 1st term |
| Brome—Missisquoi | Joseph-Léon Deslières | Liberal | 1952 | 3rd term |
| Cartier | Leon Crestohl | Liberal | 1950 | 3rd term |
| Chambly—Rouville | Yvon L'Heureux | Liberal | 1957 | 1st term |
| Champlain | Joseph Irenée Rochefort | Liberal | 1949 | 3rd term |
| Chapleau | Charles-Noël Barbès | Liberal | 1957 | 1st term |
| Charlevoix | Auguste Maltais | Liberal | 1949 | 3rd term |
| Châteauguay—Huntingdon—Laprairie | Jean Boucher | Liberal | 1953 | 2nd term |
| Chicoutimi | Rosaire Gauthier | Liberal | 1957 | 1st term |
| Compton—Frontenac | Joseph-Adéodat Blanchette | Liberal | 1935 | 6th term |
| Dollard | Guy Rouleau | Liberal | 1953 | 2nd term |
| Dorchester | Joseph-Armand Landry | Liberal | 1957 | 1st term |
| Drummond—Arthabaska | Samuel Boulanger | Independent Liberal | 1957 | 1st term |
| Gaspé | Roland English | Progressive Conservative | 1957 | 1st term |
| Gatineau | Rodolphe Leduc | Liberal | 1936, 1954 | 4th term* |
| Hochelaga | Raymond Eudes | Liberal | 1940 | 5th term |
| Hull | Alexis Caron | Liberal | 1953 | 2nd term |
| Îles-de-la-Madeleine | Charles Cannon | Liberal | 1949 | 3rd term |
| Jacques-Cartier—Lasalle | Robert John Pratt | Progressive Conservative | 1957 | 1st term |
| Joliette—l'Assomption—Montcalm | Maurice Breton | Liberal | 1950 | 3rd term |
| Kamouraska | Benoît Chabot | Independent | 1957 | 1st term |
| Labelle | Henri Courtemanche | Independent Progressive Conservative | 1949, 1957 | 2nd term* |
| Lac-Saint-Jean | André Gauthier | Liberal | 1949 | 3rd term |
| Lafontaine | J.-Georges Ratelle | Liberal | 1949 | 3rd term |
| Lapointe | Augustin Brassard | Liberal | 1957 | 1st term |
| Laurier | Lionel Chevrier | Liberal | 1935, (Note: Stormont (Ontario)) 1957 | 6th term* |
| Laval | Léopold Demers | Liberal | 1948 | 4th term |
| Lévis | Maurice Bourget | Liberal | 1940 | 5th term |
| Longueuil | Auguste Vincent | Liberal | 1953 | 2nd term |
| Lotbinière | Raymond O'Hurley ‡ | Progressive Conservative | 1957 | 1st term |
| Maisonneuve—Rosemont | Jean-Paul Deschatelets | Liberal | 1953 | 2nd term |
| Matapédia—Matane | Léandre Thibault | Liberal | 1953 | 2nd term |
| Mégantic | Joseph Lafontaine | Liberal | 1940 | 5th term |
| Mercier | Marcel Monette | Liberal | 1949 | 3rd term |
| Montmagny—L'Islet | Jean Lesage | Liberal | 1945 | 4th term |
| Mount Royal | Alan Macnaughton | Liberal | 1949 | 3rd term |
| Nicolet—Yamaska | **Paul Comtois** | Progressive Conservative | 1957 | 1st term |
| Notre-Dame-de-Grâce | **William McLean Hamilton** | Progressive Conservative | 1953 | 2nd term |
| Outremont—St-Jean | Romuald Bourque | Liberal | 1952 | 3rd term |
| Papineau | Adrien Meunier | Liberal | 1953 | 2nd term |
| Pontiac—Témiscamingue | John Hugh Proudfoot | Liberal | 1949 | 3rd term |
| Portneuf | Pierre Gauthier | Liberal | 1936 | 6th term |
| Québec—Montmorency | Wilfrid Lacroix | Liberal | 1935 | 6th term |
| Quebec East | Louis St. Laurent | Liberal | 1942 | 5th term |
| Quebec South | Francis (Frank) Gavan Power | Liberal | 1955 | 2nd term |
| Quebec West | René Bégin | Liberal | 1957 | 1st term |
| Richelieu—Verchères | Lucien Cardin | Liberal | 1952 | 3rd term |
| Richmond—Wolfe | Ernest-Omer Gingras | Liberal | 1949 | 3rd term |
| Rimouski | Gérard Légaré | Liberal | 1953 | 2nd term |
| Roberval | Georges Villeneuve | Liberal | 1953 | 2nd term |
| Saguenay | Lomer Brisson | Liberal | 1949 | 3rd term |
| St. Ann | Gérard Loiselle | Independent Liberal | 1957 | 1st term |
| Saint-Antoine—Westmount | George Carlyle Marler | Liberal | 1954 | 2nd term |
| Saint-Denis | Azellus Denis | Liberal | 1935 | 6th term |
| Saint-Henri | Joseph-Arsène Bonnier | Liberal | 1938 | 6th term |
| Saint-Hyacinthe—Bagot | Théogène Ricard | Progressive Conservative | 1957 | 1st term |
| Saint-Jacques | Roland Beaudry | Liberal | 1945 | 4th term |
| Saint-Jean—Iberville—Napierville | J.-Armand Ménard | Liberal | 1955 | 2nd term |
| St. Lawrence—St. George | Claude Richardson | Liberal | 1954 | 2nd term |
| Sainte-Marie | Hector Dupuis | Liberal | 1953 | 2nd term |
| Saint-Maurice—Laflèche | Joseph-Adolphe Richard | Liberal | 1949 | 3rd term |
| Shefford | Marcel Boivin | Liberal | 1945 | 4th term |
| Sherbrooke | Maurice Gingues | Liberal | 1940 | 5th term |
| Stanstead | Louis-Édouard Roberge | Liberal | 1949 | 3rd term |
| Témiscouata | Jean-Paul St. Laurent | Liberal | 1955 | 2nd term |
| Terrebonne | Raymond Raymond | Liberal | 1957 | 1st term |
| Trois-Rivières | **Léon Balcer** | Progressive Conservative | 1949 | 3rd term |
| Vaudreuil—Soulanges | Louis-René Beaudoin | Liberal | 1945 | 4th term |
| Verdun | Yves Leduc | Liberal | 1954 | 2nd term |
| Villeneuve | Armand Dumas | Liberal | 1949 | 3rd term |

==== Saskatchewan ====
| Electoral district | Name | Party | First elected/previously elected | No. of terms |
|---|---|---|---|---|
| Assiniboia | Hazen Argue | C.C.F. | 1945 | 4th term |
| Humboldt—Melfort | Hugh Alexander Bryson | C.C.F. | 1953 | 2nd term |
| Kindersley | Merv Johnson | C.C.F. | 1953 | 2nd term |
| Mackenzie | Alexander Malcolm Nicholson | C.C.F. | 1940, 1953 | 4th term* |
| Meadow Lake | John Harrison | Liberal | 1949 | 3rd term |
| Melville | James Garfield Gardiner | Liberal | 1936 | 6th term |
| Moose Jaw—Lake Centre | Scoop Lewry | C.C.F. | 1957 | 1st term |
| Moose Mountain | Edward McCullough | C.C.F. | 1945, (Note: Assiniboia) 1953 | 3rd term* |
| Prince Albert | **John Diefenbaker** | Progressive Conservative | 1940 | 5th term |
| Qu'Appelle | **Alvin Hamilton** | Progressive Conservative | 1957 | 1st term |
| Regina City | Claude Ellis | C.C.F. | 1953 | 2nd term |
| Rosetown—Biggar | Major James Coldwell | C.C.F. | 1935 | 6th term |
| Rosthern | Walter Tucker | Liberal | 1935, 1953 | 5th term* |
| Saskatoon | Henry Frank Jones | Progressive Conservative | 1957 | 1st term |
| Swift Current—Maple Creek | Irvin Studer | Liberal | 1949 | 3rd term |
| The Battlefords | Max Campbell | C.C.F. | 1945, 1953 | 3rd term* |
| Yorkton | George Hugh Castleden | C.C.F. | 1940, 1953 | 4th term* |

==== Yukon ====
| Electoral district | Name | Party | First elected/previously elected | No. of terms |
|---|---|---|---|---|
| Yukon | James Aubrey Simmons | Liberal | 1949 | 3rd term |
| Yukon | Erik Nielsen (by-election of 1957-12-16) | Progressive Conservative | 1957 | 1st term |

== Legislation and motions ==
=== Act's which received royal assent under 23rd Parliament ===
==== 1st Session ====
===== Public acts =====
| Date of Assent | Index | Title | Bill Number |
|---|---|---|---|
| October 24, 1957 | 1 | Appropriation Act No. 6, 1957 | 11 |
| November 7, 1957 | 2 | Advance Payments for Prairie Grain Prior to Delivery Thereof, An Act to Provide for | 14 |
| November 7, 1957 | 3 | Old Age Security Act, An Act to Amend | 19 |
| November 21, 1957 | 4 | Blind Persons Act, An Act to Amend | 21 |
| November 21, 1957 | 5 | Disabled Persons Act, An Act to Amend | 23 |
| November 21, 1957 | 6 | Old Age Assistance Act, An Act to Amend | 20 |
| November 21, 1957 | 7 | War Veterans Allowance Act, An Act to Amend | 28 |
| November 28, 1957 | 8 | Unemployment Insurance Act, An Act to Amend | 171 |
| December 5, 1957 | 9 | Appropriation Act No. 7, 1957 | 198 |
| December 20, 1957 | 10 | Buffalo and Fort Erie Public Bridge Company, An Act to Amend an Act Respecting | L6-194 |
| December 20, 1957 | 11 | Canadian and British Insurance Companies Act, An Act to Amend | 169 |
| December 20, 1957 | 12 | Canadian Vessel Construction Assistance Act, An Act to Amend | I-72 |
| December 20, 1957 | 13 | Construction of a Line of Railway by Canadian National Railway Company from Optic Lake to Chisel Lake and the Purchase by Canadian National Railway Company from The International Nickel Company of Canada, Limited of a Line of Railway from Sipiwesk to a Point on Burntwood River Near Mystery Lake, All in the Province of Manitoba | 196 |
| December 20, 1957 | 14 | Excise Tax Act, An Act to Amend | 231 |
| December 20, 1957 | 15 | Export Credits Insurance Act, An Act to Amend | 199 |
| December 20, 1957 | 16 | Hamilton Harbour Commissioners, An Act Respecting | 197 |
| December 20, 1957 | 17 | Income Tax Act, An Act to Amend | 232 |
| December 20, 1957 | 18 | National Housing Act, An Act to Amend | 238 |
| December 20, 1957 | 19 | Pension Act, An Act to Amend | 35 |
| December 20, 1957 | 20 | Unemployment Assistance Act, An Act to Amend | 240 |
| January 7, 1958 | 21 | Appropriation Act No. 1, 1958 | 242 |
| January 31, 1958 | 22 | Agricultural Stabilization Act | 237 |
| January 31, 1958 | 23 | Alberta-North West Territories Act | J-26 |
| January 31, 1958 | 24 | Annual Vacations Act | 16 |
| January 31, 1958 | 25 | Atlantic Provinces Power Development Act | 244 |
| January 31, 1958 | 26 | Beechwood Power Project, An Act to Authorize a Loan to the Government of New Brunswick in Respect of | 243 |
| January 31, 1958 | 27 | Canada-Australia Income Tax Agreement Act, 1958 | 170 |
| January 31, 1958 | 28 | Criminal Code, An Act to Amend | 15 |
| January 31, 1958 | 29 | Federal-Provincial Tax-Sharing Arrangements Act, An Act to Amend | 247 |
| January 31, 1958 | 30 | Northwest Territories Act, An Act to Amend | 249 |

Local and Private Acts

| Date of Assent | Index | Title | Bill Number |
|---|---|---|---|
| November 7, November 21, November 28, December 5 and December 20, 1957 | 31 | St. Mary's River Bridge Company, An Act Respecting | O-5 |
| November 7, November 21, November 28, December 5 and December 20, 1957 | 32 | Hydro Electric Company, Limited, An Act Respecting | G-33 |
| November 7, November 21, November 28, December 5 and December 20, 1957 | 33 | Brazilian Traction, Light and Power Company, Limited, An Act Respecting | H-34 |
| November 7, November 21, November 28, December 5 and December 20, 1957 | 34 | Mexico Tramways Company, An Act Respecting | M-73 |
| November 7, November 21, November 28, December 5 and December 20, 1957 | 35 | Rio de Janeiro Tramway, Light and Power Company, Limited, An Act Respecting | E-31 |
| November 7, November 21, November 28, December 5 and December 20, 1957 | 36 | Sao Paulo Electric Company, Limited, An Act Respecting | F-32 |
| November 7, November 21, November 28, December 5 and December 20, 1957 | 37 | Alaska-Yukon Pipelines Limited, An Act Respecting | XI-102 |
| November 7, November 21, November 28, December 5 and December 20, 1957 | 38 | Ottawa and New York Railway Company, An Act Respecting | D-30 |
| November 7, November 21, November 28, December 5 and December 20, 1957 | 39 | Bell Telephone Company of Canada, An Act Respecting | C-27 |
| November 7, November 21, November 28, December 5 and December 20, 1957 | 40 | British Columbia Telephone Company, An Act Respecting | B-18 |
| November 7, November 21, November 28, December 5 and December 20, 1957 | 41 | Investors Trust Company, An Act to Incorporate | K-29 |

== See also ==
- List of Canadian electoral districts 1952–1966,for a list of the ridings in this parliament.
