= Acclamation =

Type of election without using a ballot

An acclamation is a form of election that does not use a ballot. It derives from the ancient Roman word acclamatio, a kind of ritual greeting and expression of approval or dissent towards imperial officials in certain social contexts.

== Voting ==
=== Voice vote ===
The most frequent type of acclamation is a voice vote, in which the voting group is asked who favors and who opposes the proposed candidate. In the event of a lack of opposition, the candidate is considered elected. In parliamentary procedure, acclamation is a form of unanimous consent.

This form of election is most commonly associated with papal elections (see Acclamation in papal elections), though this method was discontinued by Pope John Paul II's apostolic constitution Universi Dominici gregis. It is also sometimes found in the context of parliamentary decisions, or United States presidential nominating conventions (where it is often used to nominate the running mate and incumbent Presidents).

=== Uncontested election ===
In Canada, a candidate for a parliamentary, legislative or municipal position is said to be elected by acclamation if they have no opponents for the seat, an eventuality that rarely occurs federally, but is more common in legislative elections in the northern territories and municipal elections.

The last instance of an acclamation in an election to the House of Commons of Canada was in 1957, when George Doucett was acclaimed in a by-election following the death of his predecessor William Gourlay Blair. Just two months before, Chesley William Carter had been the last person to be acclaimed in a general election. In the Northwest Territories riding of Inuvik Boot Lake, Floyd Roland was returned by acclamation in two consecutive elections, in 2003 and 2007.

== In ancient Rome ==
Acclamations were ritual verbal expressions of approval and benediction in public (like gladiatorial games) and private life. The departure and return of imperial magistrates was, for example, accompanied by acclamation. In the later Roman Empire, expressions of goodwill were reserved for the emperor and certain relatives, who were greeted in this manner during public appearances on special occasions such as their birthdays. By the 4th century AD, acclamations were compulsory for high-level imperial officials.

== See also ==
- Memorial Acclamation
- Walkover
