= Richard Franklin Preston =

Canadian politician

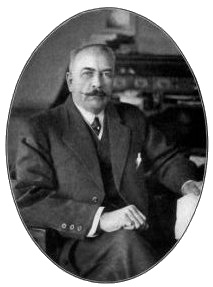

Member of Parliament for Lanark
- In office 1922–1929
- Preceded by: John Alexander Stewart
- Succeeded by: William Samuel Murphy

Ontario MPP
- In office 1905–1919
- Preceded by: William Clyde Caldwell
- Succeeded by: Hiram McCreary
- In office 1894–1898
- Preceded by: William Clyde Caldwell
- Succeeded by: William Clyde Caldwell
- Constituency: Lanark North

Personal details
- Born: October 24, 1860 Leeds County, Canada West
- Died: February 8, 1929 (aged 68)
- Party: Conservative
- Relations: Robert Henry Preston, brother
- Occupation: Physician

Richard Franklin Preston (October 24, 1860 – February 8, 1929) was an Ontario physician and political figure. He represented Lanark North in the Legislative Assembly of Ontario from 1894 to 1898 and from 1905 to 1919 and Lanark in the House of Commons of Canada from 1922 to 1929 as a Conservative member.

He was born in Leeds County, Canada West, the son of Anthony Preston, an Irish immigrant, and was educated at Queen's University. His older brother Robert Henry Preston was also a physician and politician. Preston ran unsuccessfully for the Lanark North seat in the House of Commons in 1900 and 1904. He served as a minister without portfolio in the provincial cabinet from 1914 to 1919. He was first elected to the House of Commons in a 1922 by-election held after the death of John Alexander Stewart.

Preston was reeve and later mayor of Carleton Place. He also served as warden for Lanark County.
