= Communist Party of Canada (Marxist–Leninist) candidates in the 1993 Canadian federal election =

The Communist Party of Canada - Marxist-Leninist (CPC (M-L)) ran fifty-one candidates in the 1993 federal election, none of whom were elected. Information about these candidates may be found here.

== List of candidates ==
=== Ontario (incomplete) ===
Riding	Candidate's Name	Notes	Gender	Residence	Occupation	Votes	%	Rank
Eglinton—Lawrence	Jeanne Gatley	Gatley was active with Toronto's peace movement and in aboriginal rights issues. The 1993 election was her fourth campaign.	F		Graphic artist	138	0.35	7th
Mississauga East	Yvon Turgeon	Turgeon had previously been active in student politics and had contested Verdun—Saint-Paul in the 1988 Canadian federal election, appearing on the ballot as a non-affiliated candidate as the CPC (M-L) was not an established party at the time.	M		Pre-Press Operator	73	0.14	8th
Ottawa—Vanier	Serge Lafortune	Lafortune campaigned against the Charlottetown Accord with party leader Hardial Bains in 1992. He ran in five federal elections in total.	M		Administrative Secretary	141	0.29	9th

Electoral record
Election	Division	Party	Votes	%	Place	Winner
1979 federal	Ottawa—Vanier	M-L	78		7/7	Ron Ritchie, Progressive Conservative
1980 federal	York East	M-L	49		6/6	David Collenette, Liberal
1988 federal	Etobicoke Centre	N/A (M-L)	62		8/8	Michael Wilson, Progressive Conservative
1993 federal	Eglinton—Lawrence	M-L	138	0.35	6/7	Joe Volpe, Liberal

Electoral record
Election	Division	Party	Votes	%	Place	Winner
1979 federal	Ottawa—Vanier	Marxist-Leninist	159		4/4	Jean-Robert Gauthier, Liberal
1980 federal	Ottawa—Vanier	Marxist-Leninist	100		6/6	Jean-Robert Gauthier, Liberal
1988 federal	Hull—Aylmer	N/A (Marxist-Leninist)	134		6/6	Gilles Rocheleau, Liberal
1993 federal	Ottawa—Vanier	Marxist-Leninist	141	0.29	9/10	Jean-Robert Gauthier, Liberal
federal by-election, 13 February 1995	Ottawa—Vanier	Marxist-Leninist	61	0.31	8/0	Mauril Belanger, Liberal
