= John Alexander Craig =

Canadian politician

Ontario MPP
- In office 1934–1937
- Preceded by: New riding
- Succeeded by: George Doucett
- Constituency: Lanark
- In office 1929–1934
- Preceded by: Thomas Alfred Thompson
- Succeeded by: Riding abolished
- Constituency: Lanark North

Personal details
- Born: March 26, 1880; White, Ontario
- Died: November 20, 1968 (aged 88); Renfrew, Ontario
- Political party: Conservative
- Spouse: Alberta Olive Stewart (m. 1904)

John Alexander Craig (March 26, 1880 – November 20, 1968) was a political figure in Ontario. He represented Lanark North in the Legislative Assembly of Ontario from 1929 to 1937 as a Conservative member.

Craig was born in White in Lanark County, the son of John Craig and May Camelot, and was educated there. In 1904, he married Alberta Olive Stewart. Craig served as reeve of Darling township for 15 years He died in 1968 and was buried at Hillcrest Union Cemetery, in Calabogie, Ontario.
