= William Samuel Murphy =

Canadian politician

Member of Parliament for Lanark
- In office July 1929 – May 1930
- Preceded by: Richard Franklin Preston
- Succeeded by: Thomas Alfred Thompson

Personal details
- Born: William Samuel Murphy; 12 February 1882 Portland, Ontario, Canada
- Died: 29 April 1961 (aged 79)
- Party: Independent Conservative
- Spouse(s): Jane Edith Birmingham m. 31 August 1904
- Profession: physician

William Samuel Murphy (12 February 1882 – 29 April 1961) was an Independent Conservative member of the House of Commons of Canada. He was born in Portland, Ontario and became a physician.

Murphy attended public school at Portland, then secondary school at Athens, Ontario before further studies at Queen's University where he earned his Bachelor of Arts and Doctor of Medicine (MD, CM) degrees. He settled in Smiths Falls, Ontario where he became a director of Northern Buttons Ltd. and from 1916 to 1918 served as that town's mayor.

He was first elected to Parliament at the Lanark riding in a by-election on 29 July 1929. After serving for the remainder of the 16th Canadian Parliament, Murphy was defeated in the 1930 federal election by Thomas Alfred Thompson of the Conservatives.
