= Hiram McCreary =

Canadian politician from Ontario

Member of the Ontario Provincial Parliament for Lanark North
- In office October 20, 1919 – May 10, 1923
- Preceded by: Richard Franklin Preston
- Succeeded by: Thomas Alfred Thompson

Personal details
- Party: United Farmers

Hiram McCreary was a Canadian politician from Ontario. He represented Lanark North in the Legislative Assembly of Ontario from 1919 to 1923.

== See also ==
- 15th Parliament of Ontario
