= Thomas Alfred Thompson =

Canadian politician

Member of Parliament for Lanark
- In office 1930–1940
- Preceded by: William Samuel Murphy
- Succeeded by: Bert Soper

Ontario MPP
- In office 1923–1929
- Preceded by: Hiram McCreary
- Succeeded by: John Alexander Craig
- Constituency: Lanark North

Personal details
- Born: August 5, 1868; Ramsay Township, Ontario, Canada
- Died: May 12, 1953 (aged 84)
- Political party: Conservative
- Spouse: Elizabeth W. Morris (m.1897)
- Occupation: Farmer

Thomas Alfred Thompson (August 5, 1868 – May 12, 1953) was a farmer and political figure in Ontario, Canada. He represented Lanark North in the Legislative Assembly of Ontario from 1923 to 1929 and Lanark in the House of Commons of Canada from 1930 to 1940 as a Conservative member.

He was born in Ramsay Township, Ontario, the son of George Thompson. In 1897, he married Elizabeth W. Morris. He served two years as reeve for the township. He also was a public school trustee and was township clerk and treasurer for 20 years. Thompson ran unsuccessful for a federal seat in 1929. He was unsuccessful in a bid for reelection in 1940.
