= Paul Dick =

Canadian politician, broker, and lawyer (1940–2018)

Paul Wyatt Dick, PC (October 27, 1940 – May 2, 2018) was a lawyer, Canadian politician and broker.

He was born in Kapuskasing, Ontario, the son of Wyatt Dick and Constance Grace Harrison, and educated in Arnprior, Port Hope, at the University of Western Ontario and the University of New Brunswick. Dick was called to the Ontario bar in 1969. He served as assistant crown attorney for Carleton County from 1969 until 1972, when he entered private practice in Ottawa. In 1981, he was named Queen's Counsel.

Dick was first elected to the House of Commons of Canada in the 1972 general election as the Progressive Conservative Member of Parliament for Lanark—Renfrew—Carleton. In 1983, he became Deputy Opposition House Leader.

He was appointed a parliamentary secretary following the Tory victory in the 1984 general election under Prime Minister Brian Mulroney. In 1986, Dick was promoted to Cabinet as Associate Minister of National Defence.

He was re-elected as an MP in the 1988 election for the redistributed riding of Lanark—Carleton, and was moved to the position of Minister of Supply and Services in 1989.

When Kim Campbell succeeded Mulroney as prime minister in June 1993, she retained Dick as Supply and Services minister, while adding an appointment as Minister of Public Works. However, in the subsequent 1993 election, Dick was defeated, losing to Liberal Ian Murray by over 18,000 votes.

At 53, and with having spent most of his adult life in politics, Dick found that his political experience counted for little in job interviews. After being turned down for executive or management level positions, Dick found entry-level work at a stock brokerage firm. Dick was successful and ultimately earned a six-figure salary. The story of Dick's life after politics is one of those profiled in the 2003 book The Dark Side: The Personal Price of a Political Life by Steve Paikin.

Dick died at home of a heart attack at the age of 77.

There is a Paul W. Dick fonds at Library and Archives Canada.

Parliament of Canada
| Preceded by Murray McBride | Member of Parliament for Lanark—Renfrew—Carleton; 1972–1988 | Succeeded by Riding Abolished |
| Preceded by Riding Created | Member of Parliament for Lanark—Carleton; 1988–1993 | Succeeded by Ian Murray |
Political offices
| Preceded by Otto Jelinek | Minister of Supply and Services; 1989–1993 | Succeeded by David Dingwall |
| Preceded by Elmer MacKay | Minister of Public Works; 1993 | Succeeded by David Dingwall |
