= Lanark—Renfrew—Carleton =

Former federal electoral district in Ontario, Canada

Ontario electoral district

Defunct federal electoral district
- Legislature: House of Commons
- District created: 1966
- District abolished: 1987
- First contested: 1968
- Last contested: 1984

Lanark–Renfrew–Carleton (also known as Lanark and Renfrew) was a federal electoral district represented in the House of Commons of Canada from 1968 to 1988. It was located in the province of Ontario.

This riding was created as "Lanark and Renfrew" in 1966 from parts of Carleton, Lanark, Renfrew North and Renfrew South ridings.

Lanark and Renfrew was initially defined to consist of:

(a) in the County of Carleton, the Townships of Fitzroy, Huntley, March and Torbolton;

(b) in the County of Lanark, the Townships of Beckwith, Darling, Drummond, Lanark, Pakenham and Ramsay; and

(c) in the County of Renfrew, the Townships of Admaston, Bagot, Blythfield, Bromley, Horton, McNab, Ross and Westmeath.

The name of the electoral district was changed in 1970 to Lanark–Renfrew–Carleton. In 1976, it was redefined to consist of

(a) in the Regional Municipality of Ottawa-Carleton, the Townships of March and West Carleton;

(b) the County of Lanark, including the Town of Smiths Falls; and

(c) in the County of Renfrew, the Townships of Bagot and Blythfield and McNab.

The electoral district was abolished in 1987 when it was redistributed between Lanark–Carleton and Renfrew.

== Members of Parliament ==
This riding has elected the following members of Parliament:

| Parliament | Years | Member | Party |
|---|---|---|---|
Lanark and Renfrew; Riding created from Carleton, Lanark, Renfrew North and Renfrew South
| 28th | 1968–1970 | Murray McBride | Liberal |
Lanark—Renfrew—Carleton
| 28th | 1970–1972 | Murray McBride | Liberal |
| 29th | 1972–1974 | Paul Dick | Progressive Conservative |
| 30th | 1974–1979 | Paul Dick | Progressive Conservative |
| 31st | 1979–1980 | Paul Dick | Progressive Conservative |
| 32nd | 1980–1984 | Paul Dick | Progressive Conservative |
| 33rd | 1984–1988 | Paul Dick | Progressive Conservative |
Riding dissolved into Lanark—Carleton and Renfrew

== Election results ==
=== Lanark and Renfrew ===
1968 Canadian federal election
| Party | Candidate | Votes |
|---|---|---|
| Liberal | Murray McBride | 13,156 |
| Progressive Conservative | James W. Baskin | 12,737 |
| New Democratic | James Ronson | 1,861 |

=== Lanark–Renfrew–Carleton ===
1972 Canadian federal election
| Party | Candidate | Votes |
|---|---|---|
| Progressive Conservative | Paul Dick | 17,893 |
| Liberal | Murray McBride | 13,283 |
| New Democratic | Henry Mellema | 1,819 |

1974 Canadian federal election
| Party | Candidate | Votes |
|---|---|---|
| Progressive Conservative | Paul Dick | 18,242 |
| Liberal | Bud Barrett | 13,009 |
| New Democratic | Stuart Morrison | 3,428 |

1979 Canadian federal election
| Party | Candidate | Votes |
|---|---|---|
| Progressive Conservative | Paul Dick | 24,277 |
| Liberal | Pat Carroll | 10,485 |
| New Democratic | Gord Gilhuly | 5,749 |

1980 Canadian federal election
| Party | Candidate | Votes |
|---|---|---|
| Progressive Conservative | Paul Dick | 20,487 |
| Liberal | Pat Carroll | 11,817 |
| New Democratic | Gord Gilhuly | 4,948 |
| Not affiliated | Stuart Neilson | 247 |

1984 Canadian federal election
| Party | Candidate | Votes |
|---|---|---|
| Progressive Conservative | Paul Dick | 24,395 |
| Liberal | Brooke McNabb | 15,528 |
| New Democratic | Don Page | 5,310 |
| Commonwealth of Canada | Floyd J. Craig | 139 |

== See also ==
- List of Canadian electoral districts
- Historical federal electoral districts of Canada
