= Murray McBride =

Canadian politician

Murray Arndell McBride

Member of Parliament for Lanark and Renfrew
- In office June 1968 – September 1972
- Preceded by: Riding Created
- Succeeded by: Paul Dick

Personal details
- Born: April 28, 1935 Westmeath, Ontario, Canada
- Died: April 23, 2026 (aged 90)
- Party: Liberal
- Profession: Politician, author

Murray Arndell McBride (April 28, 1935 – April 23, 2026) was a Canadian politician and author who served as a Liberal member of the House of Commons of Canada.

Born at Westmeath, Ontario, McBride was first elected at the Lanark and Renfrew riding in the 1968 general election and served only one term, the 28th Canadian Parliament. McBride was defeated in the 1972 election by Paul Dick of the Progressive Conservative party at the riding which became Lanark—Renfrew—Carleton. McBride campaigned for election in the High Park--Humber Valley riding, but was also unsuccessful then. He subsequently did contest a Parliamentary seat.

McBride served as Executive Assistant to the Postmaster General in 1973 and 1974. From 1974 to 1976 he was Executive Assistant to the Minister of Consumer and Corporate Affairs. From 1976 to 1978 he was Vice Chairman and General Manager of the Farm Credit Corporation of Canada and from 1978 to 1979 he was Chairman of the Canadian Egg Marketing Agency.
