= White, Ontario =

White
- Location of White in Ontario
- Coordinates: 49°53′59″N 95°05′49″W
- Country: Canada
- Province: Ontario
- Region: Northwestern Ontario
- District: Kenora
- Part: Kenora, Unorganized
- Elevation: 353 m (1,158 ft)
- Time zone: UTC-6 (Central Time Zone)
  - Summer (DST): UTC-5 (Central Time Zone)
- Postal code FSA: P0Y
- Area code: 807

White is an unincorporated place and railway point in Unorganized Kenora District in northwestern Ontario, Canada.

The place lies on the Canadian National Railway transcontinental main line, between Rice Lake to the west and Copelands Landing to the east, and is passed but not served by Via Rail transcontinental Canadian trains.
