= John Alexander Stewart (politician) =

Canadian politician

John Alexander Stewart, PC (1867 – October 7, 1922) was a Canadian politician.

Born in Renfrew, Ontario, he was a lawyer before being elected to the House of Commons of Canada for the Ontario riding of Lanark. A Unionist, he was appointed Minister of Railways and Canals on September 21, 1921, but served at the post for only three months.
