= Bert Soper =

Canadian politician

Member of Parliament for Lanark
- In office March 1940 – June 1945

Personal details
- Born: Bert H. Soper; 15 March 1884 Frankville, Ontario, Canada
- Died: 2 July 1968 (aged 84)
- Party: Liberal
- Spouse(s): Florence McLennan m. 23 June 1909
- Profession: merchant

Bert H. Soper (15 March 1884 – 2 July 1968) was a Canadian businessman and politician. Soper served as a Liberal party member of the House of Commons of Canada. He was born in Frankville, Ontario and became a merchant by career.

Soper became director of Allan Soper and Company, a coal sales company. He was also involved with Smiths Falls Malleable Castings Ltd.

He was first elected to Parliament at the Lanark riding in the 1940 general election after unsuccessful campaigns there in 1930 and 1935. Soper was defeated in the 1945 election by William Gourlay Blair of the Progressive Conservative party.
