= Jean-Robert Gauthier =

Canadian politician

The Honourable Jean-Robert Gauthier CM OOnt

Canadian Senator from Ontario
- In office November 23, 1994 – October 22, 2004
- Nominated by: Jean Chrétien
- Appointed by: Ray Hnatyshyn
- Division: Ontario (1994–2001); Ottawa-Vanier (2001–2004)

Opposition House Leader
- In office February 7, 1990 – January 29, 1991
- Leader: John Turner; Jean Chrétien
- Preceded by: Herb Gray
- Succeeded by: David Dingwall

Chief Opposition Whip
- In office September 17, 1984 – 1990
- Leader: John Turner; Jean Chrétien
- Preceded by: Chuck Cook
- Succeeded by: David Dingwall

Member of Parliament for Ottawa—Vanier Ottawa East
- In office October 30, 1972 – November 22, 1994
- Preceded by: Jean-Thomas Richard
- Succeeded by: Mauril Bélanger

Personal details
- Born: October 22, 1929 Ottawa, Ontario, Canada
- Died: December 10, 2009 (aged 80) Ottawa, Ontario, Canada
- Party: Liberal
- Spouse: Monique Gauthier
- Profession: Chiropractor

Jean-Robert Gauthier, CM OOnt (October 22, 1929 – December 10, 2009) was a Canadian politician.

== Background ==
A chiropractor by training, he entered politics as trustee on a local school board. He was elected to the House of Commons of Canada to represent the riding of Ottawa East in the 1972 election as a Liberal Party Member of Parliament. He remained its representative for several decades winning by large majorities each time in the safe Liberal seat.

In 1984, he was appointed opposition whip and became a member of the party's shadow cabinet. His highest profile came during his time as official languages critic for the Liberal caucus, in which Gauthier was a strident defender of official bilingualism. Locally, he was known for campaigning to have an aquarium built in Ottawa. With the Liberal victory in the 1993 election, he ran for Speaker of the House but lost to Gilbert Parent.

In 1994, he was appointed to the Senate, where he fought for the rights of French-speaking Canadians. He retired on his 75th birthday in 2004. In the Senate, he listed his Senate division as "Ontario" from November 23, 1994, to December 3, 2001, and as "Ottawa – Vanier" from December 4, 2001, until his retirement.

He was made an Officer of the Legion of Honour by the French Government in 2002. In September 2006, the Jean-Robert Gauthier Catholic Elementary School opened in the Barrhaven district of Ottawa.He was made a member of the Order of Canada in 2007. In 2009, he was made a member of the Order of Ontario.
