= Lanark (federal electoral district) =

Former federal electoral district in Ontario, Canada

Ontario electoral district

Defunct federal electoral district
- Legislature: House of Commons
- District created: 1914
- District abolished: 1966
- First contested: 1917
- Last contested: 1965

Lanark was a federal electoral district represented in the House of Commons of Canada from 1917 to 1968. It was located in the province of Ontario. This riding was first created in 1914 from Lanark North and Lanark South ridings.

It consisted of the county of Lanark.

The electoral district was abolished in 1966 when it was redistributed between Frontenac—Lennox and Addington and Lanark and Renfrew ridings.

== Members of Parliament ==
This riding elected the following members of the House of Commons of Canada:

| Parliament | Years | Member | Party |
|---|---|---|---|
Riding created from Lanark North and Lanark South
| 13th | 1917–1918† | Adelbert Edward Hanna | Government (Unionist) |
| 13th | 1918–1921 | John Alexander Stewart | Government (Unionist) |
| 14th | 1921–1922† | John Alexander Stewart | Conservative |
| 14th | 1922–1925 | Richard Franklin Preston | Conservative |
| 15th | 1925–1926 | Richard Franklin Preston | Conservative |
| 16th | 1926–1929† | Richard Franklin Preston | Conservative |
| 16th | 1929–1930 | William Samuel Murphy | Independent Conservative |
| 17th | 1930–1935 | Thomas Alfred Thompson | Conservative |
| 18th | 1935–1940 | Thomas Alfred Thompson | Conservative |
| 19th | 1940–1945 | Bert Soper | Liberal |
| 20th | 1945–1949 | William Gourlay Blair | Progressive Conservative |
| 21st | 1949–1953 | William Gourlay Blair | Progressive Conservative |
| 22nd | 1953–1957 | William Gourlay Blair | Progressive Conservative |
| 23rd | 1957–1957† | William Gourlay Blair | Progressive Conservative |
| 23rd | 1957–1958 | George Doucett | Progressive Conservative |
| 24th | 1958–1962 | George Doucett | Progressive Conservative |
| 25th | 1962–1963 | George Doucett | Progressive Conservative |
| 26th | 1963–1965 | George Doucett | Progressive Conservative |
| 27th | 1965–1968 | Desmond Code | Progressive Conservative |
Riding dissolved into Lanark and Renfrew and Frontenac—Lennox and Addington

== Electoral history ==
1917 Canadian federal election
| Party | Candidate | Votes |
|---|---|---|
| Government (Unionist) | Adelbert Edward Hanna | 5,816 |
| Opposition (Laurier Liberals) | Boyd Alexander Conyn Caldwell | 2,609 |
| Unknown | George Arthur Burgess | 661 |

On Mr. Hanna's death, 27 February 1918:

By-election on 2 May 1918
| Party | Candidate | Votes |
| Government (Unionist) | John Alexander Stewart | acclaimed |

1921 Canadian federal election
| Party | Candidate | Votes |
|---|---|---|
| Conservative | John Alexander Stewart | 9,250 |
| Progressive | Robert Matheson Anderson | 6,615 |
| Labour | William George Ferguson | 158 |

On Mr. Stewart's death, 7 October 1922:

By-election on 4 December 1922
| Party | Candidate | Votes |
| Conservative | Richard Franklin Preston | 8,497 |
| Liberal | David Findlay | 7,048 |

1925 Canadian federal election
| Party | Candidate | Votes |
|---|---|---|
| Conservative | Richard Franklin Preston | 7,620 |
| Independent | Duncan Herbert Gemmell | 4,416 |

1926 Canadian federal election
| Party | Candidate | Votes |
|---|---|---|
| Conservative | Richard Franklin Preston | 8,122 |
| Liberal–Progressive | George W. Buchanan | 4,908 |

On Mr. Preston's death, 8 February 1929:

By-election on 29 July 1929
| Party | Candidate | Votes |
| Independent Conservative | William Samuel Murphy | 7,174 |
| Conservative | Thomas Alfred Thompson | 5,682 |

1930 Canadian federal election
| Party | Candidate | Votes |
|---|---|---|
| Conservative | Thomas Alfred Thompson | 7,064 |
| Liberal | Bert Soper | 5,699 |
| Independent Conservative | William Samuel Murphy | 3,937 |
| Independent Conservative | Mildred Amelia Low | 75 |

1935 Canadian federal election
| Party | Candidate | Votes |
|---|---|---|
| Conservative | Thomas Alfred Thompson | 8,043 |
| Liberal | Bert Soper | 7,381 |
| Reconstruction | George L. Comba | 2,252 |

1940 Canadian federal election
| Party | Candidate | Votes |
|---|---|---|
| Liberal | Bert Soper | 8,821 |
| National Government | Thomas Alfred Thompson | 7,180 |

1945 Canadian federal election
| Party | Candidate | Votes |
|---|---|---|
| Progressive Conservative | William Gourlay Blair | 10,350 |
| Liberal | Bert Soper | 6,053 |
| Co-operative Commonwealth | Lauri A. Hetanen | 753 |

1949 Canadian federal election
| Party | Candidate | Votes |
|---|---|---|
| Progressive Conservative | William Gourlay Blair | 10,921 |
| Liberal | Frederick Sylvester Doyle | 6,682 |
| Co-operative Commonwealth | William Henry Powell | 632 |

1953 Canadian federal election
| Party | Candidate | Votes |
|---|---|---|
| Progressive Conservative | William Gourlay Blair | 10,029 |
| Liberal | H. Burnett Montgomery | 5,316 |
| Co-operative Commonwealth | William Henry Powell | 451 |

1957 Canadian federal election
| Party | Candidate | Votes |
|---|---|---|
| Progressive Conservative | William Gourlay Blair | 11,629 |
| Liberal | W. Peter Burchell | 4,504 |

On Mr. Blair's death, 16 June 1957:

By-election on 26 August 1957
| Party | Candidate | Votes |
| Progressive Conservative | George Doucett | acclaimed |

1958 Canadian federal election
| Party | Candidate | Votes |
|---|---|---|
| Progressive Conservative | George Doucett | 12,116 |
| Liberal | William Y. Wood | 4,315 |

1962 Canadian federal election
| Party | Candidate | Votes |
|---|---|---|
| Progressive Conservative | George Doucett | 10,462 |
| Liberal | Vincent Kelly | 6,823 |
| Social Credit | R. H. James | 660 |
| New Democratic | Charles Ogilvie | 410 |

1963 Canadian federal election
| Party | Candidate | Votes |
|---|---|---|
| Progressive Conservative | George Doucett | 10,475 |
| Liberal | R. Arthur Stewart | 7,043 |
| New Democratic | James O. W. Griffith | 601 |
| Social Credit | Oscar Wilmot Ventress | 312 |

1965 Canadian federal election
| Party | Candidate | Votes |
|---|---|---|
| Progressive Conservative | Desmond Code | 9,784 |
| Liberal | John Steele Kirkland | 6,826 |
| New Democratic | Stanley Livingstone | 775 |
| Social Credit | William Hunter | 335 |

== See also ==
- List of Canadian electoral districts
- Historical federal electoral districts of Canada
