= Desmond Code =

Canadian politician (1912–1980)

Desmond Morton Code
- Official 1968 portrait

Member of Parliament for Lanark
- In office November 1965 – June 1968

Member of Parliament for Leeds
- In office June 1968 – September 1972

Personal details
- Born: 16 November 1912 Smiths Falls, Ontario, Canada
- Died: 19 January 1980 (aged 67) Kingston, Ontario, Canada
- Party: Progressive Conservative
- Profession: construction superintendent, contractor

Desmond Morton Code (16 November 1912 – 19 January 1980) was a Progressive Conservative party member of the House of Commons of Canada. He was a construction superintendent and contractor by career.

He was first elected at the Lanark riding in the 1965 general election. His second term in Parliament was served at Leeds riding which he won in the 1968 election. Code left federal office in 1972 after completing his term in the 28th Canadian Parliament and has since not campaigned in another federal election.

Code died at a Kingston hospital on 19 January 1980. He was buried at Hillcrest Cemetery in Smiths Falls.
