= Jean-Thomas Richard =

Canadian politician

Member of Parliament for Ottawa East
- In office 1945–1972
- Preceded by: Joseph Albert Pinard
- Succeeded by: Jean-Robert Gauthier

Personal details
- Born: 22 August 1907 Ottawa, Ontario
- Died: 27 September 1991 (aged 84)
- Party: Liberal
- Profession: Barrister, lawyer

Jean-Thomas Richard (22 August 1907 – 27 September 1991) was a Liberal party member of the House of Commons of Canada. He was born in Ottawa, Ontario and became a barrister and lawyer by career.

The son of Thomas-Lucien Richard and Blanche Dunn, he was educated at the University of Ottawa and Osgoode Hall and practised law in Ottawa. In 1933, he married Margaret Maloney.

He was first elected at the Ottawa East riding in the 1945 general election, the re-elected there in 1949, 1953, 1957, 1958, 1962, 1963, 1965 and 1968. After completing his final term in the House of Commons, the 28th Canadian Parliament, Richard left office and did not seek further re-election.
