= George Doucett =

Canadian politician

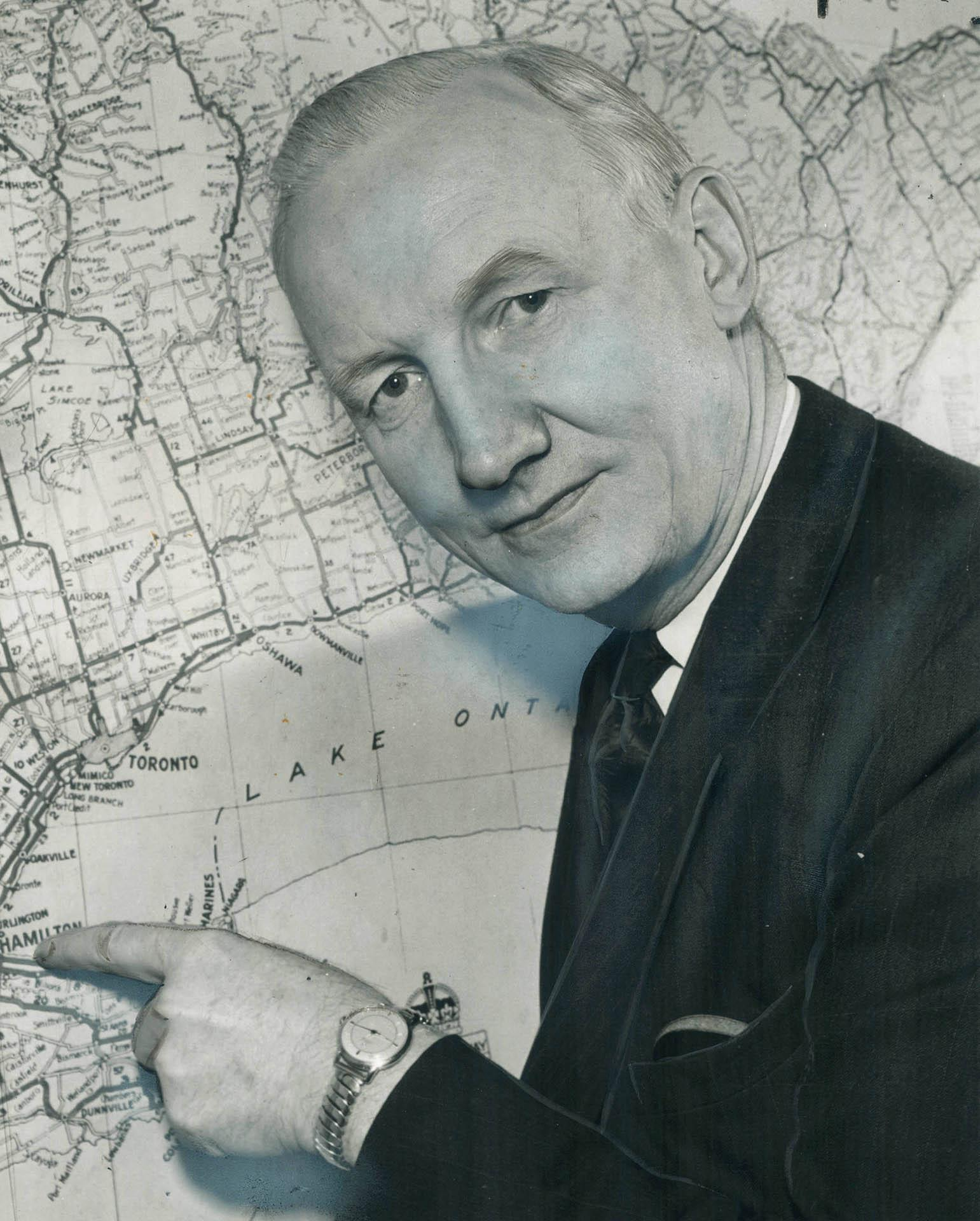
- Doucett in 1951

Member of Parliament for Lanark
- In office 1957–1965
- Preceded by: William Gourlay Blair
- Succeeded by: Desmond Code

Ontario MPP
- In office 1937–1957
- Preceded by: John Alexander Craig
- Succeeded by: John Arthur McCue
- Constituency: Lanark

Personal details
- Born: May 16, 1897; Ramsay Township, Ontario
- Died: May 1, 1974 (aged 76)
- Political party: Conservative
- Spouse: Mona Middleton

George Henry Doucett (May 16, 1897 – May 1, 1974) was a Canadian politician. He was a Progressive Conservative member of the Legislative Assembly of Ontario from 1937 to 1957 and a member of the House of Commons of Canada from 1957 to 1965. He represented the provincial and federal ridings of Lanark in eastern Ontario. He was a member of cabinet in the provincial governments of George Drew, Thomas Kennedy and Leslie Frost. He has the distinction of being the last Canadian federal Member of Parliament to be acclaimed into office.

== Background ==
Doucett was born in Ramsay Township located in Lanark County, Ontario, the son of Joseph Doucett and Martha Irwin, he was a farmer and insurance broker before entering politics. He was married to Mona Middleton in 1965 at the age of 68 while Mona was 60.

== Politics ==
At the age of 21 he was elected as a township councillor of the Ramsay Council. In 1928, he was elected reeve and was elected Warden of Lanark County in 1935.

In 1937, he was elected to the Ontario Legislature representing the riding of Lanark. A member of the Progressive Conservative Party of Ontario, he was re-elected in 1943, 1945, 1948, 1951, and 1955. From 1943 to 1951, he was the Minister of Public Works and the Minister of Highways.

Upon the death of the federal Member of Parliament for Lanark, William Gourlay Blair, in 1957, Doucett resigned from the Ontario Legislature and was acclaimed as a Member of Parliament in a 1957 by-election. He was re-elected in 1958, 1962, and 1963. He did not run in 1965.

=== Cabinet posts ===
Ontario provincial government of Leslie Frost
Cabinet posts (2)
Predecessor	Office	Successor
Thomas McQuesten	Minister of Highways; 1943-1955	James N. Allan
Thomas McQuesten	Minister of Public Works; 1943-1951	Fletcher Stewart Thomas
