= William Gourlay Blair =

Canadian politician

Member of the Canadian Parliament for Lanark
- In office 1945–1957
- Preceded by: Bert H. Soper
- Succeeded by: George Doucett

Personal details
- Born: January 13, 1890 Bathurst Township, Ontario, Canada
- Died: June 16, 1957 (aged 67)
- Party: Progressive Conservative Party
- Occupation: physician

William Gourley Blair (January 13, 1890 in Bathurst Township, Ontario – June 16, 1957) was a politician and physician.

== Career ==
He was elected to the House of Commons of Canada in the 1945 election as a Member of the Progressive Conservative Party to represent the riding of Lanark. He was re-elected in 1949, 1953 and in 1957. He was appointed to the joint committees of Joint Committee on Federal District Commission and Joint Committee on Old Age Security. Prior to his federal political experience, he was a captain in the Royal Canadian Army Medical Corps between 1916 and 1919.
