= 2014 Prescott and Russell United Counties municipal elections =

Elections were held in Prescott and Russell United Counties, Ontario on October 27, 2014 in conjunction with municipal elections across the province.

== Prescott and Russell United Counties Council ==
The Council consists of the mayors of the eight constituent municipalities:

Municipality	Mayor
Alfred and Plantagenet	Fernand Dicaire
Casselman	Conrad Lamadeleine
Champlain	Gary J. Barton (acclaimed)
Clarence-Rockland	Guy Desjardins
East Hawkesbury	Robert Kirby (acclaimed)
Hawkesbury	Jeanne Charlebois
Russell	Election suspended until December following death of candidate
The Nation	François St. Amour

== Mayors and councillors not seeking re-election ==
The following mayors and municipal councillors announced they were not seeking re-election :

Councillors

- Érik Bazinet, Russell
- Craig Cullen, Russell
- Gabriel Dussault, East Hawkesbury
- Mario Laplante, Casselman
- Linda Séguin, East Hawkesbury

== Alfred and Plantagenet ==
Mayoral Candidate	Vote	%
Fernand Dicaire	1,716	44.66
Jean-Yves Lalonde (X)	1,413	36.78
Mario Charlebois	713	18.56

== Casselman ==
Mayoral Candidate	Vote	%
Conrad Lamadeleine	922	46.05
Daniel Lafleur	549	27.42
Francyn A. Leblanc	360	17.98
Claude Levac (X)	171	8.54

== Champlain ==
Mayoral Candidate	Vote	%
Gary J. Barton (X)	Acclaimed	

== Clarence-Rockland ==
Mayoral Candidate	Vote	%
Guy Desjardins	5,617	71.77
Marcel Guibord (X)	2,209	28.23

== East Hawkesbury ==
Mayoral Candidate	Vote	%
Robert Kirby (X)	Acclaimed	

== Hawkesbury ==
Mayoral Candidate	Vote	%
Jeanne Charlebois	2,744	58.40
René Berthiaume (X)	1,335	28.41
Jean Bryant Corbin	620	13.19

== Russell ==
=== Councillors ===
There are 4 seats being contested for Russell Town Council.

Councillors Candidate	Vote	%
Amanda Simard	2763	
Jamie Laurin	2124	
Pierre Leroux	2074	
André D. Brisson	1923	
Cindy Saucier	1411	
Patrick Thibodeau	1246	
Raymond Saint-Pierre	1205	
Ron Barr	1184	
Duane Fitzpatrick	858	

Incumbent Eric Bazinet and interim councillor Calvin Pol are not re-run again in 2014.

=== By-election for mayor ===
A by-election for mayor will be held from December 12 to 15 after the death of Jean-Paul St. Pierre on October 18 at the age of 65, while trying to get re-elected on October 27. One candidate for mayor, his cousin Donald St. Pierre has decided to suspend his campaign until further notice, but he is now registered as one of four candidates.

At least the election of four new candidates for the post of councilors continue as scheduled on October 27. One of the nine candidates Raymond St. Pierre, the brother of former mayor announces that do not intend to present a candidate for mayor, although he stopped campaigning for the time after the announcement the death of his brother.

==== Potential candidates ====
This list is not exhaustive and includes all individuals who have a demonstrated interest in the position of the municipality or whose name has circulated in the media:

- Pierre Leroux, councillor since 2010.
- Donald Saint-Pierre, current candidate for mayor and cousin of Jean-Paul Saint-Pierre.
- Ronald Thériault, Russell's resident.
- Jamie Laurin, current councillor.

==== Declined ====
- Marc-Antoine Gagnier, candidate independent of Glengarry-Prescott-Russell to Ontario election Thursday, June 12, 2014.
- Raymond Saint-Pierre, current candidate for councilor and brother of Jean-Paul Saint-Pierre.

===== Results =====
Mayoral Candidate	Vote	%
Pierre Leroux	1780	
Jamie Laurin	1210	
Donald Saint-Perre	684	
Ronald Thériault	568	

== The Nation ==
Mayoral Candidate	Vote	%
François St. Amour (X)	2,510	56.54
Denis Pommainville	1,929	43.46
