= Éthier =

Éthier (or "Ethier") is a surname. Notable people with the surname include:

- Andre Ethier (born 1982), American baseball player
- Andre Ethier (musician) (born 1977), Canadian singer-songwriter and visual artist
- Denis Éthier (1926–2017), Canadian politician
- Joseph Arthur Calixte Éthier (1868–1936), Canadian politician
- Kathleen Ethier (fl. 2020), American communicable-disease administrator
- Michèle Lamquin-Éthier (born 1946), Canadian politician
- Viateur Éthier (1915–1976), Canadian businessman and politician
