= Glengarry—Prescott—Russell =

Glengarry—Prescott—Russell may refer to:

- Glengarry—Prescott—Russell (federal electoral district)
- Glengarry—Prescott—Russell (provincial electoral district)
