= Jonathan Pitre =

Canadian with a rare genetic mutation called recessive dystrophic epidermolysis bullosa

- Born: June 2, 2000; Russell, Ontario, Canada
- Died: April 4, 2018 (aged 17); Minneapolis, Minnesota, U.S.
- Cause of death: Septic shock
- Known for: Ambassador for DEBRA Canada

Jonathan Pitre (/ˈpiːt/; June 2, 2000 – April 4, 2018) was a Canadian from Russell, Ontario, a small town near Ottawa. Pitre was born with a rare genetic mutation called recessive dystrophic epidermolysis bullosa (RDEB), which causes external and internal blistering across the body. His situation gained widespread attention in October 2012 when he was interviewed by the Ottawa Citizen, and he became an ambassador for DEBRA Canada, a charity devoted to the support and awareness of EB. He went to École Secondaire Catholique Embrun (ESCE) where his sister, Noemie, along with teachers and support staff helped spread awareness about his condition.

On November 21, 2014, the Ottawa Senators made him an "honorary scout" on a one-day ceremonial contract. 2015 saw Pitre address a We Day crowd in Ottawa, and attend the NHL Awards in Las Vegas, invited by the Ottawa Senators, his favourite hockey team. A later TSN documentary about him won a Canadian Screen Award. In July 2018, the Ontario Ball Hockey Association (OBHA) held a tournament in his honour, with part of the entry fee donated to DEBRA Canada.

Pitre received a stem cell transplant at the University of Minnesota Masonic Children's Hospital in Minneapolis, Minnesota, on September 8, 2016, using cells taken from the hip of his mother, Tina Boileau. That transplant failed; while waiting for another one he was visited by the Ottawa Senators, who came to his hospital after arriving in the Twin Cities to play the Minnesota Wild in an NHL game.

Pitre died of complications from septic shock on April 4, 2018, in Minneapolis. An outpouring of support was received from Prime Minister Justin Trudeau, Ontario Premier Kathleen Wynne, Mayor of Ottawa Jim Watson, the Ottawa Senators, and many others. The Ottawa Senators development camp named an award in his honour called the Jonathan Pitre Award, which is given out to the hardest-working players in the camp.

Jonathan Pitre Catholic Elementary School is named after him and opened its doors in Riverside South, Ontario in September 2020.

On December 7, 2020, the municipal council of Russell, Ontario approved to name an upcoming accessible park in honour of Jonathan Pitre, scheduled for completion in Fall 2021. On August 10, 2021, Francis Drouin announced that the federal government would be funding 70% of the park's construction costs.
