= Canadian House of Commons Standing Committee on Official Languages =

Standing committee of the House of Commons of Canada

The House of Commons Standing Committee on Official Languages (LANG) is a standing committee of the House of Commons of Canada.

== Mandate ==
- The review of official language policies and programs
- Review of reports of the Commissioner of Official Languages

== Membership ==
As of the 45th Canadian Parliament:

Party	Member	District
Liberal	Yvan Baker, chair	Etobicoke Centre, ON
Conservative	Joël Godin, vice chair	Portneuf—Jacques-Cartier, QC
Bloc Québécois	Mario Beaulieu, vice chair	La Pointe-de-l'Île, QC
Conservative	Jim Belanger	Sudbury East—Manitoulin—Nickel Belt, ON
Liberal	Madeleine Chenette	Thérèse-De Blainville, QC
Conservative	Marc Dalton	Pitt Meadows—Maple Ridge, BC
Liberal	Guillaume Deschênes-Thériault	Madawaska—Restigouche, NB
Conservative	Dalwinder Gill	Calgary McKnight, AB
Liberal	Giovanna Mingarelli	Prescott—Russell—Cumberland, ON
Liberal	Louis Villeneuve	Brome—Missisquoi, QC

== Subcommittees ==
- Subcommittee on Agenda and Procedure (SLAN)
