= Jean-Serge Brisson =

Canadian politician

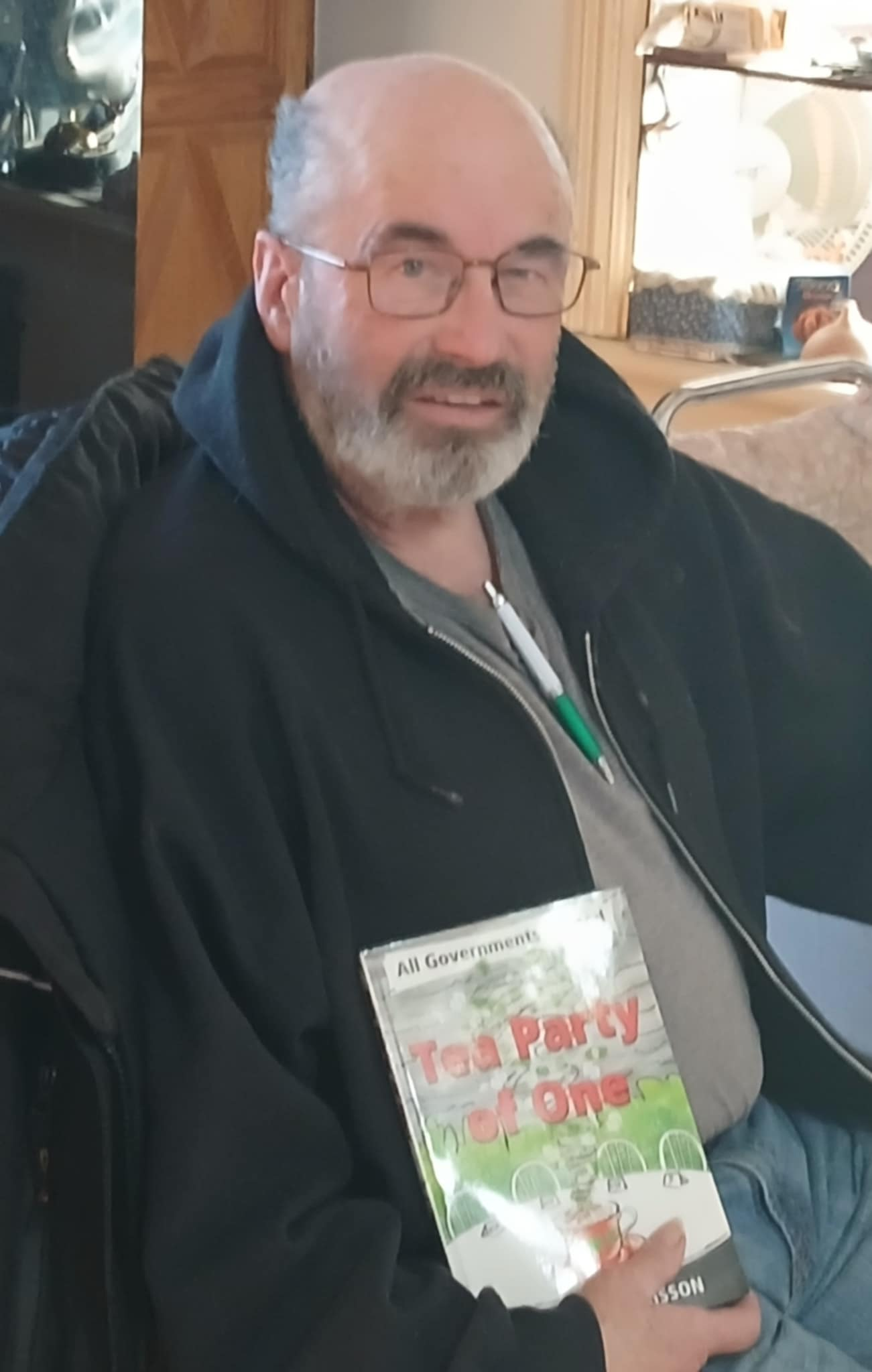
- Jean-Serge Brisson in 2025, with his English-language book Tea Party of One: All Governments Invited which was published in 2014.

14th leader of the Libertarian Party of Canada
- In office 1999 – May 18, 2008
- Preceded by: Robert Morse (interim)
- Succeeded by: Dennis Young

Personal details
- Born: June 28, 1954 (age 72) Embrun, Prescott and Russell
- Party: Libertarian
- Relations: Marc-Antoine Gagnier (nephew)

Jean-Serge Brisson (born June 28, 1954) is a Canadian political activist, tax reform advocate, politician, and author. He is a former leader of the Libertarian Party of Canada and gained national notoriety in the 1990s for his opposition to businesses being forced to collect the provincial sales tax (PST) without being remunerated.

== Early life ==
Brisson was born in Embrun, Ontario, a small village to the east of Ottawa and raised on a dairy farm.

Brisson describes his early experiences with jobs and bosses to have put him off from ever being able to work for a boss; instead, he wanted tostart his own business and be his own boss.

Brisson first apprenticed as a radiator technician. In 1974, he opened his own company in Embrun, Independent Radiator Co.

== Political life ==
=== Libertarian candidate ===
Brisson has been a candidate for the Libertarian Party of Canada and the Libertarian Party of Ontario in Glengarry-Prescott-Russell and Ottawa South. He has never been elected provincially or federally.

Despite being the leader of the Libertarian Party at the time, Brisson did not run in the 2004 federal election; this was due to his recent election to the municipal council in Russell, Ontario.

=== Leader of the Libertarian Party of Canada ===
Brisson was elected as the leader of the party in 1999 and served until May 18, 2008. Brisson credits himself with organizing the party to be able to re-register itself as an official party with Elections Canada and for running more candidates.

=== City Councillor ===
Following three unsuccessful attempts (including a narrow miss in 2000), Brisson was elected to the municipal council of Russell Township in November 2003 with 1,639 votes. As Councillor he opposed municipal legislation requiring all employees of local government to be proficient in both French and English. He was defeated in his bid for re-election on November 13, 2006 in the 2006 municipal election.

In the 2010 municipal election on October 25, 2010, he unsuccessfully sought election to city council again. With 1,045 votes, he placed ninth out of the nine candidates seeking the four council sets.

=== Opposition to PST collection ===
In the early 1990s, Brisson refused to continue collecting the Provincial Sales Tax (PST). He put forward the idea to the then New Democratic Party of Bob Rae, that collection of any money by small business for any government is slavery. Also the Progressive Conservatives of Brian Mulroney introduced the Goods and Sales Tax (GST) in Canada to replace the manufacturing sales tax.

Brisson argues that customers should be sending in their taxes to the Ontario government themselves, the Ontario government mandated that all businesses charge the sales tax when a customer was purchasing a good or service since 1961, then send that money to the government.

Brisson said he never agreed to be hired as a tax collector for the provincial government. However, if he was going to be doing their work, Brisson expected to be paid the same as other provincial tax collectors; at the time, Brisson's shop rate was approximately $30 per hour.

However, the government would not pay businesses for the added responsibilities to the business, which Brisson argued was a form of slavery. Brisson documented his experience in his book titled Tea Party of One: All Governments Invited.

In 1994, Brisson claims to have ceased filing income tax returns.

=== Electoral record (provincial and federal) ===
- 1988 Canadian federal election, Glengarry—Prescott—Russell, 335 votes (winner: Don Boudria, Liberal)
- 1990 Ontario general election, Prescott and Russell, 618 votes (winner: Jean Poirier, Liberal)
- 1993 Canadian federal election, Glengarry—Prescott—Russell, 244 votes (winner: Don Boudria, Liberal)
- 1995 Ontario general election, Prescott and Russell, 626 votes (winner: Jean-Marc Lalonde, Liberal)
- 2007 Ontario general election, Ottawa South, 384 votes (winner: Dalton McGuinty, Liberal)
- 2008 Canadian federal election, Ottawa South, 244 votes (winner: David McGuinty, Liberal)
- 2011 Canadian federal election, Glengarry—Prescott—Russell, 194 votes (winner: Pierre Lemieux, Conservative)
- 2011 Ontario general election, Ottawa South, 252 votes (winner: Dalton McGuinty, Liberal)
- 2013 Ontario by-election, Ottawa South, 208 votes (winner: John Fraser, Liberal)
- 2014 Ontario general election, Ottawa South, 273 votes (winner: John Fraser, Liberal)
- 2015 Canadian federal election, Glengarry—Prescott—Russell, 377 votes (winner: Francis Drouin, Liberal)
- 2018 Ontario general election, Carleton, 386 votes (winner: Goldie Ghamari, Progressive Conservative)
- 2020 Ontario by-election, Orléans, 177 votes (winner: Stephen Blais, Liberal)

=== Electoral record of councillors of Russell, 2010 ===
Rang	Councillors Candidate	Vote	%
1.	Érik Bazinet	2634	15
2.	Pierre Leroux	2547	14
3.	Craig Cullen	2322	13
4.	Jamie Laurin	2305	13
5.	Jim Cooper	2242	13
6.	Donald Saint-Pierre	1749	10
7.	Raymond Saint-Pierre	1278	7
8.	Jacques Aubé	1107	6
9.	Jean-Serge Brisson	1045	6

== Personal life ==
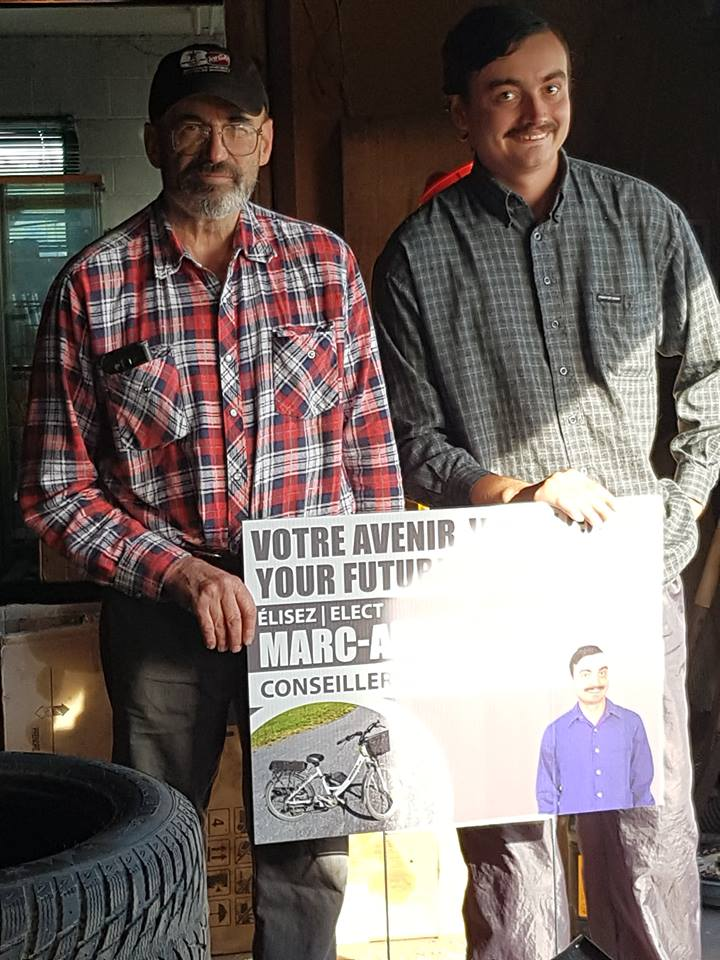
Jean-Serge Brisson with his nephew Marc-Antoine Gagnier for his sign to support him during the 2018 municipal election campaign

Brisson is a francophone and advocate for francophone rights. In 2012, his radiator repair shop came under fire for having a sign with its services listed only in French.

Brisson's nephew, Marc-Antoine Gagnier, was the author, radio host and three-time political candidate.
