= Stéphane Sarrazin (politician) =

Canadian politician

Stéphane Sarrazin MPP
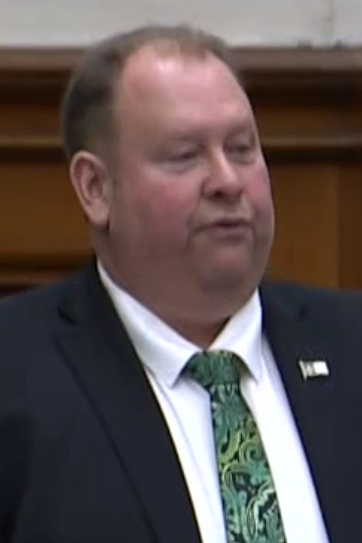
- Sarrazin in 2024

Member of the Ontario Provincial Parliament for Glengarry—Prescott—Russell
- Incumbent
- Assumed office June 2, 2022
- Preceded by: Amanda Simard

Mayor of Alfred and Plantagenet
- In office 2018–2022
- Preceded by: Fernand Dicaire
- Succeeded by: Yves Laviolette

Personal details
- Party: Progressive Conservative Party of Ontario

Stéphane Sarrazin MPP is a Canadian politician who was elected to the Legislative Assembly of Ontario in the 2022 provincial election. He represents the riding of Glengarry—Prescott—Russell as a member of the Progressive Conservative Party of Ontario.

Sarrazin was previously the mayor of Alfred and Plantagenet and the warden of Prescott and Russell United Counties.

As of March 28, 2024, Sarrazin became Parliamentary Assistant to the Associate Minister of Small Business and Parliamentary Assistant to the Minister of Francophone Affairs.

== Electoral history ==
2025 Ontario general election: Glengarry—Prescott—Russell
Party	Candidate	Votes	%	±%
Progressive Conservative	Stéphane Sarrazin	24,618	51.70	+9.65
Liberal	Trevor Stewart	17,752	37.28	–2.22
New Democratic	Ryder Finlay	2,384	5.01	–3.53
Green	Thaila Riden	1,089	2.29	–1.47
New Blue	Felix Labrosse	971	2.04	–2.30
Ontario Party	Brandon Wallingford	800	1.68	–0.14
Independent	Jason St-Louis	321	0.7	N/A
Total valid votes		47,835	99.27	+0.03
Total rejected, unmarked and declined ballots		352	0.73	–0.03
Turnout		48,187	48.72	+3.16
Eligible voters		98,903		
Progressive Conservative hold		Swing		+5.94
Source: Elections Ontario

2022 Ontario general election: Glengarry—Prescott—Russell
Party	Candidate	Votes	%	±%	Expenditures
Progressive Conservative	Stéphane Sarrazin	18,661	42.05	+1.07	$69,233
Liberal	Amanda Simard	17,529	39.50	+7.85	$51,459
New Democratic	Alicia Eglin	3,789	8.54	−13.25	$804
New Blue	Victor Brassard	1,924	4.34		$33,413
Green	Thaila Riden	1,670	3.76	+0.83	$1,098
Ontario Party	Stéphane Aubry	809	1.82	+0.27	$0
Total valid votes/expense limit		44,382	99.24	+0.56	$137,417
Total rejected, unmarked, and declined ballots		342	0.76	-0.56	
Turnout		44,724	45.56	-9.86	
Eligible voters		97,622			
Progressive Conservative gain from Liberal		Swing		−3.39	
Source(s): "Summary of Valid Votes Cast for Each Candidate" (PDF). Elections Ontario. 2022. Archived from the original on 2023-05-18.; "Statistical Summary by Electoral District" (PDF). Elections Ontario. 2022. Archived from the original on 2023-05-21.

Mayoral Candidate Alfred and Plantagenet	Vote	%
Stéphane Sarrazin	2,074	55.65
Jean-Pierre Cadieux	1,653	44.35
