= Grant Crack =

Canadian politician (born 1963)

Ontario MPP
- In office 2011–2018
- Preceded by: Jean-Marc Lalonde
- Succeeded by: Amanda Simard
- Constituency: Glengarry—Prescott—Russell

Personal details
- Born: April 2, 1963 (age 63) Quebec
- Party: Liberal
- Occupation: Auto dealership manager

Grant E. Crack (born April 2, 1963) is a former politician in Ontario, Canada. He was a Liberal member of the Legislative Assembly of Ontario from 2011 to 2018 who represented the rural Eastern Ontario riding of Glengarry—Prescott—Russell.

== Background ==
Crack was born in 1963 in Quebec and moved to Alexandria, Ontario, as a child. He attended Glengarry District High School in Alexandria, graduating in 1982. He then completed a college diploma and worked in the private sector before returning to Glengarry. He also worked full-time as a manager at the Husqvarna dealership in Alexandria. He is fluently bilingual in English and French, and his children attended French language schools in Glengarry.

== Politics ==
Crack served as mayor of North Glengarry, as well as mayor of the village of Alexandria in 1994 prior to the municipal amalgamation of North Glengarry, serving on council until his election as MPP.

He ran in the 2011 provincial election in the riding of Glengarry—Prescott—Russell. He defeated Progressive Conservative candidate Marilissa Gosselin by 1,372 votes. He was re-elected in the 2014 election defeating PC candidate and daughter of Noble Villeneuve, Roxane Villeneuve Robertson by 8,554 votes.

He is a Parliamentary Assistant to the Minister of Education.

Crack announced his retirement from provincial politics in April 2018, a few months before the next Ontario election.
