= Joseph Albert Bélanger =

Canadian politician

Joseph Bélanger

Ontario MPP
- In office 1967–1981
- Preceded by: New riding
- Succeeded by: Don Boudria
- Constituency: Prescott and Russell

Personal details
- Born: October 22, 1922 Hammond, Ontario
- Died: March 13, 2005 (aged 82)
- Party: Progressive Conservative
- Spouse: Rollande Saumure Angeline Legault
- Occupation: Cheese producer

Joseph Albert Bélanger (October 22, 1922 - March 13, 2005) was an Ontario dairy farmer and political figure. He represented Prescott and Russell in the Legislative Assembly of Ontario from 1967 to 1981 as a Progressive Conservative member.

He was born in Hammond, Ontario, the son of Sylvio Bélanger and Mériza Gélineau. In 1942, he married Rollande Saumure (d.1969) and then married Angeline Legault in 1972. He was a cheese producer and served as director of the Ontario Dairy Producers Council. Bélanger served as deputy government whip in 1976. He lived in Sarsfield and was a member of the Knights of Columbus.
