= 2010 Prescott and Russell United Counties municipal elections =

Elections were held in Prescott and Russell United Counties, Ontario on October 25, 2010 in conjunction with municipal elections across the province.

== Prescott and Russell United Counties Council ==
The Council consists of the mayors of the eight constituent municipalities:

Municipality	Mayor
Alfred and Plantagenet	Jean-Yves Lalonde
Casselman	Claude Levac
Champlain	Gary J. Barton
Clarence-Rockland	Marcel Guibord
East Hawkesbury	Robert Kirby
Hawkesbury	René Berthiaume
Russell	Jean-Paul Saint-Pierre
The Nation	François St. Amour

== Alfred and Plantagenet ==
Mayoral Candidate	Vote	%
Jean-Yves Lalonde (X)	Acclaimed	

== Casselman ==
=== Mayor ===
Rang	Mayoral Candidate	Vote	%
1.	Claude Levac	701	39
2.	Conrad Lamadeleine (X)	675	38
3.	Daniel Lafleur	406	23

=== Councillors ===
Rang	Councillors Candidate	Vote	%
1.	Mario Laplante	1373	24
2.	Francyn Leblanc	1239	22
3.	Marcel Cléroux	1149	20
4.	Michel Desjardins	1070	19
5.	Jean-Sébastien Caron	824	15

== Champlain ==
Mayoral Candidate	Vote	%
Gary J. Barton (X)	Acclaimed	

== Clarence-Rockland ==
Mayoral Candidate	Vote	%
Marcel Guibord	4573	51
Pierre Charron (X)	3951	44
Réjean Mathurin	469	5

== East Hawkesbury ==
=== Mayor ===
Mayoral Candidate	Vote	%
Robert Kirby (X)	Acclaimed	

=== Deputy Mayor ===
Deputy Mayoral Candidate	Vote	%
Richard Sauvé (X)	Acclaimed	

=== Councillors ===
Rang	Councillors Candidate	Vote	%
1.	Gabriel Dussault	Acclaimed	
2.	Luc Lalonde	Acclaimed	
3.	Linda Séguin	Acclaimed	

== Hawkesbury ==
=== Mayor ===
Mayoral Candidate	Vote	%
René Berthiaume	3068	59
Jeanne Charlebois (X)	2110	41

=== Councillors ===
Rang	Councillors Candidate	Vote	%
1.	Johanne Portelance	2864	11
2.	André Chamaillard	2655	11
3.	Michel Thibodeau	2642	11
4.	Michel Beaulne	2439	10
5.	Alain Fraser	2168	9
6.	Marc Tourangeau	1991	8
7.	Bonnie Jean-Louis	1883	7
8.	André Pilon	1648	7
9.	Gilles Roch Greffe	1639	7
10.	Sylvain Dubé	1607	6
11.	Gilbert Cyr	1558	6
12.	Jean Bryant Corbin	1154	5
13.	Frederick Miner	859	3

== Russell ==
=== Mayor ===
Rang	Mayoral Candidate	Vote	%
1.	Jean-Paul Saint-Pierre	3,036	56
2.	Lorraine Dicaire	1,559	29
3.	Ken Hill (X)	426	8
4.	Ron Barr	422	8

=== Councillors ===
Rang	Councillors Candidate	Vote	%
1.	Érik Bazinet	2634	15
2.	Pierre Leroux	2547	14
3.	Craig Cullen	2322	13
4.	Jamie Laurin	2305	13
5.	Jim Cooper	2242	13
6.	Donald Saint-Pierre	1749	10
7.	Raymond Saint-Pierre	1278	7
8.	Jacques Aubé	1107	6
9.	Jean-Serge Brisson	1045	6

== The Nation ==
Mayoral Candidate	Vote	%
François St. Amour	Acclaimed	
