= Jean-Marc Lalonde =

Canadian politician

Ontario MPP
- In office 1999–2011
- Preceded by: New riding
- Succeeded by: Grant Crack
- Constituency: Glengarry-Prescott-Russell
- In office 1995–1999
- Preceded by: Jean Poirier
- Succeeded by: Riding abolished
- Constituency: Prescott and Russell

Personal details
- Born: August 19, 1935 (age 89); Prescott and Russell
- Political party: Liberal
- Occupation: Civil servant

Jean-Marc Lalonde CM (born August 19, 1935) is a politician in Ontario, Canada. He was a Liberal member of the Legislative Assembly of Ontario from 1995 to 2011 who represented the riding of Glengarry-Prescott-Russell. He was mayor of Rockland, Ontario from 1976 to 1991 and was elected as a municipal councillor in 2014.

== Background ==
Lalonde was born in the county of Prescott and Russell on August 19, 1935. He was employed in the Public Service of Canada from 1956 to 1990. He served for a time as the manager of the Canadian Government Printing Bureau, and was responsible for the establishment and operation of technical training and development for the Canada Communications Group. Outside of public service, Lalonde was a co-owner of the Hull Olympiques ice hockey team in the Quebec Major Junior Hockey League for several years, and was a director of the Canadian Amateur Hockey Association from 1972 to 1976.

== Politics ==
He was mayor of Rockland, Ontario from 1976 to 1991. For eleven years, Lalonde was a director of the Association of Municipalities of Ontario, and was also the vice-president of the Francophone Association of Municipalities of Ontario for a time.

Lalonde was elected to the Ontario legislature in the 1995 provincial election, in the riding of Prescott and Russell in the easternmost section of the province. The Progressive Conservatives won the election, and Lalonde joined 29 other Liberals in the official opposition. He was re-elected without difficulty in the new riding of Glengarry-Prescott-Russell in the general election of 1999.

The Liberals won the 2003 election, in which Lalonde defeated his closest opponent by almost 20,000 votes. Lalonde served as the Parliamentary Assistant for the Minister of Health Promotion. Prior to that, he has also worked as Parliamentary Assistant to the Minister of Economic Development and Trade, as Parliamentary Assistant to the Minister of Small Business and Entrepreneurship, Parliamentary Assistant to the Minister of Transportation and Chair of the Small Business Agency of Ontario.

In the 2007 election, Lalonde was re-elected in his riding by a commanding margin over PC candidate Dennis Pommainville.

On April 13, 2011, Lalonde announced that he would not run in the 2011 election.

In 2014, he returned to politics as a municipal councillor in the town of Clarence-Rockland.

== After politics ==
Lalonde was appointed as a Member of the Order of Canada for his contributions in public service and promoting bilingualism services in both English and French in Ontario.

== Electoral record ==
2007 Ontario general election
Party	Candidate	Votes	%	±%
Liberal	Jean-Marc Lalonde	24,525	60.5	-5.47
Progressive Conservative	Denis Pommainville	11,018	27.2	+2.32
Green	Karolyne Pickett	2,348	5.8	+2.45
New Democratic	Josée Blanchette	2,301	5.7	-0.1
Family Coalition	Vicki Gunn	339	0.8	N/A

2003 Ontario general election
Party	Candidate	Votes	%	±%
Liberal	Jean-Marc Lalonde	28,956	65.97	+10.59
Progressive Conservative	Albert Bourdeau	10,921	24.88	-14.26
New Democratic	Guy Belle-isle	2,544	5.8	+1.28
Green	Louise Pattington	1,471	3.35	

1999 Ontario general election
Party	Candidate	Votes	%	±%
Liberal	Jean-Marc Lalonde	24,568	55.38	
Progressive Conservative	Alain Lalonde	17,364	39.14	
New Democratic	Stéphane Landry	2,007	4.52	
Natural Law	Mary Glasser	425	0.96	

1995 Ontario general election
Party	Candidate	Votes	%	±%
Liberal	Jean-Marc Lalonde	24,808	55.7	-9.3%
Progressive Conservative	Pierre Leduc	13,637	30.6	+23.5%
New Democratic	Yves Deschamps	4,472	10.0	-13.5%
Libertarian	Jean-Serge Brisson	626	1.4	-0.2%
Independent	John MacKinnon	564	1.3	
Natural Law	Pierrette Blondin	446	1.0	
