= Don Boudria =

Canadian politician (born 1949)

The Honourable Don Boudria PC
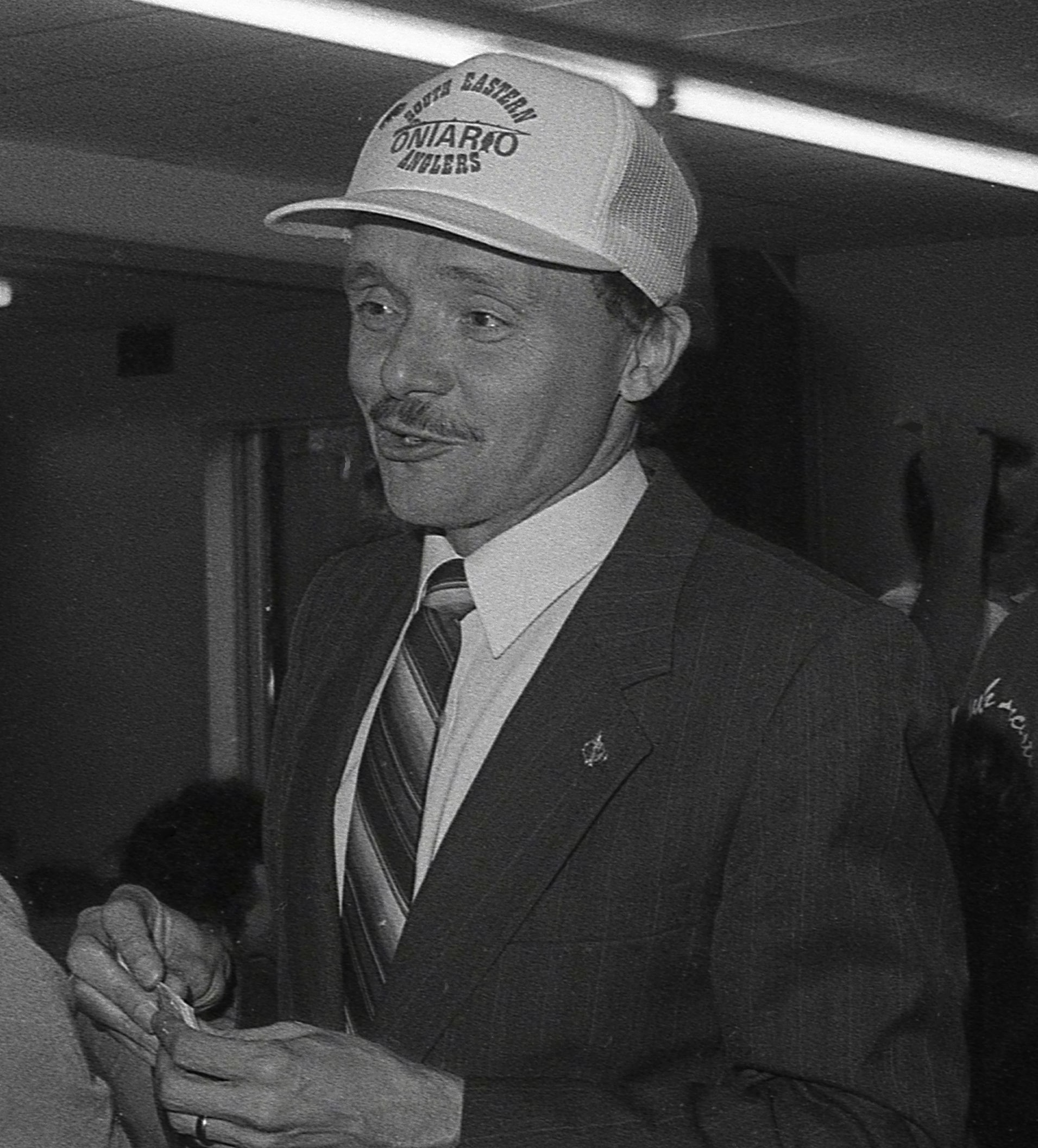

Minister for International Cooperation
- In office 1996–1997
- Preceded by: Pierre Pettigrew
- Succeeded by: Diane Marleau

Minister responsible for La Francophonie
- In office October 3, 1996 – June 10, 1997
- Prime Minister: Jean Chrétien
- Preceded by: Pierre Pettigrew
- Succeeded by: Diane Marleau

Minister of State and Leader of the Government in the House of Commons
- In office June 11, 1997 – January 14, 2002
- Preceded by: Herb Gray
- Succeeded by: Ralph Goodale

Minister of Public Works and Government Services
- In office May 6, 2002 – May 26, 2002
- Preceded by: Ralph Goodale
- Succeeded by: Jacques Saada
- In office January 15, 2002 – May 5, 2002
- Preceded by: Alfonso Gagliano
- Succeeded by: Ralph Goodale

Member of Parliament for Glengarry–Prescott–Russell
- In office September 4, 1984 – January 22, 2006
- Preceded by: Denis Éthier
- Succeeded by: Pierre Lemieux

Ontario MPP
- In office 1981–1984
- Preceded by: Joseph Albert Bélanger
- Succeeded by: Jean Poirier
- Constituency: Prescott and Russell

Personal details
- Born: August 30, 1949 (age 76) Hull, Quebec, Canada
- Party: Liberal

Don Boudria PC (born August 30, 1949) is a Canadian former politician and current senior associate at Sandstone Group, an Ottawa-based executive advisory firm. He served in the House of Commons of Canada from 1984 to 2006 as a member of the Liberal Party of Canada, and was a cabinet minister in the government of Jean Chrétien.

== Municipal and provincial politics ==
Boudria was born in Hull, Quebec, and raised in Sarsfield, Ontario. Similarly, he was educated in the area and worked as a public servant before entering political life. A Franco-Ontarian, he was elected as councillor for Cumberland Township in 1976, and remained a council member until his election to the Legislative Assembly of Ontario in the 1981 provincial election. Boudria defeated Progressive Conservative incumbent Joseph Albert Bélanger by 5,172 votes in Prescott and Russell, and served in the legislature for three years as a member the Ontario Liberal Party, which was then the official opposition to the Progressive Conservative government, led by William Davis.

== Entry into federal politics ==
He left provincial politics to run for the House of Commons in the 1984 federal election. Boudria won a convincing victory in Ontario's easternmost riding, Glengarry—Prescott—Russell, even as his party suffered a landslide defeat against Brian Mulroney's Progressive Conservatives. Joining the opposition benches of the Commons in 1984, he became a member of the Liberal Rat Pack with Brian Tobin, Sheila Copps and John Nunziata. This group of young Liberals made it their business to challenge the Tories at every possible chance. In his first federal term, Boudria successfully sponsored a motion to erect a statue of Canada's only Nobel Peace Prize-winning prime minister, the Right Honourable Lester B. Pearson.

== Re-election and cabinet positions ==
Boudria was re-elected without difficulty in 1988, 1993, 1997 and 2000. Like the other Rat Pack members, he rose rapidly in the Liberal ranks. From 1991 to 1993, he served as Deputy Liberal House Leader. After the Liberals won a huge majority in 1993, Boudria returned temporarily to the back benches. He was appointed Chief Government Whip on September 15, 1994. He held this position until October 4, 1996, when he was named to Cabinet as Minister for International Cooperation and Minister responsible for La Francophonie.

Boudria was named Minister of State and Leader of the Government in the House of Commons after the 1997 election, managing a complex legislative agenda when, for the first time in Canadian history, five parties (Liberals, Reform, Bloc Québécois, New Democrats and Progressive Conservatives, in descending order of seat count) won enough seats to qualify for official party status. In 1998, he sponsored legislation to control third-party advertising during election campaigns strictly. This law was challenged all the way to the Supreme Court and sustained, remaining in place to this day. One of the main challengers of this legislation was the National Citizens Coalition.

He retained this position until January 14, 2002, when he was again given a full portfolio as Minister of Public Works and Government Services. He was reappointed as Minister of State and Leader of the Government in the House of Commons on May 26, 2002, when Prime Minister Jean Chrétien retired.

=== Chrétien loyalist ===
Boudria was known within the Liberal caucus as a leading Chrétien loyalist. During Question Period, he frequently handed Chrétien notes from a white binder. Due to this practice, Reform Party deputy leader Deb Grey asked in 2000 if Chrétien could answer a question "without any help from Binder Boy." The nickname stuck.

Boudria was not reappointed to cabinet in December 2003 when Paul Martin replaced Chrétien as Liberal leader and prime minister. However, he became chair of the Official Languages Committee, and after the 2004 federal election, became chair of the Procedure and House Affairs Committee. Subsequently, he was elected chair of the Standing Committee on Official Languages (3rd session of the 37th parliament) and the Standing Committee on Procedure and House Affairs (1st session of the 38th parliament).

On May 6, 2005, Boudria announced he would not run in the next election.

== Life after government ==
Boudria's memoir, Busboy: From Kitchen to Cabinet, was published in late 2005. In 2006, he assisted Stéphane Dion's campaign for the leadership of the Liberal Party. Boudria joined Ottawa-based public relations agency Hill & Knowlton Canada as a senior associate in May 2006, and was promoted to senior counsellor in March 2007. He continued with Hill & Knowlton Canada up until June 2023, before beginning a new professional journey as senior associate at Sandstone Group.

Don's son, Dan Boudria, was elected to the Conseil des écoles catholiques de langue française du Centre-Est in the 2006 municipal election. In early 2007, the Liberal Party of Canada Association of Glengarry—Prescott—Russell selected the younger Boudria as candidate in the 40th federal election. He lost to incumbent Conservative MP Pierre Lemieux.

== Accolades ==
Boudria has been decorated on three separate occasions by the International Assembly of French-speaking Parliamentarians with the l’Ordre de la Pleiade award, where he served as the founding president of the Ontario section, for his advocacy of international cooperation and the rights of French-speaking peoples. He was also a recipient of the Canadian Association of Former Parliamentarians' Distinguished Service Award in 2018.

The University of Ottawa has created an annual scholarship under his name to nurture Canadian history scholars.

The city of Ottawa has also established a Don Boudria Park in Orleans to recognize his many years of service to the region and to Canadians at large. It was opened in July 2020 and officially inaugurated by Jim Watson, the Mayor of Ottawa, in August 2021.

== Electoral record ==
2004 Canadian federal election
Party	Candidate	Votes	%	±%
Liberal	Don Boudria	23,921	47.9%	−20.1%
Conservative	Alain Lalonde	18,729	37.5%	+10.2%
New Democratic	Martin Cauvier	4,238	8.5%	+4.4%
Green	Roy Fjarlie	2,634	5.3%	
Christian Heritage	Tim Bloedow	464	0.9%	
Total valid votes		49,986	100.0%	

Note: Conservative vote is compared to the total of the Canadian Alliance vote and Progressive Conservative vote in 2000 election.

2000 Canadian federal election
Party	Candidate	Votes	%	±%
Liberal	Don Boudria	31,371	68.0%	−4.0%
Alliance	L. Sebastian Anders	8,632	18.7%	+9.2%
Progressive Conservative	Ashley O'Kurley	3,942	8.5%	−4.0%
New Democratic	Guy Belle-Isle	1,877	4.1%	−0.6%
Natural Law	Wayne Foster	334	0.7%	+0.3%
Total valid votes		46,156	100.0%	

Note: Canadian Alliance vote is compared to the Reform vote in 1997 election.

1997 Canadian federal election: Glengarry—Prescott—Russell
Party	Candidate	Votes	%	±%	Expenditures
Liberal	Don Boudria	34,986	71.98	−8.23	$ 46,386
Progressive Conservative	France Somers	6,109	12.57	+4.38	10,057
Reform	Mike Lancop	4,599	9.46	+1.48	2,386
New Democratic	Fred Cappuccino	2,289	4.71	+2.37	11,524
Green	Richard Kerr	417	0.86		499
Natural Law	Mary Glasser	207	0.43	−0.42	0
Total valid votes/expense limit		48,607	100.00	−12.93	$ 62,182
Total rejected ballots		598	1.22		
Turnout		49,205	68.68		
Electors on the lists		71,639			
Sources: Elections Canada Official Voting Results and Financial Returns

1993 Canadian federal election
Party	Candidate	Votes	%	±%
Liberal	Don Boudria	44,775	80.2%	+9.5%
Progressive Conservative	France Somers	4,572	8.2%	−10.9%
Reform	Sam McCracken	4,456	8.0%	
New Democratic	Pascal Villeneuve	1,304	2.3%	−6.8%
Natural Law	Pierrette Blondin	473	0.8%	
Libertarian	Jean-Serge Brisson	244	0.4%	−0.2%
Total valid votes		55,824	100.0%	

1988 Canadian federal election
Party	Candidate	Votes	%	±%
Liberal	Don Boudria	35,280	70.7%	+17.6%
Progressive Conservative	Roger R. Presseault	9,517	19.1%	−13.9%
New Democratic	Helena McCuaig	4,537	9.1%	−4.8%
Libertarian	Jean-Serge Brisson	335	0.7%	
Commonwealth of Canada	John Feres	199	0.4%	
Total valid votes		49,868	100.0%	

1984 Canadian federal election
Party	Candidate	Votes	%	±%
Liberal	Don Boudria	26,057	53.1%	−15.4%
Progressive Conservative	John Stante	16,170	33.0%	+13.3%
New Democratic	Annemarie Collard	6,838	13.9%	+13.7%
Total valid votes		49,065	100.0%	

== See also ==
- List of University of Waterloo people

26th Canadian Ministry (1993–2003) – Cabinet of Jean Chrétien
Cabinet posts (4)
Predecessor	Office	Successor
	Minister of State; 2002–2003 (NB: no portfolio specified - while House Leader)	
Alfonso Gagliano	Minister of Public Works and Government Services; 2002	Ralph Goodale
	Minister of State; 1997–2002 (NB: no portfolio specified - while House Leader)	
Pierre Pettigrew	Minister for International Cooperation; 1996–1997	Diane Marleau
Special Cabinet Responsibilities
Predecessor	Title	Successor
Pierre Pettigrew	Minister responsible for La Francophonie; 1996–1997	Diane Marleau
Special Parliamentary Responsibilities
Predecessor	Title	Successor
Ralph Goodale	Leader of the Government in the House of Commons; 2002–2003 second time	Jacques Saada
Herb Gray	Leader of the Government in the House of Commons; 1997–2002 first time	Ralph Goodale
