= Pierre Lemieux =

Canadian politician

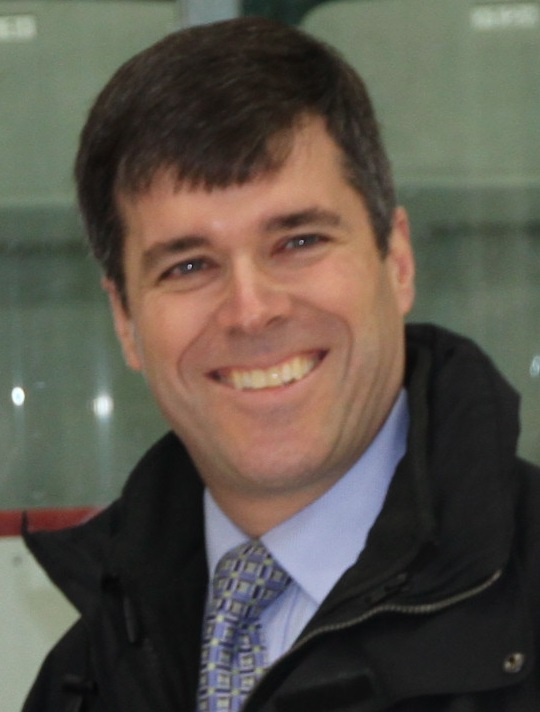

Member of Parliament for Glengarry—Prescott—Russell
- In office January 23, 2006 – August 4, 2015
- Preceded by: Don Boudria
- Succeeded by: Francis Drouin

Personal details
- Born: April 9, 1963 (age 63) Embrun, Ontario, Canada
- Party: Conservative
- Spouse: Audrey Lemieux
- Profession: Consultant, mechanical engineer

Military service
- Allegiance: Canada
- Branch/service: Canadian Armed Forces
- Rank: Lieutenant-Colonel

Pierre Lemieux (born April 9, 1963) is a politician in Ontario, Canada. He served as the Member of Parliament for the riding of Glengarry-Prescott-Russell from 2006 to 2015, first elected in Canada's 39th general election and defeated in the 42nd. He represented the Conservative Party of Canada. While in office he served as deputy government whip as well as parliamentary secretary to the Ministers of Official Languages, Agriculture, and Veterans Affairs. He was a candidate for the leadership of the Conservative Party of Canada in 2017.

== Background ==
Lemieux was born in Embrun, Ontario. He has a Bachelor of Mechanical Engineering and a Master's of Science from the Royal Military College of Canada. He has been a Professional Engineer since 1994.

Lemieux served in the Canadian Forces for 20 years and retired at the rank of lieutenant-colonel. He then worked for a number of years in the Ottawa high tech sector, most notably for JDS Uniphase. He then started his own company, offering project management and consulting services to government departments and charitable organizations.

== Politics ==
=== Party leadership bid ===
In August 2016, Lemieux declared his candidacy for the 2017 Conservative Party of Canada leadership election. Lemieux's campaign manager was Steve Outhouse, a former Parliament Hill staffer.

His campaign generally focused on social conservative issues and increased personal liberties, including reducing the size and influence of government. This included a proposed review of firearms laws, term limits and Parliamentary votes for Supreme Court judges, and opposition to a carbon tax. He also favours increased government powers for face-to-face immigration screening to combat "Radical Islamic Terrorism", though opposes a controversial "Canadian values" screening test proposed by another Conservative leadership candidate, Kellie Leitch, on the grounds that "terrorists won’t share their true values with [Canada's] immigration officials".

In line with many other Conservative Party leadership contenders, Lemieux has stated that he strongly supports Israel and its right to self-defence.

Lemieux has been critical of other conservative politicians in Canada that he believes are helping make the country more liberal through their support of socially liberal legislative initiatives such as private member's Bill C-309, which seeks to establish a gender awareness week. Lemieux has stated that he believes such moves make these politicians "liberal-light" rather than conservative and has called on social conservatives to "not be taken for granted" by more liberal elements of federal and provincial conservative parties.

His policies have been supported by the anti-abortion advocacy group Campaign Life Coalition as well as University of Toronto Professor Jordan Peterson.

=== Social views: abortion, marriage, conscience rights ===
Lemieux has stated that he personally believes in the "inherent dignity of human life from the moment of conception through to natural death...we need to discuss and debate life issues in an open and respectful way, both within society and within Parliament." He has also stated that he personally believes in the traditional definition of marriage as the union between one man and one woman.

In his leadership campaign, Lemieux committed to end sex-selective abortion and divert funds that support international abortion services to Canada's military with a mind to meeting Canada's NATO commitments on defence spending. He has also been a proponent of protecting medical conscience rights particularly during considerations of physician assisted suicide.

Campaign Life Coalition, a pro-life advocacy group, rated Lemieux as a "pro-life, pro-family" Member of Parliament. During his time as a Member of Parliament he voted in favour of Stephen Woodworth's M‑312, which sought to create a Parliamentary Committee that would study whether a child in the womb is a human being. He also voted against Bill C-279 (known as the "Bathroom Bill"), which would have allowed transgender individuals to use washrooms based on their gender identity. He also spoke and voted in favour of Mark Warawa's M-408, which asked that Parliament ban sex-selective abortions.

=== Free speech & expression ===
Lemieux has been a vocal critic of restrictions on freedom of speech and expression. He opposes federal legislation that proposes to add "gender expression" and "gender identity" as defining factors for discrimination in the Criminal Code and Canadian Human Rights Act on the grounds that it negatively impacts free speech. Such negative impacts were claimed as including the forced use of gender neutral pronouns when addressing members of the LGBT community, for which some in that community have noted their opposition to his campaign. He has also proposed to empower Parliament to review all speech laws to ensure they properly balance freedom of speech and reasonable limits. These stances have gained the support of controversial University of Toronto Professor Jordan Peterson, whom he has met on a number of occasions.

He has also voiced strong opposition to M-103, a Parliamentary Motion of Liberal Member of Parliament Iqra Khalid, which condemns religious discrimination and makes particular note of Islamophobia in its preposition.

=== Electoral history ===
Lemieux was first elected in the 2006 Canadian federal election that brought Stephen Harper's Conservatives into Government. Lemieux narrowly defeated Liberal René Berthiaume, becoming the Conservative MP for Glengarry—Prescott—Russell. It had been one of the longest held Liberal ridings in Eastern Ontario. Lemieux improved his election results with larger margins of victory in 2008 and 2011. In 2015, Lemieux was defeated by Liberal Francis Drouin by over 10,000 votes, in an election that replaced Stephen Harper's Conservative government with Justin Trudeau's Liberals.

Lemieux ran again in the 2019 Canadian federal election but was defeated, again by Francis Drouin, though by a smaller vote margin than in 2015.

Lemieux attempted to run again in the 2021 Canadian Federal Election. However, citing policy that a candidate who loses twice is ineligible to run again, Lemieux candidacy was blocked by the Conservative party.

== Electoral record ==
2019 Canadian federal election: Glengarry—Prescott—Russell
Party	Candidate	Votes	%	±%	Expenditures
Liberal	Francis Drouin	31,293	47.56	-5.71	$82,180.98
Conservative	Pierre Lemieux	23,660	35.96	-0.45	$112,830.16
New Democratic	Konstantine Malakos	6,851	10.41	+2.49	$3,975.49
Green	Marthe Lépine †	2,113	3.21	+1.41	none listed
People's	Jean-Jacques Desgranges	1,174	1.78		none listed
Libertarian	Darcy Neal Donnelly	262	0.40	-0.19	none listed
Independent	Daniel John Fey	239	0.36		$4,778.11
Rhinoceros	Marc-Antoine Gagnier	199	0.30		none listed
Total valid votes/expense limit		65,791	99.03		
Total rejected ballots		645	0.97	+0.35	
Turnout		66,436	71.78	-3.29	
Eligible voters		92,555			
Liberal hold		Swing		-2.63	
Source: Elections Canada † The Green Party of Canada dropped Marthe Lépine for her anti-abortion views; she ran as an independent instead.

2015 Canadian federal election
Party	Candidate	Votes	%	±%	Expenditures
Liberal	Francis Drouin	34,189	53.28	+22.68	$114,201.86
Conservative	Pierre Lemieux	23,367	36.41	-12.40	$131,909.88
New Democratic	Normand Laurin	5,087	7.93	-8.74	$4,769.31
Green	Genevieve Malouin-Diraddo	1,153	1.80	-1.78	$156.86
Libertarian	Jean-Serge Brisson	377	0.59	+0.25	–
Total valid votes/Expense limit		64,173	100.00		$223,399.99
Total rejected ballots		399	0.62	–	
Turnout		64,572	75.62	–	
Eligible voters		85,388			
Liberal gain from Conservative		Swing		+17.54	
Source: Elections Canada

2011 Canadian federal election
Party	Candidate	Votes	%	±%	Expenditures
Conservative	Pierre Lemieux	28,174	48.80	+1.50	–
Liberal	Julie Bourgeois	17,705	30.67	-6.19	–
New Democratic	Denis Séguin	9,608	16.64	+6.18	–
Green	Sylvie Lemieux	2,049	3.55	-1.81	–
Libertarian	Jean-Serge Brisson	194	0.34	–	–
Total valid votes/Expense limit		57,730	100.00		–
Total rejected ballots		304	0.52	–	
Turnout		58,034	68.80	–	
Eligible voters		84,347	–	–	

2008 Canadian federal election
Party	Candidate	Votes	%	±%	Expenditures
Conservative	Pierre Lemieux	25,659	47.30	+5.75	$80,105
Liberal	Dan Boudria	19,997	36.86	-4.33	$71,845
New Democratic	Jean-Sébastien Caron	5,674	10.46	-2.28	$2,043
Green	Sylvie Lemieux	2,908	5.36	+0.86	$5,306
Total valid votes/Expense limit		54,238	100.00		$85,679

2006 Canadian federal election
Party	Candidate	Votes	%	±%
Conservative	Pierre Lemieux	22,990	41.55	+4.1
Liberal	René Berthiaume	22,787	41.19	-6.7
New Democratic	Jo-Ann Fennessey	7,049	12.74	+4.3
Green	Bonnie Jean-Louis	2,494	4.50	-0.8
Total valid votes		55,320	100.0	
