= Prescott and Russell (provincial electoral district) =

Former provincial electoral district in Ontario, Canada

Ontario electoral district

Defunct provincial electoral district
- Legislature: Legislative Assembly of Ontario
- District created: 1966
- District abolished: 1996
- First contested: 1967
- Last contested: 1995

Prescott and Russell was a provincial electoral district in Ontario, Canada. It existed from 1967 to 1999, when it was abolished into Glengarry—Prescott—Russell and Ottawa—Orléans when ridings were redistributed to match their federal counterparts. It consisted of the United Counties of Prescott and Russell as well as the Township of Cumberland.

== Members of Provincial Parliament ==
Prescott and Russell
Assembly	Years	Member	Party
Prescott merged with Russell before the 1967 election
28th	1967–1971	Joseph Albert Bélanger	Progressive Conservative
29th	1971–1975	Joseph Albert Bélanger	Progressive Conservative
30th	1975–1977	Joseph Albert Bélanger	Progressive Conservative
31st	1977–1981	Joseph Albert Bélanger	Progressive Conservative
32nd	1981–1984	Don Boudria	Liberal
32nd	1984–1985	Jean Poirier	Liberal
33rd	1985–1987	Jean Poirier	Liberal
34th	1987–1990	Jean Poirier	Liberal
35th	1990–1995	Jean Poirier	Liberal
36th	1995–1999	Jean-Marc Lalonde	Liberal
Sourced from the Ontario Legislative Assembly
Redistributed into Glengarry—Prescott—Russell and Ottawa—Orléans before the 1999 election

== Election results ==
1995 Ontario general election
Party	Candidate	Votes	%	±%
Liberal	Jean-Marc Lalonde	24,808	55.68	–9.29
Progressive Conservative	Pierre Leduc	13,637	30.61	+23.46
New Democratic	Yves Deschamps	4,472	10.04	–13.48
Libertarian	Jean-Serge Brisson	626	1.41	–0.15
Independent	John MacKinnon	564	1.27	–
Natural Law	Pierrette Blondin	446	1.00	–
Total valid votes		44,553	98.86	
Total rejected, unmarked and declined ballots		515	1.14	–0.11
Turnout		45,068	56.64	–2.64
Eligible voters		79,574		
Liberal hold		Swing		–16.37
Source: Elections Ontario

1990 Ontario general election
Party	Candidate	Votes	%	±%
Liberal	Jean Poirier	25,879	64.97	–10.83
New Democratic	Carole Roy	9,369	23.52	+10.91
Progressive Conservative	Keith Flavell	2,848	7.15	–4.44
Family Coalition	Paul Lauzon	1,119	2.81	–
Libertarian	Jean-Serge Brisson	618	1.55	–
Total valid votes		39,833	98.75	
Total rejected, unmarked and declined ballots		504	1.25	+0.70
Turnout		40,337	59.27	–0.73
Eligible voters		68,054		
Liberal hold		Swing		–10.87
Source: Elections Ontario

1987 Ontario general election
Party	Candidate	Votes	%	±%
Liberal	Jean Poirier	26,811	75.80	+17.84
New Democratic	Yves Deschamps	4,460	12.61	+4.53
Progressive Conservative	Roland Demers	4,100	11.59	–22.38
Total valid votes		35,371	99.45	
Total rejected ballots		195	0.55	+0.18
Turnout		35,566	60.00	–0.23
Eligible voters		59,276		
Liberal hold		Swing		+6.66
Source: Elections Ontario

1985 Ontario general election
Party	Candidate	Votes	%	±%
Liberal	Jean Poirier	18,833	57.95	+7.85
Progressive Conservative	Guy Genier	11,038	33.97	–7.11
New Democratic	Maurice Landry	2,625	8.08	–0.74
Total valid votes		32,496	99.63	
Total rejected ballots		121	0.37	–0.05
Turnout		32,617	60.23	+22.17
Eligible voters		54,150		
Liberal hold		Swing		+7.48
Source: Elections Ontario

Ontario provincial by-election, December 13, 1984 Resignation of Don Boudria to run in the federal election
Party	Candidate	Votes	%	±%
Liberal	Jean Poirier	10,182	50.11	–6.11
Progressive Conservative	Gaston Patenaude	8,347	41.08	+4.09
New Democratic	Rheo Lalonde	1,791	8.81	+2.02
Total valid votes		20,320	99.58	
Total rejected ballots		85	0.42	–0.09
Turnout		20,405	38.07	–22.71
Eligible voters		53,602		
Liberal hold		Swing		–5.10
Source: Elections Ontario

1981 Ontario general election
Party	Candidate	Votes	%	±%
Liberal	Don Boudria	15,123	56.22	+19.74
Progressive Conservative	Joseph Albert Bélanger	9,951	36.99	–11.75
New Democratic	Claude Dion	1,828	6.80	–7.98
Total valid votes		26,902	99.49	
Total rejected ballots		137	0.51	+0.10
Turnout		27,039	60.78	–1.70
Eligible voters		44,490		
Liberal gain from Progressive Conservative		Swing		+15.75
Source: Elections Ontario

1977 Ontario general election
Party	Candidate	Votes	%	±%
Progressive Conservative	Joseph Albert Bélanger	11,863	48.74	+4.81
Liberal	Philibert Proulx	8,877	36.48	+0.71
New Democratic	Joseph Ernest Cheff	3,597	14.78	–5.52
Total valid votes		24,337	99.59	
Total rejected ballots		99	0.41	–0.06
Turnout		24,436	62.48	–6.28
Eligible voters		39,111		
Progressive Conservative hold		Swing		+2.05
Source: Elections Ontario

1975 Ontario general election
Party	Candidate	Votes	%	±%
Progressive Conservative	Joseph Albert Bélanger	11,006	43.93	–7.90
Liberal	Roger L. Charron	8,961	35.77	+9.96
New Democratic	Raymond Desrochers	5,085	20.30	–2.06
Total valid votes		25,052	99.54	
Total rejected ballots		117	0.46	–0.39
Turnout		25,169	68.76	–6.26
Eligible voters		36,606		
Progressive Conservative hold		Swing		–8.93
Source: Elections Ontario

1971 Ontario general election
Party	Candidate	Votes	%	±%
Progressive Conservative	Joseph Albert Bélanger	10,950	51.84	–6.65
Liberal	Philibert Proulx	5,451	25.80	–9.90
New Democratic	Yvon Montpetit	4,723	22.36	+16.55
Total valid votes		21,124	99.14	
Total rejected ballots		183	0.86	+0.20
Turnout		21,307	75.01	+8.56
Eligible voters		28,404		
Progressive Conservative hold		Swing		+1.63
Source: Elections Ontario

1967 Ontario general election
Party	Candidate	Votes	%
Progressive Conservative	Joseph Albert Bélanger	8,406	58.48
Liberal	Serge Lalonde	5,132	35.71
New Democratic	Wilfrid Latreille	835	5.81
Total valid votes		14,373	99.34
Total rejected ballots		95	0.66
Turnout		14,468	66.46
Eligible voters		21,771	
Progressive Conservative pickup new district.			
Source: Elections Ontario

== See also ==
- List of Ontario provincial electoral districts
- Canadian provincial electoral districts
