= Viateur Éthier =

Canadian politician

- Official 1968 portrait

Member of the Canadian Parliament for Glengarry—Prescott
- In office 1962–1972
- Preceded by: Osie Villeneuve
- Succeeded by: Denis Éthier

Personal details
- Born: June 27, 1915 Sainte-Justine-de-Newton, Quebec
- Died: July 19, 1976 (aged 61)
- Party: Liberal
- Spouse: Marcelle Touchette
- Relations: Denis Éthier, brother

Viateur Éthier (June 27, 1915 – July 19, 1976) was a businessman and political figure in Ontario, Canada. He represented Glengarry—Prescott in the House of Commons of Canada as a Liberal member from 1962 to 1972. He was born in Sainte-Justine-de-Newton, Quebec, in 1915, the son of Albert Éthier, and studied there and at Dalkeith, Ontario. He married Marcelle Touchette in 1948. Éthier owned a bakery in Dalkeith.

Éthier retired from politics in 1972. His brother Denis was elected to the House of Commons for the same seat in 1972 and represented the riding until 1984.

== Altercation with a CBC cameraman ==
On July 9, 1969, Éthier hit a CBC cameraman in the jaw, after he had questioned the bilingual nature of Canada. As Éthier was leaving the House of Commons, he asked a question in French to cameraman Jim Primerous. Primerous responded that he didn't speak French. Éthier was annoyed by this response, and proceeded to lecture the cameraman about the importance of being bilingual when working for a crown corporation. At this, Primerous replied "but is it a bilingual country?" Éthier thought this response was insolent, especially two days after the adoption of the Official Languages Act, and he was not able to hold back his fist.
