= Amanda Simard =

Canadian politician

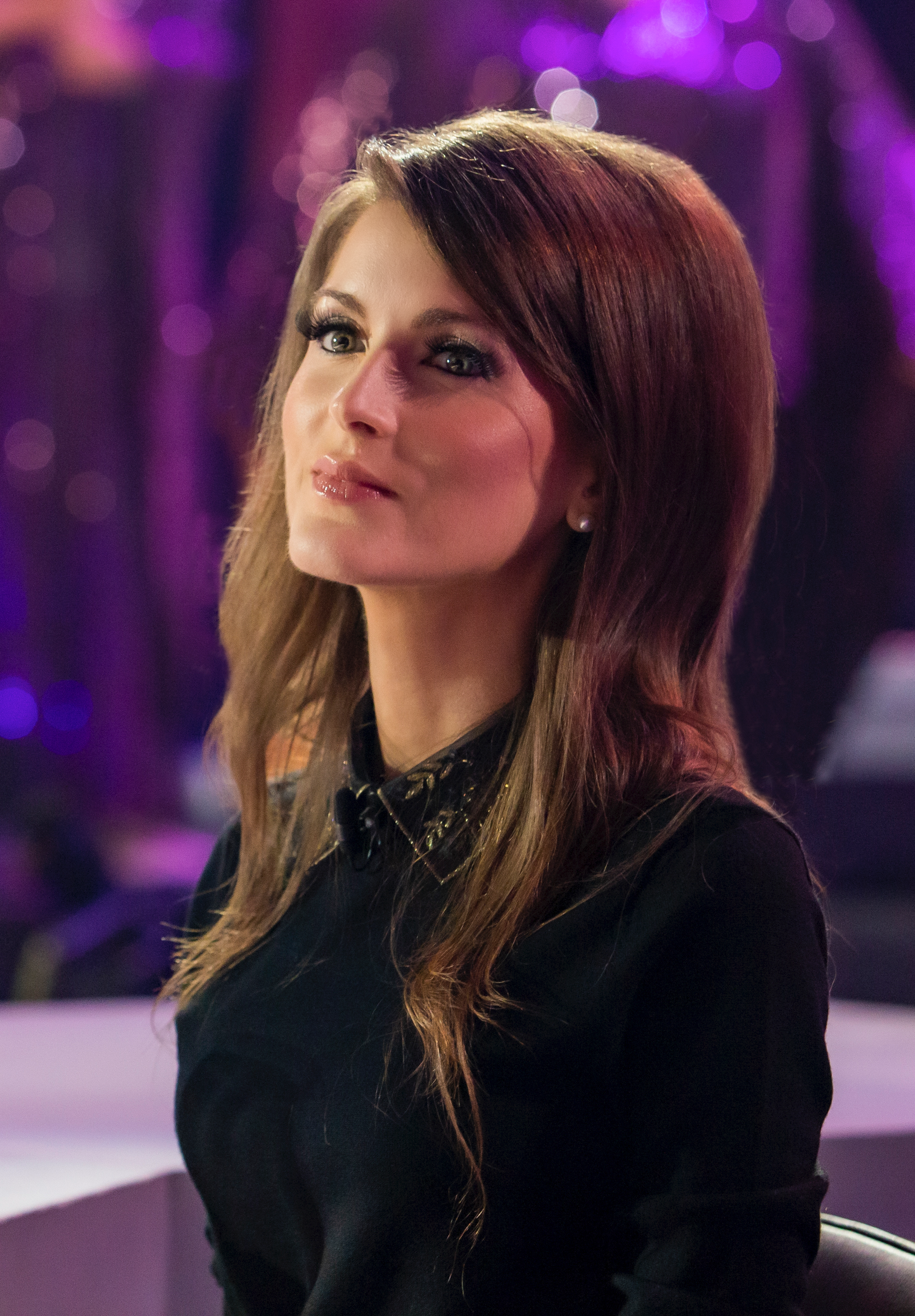
- Amanda Simard MPP (Ontario)

Member of the Ontario Provincial Parliament for Glengarry—Prescott—Russell
- In office June 7, 2018 – June 2, 2022
- Preceded by: Grant Crack
- Succeeded by: Stéphane Sarrazin

Parliamentary Assistant to the Minister of Francophone Affairs
- In office June 29, 2018 – November 29, 2018
- Succeeded by: Gila Martow

Russell Township Councillor
- In office December 1, 2014 – June 7, 2018
- Constituency: At-large

Personal details
- Born: February 27, 1989 (age 37)
- Party: Liberal
- Other political affiliations: Progressive Conservative (until 2018); Independent (2018–2020)
- Domestic partner: Yvan Baker (e. 2023)
- Occupation: Politician, Political staffer

Amanda Simard is the former MPP for Glengarry—Prescott—Russell in the Legislative Assembly of Ontario in the 42nd Parliament of Ontario. Simard was elected in the 2018 provincial election as a member of the Progressive Conservative Party of Ontario, but left the PC caucus on November 29, 2018, after Ontario premier Doug Ford eliminated the province's French-language services commissioner and cancelled plans for a new French language university. On January 16, 2020, Simard joined the Ontario Liberal Party. She lost her seat in the 2022 Ontario general election.

During the 2022 provincial election Simard was defeated by Stéphane Sarrazin.

She is president of the International Network of Young Parliamentarians.

== Early life ==
Simard was raised in Embrun, Ontario, in her riding, where she lives along with her family. She worked to pay for law school, graduating from the University of Ottawa Faculty of Law in 2013. After graduating, her intention to run for public office postponed her plans to be called to the bar in Ontario.

Simard was part of the Senate Page Program from 2009 to 2010 and continued to work at the Senate of Canada as an Executive Assistant and Policy Advisor to Senators from 2010 to 2017.

Simard was elected as a municipal councillor in the Township of Russell in 2014. During her time on council, she was the Chair of the Public Library Board, the Parks, Recreation and Culture Advisory Committee and the ad hoc Recreation Complex Committee. She ceased holding municipal office upon her election to the Legislative Assembly of Ontario in 2018.

Simard is fluent in French and English.

== Legislative career ==
She served as Parliamentary Assistant to the Minister of Francophone Affairs. On December 4, 2017, Simard was acclaimed as the Ontario PC candidate for Glengarry Prescott Russell after another nominee, Derek Duval, was disallowed by the party executive. Simard left the Ontario PC Party on November 29, 2018, to sit as an independent when Premier Doug Ford eliminated the province's French-language services commissioner and cancelled plans for a French-language university. She was praised for defence of her fellow Franco-Ontarians including by a unanimous resolution of the National Assembly of Quebec.

On January 16, 2020, Simard joined the Ontario Liberal Party. She was also selected as the Ontario Liberal Party candidate for the 2022 provincial elections. This nomination was defended by interim leader John Fraser but opposed by former riding MPP Jean-Marc Lalonde. On May 8, 2020, she was named the Ontario Liberal Party Critic for Francophone Affairs, Agriculture, Food and Rural Affairs, Heritage, Sport, Tourism and Culture Industries, and Small Business and Red Tape Reduction.

== Election results ==
2014 Councillors Candidate Russell Township	Vote	%
Amanda Simard	2763	18.68
Jamie Laurin	2124	14.36
Pierre Leroux	2074	14.02
André D. Brisson	1923	13.00
Cindy Saucier	1411	9.54
Patrick Thibodeau	1246	8.43
Raymond Saint-Pierre	1205	8.15
Ron Barr	1184	8.01
Duane Fitzpatrick	858	5.80

2018 Ontario general election: Glengarry—Prescott—Russell
Party	Candidate	Votes	%	±%
Progressive Conservative	Amanda Simard	19,952	40.98	+8.41
Liberal	Pierre Leroux	15,409	31.65	–18.03
New Democratic	Bonnie Jean-Louis	10,610	21.79	+9.29
Green	Daniel Bruce Reid	1,427	2.93	–0.28
Ontario Party	Joël Charbonneau	755	1.55	–
Libertarian	Darcy Neal Donnelly	537	1.10	–
Total valid votes		48,690	98.68	
Total rejected, unmarked and declined ballots		651	1.32	
Turnout		49,341	55.42	
Eligible voters		89,035		
Progressive Conservative notional gain from Liberal		Swing		+13.22
Source: Elections Ontario

2022 Ontario general election: Glengarry—Prescott—Russell
Party	Candidate	Votes	%	±%	Expenditures
Progressive Conservative	Stéphane Sarrazin	18,661	42.05	+1.07	$69,233
Liberal	Amanda Simard	17,529	39.50	+7.85	$51,459
New Democratic	Alicia Eglin	3,789	8.54	–13.25	$804
New Blue	Victor Brassard	1,924	4.34	–	$33,413
Green	Thaila Riden	1,670	3.76	+0.83	$1,098
Ontario Party	Stéphane Aubry	809	1.82	+0.27	$0
Total valid votes/expense limit		44,382	99.24	–	$137,417
Total rejected, unmarked and declined ballots		342	0.76	–0.55	
Turnout		44,724	45.56	–9.85	
Eligible voters		98,155			
Progressive Conservative hold		Swing		▼3.39	
Source: Elections Ontario
