= Jean Poirier =

Canadian politician

Ontario MPP
- In office 1984–1995
- Preceded by: Don Boudria
- Succeeded by: Jean-Marc Lalonde
- Constituency: Prescott and Russell

Personal details
- Born: January 17, 1950 (age 76) Ottawa, Ontario, Canada
- Party: Liberal
- Occupation: Environmental coordinator

Jean Poirier (born January 17, 1950) is a former politician in Ontario, Canada. He was a Liberal member of the Legislative Assembly of Ontario from 1984 to 1995 who represented the Ottawa area riding of Prescott and Russell.

== Background ==
Poirier was educated at the University of Waterloo, receiving a B.E.S. degree in 1972. He served as a project coordinator for Environment Canada from 1972 to 1977, and was a professional community development officer from 1979 to 1984.

== Politics ==
Poirier ran as the Liberal candidate in the riding of Prescott and Russell On December 13, 1984, in a by-election that was called when the previous member, Don Boudria, resigned to run for federal office. He defeated Progressive Conservative candidate Gaston Patenaude by 1,824 votes.

Poirier was re-elected with a significantly increased majority in the 1985 provincial election. The Liberals formed a minority government after this election, and Poirier was appointed as a parliamentary assistant to the Minister of the Environment. He was re-elected by a landslide in the 1987 provincial election, and he was appointed as Deputy Speaker.

Poirier, a former translator, sponsored the Association of Translators and Interpreters of Ontario Act, 1989.

The Liberals were upset by the New Democratic Party in the 1990 provincial election, although Poirier was re-elected by a significant margin. He served as his party's critic for Correctional Services and Intergovernmental Affairs while in opposition.

In 1994, Poirier was one of only three Liberal MPPs, along with Tim Murphy and Dianne Poole, to vote in favour of Bill 167, a government bill which would have extended spousal benefits to same-sex couples. He did not run for re-election in the 1995 provincial election.

Poirier was a member of the Chargé de mission pour la région Amérique committee from 1989 to 1995, was the Ontario president of l'Assemblée internationale des parlementaires de langue française (AIPLF) from 1986 to 1995, and was a member of l'Association parlementaire Ontario-Québec from 1990 to 1995.

== Later life ==
After leaving provincial politics, he worked for l'Assemblée Parlementaire de la Francophonie. He served as regional president of the Association des communautés franco-ontariennes in Eastern Ontario. He resigned in early 2004 to join the organization as its president. During his term, he was mostly known for his refusal to accept funding from Canadian Heritage as a protest from insufficient funding. He resigned in November 2005 to found l'Assemblée de la Francophonie en Ontario.

He now appears as a panelist on the CPAC television program Revue Politique. He is a leading proponent of official bilingualism in Eastern Ontario municipalities.

He was made an Officer of the National Order of Merit by the French Government in May 2002.

== See also ==
- List of University of Waterloo people
