= Russell, Ontario =

Township in eastern Ontario, Canada

Russell
- Township (lower-tier)
- Municipalité de Russell Township
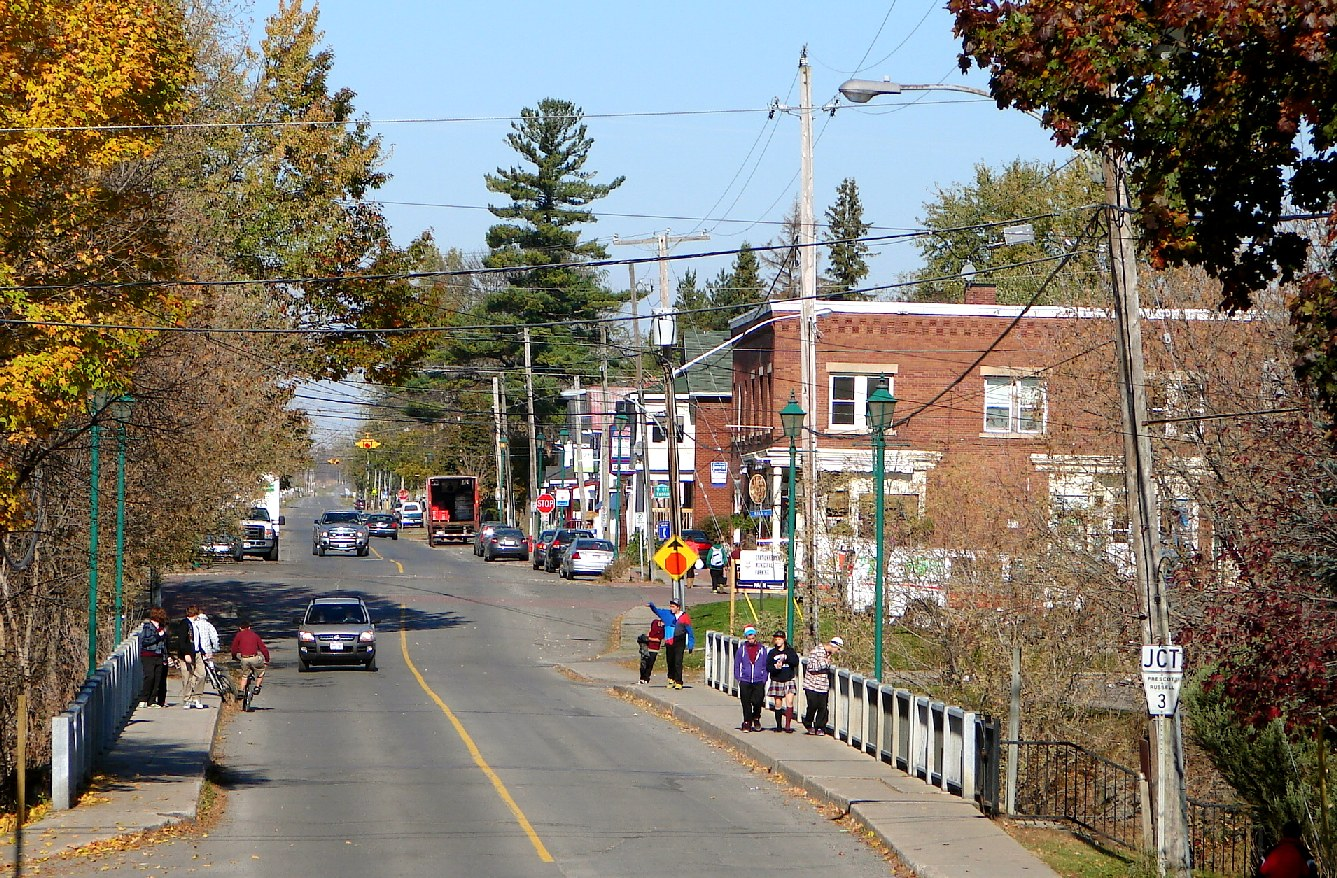
- Russell
- Motto: Pax et prosperitas
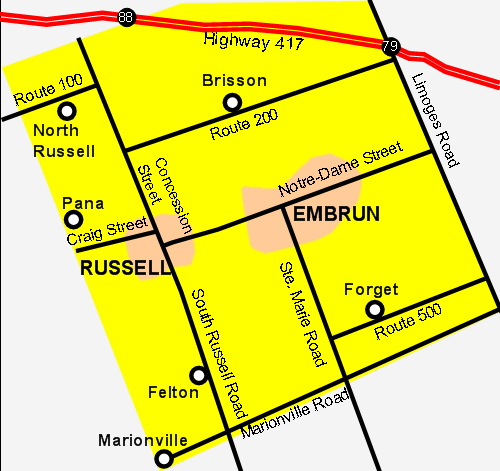
- Map of Russell Township

- Location in Prescott and Russell Location in Ontario
- Coordinates: 45°15′25″N 75°21′30″W
- Country: Canada
- Province: Ontario
- County: Prescott and Russell
- Incorporated: January 1, 1857

Government
  - Mayor: Mike Tarnowski
  - Council: Councillors: Charles Armstrong; Lisa Deacon; Marc Lalonde; Jamie Laurin
  - Fed. riding: Prescott—Russell—Cumberland
  - Prov. riding: Glengarry—Prescott—Russell

Area
  - Land: 198.78 km^{2} (76.75 sq mi)
- Elevation: 60 m (200 ft)

Population (2021)
  - Total: 19,598
  - Density: 98.6/km^{2} (255/sq mi)
- Time zone: UTC−05:00 (EST)
  - Summer (DST): UTC−04:00 (EDT)
- Postal Code: K0A1W0 & K0A1W1 (eastern portion), K4R (western portion)
- Area codes: 613, 343
- Website: www.russell.ca

The Township of Russell is a municipal township, located south-east of Canada's capital of Ottawa in eastern Ontario, in the United Counties of Prescott and Russell, on the Castor River.

The township had a population of 19,598 in the 2021 Canadian census.

== Communities ==
The primary communities are Embrun and Russell. The township administrative offices are located in Embrun.

Smaller communities listed in the official Ontario place names database are Felton, Forget, Marionville, North Russell and Pana. Both the municipal government and Canada Post consider Brisson and Forget to be part of Embrun, and Felton, North Russell, and Pana as part of Russell. Canada Post also considers Marionville to be part of Russell, although the municipality considers Marionville to be separate. As Marionville is on the border of the township, parts of it fall into the neighbouring jurisdictions of North Dundas Township and the City of Ottawa.

== History ==
The Township of Russell and the Village of Russell were both named in relation to Peter Russell more than 200 years ago. Peter Russell was a slave owner and believed to be an active participant in delaying legislation that would put an end to slavery in this region. At the May 2, 2022, Council Meeting, the township council decided to remove Peter Russell as namesake, with the intention to honour all "Russells" who would have helped develop the township.

At one time the township was named Elmsley, it was officially named Russell in 1797.

- 1791: The Parliament of Upper Canada (Ontario) divided the territory into four districts.
- 1792: The four districts were divided into 19 counties. The territory that is now known as the Township of Russell, was in Stormont County.
- January 1, 1800: the subdivision of Stormont County created the County of Russell, which included the Townships of Clarence, Cambridge, Cumberland, Gloucester, Osgoode and Russell.
- 1838: the Townships of Gloucester and Osgoode are annexed to the Carleton County.
- 1841: a municipal law inaugurated the councils of the districts composed of representatives from the townships.
- January 1, 1850: under the Municipal Corporation Act (also known as the Baldwin Act) adopted in 1849, the districts councils were abolished and replaced by the township councils which became the only recognized administrative units. Thus townships and municipalities were born that they delegated representatives to the County Councils. When the number of male owners was less than 100, a township had to unite with another to send a representative to the County. This was the case of the four townships in Russell County (Cambridge, Clarence, Cumberland and Russell) before December 28, 1850. With the increase in population, each township eventually delegated its own representative. Thus we witness the creation of the municipalities of Cumberland in 1850, Clarence and Cambridge in 1854 and Russell on January 1, 1857.
- 2022: the town announces that, due to Peter Russell having been a practitioner of slavery, the town would no longer be named for him, and would instead be named for "all people named Russell who have had a positive impact".

=== The Great Fire in Russell ===
On June 6, 1915, fire started in Murray's Tinsmith Shop and quickly spread from building to building in Russell. Many residents tried to put out the fire with buckets of water, but it was evident they needed more help. Calls were made to the Ottawa Fire Department who came running faster than ever on the New York Central Railroad. They say it was the fastest a train ever went on that track. A total of twenty-five buildings were destroyed. The old land registry building lost its roof in the fire but all the records were saved. The oldest records of the building go back to 1852. The building is still standing today.

=== The New York Central Railway ===
The New York Central Railway was an essential part of Russell's development. In 1884, the Township's council knew that they needed transportation if they wanted the community to grow. There were a few train stations in the surrounding towns like South Indian (today Limoges), Osgood and Morewood, but to get there they needed to pay extra fare to take a stage. In June 1897, the council passed a by-law to raise $10,000 to aid the Ontario Pacific Railway Company to build the railway. In exchange, the railway company had to have at least two passenger trains that would stop for all the passengers each way at all the stations including Russell. The Ontario Pacific Railway Company changed its name to The Ottawa and New York Railway Company in 1898 then the line was leased to the New York Central Railway Company. With the building of the station, Russell Village became the commercial centre for the Township and also for the eastern part of Osgoode and the northern part of Winchester. The hotels were filled with travellers and settlers, new shops were opening and loads of farm animals passed through the stockyards. It became a livestock sales centre. Around 1940 the passenger traffic began diminishing as people had their own cars. In 1954 the passenger train service to Russell was abandoned. On February 14, 1957, the last train ran on the New York Central System.

== Demographics ==
In the 2021 Census of Population conducted by Statistics Canada, Russell had a population of 19,598 living in 7,226 of its 7,335 total private dwellings, a change of 18.6% from its 2016 population of 16,520. With a land area of 198.78 km^{2} (76.75 sq mi), it had a population density of 98.6/km^{2} (255.4/sq mi) in 2021.

Canada census – Russell community profile

	2021	2016	2011
Population	19,598 (+18.6% from 2016)	16,520 (8.36% from 2011)	15,247 (9.8% from 2006)
Land area	198.78 km^{2} (76.75 sq mi)	199.11 km^{2} (76.88 sq mi)	199.06 km^{2} (76.86 sq mi)
Population density	98.6/km^{2} (255/sq mi)	83.0/km^{2} (215/sq mi)	76.6/km^{2} (198/sq mi)
Median age	39.6 (M: 39.2, F: 40.4)	40.6 (M: 40.0, F: 41.2)	39.1 (M: 38.7, F: 39.4)
Private dwellings	7,335 (total) 7,226 (occupied)	6,008 (total)	5,345 (total)
Median household income	$123,000	$102,488	$99,646

References: 2021 2016 2011

Historical census populations – Russell Township

Year	Pop.	±%
1871	2,339	—
1881	3,458	+47.8%
1891	3,918	+13.3%
1901	3,835	−2.1%
1911	3,964	+3.4%
1921	3,752	−5.3%
1931	3,372	−10.1%
1941	3,269	−3.1%

Year	Pop.	±%
1951	3,294	+0.8%
1956	3,395	+3.1%
1961	3,863	+13.8%
1966	3,693	−4.4%
1971	4,157	+12.6%
1976	4,937	+18.8%
1981	5,773	+16.9%
1986	7,772	+34.6%

Year	Pop.	±%
1991	10,659	+37.1%
1996	11,877	+11.4%
2001	12,412	+4.5%
2006	13,883	+11.9%
2011	15,247	+9.8%
2016	16,520	+8.3%
2021	19,598	+18.6%

Source: Statistics Canada

=== Languages ===
The township is predominantly English-speaking with a significant French-speaking minority. 61% of the population speaks English most often at home, while 36% speaks French most often at home. The remaining 3% speak either both languages equally, or speak a non-official language most often. The different parts of the township have different distributions of language, however. Embrun has a slight francophone majority, with 50% French-speaking and 46% English-speaking. Russell, on the other hand, has a stronger anglophone majority, with 86% English-speaking and 12% French-speaking.

In terms of mother tongue, however, the statistics differ. Because it is more common for Francophone Canadians to switch to using English as their main language later in life, than it is for Anglophone Canadians to switch to French, the percentage of the population that has French as a mother tongue is higher than the percentage of the population that uses French as their main language at home. With the mother tongue statistic, the township is 52% anglophone and 43% francophone. In Embrun, 58% have French mother tongue and 38% have English mother tongue. In Russell, 75% have English mother tongue and 19% have French mother tongue.

The most commonly spoken minority languages in the township are Dutch, German, Spanish, and Italian. 280 people across the township have one of these four languages as their mother tongue.

Language spoken most often at home	Entire township (number)	Entire township (percentage)	Embrun (number)	Embrun (percentage)	Russell (number)	Russell (percentage)
English	10,050	61.2%	2,735	43.4%	3,815	85.5%
French	5,830	35.5%	3,405	54.0%	520	11.7%
English and French equally	325	2.0%	110	1.7%	70	1.6%
Other	205	1.2%	55	0.9%	55	1.2%

Mother tongue language	Entire township (number)	Entire township (percentage)	Embrun (number)	Embrun (percentage)	Russell (number)	Russell (percentage)
English	8,550	52.1%	2,610	38.1%	3,330	74.7%
French	7,010	42.7%	3,935	57.5%	865	19.4%
English and French equally	250	1.5%	110	1.6%	65	1.5%
Dutch	105	0.6%	15	0.2%	45	1.0%
German	95	0.6%	5	0.1%	25	0.6%
Spanish	40	0.2%	15	0.2%	10	0.2%
Italian	40	0.2%	20	0.2%	10	0.2%
Others	320	2.0%	135	2.0%	110	2.5%

=== Ethnocultural ancestries ===
The township's population is 93.1% white, 3.1% Aboriginal, 1.2% Black, 0.8% Arab, and 1.7% other visible minority.

The main ethnic ancestries among the white population are French, English, Irish, Scottish, German, and Dutch.

In data:

Single responses: 27.2% of respondents gave a single response of Canadian, while a further 23.6% identified with both Canadian, and one or more other ancestries. 9.7% of respondents gave a single response of French, 3.5% gave a single response of English, 3.1% gave a single response of Dutch, and 2.5% gave a single response of Irish.

Multiple responses: Counting both single and multiple responses, the most commonly identified ethnocultural ancestries were:

Canadian	50.8%
French	34.9%
English	20.1%
Irish	18.0%
Scottish	13.7%
German	7.6%
Dutch	5.2%
North American Indian	3.1%
Italian	2.0%

Percentages are calculated as a proportion of the total number of respondents and may total more than 100% due to dual responses.
All ethnocultural ancestries of more than 2% are listed in the table above according to the exact terminology used by Statistics Canada.

== Organisations ==
=== The Russell Agricultural Society ===
The Russell Agricultural Society remains a vital community resource. According to the legislatures journals, the Agricultural Society for the County of Russell began as an offshoot of the Agricultural Society for the District of Ottawa in 1845. Funds were set aside to judge crops. Records are scant till the first Russell Fair was chartered in 1858. The organization's mandate to promote agricultural heritage and the rural lifestyle is still strongly supported today (2014) with the Russell Fair traditionally held each year in September, on the first weekend after Labour Day. The community grounds are also used to celebrate other events such as Canada Day.

=== The Russell and District Horticultural Society ===
The Russell and District Horticultural Society brought neighbors together then and now. It began with the need for a community spring clean up in 1918. By January 1919 the Society was officially organized to encourage the care of lawns and shrubs and the growing of flowers and trees. Today the group has become dedicated to horticultural education and protection of the natural environment, as it continues to encourage the beautification of the community.

=== The Russell Lions Club ===
The Russell Lions Club grew from a need to fund the non-governmental needs of society. In 1947 the Ottawa Central Lions Club presented a charter to form a Lions Club in Russell. The first activity of the club was to sponsor the Russell Students Band, which then became the Russell Lions Band. The club has continued to grow, holding community dances and fundraisers to provide assistance for the less fortunate in the community. Thanks to the support of the community, the Lions Club of Russell continues today (2014) to contribute effective community service.

=== The Russell Historical Society and the Keith M. Boyd Museum ===
The Russell Historical Society and the Keith M. Boyd Museum preserve rural heritage. With the museum bearing his name, Mr. Boyd was an avid collector of historical artifacts and enjoyed sharing his knowledge with area residents through his articles in the Russell Villager. Donations from others wishing to preserve local history caused his collection to expand, requiring a home of its own. The old Baptist Church became the museum and was officially named after Mr. Boyd and opened in 1989. The Russell Historical Society maintains the buildings and the collections they house.

=== The Kin Club of Russell ===
Chartered October 1, 2011, the Kin Club of Russell is part of Kin Canada. The club has been very active in a relatively short period of time and has completed the following projects; Russell Winter Carnival, Poutmasters (a local fishing derby for mudpout), Reality Tour (drug awareness program for high schools), RocKIN' Away With Diamonds (a '50s and '60s dance), Marchons Pour Jonathan Pitre Butterfly Mile, Catch the Ace lottery and Trivia Nights. Its biggest contribution so far has been consulting and fundraising for the new Russell Township 4.8 million dollar Sports Dome, opened January 8, 2018. The Club meets once a month and consists of both men and women.

== Climate ==
Climate data for Russell
Month	Jan	Feb	Mar	Apr	May	Jun	Jul	Aug	Sep	Oct	Nov	Dec	Year
Record high °C (°F)	13.5 (56.3)	14.0 (57.2)	23.5 (74.3)	31.5 (88.7)	32.8 (91.0)	34.5 (94.1)	36.1 (97.0)	36.5 (97.7)	34.0 (93.2)	28.0 (82.4)	22.8 (73.0)	17.5 (63.5)	36.5 (97.7)
Mean daily maximum °C (°F)	−5.3 (22.5)	−2.7 (27.1)	2.9 (37.2)	11.9 (53.4)	19.4 (66.9)	24.2 (75.6)	26.6 (79.9)	25.3 (77.5)	20.4 (68.7)	13.1 (55.6)	5.9 (42.6)	−1.5 (29.3)	11.7 (53.1)
Daily mean °C (°F)	−10.2 (13.6)	−8.0 (17.6)	−2.2 (28.0)	6.4 (43.5)	13.3 (55.9)	18.4 (65.1)	20.8 (69.4)	19.5 (67.1)	14.8 (58.6)	8.2 (46.8)	1.9 (35.4)	−5.6 (21.9)	6.5 (43.7)
Mean daily minimum °C (°F)	−14.9 (5.2)	−13.1 (8.4)	−7.3 (18.9)	0.9 (33.6)	7.2 (45.0)	12.5 (54.5)	14.9 (58.8)	13.6 (56.5)	9.1 (48.4)	3.2 (37.8)	−2.1 (28.2)	−9.7 (14.5)	1.2 (34.2)
Record low °C (°F)	−40.0 (−40.0)	−38.9 (−38.0)	−32.5 (−26.5)	−16.1 (3.0)	−4.4 (24.1)	−1.0 (30.2)	4.0 (39.2)	1.1 (34.0)	−5.5 (22.1)	−8.5 (16.7)	−23.5 (−10.3)	−33.5 (−28.3)	−40.0 (−40.0)
Average precipitation mm (inches)	75.0 (2.95)	61.1 (2.41)	67.6 (2.66)	75.6 (2.98)	84.5 (3.33)	97.0 (3.82)	94.1 (3.70)	83.9 (3.30)	94.4 (3.72)	86.1 (3.39)	86.9 (3.42)	74.8 (2.94)	981.0 (38.62)
Average rainfall mm (inches)	26.9 (1.06)	23.0 (0.91)	31.6 (1.24)	64.9 (2.56)	84.1 (3.31)	97.0 (3.82)	94.1 (3.70)	83.9 (3.30)	94.4 (3.72)	82.8 (3.26)	70.3 (2.77)	36.4 (1.43)	789.2 (31.07)
Average snowfall cm (inches)	48.2 (19.0)	38.1 (15.0)	36.0 (14.2)	10.7 (4.2)	0.4 (0.2)	0.0 (0.0)	0.0 (0.0)	0.0 (0.0)	0.0 (0.0)	3.3 (1.3)	16.7 (6.6)	38.5 (15.2)	191.8 (75.5)
Average precipitation days (≥ 0.2 mm)	14.6	11.8	12.5	14.4	15.1	14.0	13.7	13.0	14.1	15.5	16.0	14.2	169.1
Average rainy days (≥ 0.2 mm)	4.4	4.5	7.5	12.6	15	14	13.7	13	14.1	15	12.7	6.6	133.2
Average snowy days (≥ 0.2 cm)	11.8	8.7	6.6	2.9	0.12	0	0	0	0	0.81	4.5	9.6	45
Source: Environment Canada

== Politics ==
=== Township Council ===
The current council of Russell Township.

- Mayor: Mike Tarnowski
- Councillors:

- Charles Armstrong
- Lisa Deacon
- Mark Lalonde
- Jamie Laurin

The municipal offices are located at 717 Notre-Dame St. in Embrun.

=== Federal and provincial representation ===
The township is located within the federal electoral district of Glengarry—Prescott—Russell. It is represented by Francis Drouin (Liberal). The provincial electoral district, also named Glengarry—Prescott—Russell, is represented by Amanda Simard (Independent).

Russell federal election results
Year	Liberal		Conservative		New Democratic		Green	
2021	42%	4,791	38%	4,355	12%	1,430	2%	226
2019	43%	4,710	40%	4,474	12%	1,306	3%	328

Russell provincial election results
Year	PC		New Democratic		Liberal		Green	
2022	42%	3,326	9%	756	39%	3,125	4%	335
2018	47%	3,932	18%	1,495	31%	2,620	3%	241

=== List of former reeves and mayors ===
- William Craig, 1864–1867
- William Z. Helmer, 1870–1871, 1879, 1887
- Arthur Carscadden, 1872
- W.R. Petrie, 1883–1884
- Peter Bolton, 1885–1886, 1888–1889
- Antoine Paquet, 1890, 1901–1903, 1909–1910
- Duncan McDiarmid, 1891–1895, 1898–1900
- Cyprien St-Onge, 1896–1897, 1907, 1911–1913
- Trefflé Émard, 1904–1905, 1916–1918, 1922
- William Argue, 1906
- Ovila Duford, 1908
- H.A. Dupuis, 1908
- Émile-Joseph Ménard, 1914–1915, 1919
- Félix A. Dignard, 1920–1921, 1923–1927
- Adrien L’Ériger, 1928–1937
- Médéric Bouchard, 1938–1940, 1944–1949
- Guillaume Émard, 1941–1943
- Émile B. Brisson, 1950–1951
- Anastase Grégoire, 1952–1961
- Lionel Brisson, 1962–1963
- W.E. Burton, 1964–1972
- Bernard Pelot, 1973v1974
- Gaston Patenaude, 1975–1993, 1997–2002
- Roger Pharand, 1994–1996
- Michael McHugh, 2003–2005
- Ken Hill, 2006–2009
- Jean-Paul St-Pierre, 2010–2014
- Pierre Leroux, 2015–2024
- Mike Tarnowski, 2024–present

== Notable people ==
- Khem Birch, professional basketball player for the Toronto Raptors of the National Basketball Association.
- Jean-Serge Brisson, former leader of the Libertarian Party of Canada and former councillor municipal of Russell.
- Jonathan Pitre

== See also ==
- Russell Transpo - local public transit service
- List of townships in Ontario
- List of francophone communities in Ontario
