= Kathleen Ethier =

American social psychologist

Kathleen A. Ethier is an American social psychologist and public health official with the Centers for Disease Control and Prevention (CDC). In 2016, she was appointed the Director of CDC's Division of Adolescent and School Health in the National Center for HIV/AIDS, Viral Hepatitis, STD, and TB Prevention. As of 2020, Ethier is also head of the CDC's community mitigation task force for the COVID-19 pandemic.

== Biography ==
Ethier received her bachelor of arts in psychology at the College of New Rochelle in 1986. She then received her PhD in social psychology from the Graduate Center of the City University of New York (CUNY) in 1995, examining women's reaction to their initial pregnancy. She researched at Yale University for six years, working on the prevention of HIV and other sexually transmitted diseases in women.

She joined the CDC in 1999, where she served as Adolescent Health Goal Team Leader (2007–09) and Associate Director in the Public Health Practice of the National Center for Chronic Disease Prevention and Health Promotion (2009–10), and then directed the Program, Performance and Evaluation Office in the CDC Director's Office (2010–16), before taking up her current appointment. At the CDC, with Laura Kann and Timothy McManus, she carried out a decade-long survey of risky behavior in young people in 29 U.S. states, published in 2018, which found that a decreasing proportion of high-school students stated that they had experienced sexual intercourse.

In 2020, as head of the CDC's COVID-19 community mitigation task force, researching non-pharmaceutical interventions to prevent spread of the virus, she was the lead author on a comparative study of cell phone usage – used as a measure of people's mobility – in the metropolitan areas of New York City, Seattle, New Orleans and the Bay Area after shelter-at-home orders were issued, which showed that a reduction in mobility was accompanied by a decrease in the growth rate of COVID-19 cases.

== Selected publications ==
- Lasry A, Kidder D, Hast M, Poovey J, Sunshine G, Winglee K, Zviedrite N, Ahmed F, Ethier KA (2020). "Timing of Community Mitigation and Changes in Reported COVID-19 and Community Mobility - Four U.S. Metropolitan Areas, February 26-April 1, 2020". MMWR Morb Mortal Wkly Rep. 69: 451–457. doi:10.15585/mmwr.mm6915e2. PMC 7755061. PMID 32298245.
- Kann Laura, McManus Tim, Ethier Kathleen A (2018). "Youth Risk Behavior Surveillance — United States, 2017". Morbidity and Mortality Weekly Report Surveillance Summaries. 67: 1–114. doi:10.1016/j.fldmyc.2017.10.005. PMC 6002027. PMID 29902162. (cited 898 times on Google Scholar)
- Kathleen A. Ethier, Kay Deaux (1994). Negotiating social identity when contexts change: Maintaining identification and responding to threat. Journal of Personality and Social Psychology, 67: pages 243–251 (cited 1090 times on Google Scholar)
