= Denis Éthier =

Canadian politician

Member of the Canadian Parliament for Glengarry—Prescott—Russell
- In office 1972–1984
- Preceded by: Viateur Éthier
- Succeeded by: Don Boudria

Personal details
- Born: March 25, 1926 Sainte-Justine-de-Newton, Quebec
- Died: March 15, 2017 (aged 90) Alexandria, Ontario
- Party: Liberal Party of Canada
- Relations: Viateur Éthier, brother

Denis Éthier (25 March 1926 – 15 March 2017) was a Liberal Party member of the House of Commons of Canada. His career included business such as merchandising.

Éthier represented the Ontario riding of Glengarry—Prescott—Russell which he first won in the 1972 federal election. He replaced his brother Viateur Éthier, who had represented the riding under its previous name Glengarry—Prescott since 1962. He was re-elected there in 1974, 1979 and 1980. He left federal politics in 1984 and did not participate in that year's federal election after serving four consecutive terms from the 29th to the 32nd Canadian Parliaments.
