= Giovanna Mingarelli =

Canadian politician

Giovanna Mingarelli MP

Member of Parliament for Prescott—Russell—Cumberland
- Incumbent
- Assumed office April 28, 2025
- Preceded by: Francis Drouin

Personal details
- Party: Liberal
- Education: Carleton University
- Website: giovannamingarelli.com

Giovanna S. C. Mingarelli MP is a Canadian politician from the Liberal Party of Canada. She was elected Member of Parliament for Prescott—Russell—Cumberland in the 2025 Canadian federal election. She previously worked for former Prime Minister Paul Martin. She is married to Brandon A. Lee, former Canadian Consul General to Silicon Valley/San Francisco.

== Biography ==
Mingarelli holds a degree in Political Science from Carleton University. She has a career in the technology sector. Mingarelli is the CEO and Co-Founder of two international companies, M&C Consulting and MC2. She is a regular media contributor to outlets including the Huffington Post, The Hill Times, Harvard Business Review and CBC/Radio-Canada.

At the time of the 2025 Canadian federal election, she lived in Rockland, Ontario.

== Electoral record ==
2025 Canadian federal election: Prescott—Russell—Cumberland
Party	Candidate	Votes	%	±%
Liberal	Giovanna Mingarelli	39,110	54.78	+7.56
Conservative	Julie Séguin	28,005	40.35	+7.94
New Democratic	Ryder Finlay	1,730	2.42	-8.37
Green	Thaila Riden	787	1.10	-0.93
People's	Deborah Perrier	725	1.02	-5.41
Independent	Jason St-Louis	236	0.33	N/A
Total valid votes		71,393	99.26	
Total rejected ballots		530	0.74	-0.60
Turnout		71,923	75.78	+5.52
Eligible voters		94,910		
Liberal notional hold		Swing		–0.19
Source: Elections Canada
