= Francis Drouin =

Canadian Liberal politician (born 1983)

President of Assemblée Parlementaire de la Francophonie
- Incumbent
- Assumed office July 8, 2022
- Preceded by: Adama Bictogo

Member of Parliament for Glengarry—Prescott—Russell
- In office October 19, 2015 – March 23, 2025
- Preceded by: Pierre Lemieux
- Succeeded by: Giovanna Mingarelli

Personal details
- Born: October 7, 1983 (age 43) Hawkesbury, Ontario, Canada
- Party: Liberal
- Domestic partner: Kate Forrest
- Education: University of Ottawa; La Cité collégiale
- Profession: Consultant

Francis Drouin (born October 7, 1983) is a Canadian Liberal politician, who was elected to represent the riding of Glengarry—Prescott—Russell in the House of Commons of Canada in the 2015 federal election. He did not seek re-election in 2025.

== Early life ==
Drouin was born and raised in Hawkesbury, Ontario. After obtaining a diploma in business administration from La Cité collégiale, he attended the University of Ottawa, where he earned a bachelor's degree in commerce. He worked as a special assistant to Ontario Premier Dalton McGuinty for four years, and then joined a government relations firm as a communications consultant. He continued to work as a consultant in various capacities thereafter. He has volunteered on the board of his alma mater, La Cité.

== Federal politics ==
Drouin joined the Liberal Party when he was 17 years old, and served for two years as president of the Young Liberals in Glengarry—Prescott—Russell. He managed the Liberal campaigns there in the 2011 federal and 2014 provincial elections. Drouin won the federal Liberal nomination for the 2015 federal election in January 2015. He won the election, unseating three-term Conservative incumbent Pierre Lemieux by over 10,000 votes.

== Committees ==
He was a member of the Official Languages Committee and Agriculture and Agri-Food

He was previously a sitting member of the committee on Covid-19 Pandemic and Government Operations and Estimates

On December 3, 2021, he was appointed Parliamentary Secretary to the Minister of Agriculture and Agri-Food.

== Controversies ==
In April 2018, Drouin was alleged to have groped a woman at a Halifax bar during the Liberal Party policy convention. Drouin denied the allegations stating he was misidentified. Police did not lay charges.

In May 2024, Drouin received backlash after remarks about witnesses in the House of Commons Standing Committee on Official Languages, calling them "full of shit" and referring their position on the issue as "extremist".

== Electoral record ==
2021 Canadian federal election: Glengarry—Prescott—Russell
| Party | Candidate | Votes | % | ±% | Expenditures |
|---|---|---|---|---|---|
| Liberal | Francis Drouin | 30,362 | 46.1 | -1.4 | $90,470.57 |
| Conservative | Susan McArthur | 21,979 | 33.3 | -2.7 | $99,861.23 |
| New Democratic | Konstantine Malakos | 7,022 | 10.7 | +0.3 | $7,774.48 |
| People's | Brennan Austring | 4,458 | 6.8 | +5.0 | $0.00 |
| Green | Daniel Lapierre | 1,350 | 2.0 | -1.2 | $1,041.48 |
| Free | Marc Bisaillon | 422 | 0.6 | – | $1,105.14 |
| Independent | The Joker | 314 | 0.5 | – | $0.00 |
| Total valid votes/expense limit | | 65,907 | – | – | $122,997.84 |
| Total rejected ballots | | 901 | | | |
| Turnout | | 66,808 | 70.06 | | |
| Eligible voters | | 95,356 | | | |
Source: Elections Canada

2019 Canadian federal election: Glengarry—Prescott—Russell
| Party | Candidate | Votes | % | ±% | Expenditures |
|---|---|---|---|---|---|
| Liberal | Francis Drouin | 31,293 | 47.56 | -5.71 | $82,180.98 |
| Conservative | Pierre Lemieux | 23,660 | 35.96 | -0.45 | $112,830.16 |
| New Democratic | Konstantine Malakos | 6,851 | 10.41 | +2.49 | $3,975.49 |
| Green | Marthe Lépine † | 2,113 | 3.21 | +1.41 | none listed |
| People's | Jean-Jacques Desgranges | 1,174 | 1.78 | | none listed |
| Libertarian | Darcy Neal Donnelly | 262 | 0.40 | -0.19 | none listed |
| Independent | Daniel John Fey | 239 | 0.36 | | $4,778.11 |
| Rhinoceros | Marc-Antoine Gagnier | 199 | 0.30 | | none listed |
| Total valid votes/expense limit | | 65,791 | 99.03 | | |
| Total rejected ballots | | 645 | 0.97 | +0.35 | |
| Turnout | | 66,436 | 71.78 | -3.29 | |
| Eligible voters | | 92,555 | | | |
| Liberal hold | | Swing | | -2.63 | |
Source: Elections Canada † The Green Party of Canada dropped Marthe Lépine for her anti-abortion views; she ran as an independent instead.

2015 Canadian federal election: Glengarry—Prescott—Russell
| Party | Candidate | Votes | % | ±% | Expenditures |
|---|---|---|---|---|---|
| Liberal | Francis Drouin | 34,189 | 53.28 | +22.68 | – |
| Conservative | Pierre Lemieux | 23,367 | 36.41 | -12.4 | – |
| New Democratic | Normand Laurin | 5,087 | 7.93 | -8.74 | – |
| Green | Genevieve Malouin-Diraddo | 1,153 | 1.8 | -1.78 | – |
| Libertarian | Jean-Serge Brisson | 377 | 0.59 | +0.25 | – |
| Total valid votes/Expense limit | | 64,173 | 100.0 | | $222,406.73 |
| Total rejected ballots | | 399 | – | – | |
| Turnout | | 64,572 | 75.6% | – | |
| Eligible voters | | 85,388 | | | |
| Liberal gain from Conservative | | Swing | | 28.83% | |
Source: Elections Canada
