= Prescott—Russell—Cumberland =

Federal electoral district in Ontario, Canada

Coordinates: 45.41°N 75.12°W

Ontario electoral district
- Interactive map of riding boundaries from the 2025 federal election

Federal electoral district
- Legislature: House of Commons
MP
Giovanna Mingarelli
Liberal
- District created: 1952
- First contested: 1953
- Last contested: 2021
- District webpage: profile, map

Demographics
- Population (2011): 106,240
- Electors (2015): 84,340
- Area (km²): 3,018
- Pop. density (per km²): 35.2
- Census division(s): Ottawa, Prescott and Russell
- Census subdivision(s): Ottawa (part), Clarence-Rockland, Russell, The Nation, Hawkesbury, Alfred and Plantagenet, Champlain, Casselman, East Hawkesbury

Prescott—Russell—Cumberland (formerly Glengarry—Prescott—Russell and Glengarry—Prescott) is a federal electoral district in Ontario, Canada, that has been represented in the House of Commons of Canada since 1953.

== Geography ==
The district includes the United Counties of Prescott and Russell and the former City of Cumberland (except for Orleans).

Major communities include Hawkesbury, Ottawa (part), Russell, Embrun, Casselman, East Hawkesbury, Alfred and Plantagenet, Champlain, Clarence-Rockland and The Nation. Its area is 3,049 km^{2}.

== History ==
The district was created in 1952 as "Glengarry—Prescott" from parts of Glengarry and Prescott ridings. It consisted of Prescott County and Glengarry County.

In 1966, it was expanded to include Russell County excluding Cumberland Township. In 1970, the name was changed to "Glengarry—Prescott—Russell".

In 1976, the district was redefined to exclude Charlottenburgh Township and include Cumberland Township.

In 1987, it was redefined to consist of the United Counties of Prescott and Russell, the County of Glengarry and Akwesasne Indian Reserve No. 59 in the United Counties of Stormont, Dundas and Glengarry, and the part of the Township of Cumberland excluding the part north of Innes Road and west of Regional Road No. 57 and Trim Road.

In 1996, it was redefined to consist of the United Counties of Prescott and Russell, the County of Glengarry (excluding the Township of Charlottenburgh), the Township of Cumberland in the Regional Municipality of Ottawa-Carleton, excluding the part west of Trim Road and North of Innes Road.

In 2003, it was redefined to consist of the United Counties of Prescott and Russell, the Township of North Glengarry in the United Counties of Stormont, Dundas and Glengarry, and the part of the City of Ottawa east Cardinal Creek, Regional Road No. 174, Trim Road Wall Road, Mer Bleue Road and Boundary Road.

Following the 2012 redistribution of Canada's ridings, the riding lost the Cardinal Creek and Carlsbad Springs area to Orléans.

Following the 2022 Canadian federal electoral redistribution, the riding was renamed Prescott—Russell—Cumberland prior to the 2025 Canadian federal election. It gained the area east of Cardinal Creek and the rural area around the Mer Bleue Bog south to Highway 417 (including Carlsbad Springs and Ramsayville) from Orléans, and gained a small piece of territory south of Innes Road from Ottawa—Vanier. It lost all of its territory in the City of Ottawa south of Highway 417 to Carleton and North Glengarry to Stormont—Dundas—Glengarry.

== Demographics ==
According to the 2021 Canadian census, 2023 representation

Racial groups: 90.2% White, 4.4% Indigenous, 2.0% Black
Languages: 59.8% French, 40.0% English
Religions: 76.8% Christian (62.3% Catholic, 2.5% United Church, 2.4% Anglican, 9.7% Other), 1.0% Muslim, 21.3% None
Median income: $48,400 (2020)
Average income: $56,100 (2020)

== Members of Parliament ==
This riding has elected the following members of Parliament:

Parliament	Years	Member	Party
Glengarry—Prescott; Riding created from Glengarry and Prescott
22nd	1953–1957	Raymond Bruneau	Liberal
23rd	1957–1958	Osie Villeneuve	Progressive Conservative
24th	1958–1962	Osie Villeneuve	Progressive Conservative
25th	1962–1963	Viateur Éthier	Liberal
26th	1963–1965	Viateur Éthier	Liberal
27th	1965–1968	Viateur Éthier	Liberal
28th	1968–1972	Viateur Éthier	Liberal
Glengarry—Prescott—Russell
29th	1972–1974	Denis Éthier	Liberal
30th	1974–1979	Denis Éthier	Liberal
31st	1979–1980	Denis Éthier	Liberal
32nd	1980–1984	Denis Éthier	Liberal
33rd	1984–1988	Don Boudria	Liberal
34th	1988–1993	Don Boudria	Liberal
35th	1993–1997	Don Boudria	Liberal
36th	1997–2000	Don Boudria	Liberal
37th	2000–2004	Don Boudria	Liberal
38th	2004–2006	Don Boudria	Liberal
39th	2006–2008	Pierre Lemieux	Conservative
40th	2008–2011	Pierre Lemieux	Conservative
41st	2011–2015	Pierre Lemieux	Conservative
42nd	2015–2019	Francis Drouin	Liberal
43rd	2019–2021	Francis Drouin	Liberal
44th	2021–2025	Francis Drouin	Liberal
Prescott—Russell—Cumberland
45th	2025–present	Giovanna Mingarelli	Liberal

== Election results ==
=== Prescott—Russell—Cumberland ===
2025 Canadian federal election
Party	Candidate	Votes	%	±%
Liberal	Giovanna Mingarelli	39,110	54.78	+7.56
Conservative	Julie Séguin	28,005	40.35	+7.94
New Democratic	Ryder Finlay	1,730	2.42	-8.37
Green	Thaila Riden	787	1.10	-0.93
People's	Deborah Perrier	725	1.02	-5.41
Independent	Jason St-Louis	236	0.33	N/A
Total valid votes		71,393	99.26	
Total rejected ballots		530	0.74	-0.60
Turnout		71,923	75.78	+5.52
Eligible voters		94,910		
Liberal notional hold		Swing		–0.19
Source: Elections Canada

2021 federal election redistributed results
Party	Vote	%
Liberal	29,091	47.22
Conservative	19,964	32.40
New Democratic	6,651	10.80
People's	3,958	6.42
Green	1,255	2.04
Free	400	0.65
Others	290	0.47
Total valid votes	61,609	98.66
Rejected ballots	836	1.34
Registered voters/ estimated turnout	88,871	70.26

=== Glengarry—Prescott—Russell ===
View source data.
Graph of election results in Glengarry—Prescott—Russell (1970-present, minor parties that never got 2% of the vote or didn't run consistently are omitted)

2021 Canadian federal election: Glengarry—Prescott—Russell
Party	Candidate	Votes	%	±%	Expenditures
Liberal	Francis Drouin	30,362	46.1	-1.4	$90,470.57
Conservative	Susan McArthur	21,979	33.3	-2.7	$99,861.23
New Democratic	Konstantine Malakos	7,022	10.7	+0.3	$7,774.48
People's	Brennan Austring	4,458	6.8	+5.0	$0.00
Green	Daniel Lapierre	1,350	2.0	-1.2	$1,041.48
Free	Marc Bisaillon	422	0.6	–	$1,105.14
Independent	The Joker	314	0.5	–	$0.00
Total valid votes/expense limit		65,907	–	–	$122,997.84
Total rejected ballots		901			
Turnout		66,808	70.06		
Eligible voters		95,356			
Source: Elections Canada

2019 Canadian federal election: Glengarry—Prescott—Russell
Party	Candidate	Votes	%	±%	Expenditures
Liberal	Francis Drouin	31,293	47.56	-5.71	$82,180.98
Conservative	Pierre Lemieux	23,660	35.96	-0.45	$112,830.16
New Democratic	Konstantine Malakos	6,851	10.41	+2.49	$3,975.49
Green	Marthe Lépine †	2,113	3.21	+1.41	none listed
People's	Jean-Jacques Desgranges	1,174	1.78		none listed
Libertarian	Darcy Neal Donnelly	262	0.40	-0.19	none listed
Independent	Daniel John Fey	239	0.36		$4,778.11
Rhinoceros	Marc-Antoine Gagnier	199	0.30		none listed
Total valid votes/expense limit		65,791	99.03		
Total rejected ballots		645	0.97	+0.35	
Turnout		66,436	71.78	-3.29	
Eligible voters		92,555			
Liberal hold		Swing		-2.63	
Source: Elections Canada † The Green Party of Canada dropped Marthe Lépine for her anti-abortion views; she ran as an independent instead.

2015 Canadian federal election
Party	Candidate	Votes	%	±%	Expenditures
Liberal	Francis Drouin	34,189	53.28	+22.68	$114,201.86
Conservative	Pierre Lemieux	23,367	36.41	-12.40	$131,909.88
New Democratic	Normand Laurin	5,087	7.93	-8.74	$4,769.31
Green	Genevieve Malouin-Diraddo	1,153	1.80	-1.78	$156.86
Libertarian	Jean-Serge Brisson	377	0.59	+0.25	–
Total valid votes/expense limit		64,173	99.38		$223,399.99
Total rejected ballots		399	0.62	–	
Turnout		64,572	75.07	–	
Eligible voters		86,010			
Liberal gain from Conservative		Swing		+17.54	
Source: Elections Canada

2011 federal election redistributed results
Party	Vote	%
Conservative	26,802	48.82
Liberal	16,801	30.60
New Democratic	9,149	16.66
Green	1,966	3.58
Libertarian	187	0.34

2011 Canadian federal election
Party	Candidate	Votes	%	±%	Expenditures
Conservative	Pierre Lemieux	28,174	48.80	+1.50	–
Liberal	Julie Bourgeois	17,705	30.67	-6.19	–
New Democratic	Denis Séguin	9,608	16.64	+6.18	–
Green	Sylvie Lemieux	2,049	3.55	-1.81	–
Libertarian	Jean-Serge Brisson	194	0.34	–	–
Total valid votes/expense limit		57,730	100.00		–
Total rejected ballots		304	0.52	–	
Turnout		58,034	68.80	–	
Eligible voters		84,347	–	–	

2008 Canadian federal election
Party	Candidate	Votes	%	±%	Expenditures
Conservative	Pierre Lemieux	25,659	47.30	+5.75	$80,105
Liberal	Dan Boudria	19,997	36.86	-4.33	$71,845
New Democratic	Jean-Sébastien Caron	5,674	10.46	-2.28	$2,043
Green	Sylvie Lemieux	2,908	5.36	+0.86	$5,306
Total valid votes/expense limit		54,238	100.00		$85,679

2006 Canadian federal election
Party	Candidate	Votes	%	±%
Conservative	Pierre Lemieux	22,990	41.55	+4.1
Liberal	René Berthiaume	22,787	41.19	-6.7
New Democratic	Jo-Ann Fennessey	7,049	12.74	+4.3
Green	Bonnie Jean-Louis	2,494	4.50	-0.8
Total valid votes		55,320	100.0	

2004 Canadian federal election
Party	Candidate	Votes	%	±%
Liberal	Don Boudria	23,921	47.9	-20.1
Conservative	Alain Lalonde	18,729	37.5	+10.2
New Democratic	Martin Cauvier	4,238	8.5	+4.4
Green	Roy Fjarlie	2,634	5.3	
Christian Heritage	Tim Bloedow	464	0.9	
Total valid votes		49,986	100.0	

Note: Conservative vote is compared to the total of the Canadian Alliance vote and Progressive Conservative vote in 2000 election.

2000 Canadian federal election
Party	Candidate	Votes	%	±%
Liberal	Don Boudria	31,371	68.0	-4.0
Alliance	L. Sebastian Anders	8,632	18.7	+9.2
Progressive Conservative	Ashley O'Kurley	3,942	8.5	-4.0
New Democratic	Guy Belle-Isle	1,877	4.1	-0.6
Natural Law	Wayne Foster	334	0.7	+0.3
Total valid votes		46,156	100.0	

Note: Canadian Alliance vote is compared to the Reform vote in 1997 election.

1997 Canadian federal election: Glengarry—Prescott—Russell
Party	Candidate	Votes	%	±%	Expenditures
Liberal	Don Boudria	34,986	71.98	−8.23	$ 46,386
Progressive Conservative	France Somers	6,109	12.57	+4.38	10,057
Reform	Mike Lancop	4,599	9.46	+1.48	2,386
New Democratic	Fred Cappuccino	2,289	4.71	+2.37	11,524
Green	Richard Kerr	417	0.86		499
Natural Law	Mary Glasser	207	0.43	−0.42	0
Total valid votes/expense limit		48,607	100.00	−12.93	$ 62,182
Total rejected ballots		598	1.22		
Turnout		49,205	68.68		
Electors on the lists		71,639			
Sources: Elections Canada Official Voting Results and Financial Returns

1993 Canadian federal election
Party	Candidate	Votes	%	±%
Liberal	Don Boudria	44,775	80.2	+9.5
Progressive Conservative	France Somers	4,572	8.2	-10.9
Reform	Sam McCracken	4,456	8.0	
New Democratic	Pascal Villeneuve	1,304	2.3	-6.8
Natural Law	Pierrette Blondin	473	0.8	
Libertarian	Jean-Serge Brisson	244	0.4	-0.2
Total valid votes		55,824	100.0	

1988 Canadian federal election
Party	Candidate	Votes	%	±%
Liberal	Don Boudria	35,280	70.7	+17.6
Progressive Conservative	Roger R. Presseault	9,517	19.1	-13.9
New Democratic	Helena McCuaig	4,537	9.1	-4.8
Libertarian	Jean-Serge Brisson	335	0.7	
Commonwealth of Canada	John Feres	199	0.4	
Total valid votes		49,868	100.0	

1984 Canadian federal election
Party	Candidate	Votes	%	±%
Liberal	Don Boudria	26,057	53.1	-15.4
Progressive Conservative	John Stante	16,170	33.0	+13.3
New Democratic	Annemarie Collard	6,838	13.9	+13.7
Total valid votes		49,065	100.0	

1980 Canadian federal election
Party	Candidate	Votes	%	±%
Liberal	Denis Éthier	28,189	68.5	+3.1
Progressive Conservative	Gordon Johnson	8,113	19.7	-4.7
New Democratic	Claude Dion	4,781	11.6	+1.6
Marxist–Leninist	Gary O'Brien	90	0.2	0.0
Total valid votes		41,173	100.0	

1979 Canadian federal election
Party	Candidate	Votes	%	±%
Liberal	Denis Éthier	27,106	65.3	+4.9
Progressive Conservative	Gordon Johnson	10,112	24.4	+2.8
New Democratic	Paul De Broeck	4,164	10.0	-7.9
Marxist–Leninist	Gary O'Brien	107	0.3	
Total valid votes		41,489	100.0	

1974 Canadian federal election
Party	Candidate	Votes	%	±%
Liberal	Denis Éthier	18,478	60.5	+8.4
Progressive Conservative	Bernard Pelot	6,595	21.6	-2.8
New Democratic	Raymond Desrochers	5,484	17.9	+9.2
Total valid votes		30,557	100.0	

1972 Canadian federal election
Party	Candidate	Votes	%	±%
Liberal	Denis Éthier	14,780	52.1	-9.9
Progressive Conservative	J.-L. Montreuil	6,924	24.4	-6.9
New Democratic	Jacques Boyer	2,495	8.8	+2.1
Independent	Bernard Pelot	2,479	8.7	
Social Credit	W.-R. Marin	1,710	6.0	
Total valid votes		28,388	100.0	

=== Glengarry—Prescott ===
Graph of election results in Glengarry—Prescott (1952-1970, minor parties that never got 2% of the vote or didn't run consistently are omitted)

1968 Canadian federal election
Party	Candidate	Votes	%	±%
Liberal	Viateur Éthier	14,970	62.0	+8.3
Progressive Conservative	J.-Lomer Carriere	7,564	31.3	-2.6
New Democratic	Claude Demers	1,606	6.7	
Total valid votes		24,140	100.0	

1965 Canadian federal election
Party	Candidate	Votes	%	±%
Liberal	Viateur Éthier	10,339	53.7	+3.9
Progressive Conservative	Albert-R. Cadieux	6,529	33.9	+5.9
Ralliement créditiste	Raymond Berthiaume	1,204	6.3	-7.8
New Democratic	Wilfrid Latreille	1,173	6.1	+4.1
Total valid votes		19,245	100.0	

Note: Ralliement créditiste vote is compared to Social Credit vote in 1963 election.

1963 Canadian federal election
Party	Candidate	Votes	%	±%
Liberal	Viateur Éthier	9,906	49.8	-4.5
Progressive Conservative	J.-Marcel Gelineau	5,568	28.0	-12.3
Social Credit	Rolland Cholette	2,786	14.0	+10.9
Independent Liberal	Raymond Bruneau	1,234	6.2	
New Democratic	Peter Marcel Schneider	394	2.0	
Total valid votes		19,888	100.0	

1962 Canadian federal election
Party	Candidate	Votes	%	±%
Liberal	Viateur Éthier	11,043	54.3	+5.6
Progressive Conservative	Osie Villeneuve	8,186	40.3	-11.0
Social Credit	Rolland Cholette	639	3.1	
New Democratic	René Benoit	461	2.3	
Total valid votes		20,329	100.0	

Note: NDP vote is compared to CCF vote in 1958 election.

1958 Canadian federal election
Party	Candidate	Votes	%	±%
Progressive Conservative	Osie Villeneuve	10,385	51.3	+11.1
Liberal	Raymond Bruneau	9,865	48.7	+16.2
Total valid votes		20,250	100.0	

1957 Canadian federal election
Party	Candidate	Votes	%	±%
Progressive Conservative	Osie Villeneuve	8,241	40.2	+9.6
Liberal	Raymond Bruneau	6,661	32.5	-8.0
Independent Liberal	René Bertrand	5,414	26.4	
Social Credit	Patrice Brunet	198	1.0	
Total valid votes		20,514	100.0	

1953 Canadian federal election
Party	Candidate	Votes	%
Liberal	Raymond Bruneau	7,800	40.4
Progressive Conservative	Fernand Guindon	5,893	30.5
Independent Liberal	William Joseph Major	5,321	27.6
Co-operative Commonwealth	François Bosse	280	1.5
Total valid votes		19,294	100.0

== Students Vote results ==
=== Glengarry—Prescott—Russell ===
2019 Canadian federal election
Party	Candidate	Votes	%
Liberal	Francis Drouin	619	30.20
New Democratic	Konstantine Malakos	520	25.37
Conservative	Pierre Lemieux	452	22.05
Green	Marthe Lépine	208	10.15
Rhinoceros	Marc-Antoine Gagnier	116	5.66
People's	Jean-Jacques Desgranges	60	2.93
Independent	Daniel John Fey	41	2.00
Libertarian	Darcy Neal Donnelly	34	1.66
Total valid votes		2,050	100.0
Source: Student Vote Canada

== See also ==
- List of Canadian electoral districts
- Historical federal electoral districts of Canada
