= Glengarry—Prescott—Russell (provincial electoral district) =

Provincial electoral district in Ontario, Canada

Coordinates: 45.42°N 75.13°W

Ontario electoral district
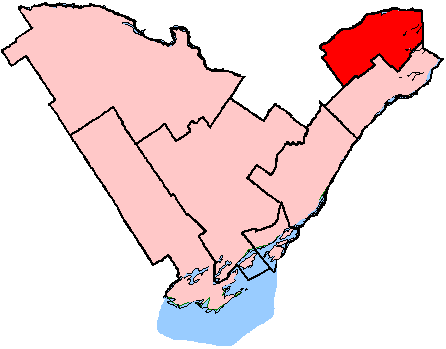
- Glengarry—Prescott—Russell in relation to other eastern Ontario electoral districts

Provincial electoral district
- Legislature: Legislative Assembly of Ontario
MPP
Stéphane Sarrazin
Progressive Conservative
- District created: 1996
- First contested: 1999
- Last contested: 2025

Demographics
- Population (2021): 116,463
- Electors (2025): 98,903
- Area (km²): 2,979
- Pop. density (per km²): 39.1
- Census division(s): Ottawa, Prescott and Russell United Counties, United Counties of Stormont, Dundas and Glengarry
- Census subdivision(s): Clarence-Rockland, Russell, Alfred and Plantagenet, the Nation, Casselman, Hawkesbury, Champlain, North Glengarry, South Glengarry, Ottawa

Glengarry—Prescott—Russell is a provincial electoral district in eastern Ontario, Canada. It elects one member to the Legislative Assembly of Ontario. It was created in 1996 from parts of Prescott and Russell and Stormont—Dundas—Glengarry and East Grenville when ridings were redistributed to match their federal counterparts.

From 1996 to 2005 the riding included the municipalities of Clarence-Rockland, Township of Russell, Alfred and Plantagenet, the Nation, Casselman, Hawkesbury, Champlain, North Glengarry and the eastern half of South Glengarry plus that part of Ottawa located in the former municipality of Cumberland, Ontario except for that part of Cumberland north of Innes Road and west of Trim Road.

In 2005, the riding lost the eastern half of South Glengarry and it also lost that part of the riding between Innes Road and Wall Road west of Trim Road.

Glengarry—Prescott—Russell is a francophone-majority riding.

== Members of Provincial Parliament ==
Glengarry—Prescott—Russell
Assembly	Years	Member	Party
Riding created from Prescott and Russell and Stormont—Dundas—Glengarry and East Grenville
37th	1999–2003	Jean-Marc Lalonde	Liberal
38th	2003–2007	Jean-Marc Lalonde	Liberal
39th	2007–2011	Jean-Marc Lalonde	Liberal
40th	2011–2014	Grant Crack	Liberal
41st	2014–2018	Grant Crack	Liberal
42nd	2018–2018	Amanda Simard	Progressive Conservative
42nd	2018–2020	Amanda Simard	Independent
42nd	2020–2022	Amanda Simard	Liberal
43rd	2022–2025	Stéphane Sarrazin	Progressive Conservative
44th	2025–present	Stéphane Sarrazin	Progressive Conservative

== Election results ==
Winning party in each polling division of Glengarry—Prescott—Russell at the 2025 Ontario general election

2025 Ontario general election
Party	Candidate	Votes	%	±%
Progressive Conservative	Stéphane Sarrazin	24,618	51.70	+9.65
Liberal	Trevor Stewart	17,752	37.28	–2.22
New Democratic	Ryder Finlay	2,384	5.01	–3.53
Green	Thaila Riden	1,089	2.29	–1.47
New Blue	Felix Labrosse	971	2.04	–2.30
Ontario Party	Brandon Wallingford	800	1.68	–0.14
Independent	Jason St-Louis	321	0.7	N/A
Total valid votes		47,835	99.27	+0.03
Total rejected, unmarked and declined ballots		352	0.73	–0.03
Turnout		48,187	48.72	+3.16
Eligible voters		98,903		
Progressive Conservative hold		Swing		+5.94
Source: Elections Ontario

Winning party in each polling division of Glengarry—Prescott—Russell at the 2022 Ontario general election

2022 Ontario general election
Party	Candidate	Votes	%	±%	Expenditures
Progressive Conservative	Stéphane Sarrazin	18,661	42.05	+1.07	$69,233
Liberal	Amanda Simard	17,529	39.50	+7.85	$51,459
New Democratic	Alicia Eglin	3,789	8.54	−13.25	$804
New Blue	Victor Brassard	1,924	4.34		$33,413
Green	Thaila Riden	1,670	3.76	+0.83	$1,098
Ontario Party	Stéphane Aubry	809	1.82	+0.27	$0
Total valid votes/expense limit		44,382	99.24	+0.56	$137,417
Total rejected, unmarked, and declined ballots		342	0.76	-0.56	
Turnout		44,724	45.56	-9.86	
Eligible voters		97,622			
Progressive Conservative gain from Liberal		Swing		−3.39	
Source(s): "Summary of Valid Votes Cast for Each Candidate" (PDF). Elections Ontario. 2022. Archived from the original on May 18, 2023.; "Statistical Summary by Electoral District" (PDF). Elections Ontario. 2022. Archived from the original on May 21, 2023.

2018 Ontario general election
Party	Candidate	Votes	%	±%
Progressive Conservative	Amanda Simard	19,952	40.98	+8.41
Liberal	Pierre Leroux	15,409	31.65	-18.03
New Democratic	Bonnie Jean-Louis	10,610	21.79	+9.29
Green	Daniel Bruce Reid	1,427	2.93	-0.28
Ontario Party	Joël Charbonneau	755	1.55	
Libertarian	Darcy Neal Donnelly	537	1.10	
Total valid votes		48,690	98.68	
Total rejected, unmarked and declined ballots		651	1.32	
Turnout		49,341	55.42	
Eligible voters		89,035		
Progressive Conservative notional gain from Liberal		Swing		+13.22
Source: Elections Ontario

2014 general election redistributed results
Party	Vote	%
Liberal	22,457	49.68
Progressive Conservative	14,724	32.57
New Democratic	5,653	12.51
Green	1,453	3.21
Others	918	2.03

2014 Ontario general election
Party	Candidate	Votes	%	±%
Liberal	Grant Crack	23,565	49.74	+6.56
Progressive Conservative	Roxane Villeneuve Robertson	15,429	32.57	−7.19
New Democratic	Isabelle Sabourin	5,902	12.46	−1.88
Green	Raymond St. Martin	1,528	3.23	+1.31
Libertarian	Darcy Neal Donnelly	422	0.89	+0.39
Independent	Marc-Antoine Gagnier	296	0.62	–
Freedom	Carl Leduc	233	0.49	+0.08
Total valid votes		47,375	100.0	+17.74
Liberal hold		Swing		+6.88
Source(s) Elections Ontario (2014). "Official result from the records – 026, Glengarry—Prescott—Russell" (PDF).

2011 Ontario general election
Party	Candidate	Votes	%	±%	Expenditures
Liberal	Grant Crack	17,345	43.18	−17.33	$ 59,831.34
Progressive Conservative	Marilissa Gosselin	15,973	39.76	+12.60	59,115.64
New Democratic	Bonnie Jean-Louis	5,721	14.24	+8.57	4,615.13
Green	Taylor Howarth	770	1.92	−3.91	250.88
Libertarian	Phil Miller	199	0.50		0.00
Freedom	Carl Leduc	164	0.41		0.00
Total valid votes / expense limit		40,172	100.0	−0.15	$ 100,656.15
Total rejected, unmarked and declined ballots		269	0.67	+0.02	
Turnout		40,441	47.81	−4.99	
Eligible voters		84,584		+10.27	
Liberal hold		Swing		−14.97	
Source(s) "Official return from the records / Rapport des registres officiels - Glengarry—Prescott—Russell" (PDF). Elections Ontario. "2011 Candidate Campaign Returns (CR-1)".

2007 Ontario general election
Party	Candidate	Votes	%	±%	Expenditures
Liberal	Jean-Marc Lalonde	24,345	60.51	−5.46	$ 54,480.27
Progressive Conservative	Denis Pommainville	10,927	27.16	+2.28	50,740.94
Green	Karolyne Pickett	2,344	5.83	+2.47	3,894.85
New Democratic	Josée Blanchette	2,281	5.67	−0.13	2,947.31
Family Coalition	Vicki Gunn	337	0.84		0.00
Total valid votes/expense limit		40,234	100.0	−8.33	$ 82,841.40
Total rejected ballots		263	0.65	−0.22	
Turnout		40,497	52.80	−4.80	
Eligible voters		76,705		−0.20	
Source(s) "Summary of Valid Votes Cast for Each Candidate – October 10, 2007 General Election" (PDF). "Statistical Summary – General Election 2007" (PDF). Elections Ontario. "2007 Candidate Campaign Returns (CR-1)".

2003 Ontario general election
Party	Candidate	Votes	%	±%	Expenditures
Liberal	Jean-Marc Lalonde	28,956	65.97	+10.59	$ 56,674.18
Progressive Conservative	Albert Bourdeau	10,921	24.88	−14.26	55,702.93
New Democratic	Guy Belle-Isle	2,544	5.80	+1.28	3,885.05
Green	Louise Pattington	1,471	3.35		1,726.57
Total valid votes/expense limit		43,892	100.0	−1.06	$ 73,787.52
Total rejected ballots		383	0.87	−0.16	
Turnout		44,275	57.60	−2.65	
Eligible voters		76,862		+3.31	
Source(s) "General Election of October 2, 2003 – Summary of Valid Ballots by Candidate". Elections Ontario. "General Election of October 2, 2003 – Statistical Summary". "2003 Candidate and Constituency Associations – Candidate Campaign Return (CR-1)".

1999 Ontario general election
Party	Candidate	Votes	%	Expenditures
Liberal	Jean-Marc Lalonde	24,568	55.38	$ 50,867.45
Progressive Conservative	Alain Lalonde	17,364	39.14	69,298.00
New Democratic	Stéphane Landry	2,007	4.52	9,669.52
Natural Law	Mary Glasser	425	0.96	0.00
Total valid votes/expense limit		44,364	100.0	$ 71,424.96
Total rejected ballots		460	1.03	
Turnout		44,824	60.25	
Eligible voters		74,401		
Source(s) "General Election of June 3 1999 – Summary of Valid Ballots by Candidate". Elections Ontario. "General Election of June 3 1999 – Statistical Summary". "1999 Candidate and Constituency Associations – Candidate Campaign Return (CR-1)".

== 2007 electoral reform referendum ==
2007 Ontario electoral reform referendum
Side	Votes	%
First Past the Post	28,549	73.8
Mixed Member Proportional	10,108	26.2
Total valid votes	38,657	100.0

== See also ==
- List of Ontario provincial electoral districts
- Canadian provincial electoral districts
