= Green Party of Canada candidates in the 2004 Canadian federal election =

The Green Party of Canada ran a full slate of 308 candidates in the 2004 federal election. Some of these candidates have separate biography pages; relevant information about other candidates may be found here.

The candidates are listed by province and riding name.

== Newfoundland and Labrador ==
=== Don Ferguson (Avalon) ===
Don C. C. Ferguson previously ran in the 1988 Canadian federal election as a candidate for the New Democratic Party, and finished third with 4,489 votes behind Blaine Thacker of the Progressive Conservative Party of Canada. In the 2000 Canadian federal election he ran for the Greens and finished fifth with 944 votes behind Rick Casson of the Canadian Alliance. Mr. Ferguson is a professor.

=== Lori-Ann Martino (Labrador) ===
Lori-Ann Martino lost to Lawrence D. O'Brien of the Liberal Party of Canada. Martino received 178 votes to O'Brien's 5,524. Martino was an organizer for the Green Party of Canada in Newfoundland and Labrador between March 2004 and June 2005. She also served as Jason Crummey's registered agent during the 2005 Labrador by-election.

Martino went on maternity leave from her job in June 2005. Six months later, after being asked to volunteer as an organizer on the ground, assisting the hired organizer living in PEI, Martino publicly resigned from the Green Party of Canada. She did so after the Green Party leader Jim Harris travelled to St. John's on the eve of a federal election, calling for a ban on subsidies to the "barbaric commercial seal slaughter".

Given that Martino was the publicly recognized representative of the Green Party in Newfoundland and Labrador, it was important that she have her opposition to the Leader's action recognized and heard. The Green Party reacted by claiming Martino was not the paid organizer at that time.

Green Party members passed a resolution at an Alberta convention in August 2004 calling for a phasing out of the harp and hooded commercial seal hunt. No members of the Newfoundland and Labrador wing of the Green Party were present at this convention, nor were they made aware that the resolution would be debated.

Martino ran as a Liberal party candidate in the 2007 provincial election and placed last in St. John's Centre. She lost to Shawn Skinner (PC), receiving 374 votes to Skinner's 3,332.

=== Justin Dollimont (Random—Burin—St. George's) ===
Justin Dollimont received a Bachelor of Science degree in environmental science from Acadia University in Wolfville, Nova Scotia, and an Advanced Diploma in Marine Geomatics from the Centre of Geographic Sciences in Lawrencetown, Nova Scotia. He two months in Costa Rica in 2000, preserving a watershed of rivers under the sponsorship of Canada World Youth and the Conservation Corps of Newfoundland and Labrador. Dollimont worked with an Environmental Consulting Firm at Mount Pearl, Newfoundland and Labrador. He has also done environmental surveys in the Gulf of Mexico. Dollimont supports the legalization of marijuana. He was 26 years old at the time of the election. Dollimont received 474 votes, finishing fourth.vThe winning candidate was Bill Matthews of the Liberal Party of Canada.

=== Scott Vokey (St. John's North) ===
Scott Vokey was a former Policy Coordinator for the Green Party of Ontario. Vokey was not a resident of the riding at the time of the election, although he was raised in St. John's. He received 791 votes, the most of any Green Party of Canada candidate in Newfoundland and Labrador; he lost to Norman E. Doyle of the Conservative Party of Canada.

== Nova Scotia ==
=== Chris Milburn (Sydney—Victoria) ===
Chris Milburn received 855 votes, finishing fourth against Liberal incumbent Mark Eyking.

=== Michael G. Oddy (Halifax) ===
Michael Oddy came in fourth, with 2,081 votes. He to Alexa McDonough of the New Democratic Party.

Oddy had previously run in the same riding in the 2000 Canadian federal election. He came sixth, with 587 votes.

== Quebec ==
=== Louise Martineau (Brome—Missisquoi) ===
Louise Martineau received 2,011 votes (4.55%), finishing fourth against Liberal incumbent Denis Paradis.

=== Jean-Pierre Bonenfant (Richelieu) ===
Jean-Pierre Bonenfant identified as a clerk and sales representative in 2004. He was a resident of Montreal and agreed to run as a parachute candidate in Richelieu when the Green Party did not nominate a local candidate. He had previously been a candidate of the Green Party of Quebec in a provincial election.

Electoral record
Election	Division	Party	Votes	%	Place	Winner
1989 provincial	Hochelaga-Maisonneuve	Green	685	2.97	3/10	Louise Harel, Parti Québécois
2004 federal	Richelieu	Green	839	1.72	5/6	Louis Plamondon, Bloc Québécois

== Ontario ==
=== Brampton—Springdale: Nick Hudson ===
Nick Hudson has a certificate in Broadcast Sales and Marketing from Humber College. He worked as a materials supervisor in Vaughan at the time of the election, and was studying part-time for a Bachelor of Arts degree in administrative studies from York University. Hudson received 1,927 votes (4.74%). He finished fourth, losing against Liberal candidate Ruby Dhalla.

=== Brampton West: Sanjeev Goel ===
Sanjeev Goel was born in Montreal, and graduated from the University of Toronto's medical school in 1995. He is a medical doctor and family physician. Goel practices in Brampton at "A Healing Place", a three-story Victorian house that he manages with his wife. Goel practices Chelation Therapy. He has an interest in meditation and nutritional supplements. Goel is a member of a non-violent social action group called TruthForce, and co-manages the site www.truthforce.ca. He has cited the Mahatma Gandhi as a personal inspiration. Goel opposed the 2003 invasion of Iraq, and joined the Green Party as a result of this controversy.. He also opposes "public-private partnerships" in health care. Goel focused on electoral reform and environment issues. He received 1,603 votes, finishing fourth in a field of five candidates. The winner was Colleen Beaumier of the Liberal Party of Canada.

Previous candidacies:

- 2003 Ontario provincial election: received 820 votes (2.14%) in Brampton Centre as a candidate of the Green Party of Ontario (winning candidate: Linda Jeffrey, Liberal)

=== Carleton—Lanark: Stuart Langstaff ===
Stuart Langstaff holds a bachelor's degree in engineering physics. He has 17 years experience high-tech sector, where he has specialized in electronic and optical hardware design. At the time of the 2004 election, Langstaff was planning to enter a Bachelor of Education program at the University of Ottawa to teach high school science and mathematics. He owns an organic farm in Pakenham, and has served on the Environmental Advisory and Plasma Arc Committees of Mississippi Mills. Langstaff campaigned for the Pakenham seat on the Mississippi Mills council in 2003, and lost by 57 votes. He was 42 years old in 2004.

Langstaff is a frequent candidate for the Green Party, having campaigned under its banner in 1997, 2000 and 2004. He was also a candidate of the Green Party of Ontario in 1999. He has rejected the view that the Green Party is left-wing, and has argued that it does not fit into the traditional "left-right" spectrum (Ottawa Citizen, 30 April 2004).

Electoral record
Election	Division	Party	Votes	%	Place	Winner
1997 federal	Ottawa West—Nepean	Green	416		5/8	Marlene Catterall, Liberal
1999 provincial	Lanark—Carleton	Green	681		5/6	Norm Sterling, Progressive Conservative
2000 federal	Lanark—Carleton	Green	871	1.37	5/8	Scott Reid, Canadian Alliance
2004 federal	Carleton—Lanark	Green	3,665		4/4	Gordon O'Connor, Conservative

=== Davenport: Mark O'Brien ===
Mark O'Brien teaches English as a Second Language at York University in Toronto. He has worked extensively with Toronto's Latin American population. O'Brien has a degree in linguistics. He also works professionally as a folk musician in the Andean tradition. O'Brien received 1,384 votes, finishing fourth. The winning candidate was Mario Silva of the Liberal Party of Canada.

Previous candidacies:

- 2000 federal election: received 642 votes in Davenport (winning candidate: Charles Caccia, Liberal)
- 2003 Ontario provincial election: received 1,741 votes in Davenport as a candidate of the Green Party of Ontario (winning candidate: Tony Ruprecht, Liberal)

=== Don Valley East: Dan King ===
Dan King is an environmental and social policy consultant in Toronto, Ontario. While King is originally from Timmins, Ontario, he has lived in various places (including New York City and Amsterdam) in the 1960s and 1970s. He lived in Rochdale College in Toronto, a building which was later converted to apartments and in which he still lives over 30 years later. King has served as tenant rep in a building in which he has to campaign in many languages just in one hallway. He is very involved in local causes for immigrants, the disabled, mentally ill and disadvantaged. King is an expert in Canada's tax system and files tax returns for disabled people.

King has also been a perennial candidate, staffer and fundraiser for the Green Party of Ontario. He recruited and trained numerous candidates and staff for the GPO and, as of December 2005, serves as its Operations Coordinator. He has volunteered to run in ridings where the party has poor organization, for instance, he did not actually campaign in Kenora—Rainy River during the 2003 Ontario election because of financial constraints covering such a huge remote riding. He is an advocate of Northern Ontario issues, and believes it must also have separate province status, equivalent to the status he seeks for Toronto.

Previous candidacies:

- 1990 Ontario provincial election: received 1,340 votes in Eglinton as a candidate of the Green Party of Ontario (winning candidate: Dianne Poole, Liberal)
- 1993 federal election: received 302 votes in Don Valley West (winning candidate: John Godfrey, Liberal)
- 1995 Ontario provincial election: received 395 votes in Eglinton as a candidate of the Green Party of Ontario (winning candidate: Bill Saunderson, Progressive Conservative)
- 1997 federal election: received 378 votes in Don Valley West (winning candidate: John Godfrey, Liberal)
- 2003 Ontario provincial election: received 395 votes in Kenora—Rainy River as a candidate of the Green Party of Ontario (winning candidate: Howard Hampton, New Democratic Party)
- 2007 Ontario provincial election: running in Trinity—Spadina as a candidate of the Green Party of Ontario

=== Etobicoke North: Mir Kamal ===
Born in Hyderabad, India. A legal and immigration consultant in Toronto. Has worked outside of Canada as a lawyer and lecturer. Received 605 votes, finishing fifth in a field of seven candidates. The winner was Roy Cullen of the Liberal Party of Canada.

Previous candidacies:

- 2003 Ontario provincial election: received 503 votes in Etobicoke North as a candidate of the Green Party of Ontario (winning candidate: Shafiq Qaadri, Liberal)

=== Haliburton—Kawartha Lakes—Brock: Tim Holland ===
Tim Holland was born in Guelph, Ontario, in 1974. He has a Bachelor of Arts degree in political science from Trent University and is an accomplished professional entertainer, performing nationally and internationally under the name "Foolesque." He has also been an activist with organizations such as the Ontario Public Interest Research Group (OPIRG). He joined the Green Party in 1999 and has been a Green candidate in two federal elections and one provincial election.

Holland represented the Green Party at the 2003 Peterborough Pride Parade and indicated his support for same-sex marriage. He opposed election finance reforms introduced by the government of Jean Chrétien in 2003, arguing that people should be allowed to donate as much to political parties as they choose. In 2004, he described the Green Party as the most economically conservative electoral option and said he wanted to work toward Canada becoming debt-free.

Holland was the campaign manager for Green Party candidate Brent Wood in the 2006 federal election.

Electoral record
Election	Division	Party	Votes	%	Place	Winner
2000 federal	Peterborough	Green	903	1.73	5/6	Peter Adams, Liberal
2003 provincial	Peterborough	Green	1,605	2.92	4/6	Jeff Leal, Liberal
2004 federal	Haliburton—Kawartha Lakes—Brock	Green	2,637	4.72	4/6	Barry Devolin, Conservative

=== Hamilton Mountain: Jo Pavlov ===
Jo Pavlov is a computer technician. She worked for the Hamilton-Wentworth District School Board at the time of the election. Pavlov was 32 years old in 2004. While a high school student, she had a co-op placement in Sheila Copps's constituency office.

Pavlov is an advocate for A Better Way To Live. She is also member of the childfree movement, which argues that people without children are more likely to pursue environmentally friendly lifestyles. Pavlov received 1,378 votes, finishing fourth in a field of five candidates. The winner was Beth Phinney of the Liberal Party of Canada.

Pavlov made the following comment in the 2003 Ontario election: "Forget what you think you know about the Green Party. This isn’t a party of Birkenstock-wearing tree-huggers – those old stereotypes are a thing of the past."

Previous candidacies:

- 2003 Ontario provincial election: received 727 votes in Hamilton West as a candidate of the Green Party of Ontario (winning candidate: Judy Marsales, Liberal)

=== Hamilton West: Anne Marie Pavlov ===
Anne Marie Pavlov is a bank portfolio administrator in Hamilton. She is also a singer and guitarist. During the mid-1990s, Pavlov wrote about the difficulties that women sometimes have in being taken seriously as musicians (Hamilton Spectator, 10 April 1995). She was active in protests against the Red Hill Expressway, a project which many environmentalists in Hamilton regard as ecologically unsound (Spectator, 21 June 2004).

Pavlov's sister, Jo Pavlov, has also campaigned for the Green Party (Spectator, 29 June 2004).

Pavlov received 1,422 votes (3.21%), finishing fourth against New Democrat David Christopherson.

=== Kingston and the Islands: Janina Fisher Balfour ===
Janina Fisher Balfour was born in Toronto and raised in Jamaica. She moved to Washington, D.C., when she was 24, after being recruited by the World Bank. Balfour later studied science and anthropology at McGill University in Montreal. Since the 1980s, she has been a self-employed "success coach, international speaker and workshop facilitator".

Balfour moved to Kingston, Ontario in 1999. She was 48 years old at the time of the 2004 election (Kingston Whig-Standard, 26 June 2004). Balfour was chosen as the GPC nominee over Queen's University professor George Clark, and finished fourth against Liberal incumbent Peter Milliken with 3,339 votes (6.13%), one of the strongest showings for the Green Party in Ontario.

=== Kitchener—Waterloo: Pauline Richards ===
Pauline Richards was 52 years old at the time of the election. She was resident of Waterloo for 24 years prior to the election. Richards manages a small manufacturing plant, and leads a tri-city peer counselling network. She teaches peer counselling to adults. Richards is founding member of the Seven Generations Network, and a member of the Laurel Creek Citizens' Committee. She manages the books for Kitchener-Waterloo Fair Trade Coffee. Richards sings with the Raging Grannies. She received 3,277 votes, finishing fourth in a field of six candidates. The winner was Andrew Telegdi of the Liberal Party of Canada.

Previous candidacies:

- 2003 Ontario provincial election: received 1,774 votes in Kitchener—Waterloo as a candidate of the Green Party of Ontario (winning candidate: Elizabeth Witmer, Progressive Conservative)

=== Lanark—Frontenac—Lennox and Addington: John Baranyi ===
John Baranyi was born in 1961 in Elliot Lake, Ontario. He enrolled at McMaster University in 1980 in the engineering program, and left the following year to join the Canada World Youth Exchange Program (Newfoundland/Indonesia), 1981–1982. Baranyi lived in a small village in northern Sumatra for three months, where he was troubled by the local practices of Shell Oil and the effects of industrial capitalism on traditional communities. He later joined the non-government organization Plenty Canada, promoting soy production and nutritional projects in the Caribbean. Over the years, Baranyi has worked as a tree planter and carpenter, and has renovated his 100-year-old farmhouse to increase its energy efficiency. With his wife, he owns the vegetarian food company Pulse Foods. Baranyi was 42 years old in 2004 (Ottawa Citizen, 2 June 2004).

Baranyi campaigned for the House of Commons as an independent candidate in the 2000 election, and ran for the Green Party of Ontario in 2003. In the latter campaign, he opposed a proposed Ottawa River boat bypass around Chats Dam (Ottawa Citizen, 12 September 2003). He received 2,736 votes (4.84%) in 2004, finishing fourth against Conservative candidate Scott Reid.

Previous candidacies:

- 2000 federal election, received 150 votes in Lanark—Carleton as an independent candidate (winning candidate: Scott Reid, Canadian Alliance)
- 2003 Ontario provincial election, received 2,564 votes in Lanark—Carleton for a credible fourth-place finish, as a candidate of the Green Party of Ontario (winning candidate: Norm Sterling, Progressive Conservative)

=== London North Centre: Bronagh Joyce Morgan ===
Bronagh Joyce Morgan was born in Niagara Falls, Ontario. He has academic degrees from Trent University and Queen's University. Morgan operates a legal research company. He also has several certifications from sports/fitness groups around the country, and is a personal trainer at Goodlife Fitness. Morgan is a folk musician, and has exhibited artworks at the London Fringe Festival. He supports same-sex marriage. He received 2,376 votes, finishing fourth in a field of six candidates. The winner was Joe Fontana of the Liberal Party of Canada.

Previous candidacies:

- 2003 Ontario provincial election, received 780 votes in London North Centre as a candidate of the Green Party of Ontario (winning candidate: Deb Matthews, Liberal)

=== Mississauga—Brampton South: Paul Simas ===
Paul Simas was born in Brazil, and moved to Canada in 1989 as a teenager. He was a naval reservist in the 1990s, and is currently a naval officer involved in the Canadian Forces Cadet Movement. Simas is sfounding member of Brasilnet, supporting Brazilian professionals and promoting diversity within Canada. He works as a Chief Flight Attendant (Purser), and was a prominent member of the Canadian Airlines Employees Charitable Foundation. Simas is also a computer-animated drafting technologist, and the operations coordinator of the Green Party of Ontario. His father, Paulo Simas (Sr.), was also a member of the GPO executive. Simas was working toward a Bachelor of Arts degree in anthropology at the time of the election. He has formally presented green policies initiatives to Mississauga mayor Hazel McCallion. Has criticized former leader Joan Russow for leaving the Green Party in favour of the NDP. He received 1,525 votes, finishing fourth in a field of five candidates. The winner was Navdeep Bains of the Liberal Party of Canada. Received 3,888 votes in the 2007 Ontario General elections, reaching third place and 10.6% of the votes.

Previous candidacies:

- 2003 Ontario provincial election: received 811 votes (1.29%) in Brampton West—Mississauga as a candidate of the Green Party of Ontario, finishing fifth out of six candidates (winning candidate: Vic Dhillon, Liberal)

=== Nepean—Carleton: Chris Paul Walker ===
Chris Paul Walker was born in Oakville, Ontario. He moved to Kingston for service in the naval reserve, and graduated from Queen's University in 1985 with a Bachelor of Arts degree in psychology. Walker worked for a development company in Toronto for four years, and returned to Kingston in 1993 to work as a home renovator and renewable energy consultant (Kingston Whig-Standard, 10 May 1997). He was 42 years old in 2004.

Walker is a frequent candidate for the GPC and the provincial Green Party of Ontario. He ran an entirely solo campaign in the 1997 federal election, working without a riding association or election scrutineers. After the election, he helped to build a Green Party association in Kingston (KWS, 3 June 1997).

Walker was not a candidate in the 2006 election, but is the nominated candidate for the 40th Canadian federal election in the nearby riding of Lanark—Frontenac—Lennox and Addington.

Electoral record
Election	Division	Party	Votes	%	Place	Winner
1997 federal	Kingston and the Islands	Green	902	1.74	5/6	Peter Milliken, Liberal
1999 provincial	Kingston and the Islands	Green	1,174		4/6	John Gerretsen, Liberal
2000 federal	Hastings—Frontenac—Lennox and Addington	Green	516		5/8	Larry McCormick, Liberal
2003 provincial	Renfrew—Nipissing—Pembroke	Green	671		4/4	John Yakabuski, Progressive Conservative
2004 federal	Nepean—Carleton	Green	2,886		4/5	Pierre Poilievre, Conservative

=== Niagara West—Glanbrook: Tom Ferguson ===
Tom Ferguson was born in the Niagara region. He was educated at Brock University, the University of Guelph and York University. Ferguson has a Master of Arts degree in political science. He was 53 years old at the time of the election. Ferguson is the owner of Niagara Custom Homes. He is a member of the Town of Lincoln's Municipal Heritage Committee. He was a Progressive Conservative in the 1970s, and became a founding member of the Green Party in 1983. Ferguson was a policy advisor to the Green Party of Ontario in the late 1980s. He received 1,761 votes, finishing fourth in a field of six candidates. The winner was Dean Allison of the Conservative Party of Canada.

Previous candidacies:

- 1984 federal election, received 365 votes in St. Catharines (winning candidate: Joe Reid, finishing fourth of seven candidates Progressive Conservative)
- 2003 Ontario provincial election, received 713 votes in Erie—Lincoln as a candidate of the Green Party of Ontario, finishing fourth out of five candidates (winning candidate: Tim Hudak, Progressive Conservative)

=== Ottawa Centre: David Chernushenko ===
David Chernushenko received an endorsement from the Ottawa Citizen, and won 4,730 votes for a strong fourth-place finish. The winning candidate was Ed Broadbent of the New Democratic Party.

Chernushenko later became deputy leader of the GPC. See his biography page for more details.

=== Ottawa—Vanier: Raphael Thierrin ===
Raphael Thierrin has two master's degrees: one in environmental science from the University of Calgary, the other in library and information science from the University of Western Ontario. He has worked as records manager for the Alberta Ministry of the Environment. During the 1990s, Thierrin worked as a sustainable agriculture consultant. He has also worked with Canadian Organic Growers, and has been associated with Franco-Albertan organizations. Thierrin has published articles on numerous subjects. In 2001, he was arrested and detained for taking part in that year's FTAA protests.

He received 3,628 votes (6.9%) for a fourth-place finish. The winner was Mauril Belanger of the Liberal Party of Canada.

On May 11, 2005, he received the Green Party nomination for Ottawa—Vanier for the next federal election.

Previous candidacies:

- 2003 Ontario provincial election, received 1,876 votes (4.53%) in Ottawa—Vanier as a candidate of the Green Party of Ontario (winning candidate: Madeleine Meilleur, Liberal)

=== Ottawa West—Nepean: Neil Adair ===
Neil Adair received 2,748 votes (4.79%), finishing fourth against Liberal Marlene Catterall. See his entry here for more information.

=== Prince Edward—Hastings: Tom Lawson ===
Tom Lawson has a Bachelor of Arts degree in history from the University of Toronto, and a Master of Arts degree in English from the Cambridge University in England. He taught at Trinity College School fre om 1955 to 1988, and was head of the English Department for 15 years. Lawson now leads an annual 12-week course for families coping with mental illness. In 1995, hled his local community to reject a government proposal which would have brought radioactive and toxic waste into the region. Received 2,130 votes, finishing fourth. The winning candidate was Daryl Kramp of the Conservative Party of Canada.

Previous candidacies:

- 1999 Ontario provincial election: received 1,194 votes in Northumberland for a fourth-place finish, as a candidate of the Green Party of Ontario (winning candidate: Doug Galt, Progressive Conservative)
- 2000 federal election: received 1,102 votes in Northumberland for a fifth-place finish (winning candidate: Paul Macklin, Liberal)

=== Scarborough Centre: Greg Bonser ===
Greg Bonser was active in the Green Party of Ontario from 1996 to 2003. He served on the provincial council for two terms, and as the operations coordinator for one term. During that time, Bonser was the creator of what was later called the Bonser Method, a meeting operations and voting protocol developed to develop policy at face to face meetings. This system is still in use today by the Green Party of Ontario as well as the national party and other provincial Green parties.

Bonser has run in numerous elections, most notably for the Toronto City Council in 2003 in Ward 30, for the seat vacated by Jack Layton. Bonser ran against John Cannis in the 2004 Federal election. He placed 4th, receiving 1,045 votes.

=== Scarborough Southwest: Peter Van Dalen ===
Peter Van Dalen was 36 years of age at the time of the election, and had been running a concierge service in Toronto for five years. He joined the Green Party in 2001, having previously been a member of the Progressive Conservative Party in St. Paul's. Van Dalen has promoted solar and wind energy.

Van Dalen received 1,520 votes (4.00%) in the 2004 election, finishing fourth against Liberal incumbent Tom Wappel. He has been nominated again as the Green Party candidate for Scarborough Southwest in the 39th Canadian federal election.

=== St. Catharines: Jim Fannon ===
Jim Fannon received 1,927 votes (3.66%), finishing fourth against Liberal incumbent Walt Lastewka.

=== Sudbury: Luke Norton ===
Luke Norton was born and raised in Falconbridge, near Sudbury. He first ran for public office as a candidate of the Green Party of Ontario in the 2003 provincial election, at age 24. Norton had previously attended Cambrian College's Computer Systems Technology program, and was studying history at Laurentian University. During this campaign, he called for Sudbury to pursue cleaner mining technology, and market its research around the world.

Norton ran for the federal Green Party in 2004. He broke with his party's official party by indicating that he did not support the legalization of cannabis, citing his own bad experiences with the drug. Norton later became president of the Laurentian University Students' General Association. He helped to organize a mock funeral marking the "death of affordable education" in January 2007, after the provincial government of Dalton McGuinty lifted a freeze on tuition rates.

Electoral record
Election	Division	Party	Votes	%	Place	Winner
2003 provincial	Sudbury	Green	1,009	2.83	4/4	Rick Bartolucci, Liberal
2004 federal	Sudbury	Green	1,999	4.67	4/5	Diane Marleau, Liberal

=== Trinity—Spadina: Mark Viitala ===
Mark Viitala works at Rogers Media, and is also a longtime volunteer in community radio. He uses the stage name "DJ Skip". Formerly on the management board of CKLU-FM in Sudbury, Viitala also helped the station get its FM licence. He hosts a ska music program, and was the executive producer of Skanadian Club Volume 4. Viitala was the former manager of The Smokers; he also produced Package Deal, their first album. Viitala was raised in Northern Ontario, and is a vegetarian. He is the chair of the Greater Toronto Area chapter of the Sierra Club of Canada. Viitala was the GPC administration chair and Green Party of Ontario office manager from 1998 to 2000; he was also their GPO secretary in 2002–2003. Since 2003, he has represented Ontario on the GPC federal council. Viitala was the party advocate for issues of citizenship and culture. He supports the legalization of marijuana. Viitala apparently intended to run for the GPC in Don Valley East in the 2000 federal election, but did not appear on the ballot. He received 2,259 votes in 2004, finishing fourth in a field of eight candidates.

Previous candidacies:

- 2003 Ontario provincial election: received 1,236 votes in Eglinton—Lawrence for a fourth-place finish, as a candidate of the Green Party of Ontario (winning candidate: Mike Colle, Liberal)

=== Wellington—Halton Hills: Brent Bouteiller ===
Brent Bouteiller received 2,725 votes (5.43%), finishing fourth against Conservative candidate Michael Chong.

=== Whitby—Oshawa: Michael MacDonald ===
Michael MacDonald was 28 years old at the time of the election, and was a customer service professional. He had previously campaigned for the Green Party of Ontario in the 2003 provincial election, and finished fourth against Progressive Conservative Jim Flaherty with 1,375 votes.

He received 2,759 votes (4.85%) in the 2004 election, finishing fourth against Liberal incumbent Judi Longfield.

=== Windsor West: Rob Spring ===
Rob Spring was born in 1964 in Shelburne, Nova Scotia. He moved to Windsor in his youth, graduated from Essex District High School in 1982, and entered the workforce after his graduation. Spring served two years with the 21st Windsor Service Battalion as a reservist vehicle technician. He is an auto worker, and a veteran environmental activist in Windsor. Spring has served on the city's Environmental Advisory Committee, has been a member of the Citizens Environmental Alliance since 1985 (Windsor Star, 25 September 1998), and chaired the Canadian Auto Workers Local 444 environmental committee (Windsor Star, 22 October 1999). In 1998, he was part of a successful protest against the construction of a rock-crushing facility near a residential area (Windsor Star, 20 October 1998). He was also a member of Friends of Marshfield Woods in 2000, and unsuccessfully tried to prevent a logging operation in the area (Windsor Star, 17 January 2000).

Spring joined the Green Party in 2000, and worked as campaign manager for Green Party candidates Chris Holt and Cary M. Lucier in the 2003 provincial election (Windsor Star, 15 September 2003). He received 1,545 votes (3.50%) in the 2004 election, finishing fourth against New Democratic Party candidate Brian Masse.

== Manitoba ==
=== David Kattenburg (Brandon—Souris) ===
David Kattenburg is a radio documentary producer and science educator in Manitoba, Canada.

Kattenburg received a Bachelor of Science degree from McMaster University in 1975, and was awarded a Ph.D. in Medical Sciences in 1981. He subsequently worked as a journalist, instructor and environmental activist. Now residing in Winnipeg, Kattenburg is the owner and operator of Earth Chronicle Productions, which has created documentaries on issues relating to development and the environment. His series include The Earth Chronicles, More Than Just A Dozen, Children of the Earth, Partners in Action and ClimateWatch.

He received 1264 votes in 2004, or about 3.5% of the total cast.

=== Andrew Basham (Charleswood—St. James) ===
Andrew Basham received 880 votes (2.09%), finishing in fourth place against Conservative candidate Steven Fletcher.

=== C. David Nickarz (Churchill) ===
David Nickarz is a carpenter and environmental activist. He first became involved with the environmental movement in 1991, while attending the University of Manitoba. The following year, he unsuccessfully sought to prevent the capture of four beluga whales in Churchill, Manitoba, for sale to the Shedd aquarium in Chicago. Two of the whales later died in captivity, and the Canadian government passed a law banning future exports. No belugas have been captured in Churchill since 1992, due in part to the efforts of Nickarz and other protesters. Nickarz has also been active with the anti-whaling group Sea Shepherd Conservation Society, and has traveled to Antarctica, the Faroe Islands, the Galapagos Islands, Cape Flattery and the Gulf of St. Lawrence with the organization. He has emphasized that while he opposes commercial whaling, he is not against traditional whale-hunting among aboriginal societies.

He was arrested in 1993 for taking part in an anti-logging protest at Clayoquot Sound, British Columbia, and fined $1,500. The fee was paid by the Green Party of Canada. A newspaper report of the arrest lists him as 21 years old.

Shortly after the 2004 election, Nickarz organized a protest against the spraying of malathion in Winnipeg. City authorities argued that the spraying would reduce the city's mosquito population, although Nickarz and others believed it was ineffective and dangerous. David's father Jim Nickarz was arrested for protesting against malathion spraying the following year, and vowed to go on a hunger strike during his time in jail. The younger Nickarz was quoted as saying, "My father's of sound mind... he's very determined to see [the protest] through". In 2006, Nickarz joined with veteran Winnipeg activist Nick Ternette and others to form the Cancer Brigade, a group that argues malathion weakens the body's immune system and its ability to fight cancer.

He has campaigned for the federal and provincial Green Parties on three occasions.

Electoral record
Election	Division	Party	Votes	%	Place	Winner
1999 provincial	Concordia	Green	87	1.07	4/4	Gary Doer, New Democratic Party
2000 federal	Winnipeg—Transcona	Green	229	0.70	5/8	Bill Blaikie, New Democratic Party
2004 federal	Churchill	Green	612	3.09	4/4	Bev Desjarlais, New Democratic Party

=== Lindy Clubb (Dauphin—Swan River) ===
Lindy Clubb is a longtime resident of Winnipeg, and also owns a summer home in the Riding Mountain Escarpment. She is a freelance writer, researcher and editor, and has extensive experience in environmental advocacy in the region. She is the coordinator of the Mixedwood Forest Society, and is active in the international Erosion Control Association and Wolfe Creek Conservation. Clubb has also been involved in various activities with Manitoba's traditional Ojibway community. She is a supporter of family farms (as opposed to corporate farms), and is also a supporter of gun control.

The 2004 election was Clubb's first venture into electoral politics. She received 673 votes, about 2% of the total cast.

=== Elijah Gair (Elmwood—Transcona) ===
Elijah Gair was a security official during the election. His campaign centred on the need to find alternative energy sources, to replace forestry products and petroleum. According to his campaign literature, Gair supports a social model based on community and family instead of competition. He received 719 votes (2.46%), finishing fourth against New Democratic Party incumbent Bill Blaikie.

Gair was scheduled to be the Green Party's candidate for Winnipeg South in the 2006 federal election, but did not actually appear on the ballot.

=== Jacob Giesbrecht (Kildonan—St. Paul) ===
Jacob Giesbrecht is a lawyer and activist in Manitoba, Canada. Raised in rural Manitoba, Giesbrecht moved to Winnipeg in 1986 and has resided there since that time. He is a lawyer with the firm of Inkster Christie Hughes, specializing in estate, unemployment and labour law. Giesbrecht has also been involved in volunteer organizations, including a number of anti-poverty groups in Winnipeg's downtown core.

He received 756 votes, or about 2% of the total votes in the riding.

=== Marc Payette (Portage—Lisgar) ===
Marc Payette received 856 votes (2.46%), finishing fifth against Brian Pallister of the Conservative Party of Canada. See his entry here for more information.

=== Daniel Backé (St. Boniface) ===
Daniel Backé is a young politician with a history of social activism in Winnipeg. At age seven, he was involved in a program to assist juvenile delinquents with reading and writing skills (Ottawa Citizen, 12 January 1989).

At the time of the election, Backé was working towards the completion of his Bachelor of Arts degree at the University of Winnipeg, where he majored in political science and theatre.

The 2004 election was Backé's first as a candidate. He claimed that his priorities were Senate reform and the creation of federal subsidy for ecologically-sound methods of transportation. He received 925 votes (2.40%), finishing fourth against Liberal incumbent Raymond Simard.

=== Robin Faye (Winnipeg Centre) ===
Robin Faye is a businesswoman and activist in Manitoba, Canada. In the Canadian federal election of 2004, she ran as a candidate of the Green Party in the riding of Winnipeg Centre.

Raised in Toronto, Faye now works as a massage therapist in the Winnipeg area, and promotes natural health concerns. She is the owner of DragonFly Massage and the Vice-President of a feminist apartment co-op (where she herself lives). Faye has worked with Mediation Services, the Revenue Planning Committee of Shakespeare in the Ruins and the Winnipeg Folk Festival. In 2001, Faye's therapy massage centre was awarded SEED Winnipeg's Community Development Business Award. She herself is a member of the Community Development Business Association.

Faye joined the Green Party in 2000. In 2002, she temporarily moved from her home to a public campground to protest the spraying of malathion against insects in the Winnipeg area. (Faye herself was chemically-injured in 1978, and still suffers some health symptoms resulting from this event). Her campaign in 2004 focused on environmental and health concerns, with an emphasis on "re-creation of healthy human habitat". She received 1,151 votes, or 4.3% of the total votes cast in Winnipeg Centre.

=== Alon Weinberg (Winnipeg North) ===
Alon Weinberg is a young politician and activist. He was born in the West Kildonan section of Winnipeg, where his grandparents founded Miracle Bakery, a longtime north end institution. He has described himself as an environmental educator, and has taught fifth and sixth grade students about natural cycles. Weinberg is supporter of organic farming, and has an interest in holistic medicine. He protested against the use of malathion against insects after two dead crows were allegedly found to have West Nile disease, and the provincial government suspended buffer zones by declaring a health emergency. (National Post, 22 July 2002)

Weinberg has a Bachelor of Arts degree in philosophy from the University of Winnipeg. He has been a member of a Winnipeg organization called Jews for a Just Peace, which supports Palestinian self-determination and a two-state solution to end the Israeli-Palestinian conflict. He took part in a protest against former Israeli Prime Minister Binyamin Netanyahu's appearance in the city in 2002, arguing that Netanyahu "believes that more violence is a way to security".

As of 2006, Weinberg is studying Native Studies at the University of Manitoba. He remains interested in the Israeli-Palestinian dispute, and has called for "justice and peace and mutual recognition" between Israelis and Palestinians based on human rights.

He believes that ecoliteracy is key to transitioning from inefficient and unsustainable growth economics to localized and diversified smaller-scale economies. He has also identified biomimcry. a principle of design that replicates nature's cycles, as a powerful tool for humanity.

Electoral record
Election	Division	Party	Votes	%	Place	Winner
2003 provincial	St. Johns	Green	221	3.79	4/5	Gord Mackintosh, New Democratic Party
2004 federal	Winnipeg North	Green	531	2.04	4/6	Judy Wasylycia-Leis, New Democratic Party

External sources

- 2004 candidate's biography (cached)
- 2004 CBC Summary (halfway down the page)

=== Ron Cameron (Winnipeg South) ===
Ron Cameron was raised in Yorkton and Regina, in Saskatchewan. He trained as a policeman, and was in charge of the Royal Canadian Mounted Police Forensic Laboratory in Winnipeg from 1983 to 1989. Cameron moved to Vancouver after his retirement, but returned to Winnipeg in 1999. At the time of the 2004 election, he coached swimming and was a member of the Lifesaving Society.

Cameron's campaign focused on environmental issues, free education and a self-reliant economy. He received 1003 votes (2.67%), finishing fourth against Liberal cabinet minister Reg Alcock.

Cameron served as president of the Green Party of Manitoba in 2005, and appealed for Markus Buchart to remain as party leader after a period of division in the party. He resigned his position in support of Buchart in March 2005 (Winnipeg Free Press, 14 March 2005).

He has been nominated to run for the Green Party in Winnipeg South in the 39th Canadian federal election.

=== Ian Scott (Winnipeg South Centre) ===
Ian Scott was raised in the upscale River Heights section of Winnipeg. He has been involved in local community organizations such as Take Pride Winnipeg!, a group which seeks to increase civic responsibility. In 2003, Scott received the Young Civic Leader's Award from Kelvin High School.

Scott's campaign in 2004 focused primarily on environmental issues, including recycling and anti-idling campaigns. He received 1,508 votes, close to 4% of the total cast in the riding. his was the party's second-best showing in the city.

== Saskatchewan ==
=== David Greenfield (Saskatoon—Wanuskewin) ===
Born in 1967, David Greenfield is a veteran environmental activist, property manager, poet, singer and frequent candidate for public office (Saskatoon-Wanuskewin, 25 November 2000). He is an opponent of genetically modified foods, has participated in anti-nuclear protests in Saskatchewan, and helped establish a LETS bartering system. Greenfield has also participated in marches against the Free Trade Area of the Americas and the Group of Eight. He was thirty-two years old at the time of his first campaign, in 1999 (Saskatoon Star-Phoenix, 19 October 1999).

Greenfield has campaigned for both the Green Party of Canada and the Saskatchewan New Green Alliance. He was elected as Saskatchewan's representative to the Green Party executive in 2004.

Electoral record
Election	Division	Party	Votes	%	Place	Winner
1999 provincial	Saskatoon Meewasin	NGA	294		4/4	Carolyn Jones, New Democratic Party
federal by-election, 15 November 1999	Saskatoon—Rosetown—Biggar	Green	175		5/6	Dennis Gruending, New Democratic Party
2000 federal	Saskatoon—Wanuskewin	Green	402	1.21	5/5	Maurice Vellacott, Canadian Alliance
8 November 2001, provincial by-election	Saskatoon Idylwyld	NGA	68		4/5	David Forbes, New Democratic Party
2003 provincial	Saskatoon Meewasin	NGA	77		4/4	Frank Quennell, New Democratic Party
2004 federal	Saskatoon—Wanuskewin	Green	960	2.96	4/4	Maurice Vellacott, Conservative

== Alberta ==
=== George Read (Calgary Southeast) ===
George Read is the former leader of the Green Party of Alberta.

=== Darcy Kraus (Calgary Southwest) ===
Darcy Kraus was born in Calgary, and holds a Bachelor of Arts degree in political science from the University of Calgary. He was 30 at the time of the election, and was the Green Party's election campaign organizer for Alberta (Calgary Herald, 8 April 2004). Kraus worked in sales in private life, and was a radio programmer at CJSW 90.9 FM in Calgary (Calgary Herald, 27 June 2004 +

Kraus is a longtime personal friend of Alberta Greens leader George Read (Edmonton Journal, 31 October 2004); the latter ran for the Alberta Greens in the 2001 provincial election.

Electoral record
Election	Division	Party	Votes	%	Place	Winner
2001 provincial	Calgary-North Hill	Green	404		4/4	Richard Magnus, Progressive Conservative
2004 federal	Calgary Southwest	Green	3,210	6.22	3/6	Stephen Harper, Conservative
