= Natural Law Party of Canada candidates in the 2000 Canadian federal election =

The Natural Law Party of Canada fielded several candidates in the 2000 federal election, none of whom were elected. Information about these candidates may be found here.

== Quebec (incomplete) ==
Riding	Candidate's Name	Notes	Gender	Residence	Occupation	Votes	%	Rank
Gatineau	Jean-Claude Pommet	Pommet was one of the Natural Law Party's "yogic flyers." In 1999, he attempted to create a housing project of one hundred and fifty units in Chelsea, Quebec, to provide funding for a college of natural medicine and a Maharishi Aruy-Vedic college. Pommet ran for the Natural Law Party in three federal elections and one provincial election. A newspaper report from 1999 describes him as a seven-time former candidate, which suggests that he has run for municipal office as well.	M			472	0.94	6th
Sherbrooke	Daniel Jolicoeur	Jolicoeur has been a candidate of the Natural Law Party in the United Kingdom and Canada, and at the provincial level in Quebec. He identified as a health technician in 1993.	M			495	0.98	6th
Terrebonne—Blainville	Pascale Levert	Levert had previously sought election for the Natural Law Party of Ontario in the 1999 provincial election.	F			1,193	2.14	5th

== Ontario ==
=== Eglinton—Lawrence: Matthew Macleod ===
Macleod is a musician. He has released an album entitled Comedies, Histories, Tragedies, and performed a solo concert at EcoFair 2003 (organized by the Maharishi University of Management). He received 133 votes (0.32%), finishing seventh against Liberal incumbent Joe Volpe.

=== Hamilton East: Helene Anne Darisse ===
Darisse, also called Helene Darisse-Yildirim, is a teacher and video producer from the Niagara Falls area. She holds Bachelor of Education and Master of Arts degrees (Canada NewsWire, 17 December 2000), and is a member of the Ontario Straw Bale Building Coalition , and the Canadian Yoga Alliance.

Darisse was a perennial candidate for the Natural Law Party at both the federal and provincial levels.

Electoral record
Election	Division	Party	Votes	%	Place	Winner
1993 federal	Oshawa	Natural Law	263		7/9	Ivan Grose, Liberal
1995 provincial	Welland—Thorold	Natural Law	232		5/5	Peter Kormos, New Democratic Party
1997 federal	St. Catharines	Natural Law	245	0.51	7/7	Walt Lastewka, Liberal
1999 provincial	St. Catharines	Natural Law	272	0.58	4/6	Jim Bradley, Liberal
2000 federal	Hamilton East	Natural Law	97		9/9	Sheila Copps, Liberal

=== Hamilton West: Rita Rassenberg ===
Rassenberg was born in Switzerland, and moved to Canada in her 20s. She has worked as an office administrator, bookkeeper, sales manager and real-estate estate (Hamilton Spectator, 16 November 2000).

She was a frequent candidate for the Natural Law Party at both the provincial and federal levels.

Electoral record
Election	Division	Party	Votes	%	Place	Winner
1993 federal	Hamilton West	Natural Law	396		6/7	Stan Keyes, Liberal
1995 provincial	Hamilton West	Natural Law	284		5/6	Lillian Ross, Progressive Conservative
1999 provincial	Hamilton West	Natural Law	231	0.56	7/7	David Christopherson, New Democratic Party
2000 federal	Hamilton West	Natural Law	94		8/10	Stan Keyes, Liberal

=== Lanark—Carleton: Britt Roberts ===
Roberts was a perennial candidate for the Natural Law Party. He campaigned in the federal elections of 1993, 1997 and 2000, and also campaigned for the Natural Law Party of Ontario in 1999.

Roberts became active in transcendental meditation while attending the University of Toronto, and studied yogic flying at a Natural Law conference in the United States in 1983. He completed a Master of Business Administration degree in Iowa, and moved to Ottawa in 1994. Roberts has been active in the Maharishi Global Development Fund.

During the 1999 provincial election, Roberts described the Natural Law Party's development as follows: "It's about providing a new paradigm. In the first stage, people just ignore it, and then they ridicule. Then, they admit that they agreed with it all along. We may still be at the early stages of that process, but it is coming." He was 45 years old at the time (Kingston Whig-Standard, 29 May 1999).

Electoral record
Election	Division	Party	Votes	%	Place	Winner
1993 federal	Lanark—Carleton	Natural Law	262		7/9	Ian Murray, Liberal
1997 federal	Lanark—Carleton	Natural Law	181		7/7	Ian Murray, Liberal
1999 provincial	Leeds—Grenville	Natural Law	244		5/5	Bob Runciman, Progressive Conservative
2000 federal	Lanark—Carleton	Natural Law	107	0.17	8/8	Scott Reid, Canadian Alliance

=== Niagara Falls: Bill Amos ===
William Norman Amos was a property manager and real-estate salesperson in Niagara Falls. He began practising transcendental meditation in 1974, and later became active with the Maharishi Mahesh Yogi's international network. He ran for the Natural Law Party of Canada four times and the Natural Law Party of Ontario twice, and was involved in the proposed Maharishi Veda Land Canada theme park in his home city.

While running in a federal by-election in 1996, Amos argued that there was scientific proof that regular meditation by one per cent of the population would bring about a reduction in crime and unemployment rates. He also promised to eliminate Canada's Goods and Services Tax, and suggested the introduction of a thirty per cent flat tax to eliminate Canada's deficit and debt (with the understanding that the rate would be reduced after such time). When asked for his opinion on Canada's Young Offenders Act, he said that he would promote meditation in youth jails to reduce crime. He was forty-nine years old at the time.

Electoral record
Election	Division	Party	Votes	%	Place	Winner
1993 federal	Niagara Falls	Natural Law	169	0.39	7/8	Gary Pillitteri, Liberal
1995 provincial	Niagara Falls	Natural Law	355	1.27	4/5	Bart Maves, Progressive Conservative
federal by-election, 17 June 1996	Hamilton East	Natural Law	64	0.24	11/13	Sheila Copps, Liberal
1997 federal	Niagara Falls	Natural Law	154	0.37	6/6	Gary Pillitteri, Liberal
1999 provincial	Niagara Falls	Natural Law	317	0.78	4/6	Bart Maves, Progressive Conservative
2000 federal	Niagara Falls	Natural Law	155	0.40	6/6	Gary Pillitteri, Liberal

=== Ottawa—Vanier: Pierrette J. Blondin ===
Blondin has a Master of Education degree. She was a frequent candidate for the NLP at the provincial and federal levels. During the 1995 provincial election, she described herself as having twenty-eight years' experience as a teacher in the Ottawa-Carleton French School Board, and fifteen years' experience with transcendental meditation.

Electoral record
Election	Division	Party	Votes	%	Place	Winner
1993 federal	Glengarry—Prescott—Russell	Natural Law	456	0.8	5/6	Don Boudria, Liberal
1995 provincial	Prescott and Russell	Natural Law	446	1.0	6/6	Jean-Marc Lalonde, Liberal
1999 provincial	Ottawa—Vanier	Natural Law	580	1.46	5/6	Claudette Boyer, Liberal
2000 federal	Ottawa—Vanier	Natural Law	187	0.39	7/9	Mauril Belanger, Liberal

=== St. Catharines: Jim Morris ===
Morris listed himself as the lead hand at Dominion Controls. He was a frequent candidate for the NLP at the provincial and federal levels.

Electoral record
Election	Division	Party	Votes	%	Place	Winner
1995 provincial	Oxford	Natural Law	275		6/7	Ernie Hardeman, Progressive Conservative
1997 federal	Oxford	Natural Law	181		7/7	John Finlay, Liberal
1999 provincial	Oxford	Natural Law	203		7/7	Ernie Hardeman, Progressive Conservative
2000 federal	St. Catharines	Natural Law	203	0.43	5/7	Walt Lastewka, Liberal

=== Toronto Centre—Rosedale: David Gordon ===
David Gordon is an advertising executive, and was based in Toronto during the period of his federal campaigns. He gave demonstrations in "yogic flying" during the 1993 federal election, and argued that the Natural Law Party would allow young Canadians to "gain enlightenment and perfection in their own lives and at the same time materialize their noble sentiments for an ideal civilization in Canada".

He ran for the Natural Law Party of Canada twice and was a candidate for the Natural Law Party of Ontario in 1995.

Electoral record
Election	Division	Party	Votes	%	Place	Winner
1993 federal	Scarborough Centre	Natural Law	190	0.47	6/10	John Cannis, Liberal
1995 provincial	Sudbury	Natural Law	315	1.04	5/7	Rick Bartolucci, Liberal
2000 federal	Toronto Centre—Rosedale	Natural Law	224		7/9	Bill Graham, Liberal

Electoral record
Election	Division	Party	Votes	%	Place	Winner
1997 federal	Gatineau	Natural Law	448	0.82	5/7	Mark Assad, Liberal
1998 provincial	Chapleau	Natural Law	167	0.41	5/6	Benoît Pelletier, Liberal
federal by-election, 15 November 1999	Hull—Aylmer	Natural Law	103	0.58	8/9	Marcel Proulx, Liberal
2000 federal	Gatineau	Natural Law	472	0.94	6/9	Mark Assad, Liberal

Electoral record
Election	Division	Party	Votes	%	Place	Winner
1992 United Kingdom federal	Gillingham	Natural Law	190		5/5	James Couchman, Conservative
1993 federal	Nickel Belt	Natural Law	173	0.39	6/8	Ray Bonin, Liberal
1998 provincial	Saint-François	Natural Law	106		5/6	Monique Gagnon-Tremblay, Liberal
2000 federal	Sherbrooke	Natural Law	495	0.98	6/8	Serge Cardin, Bloc Québécois
