= GTExpress =

GTExpress may refer to:

- A store brand operated by Giant Tiger, a Canadian discount retailer
- A bank location operated by Guaranty Trust Bank, a Nigerian multinational bank
