= Bill Vankoughnet =

Canadian politician

Ontario MPP
- In office 1995–1999
- Preceded by: Fred Wilson
- Succeeded by: Riding abolished
- Constituency: Frontenac—Addington

Member of Parliament for Hastings—Frontenac—Lennox and Addington Hastings—Frontenac (1979-1983)
- In office 1979–1993
- Preceded by: Re-established riding
- Succeeded by: Larry McCormick

Personal details
- Born: January 7, 1943 (age 83) Kingston, Ontario
- Party: PC (Canada) (1979-1993); PC (Ontario) (1995-1999)
- Occupation: Municipal administrator

William John Vankoughnet (born January 7, 1943) is a former politician in Ontario, Canada. He was a Progressive Conservative member of the House of Commons of Canada from 1979 to 1993, and a Progressive Conservative member of the Legislative Assembly of Ontario from 1995 to 1999.

== Background ==
Vankoughnet was educated at Loyalist College and Queen's University, and subsequently worked as a municipal administrator. He was also an active freemason and shriner, and is a life member of the Monarchist League of Canada and the Royal Canadian Legion.

== Federal politics ==
He was elected to the Canadian House of Commons in the 1979 federal election, defeating Liberal candidate Ron Vastokas by about 6,500 votes in the rural riding of Hastings—Frontenac, near Kingston. He was re-elected over Vastokas by a narrower margin in the 1980 election, and by a greater margin in the 1984 election in the renamed riding of Hastings—Frontenac—Lennox and Addington. In the 1988 election, he defeated Liberal candidate Earl Smith by fewer than 1,000 votes. During his fourteen years in parliament, Vankoughnet never held an official legislative position. Unlike most Progressive Conservative MPs, Vankoughnet opposed the Meech Lake constitutional accord.

The Progressive Conservatives lost all their Ontario seats in the 1993 federal election, and Vankoughnet lost to Liberal Larry McCormick by over 13,000 votes.

== Provincial politics ==
Vankoughnet was elected to the provincial legislature two years later, defeating Liberal candidate Peter Walker and incumbent New Democrat Fred Wilson in the riding of Frontenac—Addington. He served as a backbench supporter for the next four years.

Vankoughnet's prospects for career advancement all but ended on May 1, 1996, when he was caught trying to buy sexual favours from an undercover police officer who was posing as a prostitute in the Parkdale neighbourhood of Toronto. The charges were dropped when Vankoughnet agreed to attend a "john school". After he was arrested he withdrew from the Progressive Conservative caucus and briefly sat as an independent until he returned on September 23, 1996. Vankoughnet played only a minimal role in the legislature after this incident. Ironically, he was formally accepted into the exclusive Albany Club of Toronto on the same day as his arrest.

In 1996, the government of Mike Harris reduced the number of provincial ridings from 130 to 103. This forced a number of sitting MPPs to compete against one another for renomination. Vankoughnet, his reputation still damaged by the prostitute incident, lost the Progressive Conservative nomination in Hastings—Frontenac—Lennox and Addington to Harry Danford in 1999.

== Federal politics (2nd time) ==
Vankoughnet sought a political comeback in 2004 by challenging Scott Reid for the Conservative Party of Canada nomination in Lanark—Frontenac—Lennox and Addington. The party refused to permit his candidacy, however, and Vankoughnet challenged Reid in the general election as an independent candidate. He received only 820 votes.
