= Scott Reid (politician) =

Canadian politician

Scott Reid MP
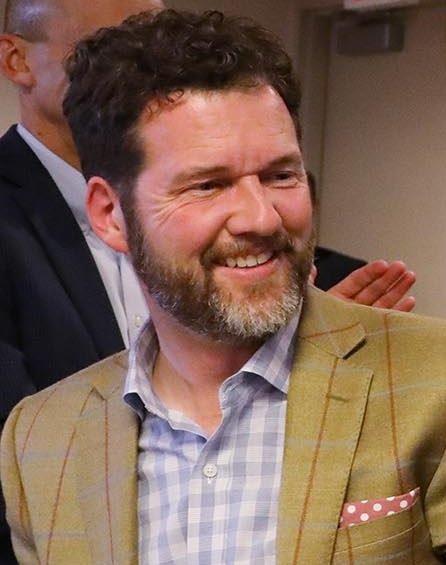

Official Opposition Critic for Democratic Institutions
- In office November 20, 2015 – January 30, 2018
- Leader: Rona Ambrose (interim); Andrew Scheer
- Preceded by: Craig Scott
- Succeeded by: Blake Richards

Member of Parliament
- Incumbent
- Assumed office June 28, 2004
- Preceded by: Larry McCormick
- Constituency: Lanark—Frontenac—Lennox and Addington (2004–2015); Lanark—Frontenac—Kingston (2015–2025); Lanark—Frontenac (2025–present)
- In office November 27, 2000 – June 28, 2004
- Preceded by: Ian Murray
- Succeeded by: Gordon O'Connor
- Constituency: Lanark-Carleton

Personal details
- Born: Scott Jeffrey Reid; January 25, 1964 (age 62) Hull, Quebec
- Party: Conservative
- Other political affiliations: Reform (1993–2000); Alliance (2000–2003)
- Spouse: Robyn Mulcahy (partner)
- Education: Carleton University (BA, MA)
- Profession: Author, journalist

Scott Jeffrey Reid MP (born January 25, 1964) is a Canadian politician, businessman, and heir to the Giant Tiger fortune. He has served in the House of Commons of Canada since 2000, and currently represents the Ontario riding of Lanark—Frontenac—Kingston as a member of the Conservative Party.

== Personal life ==
Reid was born in Hull, Quebec, the son of Leatrice (Sibales) and businessman Gordon Reid. He holds a Bachelor of Arts in political science and a Master of Arts in Russian history from Carleton University in Ottawa, and has written on federalism and the Canadian constitution. He was raised in his father's Unitarian church, and remains a member of that faith. His mother is Jewish, with roots in Bialystok, Poland.

Reid lives in Perth with his wife, Robyn Mulcahy. He separated from his earlier spouse, Lynda Cuff–Reid, early in 2013.

Reid also serves as Chairman of Giant Tiger Stores Ltd., founded by his father Gordon Reid.

== Early life ==
Reid worked full-time in 1985–1989 for the Canadian merchandising chain Giant Tiger.

Reid focused primarily on intellectual activities before running for public office, working as an author, journalist, researcher and lecturer. In 1990–1991, he worked in Port Townsend, Washington, writing for the American journal Liberty. He reported on events in Ottawa between 1992 and 1994 for the Alberta Report, and wrote opinion pieces for the National Post newspaper in 1999 and 2000. During the 1997–98 academic year, he was an instructor at the University of Western Sydney in Australia.

=== As author ===
In the early nineties, Reid published two books: Canada Remapped: How the Partition of Quebec Will Reshape the Nation (1992) and Lament for a Notion: The Life and Death of Canada's Bilingual Dream (1993). In 2014, Reid and former Liberal MP Mario Silva co-edited a book, Tackling Hate: Combating Antisemitism: The Ottawa Protocol.

As well, Reid has written chapters in a number of edited books, and published articles in magazines and academic journals. Many of his writings focus on subjects such as the Canadian Charter of Rights and Freedoms, the role of the judiciary, property rights, national unity (with an emphasis on the consequences of Quebec separation) and official bilingualism.

==== National unity and partition ====
In Canada Remapped, Reid argues that the Canadian government should establish a clear legal framework to "govern the mechanics" of both provincial separation and the partition of a seceding province. While he does not endorse separation or partition, he argues that such a legal framework may be necessary to prevent the sectarian violence of Northern Ireland and the former Yugoslavia from surfacing in Canada, should Quebec voters choose to secede. He concludes the work by advising that a "legal, constitutional method" for provincial secession be entrenched in the Canadian Constitution.

==== Official bilingualism ====
The title of Reid's second book, Lament for a Notion, is an allusion to George Grant's 1965 classic, Lament for a Nation. Reid asserts in this work that Canada's system of official bilingualism has been an expensive failure, based on a utopian model developed by former Prime Minister Pierre Trudeau rather than on what Reid suggests is the more practical model of "territorial bilingualism", proposed by the 1963–1970 Royal Commission on Bilingualism and Biculturalism (B&B Commission). He also argues that the existing system of bilingualism costs the Canadian economy four billion dollars every year to sustain.

Under Reid's model of territorial bilingualism, official language services would be extended only to those "relatively limited areas" of the country where "French or English is the language of the local majority or a strong local minority, but not of the provincial majority." He argues that this approach would involve "the smallest amount of disruption to individuals" of any proposed model of official bilingualism, and so describes it as the "most just" approach from a utilitarian point of view.

Lament for a Notion received mixed reviews in the Canadian press. The Montreal Gazette ran a strongly negative review by George Tombs, who rejected Reid's calculations of the cost of official bilingualism as arbitrary and unreliable. A subsequent review in the literary journal Books in Canada described Reid's work as narrowly ideological; this review included the line, "Reid's notion of justice is a familiar one: justice is whatever the marketplace provides; injustice is whatever government does."

Other reviews were more positive. Denis Smith wrote in the Toronto Star that Lament was a "hard-headed, fair and devastating account" of the existing system of official bilingualism, adding that its recommendations were "sensible" and "very difficult to refute". The Calgary Herald described the book as “a remarkable study: Informed, provocative, even visionary”.

==== On the Constitution and Charter of Rights ====
In a 1996 essay, "Penumbras for the People" (1996), Reid advocated the adoption of a law that would permit Parliament to invoke Section 33 of the Charter of Rights (the so-called "Notwithstanding Clause", which permits Parliament and the provincial legislatures to re-enact laws that have been struck down by the courts as being in violation of the Charter), only if its use had first been authorized in a national referendum. In a follow-up article written for the National Post in 1999, Reid argued that this approach would empower the Canadian electorate, and "reduce the power of the courts to make arbitrary judgments as to the meaning of vaguely drafted Charter rights".

Reid further argued that this "democratization" of the Notwithstanding Clause would provide greater clarity to Section 1 of the Charter of Rights, which permits laws to remain in effect even if they infringe on Charter-protected rights, as long as the infringements are (to use the words used in Section 1) "reasonable" and "can be demonstrably justified in a free and democratic society". He wrote that it is difficult for judges to determine which infringements are "demonstrably justified", and that "one can scarcely imagine a more appropriate way of demonstrably justifying what constitutes a reasonable limit on rights in a free and democratic society," than by popular referendums.

==== Electoral reform ====
Reid's first involvement with this issue took place in 1997, when he was the researcher assigned to a Reform Party task force on electoral reform. From 2004 to 2005, Reid served on a House of Commons committee studying electoral reform, and authored a dissenting report on behalf of Conservative MPs, advocating that any change to the electoral system should be designed by a Citizens’ Assembly on the model used the previous year in British Columbia. In a 2005 article in the Canadian Parliamentary Review, Reid argued that Canada should choose between different electoral models using “a preferential referendum whereby voters would place a “1” on the ballot beside their preferred option, a “2” beside the option that they like second-best, and so on. If no single option won a majority of the votes, the least-favoured option would be dropped from the ballot, and the ballots of voters who had chosen this option as their first preference would be redistributed to the options that had been their respective second choices. This process would continue until a single option achieves a clear majority."

=== Political advisor (1994–2000) ===
Reid served as a constitutional advisor to Reform Party leader Preston Manning in the 1990s, and was the Senior Researcher for the parliamentary caucus of the Reform Party from 1994 to 1997. After the formation of the Canadian Alliance in 2000, he worked as a speechwriter and organizer in Stockwell Day's leadership campaign. In the same year, Reid criticized Jean Chrétien's Clarity Act as failing to provide a clear framework for future referendums on Quebec separatism.

== Opposition MP (2000–2006) ==
Reid was first elected to the Canadian House of Commons in the 2000 federal election as a member of the Canadian Alliance. He narrowly defeated Liberal incumbent Ian Murray in the riding of Lanark—Carleton to become one of only two Alliance representatives from Ontario. After the election, he was appointed as Alliance critic for Intergovernmental Affairs (including official languages) and served in 2001–02 as the vice-chair of the Standing Joint Committee of the House of Commons and Senate on Official Languages.

Reid was Stephen Harper's primary Ontario organizer in 2002, during Harper's successful challenge against Stockwell Day for the Alliance leadership. Reid was part of the five-person transition team that arranged for Harper to assume the leadership, following Harper's March 2002 victory. The following year, he was appointed as a lead negotiator for the Alliance in the merger talks with the Progressive Conservative Party that led to the creation of the Conservative Party of Canada.

For the 2004 election campaign, Reid transferred to the riding of Lanark—Frontenac—Lennox and Addington. Early in the contest, he provoked controversy by re-asserting that official bilingualism is too broadly applied in Canada and that the policy should be reviewed by the House of Commons and Senate Standing Committees on Official Languages. The comment provoked an immediate reaction from Prime Minister Paul Martin, who warned that Reid's proposals reflected “the kind of Canada that Stephen Harper wants." Georges Arès, the president of the Fédération des communautés francophones et acadiennes, also expressed concern. Reid clarified that his views did not represent Conservative Party policy, and he resigned as the party's official languages critic later the same day.

Some in the media felt that both the controversy and Reid's reaction had been overblown. An editorial in the National Post argued that “perhaps no one in Parliament understands the Official Languages Act better than Scott Reid,” and expressed the hope that Reid would soon “be restored to that portfolio, either as critic or minister, after the election is over.” An Ottawa Citizen editorial stated that “the level of political debate in Canada has plunged again with the verbal attack on ... Scott Reid.”

The controversy did not hurt Reid's chances for re-election; he defeated Liberal incumbent Larry McCormick by over 10,000 votes. The Liberals were cut down to a minority government in the 38th Canadian parliament, and Reid remained on the Official Opposition front bench as his party's critic for Democratic Reform and for Fednor (Federal Economic Development Initiative for Northern Ontario).

== Government MP (2006–2015) ==
Reid was re-elected in the 2006 federal election, in which the Conservatives won a minority government. He served as deputy Government House Leader.

While an opposition MP, Reid had argued that returning officers in elections should be appointed by a non-partisan agency instead of the government. This measure was included in the Harper government's Accountability Act, introduced in 2006. In May of the same year, Reid brought forward a motion to prevent the Federal Ethics Commissioner from making public the identities of employers of dependent children of Members of Parliament. The Commissioner had been given this power to safeguard against conflict-of-interest situations, but Reid and other MPs argued that it was a violation of privacy.

Reid proposed several amendments at the Conservative Party's 2008 convention in Winnipeg. Two of his amendments, which would have changed the weighting of ridings in leadership elections, were defeated. Two other amendments to make the party more democratic were passed easily: one calls for members of the party's National Council to be elected by preferential ballot, and the other mandates that postal ballots be used for leadership elections.

== Return to opposition (2015–present) ==
In the 2015 federal election, the Conservatives were removed from power. Reid was re-elected from Lanark—Frontenac—Kingston, essentially a reconfigured version of his old riding, with a 14.1% margin of victory—his smallest margin of victory since his initial election to the House of Commons in 2000.

Reid was subsequently named to the House of Commons Special Committee on Electoral Reform, and served as one of the two vice-chairs of the committee. He lost his seat on the Human Rights subcommittee, but retained his membership on the Procedure and House Affairs Committee, and was named Conservative critic for the Democratic Institutions portfolio.

At the Conservative Party's 2016 national convention, Reid participated in an effort to amend the party constitution so that Rona Ambrose, then the interim party leader, would be permitted to become a candidate in the party's 2017 leadership race. Reid afterward described Ambrose as "the best prime minister Canada never had." Subsequently, however, he supported Andrew Scheer's leadership campaign.

Reid endorsed Leslyn Lewis in the 2020 Conservative Party of Canada leadership election.

=== Procedural opposition to COVID-19 emergency measures ===
On 24 March 2020 as the COVID-19 pandemic raged, the Commons sat briefly "at noon as scheduled and then suspended for behind-the-scenes negotiations". Reid "defied his own party orders to stay away from Ottawa" in order that he ensure that legislation outlining COVID-19 relief measures did not receive unanimous consent. Reid had referred to the legislation in a blog post as a "Henry VIII Bill" for allowing the executive to function without the approval of Parliament. In the event, Hansard has no record on that date of his full-throated dissent. He also stated that his objection was completely procedural, and that he had no objection to the bill provided it was delivered to MPs with sufficient time to read and understand it.

== Ideology ==
Reid describes himself as more libertarian than conservative, and holds a combination of civil libertarian and socially conservative views. In 2001 he published an article in Policy Options arguing that the federal government should turn over to individual provinces the power to decide whether marijuana would be made legal within their own boundaries. (Reid noted that this was how Canada had dealt with the issue of alcohol prohibition a century earlier, and maintained that this approach "would be the most effective method of reflecting in Canadian law our culturally based, and therefore evolving, views towards drugs.") On November 27, 2017, Reid was the only MP to break party ranks and vote in support of C-45, a bill that would eventually legalize cannabis.

In 2001, he was one of four Canadian Alliance MPs to break party ranks and vote against the Chrétien government's Anti-Terrorism Act, arguing that it violated traditional civil liberties and should be time-limited by a "Sunset Clause".

Reid opposes both capital punishment and abortion, but has voted on such issues based on the preferences of his constituents, rather than on the basis of his own views. Reid voted against the Martin government's same-sex marriage legislation in 2005, after consulting his constituents on the issue (although he also argued that the bill infringed upon religious rights). In 2012, he voted against re-opening the abortion debate, despite his own pro-life views, after conducting another consultation.

Reid supports marijuana legalization and was the only Conservative MP to vote in favour of the Cannabis Act, the law which legalized recreational cannabis use nationwide in Canada.

=== Human rights ===
During his first two terms as an MP, Reid became closely associated with efforts to end the persecution of Falun Gong practitioners in the People's Republic of China. A motion (M-236) drafted by Reid, which called upon Prime Minister Jean Chrétien to raise the issue of thirteen imprisoned Falun Gong practitioners with close family ties to Canada, was unanimously adopted by the House of Commons on October 24, 2002. This action has been credited with causing the release of some of the prisoners and their subsequent emigration to Canada. Despite Reid's efforts, the Canadian immigration department declined to admit Mingli Lin, a prisoner who was named in Motion M-236, and Lin was re-arrested in 2005.

Between 2007 and 2015, Reid chaired the International Human Rights subcommittee of the House Standing Committee on Foreign Affairs.

Reid chaired the steering committee of the Canadian Parliamentary Coalition to Combat Antisemitism (CPCCA), a multi-partisan group of MPs which organized an international conference on antisemitism in Ottawa in 2010, and was vice-chair of the CPCCA's inquiry panel into domestic antisemitism within Canada, which published its report in 2011.

=== Provincial politics ===
Reid was a founding member of the Lanark Landowners Association, the first of the county-based property rights associations that developed into the Ontario Landowners Association. A longtime friend and supporter of the OLA's first president, Randy Hillier, Reid encouraged Hillier to run for the Progressive Conservative Party of Ontario candidacy for the 2007 provincial election in Reid's riding of in Lanark—Frontenac—Lennox and Addington. Prior to the nomination, some members of the provincial party expressed concern about Hillier's candidacy, and the Toronto Star speculated that the party might disqualify him. Reid responded that he would be "very disappointed" if Hillier were prevented from running, adding "I can't think of anything more dangerous to our prospects [of winning in this riding]". In October 2007, Hillier was elected MPP for Lanark—Frontenac—Lennox and Addington by a narrow margin. In 2009, Reid was one of two Ontario MPs to endorse Randy Hillier's bid for the provincial PC leadership.

=== Other initiatives ===
- Reid has held 11 "constituency referendums" in which he asked his constituents how he should vote on a moral issue. This includes votes on the Anti-Terrorism Act (2001), the Species at Risk Act (2002), the Civil Marriage Act (2005) and a parliamentary motion on reopening the abortion debate (2012). He has then voted as instructed by constituents. On two of these occasions, this caused him to vote against his party.
- Each year, Reid donates to charity the proceeds of the $20,000 pay raise that MPs voted themselves in 2001. Each year the money is used to purchase defibrillators for use in hockey rinks, seniors centres, and local police forces in his riding. Reid explained his decision to make the donations by saying, "MPs were making $109,000 at the time. If a single guy living in a small town can't get by on $109,000, he's not trying too hard."
- In an annual survey conducted by the Hill Times newspaper in May 2006, Reid was voted second in the "Most Generous MP" category, second in the "Most Fun to Work For" category, third in the "Throws the Best Parties" category, and second in the "Worst-Dressed Male MP" category. Reid's dress habits have since met with greater media approval; in 2007 Reid told the Hill Times that he thought Fred Astaire and the Duke of Windsor were "the two best-dressed men of the 20th century," and in the December 2013 issue of iPolitics, Reid was cited as one of the "Top 10 list of the best dressed MPs, chosen for their extra thought on style...."
- Each June since 2003, Reid has held an artisanal beer tasting event on Parliament Hill. Reid says the event "promotes small-scale, artisanal, value-added production that is ... closely associated with the land, agriculture, recapturing the traditional way of doing things." Despite this, Reid has the lowest hospitality budget in the House of Commons, prompting CBC reporter Terry Milewski to brand Reid the “supreme leader of the Tightwads.”

== Electoral record ==
2025 Canadian federal election: Lanark—Frontenac
| Party | Candidate | Votes | % | ±% |
|---|---|---|---|---|
| Conservative | Scott Reid | 34,186 | 50.41 | +0.72 |
| Liberal | Michelle Foxton | 30,900 | 45.57 | +19.74 |
| New Democratic | Danielle Rae | 1,986 | 2.93 | –12.32 |
| Green | Jesse Pauley | 741 | 1.09 | –1.59 |
| Total valid votes | | 67,813 | 99.32 | |
| Total rejected ballots | | 465 | 0.68 | +0.00 |
| Turnout | | 68,278 | 75.87 | +5.78 |
| Eligible voters | | 89,989 | | |
| Conservative hold | | Swing | | –9.51 |
Source: Elections Canada

2021 Canadian federal election: Lanark—Frontenac—Kingston
| Party | Candidate | Votes | % | ±% | Expenditures |
|---|---|---|---|---|---|
| Conservative | Scott Reid | 30,761 | 48.9 | +0.8 | $32,571.09 |
| Liberal | Michelle Foxton | 16,617 | 26.4 | +1.7 | $80,805.83 |
| New Democratic | Steve Garrison | 9,828 | 15.6 | +1.5 | $13,794.74 |
| People's | Florian Bors | 3,830 | 6.1 | +4.3 | $12,211.43 |
| Green | Calvin Neufeld | 1,664 | 2.6 | -8.6 | $3,411.15 |
| Rhinoceros | Blake Hamilton | 211 | 0.3 | – | $0.00 |
| Total valid votes/expense limit | | 62,911 | – | – | $118,720.24 |
| Total rejected ballots | | 435 | | | |
| Turnout | | 63,346 | 70.11 | | |
| Eligible voters | | 90,348 | | | |
Source: Elections Canada

2019 Canadian federal election: Lanark—Frontenac—Kingston
| Party | Candidate | Votes | % | ±% | Expenditures |
|---|---|---|---|---|---|
| Conservative | Scott Reid | 30,077 | 48.1 | +0.2 | $31,656.25 |
| Liberal | Kayley Kennedy | 15,441 | 24.7 | -11.1 | $24,751.79 |
| New Democratic | Satinka Schilling | 8,835 | 14.1 | – | $13.181.99 |
| Green | Stephen Kotze | 7,011 | 11.2 | +7.7 | $25,332.91 |
| People's | Matthew Barton | 1,117 | 1.8 | – | none listed |
| Total valid votes/expense limit | | 62,481 | 100.0 | – | $112,784.66 |
| Total rejected ballots | | 434 | 0.69 | +0.30 | |
| Turnout | | 62,915 | 72.5 | -0.39 | |
| Eligible voters | | 86,806 | | | |
| Conservative hold | | Swing | | +5.65 | |
Source: Elections Canada

2015 Canadian federal election: Lanark—Frontenac—Kingston
| Party | Candidate | Votes | % | ±% | Expenditures |
|---|---|---|---|---|---|
| Conservative | Scott Reid | 27,399 | 47.9 | -12.18 | $44,082.97 |
| Liberal | Phil Archambault | 19,325 | 33.8 | +17.42 | $60,112.47 |
| New Democratic | John Fenik | 8,073 | 14.1 | -4.02 | $26,561.89 |
| Green | Anita Payne | 2,025 | 3.5 | -1.38 | $4,231.95 |
| Libertarian | Mark Budd | 418 | 0.7 | – | $1,284.49 |
| Total valid votes/Expense limit | | 57,240 | 100 | | $211,962.28 |
| Total rejected ballots | | 222 | 0.39 | – | |
| Turnout | | 57,462 | 72.89 | – | |
| Eligible voters | | 78,826 | | | |
| Conservative hold | | Swing | | -14.8 | |
Source: Elections Canada

2011 Canadian federal election: Lanark—Frontenac—Lennox and Addington
| Party | Candidate | Votes | % | ±% | Expenditures |
|---|---|---|---|---|---|
| Conservative | Scott Reid | 33,754 | 57.27 | +1.39 | $38,507 |
| New Democratic | Doug Smyth | 12,174 | 20.65 | +7.53 | $11,967 |
| Liberal | David Remington | 9,940 | 16.86 | -4.94 | $53,903 |
| Green | John Baranyi | 2,702 | 4.58 | -3.96 | $15,798 |
| Independent | Ralph Lee | 370 | 0.63 | – | $1,542 |
| Total valid votes | | 58,940 | 100 | – | |
| Total rejected ballots | | 170 | 0.29 | +0.04 | |
| Turnout | | 59,110 | 65.53 | +4.49 | |
| Eligible voters | | 90,197 | – | – | |

2008 Canadian federal election: Lanark—Frontenac—Lennox and Addington
| Party | Candidate | Votes | % | ±% | Expenditures |
|---|---|---|---|---|---|
| Conservative | Scott Reid | 30,272 | 55.88 | +4.81 | $47,946 |
| Liberal | David Remington | 11,809 | 21.80 | -2.93 | $54,213 |
| New Democratic | Sandra Willard | 7,112 | 13.12 | -3.03 | $12,999 |
| Green | Chris Walker | 4,629 | 8.54 | +3.31 | $12,887 |
| Marijuana | Ernest Rathwell | 347 | 0.64 | -0.20 | $0 |
| Total valid votes/Expense limit | | 54,169 | 100 | $94,298 | |
| Total rejected ballots | | 137 | 0.25 | -0.11 | |
| Turnout | | 54,306 | 61.04 | -6.63 | |

2006 Canadian federal election: Lanark—Frontenac—Lennox and Addington
| Party | Candidate | Votes | % | ±% | Expenditures |
|---|---|---|---|---|---|
| Conservative | Scott Reid | 30,367 | 51.07 | +2.30 | $79,120 |
| Liberal | Geoff Turner | 14,709 | 24.73 | -6.24 | $70,090 |
| New Democratic | Helen Forsey | 9,604 | 16.15 | +3.03 | $12,483 |
| Green | Mike Nickerson | 3,115 | 5.23 | +0.39 | $8,973 |
| Progressive Canadian | Jeffrey Bogaerts | 735 | 1.23 | – | |
| Marijuana | Ernest Rathwell | 501 | 0.84 | -0.01 | |
| Canadian Action | Jerry Ackerman | 429 | 0.72 | – | $7,594 |
| Total valid votes | | 59,460 | 100 | | |
| Total rejected ballots | | 217 | 0.36 | | |
| Turnout | | 59,677 | 67.67 | | |
| Electors on the lists | | 88,185 | | | |

2004 Canadian federal election: Lanark—Frontenac—Lennox and Addington
| Party | Candidate | Votes | % |
|---|---|---|---|
| Conservative | Scott Reid | 27,566 | 48.77 |
| Liberal | Larry McCormick | 17,507 | 30.97 |
| New Democratic | Ross Sutherland | 7,418 | 13.12 |
| Green | John Baranyi | 2,736 | 4.84 |
| Independent | Bill Vankoughnet | 820 | 1.45 |
| Marijuana | George Kolaczynski | 479 | 0.85 |
| Total valid votes | | 56,526 | 100 |

2000 Canadian federal election: Lanark—Carleton
| Party | Candidate | Votes | % | Expenditures |
|---|---|---|---|---|
| Alliance | Scott Reid | 24,670 | 38.93 | $74,059.08 |
| Liberal | Ian Murray | 22,811 | 35.99 | $55,838.83 |
| Progressive Conservative | Bryan Brulotte | 12,430 | 19.61 | $44,930.08 |
| New Democratic | Theresa Kiefer | 1,946 | 3.07 | $1,246.34 |
| Green | Stuart Langstaff | 871 | 1.37 | $4,165.48 |
| Canadian Action | Ross Elliott | 388 | 0.61 | $4,019.98 |
| Independent | John Baranyi | 150 | 0.24 | $0.00 |
| Natural Law | Britt Roberts | 107 | 0.17 | $0.00 |
| Total valid votes | | 63,373 | 100.00 | |
| Total rejected ballots | | 192 | | |
| Turnout | | 63,565 | 66.11 | |
| Electors on the lists | | 96,157 | | |
Sources: Official Results, Elections Canada and Financial Returns, Elections Canada.
