= Gordon Reid (businessman) =

Canadian businessperson (1933–2023)

Gordon Reid (1933 – July 8, 2023) was a Canadian businessman. He was the founder of Giant Tiger, Canada’s third-largest chain of discount stores.

== Early life (1933–1961) ==
Reid was born in 1933 in Vancouver, British Columbia, the son of May (Slaney) and Noble Greenway Reid. As a boy, he moved to the working-class Montreal suburb of Verdun. Reid's mother worked in the retail industry, behind the lunch counter at the Woolworth's in downtown Montreal. His own retailing career began at age 13, gift-wrapping parcels part-time at the Robert Simpson Company in Montreal. In 1949, at age 16, Reid went to work full-time in the men's furnishings department at Simpsons after he had been expelled from school for what he described as "misbehaving, setting a bad example, something that was quite small." Over the next six years he gradually rose in the company. At age 22 he completed the company's management training program, but left Simpson's when he learned that his pay would remain fixed at $65 a week.

In 1955, Reid was hired by Frank Hacking, a Toronto-based importer, to sell Japanese-made sporting goods to retailers in Quebec. In 1957, he moved to Windsor and set up an office for Hacking across the river in Detroit, to sell to American retailers. It was in the American Midwest during the subsequent two years that Reid first saw discount stores—a new concept at the time. He was particularly impressed by Uncle Bill's, a chain headquartered in Cleveland, Ohio. The discount store concept did not yet exist in Canada, and it therefore represented a business opportunity.

== Giant Tiger ==
=== Early years (1961–1971) ===
Reid returned to Canada and in May 1961 opened the first Giant Tiger store, with a $15,000 investment. The store was located at the corner of George Street and Dalhousie Street in Ottawa's Byward Market, in the building that had formerly housed Ottawa's French-language newspaper, Le Droit. Reid was so short of cash that he was unable to afford proper store fixtures, and had to build his own display tables. Initially, he had intended to name his store Top Value Discount, but discovered that in Canada, the "Top Value" trademark was already owned by the Loeb grocery store chain. According to Reid, he made this discovery when he spotted the name on the side of the carton from which he was pouring milk into his breakfast cereal. His second choice was "Giant Tiger", a name which had not been trademarked in Canada, although it was then being used by another of the discount chains that he had encountered in Ohio.

Reid chose Ottawa as the location for his first store because he believed that public service paycheques would ensure a customer base with a stable income. As well, the city still had a relatively uncompetitive retail environment, and in particular, no shopping centres. This initial choice would reflect a long-time focus on selecting locations (usually in small towns) that were sheltered from direct competition with other retailers. Reid's intention was to build a national chain, due to his belief that it was necessary to place large-volume merchandise orders in order get the best prices, which could then be passed on to consumers. However, for years it was not possible to put this strategy into effect, as Giant Tiger's expansion was initially extremely slow. In its first year, Giant Tiger’s total sales volume was only $139,781, and Reid had to rely upon his wife's income as a teacher to cover expenses. A second store was not successfully opened until 1965, and by the chain’s tenth anniversary in 1971, Giant Tiger had only expanded to six stores, and its survival rested, to a large degree, on the fact that it was servicing uncompetitive markets.

=== Finding a successful formula and expanding (1971–2023) ===
Reid attributes Giant Tiger’s rapid growth in the years that followed to several shifts in the company’s business philosophy.

One key change was a revision of its merchandise mix. The chain moved away from its original emphasis on male-oriented goods such as hardware and sporting equipment, instead focusing on clothing and housewares aimed primarily at a female customer base. After this shift in the early 1970s, approximately 75% of its clientele was female.

Second, Reid introduced a policy of making key head office personnel co-owners of the chain. By 1980, ownership had been extended to ten additional individuals. In a 1980 interview, Reid cited the agricultural cooperative movement as the inspiration for this approach. By giving employees an ownership stake, the company fostered a shared interest in profitability, similar to the principles underlying cooperative organizations.

The third innovation, which Reid has always insisted is the most important component of Giant Tiger's long-term success, was its unusual method of issuing franchises. A 1980 article describes Giant Tiger's franchise system this way:

The company charges franchisees $1 up front plus a percentage of annual sales. Before the franchise is handed over, the manager must earn his Giant Tiger stripes by working for the company at least a year. Most franchisees come with recommendations from years of service in the retail business. 'We don't consider a person unless he has oodles of experience,' says Reid.

The practice of issuing $1 franchises and of attracting the best managers from other chains has continued essentially unchanged since that time. In 2010, Reid reported that the issuing of no-cost franchises to experienced retailers "was a great way to get experienced people. Over the years we had a lot come from Woolworth, Kresge, Kmart and later Zellers." In the same interview, Reid stated that over twenty Giant Tiger franchises are now run by former Walmart employees, most of whom had been attracted by the same franchise system that he had introduced decades earlier.

The first Giant Tiger franchise, for a store in Maniwaki, Quebec, was issued in the late 1960s to Jean-Guy Desjardins. The benefit of this new way of operating was felt immediately. Up to this point, Reid and his small head office staff had been trying to make all key decisions, with the result that, despite its small size, the chain was slow-moving and inflexible. But from the moment the change was made, "the [Maniwaki] store made money and I didn't have to do anything. [Jean-Guy Desjardins] did the advertising, he found the location, he merchandised it to suit his customers, he did everything…. And, I thought, 'by golly, that's a good system.' "

The greater autonomy that could be permitted to franchise owners whose personal financial interests were symmetrical with those of the head office meant that there was less need for Giant Tiger to develop centralized systems. Eleven years after Giant Tiger's first experiment with franchising, Reid emphasized the flexibility that it gave his company: "The weakness of the chain stores is that they try to standardize." Such standardization was not possible in a small chain which at the time maintained its low prices by locating in awkward and non-standard spaces such as converted bowling alleys or garages, and which refused to put money into standardized fixtures or furniture, or to invest in standardized office systems. One newspaper reported that "Giant Tiger defiantly pretends the computer hasn't been invented. Its idea of a sophisticated inventory and accounting system is a bigger filing cabinet."

In the early 1990s, as rumours spread of Walmart's likely expansion into Canada, Reid began to prepare his company for the challenges that would be associated with a much more competitive retail environment. He became a director of the Washington D.C.–based International Mass Retail Association and began to travel regularly to American markets to study Walmart and the survival strategies of its more successful competitors. After Walmart stores opened in Canada, Reid insisted on exactly matching their prices, which his employees verified daily.

In later years, Reid slowly relinquished direct control of Giant Tiger. In 1999, Reid resigned the presidency of Giant Tiger in favour of Jeff York, an executive with ten years' experience at the company. In October 2010, Reid turned over the post of chief executive officer to Andy Gross, an executive with over 25 years' experience at Giant Tiger, who had, by this time, already inherited the presidency from Jeff York. Reid remains chairman of the board.

In 2013, news began to spread that the company was exploring the option of a possible sale. While the business remained profitable, Reid, as its largest shareholder, declared that he was looking for other opportunities after being in the business for more than 50 years.

== Personal life and death ==
In 2010, even after handing over the reins as CEO, "Reid still goes to work six days a week." However, he claimed that "I have been cutting down my involvement over the years. I used to come in at 6 a.m. and leave at whatever at night. Now I come in when I feel like it and leave when I feel like it."

Reid had three children, including Canadian Member of Parliament Scott Reid.

Gordon Reid died on July 8, 2023, at the age of 89.

== Board memberships and affiliations ==
- Board Member, Canadian Council of Chief Executives;
- Member, Canadian Council of Chief Executives;
- Board Member, International Mass Retail Association;
- Board Member, Ottawa Heart Institute;
- Board Member, Retail Industry Leaders Association.

== Lifetime achievement award ==
In 2010, the Retail Council of Canada awarded Reid its Lifetime Achievement Award. The press release for the award cited both Reid’s history as founder of Giant Tiger and the company’s $2 million in annual donations to charity and community associations.
