= Lanark—Frontenac—Lennox and Addington (federal electoral district) =

Former federal electoral district in Ontario, Canada

Coordinates: 44.9°N 76.6°W

Ontario electoral district
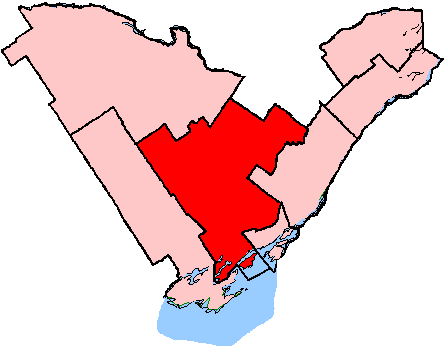
- Lanark—Frontenac—Lennox and Addington shown within the Eastern Ontario region

Defunct federal electoral district
- Legislature: House of Commons
- District created: 2003
- District abolished: 2013
- First contested: 2004
- Last contested: 2011
- District webpage: profile, map

Demographics
- Population (2011): 119,617
- Electors (2011): 88,966
- Area (km²): 8,516.96
- Census division(s): Frontenac, Lanark, Lennox and Addington
- Census subdivision(s): Addington Highlands, Beckwith, Carleton Place, Central Frontenac, Drummond/North Elmsley, Greater Napanee, Lanark Highlands, Loyalist, Montague, North Frontenac, Perth, Smiths Falls, South Frontenac, Stone Mills, Tay Valley

Lanark—Frontenac—Lennox and Addington was a federal electoral district in Ontario, Canada which was represented in the House of Commons of Canada between 2004 and 2015. It was abolished for the 2015 general election; the Lanark County and Frontenac components of the riding were redistributed to the new district of Lanark—Frontenac—Kingston, while Lennox and Addington County was redistributed to the new district of Hastings—Lennox and Addington.

The riding was created in 2003 from parts of Hastings—Frontenac—Lennox and Addington and Lanark—Carleton, and was first contested in the 2004 federal election. Conservative candidate Scott Reid, the incumbent MP for Lanark-Carleton and Liberal candidate Larry McCormick, incumbent MP for Hastings—Frontenac—Lennox and Addington, both ran for the seat. Bill Vankoughnet, a former Progressive Conservative MP who had represented Hastings—Frontenac—Lennox and Addington prior to 1993, also ran for the seat. Reid was elected by a margin of over 10,000 votes, and was re-elected by gradually increasing margins in 2006, 2008, and 2011. By the final election held in the riding, Reid's margin of victory had grown to 20,000 votes.

The riding's conservative voting pattern was in line with rural ridings immediately to the west of the city of Ottawa; in four federal elections, Reid never dipped below 27,000 votes, while no challenger rose above 18,000 votes. He was the only MP ever elected in Lanark—Frontenac—Lennox and Addington.

== Members of Parliament ==
Parliament	Years	Member	Party
Lanark—Frontenac—Lennox and Addington; Riding created from Hastings—Frontenac—Lennox and Addington and Lanark—Carleton
38th	2004–2006	Scott Reid	Conservative
39th	2006–2008	Scott Reid	Conservative
40th	2008–2011	Scott Reid	Conservative
41st	2011–2015	Scott Reid	Conservative
Riding dissolved into Lanark—Frontenac—Kingston and Hastings—Lennox and Addington

== Election results ==
2011 Canadian federal election
Party	Candidate	Votes	%	±%	Expenditures
Conservative	Scott Reid	33,754	57.27	+1.39	–
New Democratic	Doug Smyth	12,174	20.65	+7.53	–
Liberal	David Remington	9,940	16.86	-4.94	–
Green	John Baranyi	2,702	4.58	-3.96	–
Independent	Ralph Lee	370	0.63	–	–
Total valid votes		58,940	100.00	–	
Total rejected ballots		170	0.29	+0.04	
Turnout		59,110	65.53	+4.49	
Eligible voters		90,197	–	–	

2008 Canadian federal election
Party	Candidate	Votes	%	±%	Expenditures
Conservative	Scott Reid	30,272	55.88	+4.81	$47,946
Liberal	David Remington	11,809	21.80	-2.93	$54,213
New Democratic	Sandra Willard	7,112	13.12	-3.03	$12,999
Green	Chris Walker	4,629	8.54	+3.31	$12,887
Marijuana	Ernest Rathwell	347	0.64	-0.20	$0
Total valid votes/Expense limit		54,169	100.00	$94,298	
Total rejected ballots		137	0.25	-0.11	
Turnout		54,306	61.04	-6.63	

2006 Canadian federal election: Lanark—Frontenac—Lennox and Addington
Party	Candidate	Votes	%	Expenditures
Conservative	Scott Reid	30,367	51.07	$79,119.82
Liberal	Geoff Turner	14,709	24.74	$70,089.93
New Democratic	Helen Forsey	9,604	16.15	$12,483.01
Green	Mike Nickerson	3,115	5.24	$8,973.29
Progressive Canadian	Jeffrey Bogaerts	735	1.24	
Marijuana	Ernest Rathwell	501	0.84	
Canadian Action	Jerry Ackerman	429	0.72	$7,594.30
Total valid votes		59,460	100.00	
Total rejected ballots		217		
Turnout		59,677	67.67	
Electors on the lists		88,185		
Sources: Official Results, Elections Canada and Financial Returns, Elections Canada.

2004 Canadian federal election
Party	Candidate	Votes	%
Conservative	Scott Reid	27,566	48.77
Liberal	Larry McCormick	17,507	30.97
New Democratic	Ross Sutherland	7,418	13.12
Green	John Baranyi	2,736	4.84
Independent	Bill Vankoughnet	820	1.45
Marijuana	George Kolaczynski	479	0.85
Total valid votes		56,526	100.00

== See also ==
- List of Canadian electoral districts
- Historical federal electoral districts of Canada
