= Larry McCormick (Canadian politician) =

Canadian politician

Larry McCormick (January 4, 1940 – May 3, 2011) was a Canadian politician. He was born in Enterprise, Ontario.

McCormick was a member of the Liberal Party of Canada in the House of Commons of Canada, representing the riding Hastings—Frontenac—Lennox and Addington from 1993 to 2004. Benefiting from vote-splitting between the Progressive Conservatives and the Reform Party, he was the first Liberal since 1935 to win a seat in this area in the House of Commons. McCormick was Parliamentary Secretary to the Minister of Agriculture and Agri-Food.

McCormick's seat was merged with parts of the former riding of Lanark—Carleton, forcing him into a contest with that riding's Conservative incumbent, Scott Reid in the 2004 election. With the end of vote-splitting on the right, Reid won the seat by over 10,000 votes.

Before serving in Ottawa, McCormick owned and operated McCormick's Country Store on County Road 4 in Camden East. He was married to wife Reta and had one child, a daughter, Kayla.

Preceded by Bill Vankoughnet, Prog. Cons.	Members of Parliament from Hastings—Frontenac—Lennox and Addington	Succeeded by Scott Reid, Conservative (Lanark—Frontenac—Lennox and Addington)
