= Lanark—Frontenac =

Federal electoral district in Ontario, Canada

Coordinates: 44.901°N 76.684°W

Ontario electoral district
- Interactive map of riding boundaries from the 2025 federal election

Federal electoral district
- Legislature: House of Commons
MP
Scott Reid
Conservative
- District created: 2013
- First contested: 2015
- Last contested: 2025
- District webpage: profile, map

Demographics
- Population (2011): 98,409
- Electors (2015): 77,808
- Area (km²): 7,322
- Pop. density (per km²): 13.4
- Census division(s): Frontenac, Lanark
- Census subdivision(s): South Frontenac, Mississippi Mills, Carleton Place, Smiths Falls, Beckwith, Drummond/North Elmsley, Perth, Tay Valley, Lanark Highlands, Central Frontenac

Lanark—Frontenac (formerly Lanark—Frontenac—Kingston) is a federal electoral district in Eastern Ontario, Canada.

== Geography ==
The riding consists of the entirety of Lanark County (including Perth and Smiths Falls) and all of Frontenac County north of the city of Kingston.

== History ==
Lanark—Frontenac—Kingston was created by the 2012 federal electoral boundaries redistribution and was legally defined in the 2013 representation order. It came into effect upon the call of the 42nd Canadian federal election, scheduled for 19 October 2015. The riding was created out of parts of Lanark—Frontenac—Lennox and Addington (79%), Carleton—Mississippi Mills (13%) and Kingston and the Islands (8%). The riding was originally intended to be named Lanark—Frontenac.

Following the 2022 Canadian federal electoral redistribution, this riding was renamed Lanark—Frontenac from Lanark—Frontenac—Kingston. This came into effect at the 2025 federal election. It lost all of its territory in the city of Kingston in the process.

== Demographics ==
According to the 2021 Canadian census

Ethnic groups: 90.5% White, 6.6% Indigenous

Languages: 92.0% English, 3.3% French

Religions: 59.1% Christian (22.7% Catholic, 10.9% United Church, 8.9% Anglican, 2.5% Presbyterian, 1.2% Methodist, 1.1% Baptist, 1.0% Pentecostal, 10.8% Other), 39.3% None

Median income: $44,400 (2020)

Average income: $54,150 (2020)

== Members of Parliament ==
This riding has elected the following members of Parliament:

Parliament	Years	Member	Party
Lanark—Frontenac—Kingston; Riding created from Carleton—Mississippi Mills, Kingston and the Islands and Lanark—Frontenac—Lennox and Addington
42nd	2015–2019	Scott Reid	Conservative
43rd	2019–2021	Scott Reid	Conservative
44th	2021–2025	Scott Reid	Conservative
Lanark—Frontenac
45th	2025–present	Scott Reid	Conservative

== Election results ==
Graph of election results in Lanark—Frontenac—Kingston (minor parties that never got 2% of the vote or didn't run consistently are omitted)

2025 Canadian federal election
Party	Candidate	Votes	%	±%
Conservative	Scott Reid	34,186	50.41	+0.72
Liberal	Michelle Foxton	30,900	45.57	+19.74
New Democratic	Danielle Rae	1,986	2.93	–12.32
Green	Jesse Pauley	741	1.09	–1.59
Total valid votes		67,813	99.32	
Total rejected ballots		465	0.68	+0.00
Turnout		68,278	75.87	+5.78
Eligible voters		89,989		
Conservative hold		Swing		–9.51
Source: Elections Canada

2021 federal election redistributed results
Party	Vote	%
Conservative	29,182	49.69
Liberal	15,170	25.83
New Democratic	8,956	15.25
People's	3,645	6.21
Green	1,576	2.68
Rhinoceros	201	0.34
Total valid votes	58,730	99.32
Rejected ballots	401	0.68
Registered voters/ estimated turnout	84,362	70.09

2021 Canadian federal election: Lanark—Frontenac—Kingston
Party	Candidate	Votes	%	±%	Expenditures
Conservative	Scott Reid	30,761	48.9	+0.8	$32,571.09
Liberal	Michelle Foxton	16,617	26.4	+1.7	$80,805.83
New Democratic	Steve Garrison	9,828	15.6	+1.5	$13,794.74
People's	Florian Bors	3,830	6.1	+4.3	$12,211.43
Green	Calvin Neufeld	1,664	2.6	-8.6	$3,411.15
Rhinoceros	Blake Hamilton	211	0.3	–	$0.00
Total valid votes/expense limit		62,911	–	–	$118,720.24
Total rejected ballots		435			
Turnout		63,346	70.11		
Eligible voters		90,348			
Source: Elections Canada

2019 Canadian federal election: Lanark—Frontenac—Kingston
Party	Candidate	Votes	%	±%	Expenditures
Conservative	Scott Reid	30,077	48.1	+0.2	$31,656.25
Liberal	Kayley Kennedy	15,441	24.7	-11.1	$24,751.79
New Democratic	Satinka Schilling	8,835	14.1	–	$13.181.99
Green	Stephen Kotze	7,011	11.2	+7.7	$25,332.91
People's	Matthew Barton	1,117	1.8	–	none listed
Total valid votes/expense limit		62,481	100.0	–	$112,784.66
Total rejected ballots		434	0.69	+0.30	
Turnout		62,915	72.5	-0.39	
Eligible voters		86,806			
Conservative hold		Swing		+5.65	
Source: Elections Canada

2015 Canadian federal election
Party	Candidate	Votes	%	±%	Expenditures
Conservative	Scott Reid	27,399	47.87	-12.22	$44,082.97
Liberal	Phil Archambault	19,325	33.76	+17.39	$60,112.47
New Democratic	John Fenik	8,073	14.10	-4.01	$26,561.89
Green	Anita Payne	2,025	3.54	-1.34	$4,231.95
Libertarian	Mark Budd	418	0.73	–	$1,284.49
Total valid votes/Expense limit		57,240	100.00		$212,950.75
Total rejected ballots		222	0.39	–	
Turnout		57,462	72.90	–	
Eligible voters		78,826			
Conservative hold		Swing		-14.80	
Source: Elections Canada

2011 federal election redistributed results
Party	Vote	%
Conservative	30,149	60.08
New Democratic	9,090	18.12
Liberal	8,217	16.38
Green	2,449	4.88
Independent	274	0.55

== See also ==
- List of Canadian electoral districts
- Historical federal electoral districts of Canada
