= Hastings—Frontenac—Lennox and Addington =

Former electoral district in Ontario, Canada

Ontario electoral district
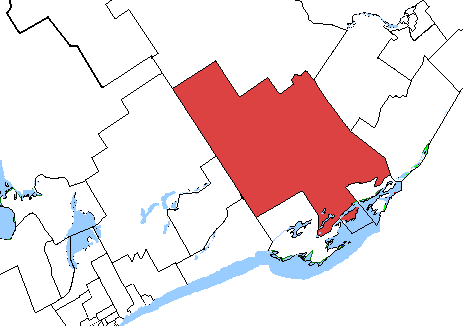
- Boundaries of the riding as compared to others of the 1996 redistribution

Defunct federal electoral district
- Legislature: House of Commons
- District created: 1983
- District abolished: 2003
- First contested: 1984
- Last contested: 2000

Hastings—Frontenac—Lennox and Addington was a federal and provincial electoral district in Ontario, Canada, that was represented in the House of Commons of Canada from 1984 to 2003, and in the Legislative Assembly of Ontario from 1999 to 2007.

== Geography ==
The federal riding was created in 1976 when Hastings—Frontenac was renamed. The riding initially consisted of:

- that part of the County of Frontenac including and lying northerly of the Townships of Portland, Loughborough, Storrington and Pittsburg, but excluding the southwest part of the Township of Pittsburg;
- that part of the County of Hastings including and lying northerly of the Townships of Marmora, Madoc and Elzevir;
- the County of Lennox and Addington, but excluding the Township of Armherst Island.

In 1987, the riding was re-defined to consist of:

- that part of the County of Frontenac including and lying northerly of the Townships of Portland, Loughborough, Storrington and Pittsburg, but excluding the southwest part of the Township of Pittsburg;
- the County of Lennox and Addington but excluding the Township of Armherst Island;
- that part of the County of Hastings lying northerly of the southerly boundary of the townships of Hungerford, Huntingdon and Rawdon and the southerly limit of the Village of Stirling.

In 1996, the riding was re-defined to consist of:

- the County of Frontenac, excepting the City of Kingston, the townships of Howe Island, Kingston and Wolfe Island, and that part of the Township of Pittsburgh lying south of the Macdonald-Cartier Freeway;
- the County of Lennox and Addington;
- that part of the County of Hastings lying northerly of the southerly boundary of the townships of Hungerford, Huntingdon and Rawdon, and the southerly limit of the Village of Stirling.

The electoral district was abolished in 2003 when it was redistributed into the Kingston and the Islands, Lanark—Frontenac—Lennox and Addington, and Prince Edward—Hastings ridings.

== Members of Parliament ==
This riding has elected the following members of Parliament:

Parliament	Years	Member	Party
Riding created from Hastings—Frontenac
33rd	1984–1988	Bill Vankoughnet	Progressive Conservative
34th	1988–1993	Bill Vankoughnet	Progressive Conservative
35th	1993–1997	Larry McCormick	Liberal
36th	1997–2000	Larry McCormick	Liberal
37th	2000–2004	Larry McCormick	Liberal
Riding dissolved into Lanark—Frontenac—Lennox and Addington, Prince Edward—Hastings and Kingston and the Islands

== Election results ==
=== Federal ===
1984 Canadian federal election
Party	Candidate	Votes
Progressive Conservative	Bill Vankoughnet	19,996
Liberal	Ron Vastokas	9,757
New Democratic Party	Donna Forth	5,349
Independent	Ross Baker	441

1988 Canadian federal election
Party	Candidate	Votes
Progressive Conservative	Bill Vankoughnet	17,247
Liberal	Earl Smith	16,379
New Democratic	Bud Acton	7,455
Christian Heritage	Richard Welsman	1,598
Independent	Ross Baker	478

1993 Canadian federal election
Party	Candidate	Votes
Liberal	Larry McCormick	24,085
Progressive Conservative	Bill Vankoughnet	10,963
Reform	Stephen Ollerenshaw	8,851
New Democratic	Betty Hay Lambeck	2,012
National	Bob Hilson	997
Independent	T. Cheemo The Clown Walczak	752
Independent	Ross Baker	413

1997 Canadian federal election
Party	Candidate	Votes
Liberal	Larry McCormick	18,399
Progressive Conservative	Daryl Kramp	12,227
Reform	Sean McAdam	12,045
New Democratic	Robert Snefjella	3,255
Christian Heritage	Kenneth L. Switzer	505
Natural Law	Lester Newby	189

2000 Canadian federal election
Party	Candidate	Votes
Liberal	Larry McCormick	16,996
Alliance	Sean McAdam	13,227
Progressive Conservative	Daryl Kramp	10,231
New Democratic	Tom O'Neill	2,200
Green	Chris Walker	516
Independent	Ross Baker	207
Canadian Action	Paul Isaacs	156
No affiliation	Kenneth Switzer	43

=== Provincial ===
2003 Ontario general election
Party	Candidate	Votes	%	±%
Liberal	Leona Dombrowsky	21,548	51.89	+5.15
Progressive Conservative	Barry F. Gordon	13,709	33.01	-9.51
New Democratic	Ross Sutherland	4,286	10.32	+3.43
Green	Adam Scott	1,311	3.16	+1.84
Family Coalition	John-Henry Westen	673	1.62	+0.42

1999 Ontario general election
Party	Candidate	Votes	%
Liberal	Leona Dombrowsky	20,395	46.74
Progressive Conservative	Harry Danford	18,553	42.52
New Democratic	Allan Mcphail	3,008	6.89
Green	Cathy Vakil	576	1.32
Family Coalition	John-henry Westen	524	1.2
Natural Law	Peter Leggat	382	0.88
Independent	Karl Walker	200	0.46

== See also ==
- List of Ontario provincial electoral districts
- List of Canadian electoral districts
- Historical federal electoral districts of Canada
