= Gordon O'Connor =

Canadian politician

Brigadier-General the Honourable Gordon O'Connor PC OMM CD
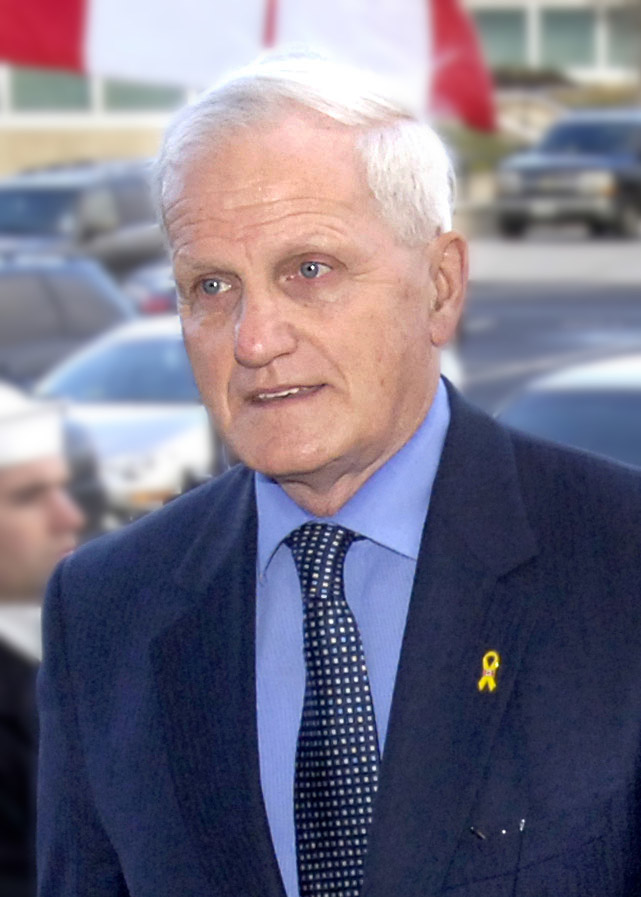

Minister of State Chief Government Whip
- In office October 30, 2008 – July 15, 2013
- Prime Minister: Stephen Harper
- Preceded by: Jay Hill
- Succeeded by: John Duncan

Minister of National Revenue
- In office August 14, 2007 – October 29, 2008
- Prime Minister: Stephen Harper
- Preceded by: Carol Skelton
- Succeeded by: Jean-Pierre Blackburn

Minister of National Defence
- In office February 6, 2006 – August 14, 2007
- Prime Minister: Stephen Harper
- Preceded by: Bill Graham
- Succeeded by: Peter MacKay

Member of Parliament for Carleton—Mississippi Mills
- In office June 28, 2004 – August 4, 2015
- Preceded by: Scott Reid
- Succeeded by: Karen McCrimmon

Personal details
- Born: May 18, 1939 (age 87) Toronto, Ontario
- Party: Conservative
- Spouse: Carol O'Connor
- Profession: Soldier, defence consultant
- Portfolio: Minister of State; Chief Government Whip
- Awards: Order of Military Merit (Canada); Canadian Forces' Decoration

Military service
- Branch/service: Canadian Army
- Years of service: 1964-1994
- Rank: Brigadier general
- Unit: Royal Canadian Dragoons

Gordon James O'Connor, PC OMM CD (born May 18, 1939) is a retired brigadier-general, businessman, and lobbyist, who served as Conservative Member of Parliament from 2004 to 2015.

He served as Minister of National Defence (2006-2007) and then Minister of National Revenue (2007-2008) in the cabinet of Stephen Harper. O'Connor was one of the few defence ministers to have served in the military, the most recent prior to O'Connor being Gilles Lamontagne. In 2008 he was demoted to Minister of State and Chief Government Whip and then dropped from cabinet entirely in 2013 and did not run for re-election in 2015.

== Early life and family ==
Born in Toronto, Ontario, he has a B.Sc. in Mathematics and Physics from Concordia University (Montreal) and a BA in Philosophy from York University.

O'Connor is married and has two children. He resides in the Ottawa suburb of Kanata, Ontario, where he has lived for over 25 years.

== Military career ==
He served over 30 years in the Canadian Army, starting as a second lieutenant in the Royal Canadian Armoured Corps and retired at the rank of brigadier-general.

O'Connor then entered the private sector as Vice-President of Business Development for a large facility management firm, and Vice-President of Operations for a vehicle testing centre. He was a Senior Associate with Hill & Knowlton Canada, a worldwide public relations, public affairs and strategic communications company. O'Connor has also been a lobbyist for several defence companies. These companies include: BAE Systems (1996 to 2004), General Dynamics (1996 to 2001), Atlas Elektronik GmbH (1999 to 2004), and Airbus Military (2001 to 2004).

== Parliamentary career ==
He was elected in the 2004 elections as a Conservative candidate in the Ottawa riding of Carleton—Mississippi Mills with slightly more than 50% of the vote. After winning he became Defence Critic for the Official Opposition. His vote share increased in the 2006 election and again in the 2008 election. He is an honorary member of the Royal Military College of Canada Club, S157.

O'Connor was initially expected to contest Kanata—Carleton, essentially the Ottawa portion of his old riding, in the 2015 election. However, on May 20, 2014, O'Connor announced he would retire after the next election. According to his office manager, John Aris, O'Connor simply decided it was time to leave politics.

=== Cabinet selection ===
Though somewhat muted by the higher profile issues in the naming of David Emerson and Michael Fortier to the cabinet, the posting of O'Connor to the position of Minister of National Defence by Prime Minister Harper was met with controversy. Harkening back to ethics and accountability issues including a promised crackdown on lobbying and reforms to lobbying legislation that Harper raised during the 2006 federal election, O'Connor's employment as a lobbyist for several major defence industry companies including some of the world's largest military contractors, such as General Dynamics, BAE Systems and Airbus as recently as 2004 was seen by many as peculiar. Some feared that with the posting the minister would often be dealing with the very companies for whom he advised and assisted in soliciting defence contracts; seemingly putting him in constant peril of conflict-of-interest issues. However, the aim of the Accountability Act is to prevent people from moving from government to lobbying, and not the opposite as was the case with O'Connor (at least not this time, although in the past he went from Brigadier General in the Canadian Forces to lobbyist).

There were potential conflict-of-interest issues early in his term, as one of the first major issues the Conservatives pledged they would sort out was the replacement of the Forces' 'tactical airlift' fleet. One of the most prominent companies bidding for the contract to replace the present fleet of C-130 Hercules Turboprops is Airbus S.A.S. for whom O'Connor worked as a lobbyist until February 2004, lobbying the former Liberal government to purchase the airplane that would become the Airbus A400M for its tactical airlift fleet.

=== Minister of National Defence ===
Within months of Gordon O'Connor becoming Minister of National Defence, the Canadian Government announced the purchase of 4 C-17 Globemaster IIIs, manufactured by Boeing Integrated Defense Systems for $3.4 billion, 16 CH-47 Chinook medium lift helicopters, also from Boeing Integrated Defense Systems, for $4.7 billion, 17 C-130Js from Lockheed Martin for $4.9 billion, 2300 Medium-Sized Logistics Trucks for $1.1 billion, and $2.9 billion for 3 Joint Support Ships, for a total of $17 billion.

O'Connor announced on May 30, 2006, that the Canadian Forces would be restricting usage of the Mercedes G-Wagon to on-base operations only, after a number of Canadian soldiers were killed while travelling in the lightly armoured vehicle. However, three months later it was revealed that no such order was ever given, and the controversial vehicles were still being used in combat operations.

In a major cabinet shuffle on August 14, 2007, Prime Minister Harper moved O'Connor to the position of Minister of National Revenue, replacing him in the defence portfolio with former Foreign Minister Peter MacKay.

== Controversies ==
=== Afghanistan ===
In May 2005, Canada's practice of transferring persons detained by the Canadian Forces in Afghanistan to units of the Afghan police came under question when some prisoners said they were beaten and abused. O'Connor told Parliament that the International Committee of the Red Cross: "The Red Cross or the Red Crescent is responsible to supervise their treatment once the prisoners are in the hands of the Afghan authorities. If there is something wrong with their treatment, the Red Cross or Red Crescent would inform us and we would take action."

This statement was later denied by the ICRC, which stated that it was "informed of the agreement, but ... not a party to it and ... not monitoring the implementation of it." The ICRC also advised that, in accordance with its normal operating procedure, it would not notify any foreign government (Canada included) of abuse found in Afghan prisons.

On March 13, O'Connor travelled to Kandahar to meet with Abdul Noorzai of the Afghan Independent Human Rights Commission, "look the man in the eyes", and gain assurances that detainees were being supervised.

O'Connor subsequently acknowledged in an official release that his statement in Parliament was not true, and that the ICRC was not monitoring detainees and not informing Canada as he claimed.

Additional controversy was generated in the week of April 23 when The Globe and Mail reported that 30 Afghan men formerly under Canadian custody alleged they had been tortured by their Afghan captors. Two days later, another Globe story ran on a government report from which "negative references to acts such as torture, abuse, and extra judicial killings were blacked out without an explanation." The difficulties faced by O'Connor were exacerbated after various government ministers and Stephen Harper himself gave apparently conflicting testimony on the existence and nature of the agreement with Afghan forces to supervise detainees.

Following these revelations, the opposition parties unanimously demanded O'Connor's resignation; a demand echoed by some press commentators such as Andrew Coyne. Stephen Harper resisted calls for O'Connor's dismissal.

O'Connor also faced criticism for remarks that Canada was in Afghanistan as an act of retribution for 9/11.

=== Letter to Donald Rumsfeld ===
In December 2006, O'Connor wrote to outgoing United States Secretary of Defense Donald Rumsfeld praising his "vision", "many achievements", and "significant contribution", adding: "Here we have been privileged to benefit from your leadership" in "the campaign against terror." Some critics argued the letter was excessively flattering and went beyond the demands of courtesy.

=== Forgiving tax bills ===
As Minister of National Revenue, O'Connor issued a remission order forgiving the tax bills of 35 former SDL Optics Inc. employees. The employees had used stock options to buy shares in their company for a fraction of their market value. The options were taxable and the shareholders owed hundreds of thousands of dollars in taxes.

O'Connor's order was made against the advice of Canada Revenue Agency commissioner William Baker. Tax professionals called it favouritism and "purely political." Most of the affected employees lived in the riding of fellow Conservative Cabinet Minister Gary Lunn.

== Notes ==
28th Canadian Ministry (2006–2015) – Cabinet of Stephen Harper
Cabinet posts (2)
Predecessor	Office	Successor
Carol Skelton	Minister of National Revenue; 2007–2008	Jean-Pierre Blackburn
Bill Graham	Minister of Defence; 2006–2007	Peter MacKay
Sub-Cabinet Post
Predecessor	Title	Successor
Jay Hill	Minister of State (2008–2013) (Also served as Chief Government Whip)	John Duncan
Parliament of Canada
Preceded by riding created in 2003; see Lanark—Carleton	Member of Parliament from Carleton—Mississippi Mills; 2004–2015	Succeeded by riding abolished
