= Ian Murray (Canadian politician) =

Canadian politician

Member of the Canadian Parliament for Lanark-Carleton
- In office 1993–2000
- Preceded by: Paul Dick
- Succeeded by: Scott Reid

Personal details
- Born: Ian Munro Murray; May 7, 1951 (age 74); Sarnia, Ontario, Canada
- Political party: Liberal

Ian Munro Murray (born May 7, 1951) is a Canadian politician. He served in the House of Commons of Canada from 1993 to 2000, as a member of the Liberal Party.

Murray was born in Sarnia, Ontario, and received a Bachelor of Arts degree in History from the University of Guelph in 1973. He had an extensive career in Canadian politics before running for office himself. Murray was a research assistant for a Member of Parliament (MP) from 1974 to 1976, and a special assistant to the parliamentary secretary to the Minister of Communications from 1976 to 1977. From 1977 to 1979 and 1980 to 1982, he served as special assistant to the Minister of Veterans Affairs. Murray served with Northern Telecom Ltd. from 1982 to 1993, and was director of Government Relations from 1987 to 1993.

He won the Liberal nomination for Lanark—Carleton in 1993 under unusual conditions. After five counts on a preferential ballot, Murray and another candidate were deadlocked in support. The returning officer broke the tie by giving Murray the nomination, but his opponent appealed this decision to party headquarters. The nomination was finally decided by a coin toss. Murray disapproved of this selection method, but the decision nonetheless went in his favour and he was formally approved as a candidate. He was elected by a large margin in the 1993 federal election, defeating Progressive Conservative incumbent Paul Dick by over 18,000 votes in a riding that has not traditionally voted Liberal.

Murray considered voting against his government's gun control bill in 1995, but ultimately supported the government side. In 1996, he voted against the second reading of a government bill that extended anti-discrimination protection to gays and lesbians. Murray claimed he did not object to the principle of the bill, but opposed it on the grounds that it could result in a redefinition of the traditional family.

Murray easily retained the seat in the 1997 election, but lost the seat by a slim margin to Canadian Alliance candidate Scott Reid in the 2000 election. In 2003, Murray was appointed to a five-year term on the Veterans Review and Appeals Board by the government of Jean Chrétien.
