= Giant Tiger =

Canadian discount store chain

Giant Tiger Stores Limited

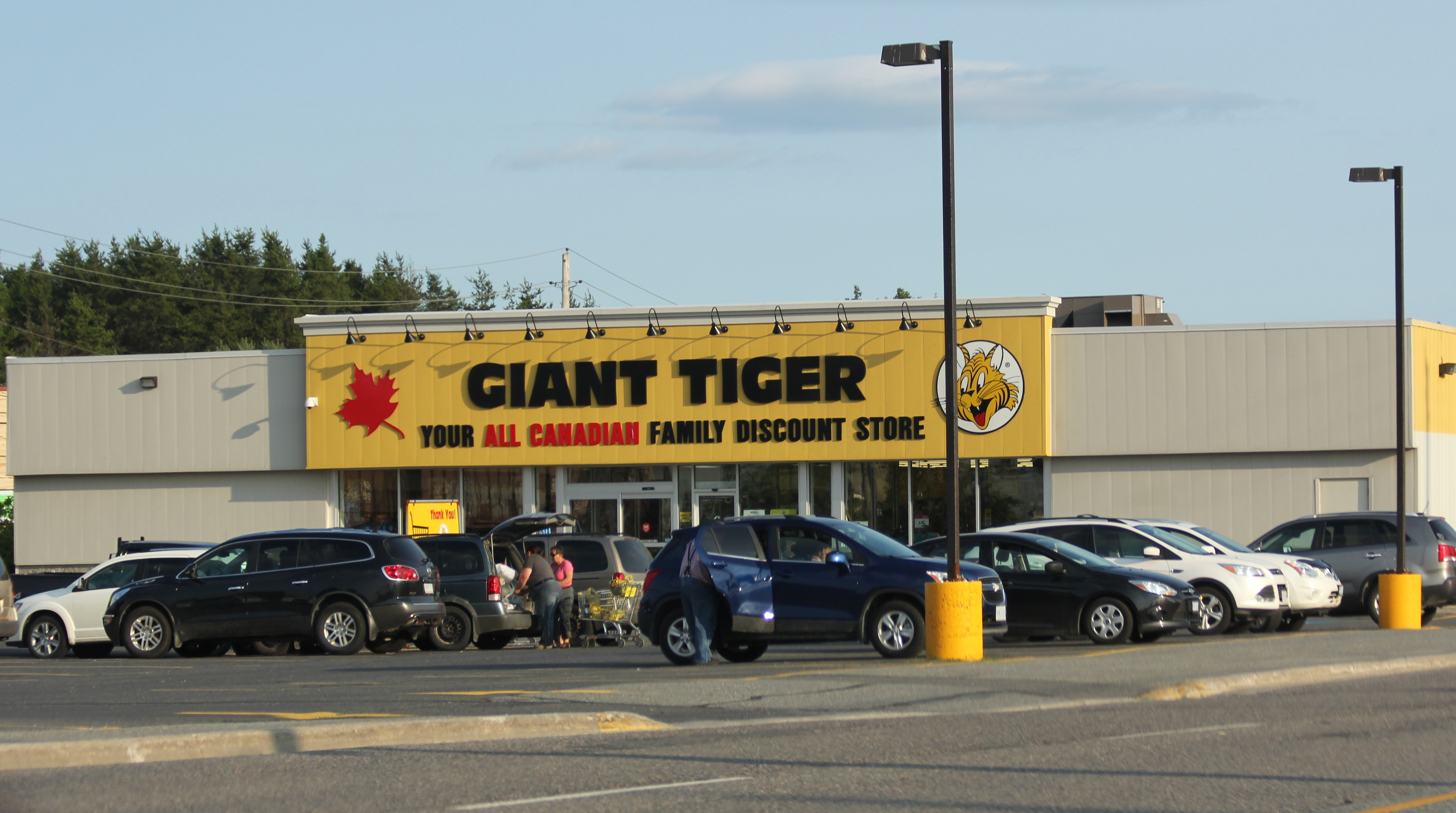
- A Giant Tiger store in Espanola, Ontario
- Company type: Private
- Industry: Retail
- Founded: 1961; 65 years ago
- Founder: Gordon Reid
- Headquarters: 2480 Walkley Road; Ottawa, Ontario; K1G 6A9
- Key people: Gino DiGioacchino (CEO)
- Number of employees: 8,000
- Website: www.gianttiger.com

Giant Tiger Stores Limited is a Canadian discount store chain which operates over 260 stores across Canada. The company's stores operate under the Giant Tiger banner in Alberta, Manitoba, New Brunswick, Nova Scotia, Ontario, Prince Edward Island and Saskatchewan; under the GTExpress and Scott's Discount banners in Ontario and under the Tigre Géant banner in Quebec.

As of 2021, the chain reported annual sales of roughly $2 billion and employed about 10,000 people. Its headquarters are located on Walkley Road in Ottawa. In 2018, the company opened a 600,000-square-foot (55,742 m^{2}) distribution centre in Johnstown, halfway between Montreal and Toronto, at the intersection of Ontario's Highway 401 and Highway 416.

It is a participant in the voluntary Scanner Price Accuracy Code managed by the Retail Council of Canada.

== Business model ==
=== Inspiration ===
In the mid and late 1940s, Giant Tiger founder Gordon Reid, who was then in his early twenties, was a travelling salesman for an importer in the United States. In the American Midwest, Reid first saw discount stores. Discount stores were a new concept at the time. He was particularly impressed by Uncle Bill's, a chain headquartered in Cleveland, Ohio, which was one of his clients. The discount store concept did not yet exist in Canada, and it therefore represented a business opportunity.

Reid reports that he was also inspired by Frank Woolworth’s continent-wide success, half a century earlier, in creating hundreds of profitable Five-and-Dime stores. Reid’s own retail experience, dating back to his first job as a teenager, had been in department stores rather than in discount, but his mother had worked behind the luncheon counter at a Woolworth’s in downtown Montreal.

Reid stated, four decades later, that he had believed, even at this early stage, that it would be possible to build a Canada-wide chain based on this model. Asked by a reporter whether he had ever imagined that Giant Tiger would eventually have the success it was then enjoying, Reid stated, "Yes. That was the original intention. The idea for the business came when I was a travelling salesman. I saw the discounters growing. My original inspiration was the F. W. Woolworth Co., obviously that was a big chain. So this was always the plan."

==== Ownership structure ====
Key head office personnel were co-owners of Giant Tiger Stores Limited. Initially, Giant Tiger’s head office was quite small; and ownership was therefore shared among a small number of people. By 1980, ownership had been shared between Reid and ten key employees. Gordon Reid has stated that Canada’s agricultural cooperative movement was his inspiration for this innovation. Making his employees into part-owners of the company ensured that, as in the co-op movement, all employees would share a common interest in maximizing profits.

==== Franchise system ====
Giant Tiger #1, opened in Ottawa's historic Byward Market in 1961, was company-owned. The first franchised Giant Tiger was opened by Jean-Guy Desjardins in Maniwaki in 1968. As Reid would explain it forty years later, from the moment the change was made, "the [Maniwaki] store made money and I didn't have to do anything. [Jean-Guy Desjardins] did the advertising, he found the location, he merchandised it to suit his customers, he did everything ... And, I thought, 'by golly, that's a good system.'"

Because the chain most often has been shoehorned into existing spaces now too small for the major big-box store or hypermarket chains, individual store managers are given wide leeway in ordering decisions and are free to devote their limited floor space to items which sell well in their local market. This flexibility, and a distribution system in which stores are restocked daily, allows stores to "pull" only the inventory they immediately need and facilitates greater turnover per square foot of scarce retail space.

In 2010, Reid reported that the issuing of no-cost franchises to experienced retailers "was a great way to get experienced people. Over the years we had a lot come from Woolworth, Kresge, Kmart and later Zellers." In the same interview, Reid stated that over twenty Giant Tiger franchises are now run by former Walmart employees, most of whom had been attracted by the same franchise system that he had introduced decades earlier.

== History ==
=== Number of stores ===
Gordon Reid opened the first Giant Tiger store, on George Street in Ottawa’s Byward Market, on May 13, 1961, with a $15,000 investment. First year sales of $139,781 were far lower than Reid had anticipated, and by the end of 1962, he decided to close the store. Unexpectedly, the rush of customers attracted by his going out of business sale provided enough cash flow to keep the business afloat.

Although the store survived, expansion was slow. A second location, in the small town of Brockville, was not opened until 1965. By the time, of the company's tenth anniversary, in 1971, it still had only six stores.

As of 2018, there are 230 stores, the most recent three being opened on October 12, 2018, in Saskatoon, Windsor and Hamilton. The 2015, withdrawal of Target Canada from the marketplace presented an expansion opportunity for Giant Tiger. Its first acquisition of a Target store occurred in Fergus, Ontario, where 16,500 square feet (1,530 m^{2}) of an approximately 100,000 square feet (9,300 m^{2}) large Target store was acquired by Giant Tiger. This location opened in the spring of 2016.

=== Geographic expansion ===
In 2001, Giant Tiger and The North West Company (NWC) signed a 30-year Master Franchise Agreement that grants NWC the exclusive right to open and operate 72 Giant Tiger stores in western Canada by 2032. In 2013, thirty-one of these stores were open and NWC was eyeing expansion into older city neighbourhoods and rural towns too small to support a Target or Walmart.

The chain has undertaken a major expansion in the Greater Toronto Area since 2005. It has opened seven stores in Bradford, Brampton, Markham (now closed), Newmarket, Scarborough and Etobicoke.

The 200th Giant Tiger store opened in Nova Scotia in October 2010.

In 2004, Giant Tiger opened a single store in Potsdam, New York, its first (and only) in the United States. This store closed during the Great Recession in 2009.

=== Franchising ===
In 1968, Giant Tiger opened its first franchise stores, which now account for the majority of locations. The goal was to better serve the customer by having local owners in the stores.

Between 2001 and 2020, The North West Company operated all of Giant Tiger's locations in western Canada under a single master franchise agreement. In March 2020, The North West Company announced that it would sell 34 of its 46 franchises to Giant Tiger, while closing six underperforming locations, maintaining five in northern markets, and converting one (Prince Albert) to a different banner.

=== New brands/trade names ===
In 1977, Giant Tiger established Chez Tante Marie stores in Hull and Gatineau, Quebec. The Hull store closed in 2015. Another Chez Tante Marie store existed in Lachute, Quebec; this store has since been rebranded as Tigre Géant. In 2017, the last Chez Tante Marie store, in Gatineau, was rebranded as Tigre Géant.

In 1996, the Scott's Discount brand was launched as an alternative format for smaller stores.

In 2008, Giant Tiger opened its first GT Xpress outlet at a former Giant Tiger location in Ottawa's Hintonburg neighbourhood. GT Xpress stores are intended to service less mobile residents of densely populated neighbourhoods, so that residents will not have to leave the neighbourhood to shop at a big-box store. Because larger retail spaces are unavailable in such inner-city neighbourhoods, the merchandise selection at GTXpress stores is more limited than at a full-size Giant Tiger, let alone a big-box store. Traditional lines of Giant Tiger merchandise are further restricted to free up space for an expanded produce, dairy, deli and bakery section. Effectively, a GTXpress store is a discount version of a convenience store, characterized by a "focus on what the customer needs today, as opposed to [carrying a full assortment of] what the customer wants." As the ethnic makeup of individual inner-city neighbourhoods is likely to differ substantially, franchise owner at each GTXpress outlet will have the authority to tailor "product lines to cater to ethnic diversity in the area."

=== Trucking/warehousing ===
In 1987, Giant Tiger launched its own trucking fleet (known internally as Tiger Trucking) to make regular shipments from the warehouse to stores. In 1999, it was reported that the company's trucks were making deliveries to each store three times a week. In 2001, Reid reported that deliveries were taking place daily: "We have the most efficient shipping and distribution system in the general merchandise field ... It is equivalent to the grocery stores. We deliver to stores five times per week. There is no one else in the general merchandise industry that does that and we do it with our own trucks."

On May 31, 1996, Giant Tiger purchased and took possession of a 29,000 m^{2} (310,000 sq ft) distribution centre on Walkley Road in Ottawa, previously occupied by Sears Canada. The company's headquarters moved to this location later the same year.

In December 2005, Giant Tiger opened a new 3,700 m^{2} (40,000 sq ft) distribution centre for frozen and refrigerated products in Brockville, Ontario.

In 2018, the company opened a 600,000-square-foot (55,742 m^{2}) distribution centre in Johnstown, halfway between Montreal and Toronto, at the intersection of Ontario's Highway 401 and Highway 416.

=== Changes in management structure and key personnel ===
In October 2010, Reid stepped down as chief executive officer of Giant Tiger, in favour of Andy Gross, a 25-year veteran with the chain, who started working as a buyer when there were fewer than thirty stores. Gross had, by this time, already inherited the presidency from Jeff York. Gross decided to retire effective August 1, 2014, and was then replaced as president and COO by Greg Farrell, who in turn was replaced on March 1, 2015, by former Zellers president and COO Thomas Haig. As of 2015, Reid retains the posts of chairman of the board and CEO. A proposal to sell the company was briefly raised in October 2013, but soon abandoned.

== See also ==
- List of Canadian department stores
