= Carleton—Mississippi Mills =

Former federal electoral district in Ontario, Canada

Ontario electoral district
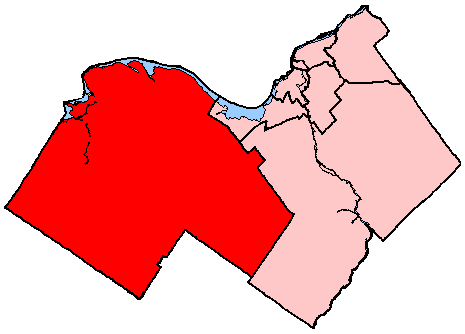
- Carleton–Mississippi Mills in relation to other Ottawa-area electoral districts

Defunct federal electoral district
- Legislature: House of Commons
- District created: 1987
- District abolished: 2013
- First contested: 1988
- Last contested: 2011
- District webpage: profile, map

Demographics
- Population (2011): 149,769
- Electors (2011): 99,002
- Area (km²): 1,550.93
- Census division(s): Lanark, Ottawa
- Census subdivision(s): Ottawa, Mississippi Mills

Carleton—Mississippi Mills (formerly known as Lanark—Carleton and Carleton—Lanark) was a federal electoral district in Ontario, Canada, that was represented in the House of Commons of Canada from 1988 to 2015.

This riding was created in 1987 from parts of Lanark—Renfrew—Carleton and Nepean—Carleton ridings. Initially it was named "Carleton–Lanark", and the name was changed to "Lanark–Carleton" as of September 1, 2004. The riding consists of the former Townships of Ramsay and Pakenham in the Town of Mississippi Mills, the former Townships of Goulbourn and West Carleton, and the former city of Kanata all in the city of Ottawa.

Initially, the boundaries of the riding were contentious. According to a report of the House of Commons committee that reviewed all new riding boundaries created in that year's redistribution of ridings, "the Township of Mississippi Mills has strenuously protested being placed within Carleton–Lanark. It feels it does not belong to, and should not be attached to, an Ottawa-focused riding." In May 2004, Mississippi Mills town council voted to be moved out of the riding and into the same riding as the rest of Lanark County. Over 1,000 residents of the township mailed postcards to the Speaker of the House of Commons protesting the new boundaries.

Gordon O'Connor of the Conservative Party of Canada was the riding's Member of Parliament from 2004 to 2015. During this time, he served as the Minister of National Revenue and the Minister of National Defence.

Following the Canadian federal electoral redistribution, 2012, the riding was dissolved. The bulk of the riding—nearly all of the Ottawa portion—became part of Kanata—Carleton, while a smaller portion was transferred to Carleton. Mississippi Mills became part of Lanark—Frontenac—Kingston.

== Members of Parliament ==
Parliament	Years	Member	Party
Carleton—Lanark; Riding created from Lanark—Renfrew—Carleton and Nepean—Carleton
34th	1988–1993	Paul Dick	Progressive Conservative
35th	1993–1997	Ian Murray	Liberal
36th	1997–2000	Ian Murray	Liberal
37th	2000–2003	Scott Reid	Alliance
37th	2003–2004	Scott Reid	Conservative
Riding renamed — Carleton—Mississippi Mills
38th	2004–2006	Gordon O'Connor	Conservative
39th	2006–2008	Gordon O'Connor	Conservative
40th	2008–2011	Gordon O'Connor	Conservative
41st	2011–2015	Gordon O'Connor	Conservative
Riding dissolved into Kanata—Carleton, Carleton, and Lanark—Frontenac—Kingston

== Election results ==
=== Carleton—Mississippi Mills ===
2011 Canadian federal election
Party	Candidate	Votes	%	±%	Expenditures
Conservative	Gordon O'Connor	43,723	56.95	-0.82	–
Liberal	Karen McCrimmon	18,393	23.96	+1.62	–
New Democratic	Erin Peters	11,223	14.62	+4.98	–
Green	John Hogg	3,434	4.47	-5.76	–
Total valid votes/Expense limit		76,773	100.00		–
Total rejected ballots		196	0.25	–	
Turnout		76,969	72.77	+3.61	
Eligible voters		105,770	–	–	
Conservative hold		Swing		-1.22	

2008 Canadian federal election
Party	Candidate	Votes	%	±%	Expenditures
Conservative	Gordon O'Connor	39,433	57.77	+1.5	$85,039
Liberal	Justin Mackinnon	15,254	22.34	-1.2	$95,575
Green	Jake Cole	6,983	10.23	+3.7	$16,910
New Democratic	Paul Arbour	6,583	9.64	-2.8	$14,025
Total valid votes/Expense limit		61,575	100.00		$97,029
Total rejected ballots		–	–	–	
Turnout		68,469	69.16	–	

2006 Canadian federal election
Party	Candidate	Votes	%	±%	Expenditures
Conservative	Gordon O'Connor	39,004	56.2	+6.2	$77,114
Liberal	Isabel Metcalfe	16,360	23.6	-9.6	$71,930
New Democratic	Tasha Bridgen	8,677	12.5	+2.2	$14,836
Green	Jake Cole	4,544	6.5	+0.9	$6,225
Marijuana	George Kolaczunski	426	0.6		$0
Progressive Canadian	Tracy Parsons	408	0.6		$1,238
Total valid votes/Expense limit		69,419	100.0		

=== Carleton—Lanark ===
2004 Canadian federal election
Party	Candidate	Votes	%	±%
Conservative	Gordon O'Connor	32,664	50.0	-8.5
Liberal	Dan Wicklum	22,185	34.0	-2.0
New Democratic	Rick Prashaw	6,758	10.4	+7.3
Green	Stewart Langstaff	3,665	5.6	+4.2
Total valid votes		65,272	100.0	

Note: Conservative vote is compared to the total of the Canadian Alliance vote and Progressive Conservative vote in 2000 election.

=== Lanark—Carleton ===
2000 Canadian federal election
Party	Candidate	Votes	%	±%
Alliance	Scott Reid	24,670	38.9	+11.9
Liberal	Ian Murray	22,812	36.0	-9.3
Progressive Conservative	Bryan Brulotte	12,430	19.6	-1.7
New Democratic	Theresa Kiefer	1,946	3.1	-1.8
Green	Stuart Langstaff	871	1.4	0.6
Canadian Action	Ross Elliott	388	0.6	0.1
Independent	John Baranyi	150	0.2	
Natural Law	Britt Roberts	107	0.2	-0.1
Total valid votes		–	100.0	
Total valid votes		63,374	100.0	

Note: Canadian Alliance vote is compared to the Reform vote in 1997 election.

1997 Canadian federal election
Party	Candidate	Votes	%	±%
Liberal	Ian Murray	28,151	45.3	-4.2
Reform	Darrel Reid	16,765	27.0	4.7
Progressive Conservative	Bryce Grayson Bell	13,213	21.3	-2.2
New Democratic	Gail Myles	3,022	4.9	+2.5
Green	Susan Brandum	463	0.7	+0.3
Canadian Action	Gerald W. Lepage	318	0.5	
Natural Law	Britt Roberts	181	0.3	-0.1
Total valid votes		–	100.0	
Total valid votes		62,113	100.0	

1993 Canadian federal election
Party	Candidate	Votes	%	±%
Liberal	Ian Murray	35,051	49.5	+13.9
Progressive Conservative	Paul Dick	16,604	23.5	-24.6
Reform	Ron MacDonald	15,766	22.3	
New Democratic	Judie McSkimmings	1,689	2.4	-12.3
National	Jacques Rubacha	926	1.3	
Green	Stephen Johns	329	0.5	
Natural Law	Britt Roberts	264	0.4	
Libertarian	Barbara Rowe	99	0.1	
Abolitionist	Bracken Begley	62	0.1	
Total valid votes		70,790	100.0	

1988 Canadian federal election
Party	Candidate	Votes	%
Progressive Conservative	Paul Dick	27,379	48.0
Liberal	Janet Marshall	20,275	35.6
New Democratic	Bill Cox	8,359	14.7
Confederation of Regions	Robert Stratton	981	1.7
Total valid votes		56,994	100.0

== See also ==
- List of Canadian electoral districts
- Historical federal electoral districts of Canada
