= William Thoburn =

William Thoburn may refer to:

- William Thoburn (politician), Canadian woollen manufacturer and politician in the province of Ontario
- William Thoburn (rower), Canadian Olympic rower
