= Lanark North (provincial electoral district) =

Electoral district in Ontario, Canada

Ontario electoral district

Defunct provincial electoral district
- Legislature: Legislative Assembly of Ontario
- District created: 1867
- District abolished: 1933
- First contested: 1867
- Last contested: 1929

Lanark North was an electoral riding in Ontario, Canada. It was created in 1867 at the time of confederation and was abolished in 1933 before the 1934 election.

== Members of Provincial Parliament ==
Lanark North
Assembly	Years	Member	Party
1st	1867–1871	Daniel Galbraith	Liberal
2nd	1871–1872	Daniel Galbraith	Liberal
2nd	1872–1874	William Clyde Caldwell	Liberal
3rd	1875–1879	William Mostyn	Conservative
4th	1879–1883	William Clyde Caldwell	Liberal
5th	1883–1886	William Clyde Caldwell	Liberal
6th	1886–1888	Daniel Hilliard	Liberal
6th	1888–1890	William Clyde Caldwell	Liberal
7th	1890–1894	William Clyde Caldwell	Liberal
8th	1894–1898	Richard Franklin Preston	Conservative
9th	1898–1902	William Clyde Caldwell	Liberal
10th	1902–1905	William Clyde Caldwell	Liberal
11th	1905–1908	Richard Franklin Preston	Conservative
12th	1908–1911	Richard Franklin Preston	Conservative
13th	1911–1914	Richard Franklin Preston	Conservative
14th	1914–1919	Richard Franklin Preston	Conservative
15th	1919–1923	Hiram McCreary	United Farmers
16th	1923–1926	Thomas Alfred Thompson	Conservative
17th	1926–1928	Thomas Alfred Thompson	Conservative
18th	1929–1934	John Alexander Craig	Conservative
Sourced from the Ontario Legislative Assembly
Merged into Lanark before 1934 election

== Election results ==
1929 Ontario general election
Party	Candidate	Votes	%	±%
Conservative	John Alexander Craig	4,038	56.64	+4.94
Liberal	Albert Downing	3,091	43.36	–
Total valid votes		7,129	99.65	
Total rejected ballots		25	0.35	+0.01
Turnout		7,154	73.69	+3.08
Eligible voters		9,708		
Conservative hold		Swing		+2.47
Source: Elections Ontario

1926 Ontario general election
Party	Candidate	Votes	%	±%
Conservative	Thomas Alfred Thompson	3,589	51.70	–2.62
Liberal–Progressive	William R. Caldwell	3,353	48.30	–
Total valid votes		6,942	99.66	
Total rejected ballots		24	0.34	–0.14
Turnout		6,966	70.61	+5.48
Eligible voters		9,865		
Conservative hold		Swing		–1.31
Source: Elections Ontario

1923 Ontario general election
Party	Candidate	Votes	%	±%
Conservative	Thomas Alfred Thompson	3,339	54.32	+14.64
United Farmers	Hiram McCreary	2,808	45.68	+4.83
Total valid votes		6,147	99.51	
Total rejected ballots		30	0.49	–2.21
Turnout		6,177	65.14	–12.70
Eligible voters		9,483		
Conservative gain from United Farmers		Swing		+4.91
Source: Elections Ontario

1919 Ontario general election
Party	Candidate	Votes	%	±%
United Farmers	Hiram McCreary	2,881	40.85	–
Conservative	Richard Franklin Preston	2,798	39.68	–12.21
Liberal	Christopher Forbes	1,373	19.47	–28.65
Total valid votes		7,052	97.31	
Total rejected ballots		195	2.69	+1.98
Turnout		7,247	77.84	–12.98
Eligible voters		9,310		
United Farmers gain from Conservative		Swing		+14.32
Source: Elections Ontario

1914 Ontario general election
Party	Candidate	Votes	%	±%
Conservative	Richard Franklin Preston	1,666	51.88	–4.37
Liberal	Robert Patterson	1,545	48.12	+4.37
Total valid votes		3,211	99.29	
Total rejected ballots		23	0.71	–
Turnout		3,234	90.82	–
Eligible voters		3,561		
Conservative hold		Swing		–4.37
Source: Elections Ontario

1911 Ontario general election
Party	Candidate	Votes
Conservative	Richard Franklin Preston	acclaimed
Source: Elections Ontario

1908 Ontario general election
Party	Candidate	Votes	%	±%
Conservative	Richard Franklin Preston	2,017	56.61	–0.98
Liberal	Robert Ayr Galbraith	1,546	43.39	+0.98
Total valid votes		3,563	99.47	
Total rejected ballots		19	0.53	+0.31
Turnout		3,582	90.11	+14.50
Eligible voters		3,975		
Conservative hold		Swing		–0.98
Source: Elections Ontario

1905 Ontario general election
Party	Candidate	Votes	%	±%
Conservative	Richard Franklin Preston	1,810	57.59	+8.72
Liberal	A. H. Edwards	1,333	42.41	–8.72
Total valid votes		3,143	99.78	
Total rejected ballots		7	0.22	–0.56
Turnout		3,150	75.61	–6.17
Eligible voters		4,166		
Conservative gain from Liberal		Swing		+8.72
Source: Elections Ontario

1902 Ontario general election
Party	Candidate	Votes	%	±%
Liberal	William Clyde Caldwell	1,811	51.13	–1.25
Conservative	A. M. Greig	1,731	48.87	+1.25
Total valid votes		3,542	99.22	
Total rejected ballots		28	0.78	+0.39
Turnout		3,570	81.79	–1.14
Eligible voters		4,365		
Liberal hold		Swing		–1.25
Source: Elections Ontario

1898 Ontario general election
Party	Candidate	Votes	%	±%
Liberal	William Clyde Caldwell	1,989	52.38	+2.82
Conservative	Richard Franklin Preston	1,808	47.62	–2.82
Total valid votes		3,797	99.61	
Total rejected ballots		15	0.39	–0.24
Turnout		3,812	82.92	+7.85
Eligible voters		4,597		
Liberal gain from Conservative		Swing		+2.82
Source: Elections Ontario

1894 Ontario general election
Party	Candidate	Votes	%	±%
Conservative	Richard Franklin Preston	1,499	50.44	+3.74
Liberal	William Clyde Caldwell	1,473	49.56	–3.74
Total valid votes		2,972	99.36	
Total rejected ballots		19	0.64	+0.04
Turnout		2,991	75.08	+3.80
Eligible voters		3,984		
Conservative gain from Liberal Equal Rights		Swing		+3.74
Source: Elections Ontario

1890 Ontario general election
Party	Candidate	Votes	%	±%
Liberal Equal Rights	William Clyde Caldwell	1,525	53.30	–
Conservative	Richard Franklin Preston	1,336	46.70	–
Total valid votes		2,861	99.41	
Total rejected ballots		17	0.59	–
Turnout		2,878	71.27	–
Eligible voters		4,038		
Liberal Equal Rights hold		Swing		–
Source: Elections Ontario

Ontario provincial by-election, October 4, 1888 Death of Daniel Hilliard
Party	Candidate	Votes
Liberal	William Clyde Caldwell	acclaimed
Source: Elections Ontario

1886 Ontario general election
Party	Candidate	Votes	%	±%
Liberal	Daniel Hilliard	1,392	51.71	–2.49
Conservative	J. Donald	1,300	48.29	+2.49
Total valid votes		2,692	99.52	
Total rejected ballots		13	0.48	+0.22
Turnout		2,705	67.24	–5.45
Eligible voters		4,023		
Liberal hold		Swing		–2.49
Source: Elections Ontario

1883 Ontario general election
Party	Candidate	Votes	%	±%
Liberal	William Clyde Caldwell	1,247	54.19	–1.84
Conservative	Bennett Rosamond	1,054	45.81	+1.84
Total valid votes		2,301	99.74	
Total rejected ballots		6	0.26	+0.26
Turnout		2,307	72.68	–0.75
Eligible voters		3,174		
Liberal hold		Swing		–1.84
Source: Elections Ontario

1879 Ontario general election
Party	Candidate	Votes	%	±%
Liberal	William Clyde Caldwell	1,309	56.04	+6.76
Conservative	William Mostyn	1,027	43.96	−6.76
Total valid votes		2,336	73.44	−6.64
Eligible voters		3,181		
Liberal gain from Conservative		Swing		+6.76
Source: Elections Ontario

1875 Ontario general election
Party	Candidate	Votes	%	±%
Conservative	William Mostyn	913	50.72	+2.52
Liberal	William Clyde Caldwell	887	49.28	−2.52
Turnout		1,800	80.07	
Eligible voters		2,248		
Conservative gain from Liberal		Swing		+2.52
Source: Elections Ontario

Ontario provincial by-election, August 1872 Resignation of Daniel Galbraith
Party	Candidate	Votes	%
Liberal	William Clyde Caldwell	619	51.80
Conservative	Bennett Rosamond	576	48.20
Total valid votes		1,195	100.0
Liberal hold			
Source: History of the Electoral Districts, Legislatures and Ministries of the Province of Ontario

1871 Ontario general election
Party	Candidate	Votes
Liberal	Daniel Galbraith	Acclaimed
Source: Elections Ontario

1867 Ontario general election
Party	Candidate	Votes
Liberal	Daniel Galbraith	Acclaimed
Source: Elections Ontario
