= Daniel Galbraith (Ontario politician) =

Canadian politician

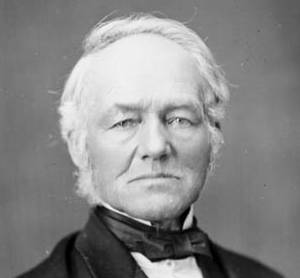

Member of Parliament for Lanark North
- In office 1872–1879
- Preceded by: William McDougall
- Succeeded by: Donald Greenfield MacDonell

Ontario MPP
- In office 1867–1872
- Preceded by: Riding established
- Succeeded by: William Clyde Caldwell
- Constituency: Lanark North

Personal details
- Born: 1 February 1813 Glasgow, Scotland
- Died: 17 December 1879 (aged 66) Almonte, Ontario
- Party: Liberal
- Other political affiliations: Ontario Liberal Party
- Spouse: Janet McFarlane

Daniel Galbraith (1 February 1813 – 17 December 1879) was a Canadian farmer and political figure in the province of Ontario. He represented Lanark North as a Liberal in the Legislative Assembly of Ontario from 1867 to 1872 and in Lanark North in the House of Commons of Canada from 1872 to 1879.

He was born in Glasgow, Scotland in 1813 and came to Lanark County with his family in 1821. In January 1850, he married Janet McFarlane. and together they had nine children. He served as reeve for Ramsay Township and also served as warden for Lanark County. Galbraith was elected to the Ontario legislature in 1867 and reelected in 1871. He resigned his seat in 1872 to run for a seat in the federal parliament. He was also director of the Brockville and Ottawa Railway.

The land he purchased in 1855 is the rural community of Galbraith, located at Rae Road and Concession 5 in the former Ramsay Township. Upon his death in 1879, his son Robert took over the land, Robert then passing it to his sister Phoebe, Mrs. Robert Black, in the latter part of the century. In 1923, the land was sold to Alex Munro from Darling Township, then in 1944 to Alex’s son-in-law Herbert Hazelwood. Today, the community of Galbraith is a sparse collection of farm homes and a brick bungalow on the site where the yellow schoolhouse once stood. The first one room Galbraith School, S.S. No. 5 Ramsay, was on a half acre of land at the top of the hill, which Mr. Galbraith had sold to the school trustees in 1870 for $1.00. He also gave land for a second school in 1875 on the opposite side of the road, the yellow schoolhouse. This school operated until 1969 when the Government of Ontario mandated the consolidation of county schools and bussed students to nearby Almonte or Carleton Place.

He died while still in office in 1879, and is buried in the Auld Kirk Cemetery at Almonte.

== Electoral history ==
1867 Ontario general election: Lanark North
Party	Candidate	Votes
Liberal	Daniel Galbraith	Acclaimed
Source: Elections Ontario

1871 Ontario general election: Lanark North
Party	Candidate	Votes
Liberal	Daniel Galbraith	Acclaimed
Source: Elections Ontario
