= HCCS =

HCCS can refer to:

- Houston City College System, previously known as Houston Community College System
- Holmes Chapel Comprehensive School
- Heritage Community Christian School (Brockville, Ontario)
- HCCS (gene) and Cytochrome c-type heme lyase enzyme.
