= Lanark North =

Former federal electoral district in Ontario, Canada

Ontario electoral district

Defunct federal electoral district
- Legislature: House of Commons
- District created: 1867
- District abolished: 1914
- First contested: 1867
- Last contested: 1911

Lanark North was a federal electoral district represented in the House of Commons of Canada from 1867 to 1917. It was located in the province of Ontario. It was created by the British North America Act 1867 which divided the County of Lanark into two ridings: Lanark South and Lanark North.

In 1882, the North Riding of Lanark was defined to consist of the townships of Ramsay, Pakenham, Darling, Dalhousie, North Sherbrooke, Lavant, Fitzroy, Huntley and Lanark, the Town of Almonte, and the Village of Lanark.

In 1903, the village of Carleton Place was added to the riding, and the townships of Fitzroy and Huntley were excluded.

The electoral district was abolished in 1914 when it was merged into Lanark riding.

== Members of Parliament ==
This riding has elected the following members of Parliament:

Parliament	Years	Member	Party
1st	1867–1872	William McDougall	Liberal–Conservative
2nd	1872–1874	Daniel Galbraith	Liberal
3rd	1874–1878	Daniel Galbraith	Liberal
4th	1878–1879	Daniel Galbraith	Liberal
4th	1880–1882	Donald Greenfield MacDonell	Liberal
5th	1882–1887	Joseph Jamieson	Conservative
6th	1887–1891	Joseph Jamieson	Conservative
7th	1891–1891	Joseph Jamieson	Conservative
7th	1891–1896	Bennett Rosamond	Conservative
8th	1896–1900	Bennett Rosamond	Conservative
9th	1900–1904	Bennett Rosamond	Conservative
10th	1904–1908	Thomas Boyd Caldwell	Liberal
11th	1908–1911	William Thoburn	Conservative
12th	1911–1917	William Thoburn	Conservative
Riding dissolved into Lanark

== Election history ==
1867 Canadian federal election
Party	Candidate	Votes
Liberal–Conservative	William McDougall	acclaimed

1872 Canadian federal election
Party	Candidate	Votes
Liberal	Daniel Galbraith	559
Unknown	Bennett Rosamond	418
Liberal–Conservative	William McDougall	276

1874 Canadian federal election
Party	Candidate	Votes
Liberal	Daniel Galbraith	acclaimed

1878 Canadian federal election
Party	Candidate	Votes
Liberal	Daniel Galbraith	992
Conservative	Joseph Jamieson	949

On Mr. Galbraith's death, 17 December 1879:

By-election on 22 January 1880
Party	Candidate	Votes
Liberal	Donald Greenfield McDonell	1,107
Conservative	Joseph Jamieson	1,009

1882 Canadian federal election
Party	Candidate	Votes
Conservative	Joseph Jamieson	1,382
Liberal	D. G. McDonell	1,313

1887 Canadian federal election
Party	Candidate	Votes
Conservative	Jos. Jamieson	1,739
Liberal	D. G. MacDonnell	1,634

1891 Canadian federal election
Party	Candidate	Votes
Conservative	Joseph Jamieson	1,723
Liberal	Donald M. Fraser	1,422

On Mr. Jamieson being appointed Junior County Judge, Wellington County, 8 December 1891:

By-election on 31 December 1891
Party	Candidate	Votes
Conservative	Bennett Rosamond	acclaimed

1896 Canadian federal election
Party	Candidate	Votes
Conservative	Bennett Rosamond	1,757
Patrons of Industry	James Miller	1,481
McCarthyite	David McElroy	280

1900 Canadian federal election
Party	Candidate	Votes
Conservative	Bennett Rosamond	1,848
Liberal	Thomas B. Caldwell	1,841

1904 Canadian federal election
Party	Candidate	Votes
Liberal	Thomas Boyd Caldwell	1,709
Conservative	Richard F. Preston	1,656

1908 Canadian federal election
Party	Candidate	Votes
Conservative	William Thoburn	1,637
Liberal	Thomas Boyd Caldwell	1,631

1911 Canadian federal election
Party	Candidate	Votes
Conservative	William Thoburn	1,613
Liberal	Thomas Boyd Caldwell	1,386

== See also ==
- List of Canadian electoral districts
- Historical federal electoral districts of Canada
