= Thomas Boyd Caldwell =

Canadian politician

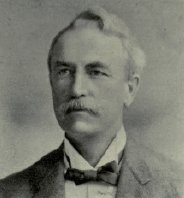

Member of the Canadian Parliament for Lanark North
- In office 1904–1908
- Preceded by: Bennett Rosamond
- Succeeded by: William Thoburn

Personal details
- Born: February 22, 1856 Lanark, Canada West
- Died: March 26, 1932 (aged 76)
- Party: Liberal

Thomas Boyd Caldwell (February 22, 1856 – March 26, 1932) was a Canadian politician.

Born in Lanark, Canada West, the son of Boyd Caldwell and Dinah Waugh, Caldwell was educated at the Lanark Public School and the Kingston Collegiate Institute. A woolen manufacturer, he was elected to the House of Commons of Canada for the electoral district of Lanark North in the 1904 federal election. A Liberal, he was defeated in 1900 (by only 7 votes), 1908 (by only 6 votes), and 1911. From 1883 to 1893, he was a Captain and Paymaster with the 42nd Lanark and Renfrew Battalion of Infantry.
