= Aquatarium (Ontario) =

- Established: 2016
- Location: Brockville, Ontario
- Coordinates: 44.58764°N 75.68273°W
- Type: Science; Natural history
- Website: aquatarium.ca

The Aquatarium is a non-profit interactive science and education museum located in Brockville, Ontario, Canada. The facility focuses on the history and ecology of the Thousand Islands region of the Saint Lawrence River.
