= William Clyde Caldwell =

Canadian politician

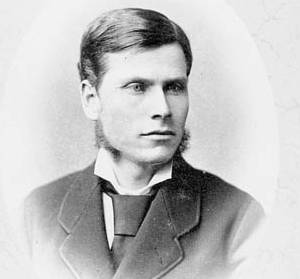

Ontario MPP
- In office 1898–1905
- Preceded by: Richard Franklin Preston
- Succeeded by: Richard Franklin Preston
- In office 1888–1894
- Preceded by: Daniel Hilliard
- Succeeded by: Richard Franklin Preston
- In office 1879–1886
- Preceded by: William Mostyn
- Succeeded by: Daniel Hilliard
- In office 1872–1874
- Preceded by: Daniel Galbraith
- Succeeded by: William Mostyn
- Constituency: Lanark North

Personal details
- Born: May 14, 1843 Lanark in Canada West
- Died: January 7, 1905 (aged 61) Lanark, Ontario
- Party: Liberal
- Spouse(s): Ida Virginia Cauldwell (1868-1869); Katherine Smith Falconer (m. 1871)
- Children: 7
- Occupation: Lumber merchant

William Clyde Caldwell (May 14, 1843 – January 7, 1905) was an Ontario businessman and political figure. He represented Lanark North in the Legislative Assembly of Ontario as a Liberal member four times from 1872 to 1875, 1879 to 1886, 1888 to 1894 and 1898 to 1905.

He was born William Caldwell in Lanark in Canada West in 1843. He worked in his father's timber company and later became a partner in the business. He received a Bachelor of Arts from Queen's College in 1866. Around 1872, he adopted the middle name Clyde, after the Clyde River in Lanark County where the family held timber limits, to distinguish himself from several other William Caldwells in the province. On his father's death, he inherited the company and several mills in Lanark. He became part-owner of a grist mill in Carleton Place and built a sawmill in Almonte. He also owned a woollen mill in Lanark. He was elected in an 1872 by-election to represent Lanark North in the Ontario legislature. In 1883, he moved to Kingston but kept property in Lanark. Caldwell was also a member of the Freemasons. He died in Lanark in 1905. Caldwell Street in Lanark is named after him.

== Electoral history ==
Ontario provincial by-election, August 1872: Lanark North Resignation of Daniel Galbraith
| Party | Candidate | Votes | % |
|---|---|---|---|
| Liberal | William Clyde Caldwell | 619 | 51.80 |
| Conservative | Bennett Rosamond | 576 | 48.20 |
| Total valid votes | | 1,195 | 100.0 |
| Liberal hold | | | |
Source: History of the Electoral Districts, Legislatures and Ministries of the Province of Ontario

1875 Ontario general election: Lanark North
| Party | Candidate | Votes | % | ±% |
|---|---|---|---|---|
| Conservative | William Mostyn | 913 | 50.72 | +2.52 |
| Liberal | William Clyde Caldwell | 887 | 49.28 | −2.52 |
| Turnout | | 1,800 | 80.07 | |
| Eligible voters | | 2,248 | | |
| Conservative gain from Liberal | | Swing | | +2.52 |
Source: Elections Ontario

1879 Ontario general election: Lanark North
| Party | Candidate | Votes | % | ±% |
|---|---|---|---|---|
| Liberal | William Clyde Caldwell | 1,309 | 56.04 | +6.76 |
| Conservative | William Mostyn | 1,027 | 43.96 | −6.76 |
| Total valid votes | | 2,336 | 73.44 | −6.64 |
| Eligible voters | | 3,181 | | |
| Liberal gain from Conservative | | Swing | | +6.76 |
Source: Elections Ontario
