= Brockville Tunnel =

Railway tunnel in Brockville, Ontario

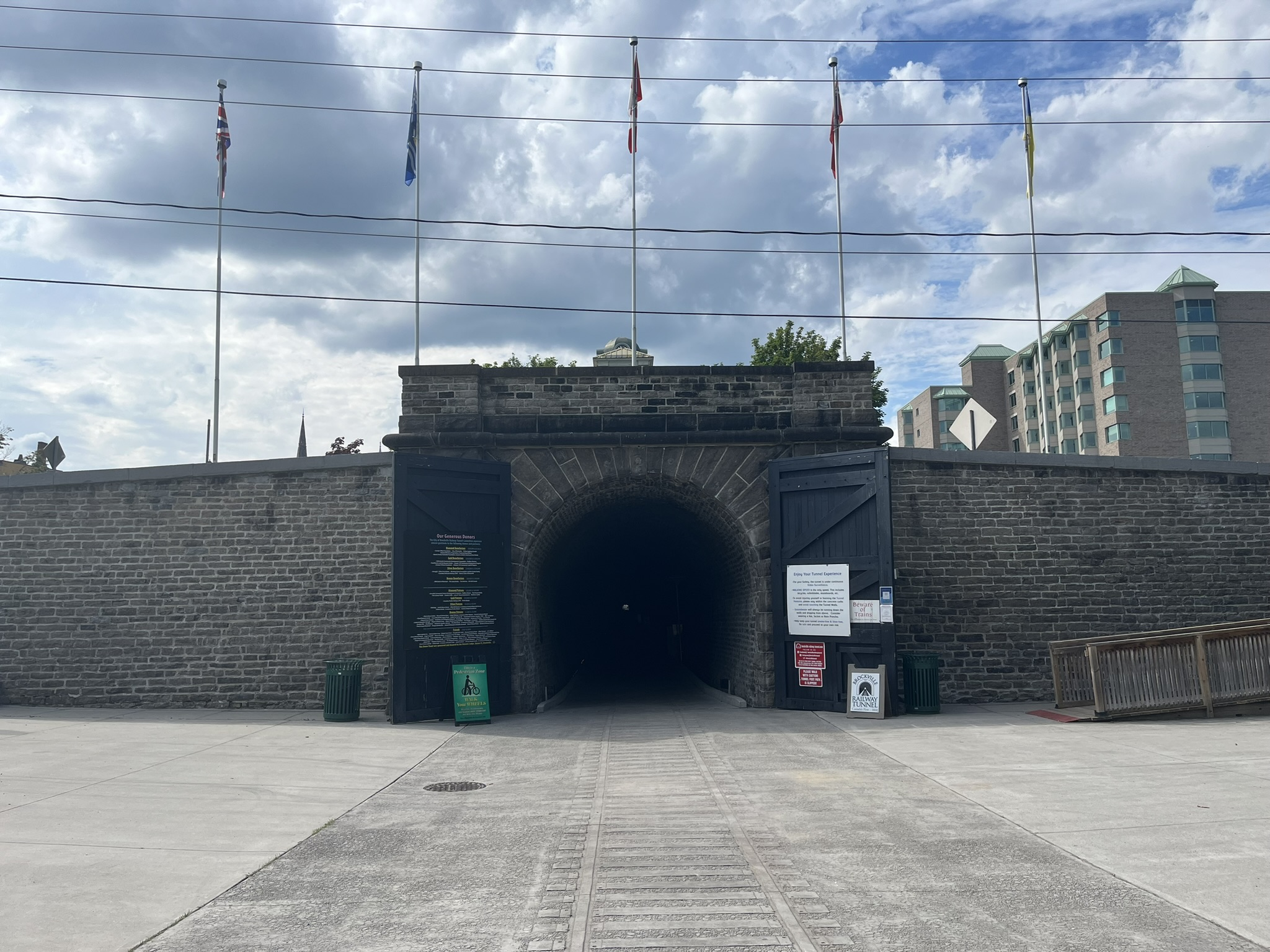
- The southern entrance of the Brockville Railway Tunnel, located south of Water St. within sight of the St. Lawrence River.
- Interactive map of Brockville Tunnel

Overview
- Official name: Brockville Railway Tunnel
- Coordinates: 44°35′23″N 75°40′55″W
- Status: Heritage
- System: Canadian Pacific Railway (former)

Operation
- Work began: 1854
- Opened: December 31, 1860
- Closed: 1970
- Owner: City of Brockville

Technical
- Length: 530 metres (1,740 ft)
- No. of tracks: Single (former)
- Width: 4.3 metres (14 ft)

The Brockville Railway Tunnel, also called the Brockville Tunnel, is a former railway tunnel located beneath the downtown of Brockville, Ontario, Canada. It is the first railway tunnel built in Canada; construction began in September 1854 and the first train passed through the tunnel on December 31, 1860. Since 2017 it has been opened to the public as a free seasonal tourist attraction.

The tunnel runs north from Water Street to Pearl Street, a distance of 527 metres (1,729 ft). It passes underneath what is now Brockville City Hall, built in 1863–64 as the Victoria Hall. It was built by the Brockville and Ottawa Railway (B&OR). The tunnel was designed to provide a railway link from the timber trade of the Ottawa Valley to the Brockville port facilities on the St. Lawrence River.

The B&OR, incorporated in 1853, ran from Brockville, through Smiths Falls, to Sand Point, near Arnprior, with a branch line from Smiths Falls to Perth. Its first B&OR train left Brockville on January 25, 1859, almost two years before finances permitted completion of the tunnel. The B&OR amalgamated in 1878 with the Canada Central Railway, which was absorbed in 1881 by the Canadian Pacific Railway (CPR).

The railway through the tunnel was later used by special height-shortened steam engines, and then diesel trains into the mid-1970s. The rails and ties were then sold and removed in the 1980s, and the railway tunnel was no longer used. In 1982, the tunnel was turned over to the City of Brockville by Marathon Realty, the real-estate wing of the CPR.

In 2016–17, the railway tunnel underwent a major interior rehabilitation to make it possible to travel safely through it on foot. Visitors can now walk from the south portal to the north portal, exiting at the north-end gorge and up a ramp to street level. Prior to the rehabilitation visitors were able to enter only at the south portal and walk a short distance underground.

The railway tunnel has received thousands of visitors since it opened completely on August 12, 2017. It now features a modern LED coloured light system, which is programmed in various ways, along with a recorded music track playing while one walks through.

Adjacent to the tunnel is a refurbished CPR caboose or van that was donated in 1987 to the city by the CPR. A detailed plaque, in both English and French, describes the details and story of how cabooses were formerly part of every train. Today the caboose operates as an escape room.

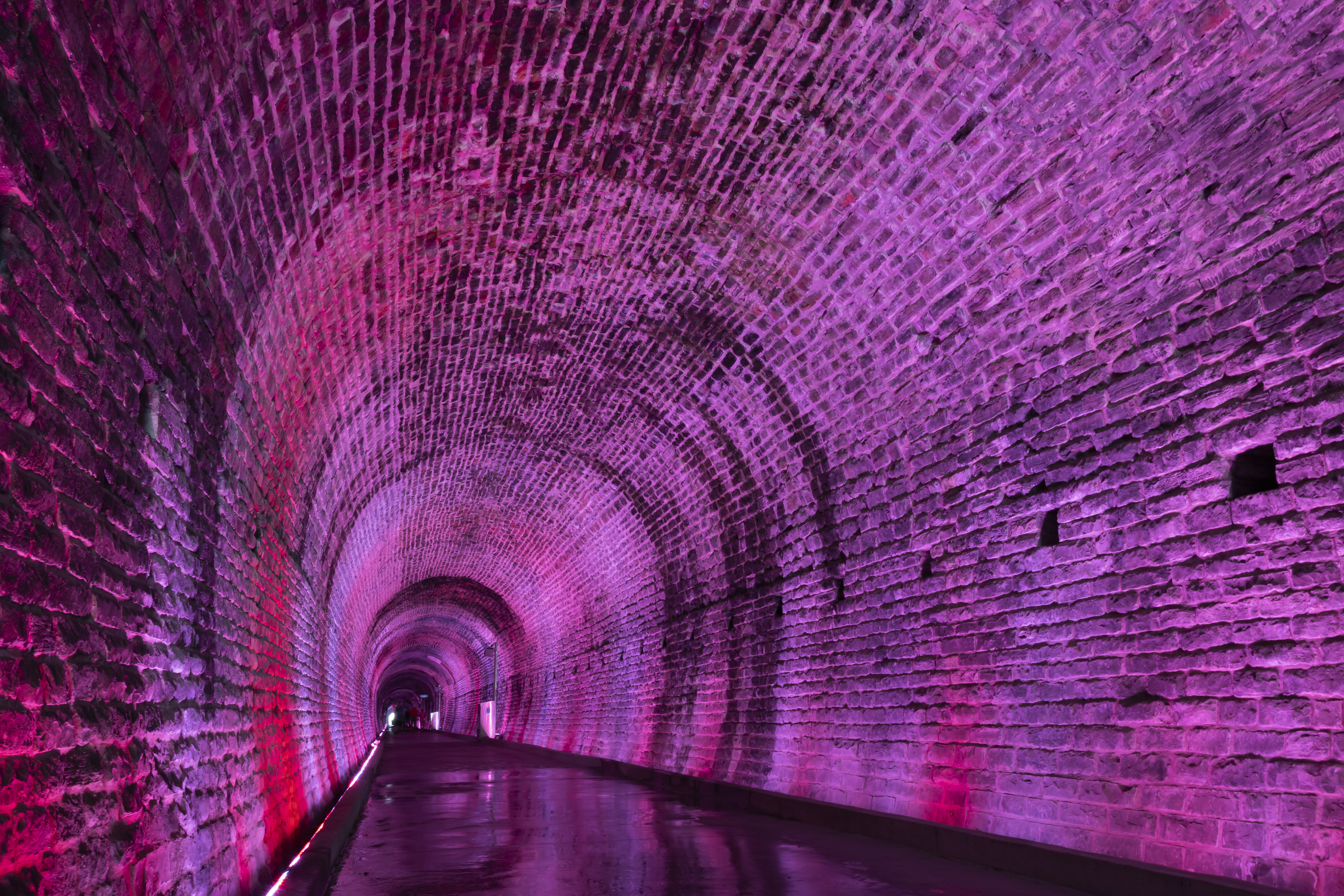

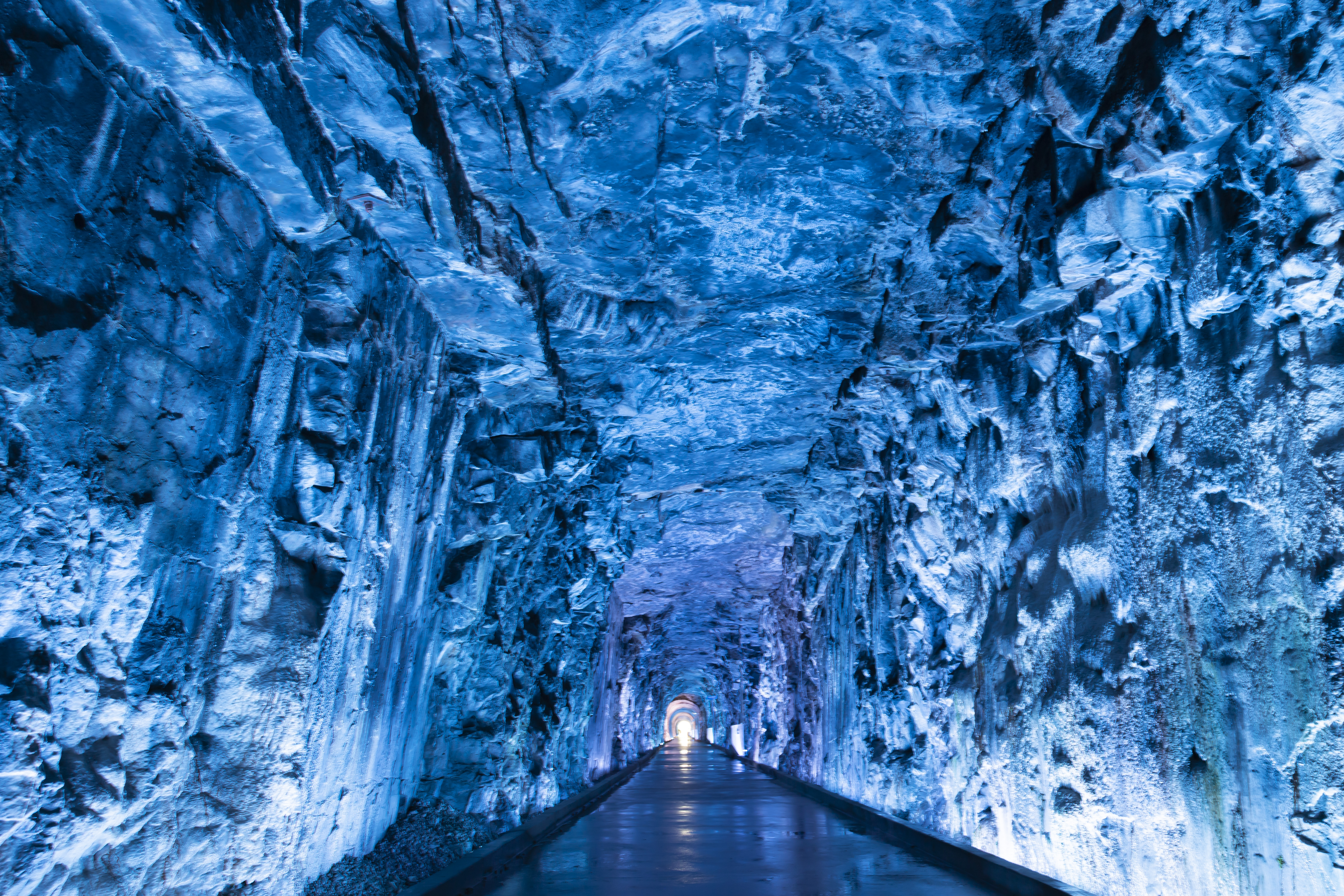

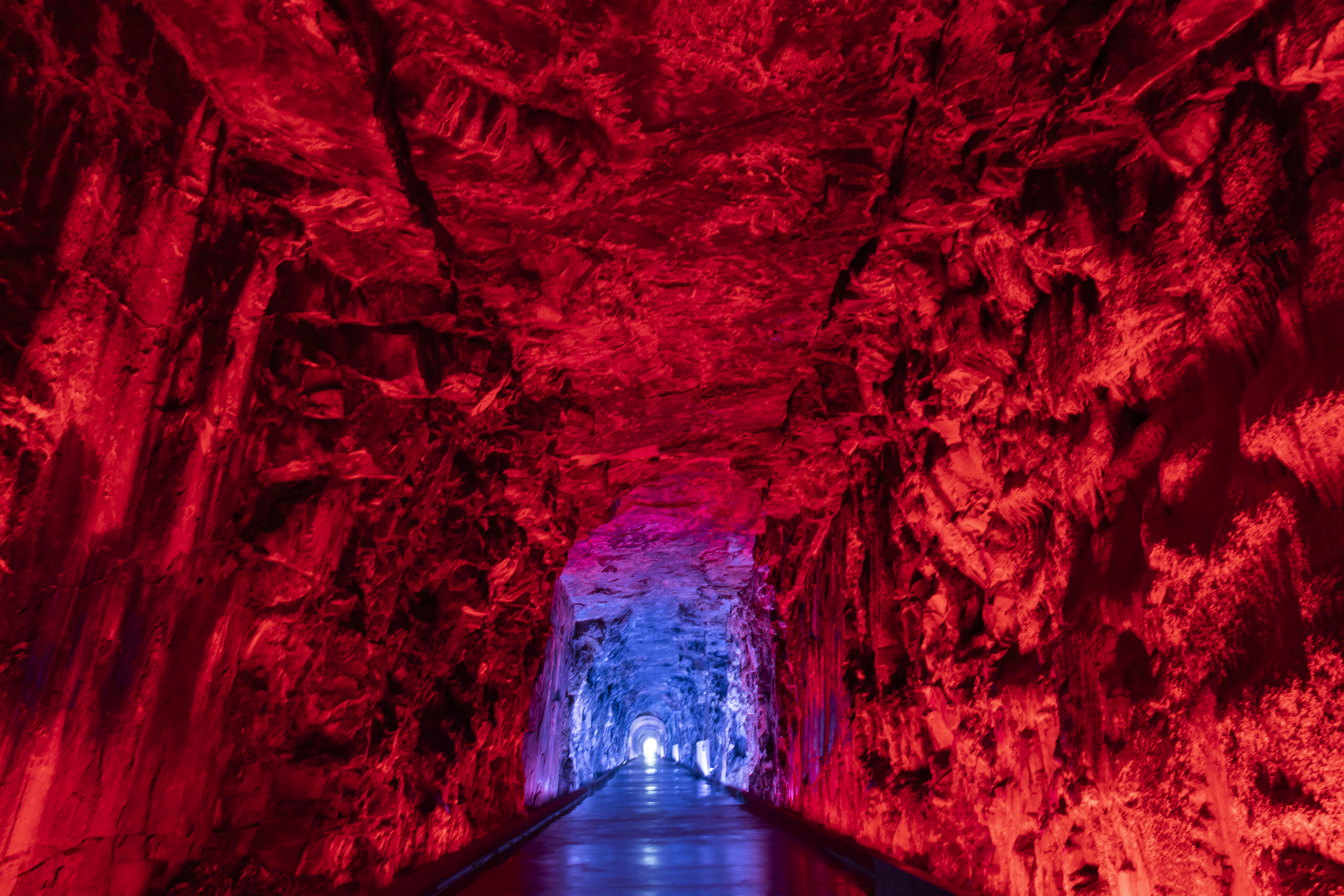

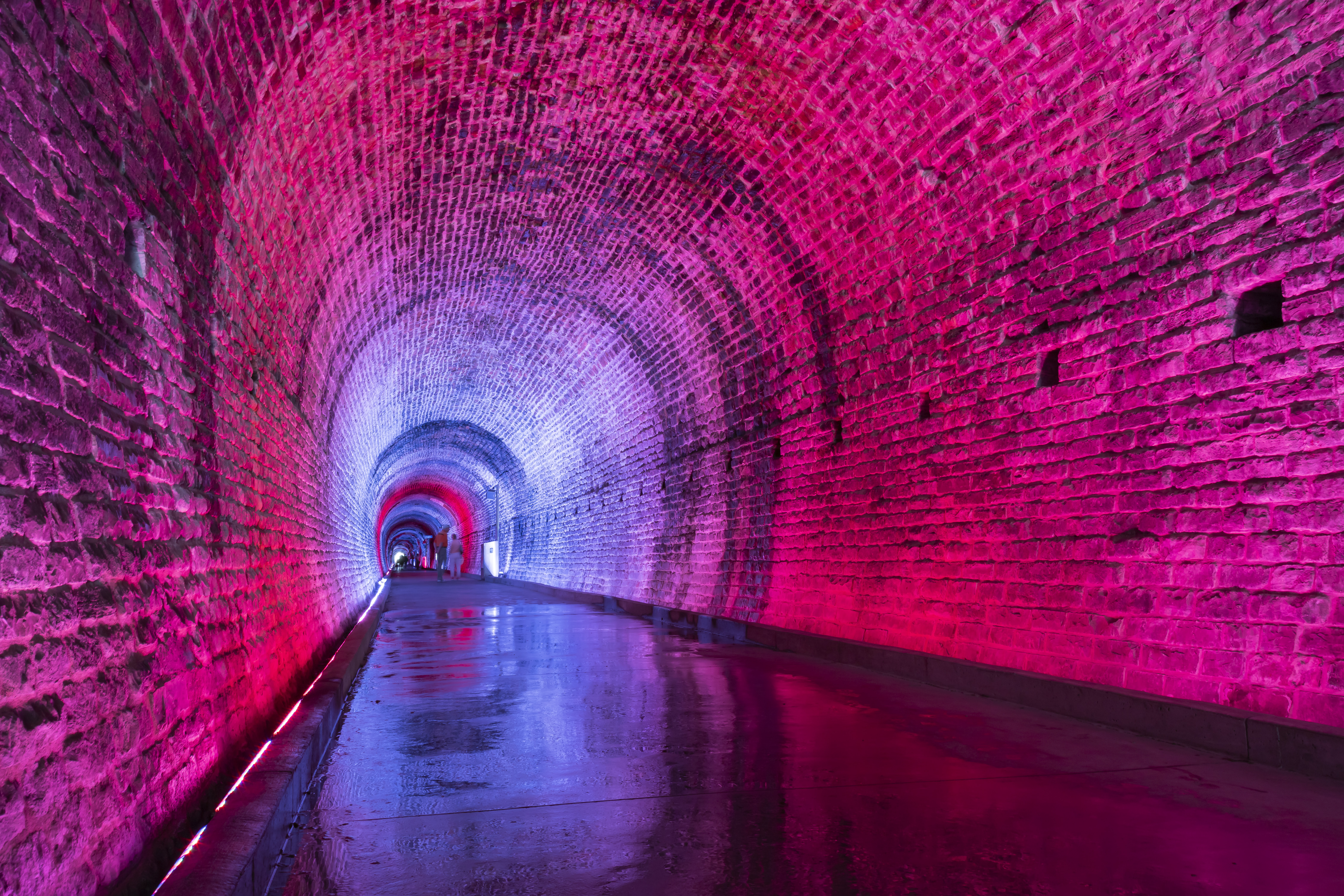
