= Daniel Hilliard =

Canadian politician

Ontario MPP
- In office 1886–1888
- Preceded by: William Clyde Caldwell
- Succeeded by: William Clyde Caldwell
- Constituency: Lanark North

Personal details
- Born: February 10, 1824 Prescott, Canada West
- Died: June 23, 1888 (aged 64) Toronto, Ontario
- Party: Liberal
- Spouse: Jane Dickson
- Occupation: Lumber merchant

Daniel Hilliard (February 10, 1824 – June 23, 1888) was an Ontario merchant and political figure. He represented Lanark North in the Legislative Assembly of Ontario as a Liberal member from 1886 to 1888.

He was born in Prescott and was educated in local schools there and in Toronto. Hilliard was a timber merchant in Pakenham. He married Jane Dickson, the sister of his partner, William Dickson. He supported the prohibition of alcohol. Hilliard died in office in 1888.

The Township of Hilliard, Ontario, was named after him.
