= Brockville =

- City (single-tier)
- City of Brockville
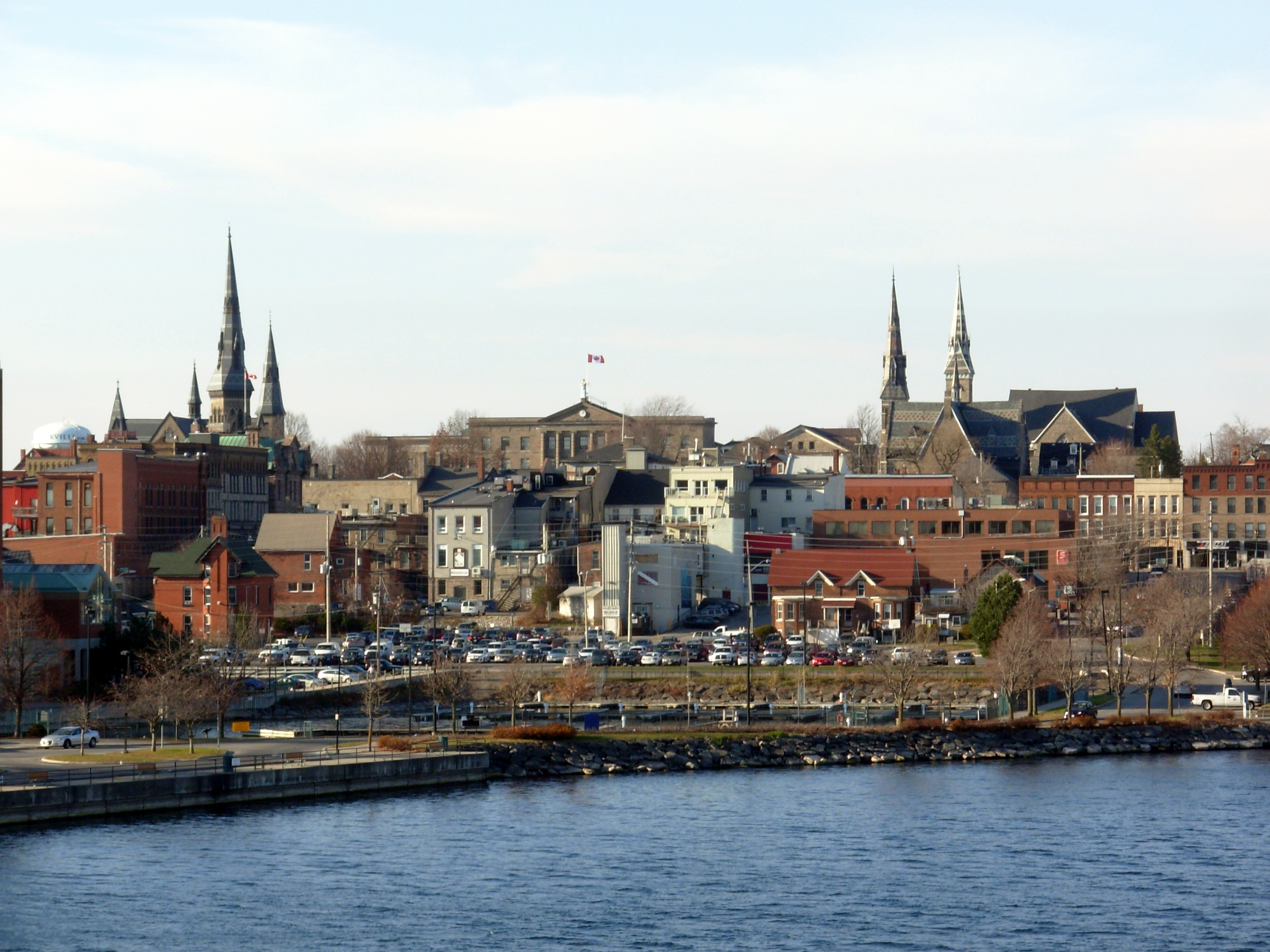
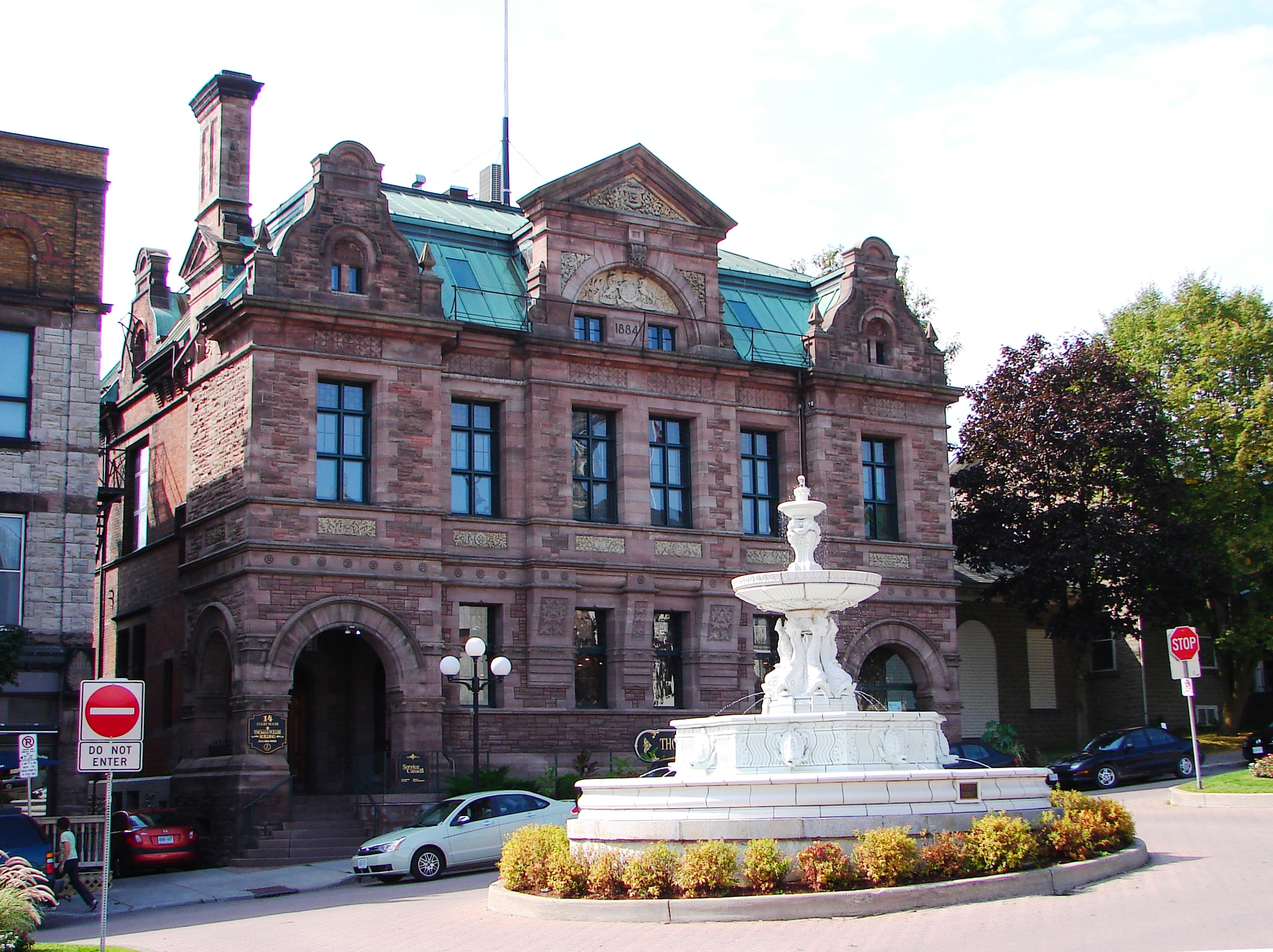
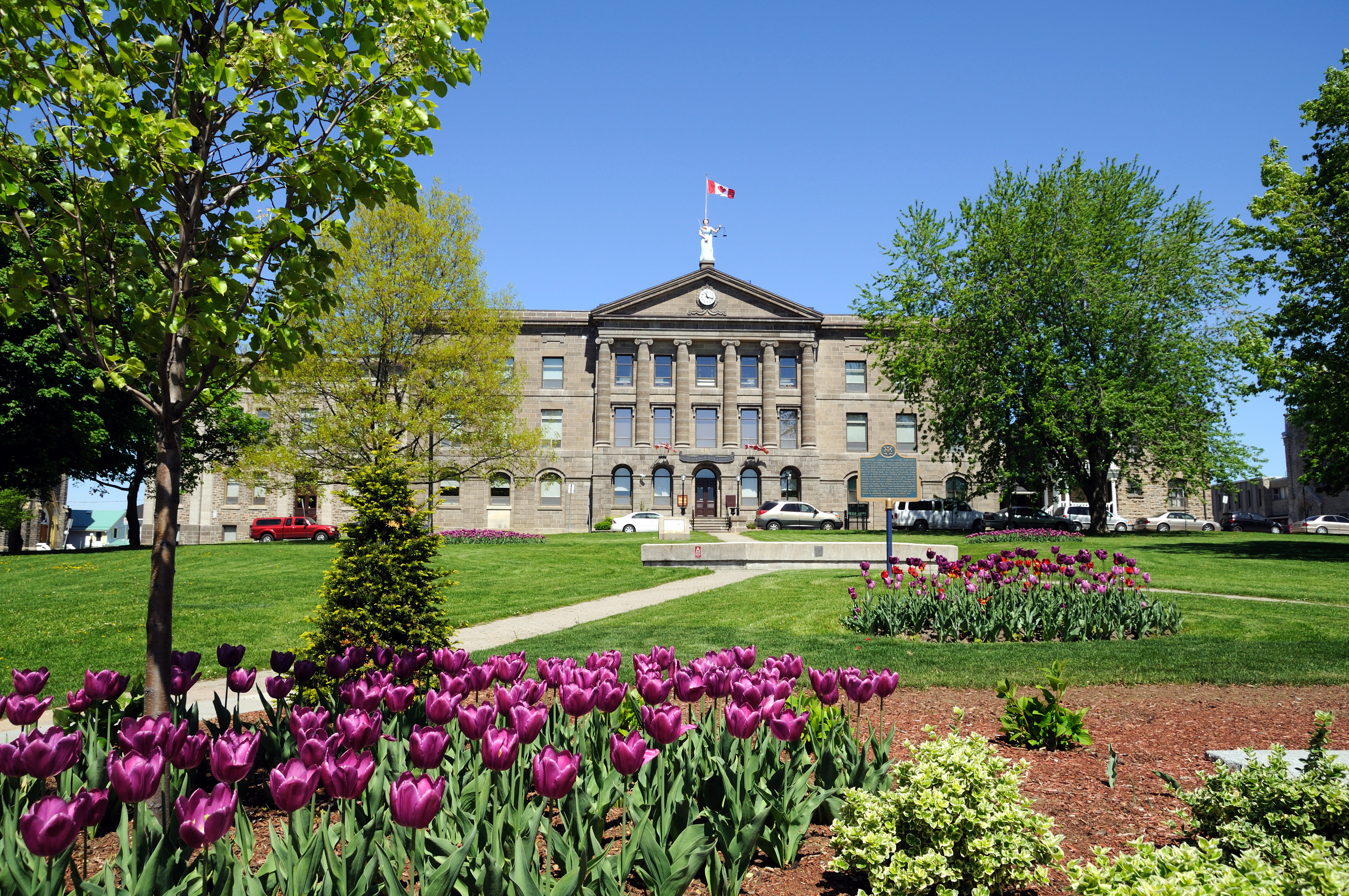
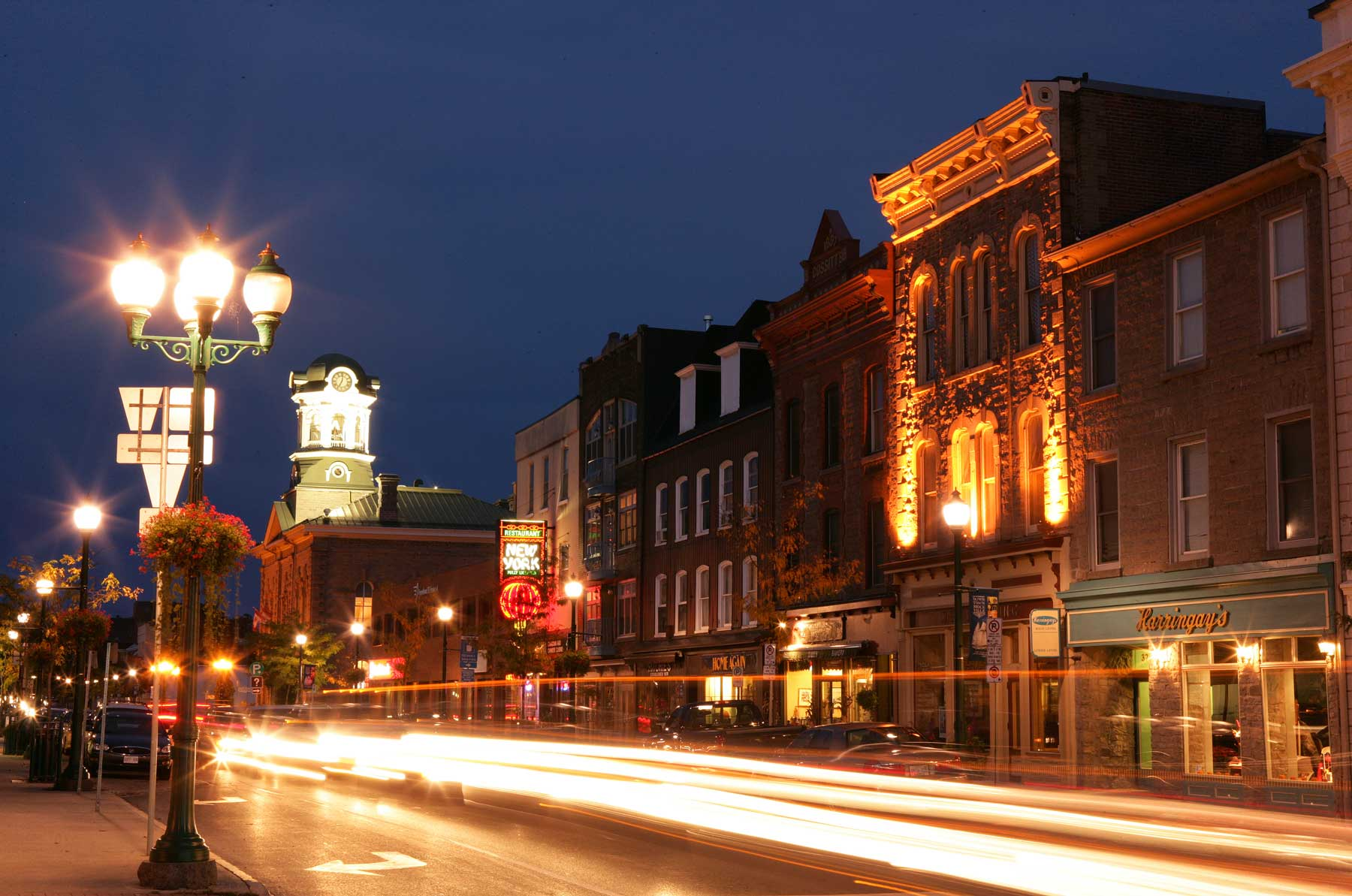
- From left to right: Brockville skyline, Fuller Building with John H. Fulford Memorial Fountain, Leeds and Grenville County Court House, Downtown Brockville

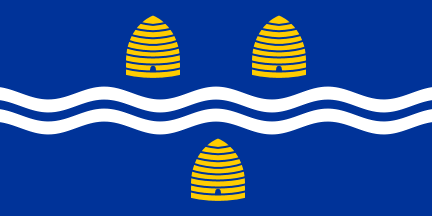
- Flag Coat of arms Heraldic badge
- Nickname: "City of 1000 Islands"
- Motto: Industria, Intelligentia, Prosperitas (Latin) "Industry, Intelligence, Prosperity"
- Location within Southern Ontario Location within United Counties of Leeds and Grenville
- Coordinates: 44°35′N 75°41′W
- Country: Canada
- Province: Ontario
- County: Leeds and Grenville (independent)
- Settled: 1785
- Incorporated: 1832

Government
  - Type: City
  - Mayor: Matt Wren
  - Fed. riding: Leeds—Grenville—Thousand Islands—Rideau Lakes
  - Prov. riding: Leeds—Grenville—Thousand Islands and Rideau Lakes

Area
  - Land: 20.91 km^{2} (8.07 sq mi)
  - Urban: 18.70 km^{2} (7.22 sq mi)
  - Metro: 576.87 km^{2} (222.73 sq mi)

Population (2021)
  - Total: 22,116
  - Density: 1,057.8/km^{2} (2,740/sq mi)
  - Urban: 22,293
  - Urban density: 1,192.3/km^{2} (3,088/sq mi)
  - Metro: 31,661
  - Metro density: 54.9/km^{2} (142/sq mi)
- Time zone: UTC−05:00 (EST)
  - Summer (DST): UTC−04:00 (EDT)
- Postal code FSA: K6T to K6V
- Area codes: 613, 343
- Website: brockville.com

Brockville is a city in Eastern Ontario, Canada, in the Thousand Islands region. Although it falls within the United Counties of Leeds and Grenville, it is politically independent of the county. It is included with Leeds and Grenville for census purposes only.

Known as the "City of the 1000 Islands", Brockville is situated on the land which was previously inhabited by the St. Lawrence Iroquoians and later by the Oswegatchie people. Brockville is one of Ontario's oldest communities, established by Loyalist settlers and is named after the British general Sir Isaac Brock.

Tourist attractions in Brockville include the Brockville Tunnel, Fulford Place, and the Aquatarium.

== History ==
Human inhabitation of the upper St. Lawrence River dates at least to the late Middle Woodland period by the Point Peninsula people. Iron oxide pictographs on rock faces have been documented on the Fulford property in Brockville and at Hillcrest west of Brockville. From around 1450 until sometime in the 1500s, the St. Lawrence Iroquoians established a cluster of palisaded agricultural villages in the vicinity of Brockville and Prescott, the Roebuck site being the best known. By 1751, the Oswegatchie people had occupied the north shore of the St. Lawrence between Toniato Creek (now known as Jones Creek, in Thousand Islands National Park) and the Long Sault. After negotiations with the British, they withdrew from the frontage on the north shore of the St. Lawrence in 1784, resettling at what is now Lisbon, New York.

This area of Ontario was first settled by English speakers in 1784, when thousands of American refugees arrived from the American colonies after the American Revolutionary War. They were later called United Empire Loyalists because of their continued allegiance to King George III. The struggle between Britain and the 13 American colonies occurred in the years 1776 to 1783 and seriously divided loyalties among people in some colonies, such as New York and Vermont. In many areas, traders and merchants, especially in the coastal cities or the northern border regions, had stronger business ties and allegiance to the Crown than did the frontiersmen of the interior. During the six-year war, which ended with the capitulation of the British in 1782, many colonists who remained loyal to the crown were frequently subject to harsh reprisals and unfair dispossession of their property by their fellow citizens. Many Loyalists chose to flee north to the British colony of Quebec. Great Britain opened the western region of Canada (first known as Upper Canada and now Ontario), purchasing land from First Nations to allocate to the predominantly English-speaking Loyalists in compensation for their losses and helping them with some supplies as they founded new settlements. The first years were very harsh as they struggled on the frontier. Some exiles returned to the United States.

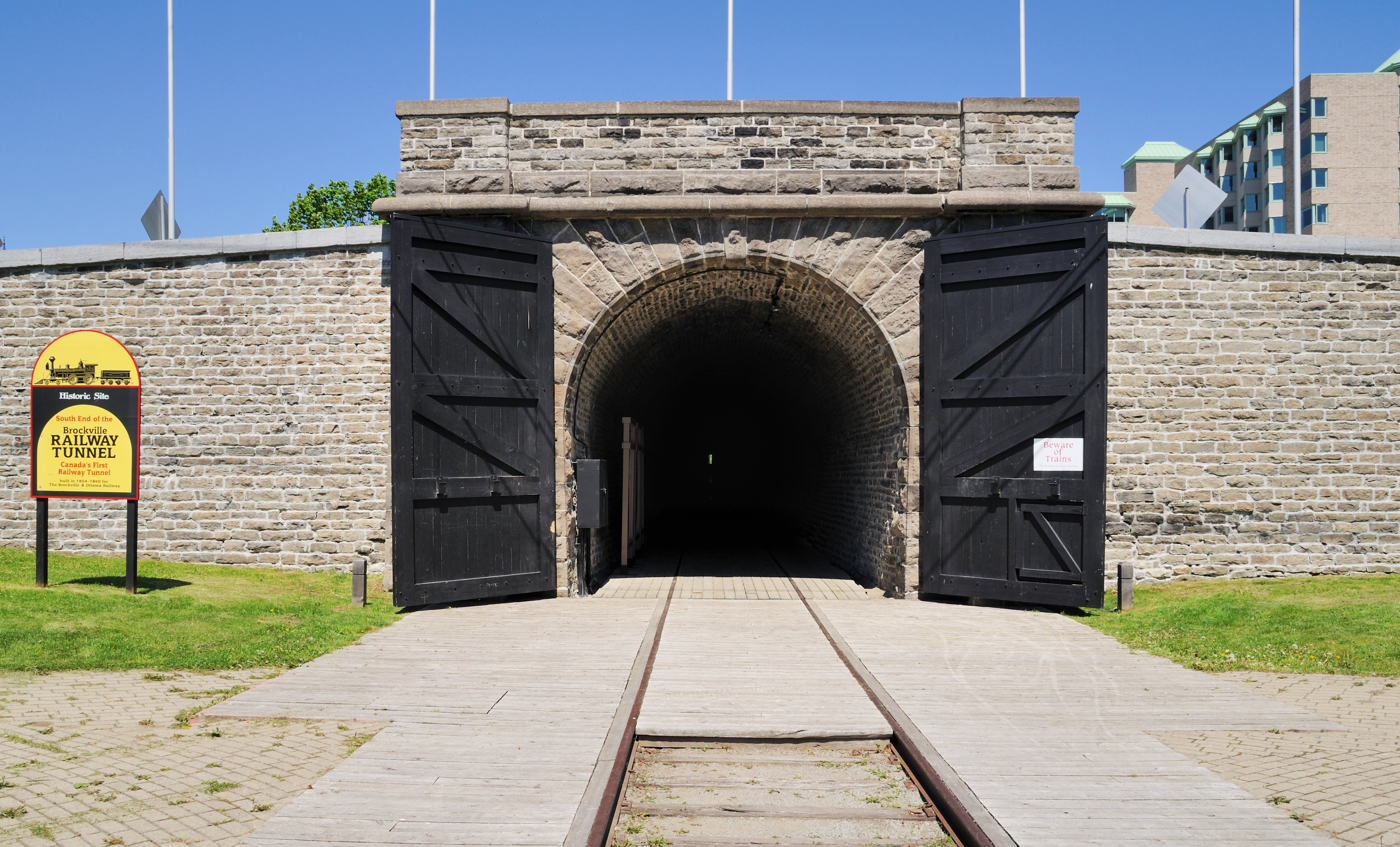
The south portal of the Brockville Tunnel, Canada's first railway tunnel, opened in 1860.

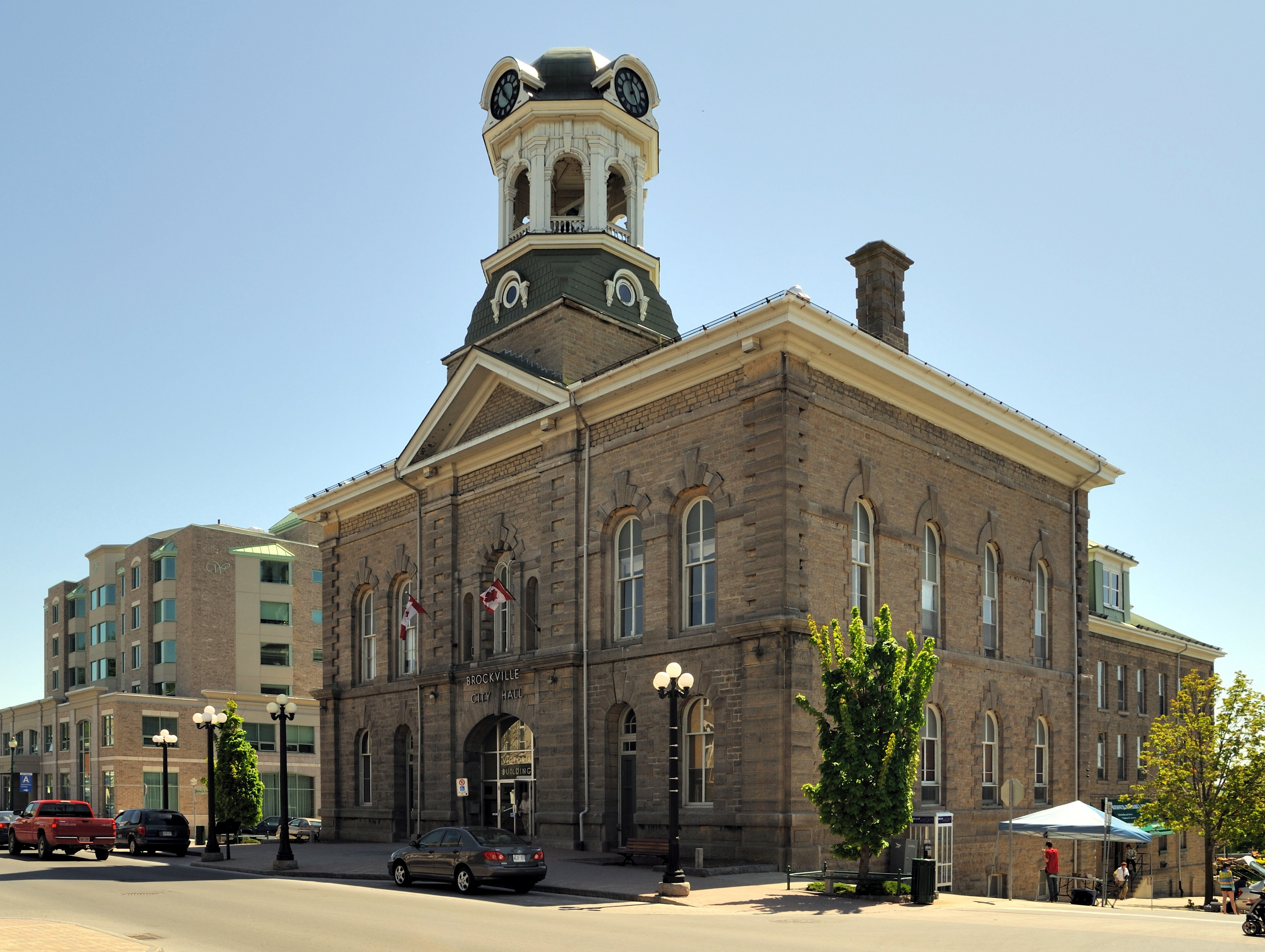
Victoria Hall, now the site of Brockville's City Hall, was built in 1862–64 as a concert hall in front and a butchers' market in the rear.

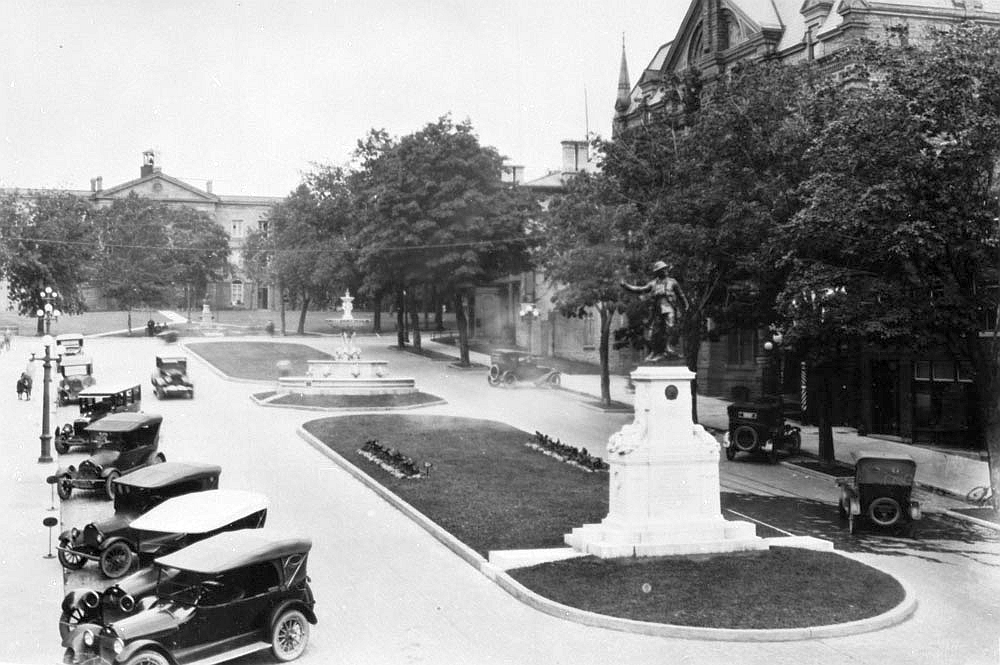
Court House Avenue and the War Memorial, 1925

The Saint Lawrence River got its name from explorer Jacques Cartier's arrival in the gulf on August 10, 1535, the feast day of the martyred Roman Christian, Saint Lawrence. In 1785, the first Loyalist to take up land where Brockville is now located was William Buell Sr. (1751–1832), an ensign disbanded from the King's Rangers from the state of New York. Residents commonly called the first settlement Buell's Bay. Around 1810, government officials of Upper Canada assigned the name Elizabethtown to the developing village.

During mid-1812, the Hon. Charles Jones and other leading residents of the village, then known by the misleading name Elizabethtown, started to refer to the village as Brockville in their correspondence. The commanding British General in Upper Canada and temporary administrator of the province was Major-General Isaac Brock. He was celebrated as the "Hero and Saviour" of Upper Canada because of his recent success in securing the surrender by Americans of Fort Detroit during the first months of the War of 1812. After the surrender of Fort Detroit, General Brock was next involved in other battles on the Niagara Peninsula. On October 13, 1812, he was fatally wounded while leading troops up the heights near the village of Queenston, then temporarily held by American militia. General Brock had learned of the honour being offered by the residents of Elizabethtown, but had no chance to give it his official blessing before his death. It took several years for Provincial officials to officially accept the new name, though most residents used it. A raid on Elizabethtown occurred on the early morning of February 7, 1813, when Benjamin Forsyth and 200 of his American forces crossed the frozen Saint Lawrence River, occupied the settlement, seized military and public stores, freed American prisoners, and captured local militia soldiers and leading citizens.

By 1830, the population of Brockville exceeded 1,000. This entitled it to be represented by its own elected member in the House of Assembly. Henry Jones, the village postmaster, was elected in October 1830 to the 11th Parliament of the Province.

Brockville became Ontario's first incorporated self-governing town on January 28, 1832, two years before the town of Toronto. After the passing of the Brockville Police Act, passed by the Legislative Assembly of Upper Canada, Brockville was granted the power to govern its own affairs, pass laws, and raise taxes. The first elections for the new Board of Police were held on April 2, 1832, when four male citizens were elected to the Police Board. These four, in turn, chose a fifth member, Daniel Jones, who became the first Police Board President (or Mayor) of Brockville. In March 1836, he became the first native Upper Canadian to receive a knighthood for services to the Crown.

By 1846, the population was 2,111. This growth was accompanied by the construction of many buildings made of stone and brick. There was a County courthouse and Jail, six churches or chapels, and a steamboat pier for travel to and from Montreal and Kingston. Two newspapers were published, two bank agencies were established, and the post office received mail daily. Several court and government departments had offices here. The first industries consisted of one grist mill, four tanneries, two asheries and four wagon makers, in addition to tradespeople of various types.

Later in the 19th century, the town developed as a local centre of industry, including shipbuilding, saddleries, tanneries, tinsmiths, a foundry, a brewery, and several hotels. By 1854, a patent medicine industry had sprung up in Brockville and Morristown, New York, across the Saint Lawrence River, featuring such products as Dr Morse's Indian Root Pills, Dr. McKenzie's Worm Tablets, and later, Dr. Williams' Pink Pills for Pale People.

In 1855, Brockville was chosen as a divisional point of the new Grand Trunk Railway between Montreal and Toronto. This contributed to its growth, as it could offer jobs in railway maintenance and related fields. At the same time, the north–south line of the Brockville and Ottawa Railway was built to join the timber trade of the Ottawa Valley with the Saint Lawrence River ship route. A well-engineered tunnel for this railway was dug and blasted underneath the middle of Brockville. Completed in December 1860, the Brockville Tunnel was the first railway tunnel built in Canada.

Brockville and many other towns in Canada West were targets of the threatened Fenian invasion after the American Civil War ended in 1865. In June 1866, the Irish-American Brotherhood of Fenians invaded Canada. They launched raids across the Niagara River into Canada West (Ontario) and from Vermont into Canada East (Quebec). Canadian Prime Minister John A. Macdonald called upon the volunteer militia companies in every town to protect Canada. The Brockville Infantry Company and the Brockville Rifle Company (now The Brockville Rifles) were mobilized. The unsuccessful Fenian Raids were a catalyst that contributed to the creation of the new confederated Canada in 1867.

By 1869, Brockville had a population of 5000 and a passenger station on the Grand Trunk Railway. It was the County Town of the United Counties of Leeds and Grenville and a Port of Entry. Steamboats stopped in Brockville daily while plying among Montreal, Kingston, Toronto and Hamilton. The Brockville and Ottawa Railway connected Brockville with Smith's Falls, Perth, Almonte, Carleton Place and Sand Point. During the summer, a steam ferry plied every half-hour between Brockville and Morristown, New York.

In 1962, Brockville was granted official status as a city. Its coat of arms featured a beehive surrounded by a golden chain and bears the motto Industria, Intelligentia, Prosperitas. This is an official heraldic design. Brockville is one of the few Canadian cities to have a recognized heraldic flag.

== Geography ==
Brockville is located on the north shore of the Saint Lawrence River, about halfway between Kingston to the west and Cornwall to the east. It is 115 km (71 mi) south of the national capital Ottawa. Brockville faces the village of Morristown, New York, on the south side of the river.

=== Climate ===
Brockville experiences a humid continental climate (Dfb). The highest temperature ever recorded in Brockville was 39.4 °C (102.9 °F) on July 31, 1917, and June 4, 1919. The coldest temperature ever recorded was −38.3 °C (−36.9 °F) on February 4, 1886, and January 28, 1925.

Climate data for Brockville (1991−2020 normals, extremes 1871−present)
Month	Jan	Feb	Mar	Apr	May	Jun	Jul	Aug	Sep	Oct	Nov	Dec	Year
Record high °C (°F)	16.7 (62.1)	15.5 (59.9)	26.1 (79.0)	30.6 (87.1)	32.2 (90.0)	39.4 (102.9)	39.4 (102.9)	36.7 (98.1)	34.4 (93.9)	27.8 (82.0)	23.9 (75.0)	19.5 (67.1)	39.4 (102.9)
Mean daily maximum °C (°F)	−3.1 (26.4)	−1.7 (28.9)	3.7 (38.7)	11.3 (52.3)	18.8 (65.8)	23.4 (74.1)	26.1 (79.0)	25.4 (77.7)	21.2 (70.2)	13.8 (56.8)	7.0 (44.6)	0.4 (32.7)	12.2 (54.0)
Daily mean °C (°F)	−7.2 (19.0)	−6 (21)	−0.7 (30.7)	6.6 (43.9)	13.5 (56.3)	18.5 (65.3)	21.3 (70.3)	20.6 (69.1)	16.5 (61.7)	9.7 (49.5)	3.5 (38.3)	−3.0 (26.6)	7.8 (46.0)
Mean daily minimum °C (°F)	−11.3 (11.7)	−10.3 (13.5)	−5 (23)	1.8 (35.2)	8.3 (46.9)	13.5 (56.3)	16.5 (61.7)	15.7 (60.3)	11.7 (53.1)	5.8 (42.4)	−0.2 (31.6)	−6.5 (20.3)	3.3 (37.9)
Record low °C (°F)	−38.3 (−36.9)	−38.3 (−36.9)	−31.7 (−25.1)	−15 (5)	−6.7 (19.9)	0.0 (32.0)	2.8 (37.0)	1.7 (35.1)	−3.9 (25.0)	−11.1 (12.0)	−26.1 (−15.0)	−36.1 (−33.0)	−38.3 (−36.9)
Average precipitation mm (inches)	83.8 (3.30)	64.0 (2.52)	68.3 (2.69)	89.1 (3.51)	79.6 (3.13)	95.7 (3.77)	99.2 (3.91)	81.9 (3.22)	95.5 (3.76)	94.0 (3.70)	81.0 (3.19)	85.2 (3.35)	1,017.1 (40.04)
Average rainfall mm (inches)	34.3 (1.35)	22.6 (0.89)	39.7 (1.56)	81.4 (3.20)	79.4 (3.13)	95.7 (3.77)	99.2 (3.91)	81.9 (3.22)	95.5 (3.76)	92.6 (3.65)	69.8 (2.75)	44.7 (1.76)	836.7 (32.94)
Average snowfall cm (inches)	49.5 (19.5)	41.4 (16.3)	28.6 (11.3)	7.7 (3.0)	0.2 (0.1)	0.0 (0.0)	0.0 (0.0)	0.0 (0.0)	0.0 (0.0)	1.4 (0.6)	11.2 (4.4)	40.6 (16.0)	180.4 (71.0)
Average precipitation days (≥ 0.2 mm)	15.7	12.0	11.6	12.6	12.6	12.0	12.2	10.9	11.4	13.2	12.8	14.9	151.9
Average rainy days (≥ 0.2 mm)	5.0	3.7	6.8	11.6	12.6	12.0	12.2	10.9	11.4	13.1	10.4	7.4	117.0
Average snowy days (≥ 0.2 cm)	12.0	9.2	6.1	2.0	0.11	0.0	0.0	0.0	0.0	0.32	3.2	9.1	42.0
Source: Environment Canada

== Demographics ==
In the 2021 Census of Population conducted by Statistics Canada, Brockville had a population of 22,116 living in 10,647 of its 11,088 total private dwellings, a change of 2.5% from its 2016 population of 21,569. With a land area of 20.91 km^{2} (8.07 sq mi), it had a population density of 1,057.7/km^{2} (2,739.4/sq mi) in 2021.

Canada census – Brockville community profile

	2021	2016	2011
Population	22,116 (+2.5% from 2016)	21,854 (-0.1% from 2011)	21,870 (-0.4% from 2006)
Land area	20.91 km^{2} (8.07 sq mi)	18.71 km^{2} (7.22 sq mi)	20.90 km^{2} (8.07 sq mi)
Population density	1,057.8/km^{2} (2,740/sq mi)	1,167.8/km^{2} (3,025/sq mi)	1,046.2/km^{2} (2,710/sq mi)
Median age	51.6 (M: 49.2, F: 54.4)	50.3 (M: 47.8, F: 52.3)
Private dwellings	11,088 (total) 10,647 (occupied)	10,893 (total)	10,645 (total)
Median household income	$63,600	$51,219

References: 2021 2016 2011

Historical census populations – Brockville

Year	Pop.	±%
1871	5,102	—
1881	7,609	+49.1%
1891	8,791	+15.5%
1901	8,940	+1.7%
1911	9,374	+4.9%
1921	10,043	+7.1%
1931	9,736	−3.1%

Year	Pop.	±%
1941	11,342	+16.5%
1951	12,301	+8.5%
1961	17,744	+44.2%
1971	19,765	+11.4%
1976	19,903	+0.7%
1981	19,896	−0.0%
1986	20,880	+4.9%

Year	Pop.	±%
1991	21,582	+3.4%
1996	21,752	+0.8%
2001	21,375	−1.7%
2006	21,957	+2.7%
2011	21,870	−0.4%
2016	21,569	−1.4%
2021	22,116	+2.5%

2016 Population figure based on revised count.
Source: Statistics Canada

Visible minority and Aboriginal population (Canada 2021 Census)
Population group		Population	% of total population
White		20,265	94%
Visible minority group	South Asian	440	2%
Visible minority group	Chinese	165	0.8%
Visible minority group	Black	170	0.8%
Visible minority group	Filipino	145	0.7%
Visible minority group	Arab	175	0.8%
Visible minority group	Latin American	95	0.4%
Visible minority group	Southeast Asian	35	0.2%
Visible minority group	West Asian	35	0.2%
Visible minority group	Japanese	35	0.2%
Visible minority group	Korean	20	0.1%
Visible minority group	Visible minority, n.i.e.	30	0.1%
Visible minority group	Multiple visible minority	55	0.3%
Total visible minority population		1,395	6.5%
Aboriginal group	First Nations	165	0.8%
Aboriginal group	Métis	45	0.2%
Aboriginal group	Inuit	0	0%
Aboriginal group	Multiple Aboriginal identity	30	0.1%
Total Aboriginal population		205	1%
Total population		21,515	100%

Visible minority and Aboriginal population (Canada 2006 Census)
Population group		Population	% of total population
White		20,670	95%
Visible minority group	South Asian	70	0.3%
Visible minority group	Chinese	150	0.7%
Visible minority group	Black	55	0.3%
Visible minority group	Filipino	95	0.4%
Visible minority group	Latin American	50	0.2%
Visible minority group	Arab	0	0%
Visible minority group	Southeast Asian	125	0.6%
Visible minority group	West Asian	20	0.1%
Visible minority group	Korean	15	0.1%
Visible minority group	Japanese	10	0%
Visible minority group	Visible minority, n.i.e.	45	0.2%
Visible minority group	Multiple visible minority	50	0.2%
Total visible minority population		685	3.1%
Aboriginal group	First Nations	230	1.1%
Aboriginal group	Métis	150	0.7%
Aboriginal group	Inuit	0	0%
Aboriginal group	Aboriginal, n.i.e.	20	0.1%
Aboriginal group	Multiple Aboriginal identity	10	0%
Total Aboriginal population		410	1.9%
Total population		21,765	100%

== Economy ==
Brockville is home to several large industrial manufacturers. 3M operates four factories in Brockville, manufacturing tape and occupational health and safety products. Procter & Gamble manufactured dryer sheets and cleaning products from the brands their brands Bounce and Swiffer respectively, employing 600 people. However, operations began to slow down in 2017 until the closure of the plant in 2020 and all operations of the plant being moved to locations in West Virginia. In January 2022, the Canadian food company Leclerc, a brand known for making dessert products, announced it would be moving into the vacant P&G plant.

Other industries include manufacturer Canarm, pharmaceutical manufacturer Trillium Canada, and the oil-blending plant of Shell Canada. Canadian retailer Giant Tiger has also opened a distribution centre for frozen food in Brockville. Brockville is also the primary administrative, health care, and commercial centre for Leeds—Grenville county. The Upper Canada District School Board is headquartered in Brockville. The Brockville General Hospital has completed a major expansion project. The Brockville Mental Health Centre is located east of Brockville.

== Tourism ==
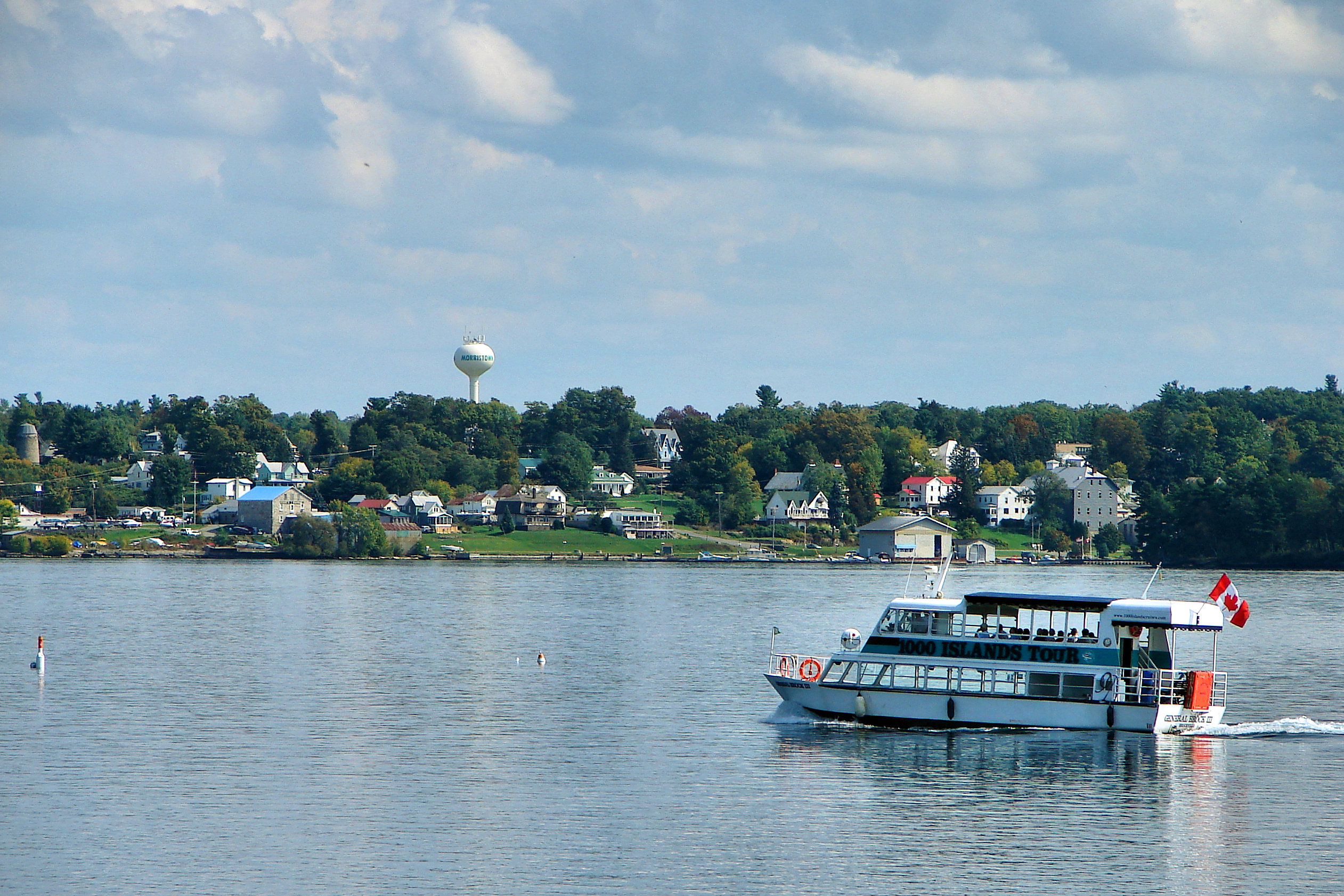
Tour boat on the Saint Lawrence River with Morristown visible on the opposite shore.

Brockville, known as The City of the Thousand Islands, is located on the shore of the Saint Lawrence River. The city revitalized its downtown area, enhancing a waterfront open to the public with parks, walking trails, and numerous shopping locations. The city is an outdoor architecture museum with hundreds of exemplary buildings from all historical periods on its streets.

The Aquatarium at Tall Ships Landing operates the Tourism Office or Visitor Information Centre at 6 Broad Street, along with a small outlet on Blockhouse Island during the Summer season. Both are close to the south end of the Brockville Tunnel, Canada's first railway tunnel. Closed in 1970, it was acquired by Brockville in 1982, and the tunnel reopened in August 2017 as an LED illuminated pedestrian tunnel with music.

The Aquatarium is an interactive discovery centre about the ecology and history of the 1000 Islands region, opened in March 2016. It is located at the bottom of Broad Street next to the Tall Ships Landing, a condominium project. Both overlook the Saint Lawrence River.

The classically designed Brockville Court House, built in 1842–43 and set in its surrounding central Court House Square, stands as the most impressive of all of Brockville's 19th-century architectural structures. It was designed by Toronto architect John G. Howard, who is known to have designed three buildings in Brockville.

The Fulford Place house museum was built in 1899–1901 for Senator George Taylor Fulford at 287 King Street East in Brockville's east end. His palatial home was built on his successful marketing of patent medicines, including Dr. Williams' Pink Pills for Pale People around the world. He was one of the area's wealthiest industrialists before his death in 1905. The house owned and operated by the Ontario Heritage Trust is open for public tours on a seasonal schedule.

The Brockville Museum, situated in the historic downtown core at 5 Henry Street, features exhibits and artifacts related to Brockville's rich history and the city's development as a waterfront community.

The John H. Fulford Memorial Fountain was erected in 1917.

The "1000 Islands & Seaway Cruises" company offers scenic cruises on the Saint Lawrence River departing from Brockville.

The Brockville area is the launching point for underwater wreck diving on sunken ships discovered in the Saint Lawrence, and several dive operators take divers to these sites. In 2014, Brockville collaborated with S.O.S. (Save Ontario Shipwrecks) to launch an underwater Sculpture Park off of Centeen Park. New sculptures are added annually. (Since the early 1990s, underwater visibility has increased due to the effects of the invasive species zebra mussels.)

Brockville was named one of Canada's safest communities by the World Health Organization.

=== Brockville boating ===
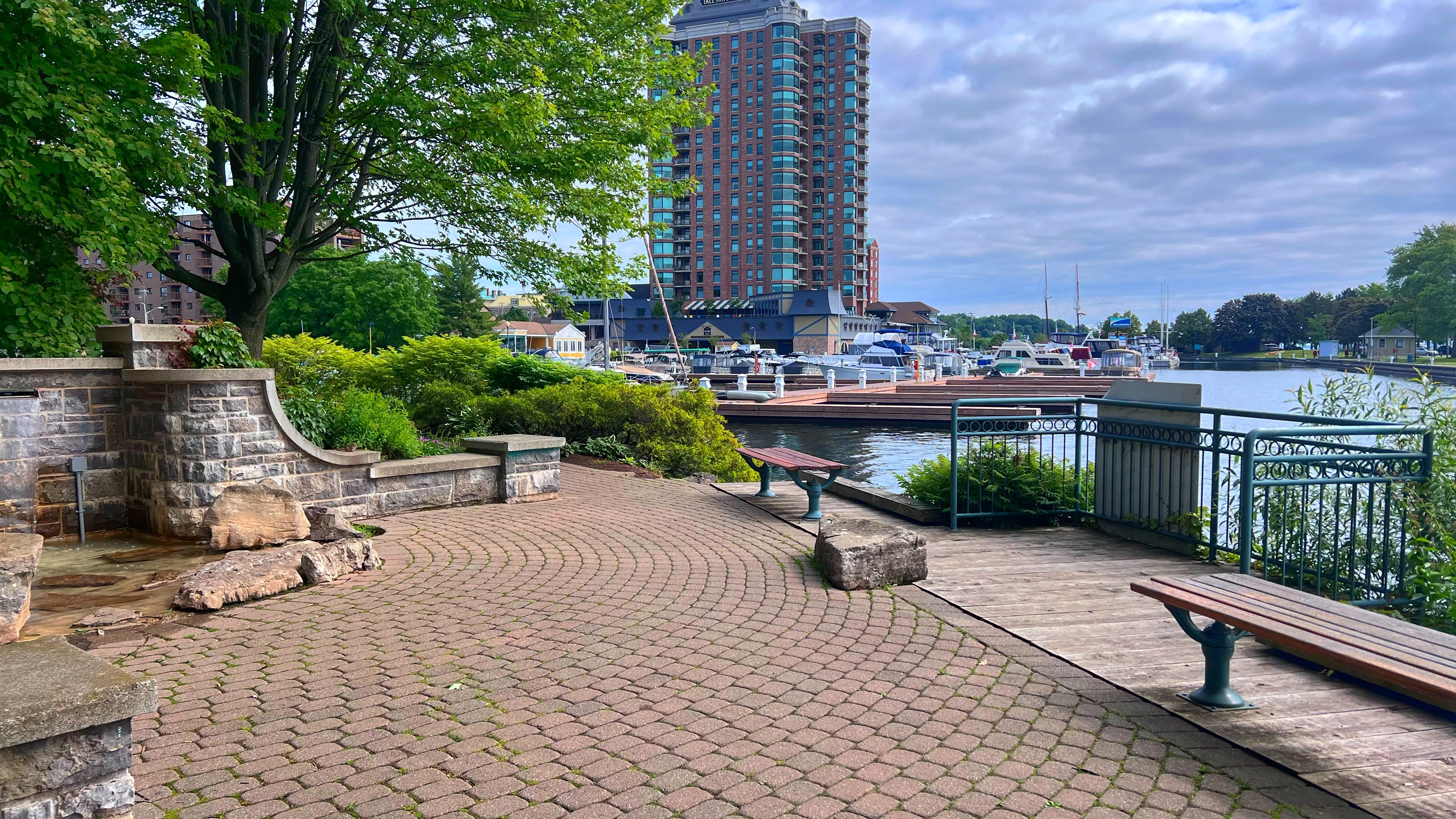
Brockville waterfront. Municipal harbour at Blockhouse Island

Brockville's boating resources include a Municipal Harbour and public marina, a Yacht Club, and several commercial marinas. Upstream is the Brockville-owned Islands group, which contains some city island parks, as well as an island park belonging to the Thousand Islands National Park system.

Brockville is at the downstream end of the Thousand Islands region, which extends to Kingston, Ontario (at the mouth of the Saint Lawrence River at Lake Ontario), 80 km (50 mi) away.

The next nearest commercial boating facilities are located downstream at Prescott, Ontario and upstream at Rockport, Ontario, each roughly half a day's boat trip away at displacement speeds.

== Culture ==
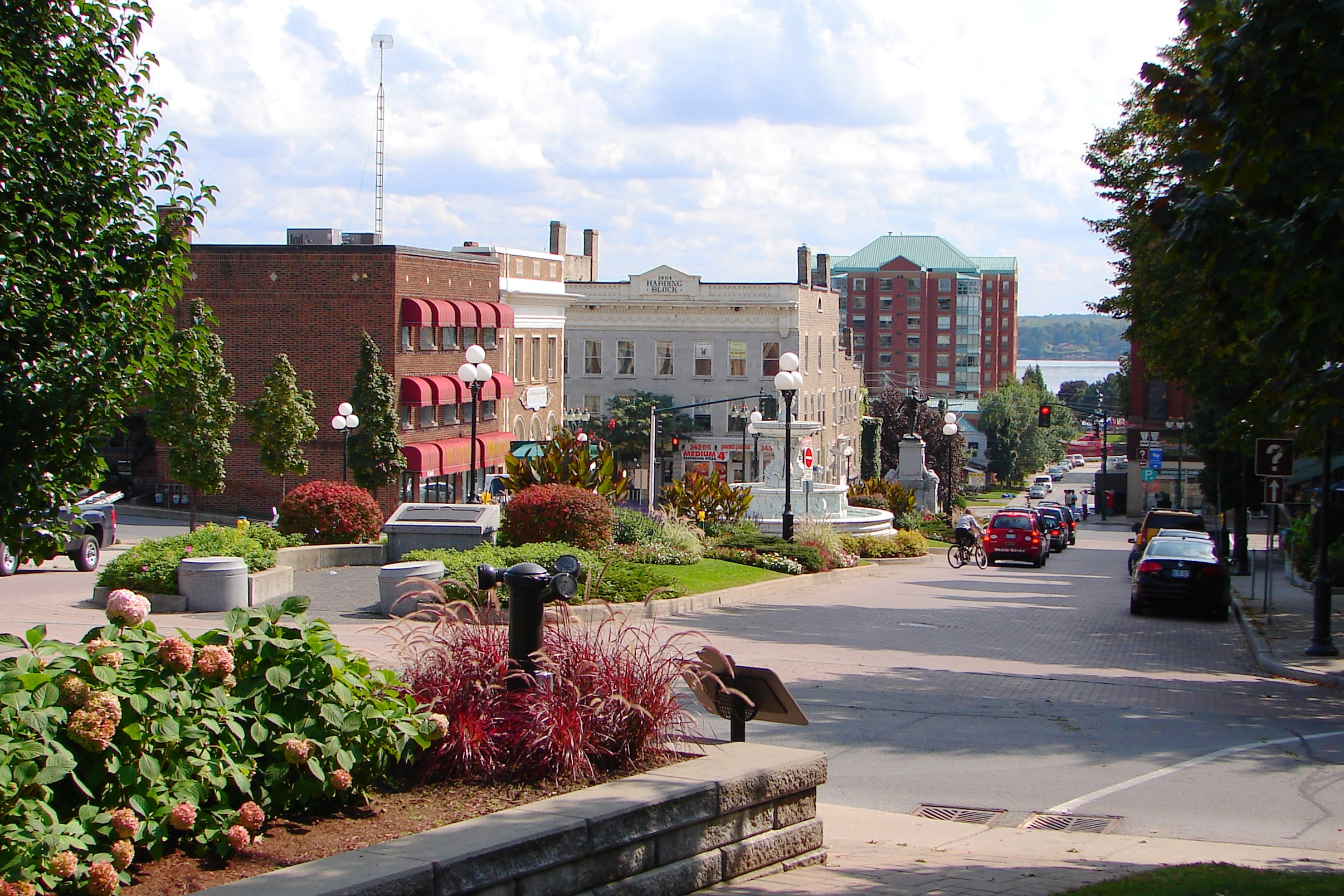
Looking south on Court House Avenue

The city has several music, art and dance organizations, such as the Brockville Artists Studio Association, the Brockville Community Choir, the Brockville Concert Association, the Brockville Musicians' Association, the Brockville Operatic Society, the Brockville Theatre Guild, the Uppity Improv Society the City of Brockville Pipes & Drums, and the Thousand Islanders Chorus.

The Brockville Concert Band arises from a long tradition of community and military bands in Brockville. Civic bands provided entertainment at public venues such as community picnics and outdoor skating rinks. The Brockville Rifles Reserve Band entertained "on the green" in the 1930s and 40s.

Military band members returning from the Second World War formed the Brockville Civic Band. Re-organized as the Brockville Concert Band in 1974, it inherited a musical tradition (and sheet music) from civic and military bands dating back to the turn of the 20th century. The Brockville Concert Band used to play a series of summer concerts every second Tuesday in Hardy Park in Brockville within view of the Saint Lawrence River. The band also plays for various civic functions and entertains at charitable fundraising events. The band's musical director and conductor are now co-conducted by Judy Quick and Christopher Coyea.

St. Lawrence College in Brockville is home to the Music Theatre - Performance Program, which trains students to enter the professional world of musical theatre. SLC Stage produces three professional-quality musicals each season at the Brockville Arts Centre. The Brockville Arts Centre is a 700-seat theatre venue with a full season of entertainment offerings.

Several festivals occur each year.

== Sports ==
=== Basketball ===
The Brockville youth basketball teams, the Brockville Blues and the Brockville Blazers provide basketball coaching and training for boys and girls across the area. The Blues and Blazers have repeatedly placed in the Ontario Basketball Association (OBA) championships. A female basketball player, Stacey Dales (a graduate of Thousand Islands Secondary School), has gone on to play for the University of Oklahoma Sooners, coming in a close second for the NCAA title in her graduating year. She also has the highest Canadian woman's draft pick for the WNBA, where she has played for the Washington Mystics and Chicago Sky. She has worked for ESPN and the NFL Network.

=== Rowing ===
Several local clubs, organizations, and high schools have achieved success at provincial, national, and international levels, such as the Brockville Rowing Club.

=== Track and field ===
Thousand Islands Secondary School is home to a strong high school track & field and cross-country running program. The Pirates have captured numerous Canadian championships and have won 5 straight overall provincial (OFSAA) Ontario championships in track & field and cross country running in an association of over 1000 schools since 2004. With over 15 former students on NCAA athletic track & field scholarships in the United States, TISS has been awarded over $1,000,000 in student athletic scholarships. The TISS team travels all over North America including Ohio, Florida, New Hampshire, and British Columbia, consistently winning major international championships. The school's accomplishments have inspired the community to construct a $1.5 million athletic centre at the school.

=== Ice hockey ===
The city hosts the Brockville Braves, a Tier I Junior "A" ice hockey team. They are a part of the Central Canada Hockey League (CCHL). The Braves were founded in 1963. In 1978, the team was left homeless due to its arena collapsing and were forced to play their home games in other locales, such as Cardinal and Rockland, Ontario. The Brockville Braves won their first championship in 1986. The Brockville Braves play at the Brockville Memorial Centre, which operates its ice surface from September to April.

In November 2017, the grounds at Rotary Park were excavated to build a new skating rink, complete with a bathroom and change rooms, which was named the P&G Pavilion on January 9, 2020. Furthermore, there are additional ice surfaces for minor hockey use at the Centennial Youth Arena.

=== Baseball ===
Brockville Bunnies Youth Baseball Program is an elite-level program that operates out of this small city, with provincial championships and several pro and Olympic graduates. Brockville was home to a minor league baseball team that competed in the Canadian–American League in 1936 and 1937, known as the Brockville Pirates for one season and then as the Brockville Blues.

=== Golf ===
Several golf courses in the Brockville area cater to various skill levels. Sunnidel Golf is perfect for an easy-going round, featuring a par three course. In contrast, the Brockville Country Club poses a more significant challenge to the average golfer. The membership comprises an older demographic and is semi-private. The course is open to green fees; however, certain playing restrictions are imposed.

=== Automobile racing ===
The Brockville Ontario Speedway (The BOS) is a clay oval track just north of the city on Highway 29 in Forthton. The track races every Saturday night from May to September. Classes that race every week include Rookies, Street Stock, Sportsman, Modified, and Vintage.

=== Rugby ===
The Brockville Privateers R.F.C. was formed in 1993, reestablishing a local rugby club in the area. Rugby has been played in the Brockville area as far back as 1899. The original Brockville Rugby Football Club eventually became part of the Brockville Collegiate Institute (BCI). Brockville Rugby now includes multiple men's and women's teams and a solid junior-age grade program.

=== Swimming ===
The Upper Canada Swim Club (The River Otters) runs competitive teams for children and young adults. The YMCA Brockville runs competitive teams for children and young adults.

== Transportation ==
Brockville is midway between Toronto and Montreal (340 km, 210 mi northeast of Toronto and 210 km, 130 mi southwest of Montreal), and just over one hour from Ottawa. Highway 401 runs through Brockville, with exits at Leeds & Grenville County Road 29 and North Augusta Road. There are several daily Via Rail connections at Brockville station to Montreal, Toronto and Ottawa along the Corridor.

The town has a municipal airport (Brockville Regional Tackaberry Airport) in the neighbouring Elizabethtown-Kitley Township. The Ottawa Macdonald–Cartier International Airport is approximately 100 km (62 mi) away.

The Thousand Islands Bridge and the Ogdensburg–Prescott International Bridge, both of which cross the Saint Lawrence River into New York, are 35 km (22 mi) south-west and 25 km (16 mi) north-east from Brockville, respectively.

Brockville Transit is the city-operated public transit system that covers the urban area and provides three regular scheduled bus routes and paratransit services from Monday to Saturday.

== Education ==
Brockville has a community college, four high schools, and several elementary schools.

=== Community colleges ===
St. Lawrence College (Brockville Campus) has an enrolment of around 800. St. Lawrence College was recently ranked number one in Ontario regarding graduate employment rate.

=== High schools ===
Académie catholique Ange-Gabriel is a French Catholic school (Grades JK-12) and has an enrolment of approximately 282 students.

Brockville Collegiate Institute has an enrolment of approximately 560 and boasts strong academic, theatre, and sports programs.

St. Mary Catholic High School is an English Catholic school with around 600 students. It boasts many different athletic programs and a prominent theatre program.

The Fulford Academy is a private boarding school for grades 7–10 international students.

Thousand Islands Secondary School has an enrollment of approximately 1000 students and is both a university and college preparatory school with solid technology facilities. It is also known for its athletics programs, including track and field, women's basketball, men's soccer, and cross-country running.

=== Elementary schools ===
Public elementary schools in the city include Swift Waters Elementary School, Westminster Public School, and Vanier Public School.

The Catholic English elementary schools are St. Francis Xavier, St. John Bosco and James L. Jordan.

Académie Catholique Ange-Gabriel is a French-language Catholic school serving JK - Grade 12.

Heritage Community Christian School, 20 minutes from downtown Brockville, is a privately funded Christian school offering pre-school through grade 12 in a Christian environment.

== Media ==
=== Print ===
The city's leading daily newspaper is The Recorder & Times.

A free monthly magazine called Snapd 1000 Islands is also available around the city.

=== Radio stations licensed to operate in Brockville ===
Frequency	Call sign	Branding	Format	Owner	Notes
FM 91.9	CBOB-FM	CBC Radio One	Talk radio, public radio	Canadian Broadcasting Corporation	Rebroadcaster of CBO-FM (Ottawa)
FM 94.5	CIIB-FM	Information Radio	Tourist information	Instant Information Radio	
FM 99.9	CKJJ-FM-2	UCB Radio	Christian radio	United Christian Broadcasters Canada	Rebroadcaster of CKJJ-FM (Belleville)
FM 102.1	CBOF-FM-7	Ici Radio-Canada Première	Talk radio, public radio	Canadian Broadcasting Corporation	Rebroadcaster of CBOF-FM (Ottawa)
FM 103.7	CJPT-FM	Giant FM 103.7	Classic Rock	My Broadcasting Corporation	
FM 104.9	CFJR-FM	104.9 myFM	Adult contemporary	My Broadcasting Corporation	

Radio stations can also be heard in Brockville from surrounding communities including upstate New York.

=== Television ===
- YourTV Brockville (Cogeco)
- CKWS-TV Kingston

== Notable people ==
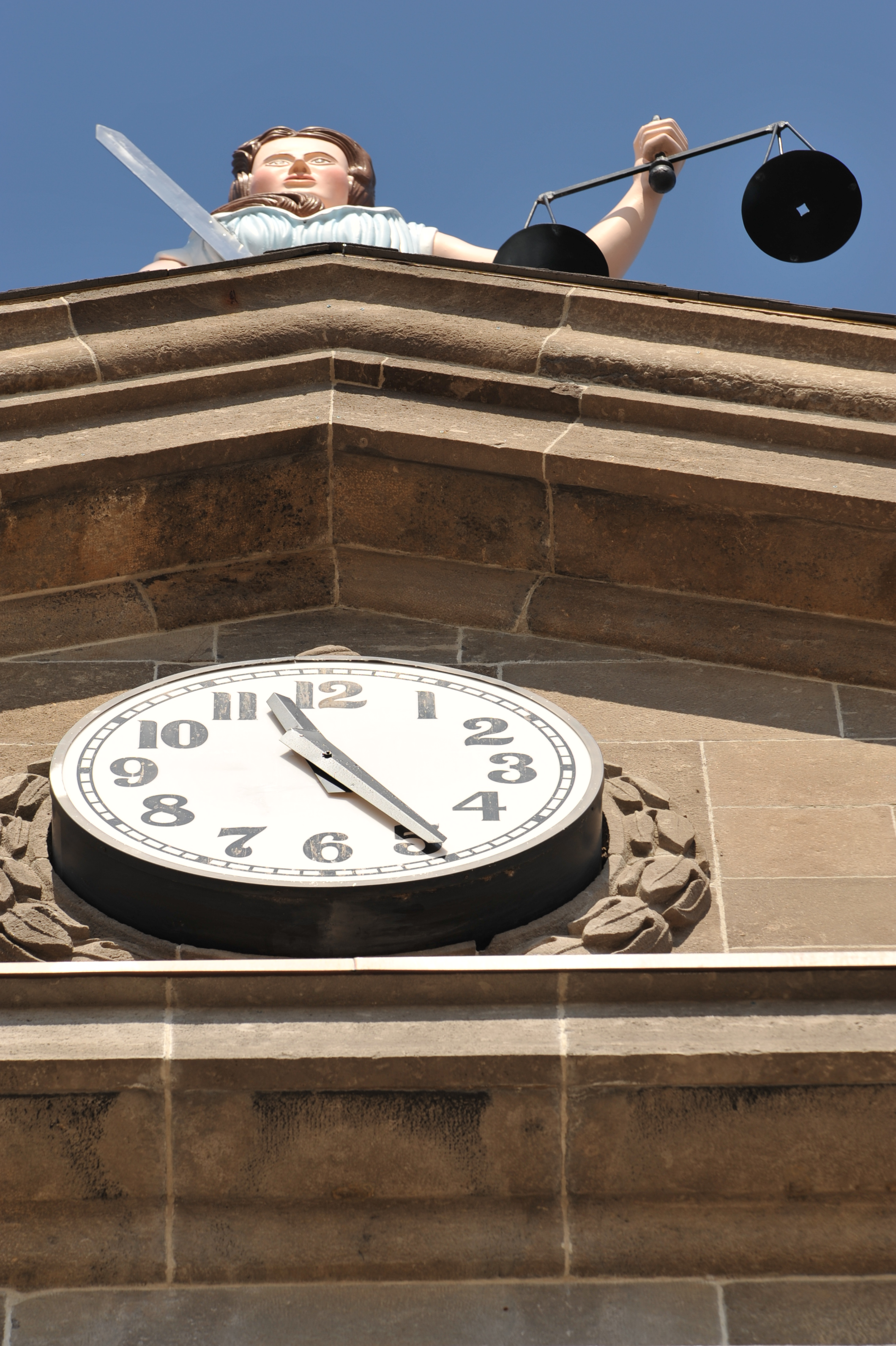
The wooden carved statue of Sally Grant atop the Brockville Court House

- Brad Abraham - screenwriter and Brockville Collegiate Institute graduate
- George Chaffey - civil engineer and urban planner; founder of Ontario, California
- William Chaffey - civil engineer and urban planner
- Brian Chapman - professional ice hockey player
- William Everett Chipman - Wisconsin state senator
- Burke Dales - professional Canadian football player
- Stacey Dales - professional basketball player and broadcaster
- Joan Erikson - author, educator, craftsperson, and dance ethnographer
- Todd Gill - professional ice hockey player
- Ben Hutton - professional ice hockey player
- Walter William LaChance - architect and author
- Randy Ladouceur - professional ice hockey player
- Hank Lammens - professional ice hockey player
- Cyril Leeder - Ottawa Senators team president
- Robert Henry Lindsay - painter
- John Matheson - Member of Parliament and judge
- Alyn McCauley - professional ice hockey player
- Don McGowan - television personality
- James Motluk - documentary filmmaker
- Portia Perez - professional wrestler
- Rachel Perry - television personality
- Nathan Phillips (1892–1976) - Mayor of Toronto
- Shon Seung-wan - South Korean singer
- Randy Sexton - Ottawa Senators general manager
- Frances Ford Seymour - wife of Henry Fonda
- Kelly Thornton - theatre director

== Sister city ==
- Ontario, California, United States
