= Joseph Jamieson =

Canadian politician

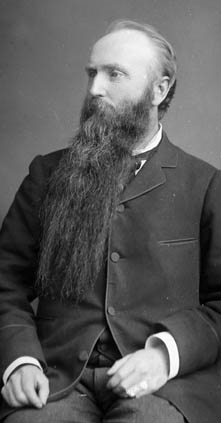

Member of the Canadian Parliament for Lanark North
- In office 1882–1891
- Preceded by: Donald Greenfield MacDonell
- Succeeded by: Bennett Rosamond

Personal details
- Born: March 15, 1839 Sherbrooke, Lanark County, Upper Canada
- Died: March 12, 1922 (aged 82)
- Party: Conservative

Joseph Jamieson (March 15, 1839 – March 12, 1923) was a lawyer and political figure in Ontario, Canada. He represented Lanark North in the House of Commons of Canada from 1882 to 1891 as a Conservative member.

He was born in Sherbrooke, Lanark County, Upper Canada, the son of William Jamieson, an immigrant from Ireland, and was educated in Perth. In 1865, he married Elizabeth Carss. Jamieson was called to the Ontario bar in 1869. He served as reeve for Almonte, warden for Lanark County and chairman of the board of license commissioners for North Lanark. Jamieson ran unsuccessfully for a seat in the House of Commons in the 1878 federal election and an 1880 by-election. He resigned his seat in December 1891 after being named junior county judge for Wellington County.
