= William Mostyn =

Canadian politician

Ontario MPP
- In office 1875–1879
- Preceded by: William Clyde Caldwell
- Succeeded by: William Clyde Caldwell
- Constituency: Lanark North

Personal details
- Born: June 5, 1836 Elphin, County Roscommon
- Died: March 30, 1881 (aged 44)
- Party: Conservative
- Occupation: Physician

William Mostyn (June 5, 1836– March 30, 1881) was an Irish-born medical doctor and political figure in Ontario. He represented Lanark North in the Legislative Assembly of Ontario from 1875 to 1879 as a Conservative member. He drowned at the age of 44.

Of Welsh descent, he was born in Elphin, County Roscommon and came to Upper Canada with his parents in 1837. Mostyn was educated in Kingston and received his M.D. from Queen's University in 1858. He served as a surgeon for the militia. Mostyn was president of the North Lanark Agricultural Society. He served three years as reeve of Almonte and 15 years as assistant coroner for Lanark Ontario. Mostyn was also a district Grand Master in the Freemasons.

== Electoral history ==
1875 Ontario general election: Lanark North
Party	Candidate	Votes	%	±%
Conservative	William Mostyn	913	50.72	+2.52
Liberal	William Clyde Caldwell	887	49.28	−2.52
Turnout		1,800	80.07	
Eligible voters		2,248		
Conservative gain from Liberal		Swing		+2.52
Source: Elections Ontario

1879 Ontario general election: Lanark North
Party	Candidate	Votes	%	±%
Liberal	William Clyde Caldwell	1,309	56.04	+6.76
Conservative	William Mostyn	1,027	43.96	−6.76
Total valid votes		2,336	73.44	−6.64
Eligible voters		3,181		
Liberal gain from Conservative		Swing		+6.76
Source: Elections Ontario
