= Donald Greenfield MacDonell =

Canadian politician

Member of the Canadian Parliament for Lanark North
- In office 1880–1882
- Preceded by: Daniel Galbraith
- Succeeded by: Joseph Jamieson

Personal details
- Born: July 2, 1849 Morrisburg, Canada West
- Died: November 12, 1916 (aged 67)
- Party: Liberal

Donald Greenfield MacDonell (July 2, 1849 – November 12, 1916) was a lawyer and political figure in Ontario, Canada. He represented Lanark North in the House of Commons of Canada from 1880 to 1882 as a Liberal member.

He was born in Morrisburg, Canada West, the son of A.G. MacDonell and the grandson of Donald Macdonell of Greenfield. He was educated at Upper Canada College in Toronto. MacDonell was married twice: to Margaret Rosamond in 1875 and to Edith Rose in 1880. He served as reeve of Almonte in 1878. MacDonell was first elected to the House of Commons in an 1880 by-election held after the death of Daniel Galbraith. He was unsuccessful in bids for reelection in 1882 and 1887.
