= Bennett Rosamond =

Canadian politician (1833–1910)

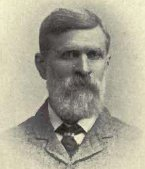

Member of the Canadian Parliament for Lanark North
- In office 1891–1904
- Preceded by: Joseph Jamieson
- Succeeded by: Thomas Boyd Caldwell

Personal details
- Born: May 10, 1833 Carleton Place, Upper Canada
- Died: May 18, 1910 (aged 77) Almonte, Ontario, Canada
- Party: Conservative
- Relations: James Rosamond (father) Margaret Wilson (mother)

Bennett Rosamond (May 10, 1833 – May 18, 1910) was a Canadian manufacturer and politician.

Born in Carleton Place, Upper Canada, the eldest son of James Rosamond and Margaret Wilson, Rosamond was educated at the grammar school in Carleton Place. He was president and managing director of the Rosamond Woollen Company and vice-president and managing director of the Almonte Knitting Company, both of which were inherited from his father James Rosamond. He was Reeve and Mayor of Almonte. He was first elected to the House of Commons of Canada in an 1891 by-election for the riding of Lanark North. A Conservative, he was re-elected in 1896 and 1900.
