= Heritage Community Christian School (Brockville, Ontario) =

Location
- 7463 County Road 28; Addison, Ontario, K0E 1A0; Canada; 44.665147°N 75.805576°W

Information
- School type: Christian Day School
- Motto: Growing in Grace and Knowledge
- Religious affiliation: Multidenominational Christian
- Established: 1960
- Principal: Mrs. Sheila May
- Faculty: 10
- Grades: JK, Kindergarten, Grades 1 - 12
- Enrollment: 125
- Campus: New Dublin, Ontario (Rural)
- Colours: Navy and White
- Website: www.hccs.ca

Heritage Community Christian School is an independent Christian school serving Brockville, Athens, Prescott, Smiths Falls and Leeds and Grenville. The school teaches children in JK through Grade 12 through a Christian worldview. Grades 9 - 12 are offered through our secondary program, "Heritage Christian High School" (HCHS), where OCT-certified teacher teaches students in a small class setting, complementing this with online learning, devotions, phys. ed, local and provincial access to athletics as well as outreach programming. The school has approximately 100 students.

== Extracurricular activities ==
The school has a music program, including choir and music theory. The school also has a French program.

The school is also involved in other programs including: robotics competition, service projects, historical fair, local and regional soccer/volleyball/basketball competitions and track and field.

== Location ==
The school is located about a 10 minute drive from Brockville, Ontario in a small settlement named New Dublin, Ontario. The school is near the geographic middle of Leeds and Grenville.

== Associations ==
HCCS is a member of Edvance Christian School Association. HCHS is a member of the Leeds Grenville Secondary School Sports Association and the Ontario Christian Secondary School Athletic Association (Associate Member).
