= William Thoburn (politician) =

Canadian politician

Member of the Canadian Parliament for Lanark North
- In office 1908–1917
- Preceded by: Thomas Boyd Caldwell
- Succeeded by: The electoral district was abolished in 1914.

Personal details
- Born: April 14, 1847 Portsmouth, England
- Died: January 23, 1928 (aged 80)
- Party: Conservative

William Thoburn (April 14, 1847 – January 23, 1928) was a Canadian woollen manufacturer and politician in the province of Ontario.

Born in Portsmouth, England, Thoburn came to British North America in 1857 and was educated at Pakenham School in Pakenham, Ontario. He moved to Almonte, Ontario in 1867 and eventually became a woollen manufacturer. He was elected to the House of Commons of Canada for the electoral district of Lanark North in the 1908 federal election. A Conservative, he was re-elected in the 1911 election. He served for several years as a school trustee and councillor, and was for seven years Mayor of Almonte.
