= Brockville and Ottawa Railway =

Railway line in Canada

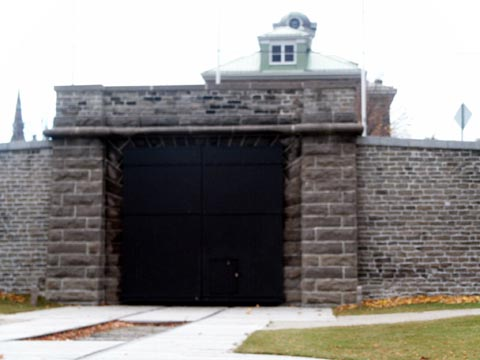
The southern entrance of the Brockville Railway Tunnel, located south of Water Street within sight of the St. Lawrence River.

The Brockville and Ottawa Railway (B&O) was an early railway incorporated in 1853 by the Parliament of the Province of Canada with the financial support of English iron-founders, Bolckow and Vaughan, of Middlesbrough, England, who were supplying the iron for the railway. It ran north from the town of Brockville on the Saint Lawrence River to Smiths Falls, Perth, Carleton Place, and Almonte. It was built primarily to serve the timber trade on the Ottawa Valley, short-cutting routes that led into the city of Ottawa, further downstream. The first railway tunnel in Canada, the Brockville Tunnel, was dug in order to allow the B&O to reach the port lands on the south side of the city, which sits on a bluff. In September 1865 the B&O opened for travel to Sand Point near Arnprior on the Ottawa River.

A second railway company, the Canada Central Railway (CCR), was first chartered in May 1861. The act authorized the company to build from a point on Lake Huron to a point on the Ottawa River, a very generous geographical provision to say the least. Even more generous and unusual was a land grant of 12,000 acres per mile (30 km^{2}/km) of line completed by September 1870. This legislated land grant proved highly contentious as well as potentially valuable. Bolckow and Vaughan acquired the lapsing CCR charter in 1865 in the belief that the land claim attached to that railway had value, and had the Legislature of the Province of Canada extend the time for completion by five years to 1870.

The two companies were later merged under the Canada Central name, and continued to push northward to Mattawa. The line was leased by the Canadian Pacific Railway and merged in 1881, and was later extended to North Bay and Sudbury. CP used the original CC routing as their primary access to Ottawa, joining it to the Ontario and Quebec Railway (O&Q) at Perth. The O&Q was later abandoned and replaced by a new line running through Belleville.

Much of the original B&O and CCR routes remain in active use. CP maintained ownership of the tracks between Smiths Falls and Brockville (known as the CP Brockville Sub) until November 2015, when Via Rail acquired this section for its Ottawa–Toronto service.

== See also ==
- List of Ontario railways
- List of defunct Canadian railways
- Asa Belknap Foster
